= List of historic properties in Wickenburg, Arizona =

- Town
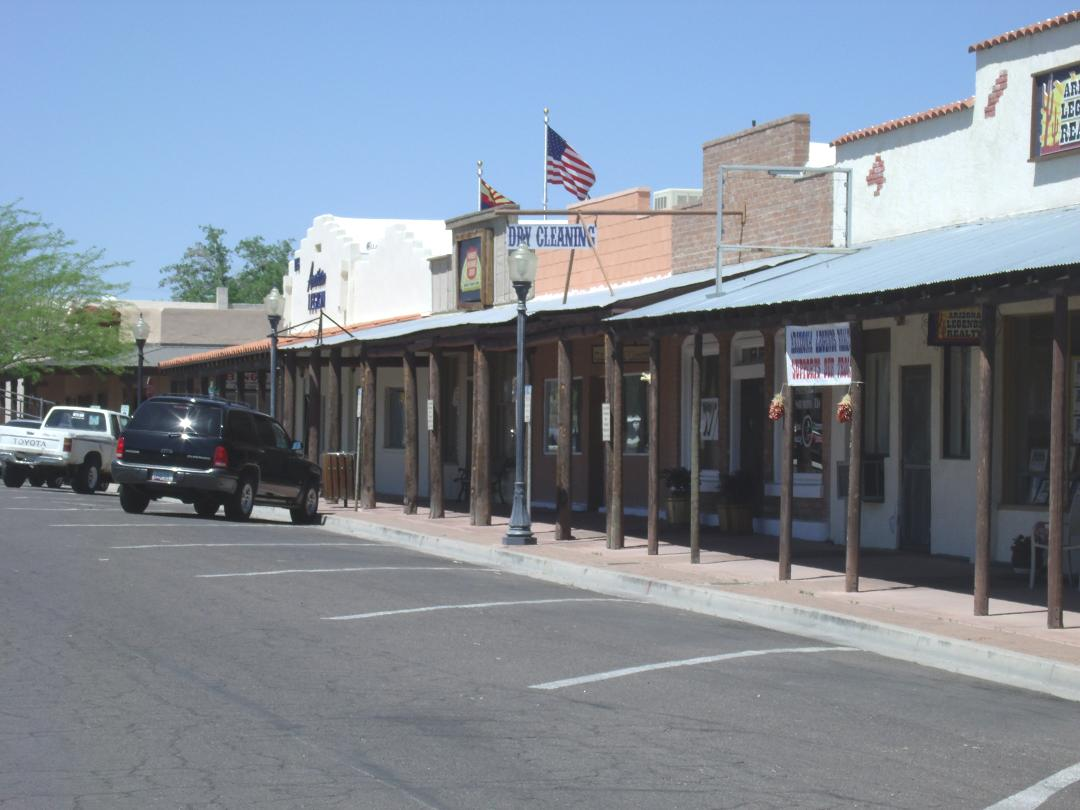
- Frontier Street

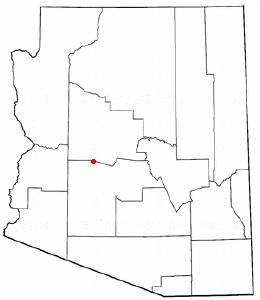
- Location in Maricopa County and the state of Arizona

This is a list of historic properties in Wickenburg, Arizona, which includes a photographic gallery of some of the towns historic structures. Some of these structures are listed in the National Register of Historic Places. Others are listed as historical by the Wickenburg Chamber of Commerce. Also included are the photographs of the Vulture Mine and of various of the remaining properties and ruins of Vulture City, a ghost town situated at the site of the defunct Vulture Mine. These include the Vulture Mine–Assay office, built in 1884, Henry Wickenburg's Settlers Home and Rita's Brothel.

== Brief history ==
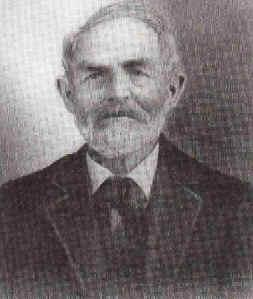
Henry Wickenburg

The Vulture Mine was a gold mine which was discovered in 1863. It was the most productive gold mine in the history of Arizona. From 1863 to 1942, the mine produced 340,000 ounces of gold and 260,000 ounces of silver. The Vulture mine was discovered when Henry Wickenburg, a prospector from California's gold rush, stumbled upon a quartz deposit containing gold while traveling in Arizona. Wickenburg began mining the outcrop himself.

In 1863, after Henry Wickenburg discovered the Vulture mine, Vulture City, a small mining town, was established in the area. Vulture City's post office was established on October 4, 1880, and Henry Wickenburg was the town's first Post Master. The town had more than five boarding houses and several buildings. The huge Vulture Mine-Assay Office building, built in 1884, still stands today. The town also had cookhouse and mess hall plus stores, saloons and even a school. The town once had a population of 5,000 citizens. The town was marked by violence. Eighteen men were hung on an ironwood tree located by the ruins of Henry Wickenburg's house.

In 1863, miners, ranchers and farmers who built their homes along the fertile plain of the Hassayampa River, also founded the town of Wickenburg. Along the town's main historic district, early businesses built many structures that still form Wickenburg's downtown area.

The fact that a property is listed in the National Register of Historic Places does not guarantee that the owner of the same will not have the property demolished. Unfortunately many of the historic sites are in grave danger of collapsing or destruction. According to Jim McPherson, Arizona Preservation Foundation Board President: "It is crucial that residents, private interests, and government officials act now to save these elements of our cultural heritage before it is too late."

The following structures serve as examples of historic properties which no longer exist.

- The Santa Fe Bunk House – Listed in 1986; reference #86003761.
- The Sunset Telephone Co. – Listed in 1986; reference #86003863.
- The PJ Thompson House – Listed in 1986; reference #86001591.
- The Masonic Hall – Listed in 1986; reference #86001583.
- The Wickenburg Ice and Cold Storage – Listed in 1986; reference #86001596.

== Historic Structures ==
The following photographs are of some of the historic structures in Wickenburg listed in the National Register of Historic Places National Register of Historic Places.

Historic Wickenburg, Arizona

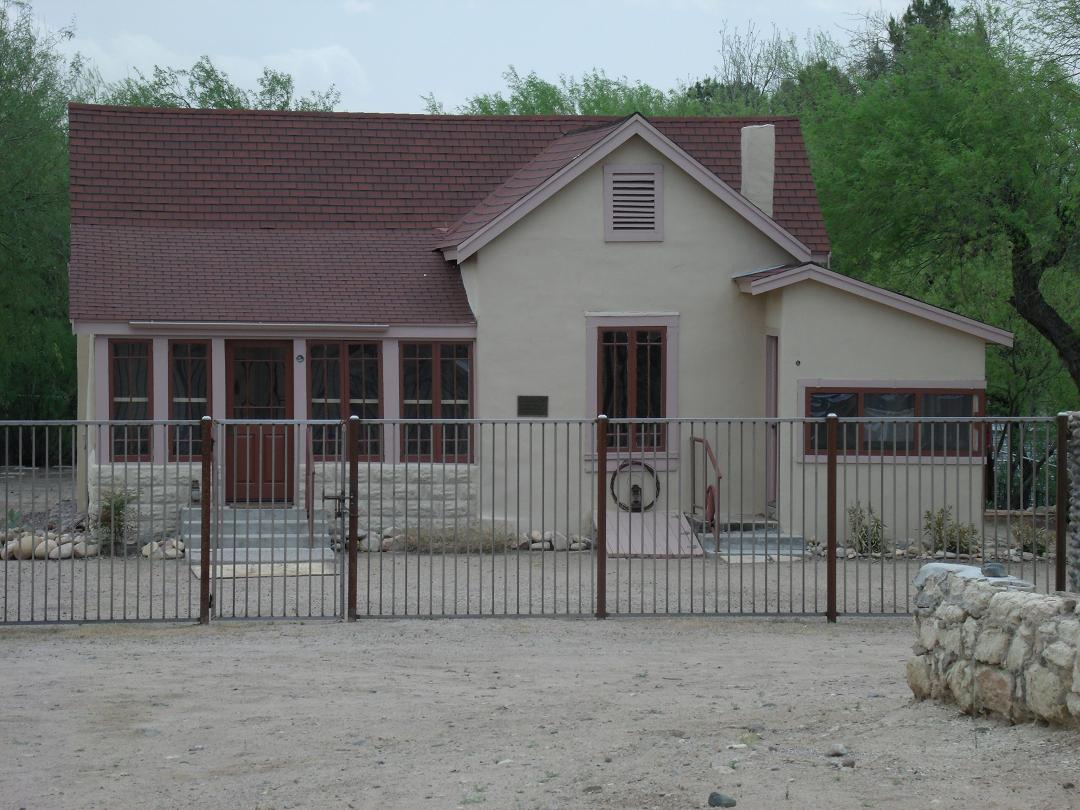
Henry Wickenburg built what is known as the Wickenburg-Boetto House in 1900. The house is located at 225 S. Washington and was listed in the National Register of Historic Places on July 10, 1986. Reference number#86001584.

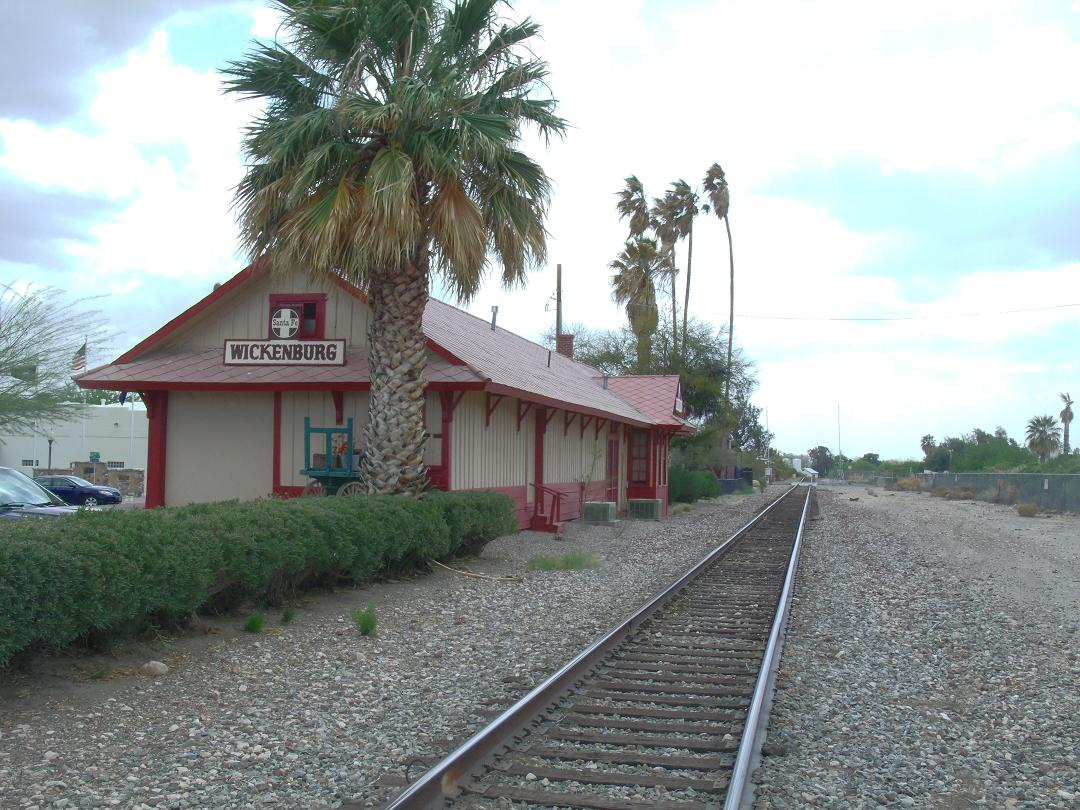
Santa Fe Railroad Depot built 1895 and located at 215 N. Frontier. The property now the offices for the local chamber of commerce and visitor center. It was listed in the National Register of Historic Places in July 10, 1986. Reference number #86001588.

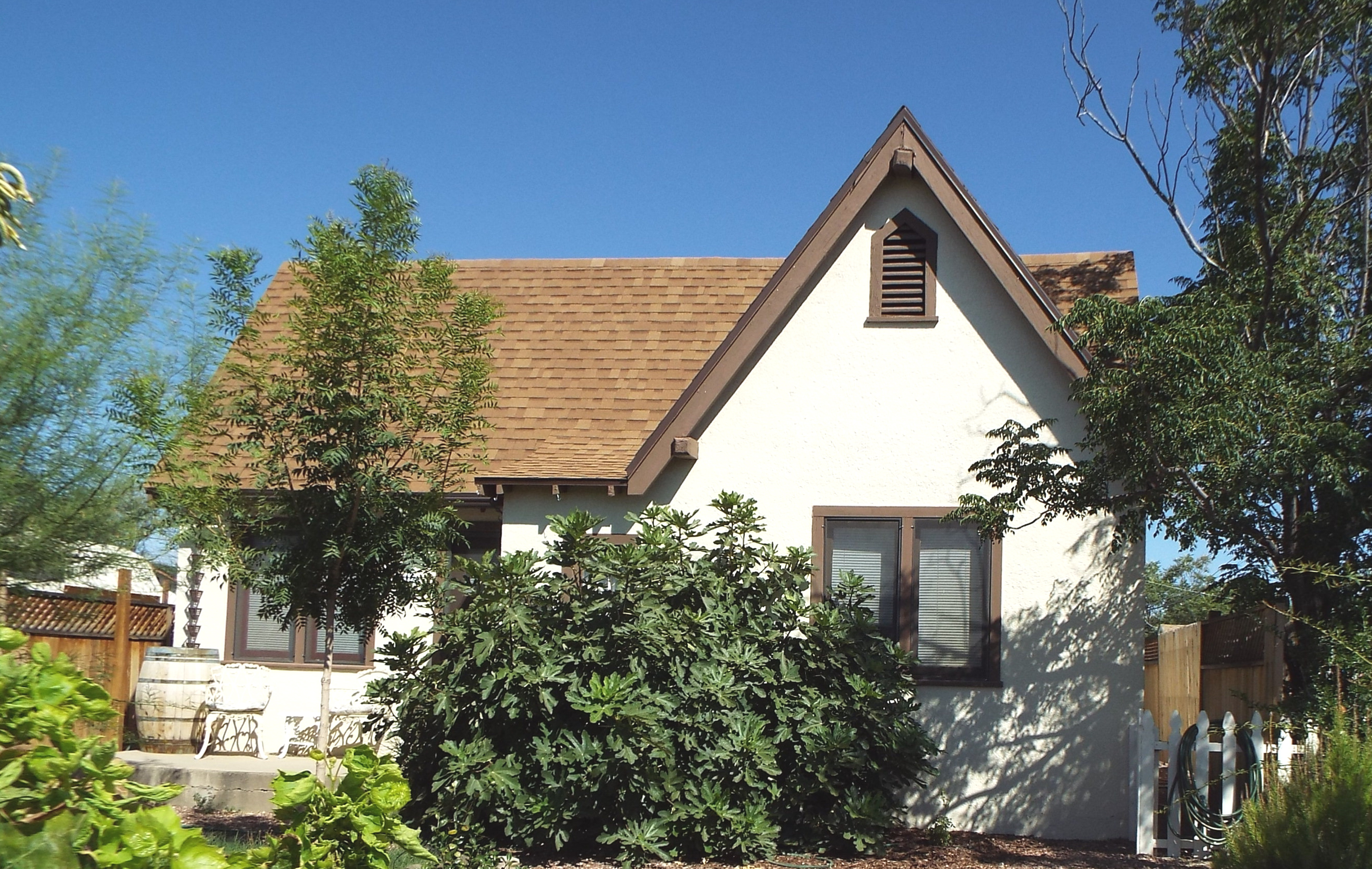
House at 160 Apache Street built in 1923 and listed in the National Register of Historic Places on July 10, 1986, reference #86001578.

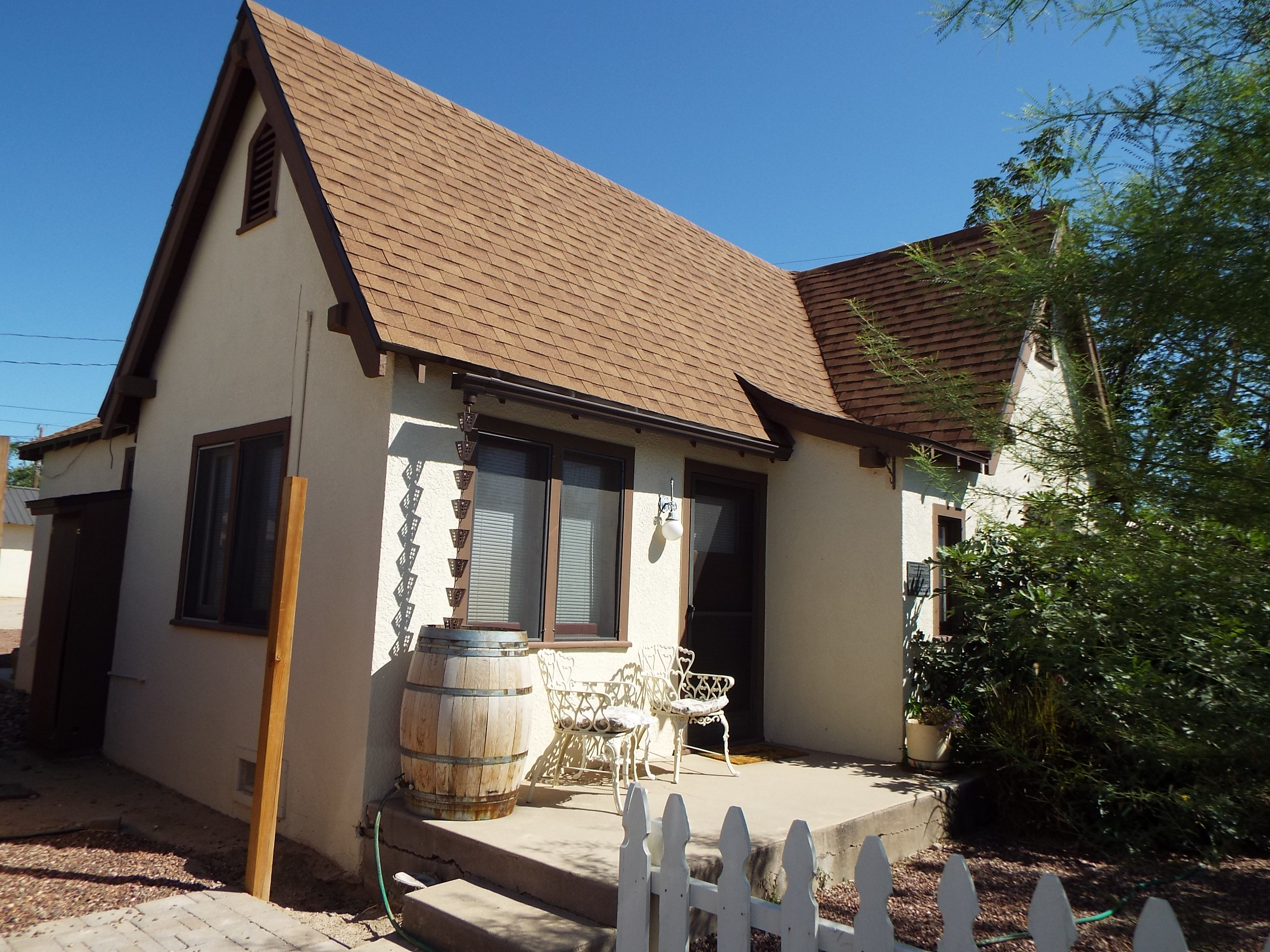
Different view of the House at 160 Apache Street

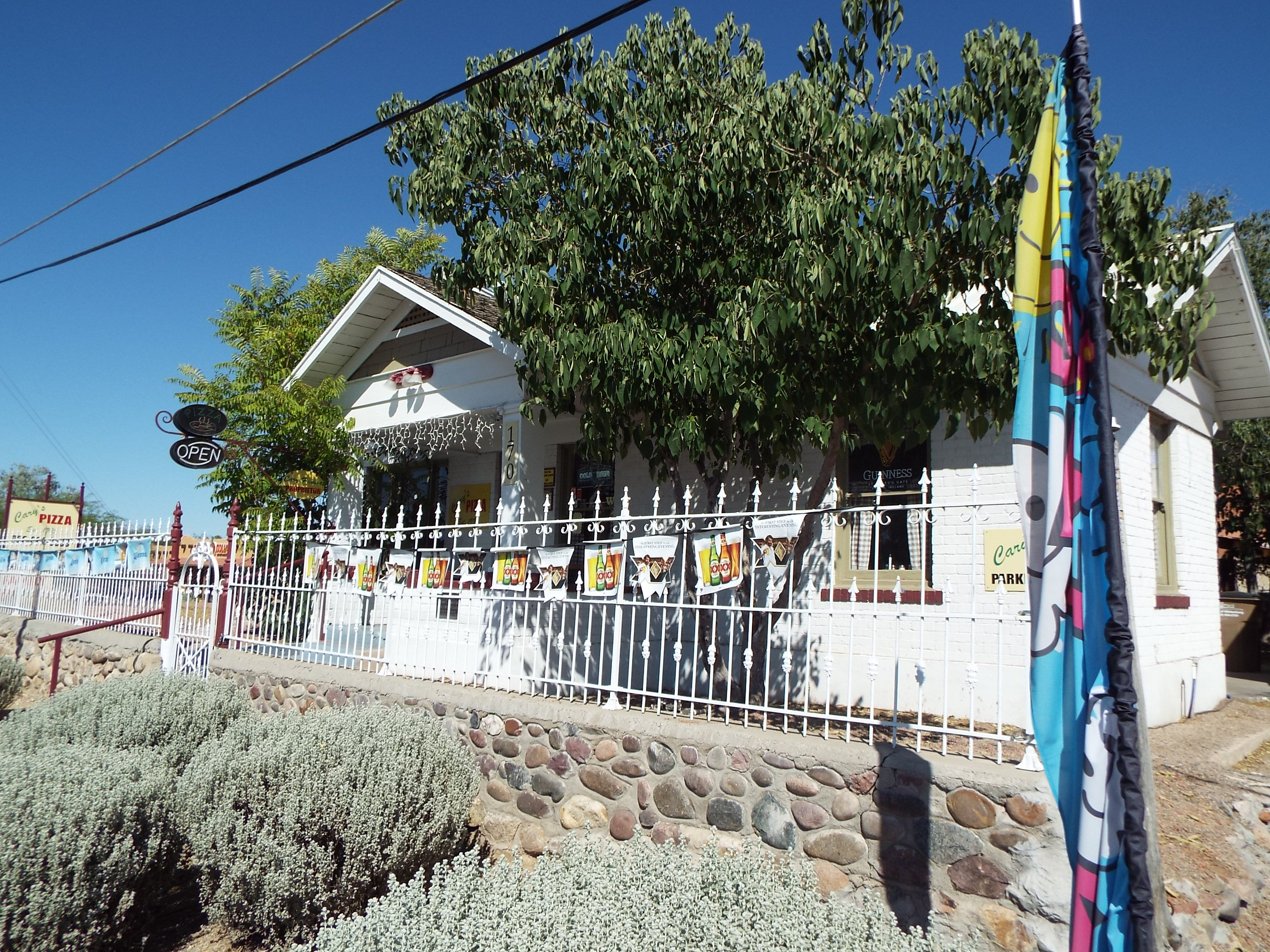
House at 170 Center Street built in 1925 and listed in the National Register of Historic Places on July 10, 1986, reference #86001579.

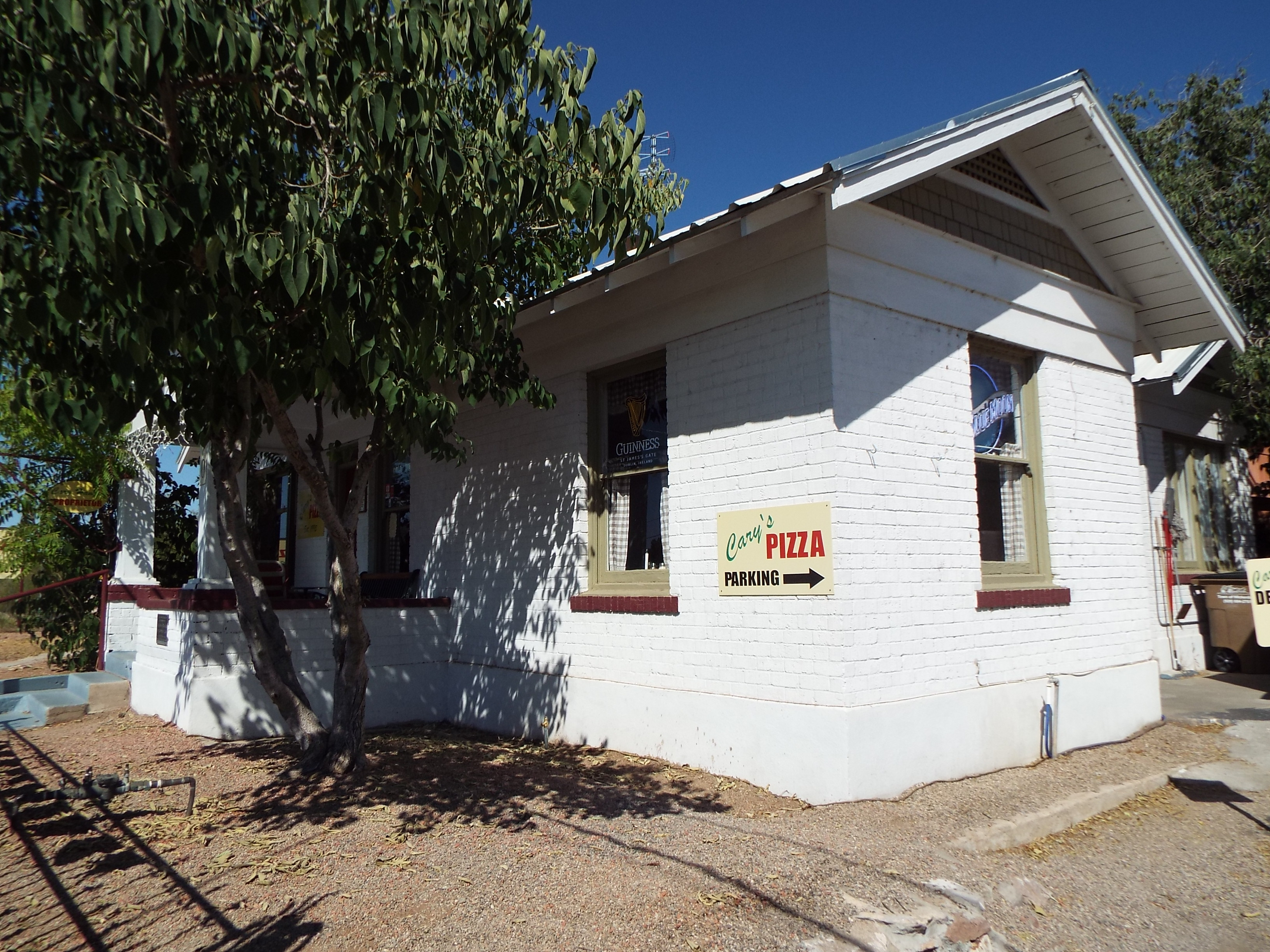
Different view of the House at 170 Center Street

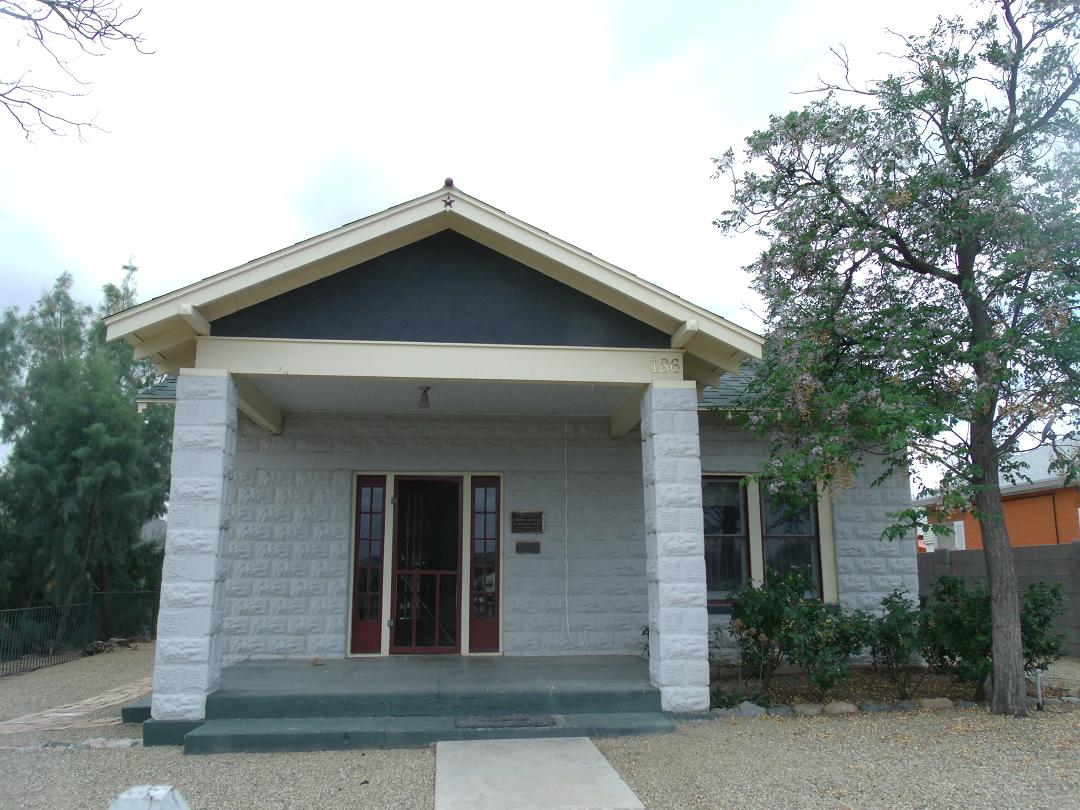
House at 186 Washington built 1900 and located at 186 Washington. The property was listed in the National Register of Historic Places on July 10, 1986. Reference number #86001560.

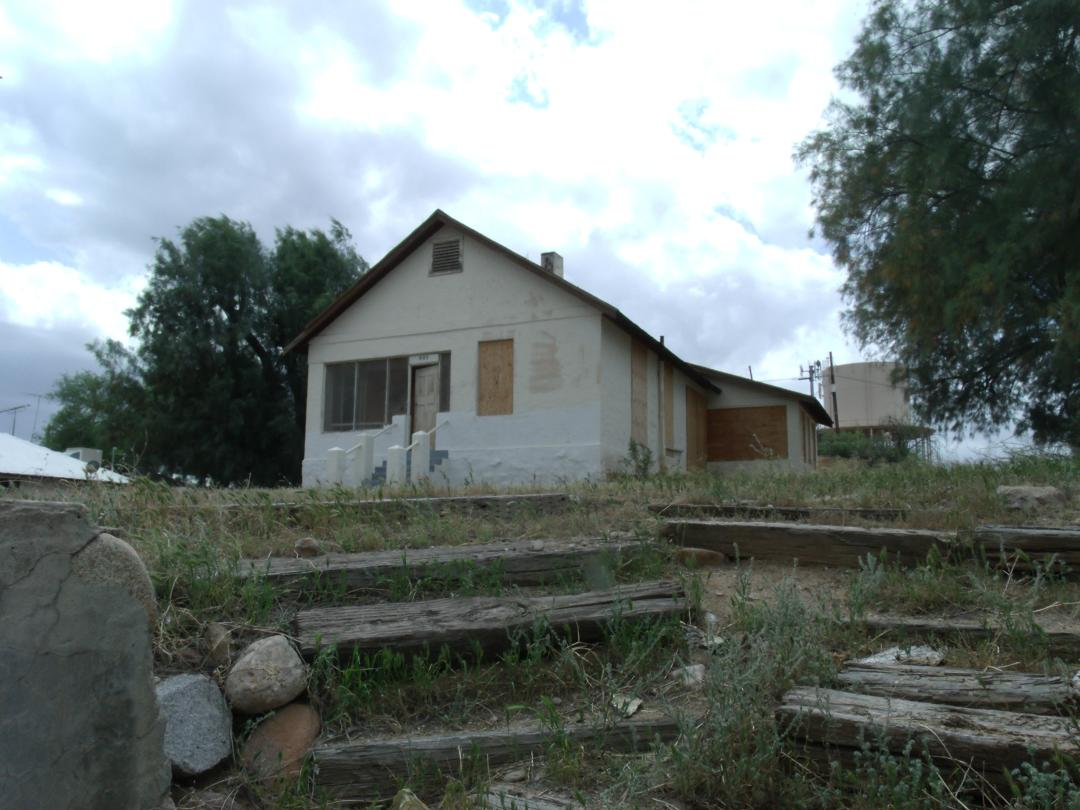
Jacobs House built 1900 and located at 355 N. Jefferson. The property was listed in the National Register of Historic Places on July 10, 1986. Reference number #86001581.

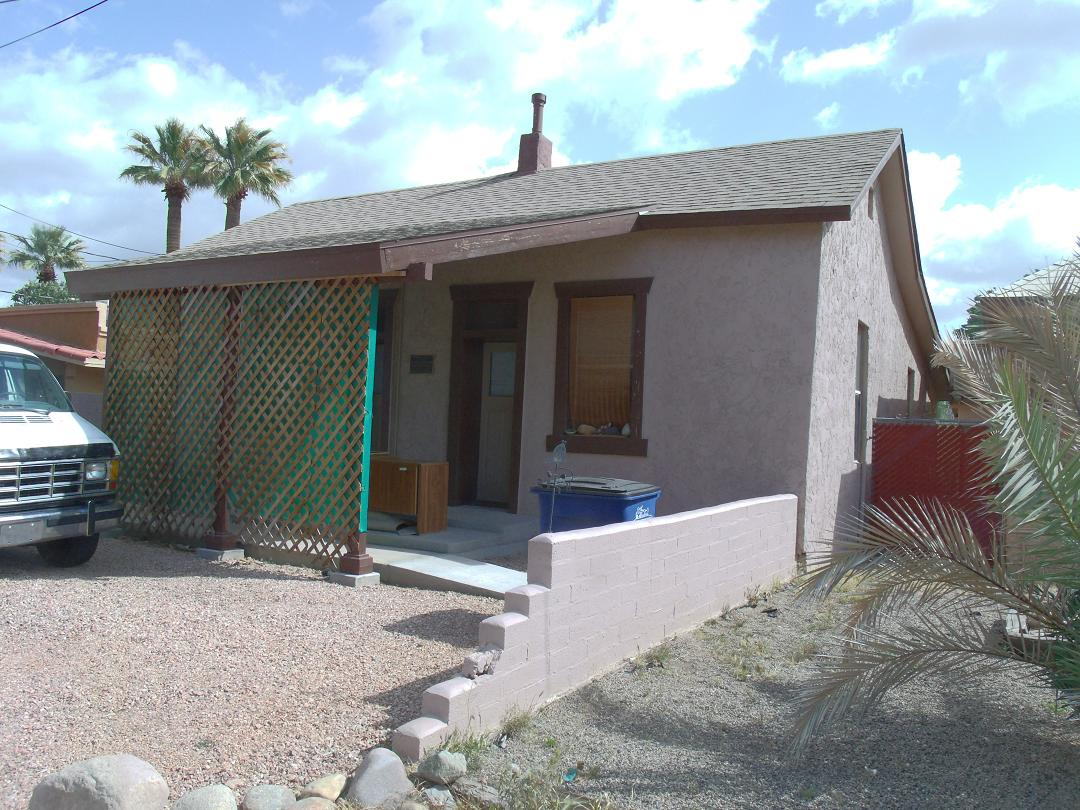
Wisdom House built 1900 and located at 48 Kerkes. The property was listed in the National Register of Historic Places in 1987. Reference number #86001590.

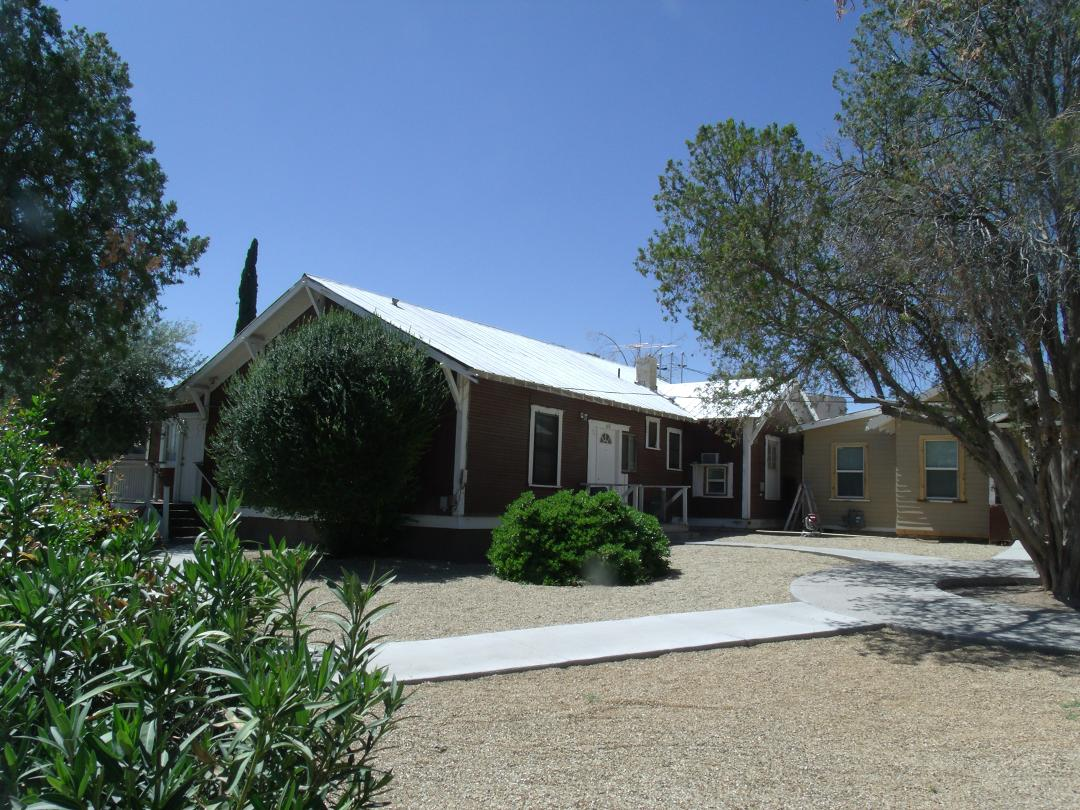
Cactus Inn built in 1900 and located at 158 Yavapai Street. Listed in the National Register of Historic Places July 10, 1986. Reference #86001577.

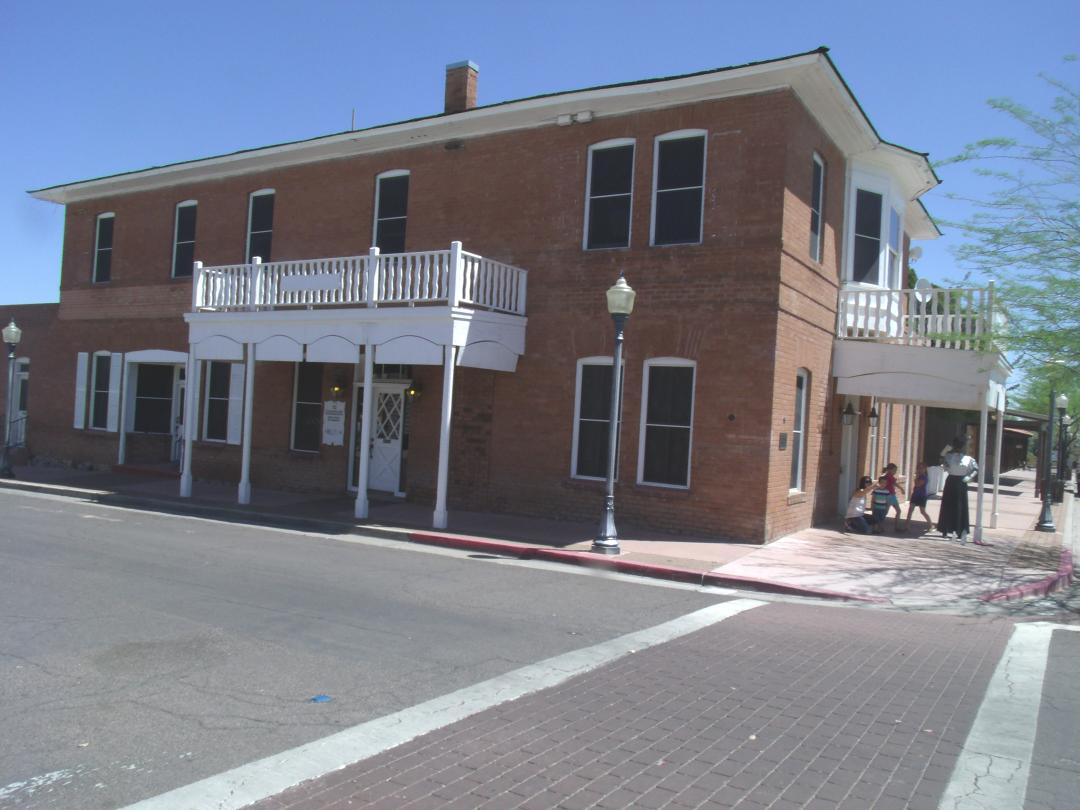
Vernetta Hotel built 1905 and located at 1 Apache St. Originally the known as the Smith Hotel, the hotel's owner was Mrs. Elizabeth Smith, an African-American businesswoman. Now known as the Hassayampa Building, it contains offices for Remuda Ranch. The property was listed in the National Register of Historic Places on July 10, 1986. Reference number #86001593

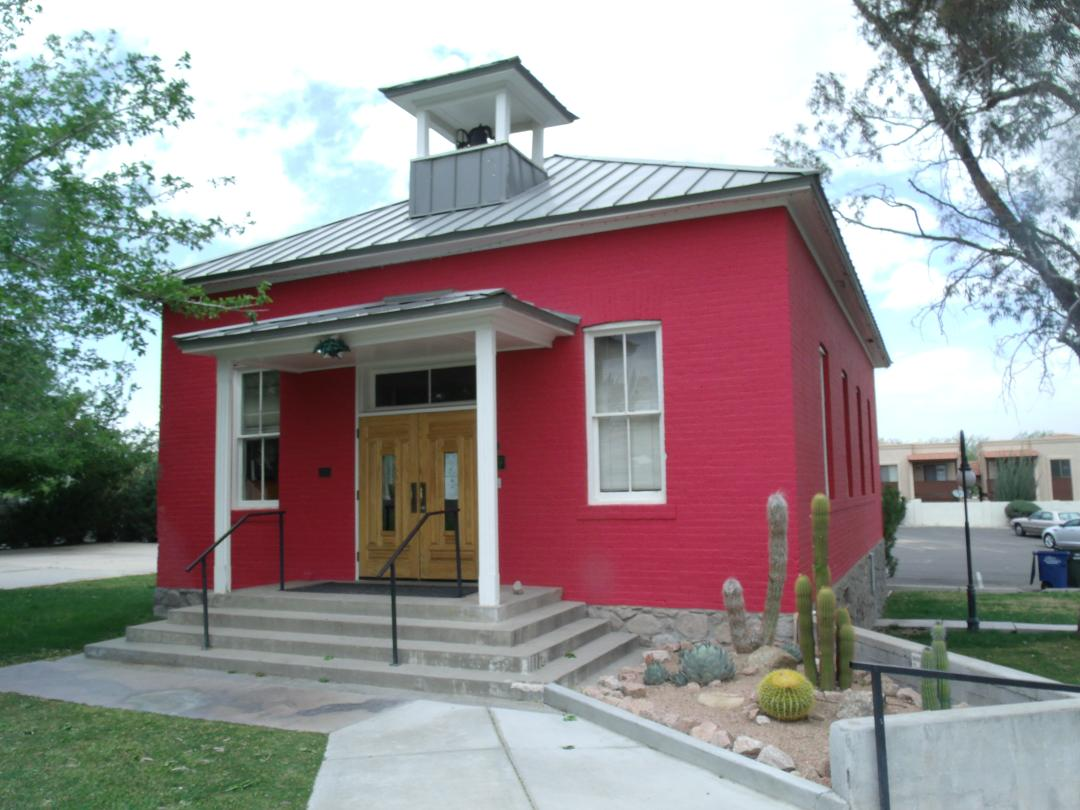
Garcia School built 1905 and located at Yavapai. The property was listed in the National Register of Historic Places in 1982. Reference number #86002087

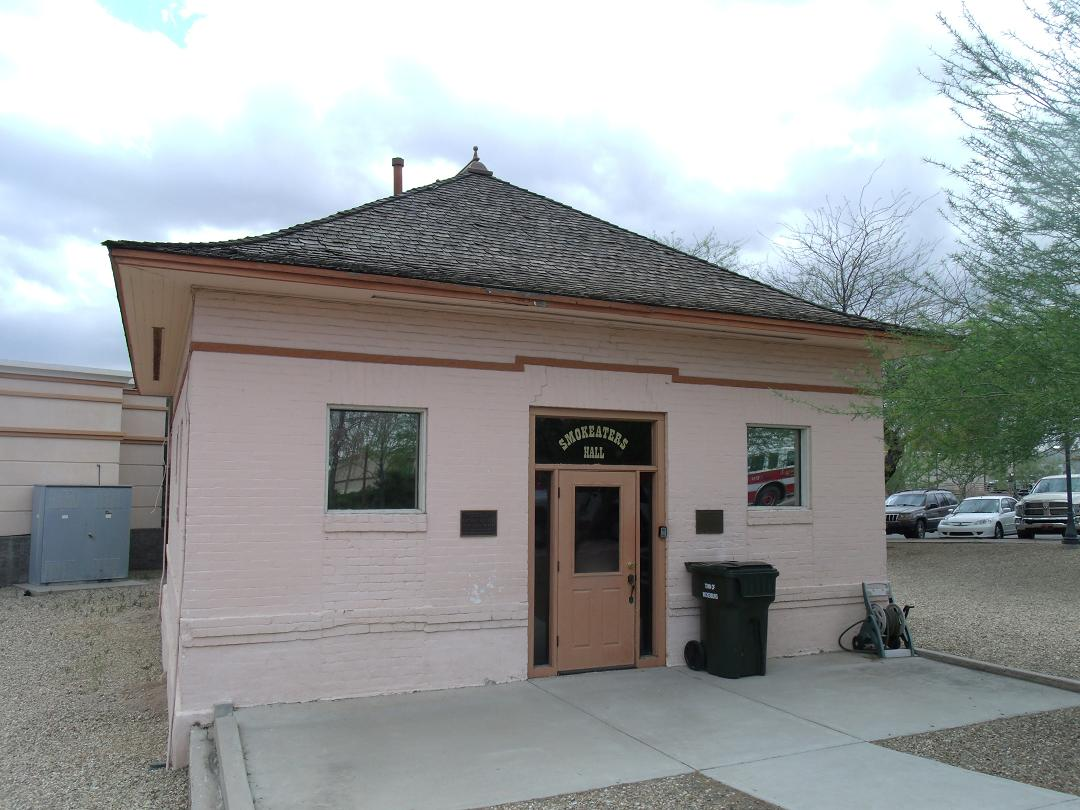
City Hall & Jail built 1909 and located at 117 Yavapai. The property was listed in the National Register of Historic Places on July 10, 1986. Reference number #86001577

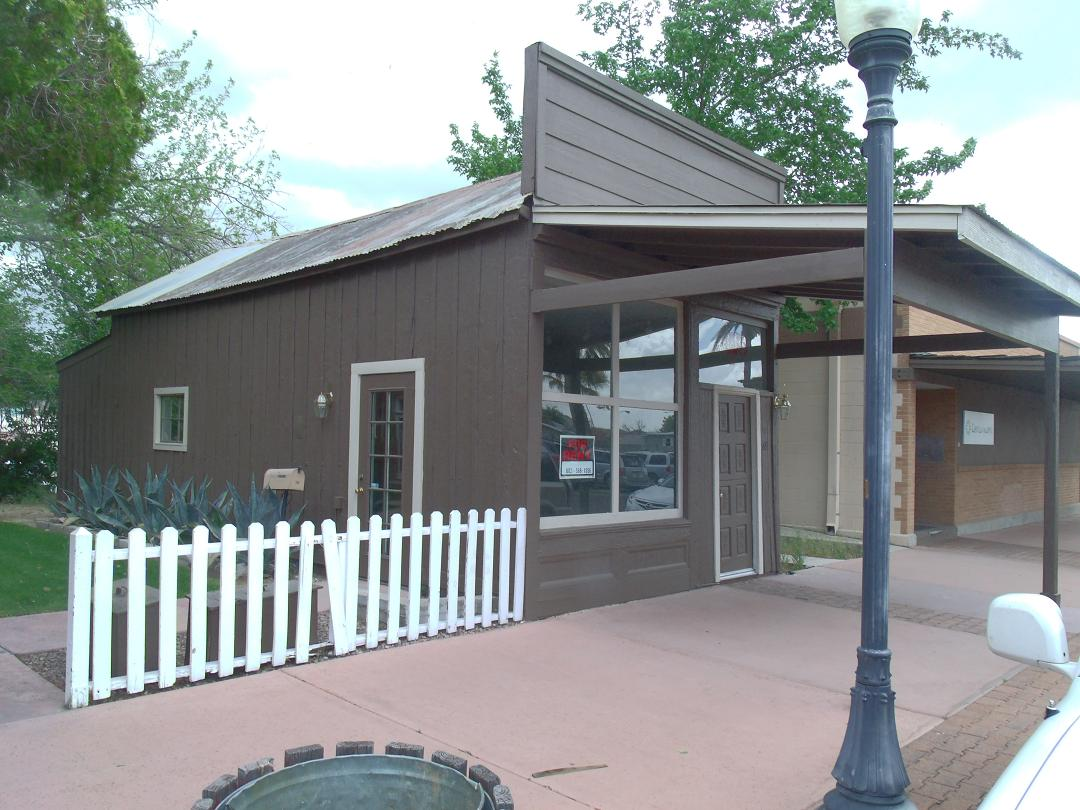
Old Barber Shop, also known as the "Helm Barber Shop", built 1910 and located at 68 Frontier. The property was listed in the National Register of Historic Places on July 10, 1986. Reference number #86001585.

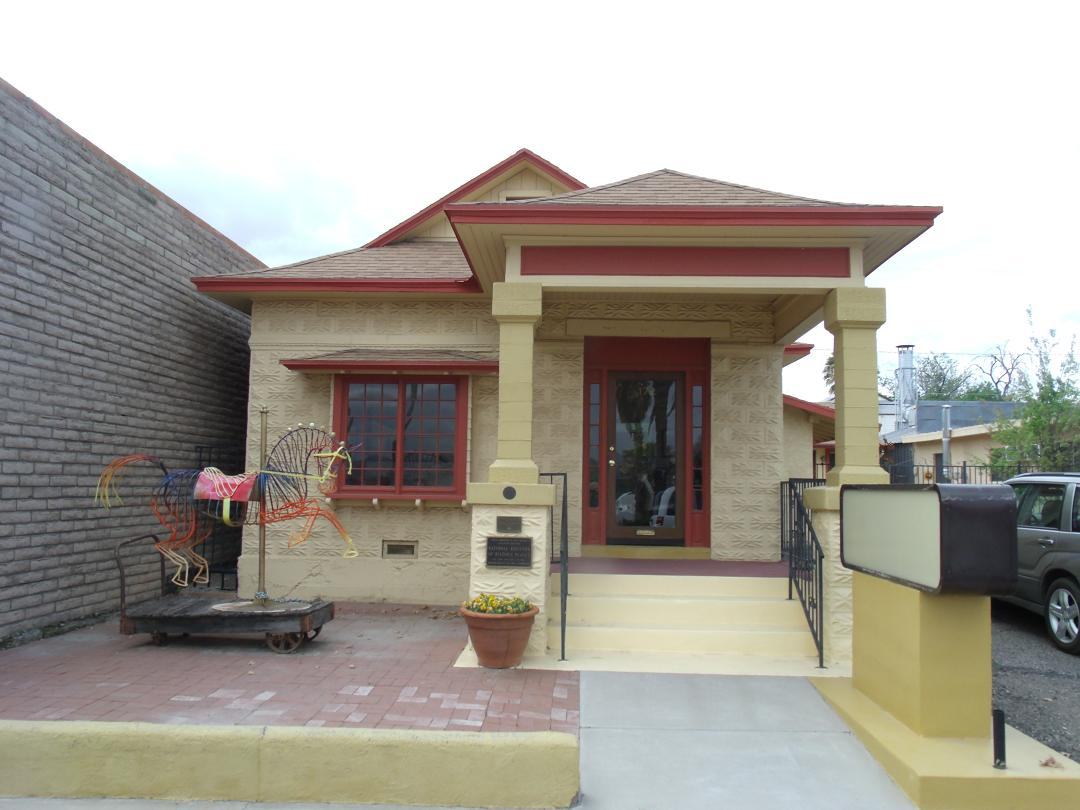
George B. Upton House built 1920 and located at 172 Washington. The property was listed in the National Register of Historic Places on July 10, 1986. Reference number #86001592.

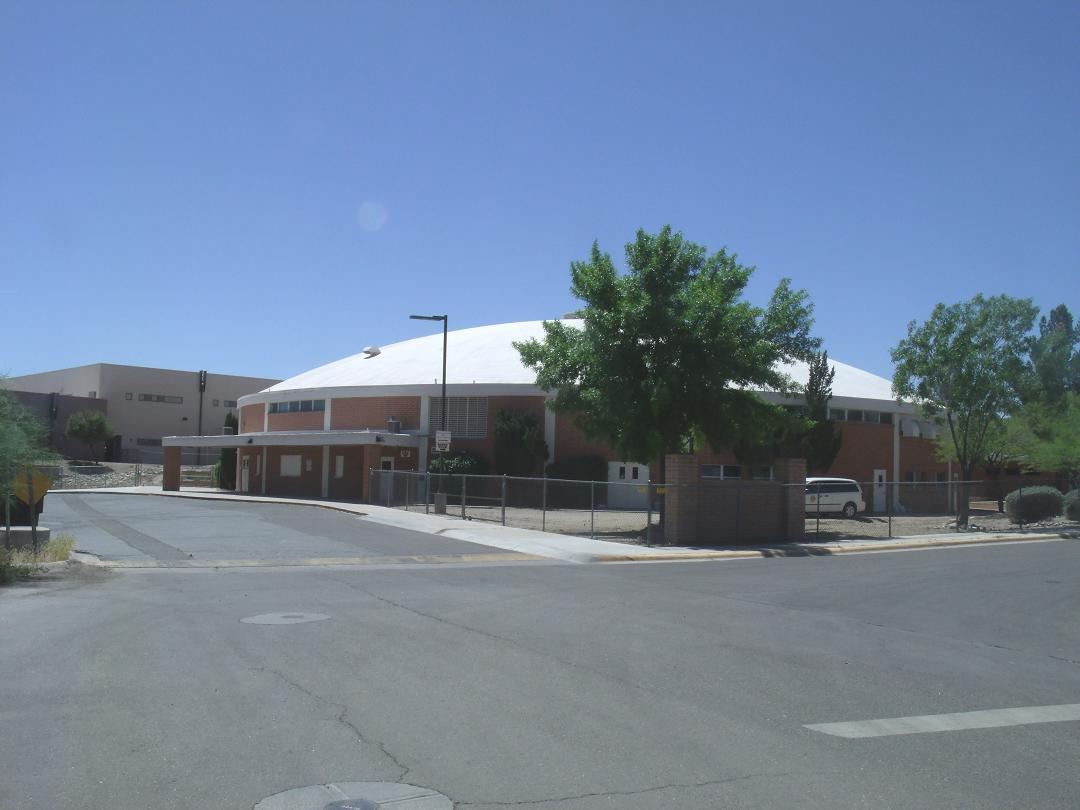
Wickenburg High School and Annex located at 250 Tegner Street. Listed in the National Register of Historic Places July 10, 1986. Reference #86001595.

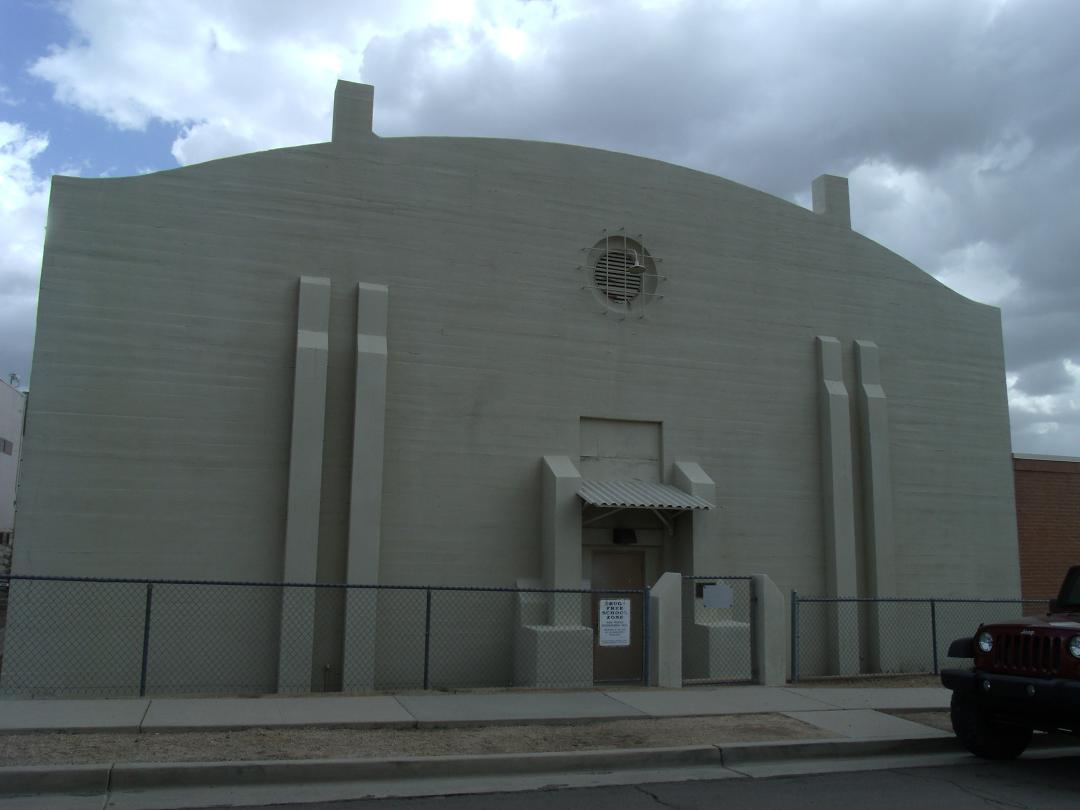
Wickenburg High School Gym built 1920 and located at 252 Tegner. The property was listed in the National Register of Historic Places on July 10, 1986. Reference number #86001594.

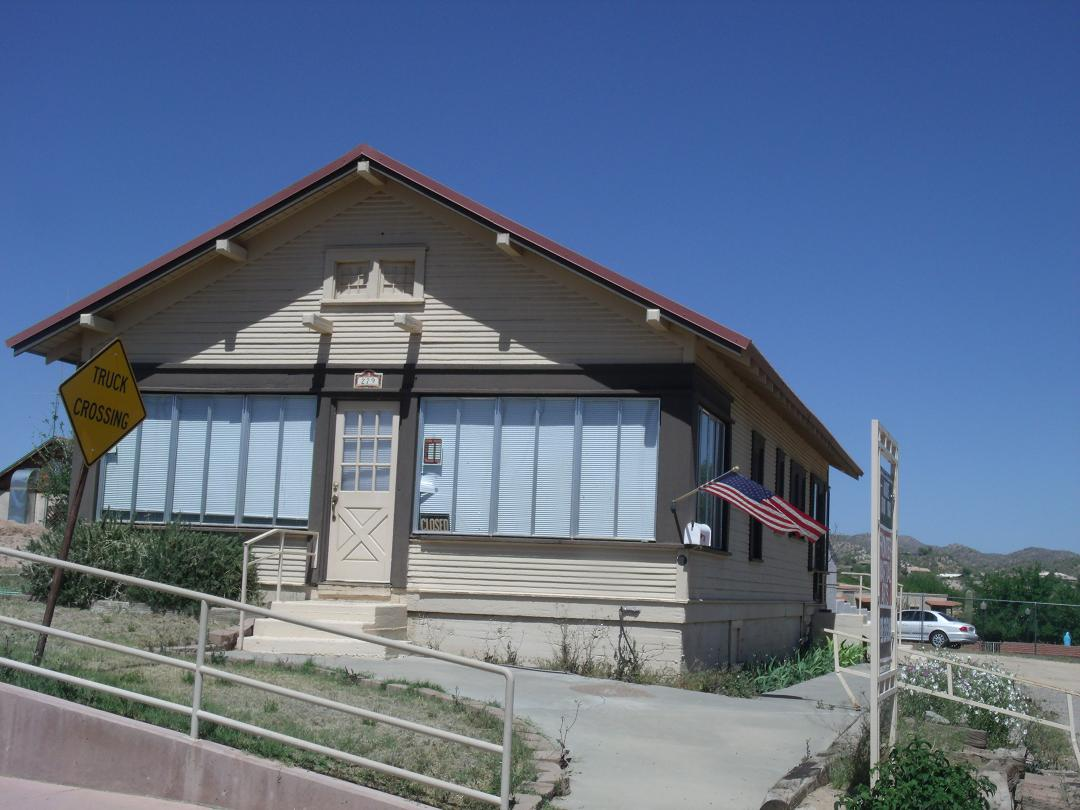
Santa Fe Section House built in 1925 and located at 279 Railroad Street. The foreman and the workers who maintained the tracks in these sections were provided this lodging. Listed in the National Register of Historic Places July 10, 1986. Reference #86003762.

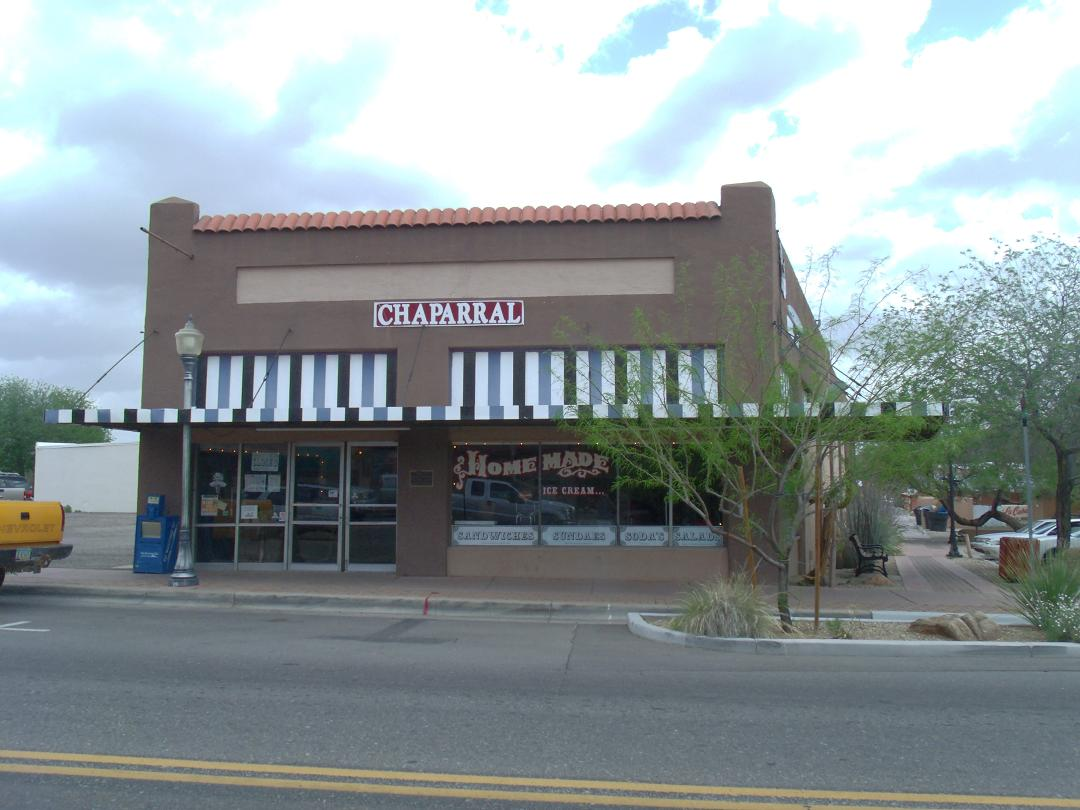
Safeway Pay and Takit built 1925 and located at 42 N Tegner. The property was listed in the National Register of Historic Places on July 10, 1986. Reference number #86001587.

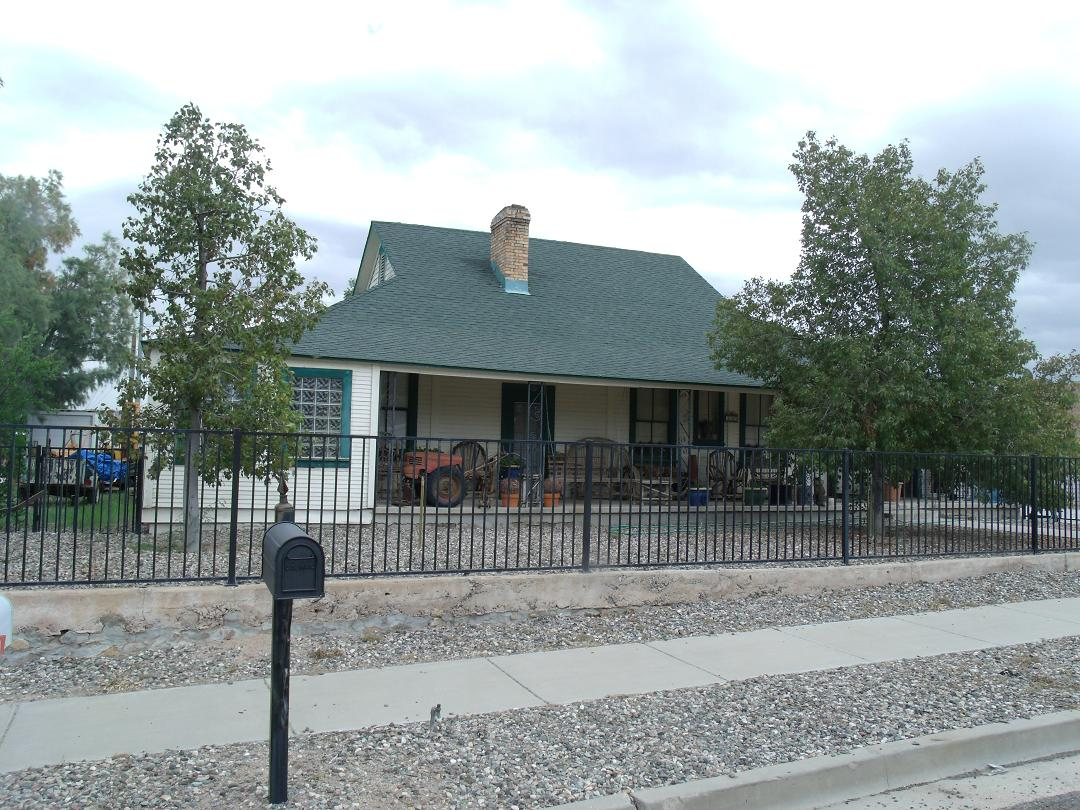
MacLennan House built 1925 and located at 339 N. Jefferson. The property was listed in the National Register of Historic Places on July 10, 1986. Reference number #86001582.

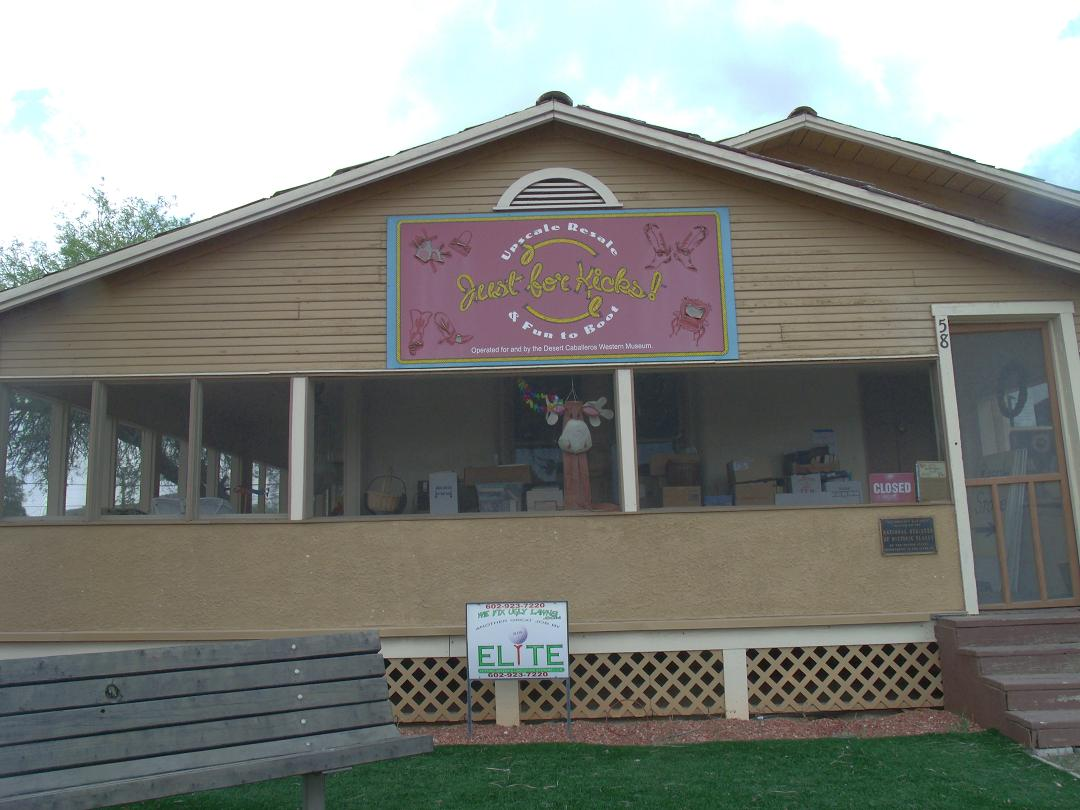
Shride House built 1925 and located at 58 Tegner. The property was listed in the National Register of Historic Places on July 10, 1986. Reference number #86001589.

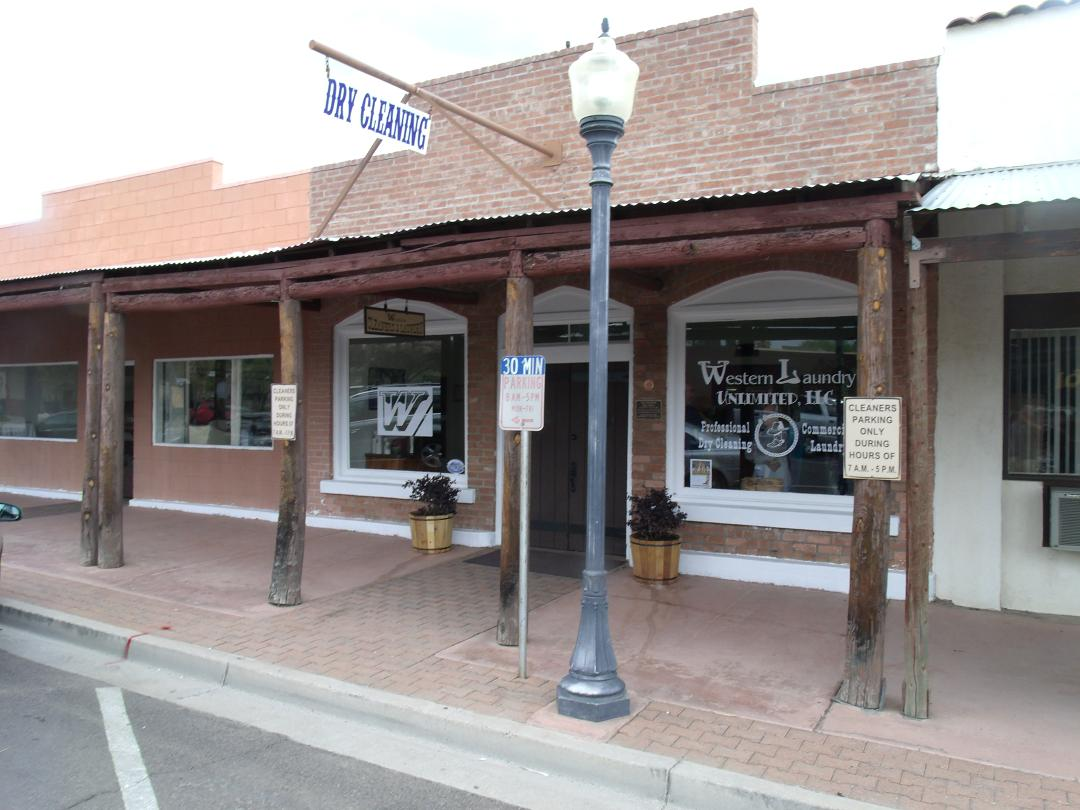
Old Brick Post Office built 1930 and located at 144 N Frontier. The property was listed in the National Register of Historic Places on July 10, 1986. Reference number #86001586.

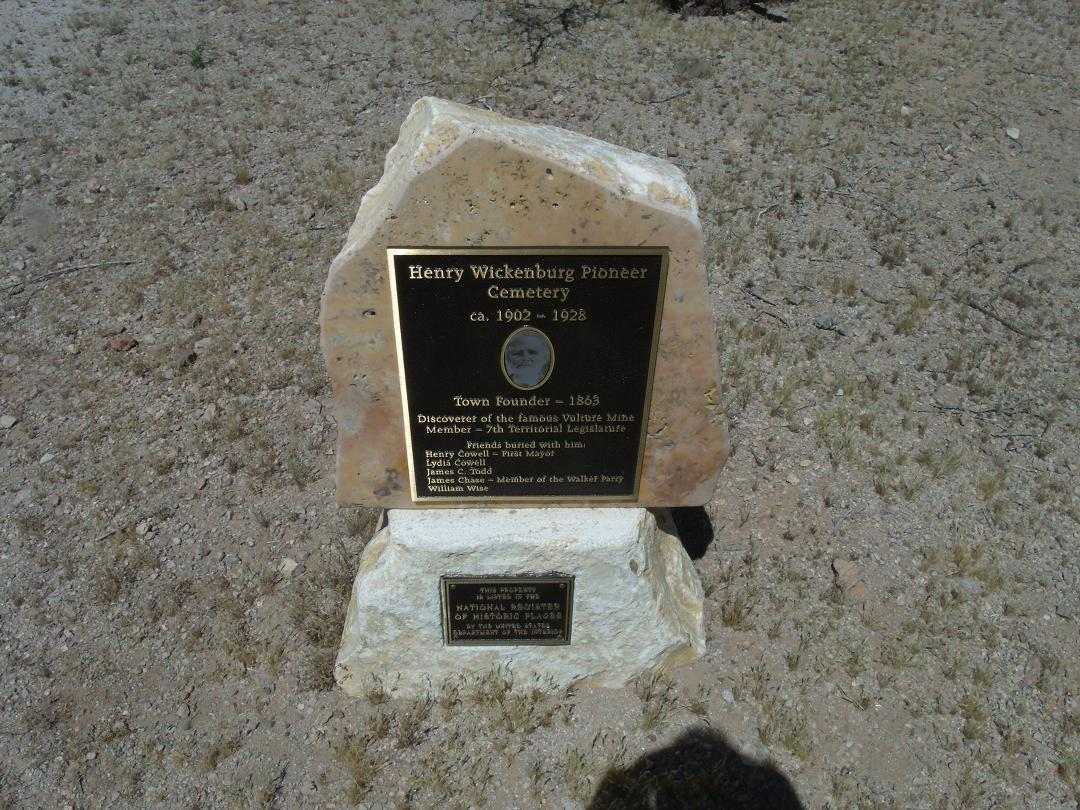
NRHP plaque in the entrance of the Henry Wickenburg Pioneer Cemetery. The cemetery was listed in the National Register of Historic Places April 4, 2011. Reference #11000151.

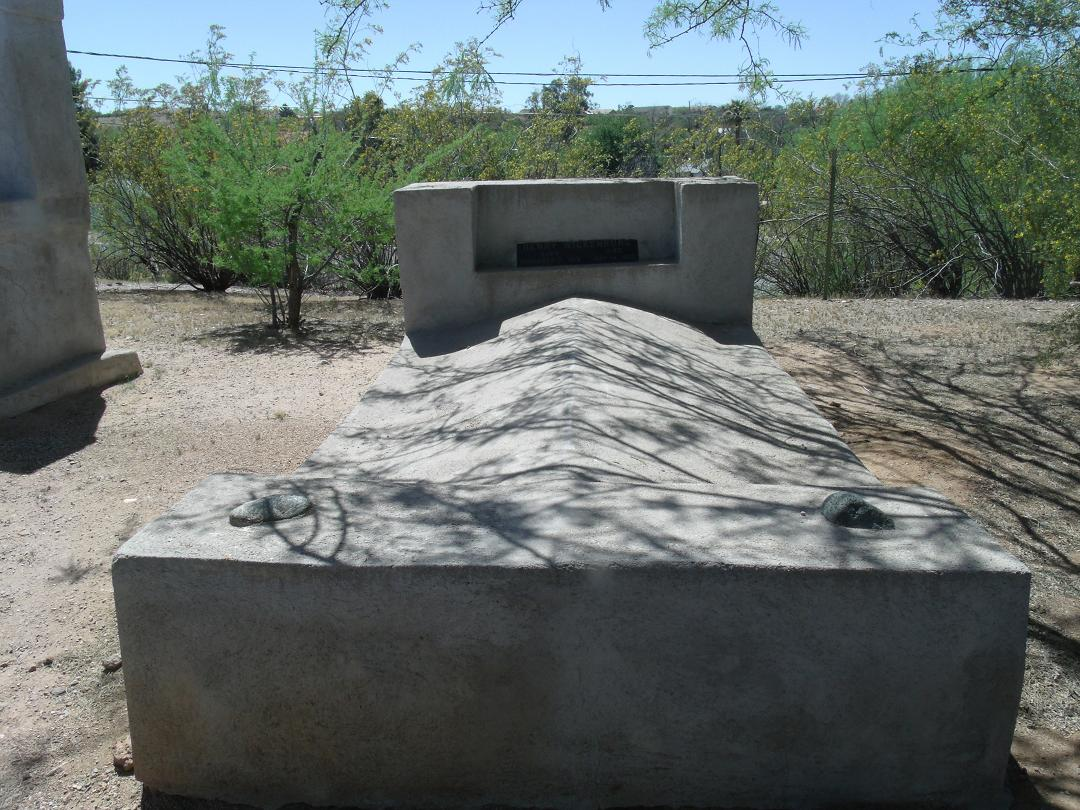
Tomb of Henry Wickenburg in the Henry Wickenburg Pioneer Cemetery located in Adams Street. The cemetery was listed in the National Register of Historic Places April 4, 2011. Reference #11000151.

The following photographs are of some of the historic structures in Wickenburg listed in the Wickenburg Chamber of Commerce.

Additional historic structures and properties.
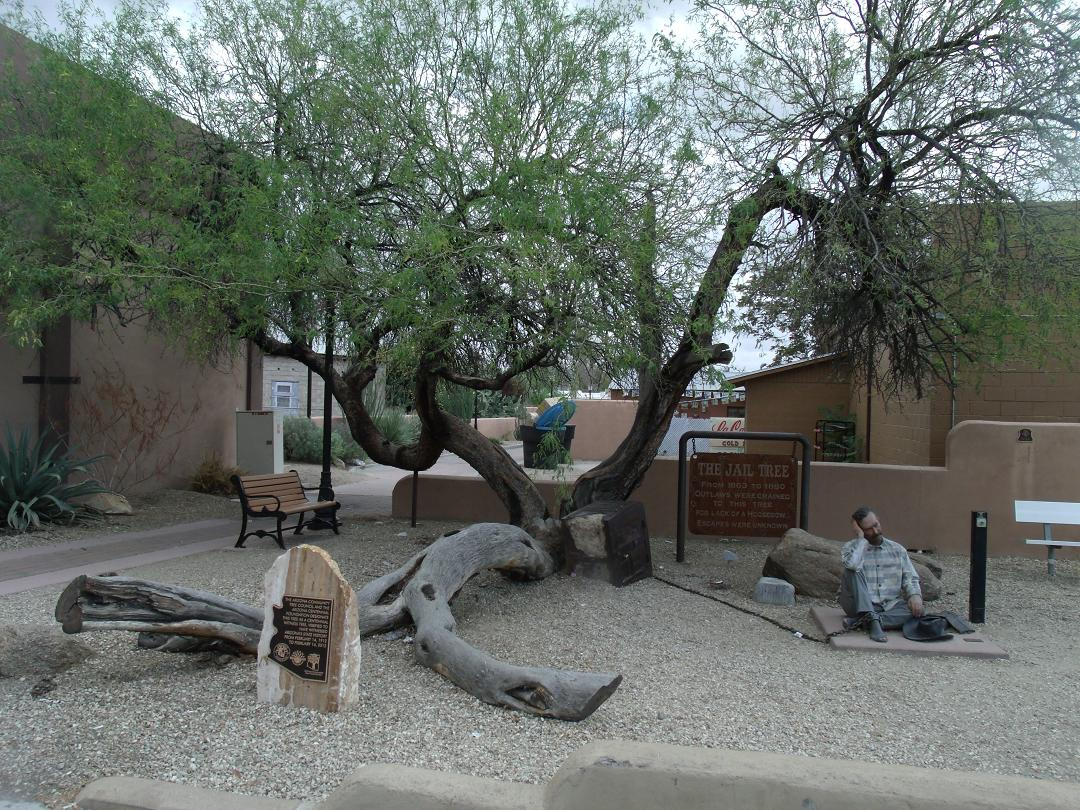
Jail Tree located in the corner of Tegner and Wickenburg Way in Wickenburg, Arizona. From 1863 to 1890, when the local jail was full of prisoners, those who did not fit in a cell were chained to this jail tree (WCC).

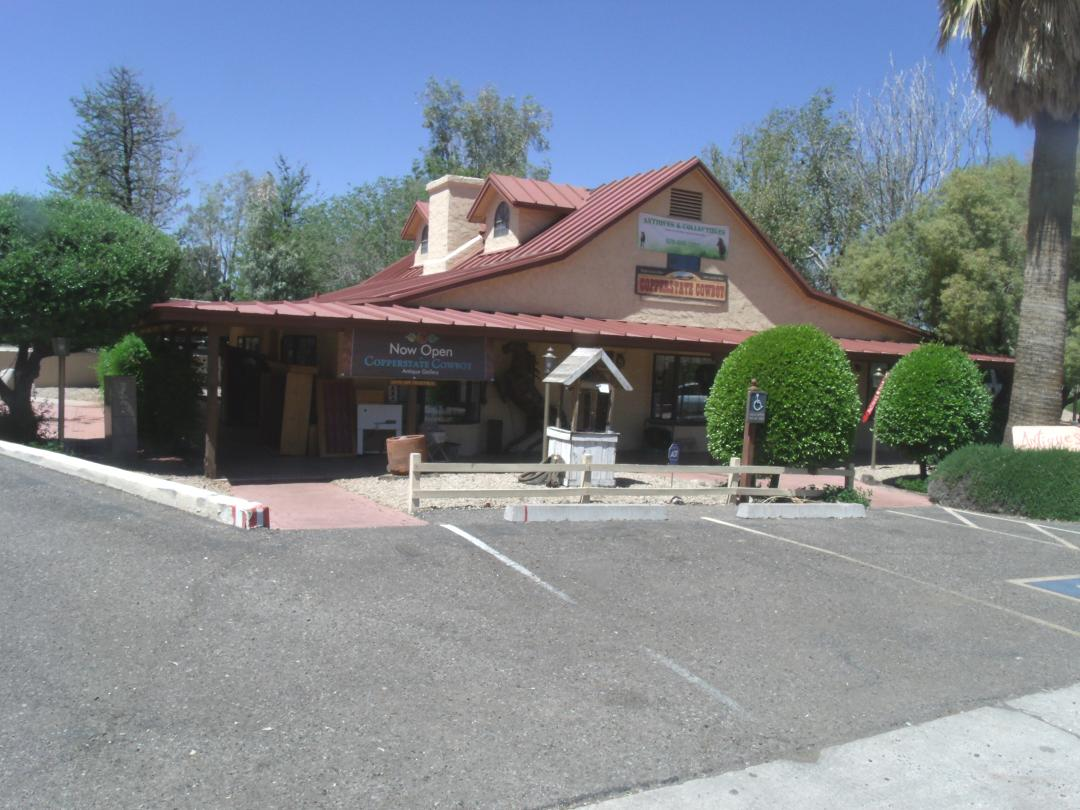
Trinidad House built in 1863. Built by the Trinidad family, this home may be the oldest house in Arizona. It served as a military post, a stage stop, and later a store.

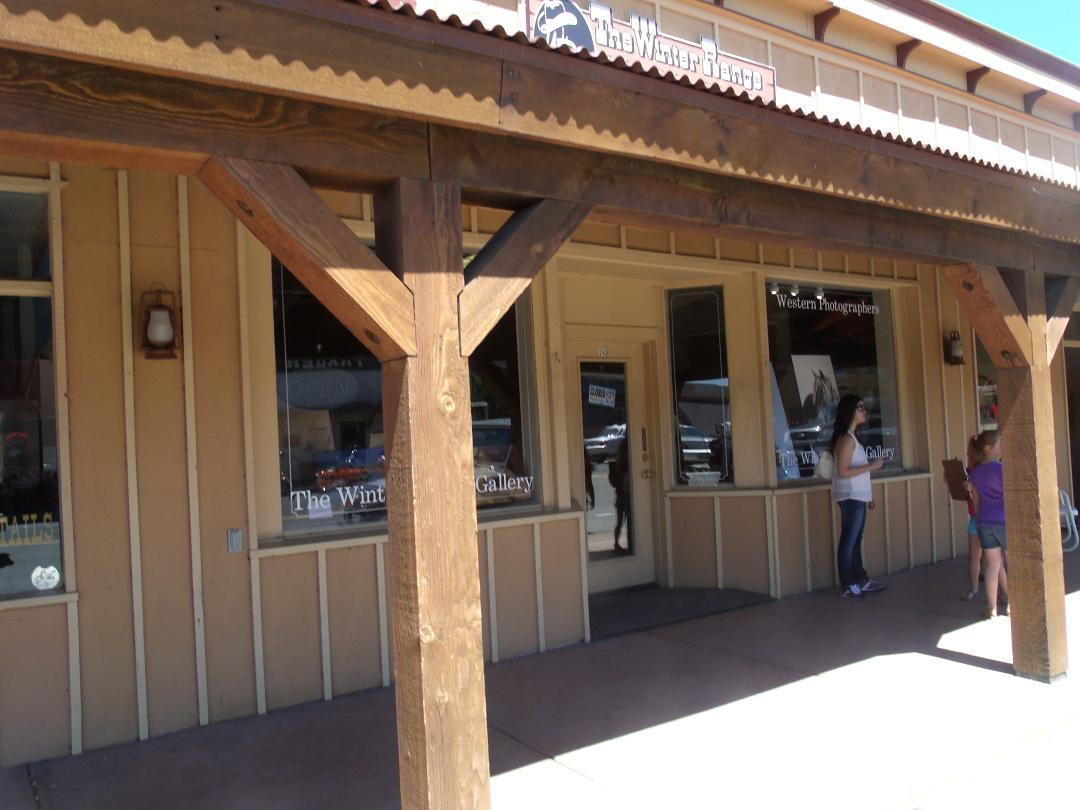
Eller General Store built in 1864.

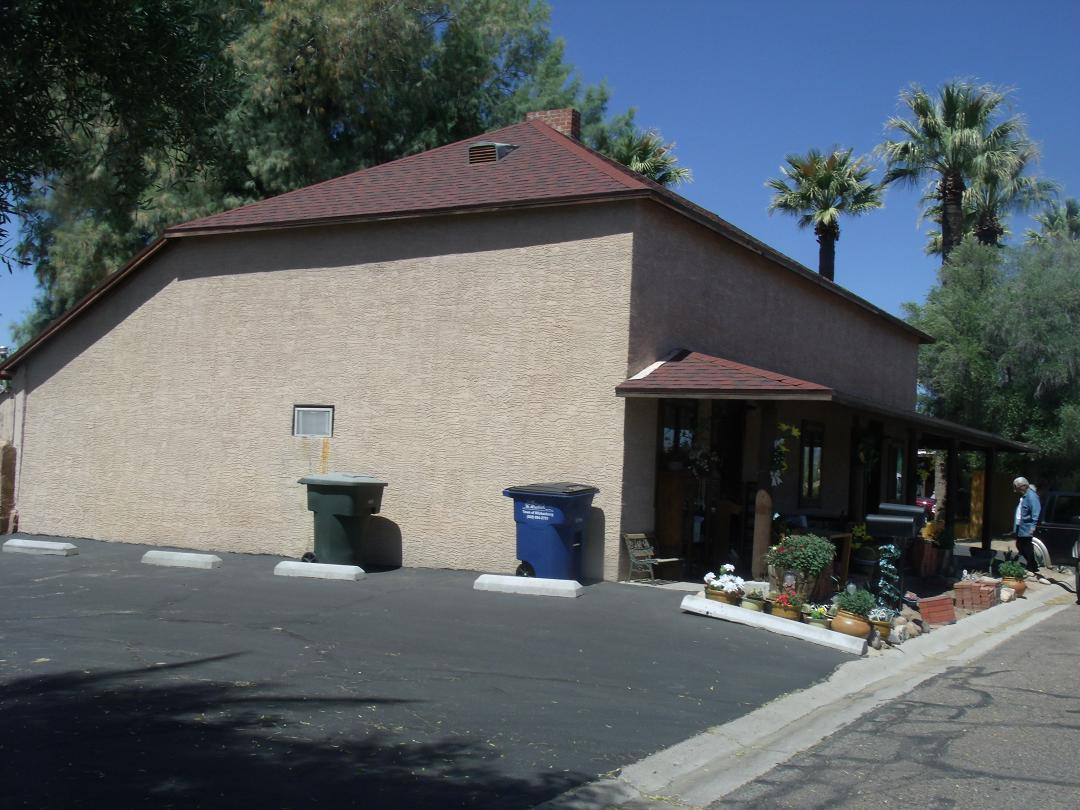
Orosco and Kerkes House built in 1869. The house was owned by Fernando Orosco, a Hispanic pioneer. From 1922 until 1942 it was the home of Mr. & Mrs. Mike Kerkes.

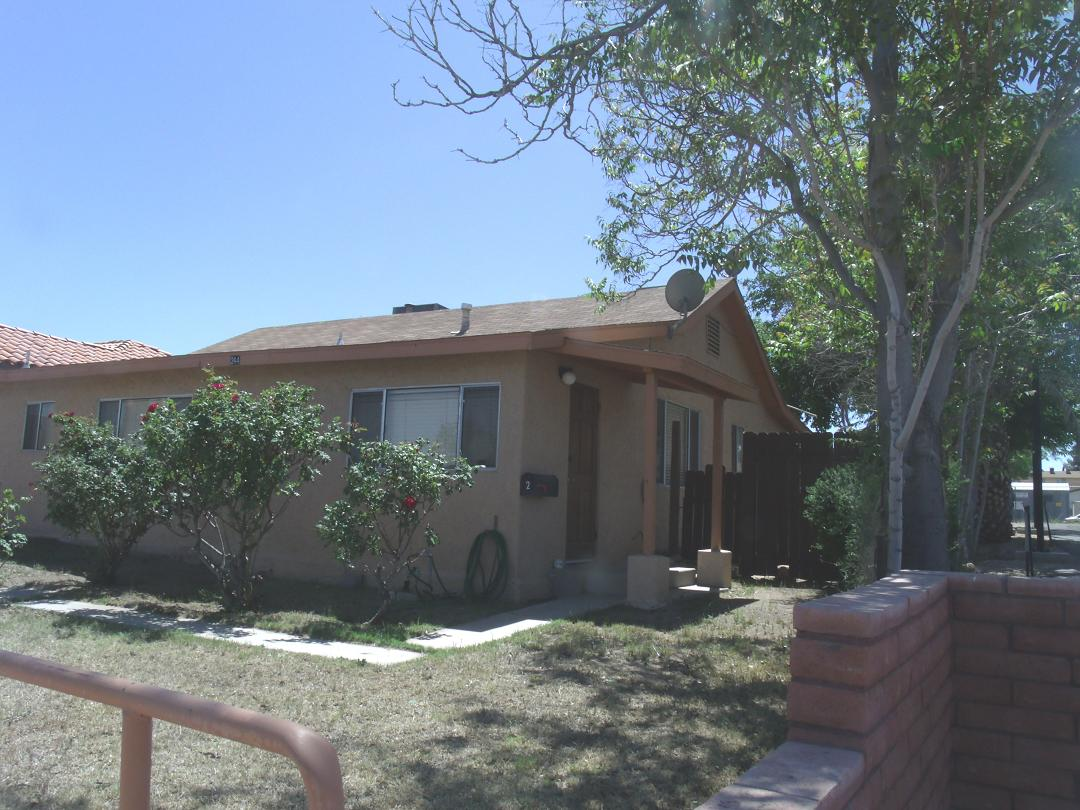
Villa House built in 1890. This was the home of one of Wickenburg’s Hispanic pioneer families.

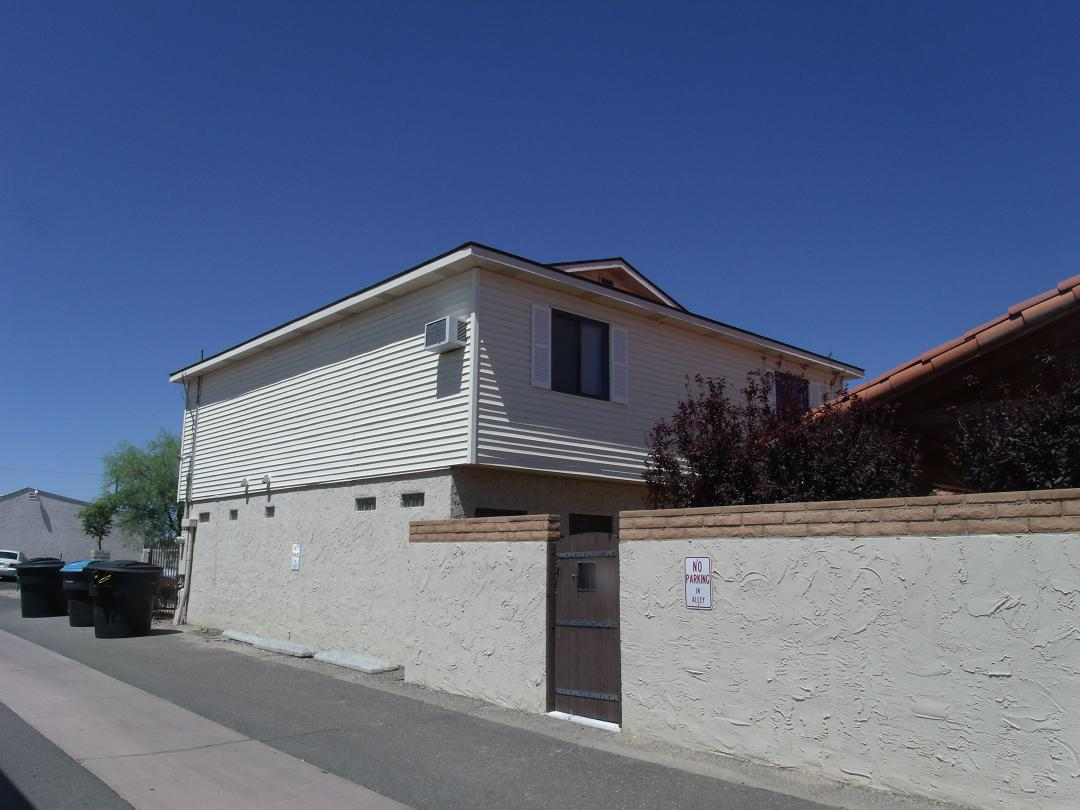
Hyders Livery Stable built in 1890. As cars replaced horses, the livery stable and the corner building became a garage and dealership. It is now a parish house.

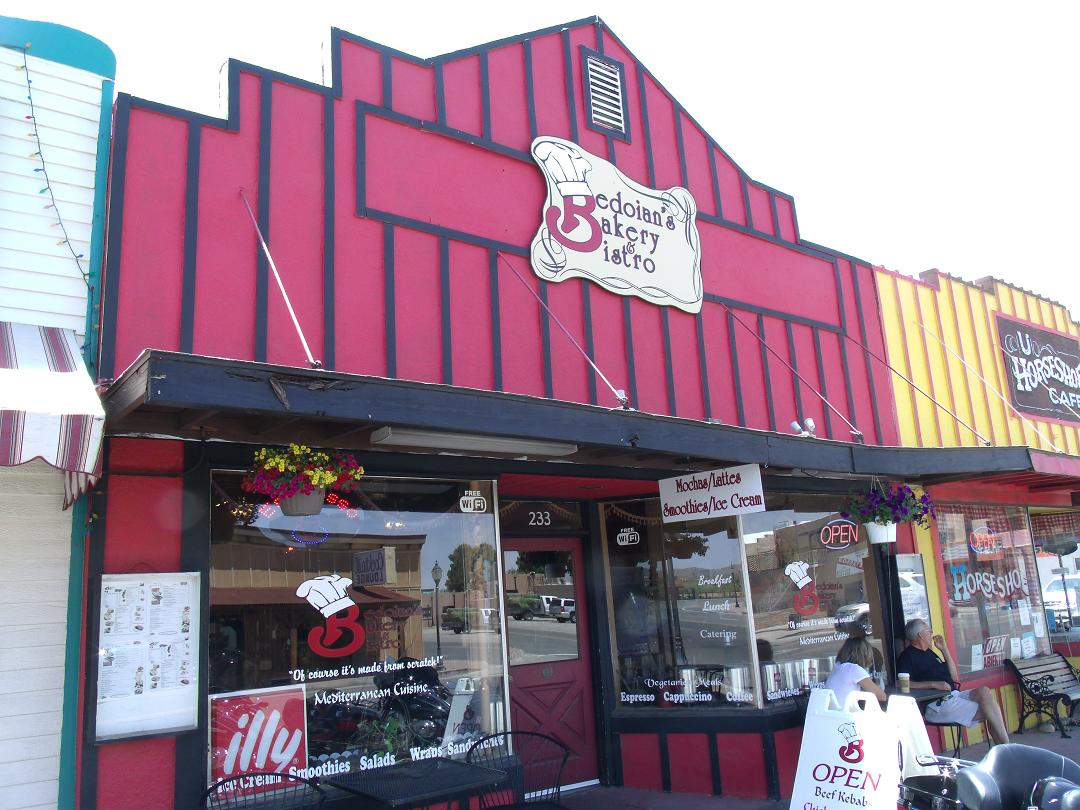
Historic Pastime Pool Hall building was built in 1893 and is located in Wickenbrg, Arizona. The building first served as Tollman Grocery and then the Pastime Pool Hall as late as World War II. It is listed as historic by the Wickenburg Chamber of Commerce Wickenburg.

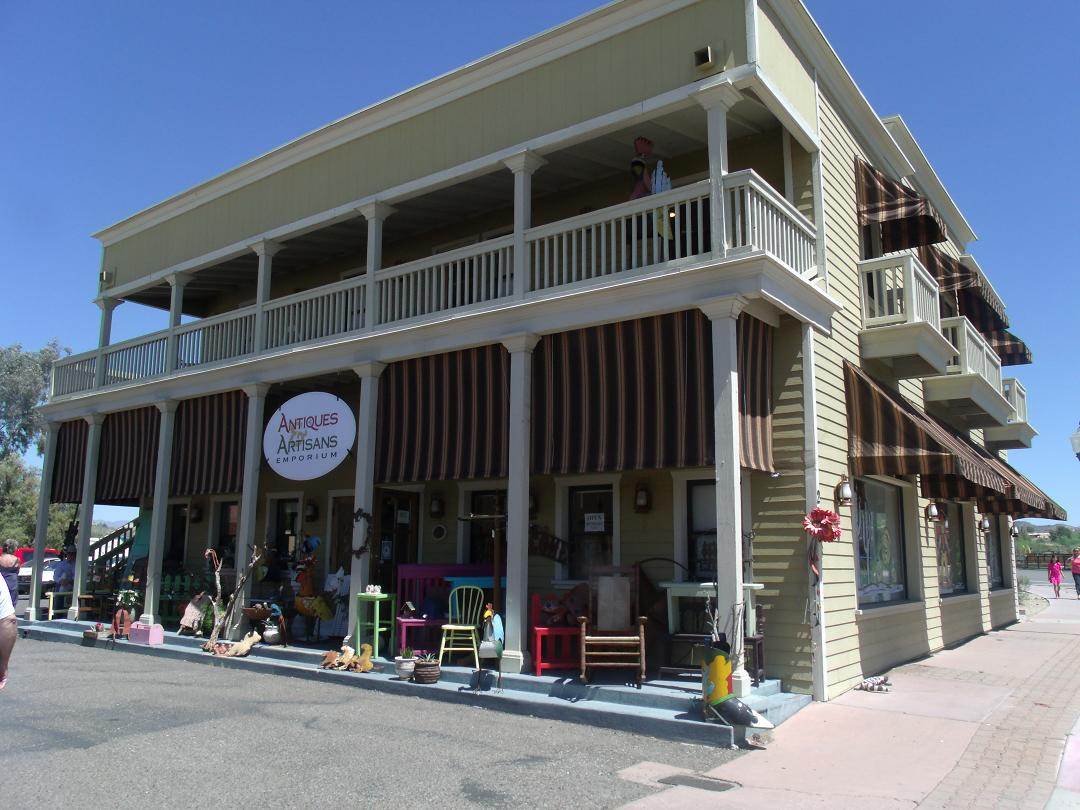
Texas Hotel built in 1895. At first located in the mining area, it was moved to this location circa 1904. Owned and operated by Everett and Myrtle Coxwell, the hotel had a restaurant on the street floor and eight rental units upstairs.

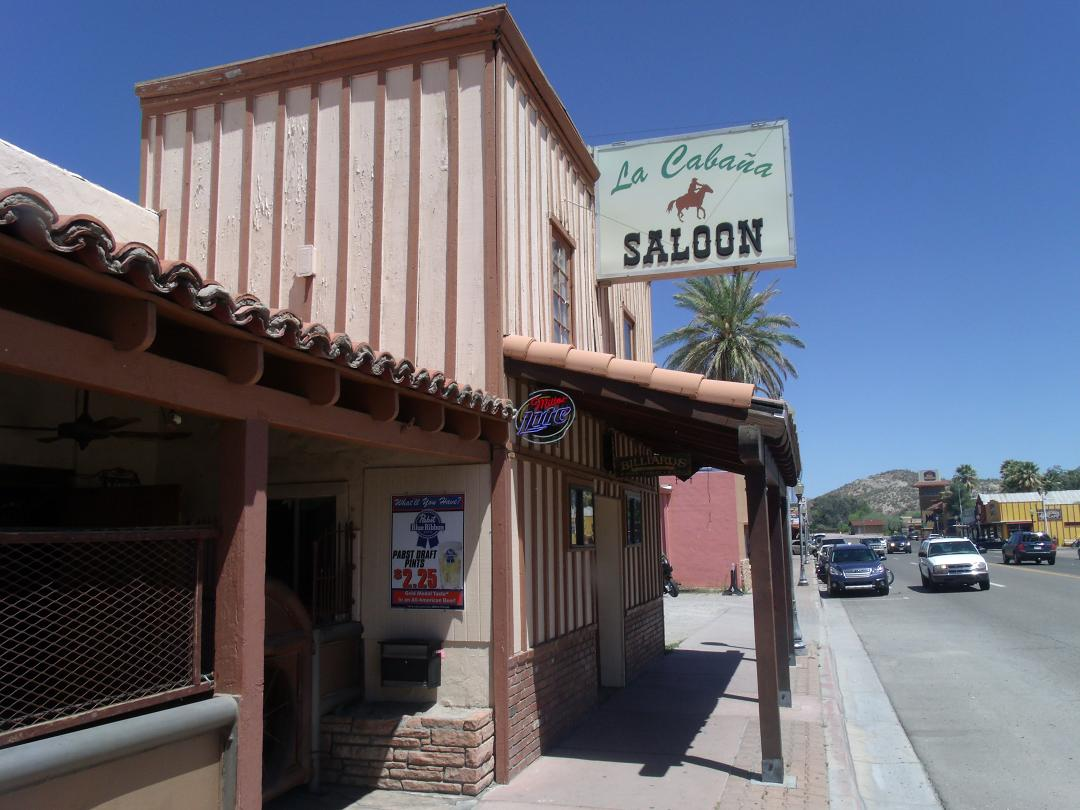
WW Bass House built in 1908. It was the home of Mr. & Mrs. Bass. Mr. Bass was one of Arizona’s pioneer photographers.

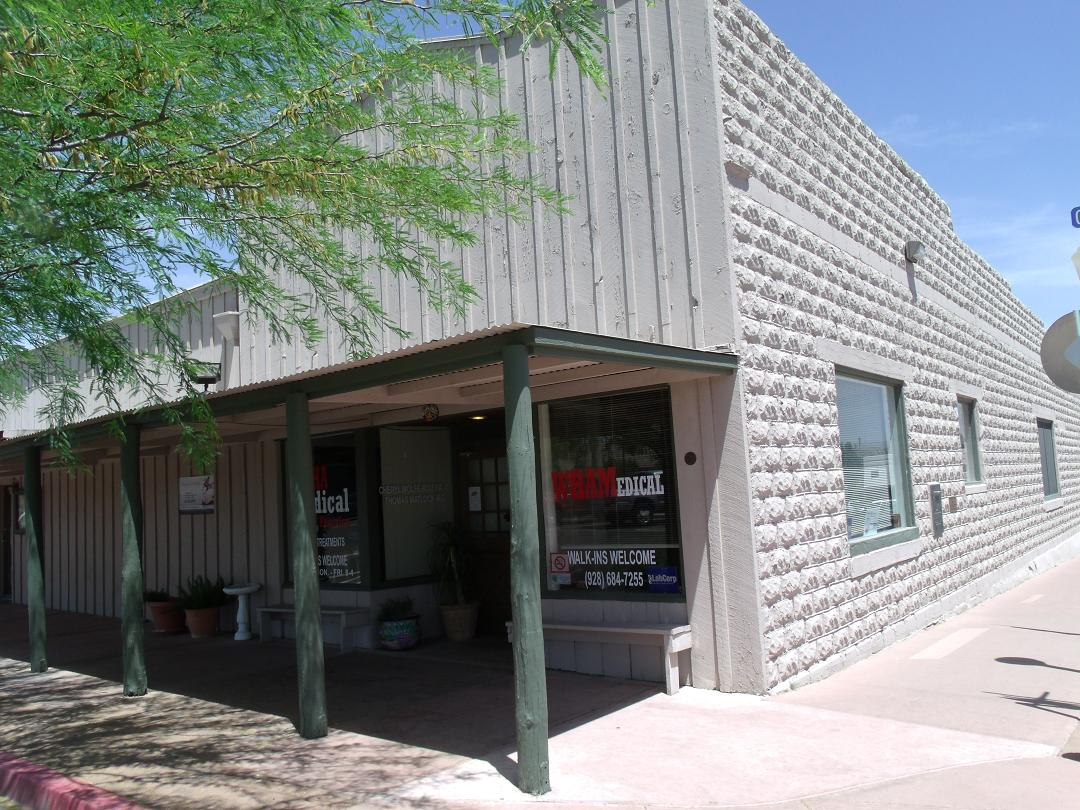
The Wickenburg Drug Company first occupied this building, built in 1918, at the corner of Apache and Frontier Streets in Wickenburg, Arizona. It was followed by Jones’ Pharmacy. This building with its molded cement blocks housed Valley National Bank/ Bank One from 1946-1995. It is listed as historical by the Wickenburg Chamber of Commerce Wickenburg.

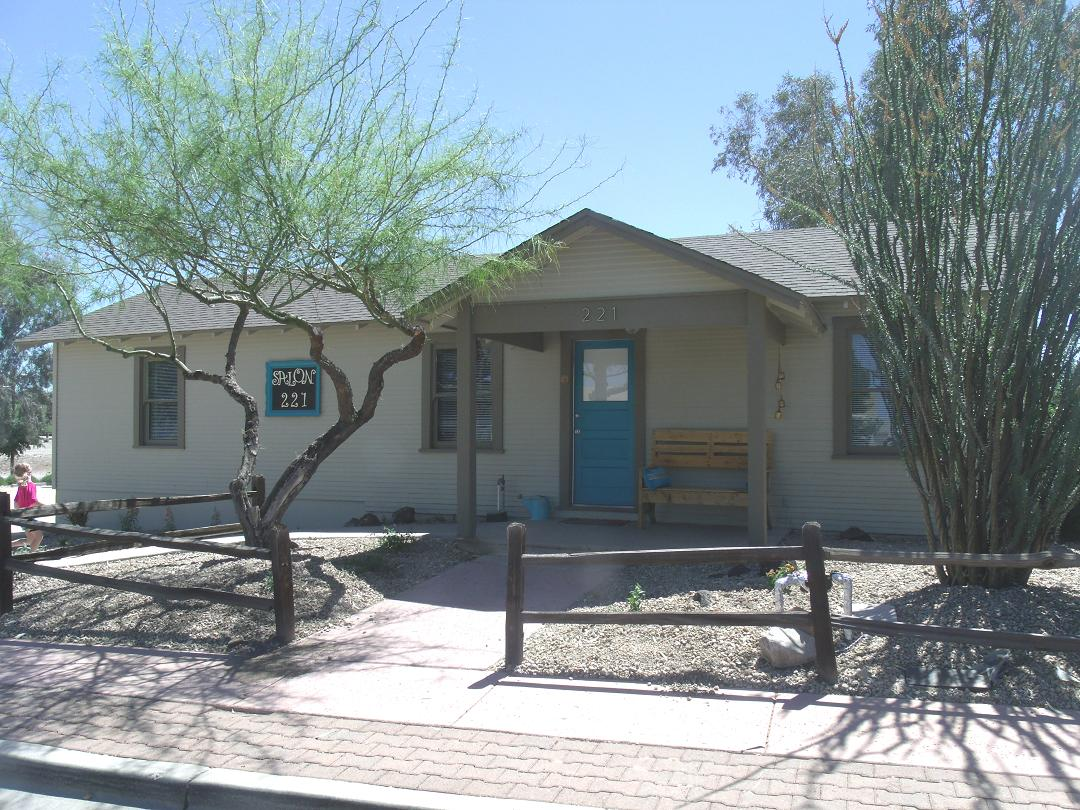
Garcia-Ocampo House built in 1921. This residence was built by Marcella Ocampo, local business woman and a member of one of Wickenburg’s early pioneer Hispanic families.

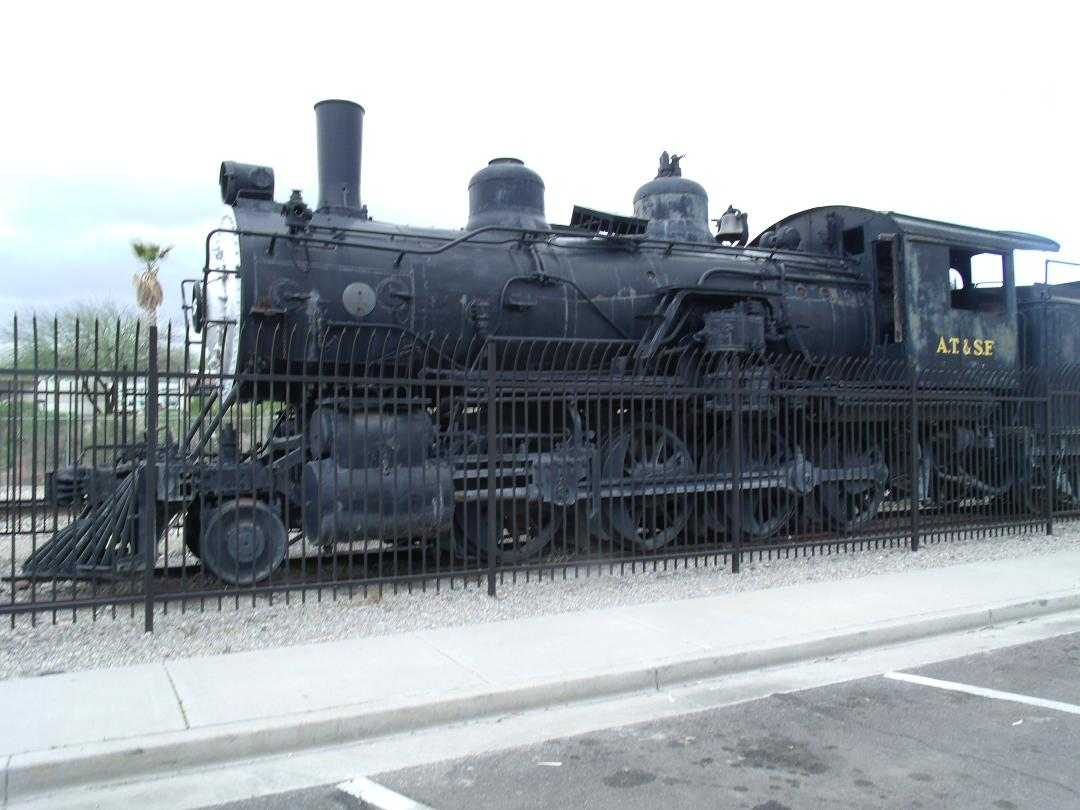
Engine 761 was built around 1890 for the Atchison, Topeka and Santa Fe Railroad. It is a Class 759, 2-8-0. When active, it was used on the main line between Chicago and the west. Engine 761 is located next to the historic Wickenburg train depot, that is now the town's visitor center(WCC).

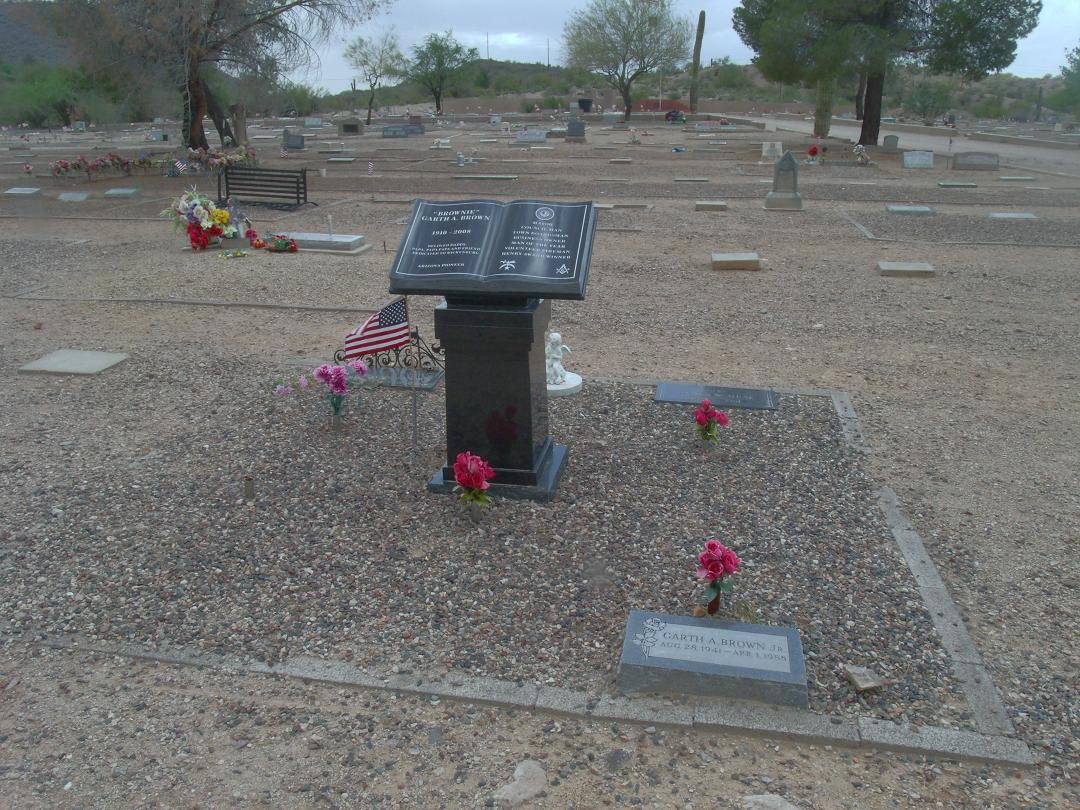
Gravesite of Garth A. Brown in Wickenburg Municipal Cemetery. Brown served as Mayor of Wickenburg from 1970 to 1972.

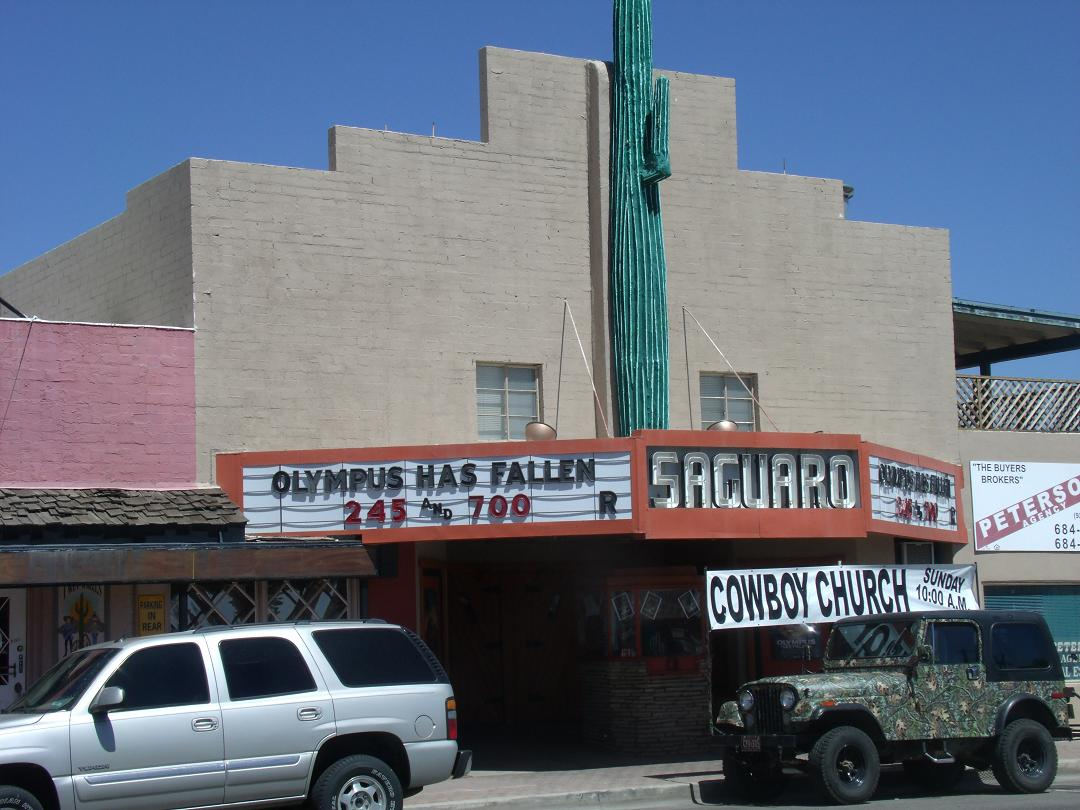
Saguaro Theatre built in 1948 by Dwight "Red" Harkins.

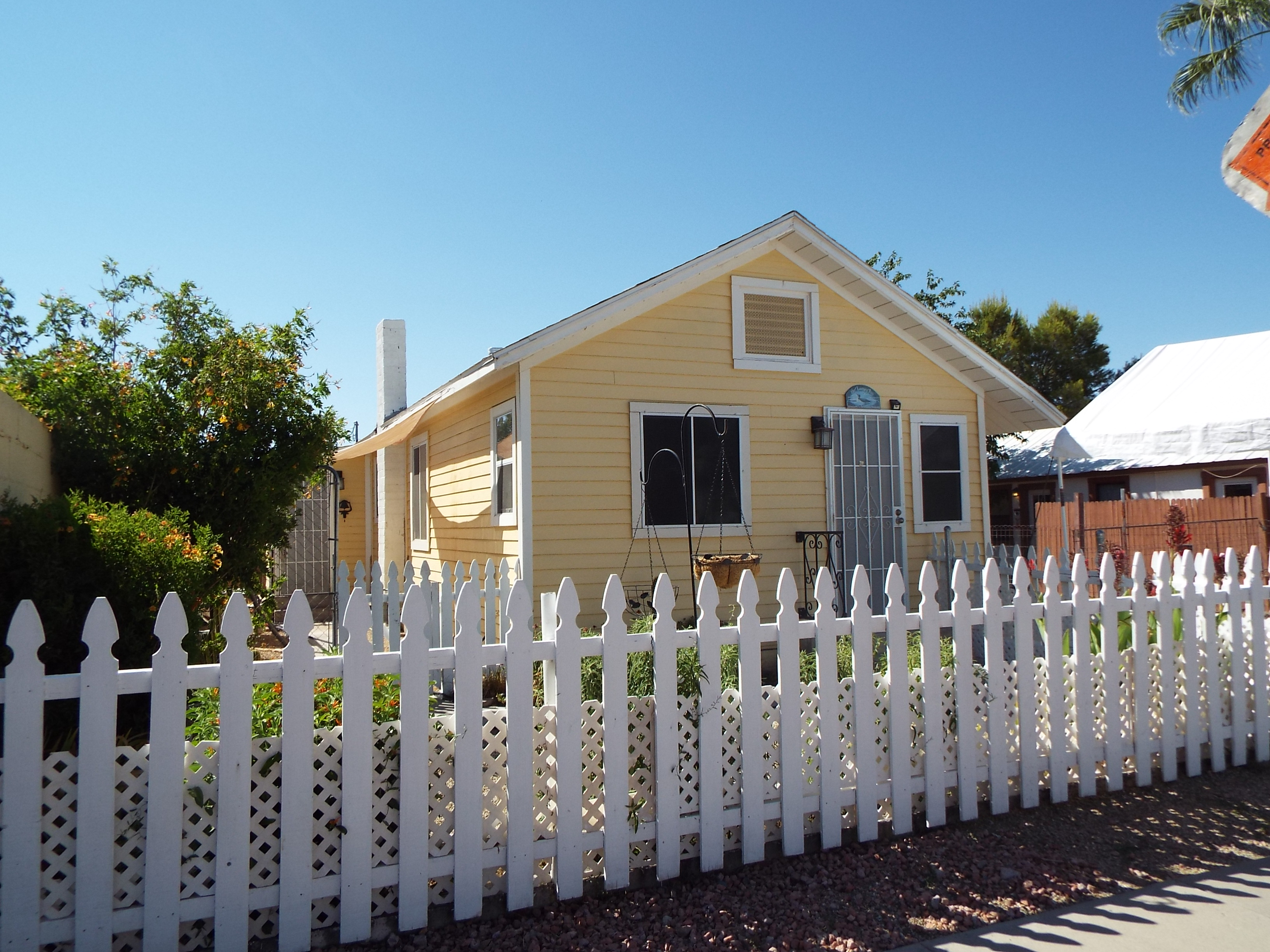
This house was built in the 1920s and was moved to Apache Street from the Vulture Mine area.

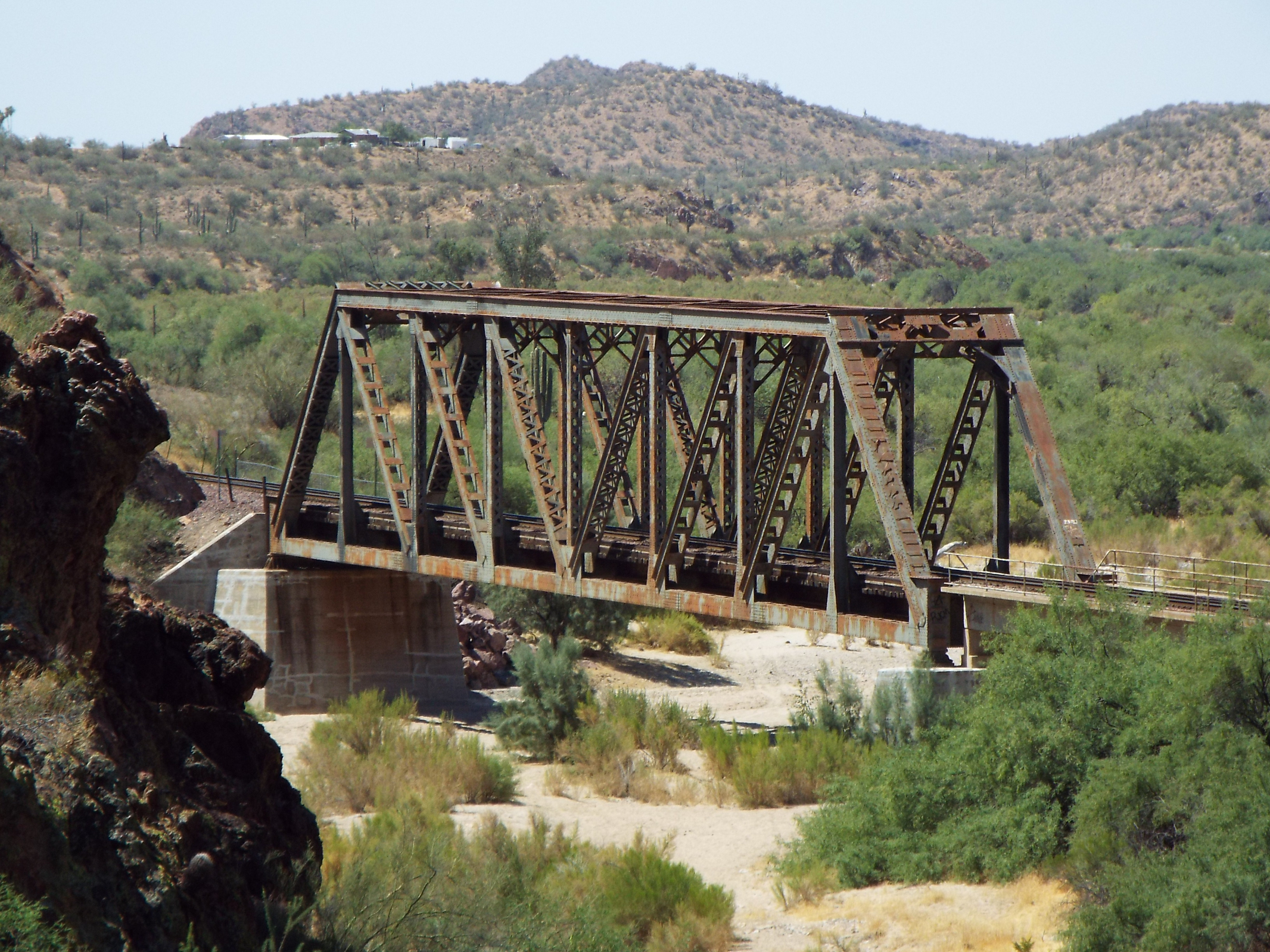
Pratt through truss BNSF Railroad Bridge, built in 1930, across the Hassayampa River in Wickenburg.

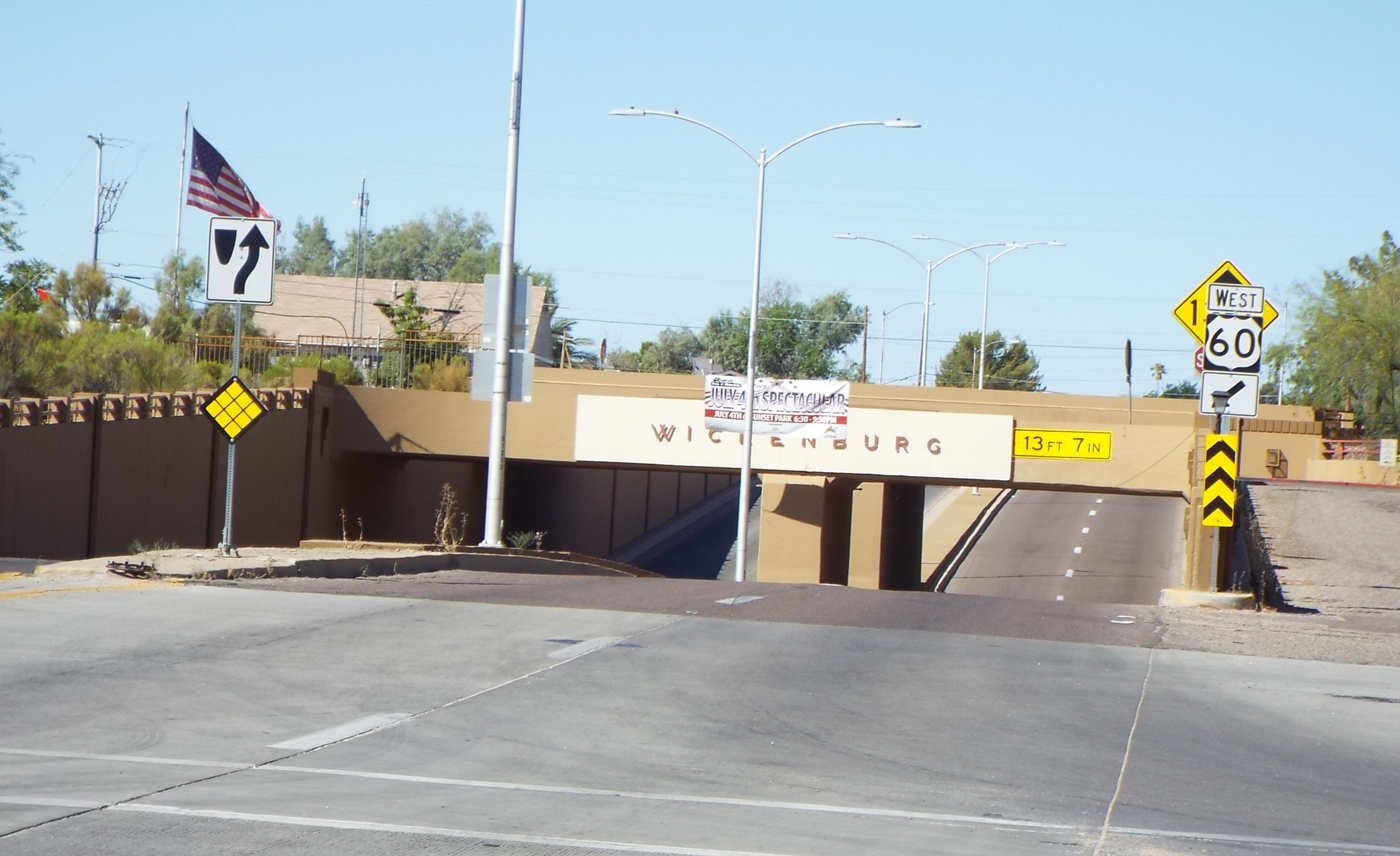
The Wickenburg Underpass was completed in 1937. One bridge carries railroad traffic while the other carries vehicular traffic.

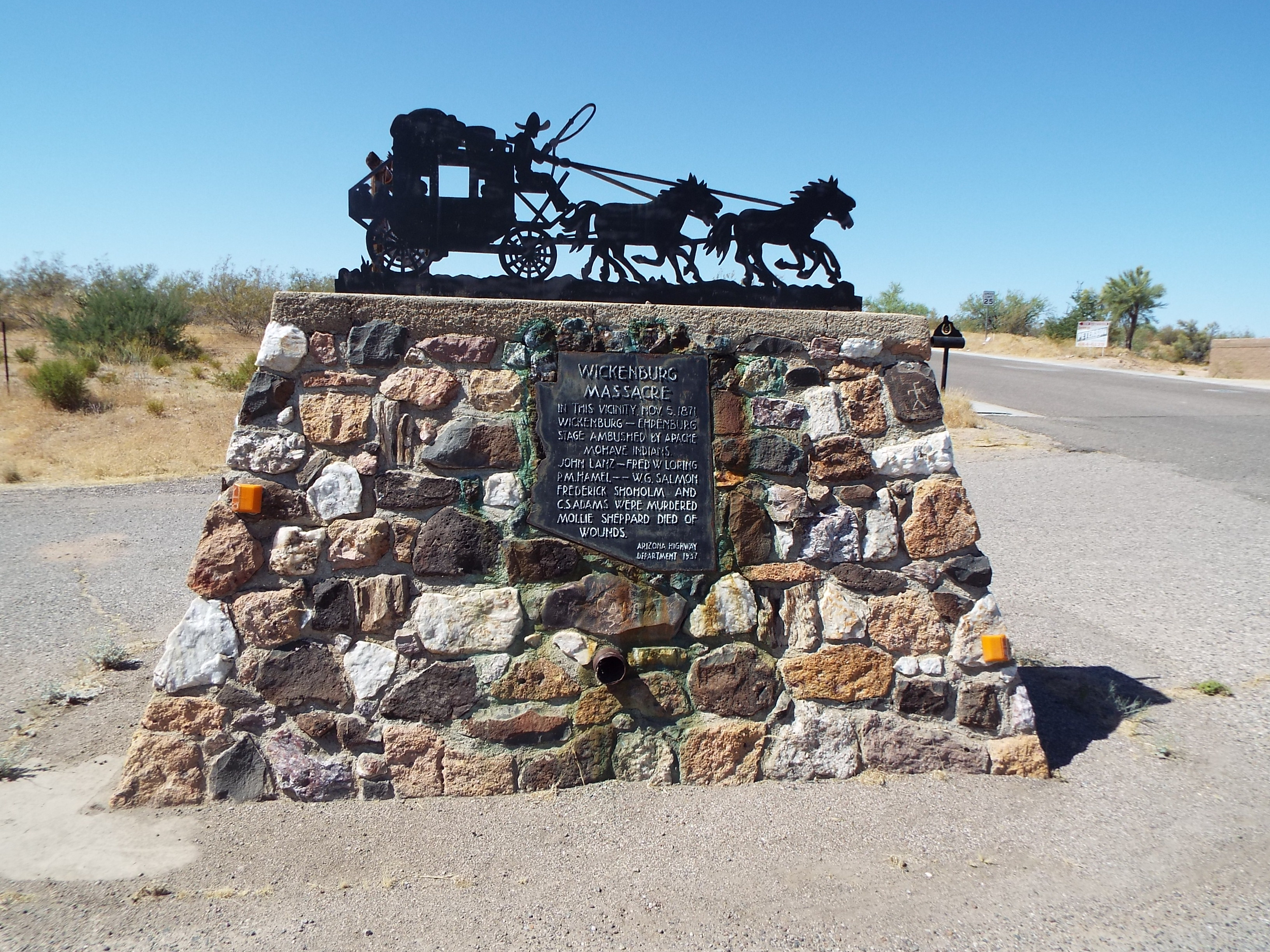
Vicinity marker where the Wickenburg Massacre took place. The Wickenburg Massacre was the mass murder of six stagecoach passengers en route from Wickenburg, Arizona Territory, westbound for San Bernardino, California, on the La Paz road on November 5, 1871.

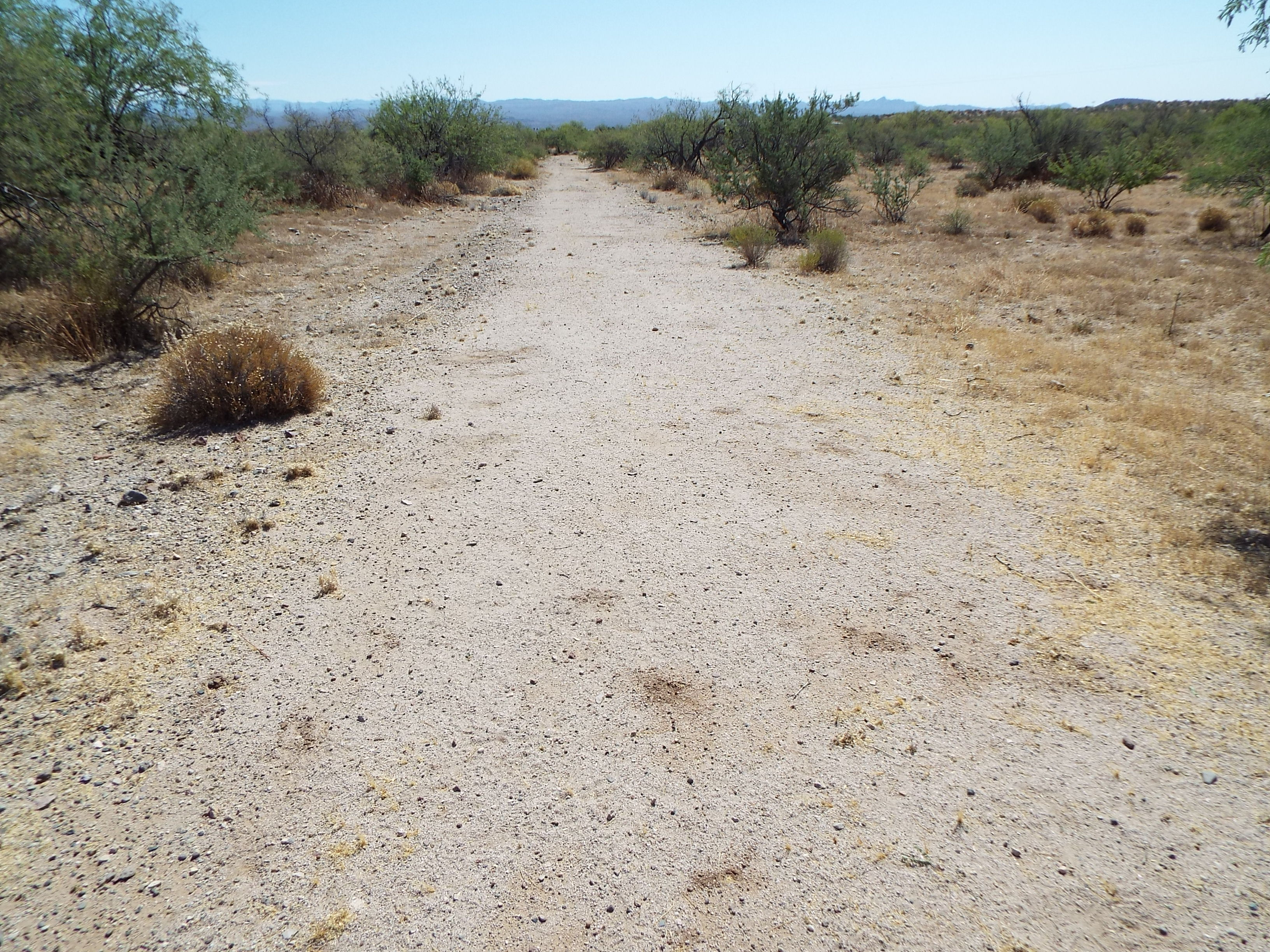
Old Stage Coach Road where the November 5, 1871, Wickenburg Massacre occurred.

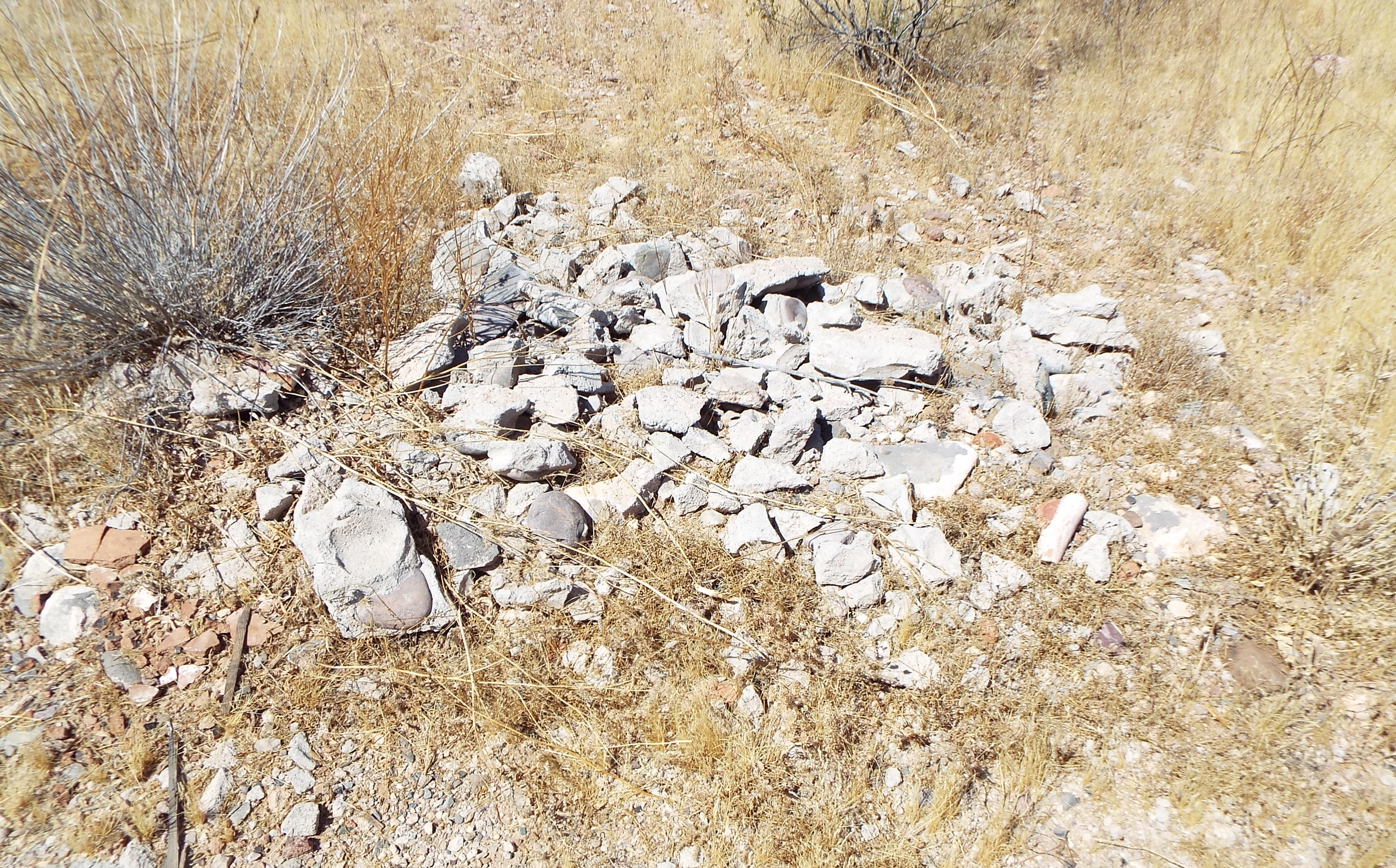
Grave of one of the November 5, 1871, Wickenburg Massacre victims.
Historic Vulture City (Ghost town) and the Vulture Mine

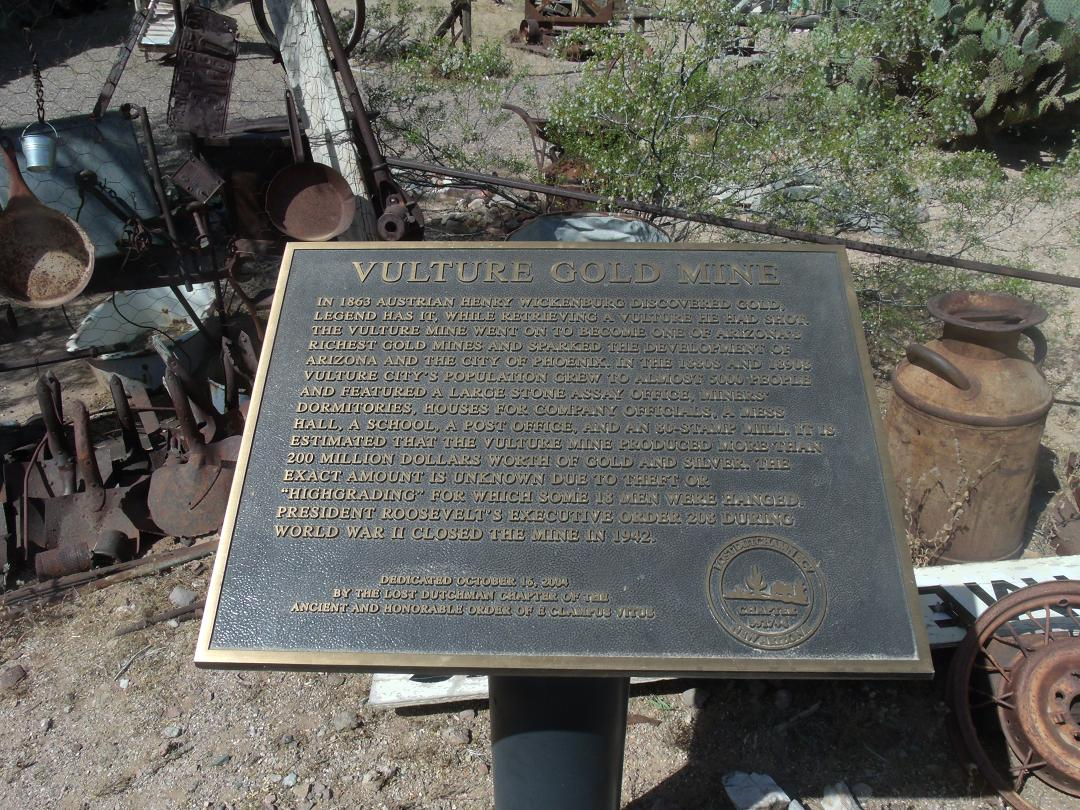
Vulture Mine Historic Marker

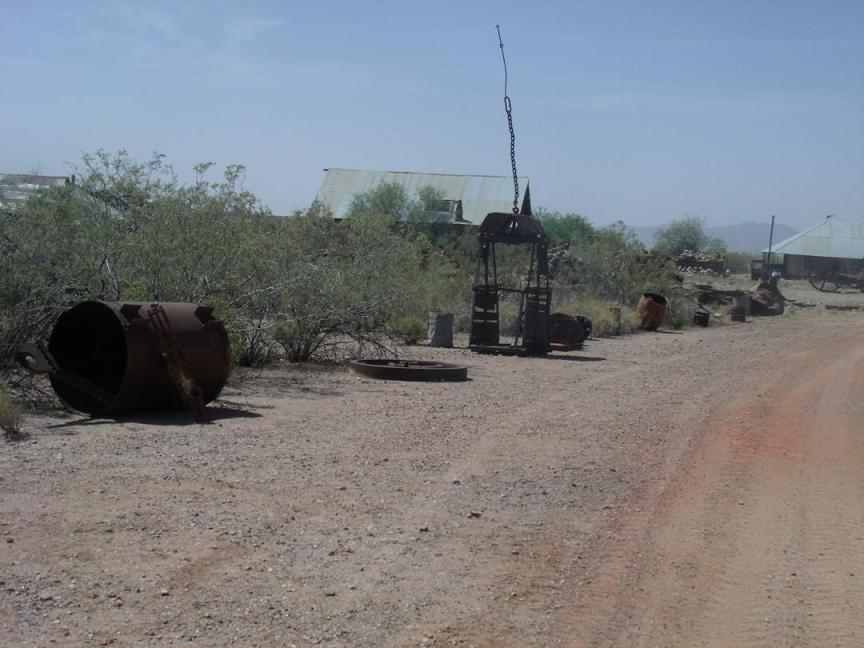
Some of the mining equipment once used.

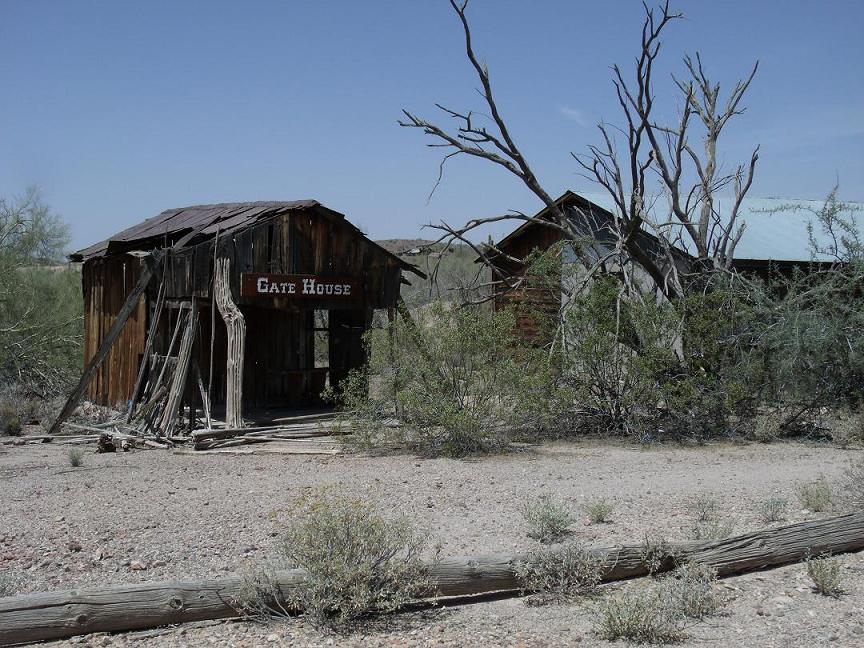
Vulture City Gate House.

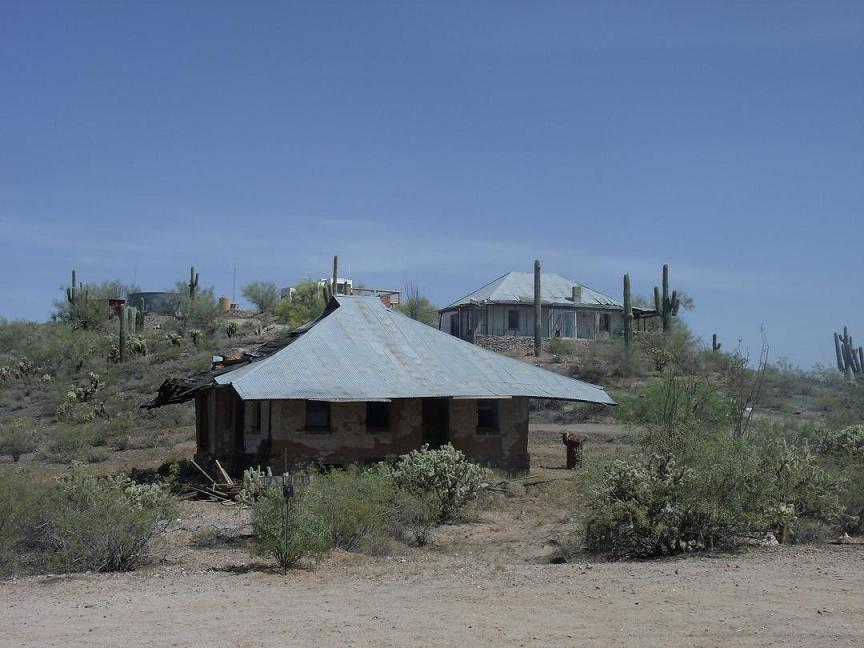
Vulture City Ghost town houses.

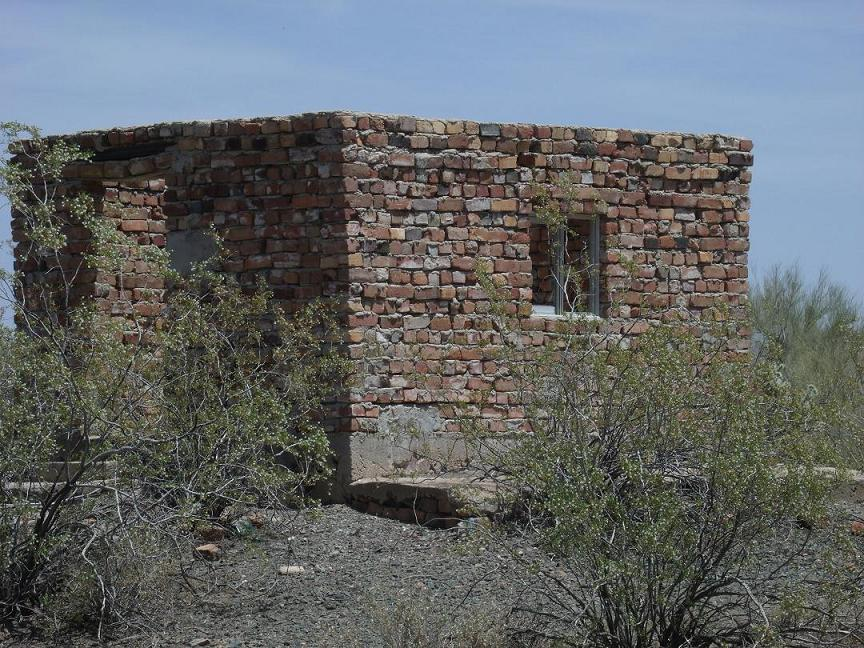
Vulture City Dynamite House where dynamite and ammo was stored.

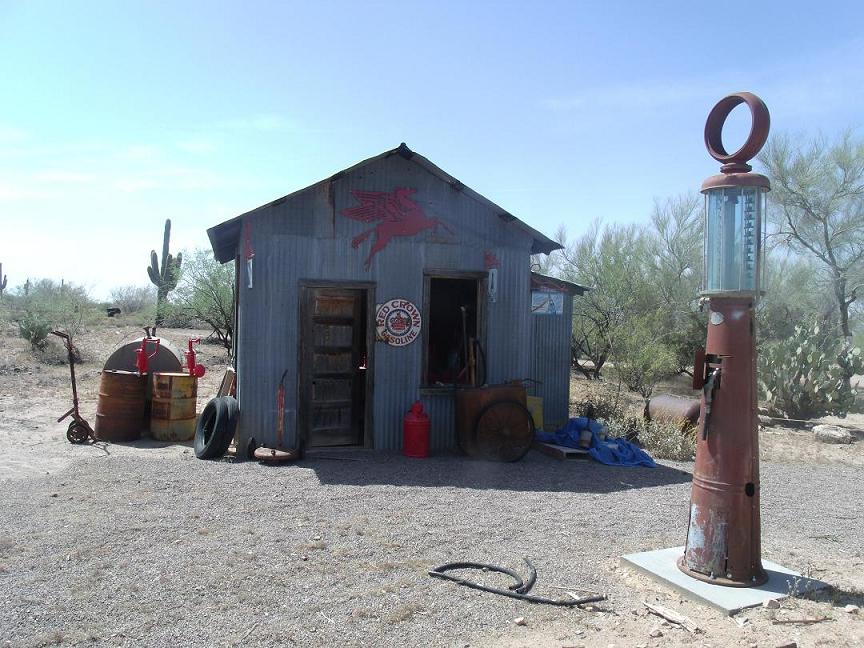
Vulture City Gas Station.

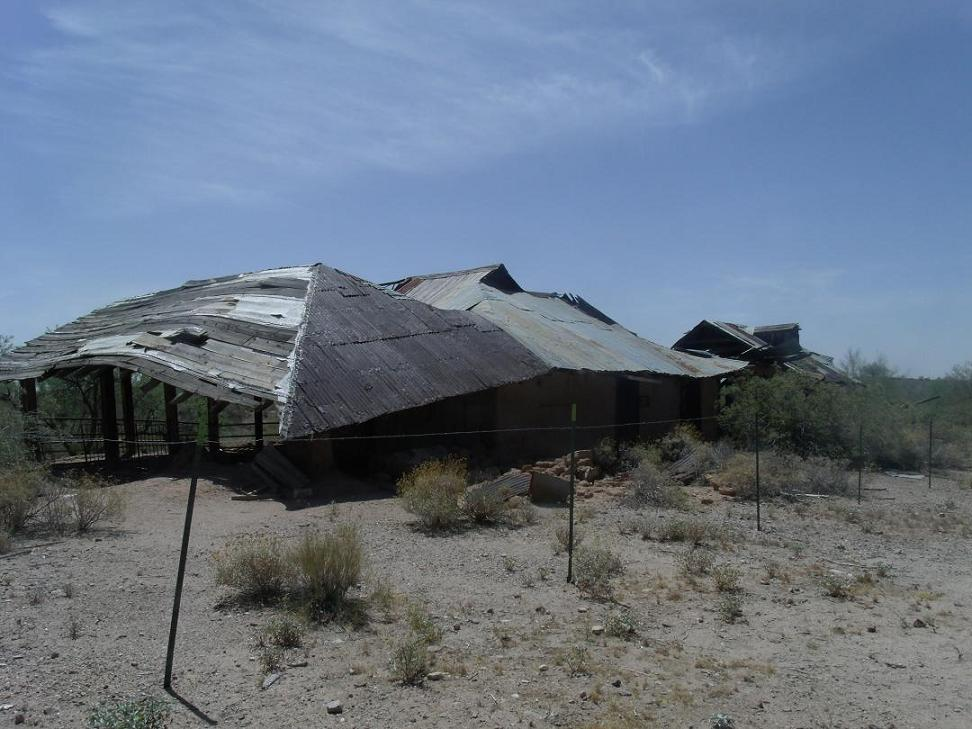
The Vulture City Workshop.

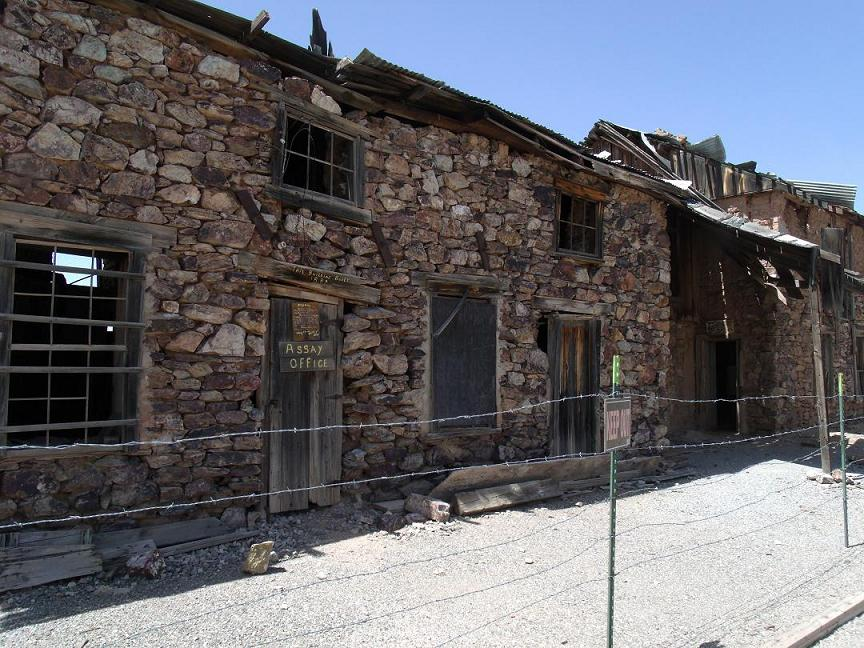
The Vulture Mine-Assay office, built in 1884.

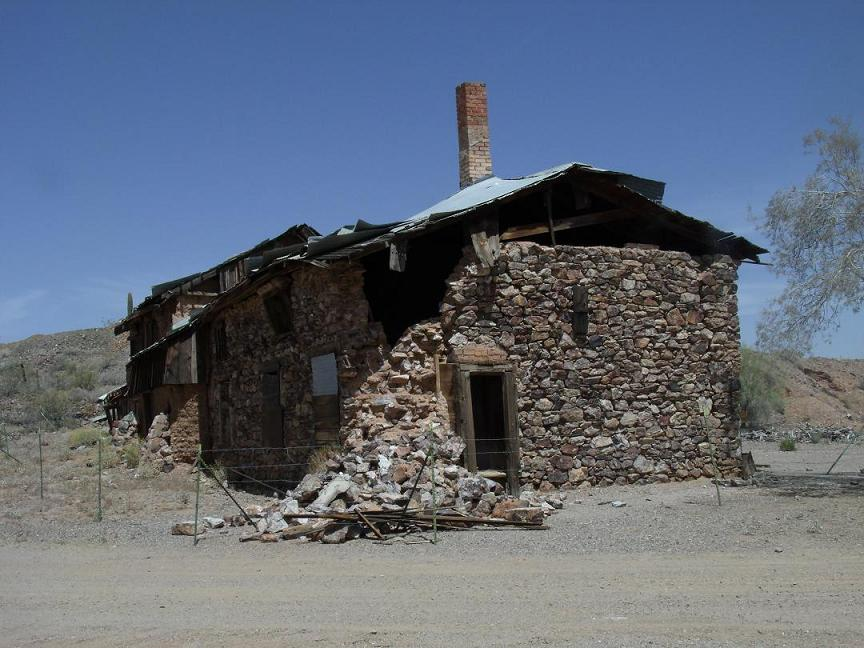
Side view of the Vulture Mine-Assay office

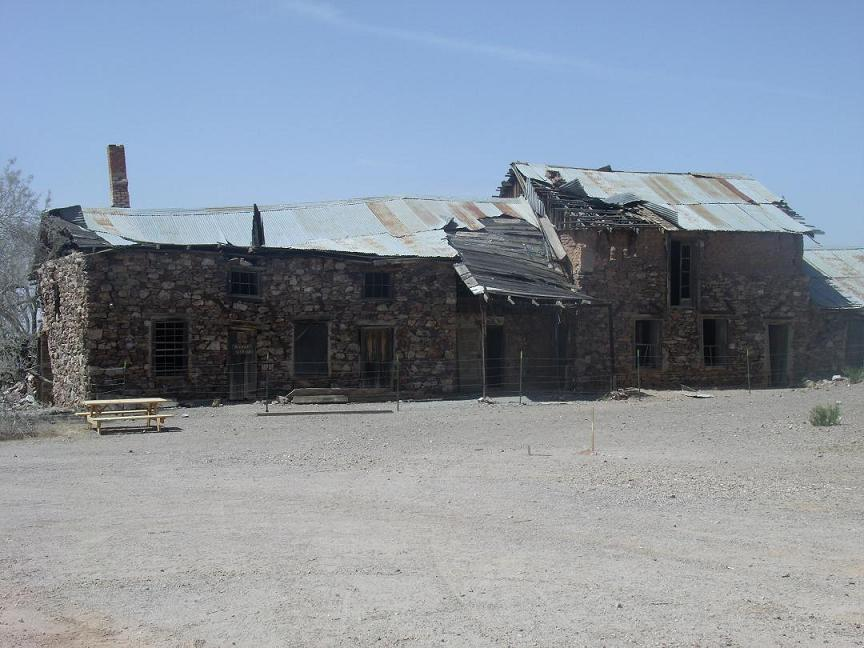
Full view of the Vulture_Mine-Assay office.

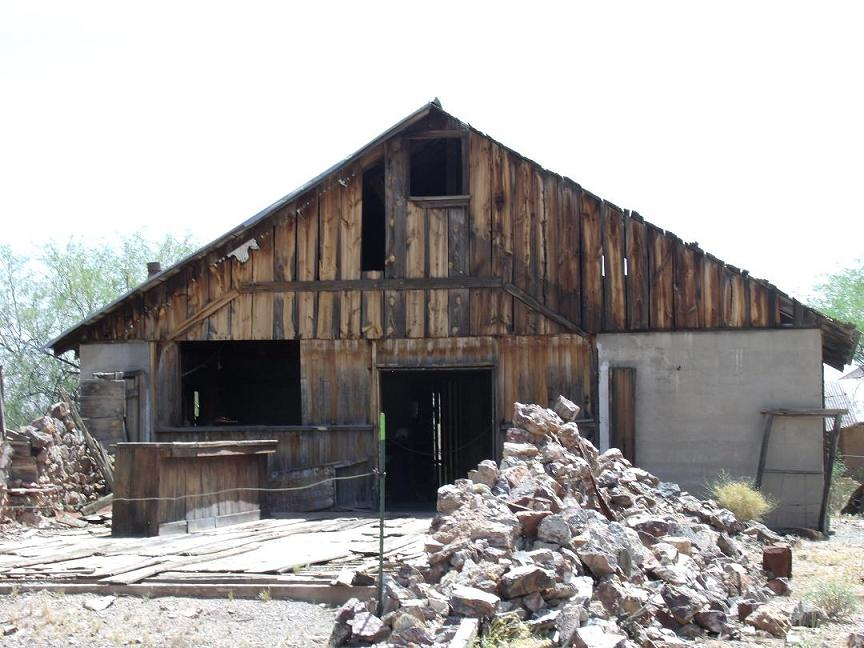
Vulture City Chow House where the miners ate.

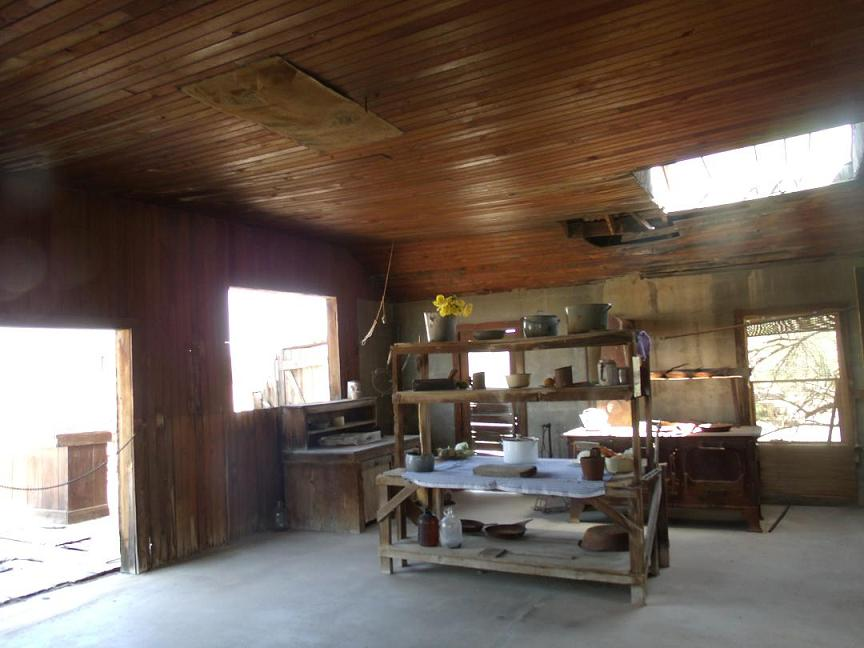
The kitchen of the Vulture City Chow House.

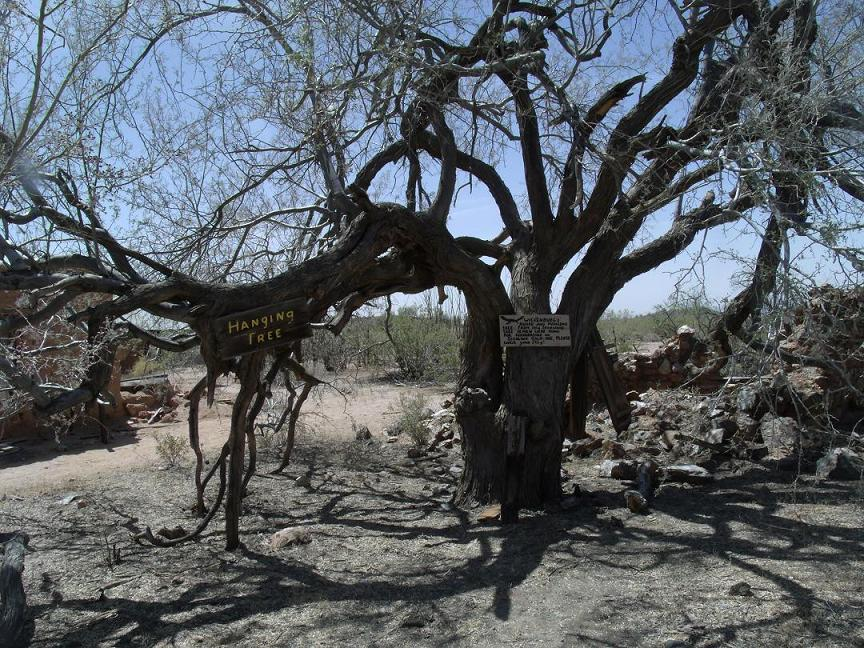
Vulture City Hanging Tree.

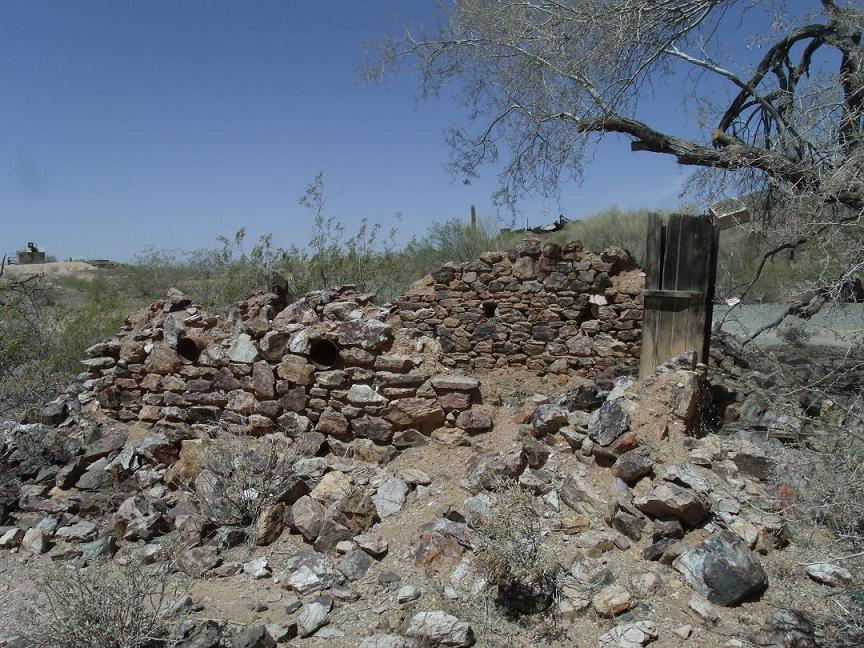
The ruins of Henry Wickenburg's Settlers Home in Vulture City.

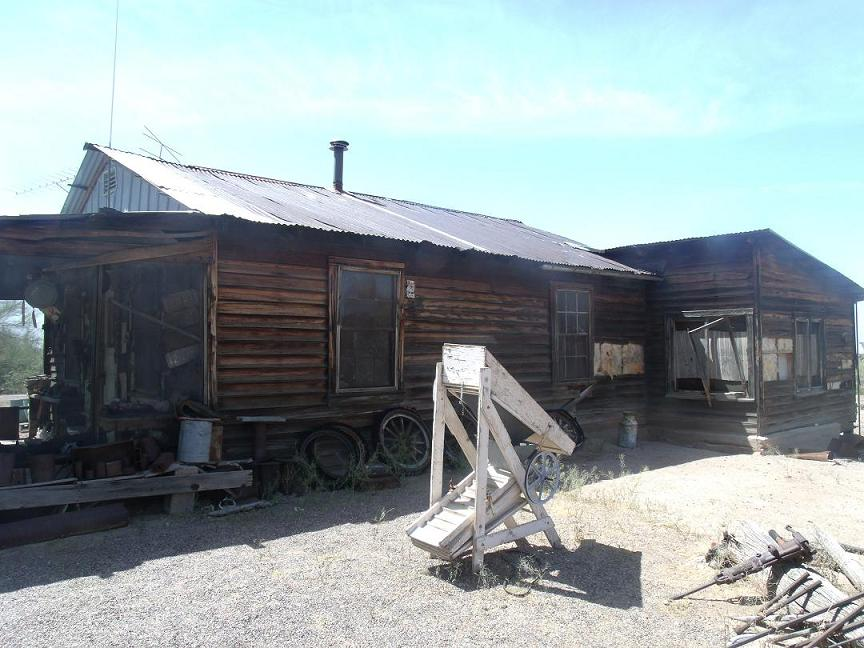
One of the Miners Living Quarters in Vulture City.

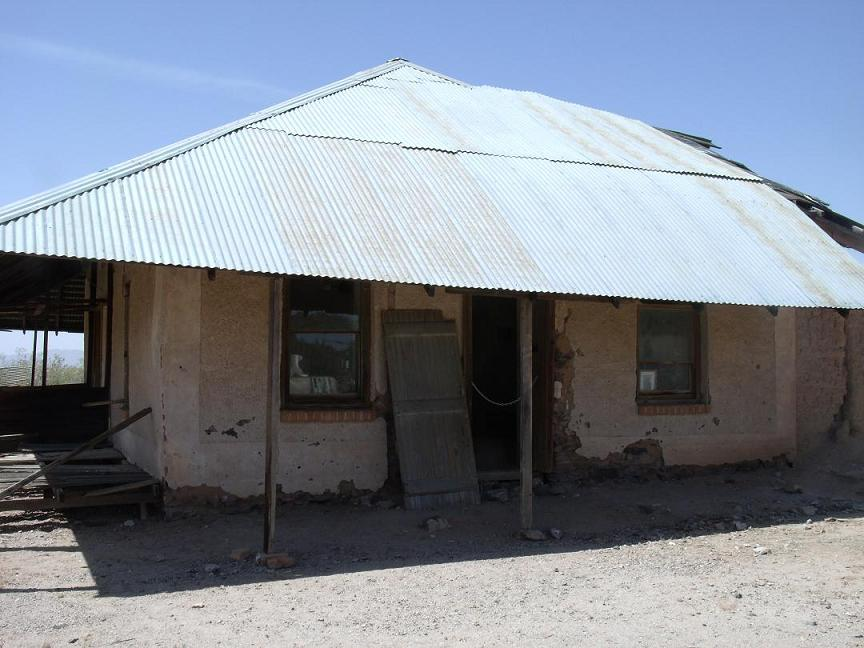
Rita's Brothel in Vulture City.

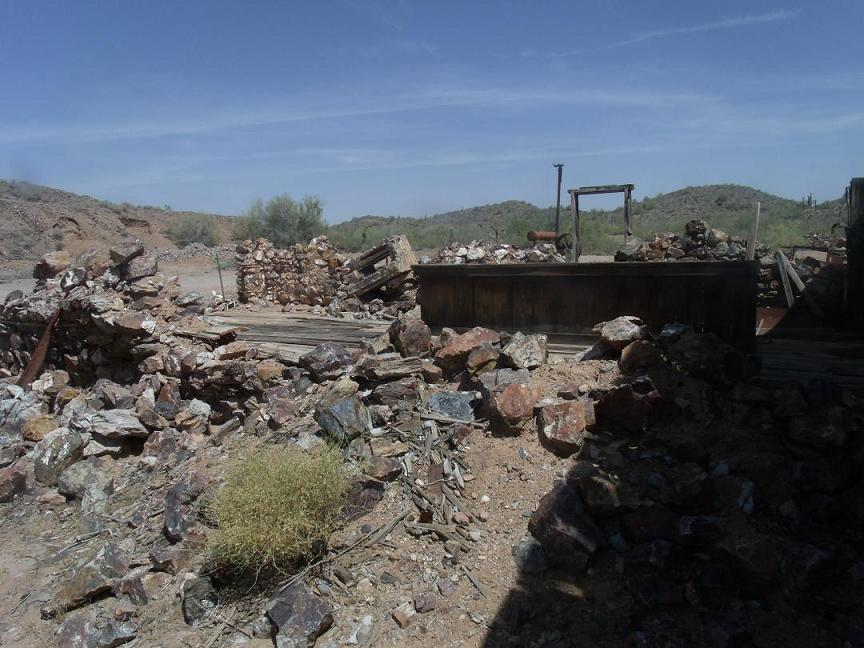
The ruins of the Vulture City Saloon.

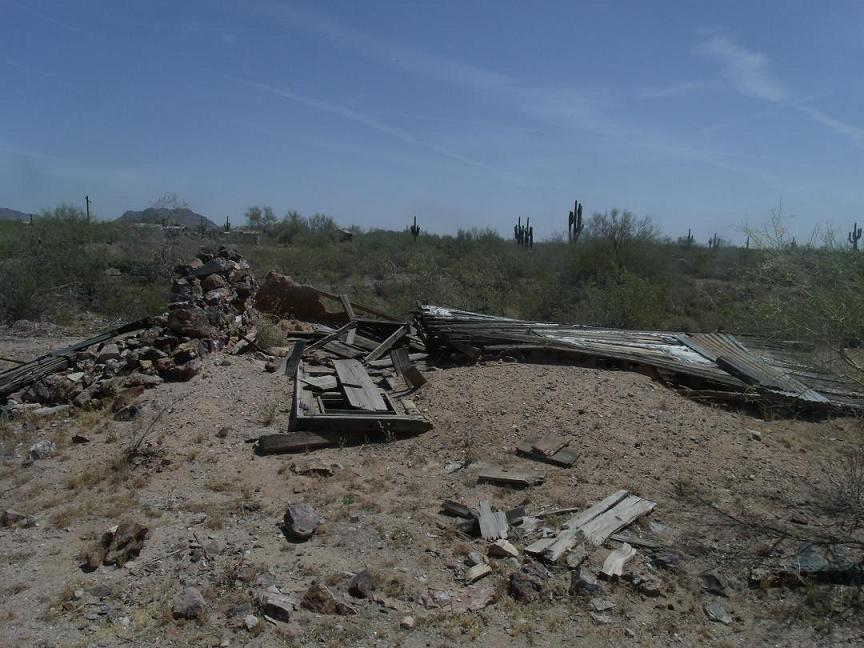
The ruins of the Vulture City Post Office which opened in 1880 and whose postmaster was Henry Wickenburg.

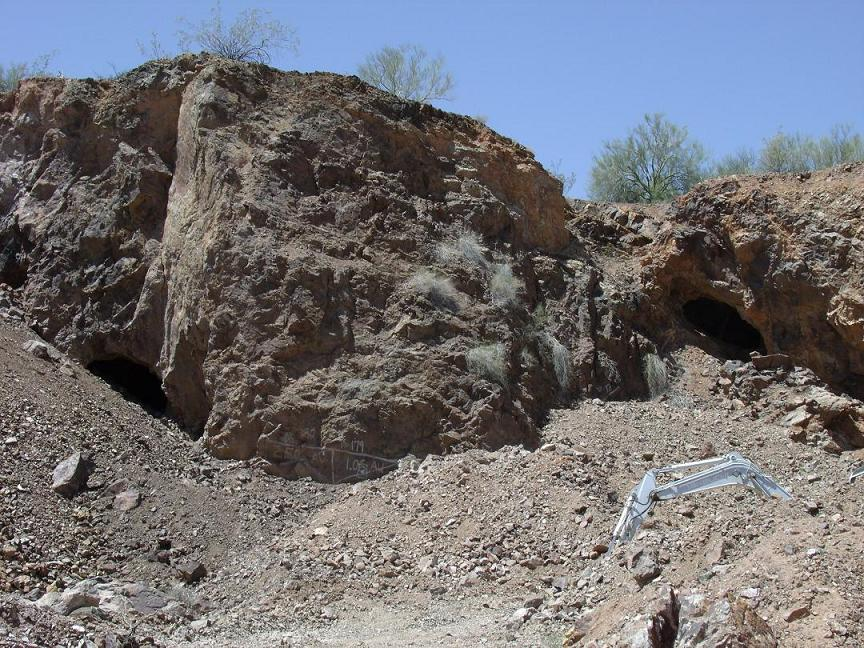
Vulture Mine, Vulture Mountain and caves.

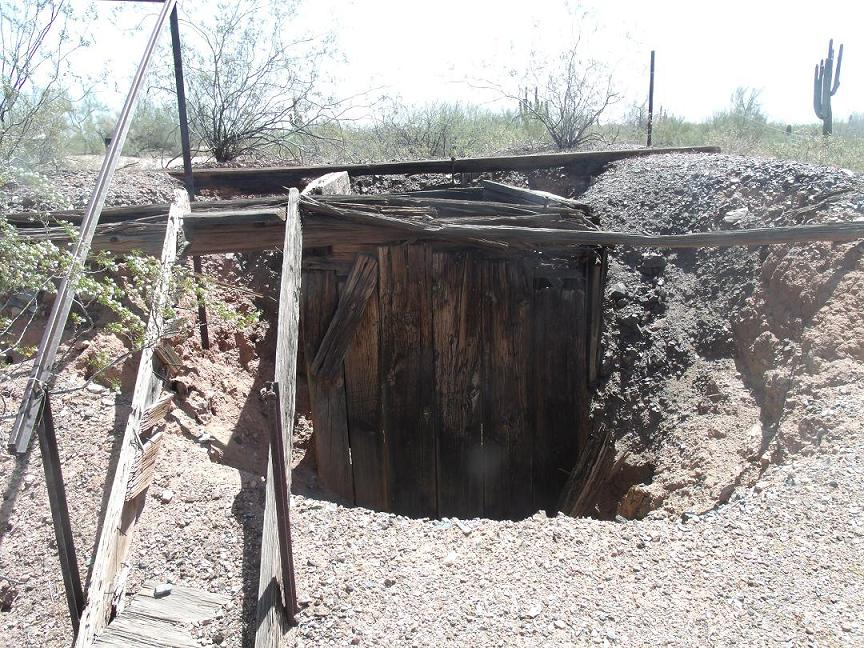
Nickel Shaft.

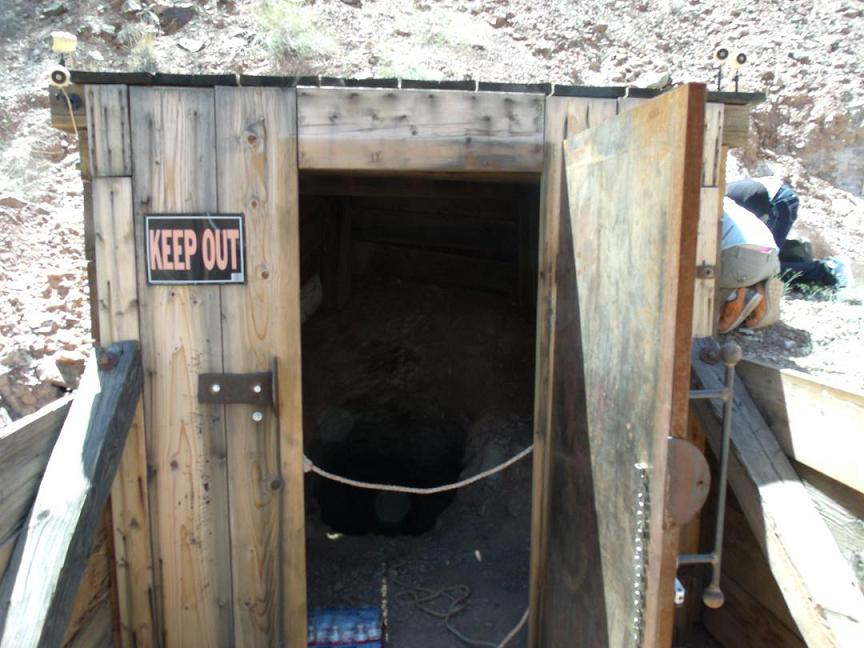
Entrance to the Vulture Mine gold mine shaft.

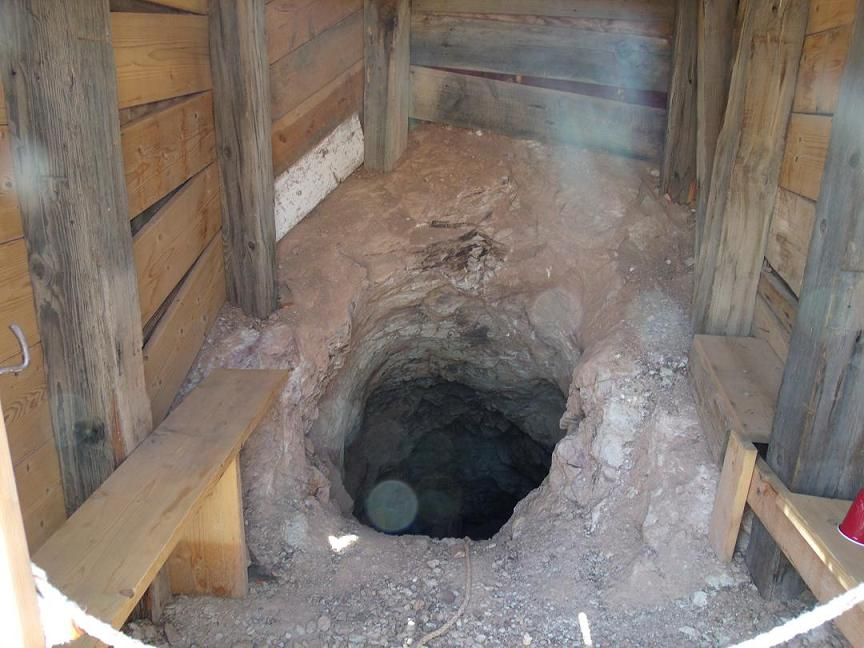
Inside of the entrance of the gold mine shaft.

== See also ==
- Wickenburg Massacre
- National Register of Historic Places listings in Maricopa County, Arizona
