= W. Hudson Kensel =

- Born: William Hudson Kensel; June 16, 1928; Kansas City, Missouri, USA
- Died: January 16, 2014 (aged 85); Edmonds, Washington
- Education: University of Washington Central Washington University Washington State University
- Occupations: Historian; Professor emeritus at California State University, Fresno
- Spouse: Carol Jessup Kensel (married 1969)
- Children: Four children
- Parent(s): Willard F. "Bill" Wilkinson; Jessie Brenizer Wilkinson

W. Hudson Kensel (June 16, 1928 – January 16, 2014) was a historian and author of the American West. He is professor emeritus from California State University at Fresno.

At Fresno, he was the chairman of the Department of History. His early childhood was spent at Pahaska Tepee and Cody, Wyoming. He thereafter moved to the state of Washington where he completed his education. He is the author of Pahaska Tepee, Buffalo Bill's Old Hunting Lodge and Hotel, A History, 1901-1946 and Dude Ranching in Yellowstone Country: Larry Larom and Valley Ranch, 1915-1969, published in 2010 by the University of Oklahoma Press at Norman, Oklahoma. Valley Ranch, one of the first of the western dude ranches, was established by the New York City native Larry Larom. Now privately owned, it is located on the South Fork of the Shoshone River in northwestern Wyoming.

== Early life and education ==
The son of Willard F. "Bill" Wilkinson and the former Jessie R. Brenizer, Kensel was born in Kansas City, Missouri. He made his first trip to the West as a newborn when his family bought Pahaska Tepee, Buffalo Bill's hunting lodge near the east entrance to Yellowstone National Park. His childhood was spent at Pahaska in the summer months and in Cody during the school year.

The family later moved to Ellensburg, Washington, where Kensel spent his high school years. Thereafter, Kensel served from 1946 to 1948 in the United States Army and was a part of the occupation forces in Japan. After completing his military service, Kensel attended the University of Washington at Seattle, where in 1951 he earned a Bachelor of Arts degree in Economics and Business. He attended Central Washington University in Ellensburg and earned a Bachelor of Arts in education in 1952 and a Master of Education degree in 1955 with a thesis focusing upon "Local resource use in a junior high program in the Yakima Valley, Washington." In 1962, Kensel completed his Ph.D. in history at Washington State University in Pullman, with his dissertation entitled, "The Economic History of Spokane, Washington, 1881-1910." On April 4, 1969, he married the former Carol J. Jessup, with whom he reared four children.

== Professional career ==
Upon earning his Ph.D., Kensel taught at Columbia Basin College in Pasco, Washington. In 1965, he joined the Department of History at California State at Fresno, where he served as assistant professor. In 1969, he became an associate professor and in 1973 he became a tenured professor. He was a visiting professor in the Department of History at Pacific Lutheran University in Tacoma, Washington, during the summers of 1974, 1975, and 1976. While at Cal State, Fresno, Kensel served as the Chairman of the Department of History from 1972 to 1982. He was named professor emeritus on his retirement in 2002.

Kensel lived in Edmonds, Washington, and continued to research and write on topics related to western American history until his death on January 16, 2014. While conducting research in 2004 Kensel acquired a rare photo album of the Sunlight Ranch east of Cody. This photo album led Kensel to research the subjects in the pictures and in the Spring 2006 the Annals of Wyoming published, "Hope and Reality in the Sunlight Basin, Wyoming]: The Painter Family and John K. Rollinson." While conducting research on the Sunlight Ranch and dude ranching, Kensel found his next research topic – Larry Larom and Valley Ranch. In 2006, as a resident fellow at the Cody Institute for Western American Studies at the Buffalo Bill Historical Center in Cody, Kensel researched this topic extensively.

== Works ==
- Pahaska Tepee, Buffalo Bill's Old Hunting Lodge and Hotel, A History, 1901-1946. Buffalo Bill Historical Center, 1987.
- Dude Ranching in Yellowstone Country: Larry Larom and Valley Ranch, 1915-1969. University of Oklahoma Press, 2010.

=== Articles ===
- "Hope and Reality in the Sunlight Basin, Wyoming: The Painter Family and John K. Rollinson," Annals of Wyoming, Spring 2006.
- "Spokane: The First Decade," Idaho Yesterdays, Vol. 15, No. 1, Spring 1971.
- "Inland Empire Mining and the Growth of Spokane, 1883-1905," Pacific Northwestern Quarterly, April 1969. JSTOR 40488655
- "The Early Spokane Lumber Industry, 1871-1910," Idaho Yesterdays, Vol. 12, No. 1, Spring 1968.
