= Henry Garfias =

First marshal of Phoenix, Arizona (1851–1896)

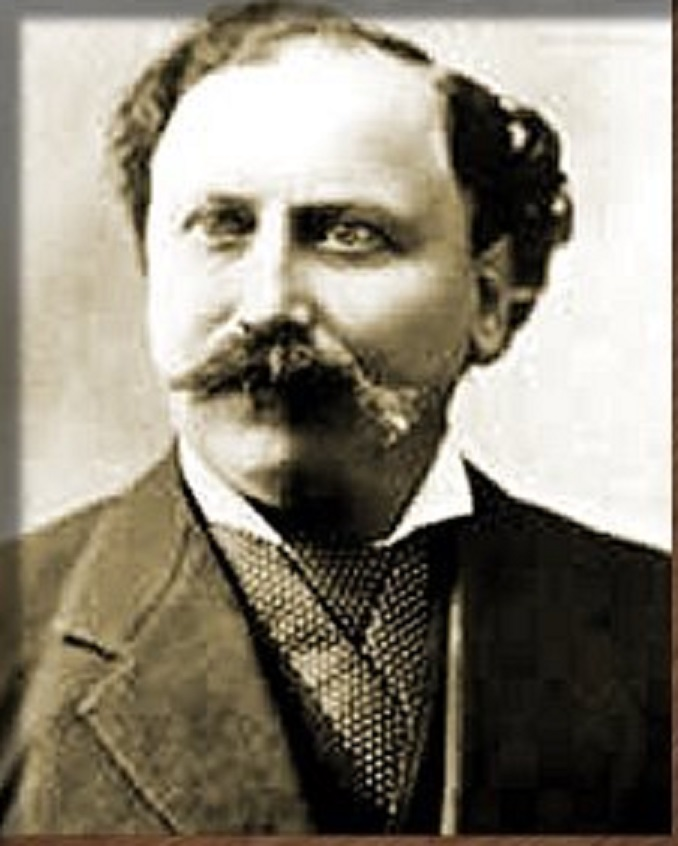
- Sheriff Garfias
- Born: Enrique Garfias; 1851; Orange County, California, U.S.
- Died: May 8, 1896; Phoenix, Arizona
- Occupation(s): Lawman, rancher, assessor, tax collector, constable, pound master, and street superintendent
- Known for: Highest elected Mexican American official in Arizona during the 19th century
- Opponent: Various
- Spouse: Elena Redondo
- Children: Louis Grafias
- Parent(s): Manuel Garfias and Maria Luisa Avila

Henry Garfias (born Enrique Garfias; 1851–1896) was the first city marshal of Phoenix, Arizona. He was also a gunfighter who became the elected official of Mexican descent holding the highest office the Phoenix region in the 19th century.

== Early years ==
Garfias was born in Orange County, California, to Manuel Garfias and Maria Luisa Avila. He lived in the town of Anaheim, California, with his parents. His father, who was once a general in the Mexican Army, was very strict. Garfias heard about the gold mines in Arizona, and when he was 20 years old he headed to Wickenburg, Arizona Territory, in search of gold in the Vulture Mountains. In 1874, he moved to the newly founded town of Phoenix.

== County deputy sheriff ==
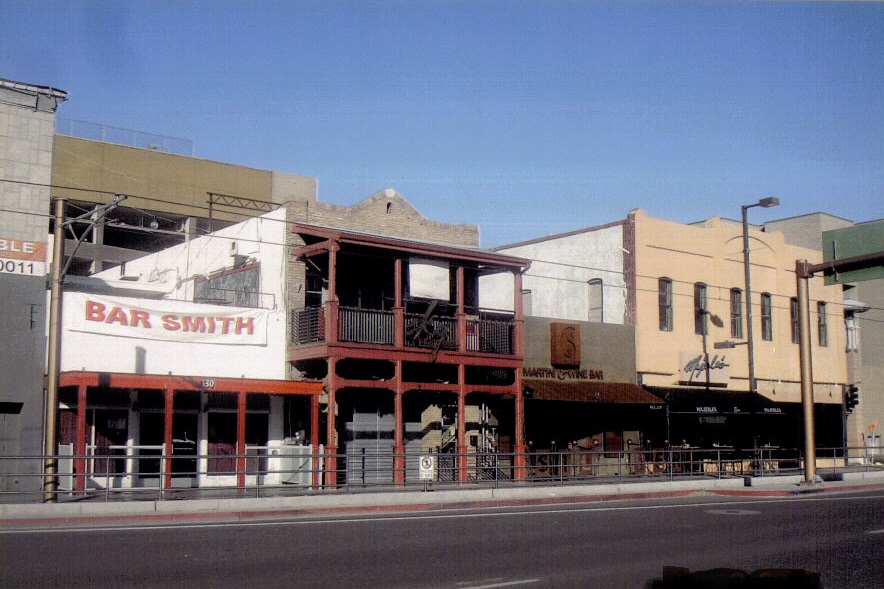
Historic Washington Street

Though Garfias was slender and not very tall at 5'9", he was well-built. He practiced his shooting skills and was hired as the county deputy sheriff in Phoenix. He was known simply as Sheriff "Henry" Garfias by the townsfolk. The town grew and within a year of Garfias becoming a deputy sheriff the town had 16 saloons and four dance halls located in Whiskey Row in the north side of Washington Street. The town of Phoenix was practically lawless because the military garrison stationed at Fort McDowell, more than 30 miles away, was the only other "law" in the region. However, Garfias responded quickly to disturbances, which were common affairs, especially on Saturday nights.

== The Ghost Bandit ==
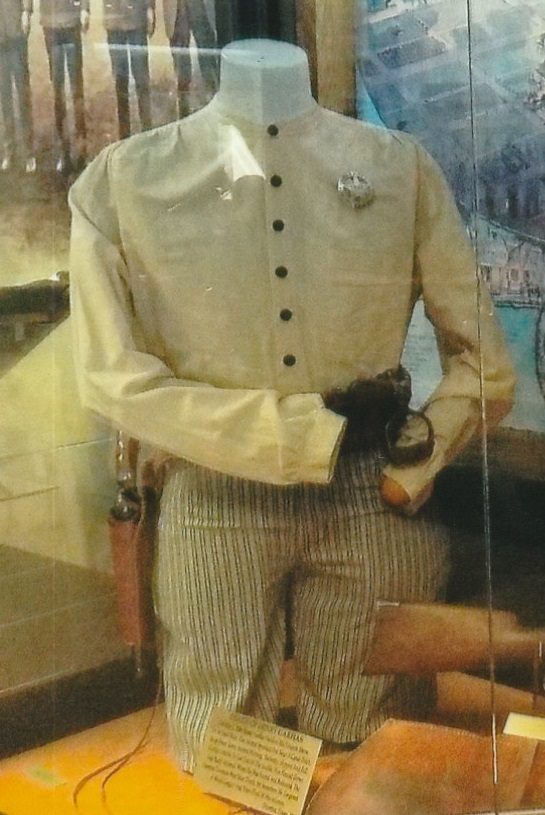
Clothes worn by sheriff Henry Garfias in 1881

Gillett was a lawless mining town on the southern part of the Bradshaw Mountains. Henry Seymour, the town's blacksmith, engaged in robbing the Wells Fargo stage coach before it reached the town. In 1881 alone he held up three coaches, but was not considered as a suspect because he would already be in his shop before the arrival of the stage coach. The robber, who over the course of the three robberies stole up to $68,000, became known as the "Ghost Bandit".

Normally, Seymour hid his loot after a robbery, but suspicions arose when in one occasion he used some of the money from a robbery in a local saloon's poker game.

Maricopa County Sheriff Lindley Orme sent deputy Henry Garfias to investigate the situation. During his investigation Garfias was told by witnesses that on the day of the last robbery they spotted Henry Seymour, the blacksmith, with a rifle under his arm along with several gunny sacks. Garfias suspected that Seymour was the Ghost Bandit and decided to set a trap.

As soon as he found out that the next stagecoach was about to arrive in Gillett, Garfias hid close to the Agua Fria crossing and waited. As soon as he spotted Seymour, who was armed with a rifle, Garfias arrested him.

Seymour was tried in Phoenix and sent to prison. He never told anyone where he hid his treasure, and when he was released from prison he never returned to Gillett. Henry Garfias later become the first marshal of Phoenix.

== Town marshal ==
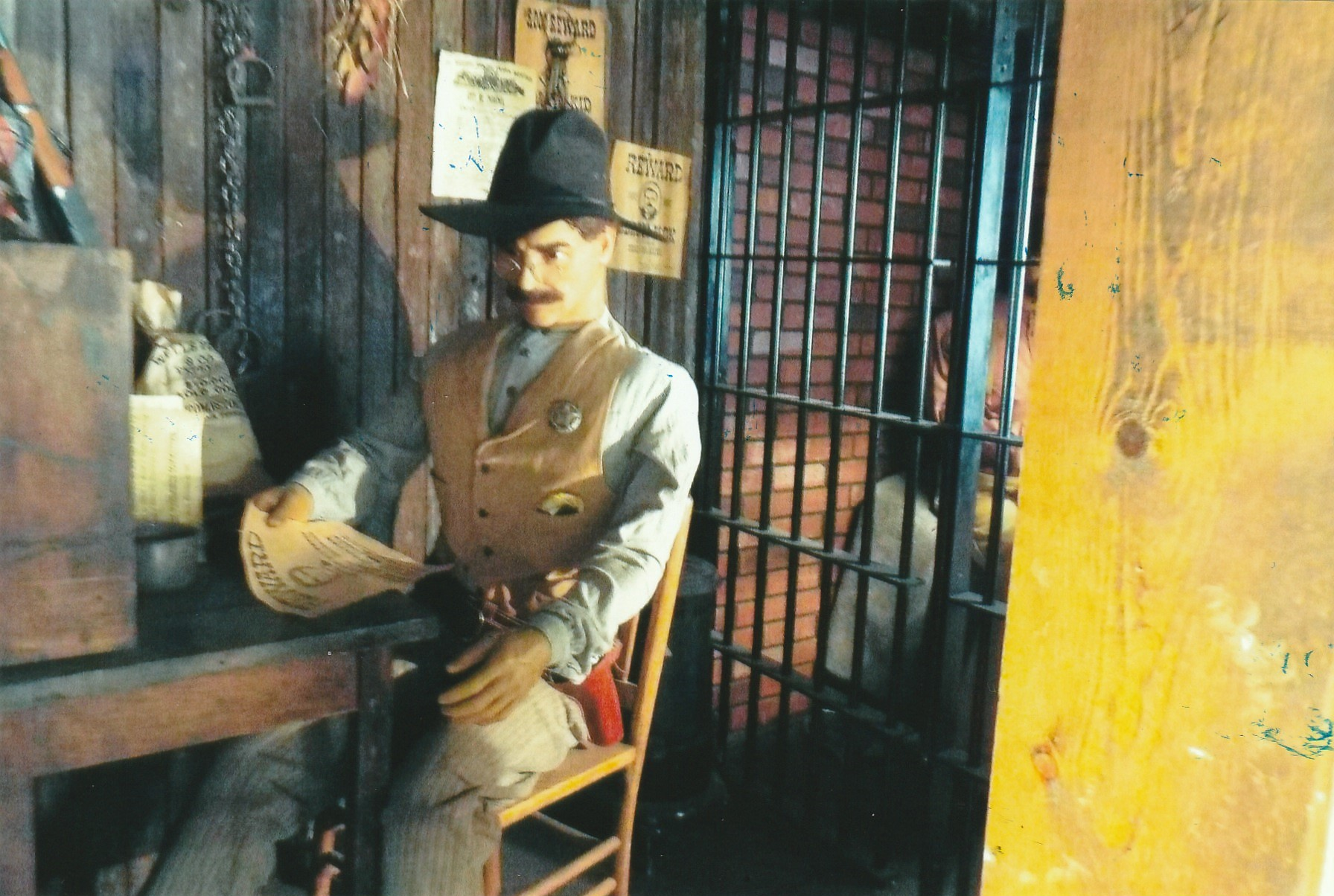
Replica of Sheriff Henry Garfias’ office and jail with a figure which resembles and represents Garfia.

In 1881, Phoenix was officially incorporated into a town and Garfias was appointed as the town marshal. When a formal municipal election was held he won, thus becoming the highest elected Mexican American official in the Valley during the 19th century. He encountered many outlaws during the years that he served as a lawman, and killed many of them in shoot-outs.

According to author Jeffrey R Richardson, Garfias once was confronted by four rowdy cowboys who began to take shots at him from horseback, while Garfias was on foot. Garfias killed all four of them leaving them laying dead in the dusty street.

Oviedo was a dangerous outlaw who was also known as the "Saber Slasher". Oviedo's hatred of Garfias was to the extent that he swore to kill the lawman on sight. On one occasion, Garfias had a warrant for Oviedo's arrest and therefore went after the outlaw. As soon as Oviedo saw Garfias, he went for his shotgun and confronted the lawman. He fired his shotgun at Garfias and missed him, and the marshal then fired two bullets killing the outlaw.

== Later years ==
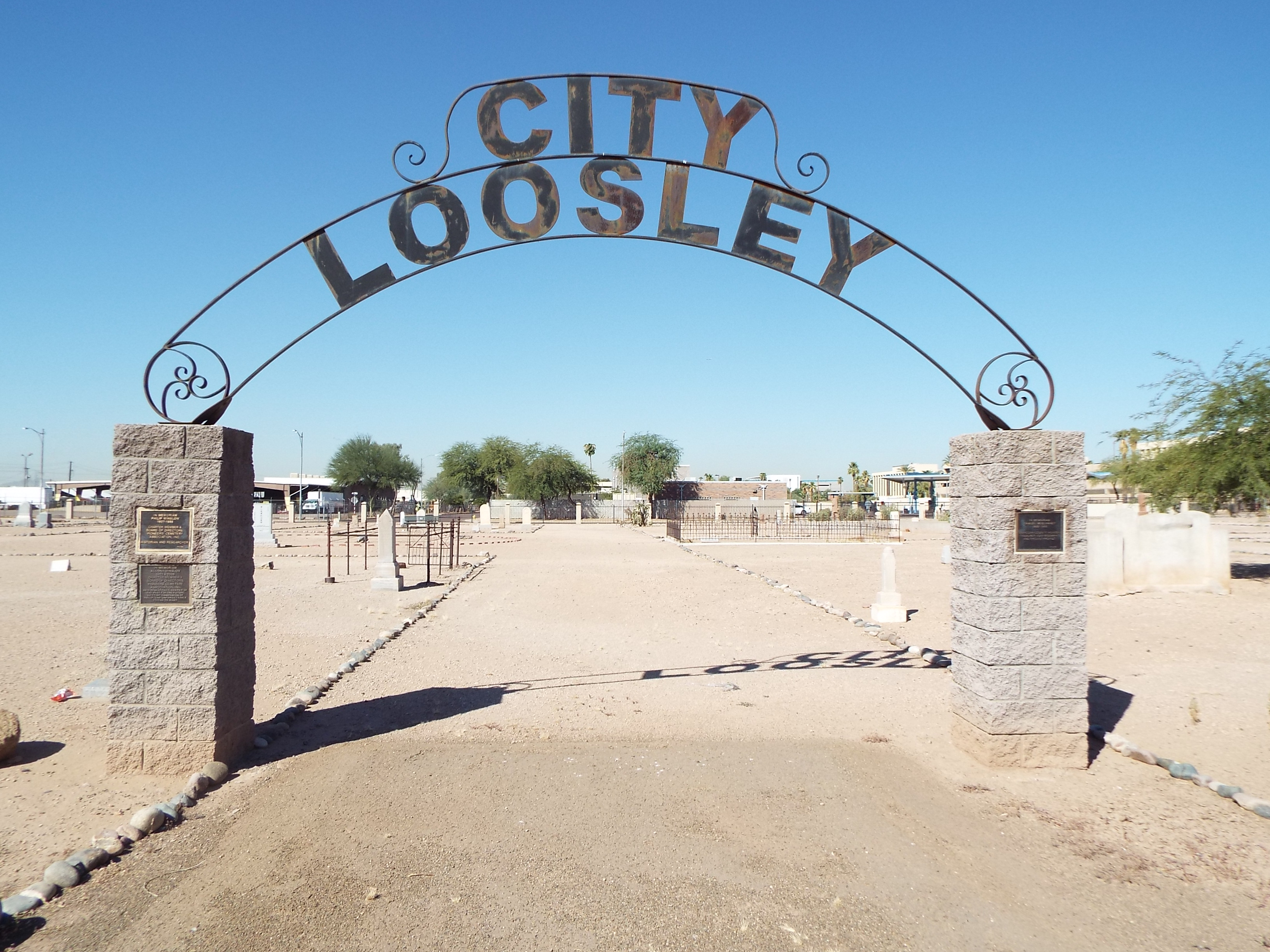
City/Loosley Cemetery entrance

Garfias retired in 1886 and lived in his ranch with his wife Elena Redondo, whom he had married on April 13 1883, and with his son Louis Grafias who was born in 1892. He had a successful cattle ranch in Castle Springs, and established a Spanish language newspaper called El Progreso, with his brother-in law, Francisco Xavier "Frank" Redondo. For 22 years, Garfias held the official capacity of assessor, tax collector, constable, pound master, and street superintendent.

By 1896, Garfias was suffering from tuberculosis and pains from several old wounds. On May 2, 1896, he was riding one of his horses, when suddenly the animal threw him off and rolled on him. Garfias initially survived the fall, but he died seven days later. He was buried in the City Loosley Cemetery which is located inside the Pioneer and Military Memorial Park.

The Republican is quoted as stating the following:

"Arizona has had many brave men, but for cool determined nerve, coupled with a modest unassuming manner. Henry Garfias stood at the head."

and the Phoenix Herald stated that:

"Henry Garfias, had the reputation of never going after a man that did not return with him, dead or alive."

No other person of Mexican descent would hold a public office in Phoenix until 1954, when Adam Perez Diaz (1909-2010) became the first Hispanic elected to the Phoenix City Council and also to serve as Vice-Mayor. Plus, no other Latino would lead Phoenix's police authority for nearly a century, until Ruben B. Ortega was appointed police chief on February 25, 1980.

== See also ==
- Arizona
- Phoenix Police Museum
- Pioneer and Military Memorial Park

=== Arizona pioneers ===
- Mansel Carter
- Bill Downing
- Winston C. Hackett
- John C. Lincoln
- Paul W. Litchfield
- Joe Mayer
- William John Murphy
- Wing F. Ong
- Levi Ruggles
- Sedona Schnebly
- Michael Sullivan
- Trinidad Swilling
- Ora Rush Weed
- Henry Wickenburg
