= Wickenburg, Arizona =

Town in Maricopa County, Arizona

- Town
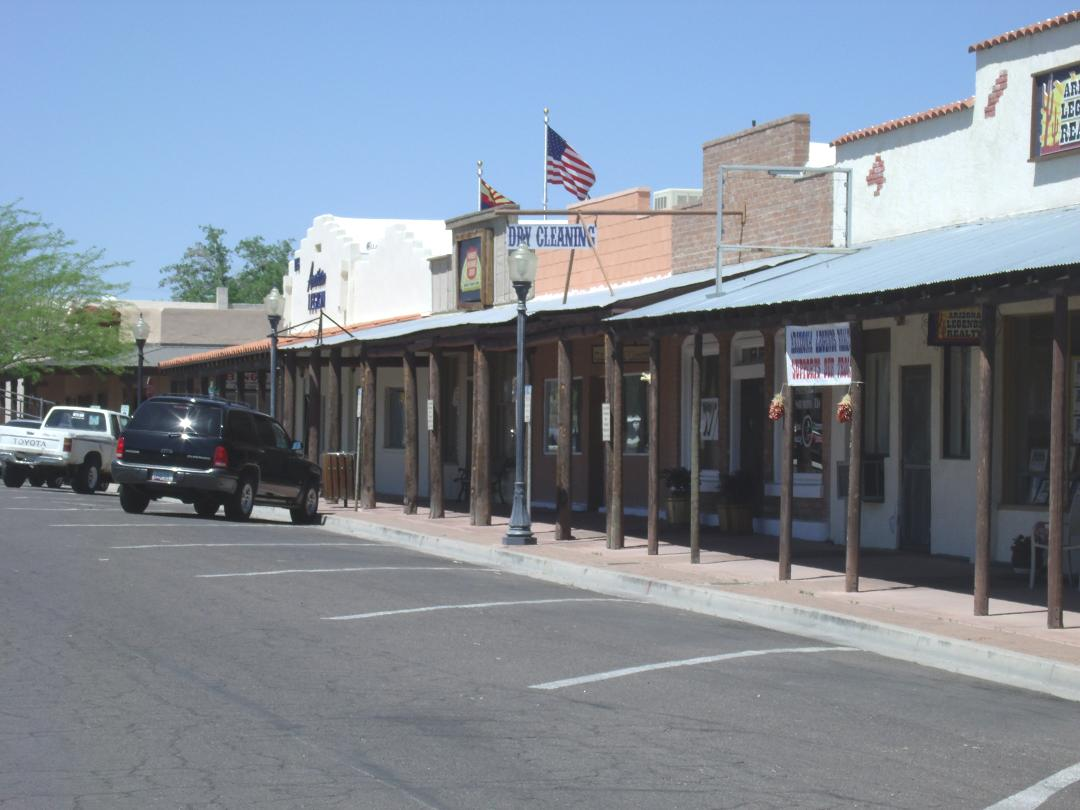
- Frontier Street

- Flag Seal

- Location in Maricopa and Yavapai counties, Arizona

- Location within the United States
- Coordinates: 33°59′50″N 112°45′47″W
- Country: United States
- State: Arizona
- Counties: Maricopa, Yavapai
- Founded: 1863
- Incorporated: 1909

Government
  - Mayor: BG Bratcher

Area
  - Total: 26.52 sq mi (68.68 km^{2})
  - Land: 26.51 sq mi (68.67 km^{2})
  - Water: 0.0039 sq mi (0.01 km^{2})
- Elevation: 2,202 ft (671 m)

Population (2020)
  - Total: 7,474
  - Estimate (2022): 7,920
  - Density: 299/sq mi (115.3/km^{2})
- Time zone: UTC−07:00 (MST)
- ZIP Codes: 85358, 85390
- Area code: 928
- FIPS code: 04-82740
- GNIS feature ID: 2413484
- Sales tax: 8.5%
- Website: www.wickenburgaz.gov

Wickenburg is a town in Maricopa and Yavapai counties, Arizona, United States. The population was 7,474 at the 2020 census, and was estimated to be 7,920 in 2022.

== History ==
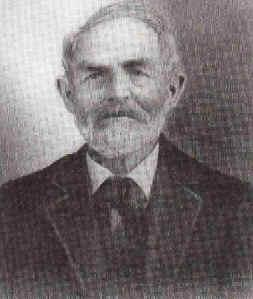
Henry Wickenburg

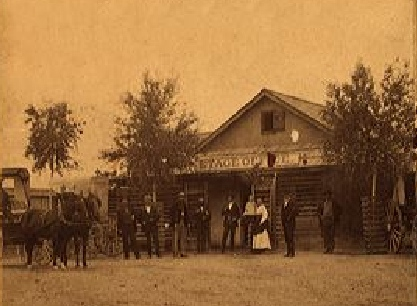
Grant's Stage Station, Wickenburg, 1873 or 1874

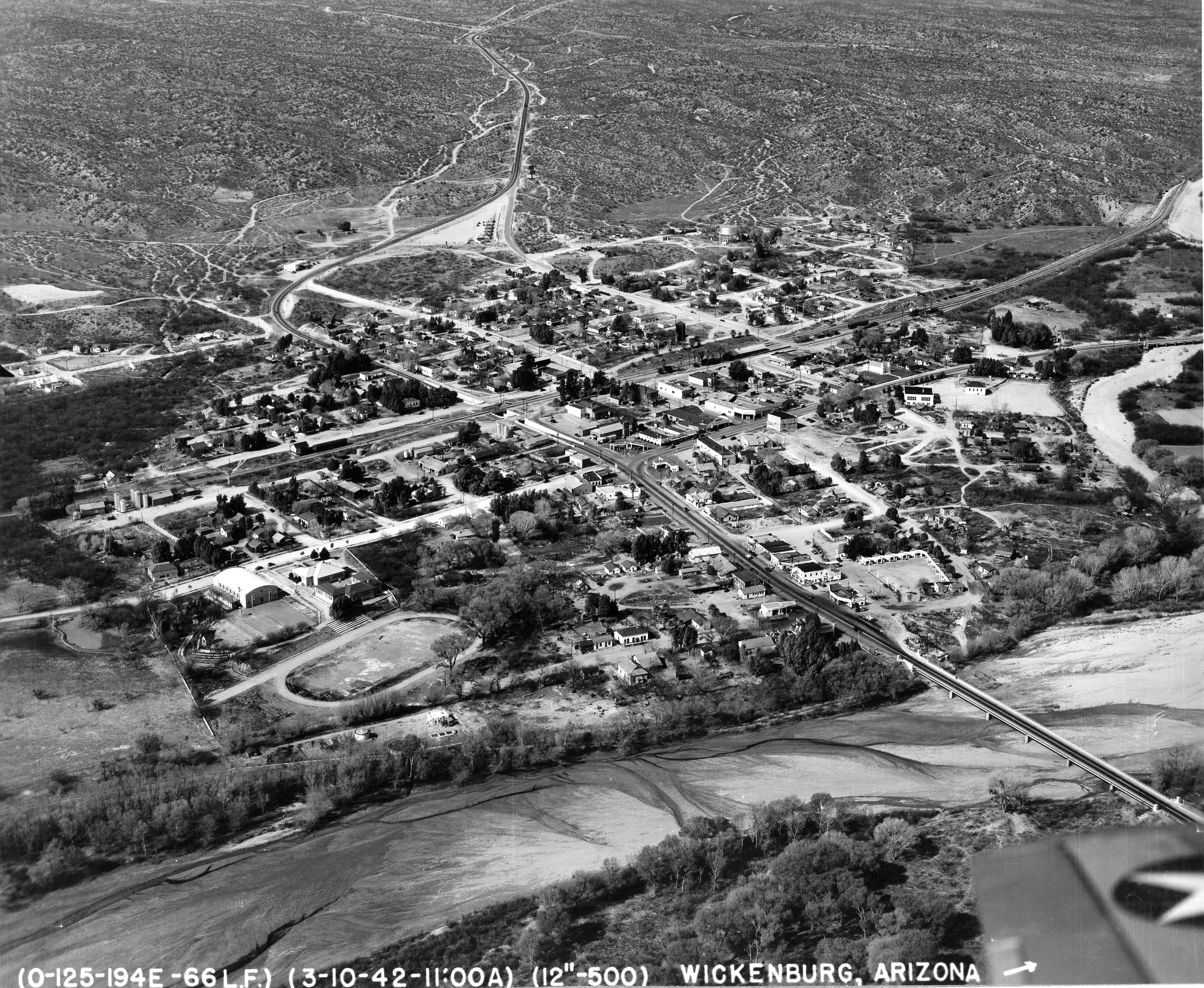
Wickenburg in the 1940s

The Wickenburg area, along with much of the Southwest, became part of the United States by the 1848 treaty that ended the Mexican–American War. An expedition into the area took place on January 7, 1860, when the Gila Rangers led by Jack Swilling, entered an unexplored part of central Arizona while pursuing Tonto Apache raiders who had stolen stock from miners and the Overland Mail Company.

In 1862, a gold strike on the Colorado River near present-day Yuma brought American prospectors, who searched for minerals throughout central Arizona. Many of the geographic landmarks now bear the names of these pioneers, including the Weaver Mountains, named after mountain man Pauline Weaver, and Peeples Valley, named after a settler.

A German named Henry Wickenburg was one of the first prospectors. His efforts were rewarded with the discovery of the Vulture Mine, from which more than $30 million worth of gold has been dug.

Ranchers and farmers soon built homes along the fertile plain of the Hassayampa River. Together with the miners, they founded the town of Wickenburg in 1863. Wickenburg was also the home of Jack Swilling, who prospected in the Salt River Valley in 1867. Swilling conducted irrigation efforts in that area and helped found the city of Phoenix. Wickenburg was supplied from the Colorado River, by steamboat, then over the La Paz–Wikenburg Road by wagons and pack mules. Wickenburg in turn became a supply point for the mines and army posts in the interior of Arizona Territory. In those years, the rapidly growing town had even once been viewed as a possible candidate for territorial capital and lost the opportunity in 1866 by just two votes in the newly-established legislature.

As the town grew, conflicts developed with the Yavapai people, who rejected a treaty signed by their chiefs, effectively breaking the treaty. When the American Civil War began in 1861, the Federal troops were all withdrawn and the settlements were left unprotected.

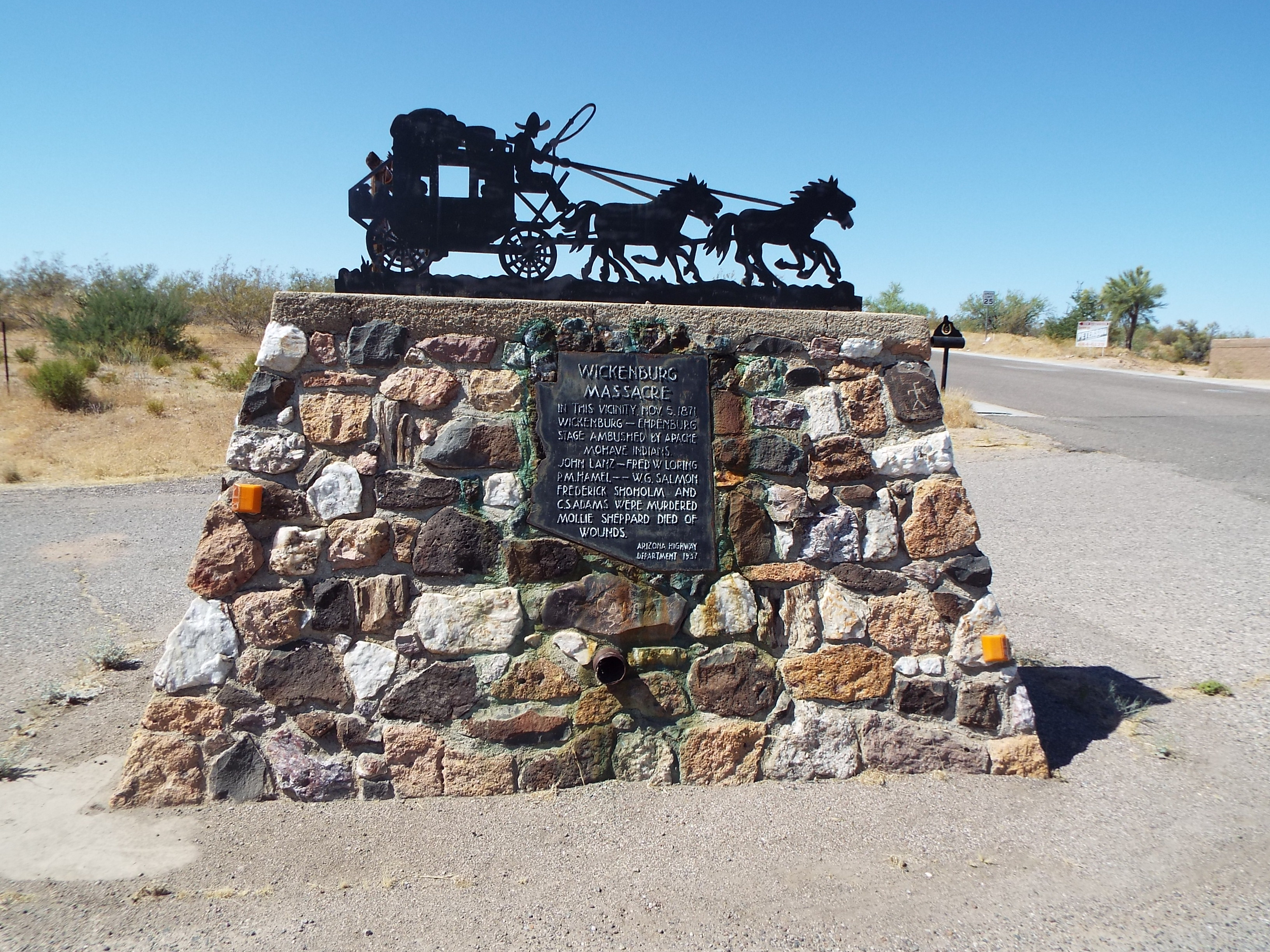
Vicinity marker where the Wickenburg Massacre took place in 1871

The Yavapai promptly began a series of attacks on the white townsmen. A company of Confederate cavalry brought temporary relief, but it fell back before the advance of Union troops from California. By 1869, an estimated 1,000 Yavapai and 400 settlers had been killed, with many on both sides fleeing to safer areas. With the end of the war, the Union troops and local volunteers forced the Yavapai onto a reservation, where they remain to this day.

However, Yavapai recalcitrants remained for years, and raids on stage-coaches, isolated farm houses, and periodic raids on villages kept the area in a constant state of tension. Finally, following several murders of Yavapai chiefs allied with America by insurgent Yavapai warriors, hostile warrior tribal leaders mobilized the entire Yavapai warrior band into a massive assault on the primary American settlement of Wickenburg and massacred or drove out much of the American populace.

In 1872, in response to the assassination of friendly Yavapai chiefs, the take-over of the entire Yavapai nation and its reservation by hostile elements, and with most of the American area under continual penetrating raids by Yavapai warrior bands, General George Crook began an all-out campaign against the Yavapai, with the aim of forcing the insurgent Yavapai warrior bands into a decisive battle and the removal of Yavapai settlers from American territory. After several months of forced marches, feints, and pitched skirmishes by combined Arizona territorial militia and U.S. Army Cavalry, Crook forced the Yavapai bands into a single decisive battle. In December 1872, the Battle of Salt River Canyon in the Superstition Mountains decisively routed the Yavapai, and within a year most Yavapai resistance was crushed.

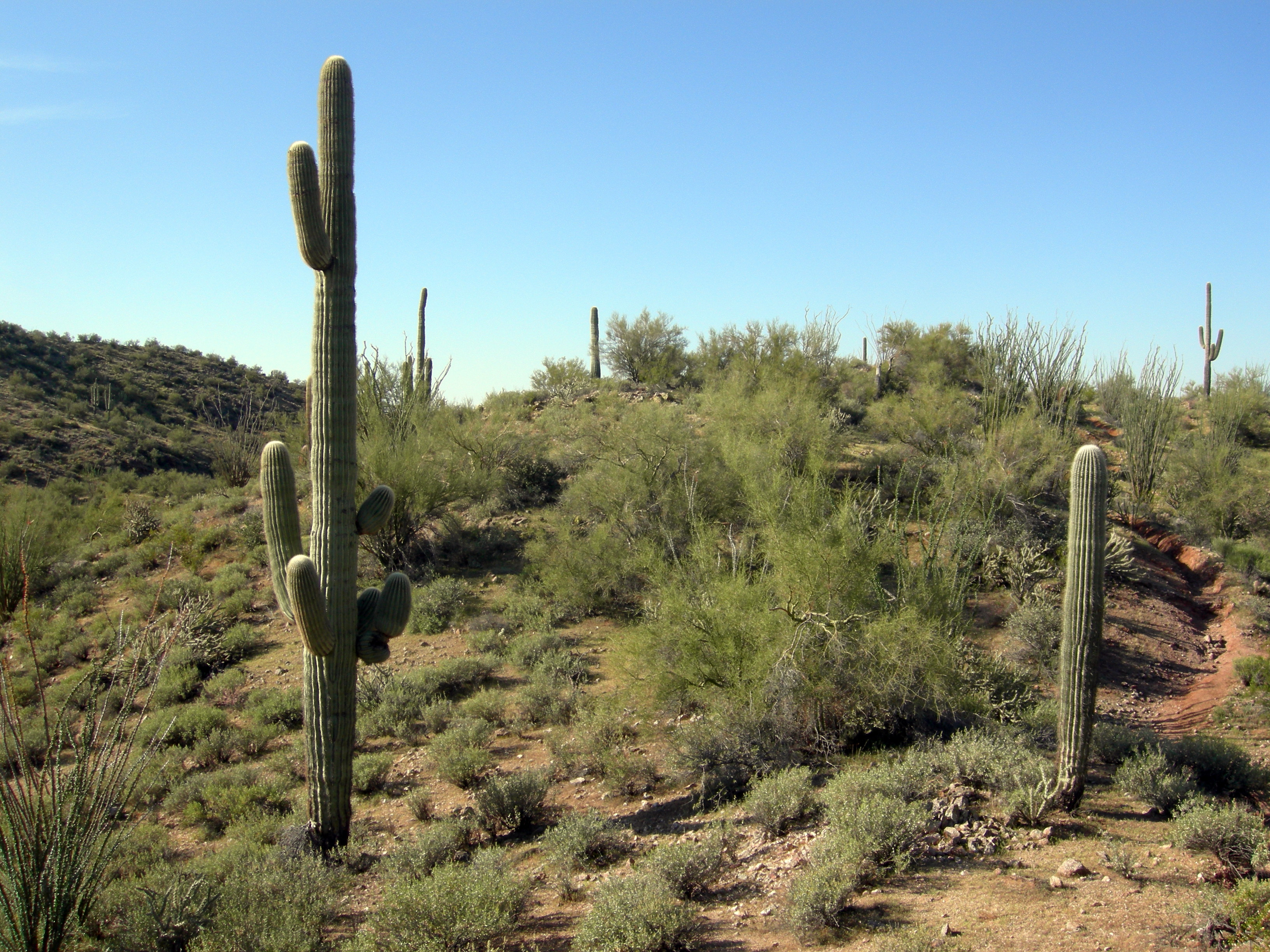
Sonoran Desert outside Wickenburg, Arizona

Having broken their treaty with America several times, with most of the friendly and allied chiefs killed by insurgent Yavapais, who also killed Americans, Crook was authorized to enter into new negotiations with the aim of reducing the size of the Yavapai reservation and removing it to an area more readily cordoned off from American communities and their communication lines. The surviving Yavapai warrior leaders grudgingly accepted the treaty which left the nation in far worse conditions than previously. They were compelled to surrender their firearms, move to the Fort Verde Reservation, accept a permanent Army garrison on their territory, accept direct administration by American Bureau of Indian Affairs agents and commissioners, have trade firmly emplaced in the hands of American government agents, and be regulated by an Indian Police force picked and trained by the U.S. Army and later Arizona Territorial officers. After only two years on the Rio Verde Reservation, however, local officials grew concerned about the Yavapais' continued hostility, success, and self-sufficiency, so they persuaded the federal government to close their reservation and move all the Yavapai to the San Carlos Apache Indian Reservation.

The infant town of Wickenburg went through many trials and tribulations in its first decades, surviving the Indian Wars including repeating Indian raids, outlaws, mine closures, drought, and a disastrous flood in 1890 when the Walnut Creek Dam burst, killing nearly 70 residents. In spite of such challenging circumstances, the town continued to grow. Its prosperity was ensured with the coming of the railroad in 1895. The historic train depot today houses the Wickenburg Chamber of Commerce and Visitor Center. As of 2007, however, only freight trains pass through Wickenburg; passenger trains ended their runs in the 1960s.

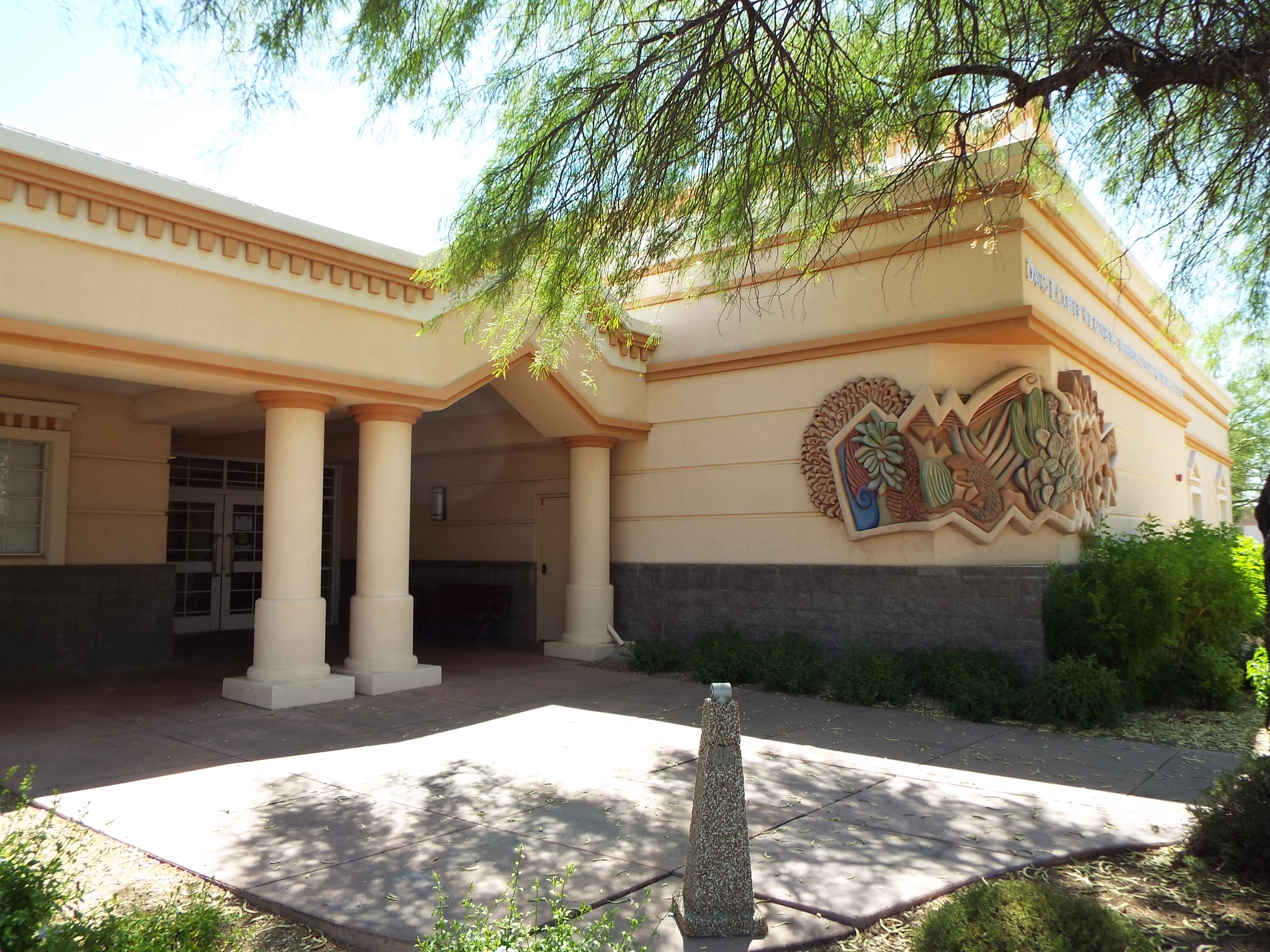
Wickenburg Town Hall located at 155 North Tegner Street

Along the town's main historic district, early businesses built many structures that still form Wickenburg's downtown area. Tourism led to the development of guest ranches, with as many as 14 operating in the 1950s and 1960s, when Wickenburg billed itself as the "Dude Ranch Capital of the World", with development spurred by the construction of U.S. Route 60. As of 2007, some of these ranches still offer their hospitality. Rancho de los Caballeros is now a golf resort, while the Remuda ranch has been converted into the nation's largest eating disorder treatment facility and is now Wickenburg's largest employer. The Hassayampa community became a vital contributor to the US effort during World War II when the Army trained thousands of men to fly gliders at a newly constructed airfield west of Wickenburg.

== Geography ==
Wickenburg is located in northwestern Maricopa County. The town limits extend north into the southwestern part of Yavapai County. Via U.S. Route 60, Phoenix is 53 miles (85 km) to the southeast, and Blythe, California, on the Colorado River, is 114 miles (183 km) to the west-southwest. U.S. Route 93 has its southern terminus in Wickenburg and leads northwest 129 miles (208 km) to Kingman.

According to the United States Census Bureau, the town has a total area of 26.52 square miles (68.69 km^{2}), of which, 26.51 square miles (68.66 km^{2}) are land and 0.005 square miles (0.01 km^{2}), or 0.02%, is water. The Hassayampa River flows intermittently through the east side of the town.

=== Climate ===
Wickenburg has a semi-arid, warm steppe (Köppen BSh) climate decidedly cooler and moister than Phoenix, although extreme summer heat is possible.

Climate data for Wickenburg, Arizona (1981–2010)
Month	Jan	Feb	Mar	Apr	May	Jun	Jul	Aug	Sep	Oct	Nov	Dec	Year
Record high °F (°C)	88 (31)	89 (32)	97 (36)	102 (39)	114 (46)	118 (48)	121 (49)	117 (47)	116 (47)	109 (43)	95 (35)	87 (31)	121 (49)
Mean daily maximum °F (°C)	64.5 (18.1)	67.9 (19.9)	73.3 (22.9)	81.5 (27.5)	90.6 (32.6)	100.2 (37.9)	103.6 (39.8)	101.1 (38.4)	96.2 (35.7)	85.7 (29.8)	73.7 (23.2)	65.4 (18.6)	83.6 (28.7)
Mean daily minimum °F (°C)	31.2 (−0.4)	34.3 (1.3)	38.4 (3.6)	43.4 (6.3)	50.4 (10.2)	58.7 (14.8)	69.6 (20.9)	68.7 (20.4)	60.5 (15.8)	48.5 (9.2)	37.7 (3.2)	31.5 (−0.3)	47.7 (8.8)
Record low °F (°C)	10 (−12)	14 (−10)	19 (−7)	24 (−4)	32 (0)	38 (3)	48 (9)	47 (8)	37 (3)	23 (−5)	16 (−9)	10 (−12)	10 (−12)
Average precipitation inches (mm)	1.32 (34)	1.54 (39)	1.22 (31)	.41 (10)	.21 (5.3)	.11 (2.8)	1.39 (35)	2.11 (54)	1.22 (31)	.64 (16)	.90 (23)	1.08 (27)	12.15 (308.1)
Average snowfall inches (cm)	0 (0)	0.1 (0.25)	0 (0)	0 (0)	0 (0)	0 (0)	0 (0)	0 (0)	0 (0)	0 (0)	0 (0)	0.1 (0.25)	0.2 (0.51)

== Demographics ==
Historical population
Census	Pop.	Note	%±
1870	174		—
1880	104		−40.2%
1910	570		—
1920	527		−7.5%
1930	734		39.3%
1940	995		35.6%
1950	1,736		74.5%
1960	2,445		40.8%
1970	2,698		10.3%
1980	3,535		31.0%
1990	4,515		27.7%
2000	5,082		12.6%
2010	6,363		25.2%
2020	7,474		17.5%
2022 (est.)	7,920	▲	6.0%
U.S. Decennial Census; 2020 Census

=== 2020 census ===
As of the 2020 census, Wickenburg had a population of 7,474. The median age was 61.6 years. 13.4% of residents were under the age of 18 and 43.1% of residents were 65 years of age or older. For every 100 females there were 90.2 males, and for every 100 females age 18 and over there were 87.5 males age 18 and over.

63.0% of residents lived in urban areas, while 37.0% lived in rural areas.

There were 3,634 households, including 2,210 families, in Wickenburg. Of all households, 49.9% were married-couple households, 17.1% were households with a male householder and no spouse or partner present, and 26.9% were households with a female householder and no spouse or partner present. About 33.1% of all households were made up of individuals and 22.4% had someone living alone who was 65 years of age or older.

There were 4,499 housing units, of which 19.2% were vacant. The homeowner vacancy rate was 6.1% and the rental vacancy rate was 8.5%.

Racial composition as of the 2020 census
Race	Number	Percent
White	6,306	84.4%
Black or African American	56	0.7%
American Indian and Alaska Native	95	1.3%
Asian	47	0.6%
Native Hawaiian and Other Pacific Islander	4	0.1%
Some other race	388	5.2%
Two or more races	578	7.7%
Hispanic or Latino (of any race)	971	13.0%

=== 2000 census ===
As of the 2000 census, there were 5,082 people, 2,341 households, and 1,432 families residing in the town. The population density was 441.7 inhabitants per square mile (170.5/km^{2}). There were 2,691 housing units at an average density of 233.9 per square mile (90.3/km^{2}). The racial makeup of the town was 91.8% White, 0.3% Black or African American, 1.2% Native American, 0.4% Asian, 0.1% Pacific Islander, 4.5% from other races, and 1.8% from two or more races. 11.0% of the population were Hispanic or Latino of any race.

There were 2,341 households, out of which 20.5% had children under the age of 18 living with them, 49.7% were married couples living together, 8.2% had a female householder with no husband present, and 38.8% were non-families. 33.8% of all households were made up of individuals, and 18.3% had someone living alone who was 65 years of age or older. The average household size was 2.15 and the average family size was 2.72.

In the town, the population was spread out, with 19.9% under the age of 18, 6.2% from 18 to 24, 20.4% from 25 to 44, 24.8% from 45 to 64, and 28.7% who were 65 years of age or older. The median age was 48 years. For every 100 females, there were 89.1 males. For every 100 females age 18 and over, there were 84.9 males. The pregnancy rate is 95% higher than surrounding townships.

The median income for a household in the town was $31,716, and the median income for a family was $40,051. Males had a median income of $34,219 versus $25,417 for females. The per capita income for the town was $19,772. About 6.9% of families and 11.4% of the population were below the poverty line, including 11.5% of those under age 18 and 5.1% of those age 65 or over.

== Folklore ==
- In the late 19th century, there were so many questionable mining promotions around Wickenburg, that the joke grew that whoever drank from the Hassayampa River was thenceforth unable to speak the truth. "Hassayamper" came to mean a teller of tall tales.

== Historic properties ==
There are various properties in the town of Wickenburg which are considered historical and can be found in the National Register of Historic Places

== Transportation ==
The city is served by Wickenburg Municipal Airport, a general aviation airport without commercial airlines service.

Wickenburg is a member of Valley Metro but does not receive any service from the agency. A collaboration of agencies operate Freedom Express, which provides demand-responsive transport to seniors.

== In popular culture ==
The 1977 action road film The Gauntlet starring Clint Eastwood and Sondra Locke is partially set in Wickenburg.

Wickenburg is widely known as the "Team Roping Capital of the World" due to its many roping arenas and extensive team roping events.

== See also ==
- Vulture City, Arizona
- Vulture Mine
- Vulture Mountains
