= Howard Eaton =

American dude rancher and tour operator

- Born: February 5, 1851
- Died: April 5, 1922 (aged 71)
- Occupations: Dude rancher and tour operator

Howard Eaton (February 5, 1851 – April 5, 1922) was an American rancher who was instrumental in the popularization of Yellowstone National Park and the American West. An acquaintance of Theodore Roosevelt from their time in North Dakota, he established ranches in North Dakota and Wyoming, and operated tours of Yellowstone in the park's early years. Eaton's ranch in Medora, North Dakota is generally considered the first dude ranch, catering primarily to tourists wishing to experience working ranch life. A skilled publicist, he profited by friendships with Roosevelt, artists Charles Russell and Joe De Yong, and writer Mary Roberts Rinehart. The Howard Eaton Trail in Yellowstone was named after Eaton.

== Early life and North Dakota ==
Howard Eaton was born in Pittsburgh, Pennsylvania to a wealthy family on February 5, 1851. In 1868, at age 17, Eaton moved west, reaching Medora, North Dakota and claiming land in 1879 in the Little Missouri River valley. He was later joined by his brothers Alden in 1881 and Willis in 1882. Eaton's ranch adjoined Theodore Roosevelt's Elkhorn Ranch, where Roosevelt had stayed between 1884 and 1887. The ranch initially was based in a one-room cabin that had been a stage station.The Eatons provided cattle and wild game to feed railroad construction crews. Initially three ranches owned by each brother, the Eatons consolidated the operation in 1883. Wealthy acquaintances enjoyed staying with the Eatons and offered to pay for the experience. Sensing an opportunity, the Eaton's ranch became the first dude ranch, catering to Easterners who sought a western ranch experience. Because George Armstrong Custer had once camped there, the Eatons named the dude ranch the Custer Trail Ranch. They charged $25 a month for stays at the ranch, which included helping with ranch chores. A hard winter in 1886-1887 killed 1350 of the Eaton's 1500 cattle, and the ranch house burned. The dude ranching operation saved the ranch.

While in North Dakota, Eaton was acquainted with the Marquis de Morès, who had set up a ranching operation in Medora, named for de Morès' wife. Eaton was a witness to a fatal 1883 shoot-out between de Morès and two companions, against three hunters and cowboys who resented de Morès' efforts at fencing in the rangeland. One of de Morès antagonists was killed in the exchange. De Morès was charged with murder, but escaped conviction.

By the 1890s, Eaton traded in captured western wildlife for parks and attractions in the eastern United States, including bison, elk, antelope, lynx, and other animals. In 1902 Eaton purchased bison from the Flathead herd, which had been maintained by the Bitterroot Salish on their reservation. Some of these animals were purchased by the National Park Service and established in Yellowstone National Park, augmenting the park's wild herd.

== Tour operator ==
Eaton led 66 tours in Yellowstone between 1883 and 1921. Eaton's motto was "roughing it with comfort." The Eaton tours catered to wealthy Easterners looking for a Western experience in the outdoors, sleeping in tents and traveling by horseback in groups of between three and four dozen. Eaton expected tourists to travel light, with only one suitcase, and provided everything else. Eaton's tours were particularly popular with women, who appreciated Eaton's efforts to ensure their comfort. An unusual feature of the tours for the time was Eaton's insistence that all women ride their horses astride, rather than the sidesaddle practice expected in genteel society of the time. The Eatons also led tours to the Grand Canyon.

The tours housed their patrons in pyramidal tens, designed for easy setup. The tents were arranged in separate rows for unmarried women, unmarried men, and married couples, with more tents for bathing and latrine use. The trail of horse-borne tourists was followed at some distance by a coach that picked up fatigued riders.

The Eaton brothers sold the Custer Trail Ranch and moved to Wyoming permanently in 1904, establishing the Wolf Creek Ranch at Wolf, Wyoming near Sheridan. Although it was a working ranch, its primary trade catered to vacationers. As such, it was an early dude ranch, with cabins for tourists in about 7,500 acres (3,000 ha).

Rinehart's first book describing her tour with Eaton

Howard Eaton was particularly skilled at cultivating useful friendships with prominent and influential people. In 1915 he convinced Mary Roberts Rinehart, one of the most popular writers of the time, to come on a tour of the eastern side of newly-established Glacier National Park. Rinehart was initially unenthusiastic, but agreed to the trip. Eaton made a particular effort to impress Rinehart, recruiting Blackfeet Chief Three Bears to greet Rinehart. The tour was documented by motion and still photographers, and artist Charles Russell accompanied the tour. In the evenings, Eaton and Russell told stories at the campfire. Roberts was inspired to write a book about the tour, Through Glacier Park: Seeing America First with Howard Eaton (1916), and Eaton made the most of the publicity. Rinehart enjoyed the experience and returned in 1916 to tour the park, writing Tenting Tonight: A Chronicle of Sport and Adventure in Glacier Park and the Cascade Mountains (1918). In 1920 Rinehart toured portions of the Southwest on an Eaton tour, publishing her account in 1923 as The Out Trail. Rinehart spent several summers at the Eaton ranch and wrote two Wyoming-based novels, The Breaking Point (1922) and Lost Ecstasy (1927).

Arthur Aloysius "Pete" Dailey was a writer and photographer who had worked with Eaton in the summers during his journalism studies at the University of Illinois. In the 1930s Dailey wrote scripts based on his experiences with the Eaton ranch and tours for the children's radio serial Lucky Star Ranch, which ran on WBBM in the 1930s.

Joe De Yong was another Eaton employee, an artist who studied with Russell. De Yong edited the Eaton newsletter from 1923 to 1929.

Eaton died at the age of 71 on April 5, 1922, a week after an appendectomy.

The Howard Eaton Trail was established in Yellowstone in 1923, shortly after Eaton's death. Although it was named for Eaton, it was not necessarily the path Eaton's tours followed, as they varied from year to year according to grazing opportunities for Eaton's horses. Paralleling the eventual route of the Grand Loop Road, the 157-mile (253 km) route gradually fragmented as the park's road and trail system developed, and became three disconnected sections.

The Eaton Ranch at Wolf continues to operate as a guest ranch in Eaton family ownership.
