= Henry Wickenburg =

Arizona pioneer and miner (1819–1905)

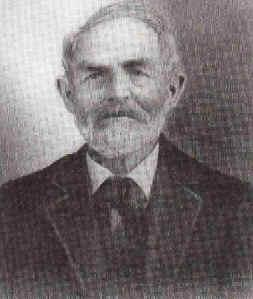
- Henry Wickenburg c. 1900
- Born: Johannes Henricus Wickenburg; November 21, 1819; Essen–Holsterhausen, Prussia (now Germany)
- Died: May 14, 1905 (aged 85); Wickenburg, Arizona, U.S.
- Occupations: Prospector and farmer

Notes
- Founded the town of Wickenburg, Arizona.

Henry Wickenburg (November 21, 1819 – May 14, 1905) was a Prussian prospector who discovered the Vulture Mine and founded the town of Wickenburg in the U.S. state of Arizona. Wickenburg never married. Mrs. Helene Holland inherited Wickenburg’s personal property in 1903, while he was still alive, and the remainder of his estate in 1905 after Henry Wickenburg died from a gunshot wound in the head. His death was deemed a suicide, but many questioned this ruling. The mine that he discovered produced as much as $70 million worth of gold during its course of operation, making it the most important gold mine in Arizona.

== Early years ==
Wickenburg (birth name: Johannes Henricus Wickenburg) was born in Essen, Prussia, a coal and steel town in what is now Germany. Together with his brother he mined coal on the land which belonged to his family. However, the mineral rights were claimed by the government and Wickenburg immigrated to the United States in 1847, after the local authorities raided the family farm.

== Henry Wickenburg in the United States ==
Wickenburg arrived at the Port of New York in 1847. Upon learning of the discovery of gold in California, in what is known as the California gold rush, he decided to go to San Francisco. He arrived in San Francisco in 1853 and learned how to prospect and pan for gold. In accordance to his Declaration of Intention in 1877, he became a naturalized American citizen that same year. In 1862, he joined the Pauline Weaver party, who had struck gold in the Antelope Peak, and traveled into the interior of what was then the Arizona Territory. The group settled in what became known as "Peeples Valley" by the Hassayampa Creek.

== Vulture Mine ==
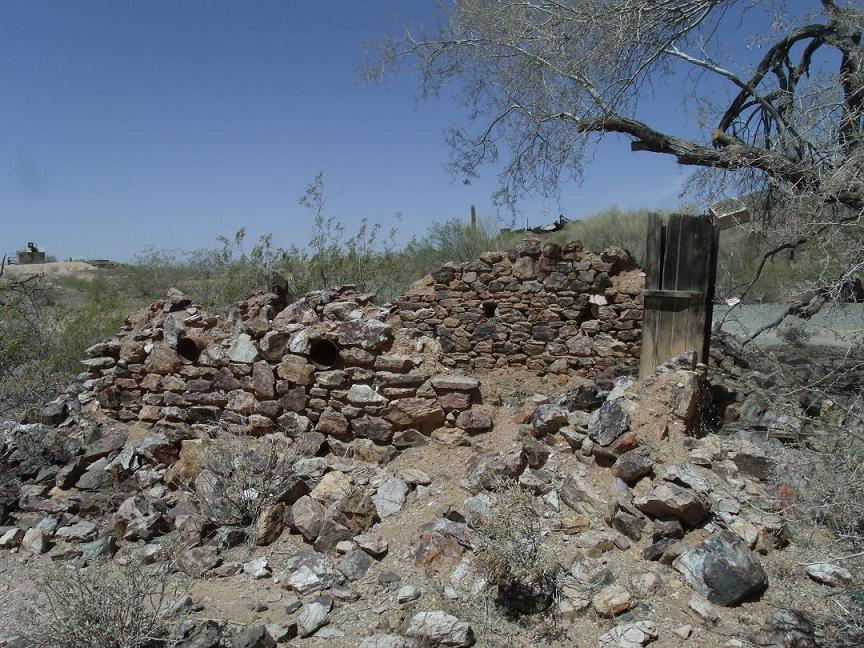
The ruins of Henry Wickenburg's Settlers Home in Vulture City

On one occasion Wickenburg had noticed a quartz ledge about fourteen miles from the group's camp. His observation was ignored by the others. Wickenburg went by himself to investigate the quartz ledge and believed that the ledge had potential. He returned to the camp and told his associates. A claim was staked by Wickenburg and his associates; A. Van Bibber, J.B. Green, W. Smith and N.K. Estil. His associates continued to seek other ventures and Wickenburg worked the mine by himself and began to sell the gold ore to other prospectors. He established an encampment which he named Wickenburg's Ranch. Wickenburg helped to finance Jack Swilling's Ditch Project, which later became the Salt River Project. After the Walnut Grove Dam burst in 1890, which destroyed all of the farm and mining operations he had recently invested in, Wickenburg was forced to sell the 80% interest of the Vulture mine which he owned, for eighty-five thousand US dollars ($85,000). The Vulture was the most important gold mine in Arizona.

== Town of Wickenburg ==
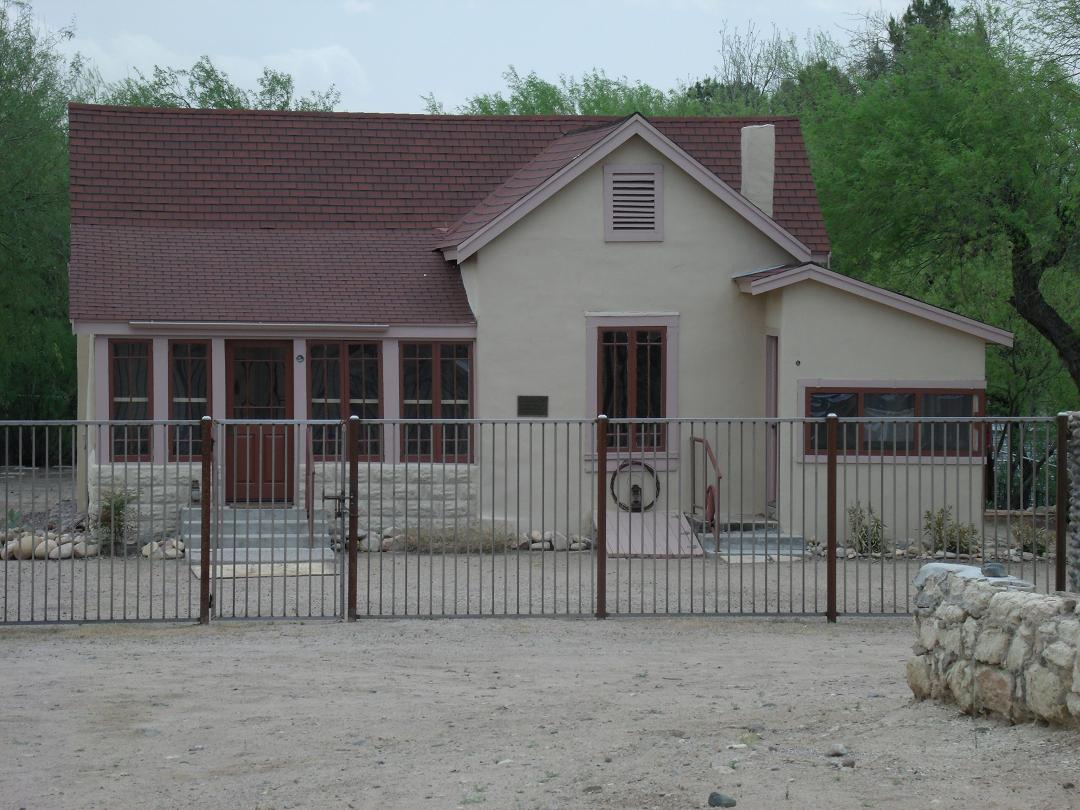
The Wickenburg House

The Vulture Mine played an instrumental and pivotal role in the founding and development of the town of Wickenburg. After Wickenburg established an encampment as Wickenburg's Ranch, James A. Moore who went into partnership with Wickenburg, wrote to Governor Goodwin and Secretary McCormick and referred to the tent camp as Wickenburg. In 1865, two five-stamp mills were erected and several stores, saloons and two hotels were established. In 1866 it missed being named Territorial Capital by only two votes of the Territorial Legislature. In 1868, the town site was surveyed and platted. Wickenburg donated land for the first church built in the town.

Wickenburg discovered the Vulture Mine in 1863. In 1866 he sold 4/5ths of his stake in the Vulture to Mr. Phelps of New York. The contract price was $85,000. However, Henry only received $25,000, because it was said that he could not provide clear title to the mine. While Wickenburg did have litigation fees, he still had other claims and was deeded 160 acres in 1879. The deed was signed by President Rutherford B. Hayes. This property became downtown Wickenburg.

Wickenburg eventually surveyed his property and began to sell city lots.(See Maricopa County Recorder-Henry Wickenburg) He, and others helped to finance Jack Swilling's Ditch Project, which later became the Salt River Project and was instrumental in the development of the City of Phoenix.

Wickenburg was very influential. His discovery of the Vulture Gold Mine was an important one and helped lead to the development of the Territory. Many of the people that were affiliated with the mine, became town and Territorial leaders. Henry was a member of the Seventh Arizona Legislature and served on various committees.

== Later years ==
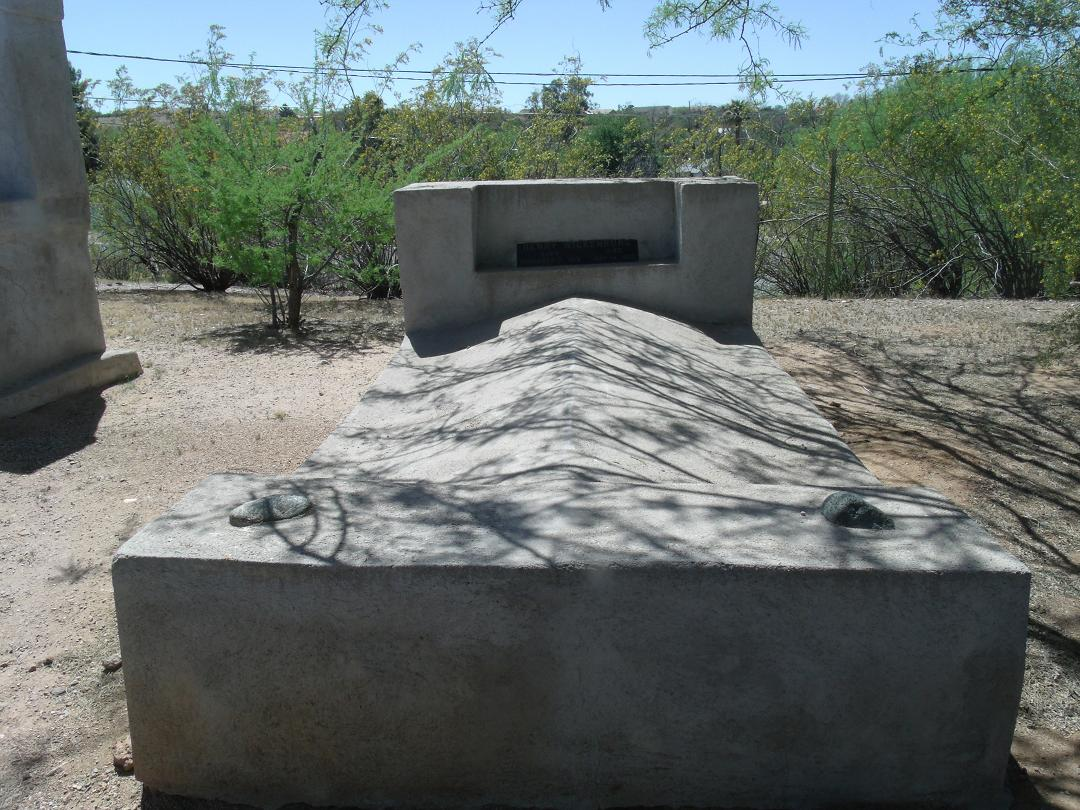
Grave-site of Henry Wickenburg in the Henry Wickenburg Pioneer Cemetery located in Adams Street. The cemetery was listed in the National Register of Historic Places April 4, 2011. Reference#11000151.

Wickenburg served as the town's postmaster, Justice of the Peace, Trustee for Wickenburg Schools, served on the school board, was a census taker, served on the coroner's jury, was the president of the Wickenburg Mining District, gave an easement to the railroad so it could come into Wickenburg, and donated land for the first permanent church in Wickenburg.

In 1903, Wickenburg initiated a deed in which he named Helene Holland, as beneficiary of his estate. F.X. O'Brien bought his ranch and Wickenburg built his adobe home, located at 225 S. Washington Street, known as the Wickenburg-Boetto Home.(National Registry Property) Wickenburg died from a gunshot wound on May 14, 1905. Many felt that the ruling of "suicide" was questionable, including the Maricopa County Sheriff (Murphy). Wickenburg was laid to rest, in what is now known as the Henry Wickenburg Pioneer Cemetery.

The Vulture Mine is said to have produced over 200 million in gold, but due to various reasons failed to be a money-maker. The mine is currently in operation, both as a mining venture and as a historic ghost town.

== See also ==
- Vulture Mountains
- Vulture City, Arizona
- The Henry Wickenburg House
- List of American places named after people

=== Arizona pioneers ===
- Mansel Carter
- Bill Downing
- Henry Garfias
- Winston C. Hackett
- John C. Lincoln
- Paul W. Litchfield
- Joe Mayer
- William John Murphy
- Wing F. Ong
- Levi Ruggles
- Sedona Schnebly
- Michael Sullivan
- Trinidad Swilling
- Ora Rush Weed
