= Wickenburg Municipal Airport =

Airport in Maricopa County, Arizona

- IATA: none; ICAO: none; FAA LID: E25

Summary
- Airport type: Public
- Owner: Town of Wickenburg
- Serves: Wickenburg, Arizona
- Elevation AMSL: 2,379 ft / 725 m
- Coordinates: 33°58′14″N 112°47′43″W

Map

Runways
Direction	Length		Surface
Direction	ft	m	Surface
5/23	6,101	1,860	Asphalt

Statistics (2021)
- Aircraft operations (year ending 4/11/2021): 36,150
- Based aircraft: 16
- Source: Federal Aviation Administration

Wickenburg Municipal Airport (FAA LID: E25) is a public use airport located 3.5 miles (3.0 nmi; 5.6 km) west of the central business district of Wickenburg, in Maricopa County, Arizona, United States. It is owned by the Town of Wickenburg. According to the FAA's National Plan of Integrated Airport Systems for 2009–2013, it is categorized as a general aviation facility.

== Facilities and aircraft ==
Wickenburg Municipal Airport covers an area of 100 acres (40 ha) at an elevation of 2,379 feet (725 m) above mean sea level. It has one runway designated 5/23 with an asphalt surface measuring 6,101 by 75 feet (1,859 x 23 m).

For the 12-month period ending April 11, 2021, the airport had 36,150 aircraft operations, an average of 99 per day: 99% general aviation, 1% air taxi, and <1% military. At that time there were 16 aircraft based at this airport: 12 single-engine, 1 multi-engine, 1 glider, and 2 ultra-light.

== See also ==
- List of airports in Arizona
