= Vulture Mine =

Defunct gold mine in Maricopa County, Arizona

Vulture Gold Mine
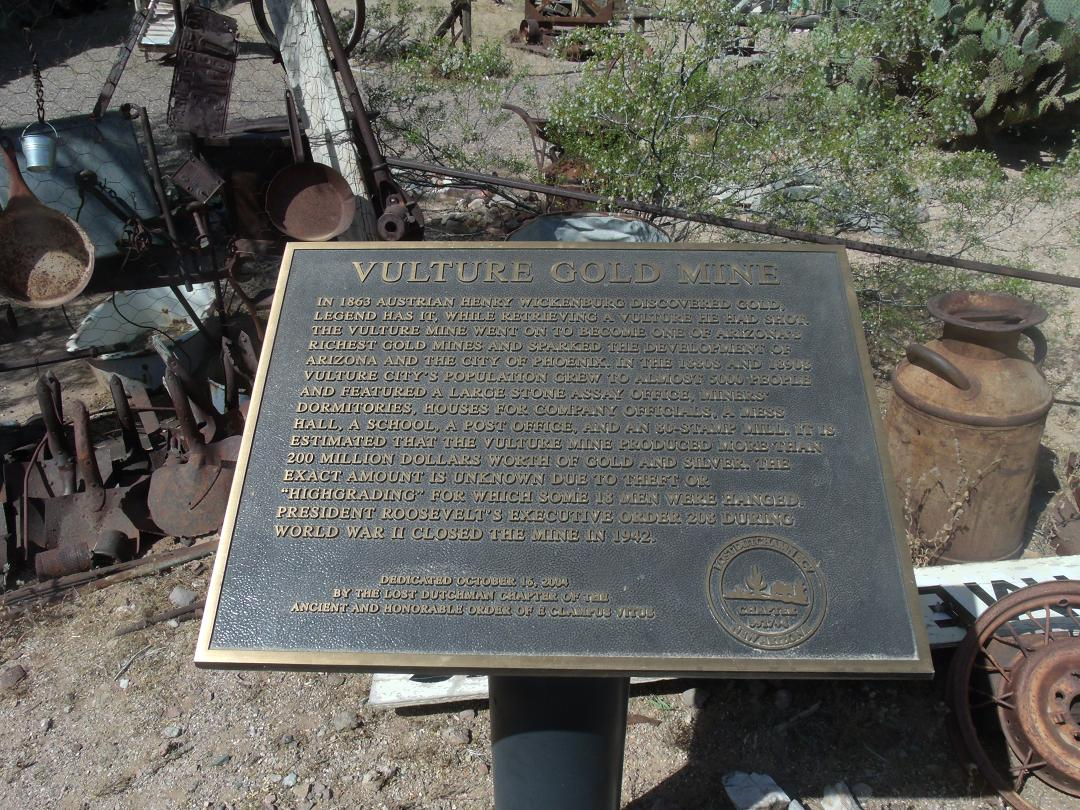
- Vulture Mine Marker

- Location within Arizona
- Location: Arizona, United States; 33°52′44″N 112°47′42″W
- Products: Gold, Silver
- Opened: 1863
- Closed: 1942

The Vulture Mine was a gold mine and settlement in Maricopa County, Arizona, United States. The mine began in 1863 and became the most productive gold mine in Arizona history. From 1863 to 1942 A.D., the mine produced 340,000 ounces (9,638.8 kg) of gold and 260,000 ounces (7,370.9 kgs) of silver. Historically, the mine attracted more than 5,000 people to the area, and is credited with founding the town of Wickenburg, Arizona. The town that served the mine was known as Vulture City.

== History ==
The Vulture mine began when a prospector from California's gold rush, Henry Wickenburg, discovered a quartz deposit containing gold and began mining the outcrop himself. In 1863, after Henry Wickenburg discovered the Vulture mine, Vulture City, a small mining town, was established in the area. The town once had a population of 5,000 citizens. After the mine closed, the city was abandoned and became a "ghost town". The deposit was later sold to Benjamin Phelps, who represented a group of investors that eventually organized under the name of Vulture Mining Company.

The desert surrounding the Vulture Mine did not give much in the way of produce, so an enterprising individual by the name of Jack Swilling went into the Phoenix Valley and reopened the irrigation canals left by the native peoples. Agriculture was brought back to the valley, and a grain route was established. This grain route still exists today under the name of Grand Avenue. Phoenix, Arizona, grew up around the agricultural center spawned by the needs of the Vulture Mine.

In 1942, the Vulture Mine was shut down by a regulatory agency for processing gold. This was a violation at the time because all resources were to be focused on the war effort. The mine appealed the shut-down order and reopened, but with less vigor. A few years later, the mine closed permanently.

As of September 2026, the mine and ghost town are privately owned, and walking tours of some of the remaining buildings of Vulture City are offered. The mine was a lock-down site on Ghost Adventures on the Travel Channel on October 29, 2010.

== Geography ==
The Vulture Mine is located in Maricopa County at 36610 N. 355th Avenue, Wickenburg, Arizona, United States, Zip code: 85390.

== Vulture Mine and Vulture City (Ghost town) ==
The following are images with a brief description of the Vulture Mine and some of the structures still present in what once was known as Vulture City.

Historic Vulture Mine and Vulture City (Ghost town)
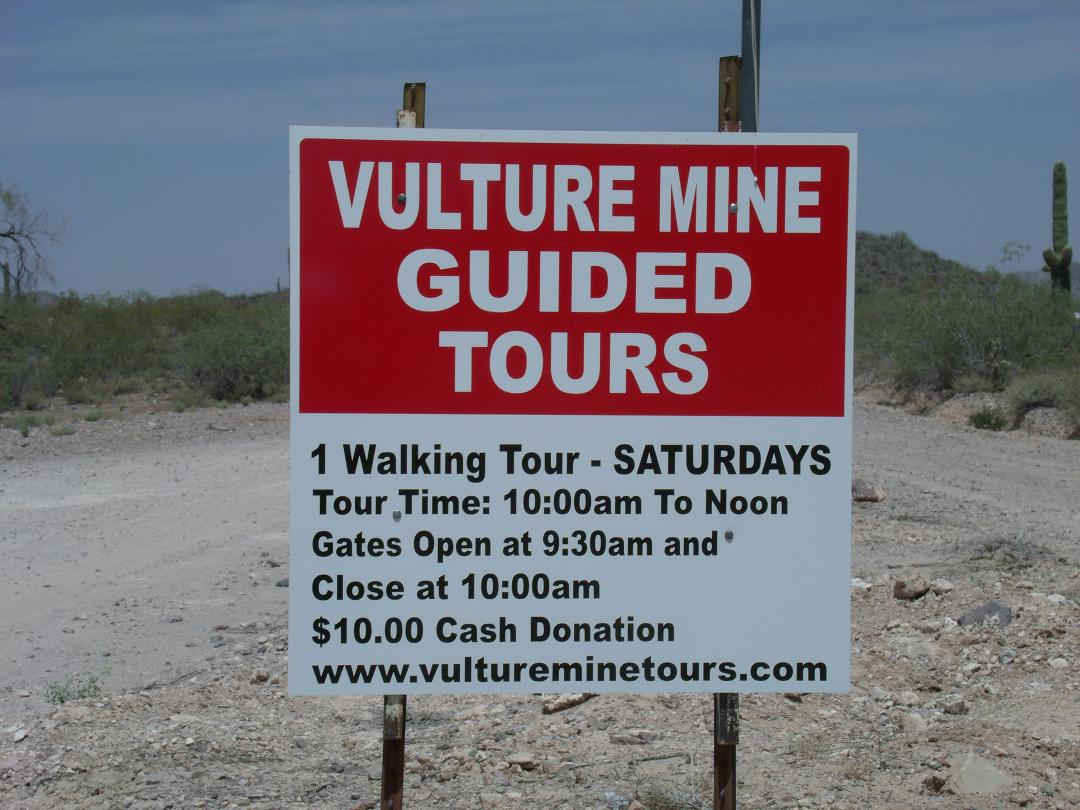
Entrance to Vulture Mine and Vulture City ghost town.

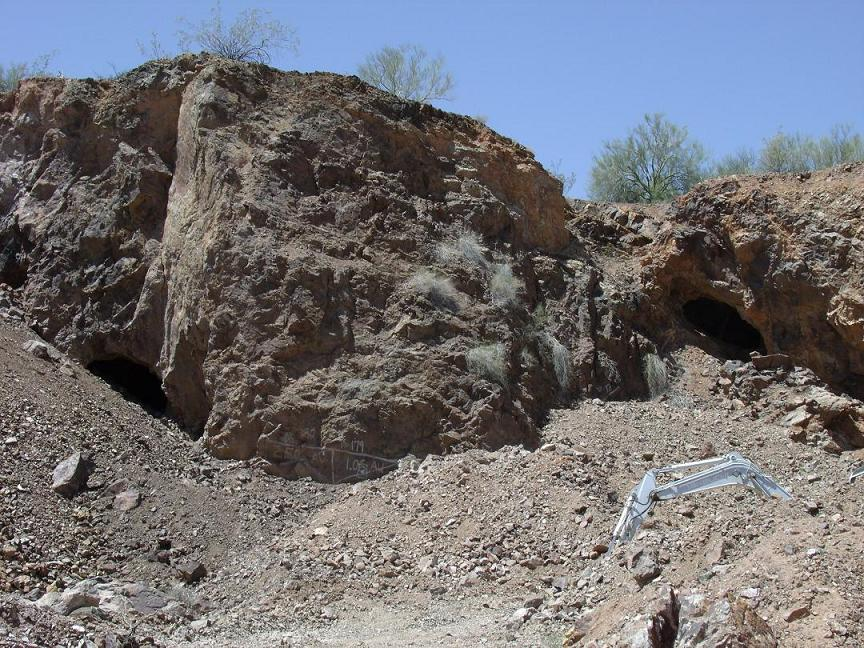
Vulture Mine, Vulture Mountain and caves.

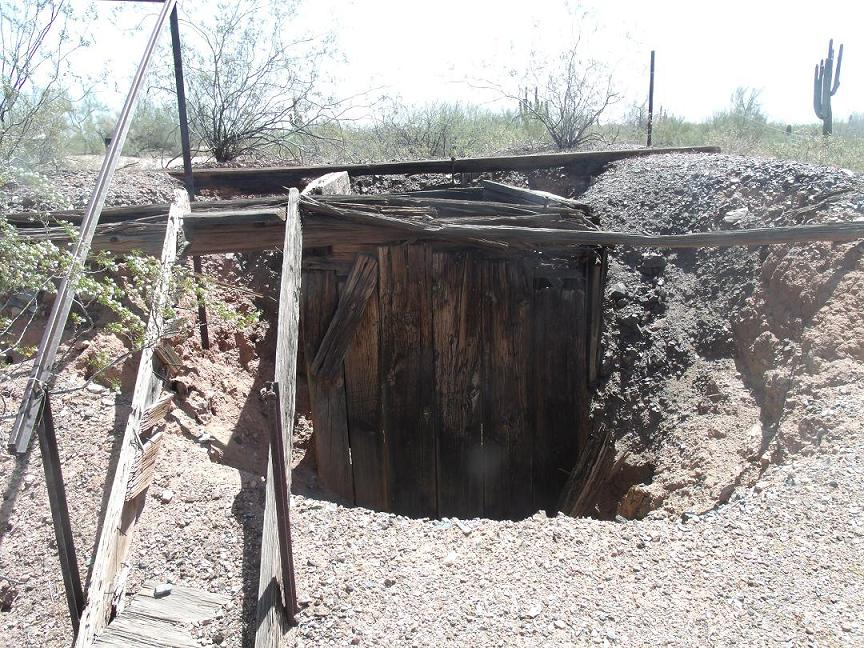
Nickel Shaft.

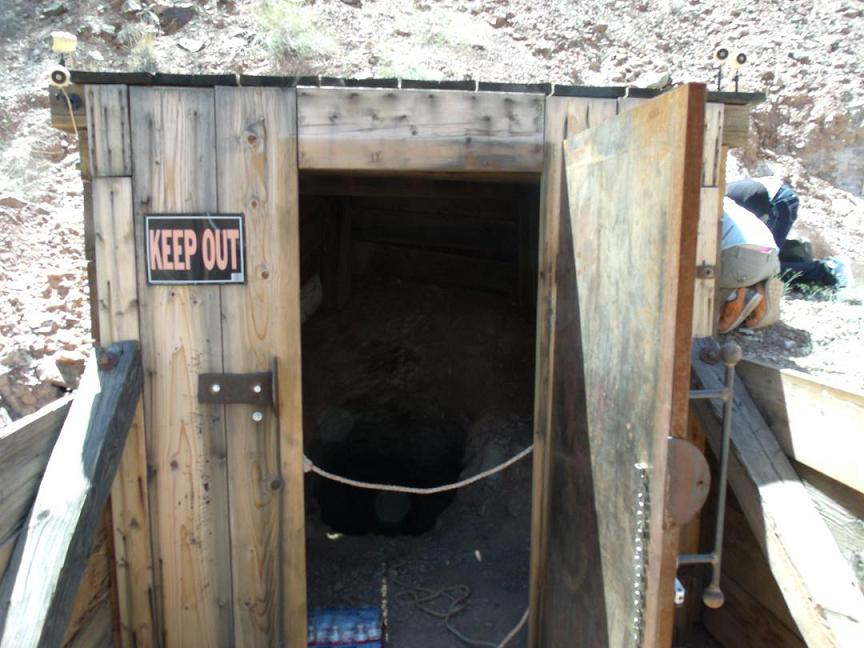
Entrance to the Vulture Mine gold mine shaft.

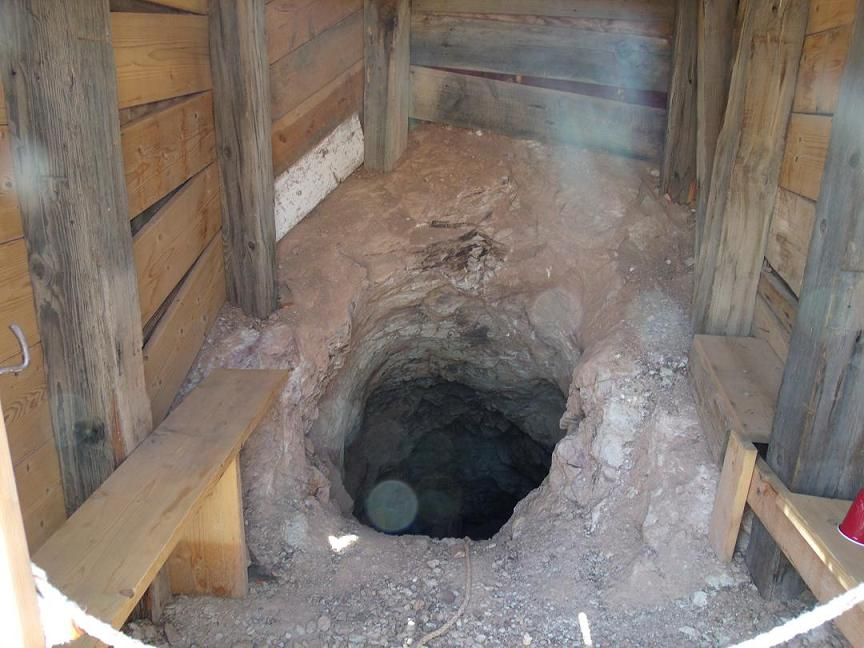
Inside of the entrance of the gold mine shaft.

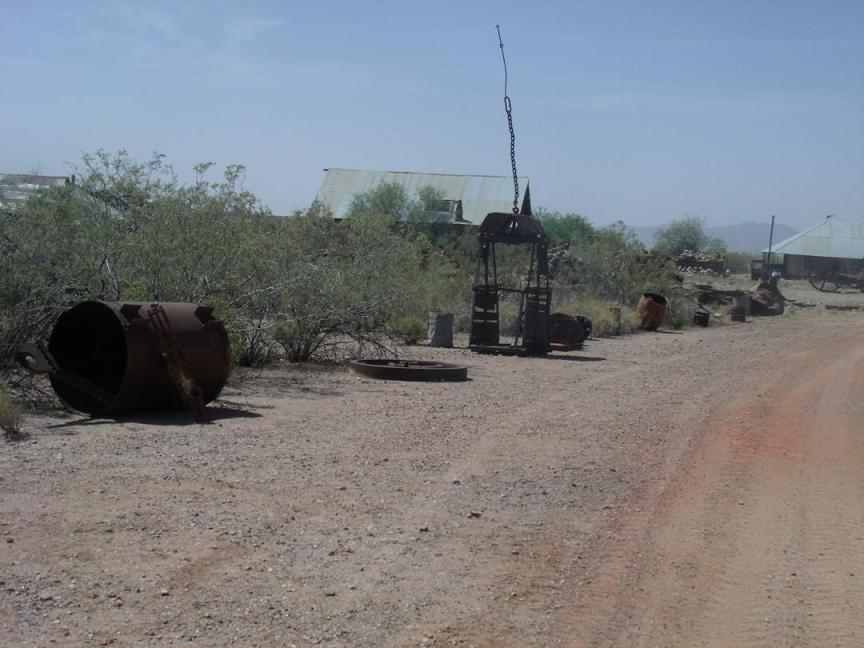
Some of the mining equipment once used.

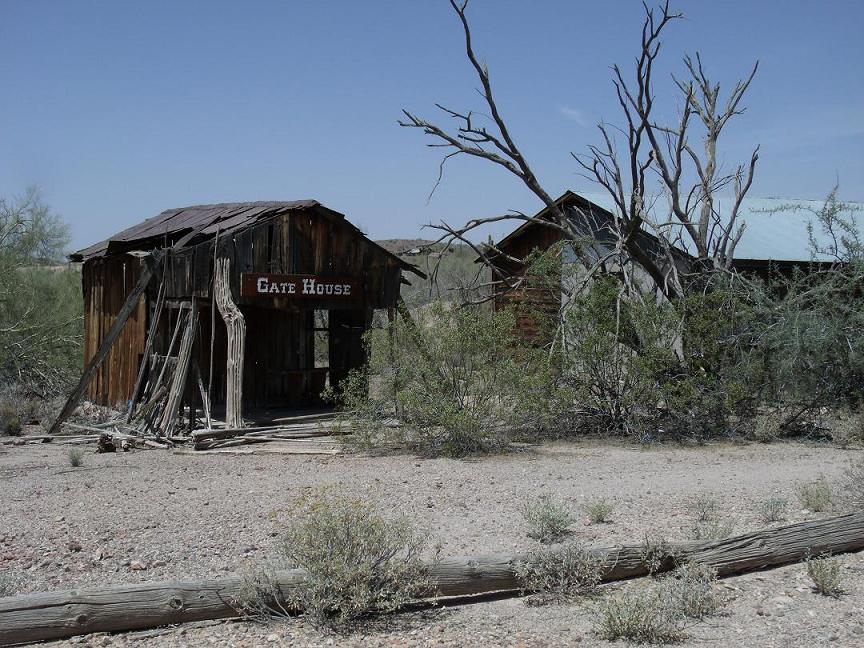
Vulture City Gate House.

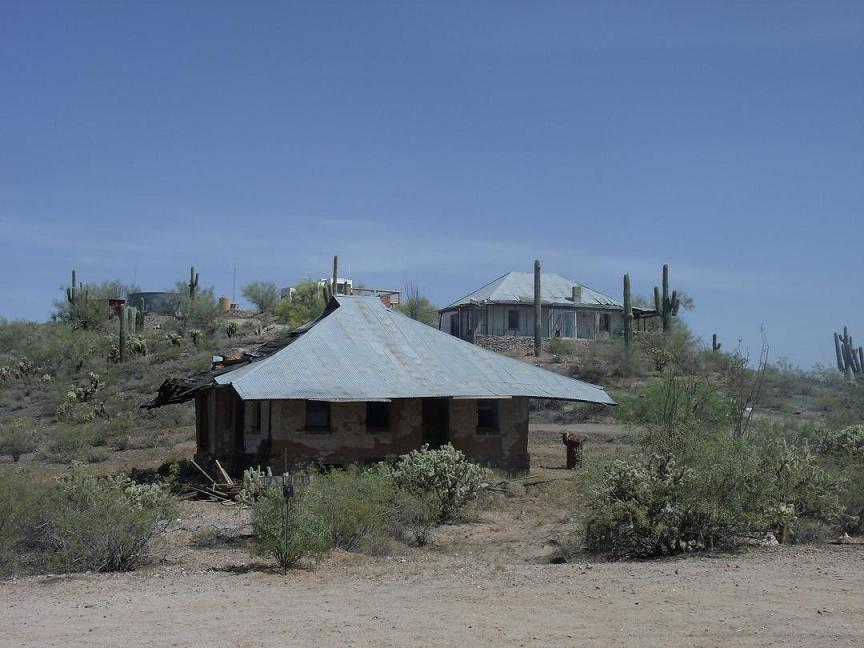
Vulture City Ghost town houses.

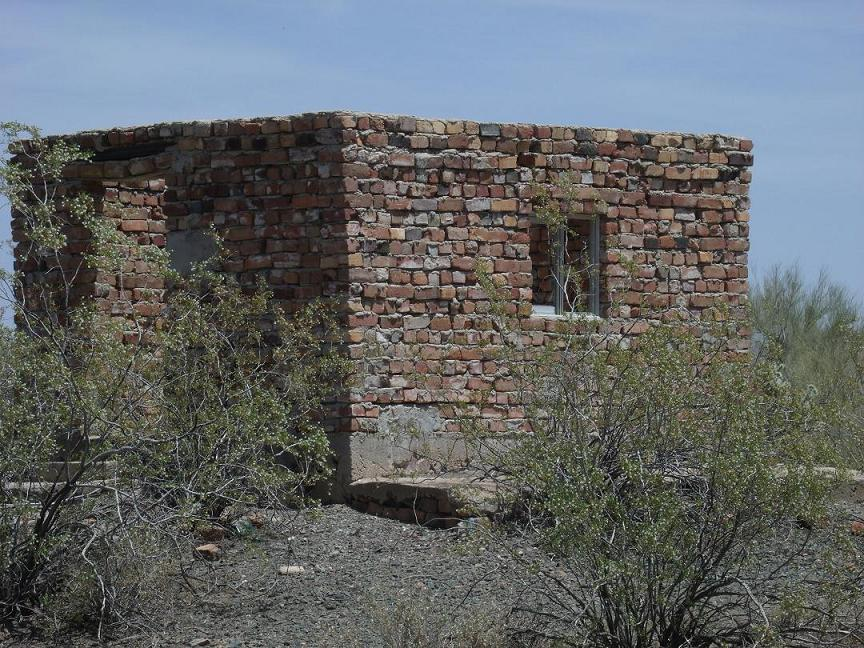
Vulture City Dynamite House where dynamite and ammo was stored.

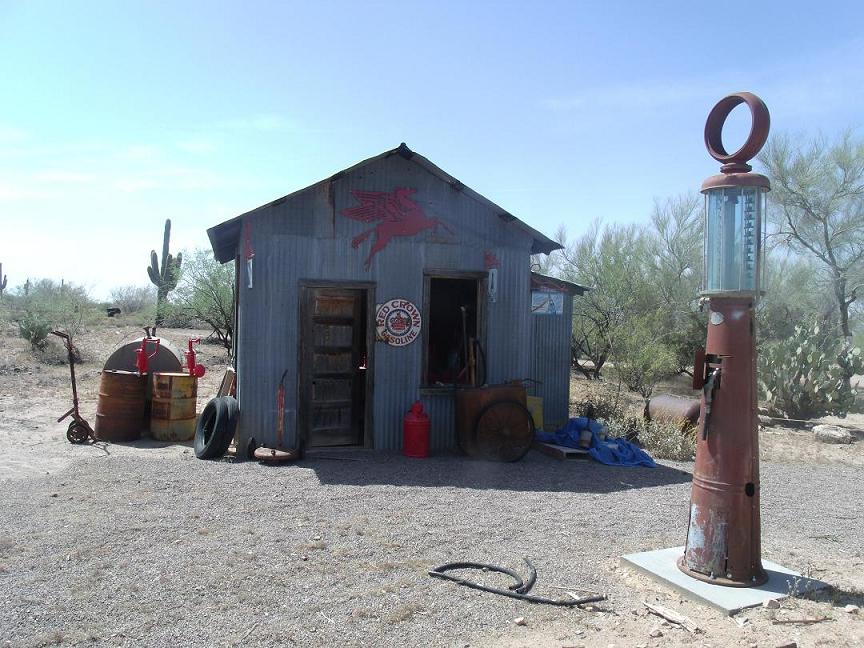
Vulture City Gas Station.

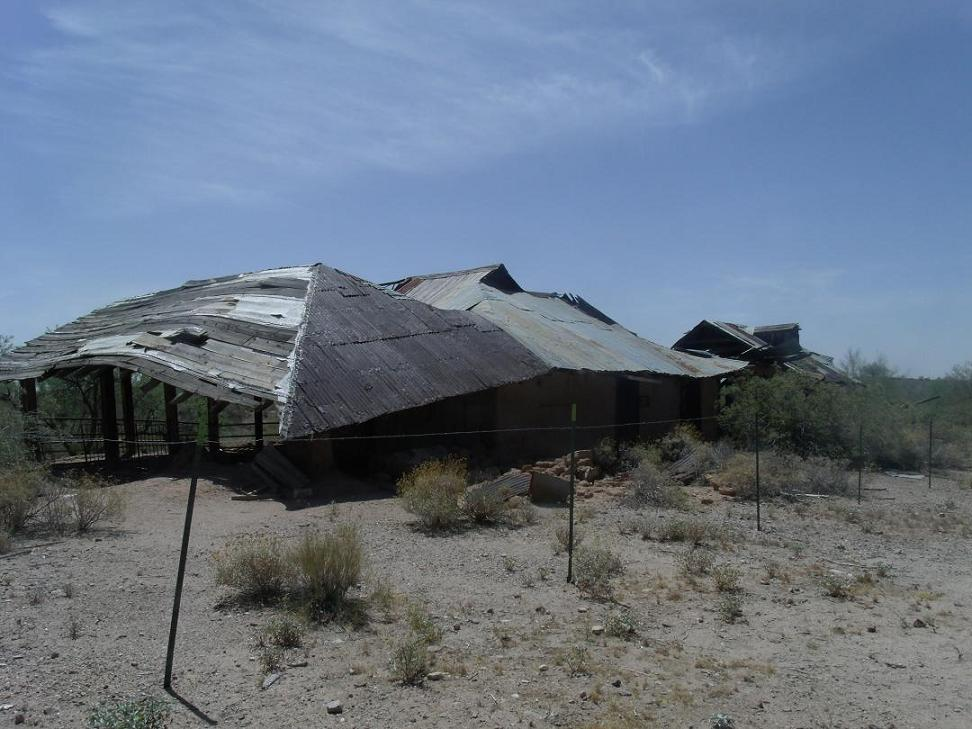
The Vulture City Workshop.

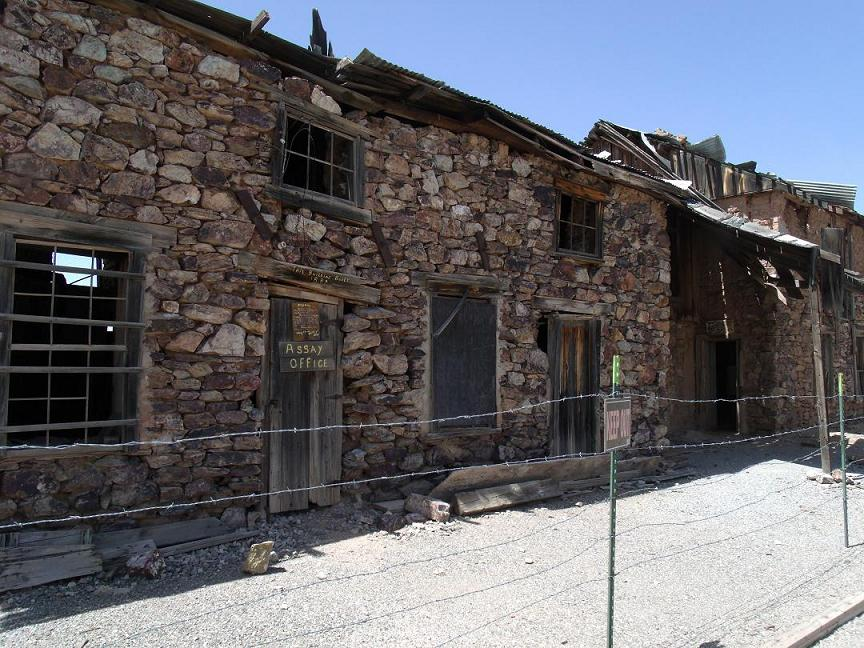
The Vulture Mine-Assay office, built in 1884, in Vulture City.

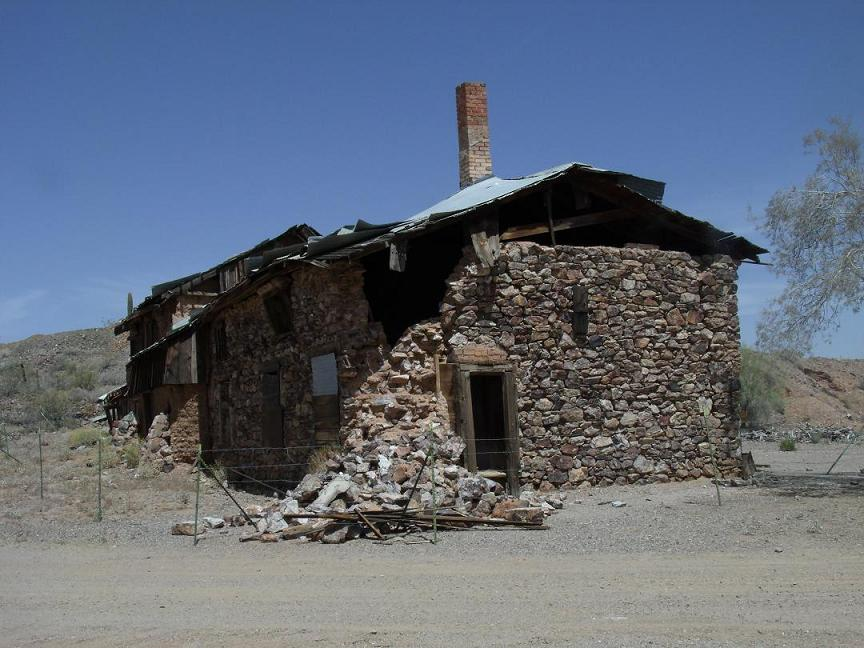
Side view of the Vulture Mine-Assay office

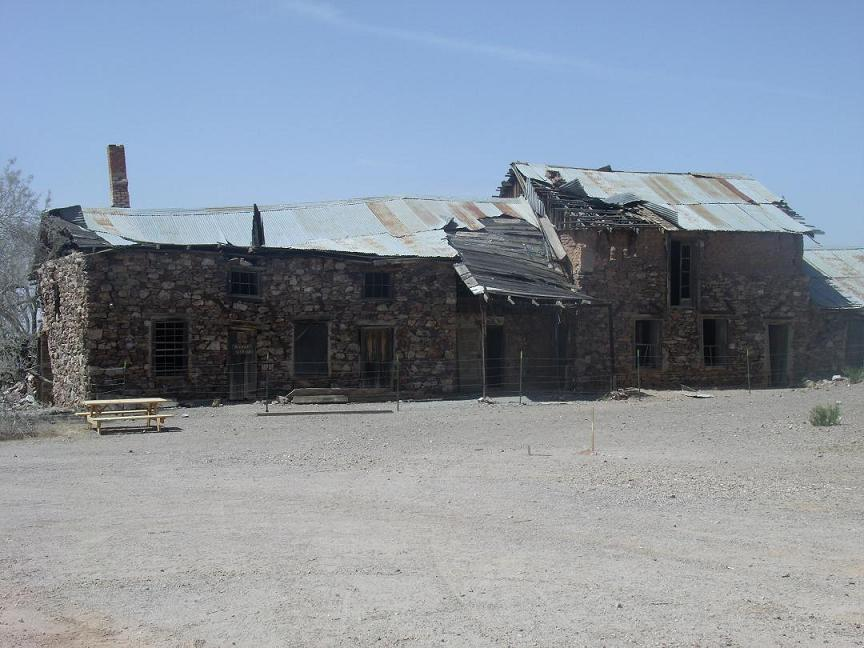
Full view of the Vulture_Mine-Assay office.

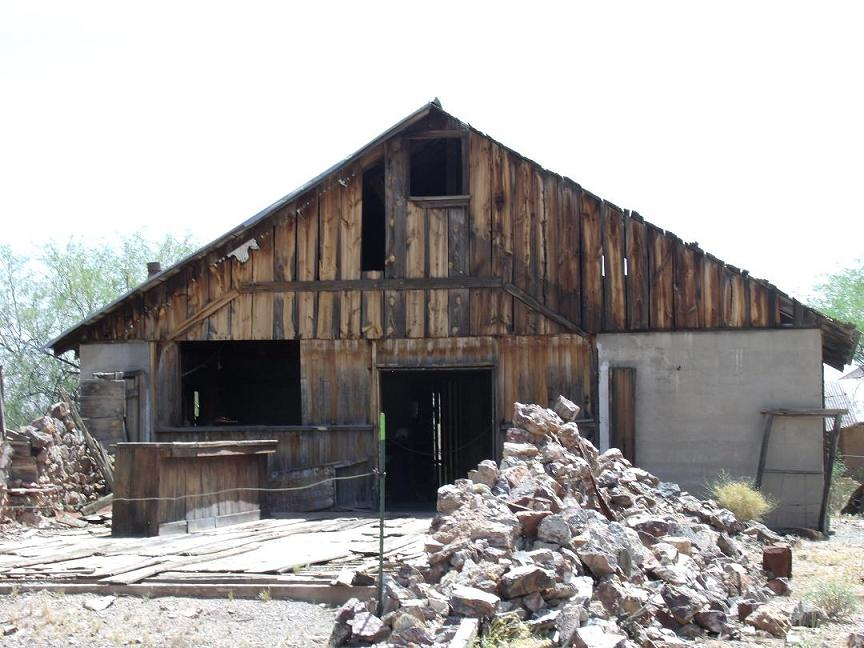
Vulture City Chow House where the miners ate.

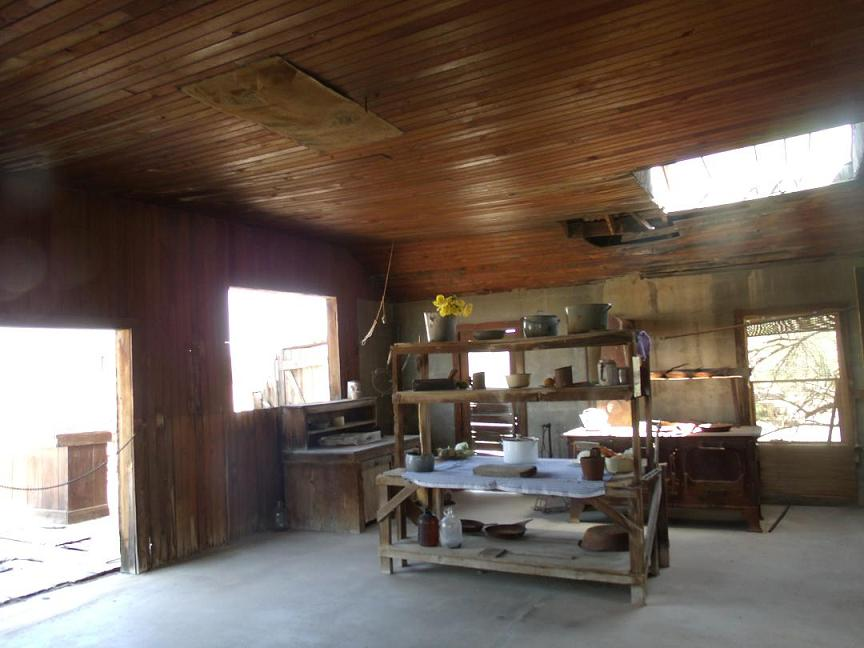
The kitchen of the Vulture City Chow House.

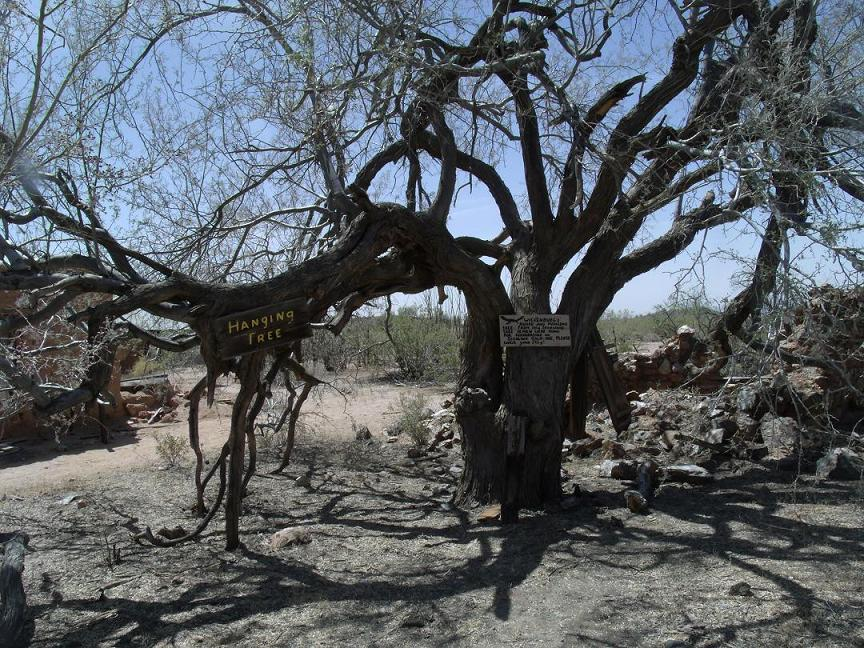
Vulture City Hanging Tree.

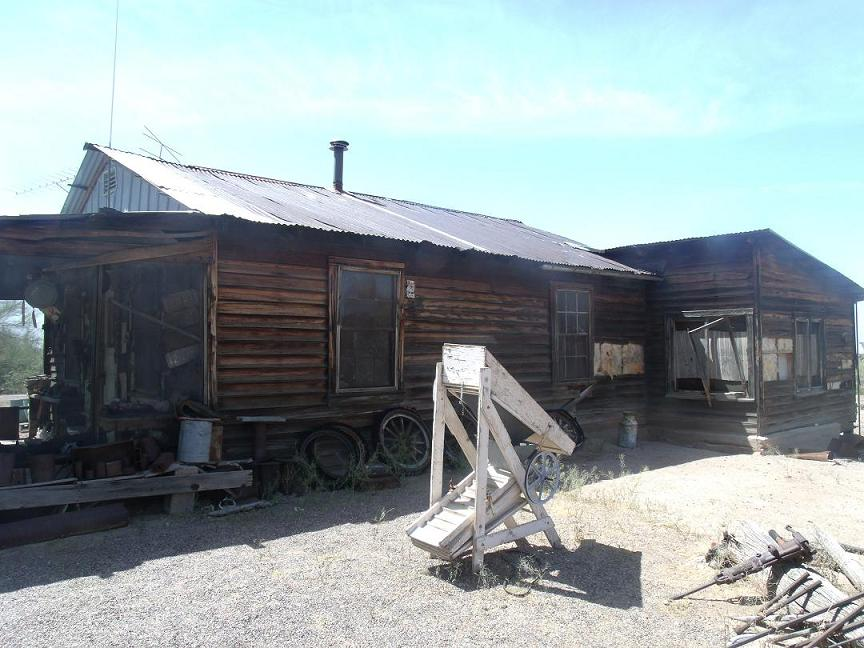
One of the Miners Living Quarters in Vulture City.

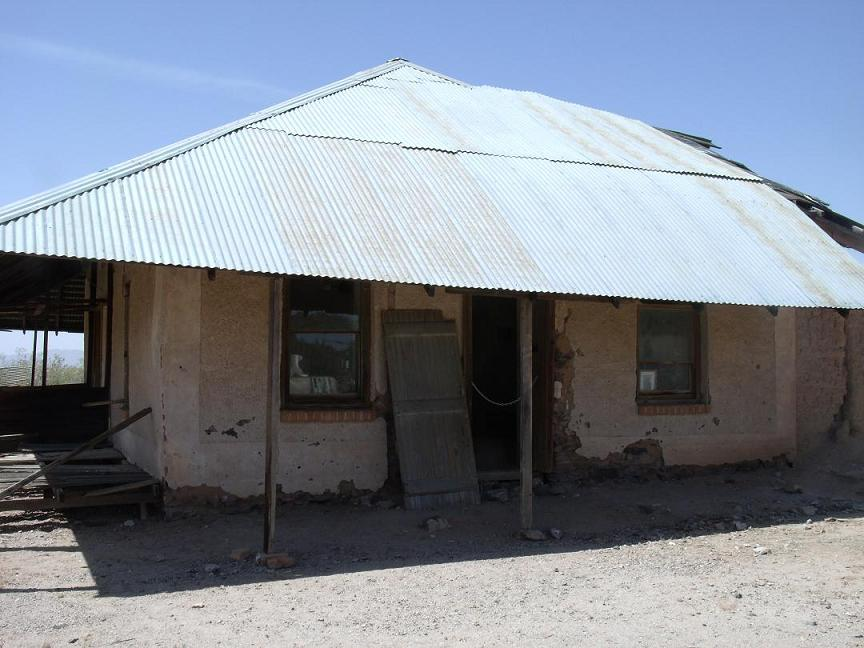
Rita's Brothel in Vulture City.

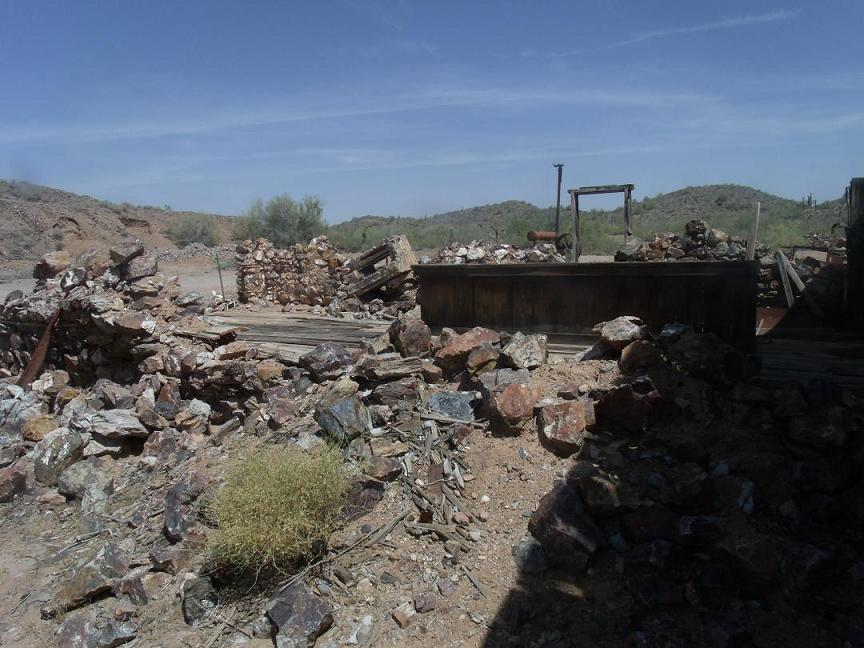
The ruins of the Vulture City Saloon.

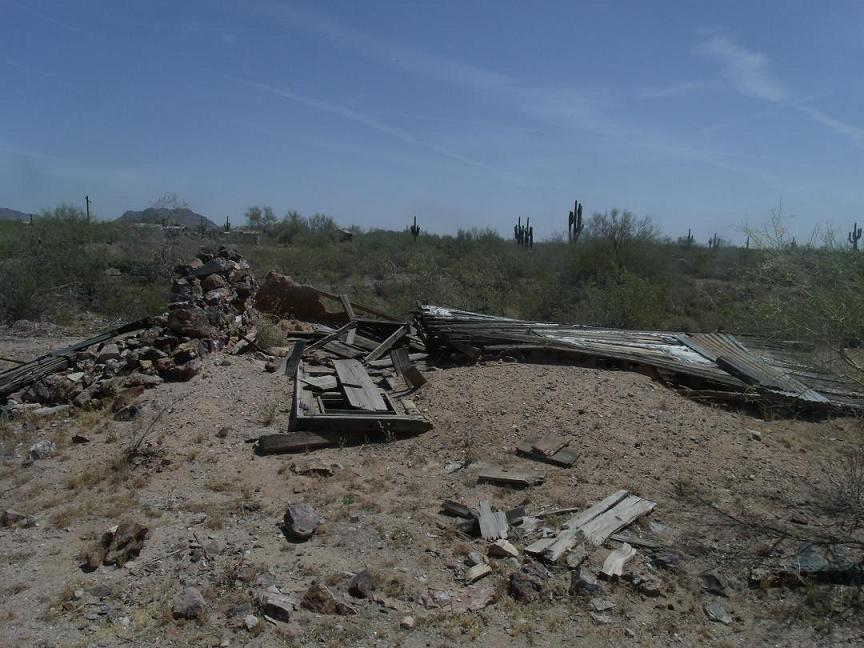
The ruins of the Vulture City Post Office which opened in 1880 and whose postmaster was Henry Wickenburg.

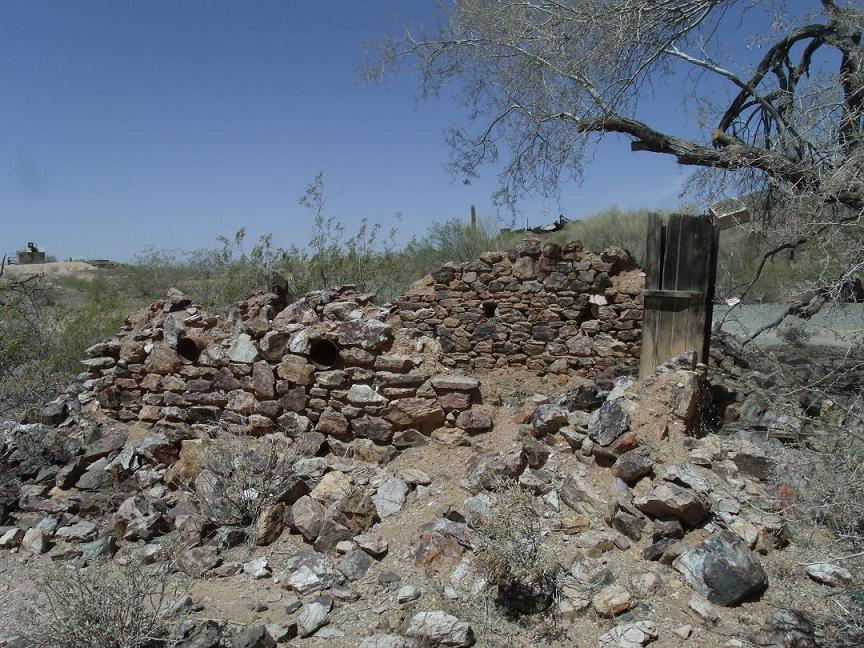
The ruins of Henry Wickenburg's Settlers Home in Vulture City.

== See also ==
- Vulture Mountains
- Henry Wickenburg
- Vulture City
- List of historic properties in Wickenburg, Arizona
