= Joe De Yong =

American sculptor (1894–1975)

- Born: Joseph Franklin de Yong; 1894; Webster Groves, Missouri, U.S.
- Died: 1975 (aged 80–81); Los Angeles, California, U.S.
- Occupations: Sculptor, etcher, historical consultant

Joe De Yong (1894–1975) was an American sculptor, etcher, and historical consultant for Western movies. His sculptures and etchings depicted the Old West, including Native Americans and cowboys, as well as polo players.

== Early life ==
De Yong was born in 1894 in Webster Groves, Missouri. He grew up in Washington County, Oklahoma.

== Career ==
De Yong began his career by working on Western movies in Hollywood alongside silent actor Tom Mix. From 1916 to 1926, he worked for Western artist Charles M. Russell in Montana and California. He also worked on Howard Eaton's ranch in Wyoming.

De Yong subsequently moved to Santa Barbara, California, where he worked alongside Edward Borein and Maynard Dixon. He was the official artist of the rancheros visitadores, an equestrian social club in Santa Barbara.

De Yong returned to the movie industry as a costume designer and historical consultant in the 1930s–1950s. He worked on The Plainsman in 1937, Union Pacific in 1939, Buffalo Bill in 1944, Red River in 1948, and Shane 1953.

De Yong's etchings depicted the Old West, including Native Americans and cowboys, as well as polo players.

== Death and legacy ==
De Yong died in 1975 in Los Angeles, California. His work can be seen at the National Cowboy & Western Heritage Museum and the Will Rogers Museum in Oklahoma, and the William S. Hart Museum in California.

De Yong's friend, Richard J. Flood, inherited his estate and became an art dealer.
