= Dude Ranchers Association =

American trade association

The Dude Ranchers Association is a trade association for promoting and standardizing dude ranches in North America. It was founded in Billings, Montana, in 1926. The association works to preserve the qualities of isolation, remoteness, and unmodified nature in wilderness areas and national forests to sell the dude ranch vacation as the only true American vacation where guests can experience a working ranch in conditions that simulate the American frontier experience.

== History ==
As the railroads expanded, dude ranches appeared across the west and the southwest in the 1920s. In 1926, Ernest Miller of Elkhorn Ranch in Montana and Max Goodsill of the Northern Pacific Railway recognized an opportunity for a mutually beneficial relationship. Goodsill passed the idea along to A. B. Smith, passenger traffic manager for Northern Pacific, who arranged a meeting at the Bozeman Hotel. This became the first official meeting of the association September 27–28, 1926.

Ranchers, railroad officials, and national park officials attended the two-day event to discuss the five objectives:

- Cooperation among ranchers and railroad officials
- Transportation and proper care of guests
- Advertising and publicity for the association
- How to standardize practices
- Create an efficient sales organization

Later, the ranchers added a sixth objective: the organized protection of fish and game.

Larry Larom of Valley Ranch was instrumental in starting the organization and became the organization's first president. Ernest Miller was named secretary-treasurer. Twenty-six ranches were charter members in 1926; it grew to 47 the second year.

Today, the Dude Ranchers Association has over 100 ranch members and over 150 affiliated members.
