= Vulture Mountains =

Low level mountain range in Arizona

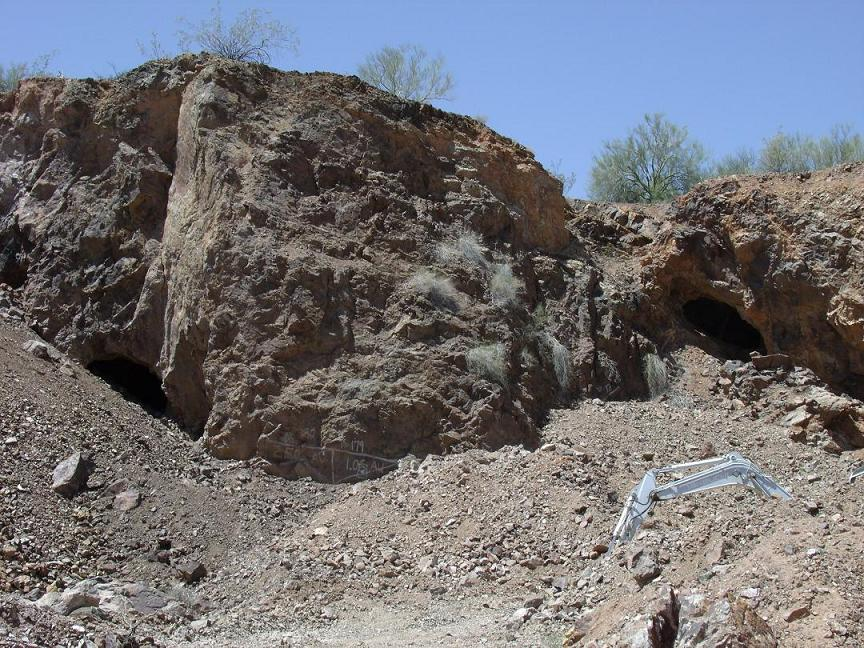
- Vulture Mountain and caves in the Vulture Mine area.

Highest point
- Peak: Vulture Peak
- Elevation: 3,658 ft (1,115 m)
- Coordinates: 33°52′44″N 112°47′42″W

Dimensions
- Length: 29 mi (47 km) E-W

Geography
- Location within Arizona
- Country: United States
- State: Arizona
- Region: Sonoran Desert
- County: Maricopa
- Landmarks/rivers: Hassayampa River Preserve, Vulture Mine and Hassayampa River
- Communities: Wickenburg, Aguila and Morristown
- Range coordinates: 33°52′44″N 112°47′42″W
- Borders on: Harquahala Mountains, Aguila Valley, Wickenburg, Hassayampa River and Hassayampa Plain

The Vulture Mountains is a 29-mile (47 km) long, arid, low-elevation mountain range located in northwest Maricopa County, Arizona, United States. It is in the north perimeter region of the Sonoran Desert. The Arizona transition zone mountain ranges lie north and northeast, just north of Wickenburg. The Yarnell Hill, about 14 miles (23 km) north of Wickenburg, rising into the Weaver Mountains to Yarnell, marks the dramatic elevation rise from the desert. It is also a viewpoint southwest and southeast of the desert regions, including the Vulture Mountains.

== Description and geography ==
The Vulture Mountains are about 29 miles (47 km) long, and east of center, about 13 miles (21 km) wide; the range is somewhat crescent shaped, mainly trending east–west, and narrowing westwards. The northeast is followed by the course of a southeast stretch of the Hassayampa River; the river turns due-south west of Morristown, on US 60, making the east terminus of the range about 7 mi wide, at the river's floodplain. The Hassayampa enters the north of the Hassayampa Plain, so a small river canyon region lies at the Vulture Mountains' northeast, with the Wickenburg Mountains northeast, and the Hieroglyphic Mountains east.

The high point of the range is Vulture Peak (3,658 feet (1,115 m)), at the center east of the range. Another major peak anchors the west region of the range, Black Butte, at 3,612 feet (1,101 m)).

== Access ==
The major access to the north and east foothills of the Vulture Mountains is by way of U.S. Route 60. The route traverses from Aguila at the northwest, Wickenburg at the northeast, and a southeast stretch at the mountains northeast, with the route paralleling the Hassayampa River.

A paved route dissects the range on a south-southwest direction from Wickenburg, which lies on the mountain range's foothills, with the route being east of the mountain range center. Numerous unimproved routes exit from the route into the mountain areas, or they access the southern side of the mountain range (the north of the Hassayampa Plain).

Unimproved routes are restricted on the east side foothills, since it is the floodplain, watershed region of the Hassayampa River, where the riverbed has widened to up to 1.5 mi in some locales. One major unimproved route crosses the Hassayampa west from Morristown.

== Historic structures of the Vulture Mine and City ==
In 1863, after Henry Wickenburg discovered the Vulture Mine, the small mining town Vulture City was established in the area. The town once had a population of 5,000 citizens. After the mine closed the city was deserted and became a ghost town. Some of the structures are still present in what once was known as Vulture City located in the mountain.

== See also ==
- Vulture Mine
- Henry Wickenburg
- Wickenburg, Arizona
- Vulture City, Arizona
- List of mountain ranges of Maricopa County, Arizona
