= Larry Larom =

Irving Hastings "Larry" Larom
- Born: June 3, 1889; New York City, USA
- Died: December 23, 1973 (aged 84); Cody, Park County; Wyoming
- Education: Princeton University
- Occupations: Rancher founder of Dude Ranchers Association
- Political party: Republican
- Spouse: Irma Larom
- Children: No children

Irving Hastings Larom, known as Larry Larom (June 3, 1889 – December 23, 1973), was the founding president of the Dude Ranchers Association and an owner of the former Valley Ranch near Yellowstone National Park in northwestern Wyoming.

== Background ==
Born in New York City, Larom's father was a prominent merchant there. Larom attended Buffalo Bill's Wild West Show in Madison Square Garden in New York City in 19 and became inspired to travel to Cody in northwestern Wyoming the following year for a summer vacation on Jim McLaughlin’s Valley Home Ranch. After three more summer visits there, he decided to become a dude rancher. He persuaded a fellow New Yorker, Winthrop Brooks, to become his partner in the purchase and operation of Valley Ranch on the south fork of the Shoshone River. Larom and Brooks, scions of wealthy New York families and educated at Princeton University, had an advantage in selling the concept of a dude ranch vacation to members of their social class. In a few years Brooks left the partnership and was the president of Brooks Brothers men's clothier from 1935 to 1946.

== Dude rancher ==
After sponsoring pack trips for both boys and girls into Yellowstone, Larom in 1922 established a college preparatory school for boys. The operation folded in 1934 because of the impact of the Great Depression.

In 1926, Larom was instrumental in the establishment of the Dude Ranchers Association and became its first president. Larom was also involved in the civic and cultural affairs in Cody, where he died in 1973.
