= John K. Rollinson =

John K. Rollinson (May 14, 1884 – March 2, 1948) was an American writer of western non-fiction. He wrote an autobiography titled Pony Trails in Wyoming.

== Career ==
Born in Buffalo, New York, Rollinson was inspired by Buffalo Bill’s Wild West exhibition to travel to the West and become a cowboy. Rollinson arrived in Cheyenne, Wyoming, in 1903 and gained experience as a ranch hand before moving to Cody, Wyoming, in November 1905. Rollinson worked at various jobs in and around Cody until 1907 when he was appointed a ranger in the Yellowstone Timber Reserve. There he was in charge of the Sunlight Ranger Station located in the mountainous region north of Cody. Rollinson patrolled the entire Sunlight Basin on horseback to fulfill his responsibilities to protect the forestlands.

Rollinson resigned from this position in 1911, and until 1915 he worked for Eveline Painter at Sunlight Valley Ranch assisting her in the dude business. In 1915 Rollinson went to work in Altadena, California, for his stepfather as a patent medicine salesman, a position he held until his death on March 2, 1948.

== Autobiography ==
Rollinson wrote his autobiography Pony Trails in Wyoming, in which he describes cattle ranching in southeastern Wyoming and his life as a ranger in the Sunlight Basin of Wyoming. He wrote a second book, Wyoming Cattle Trails, a history of early cattlemen in the state.

== Works ==
- 1941: Pony Trails in Wyoming
- 1948: Wyoming Cattle Trails
