= Vulture City, Arizona =

Ghost town in Maricopa County, Arizona

- Ghost town
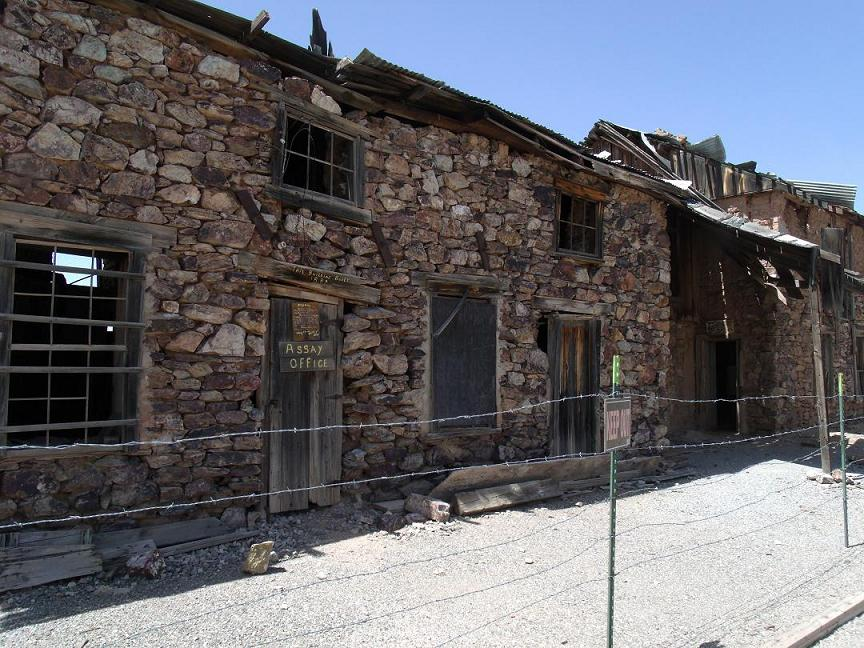
- Vulture Mine-Assay office, built in 1884

- Location within Arizona Location within the United States
- Coordinates: 33°49′02″N 112°49′59″W
- Country: United States
- State: Arizona
- County: Maricopa

Vulture City is a ghost town situated at the site of the defunct Vulture Mine in Maricopa County, Arizona, United States.

== Vulture Mine ==
Vulture Mine was a gold mine which was discovered in 1863. It was the most productive gold mine in the history of Arizona. From 1863 to 1942, the mine produced 340,000 ounces (9,638.8 kgs) of gold and 260,000 ounces (7,370.9 kgs) of silver. The mine was discovered when Henry Wickenburg, a prospector from California's gold rush, stumbled upon a quartz deposit containing gold while traveling in Arizona. Wickenburg began mining the outcrop himself.

In 1863, after Henry Wickenburg discovered the mine, Vulture City, a small mining town, was established in the area. Vulture City's post office was established on October 4, 1880, and Henry Wickenburg was the town's first postmaster. The town had more than five boarding houses and several buildings. The huge Vulture Mine-Assay Office building, built in 1884, still stands today. The town also had a cookhouse and mess hall plus stores, saloons and even a school. The town once had a population of 5,000 citizens. It was marked by violence. Eighteen men were hanged on an ironwood tree located by the ruins of Henry Wickenburg's house.

== Abandonment ==
After the mine closed, the city was abandoned and its buildings decayed, becoming a ghost town. The deposit was later sold to Benjamin Phelps, who represented a group of investors that eventually organized under the name of Vulture Mining Company. The mine continued to produce at a decreased level until World War II, when it was permanently closed. More recently, the owner has offered a two-hour, dirt path guided walking tour of the mine.

== Gallery ==
The following is a list, which includes a photographic gallery, of some of the remaining structures of historic significance in what once was known as Vulture City. Some of these structures are just mere ruins while others are still standing in fairly good condition. Also included in the gallery are some images of the Vulture Mine.

Images of Vulture City and Mine

	Name	Image		Name	Image
1	Vulture City main gate house		2	Houses	
3	Dynamite House where dynamite and ammo was stored.		4	Gas station	
5	Workshop		6	The Vulture_Mine-Assay office.	
7	Side view of the Vulture Mine-Assay office		8	Vulture City Chow House where the miners ate.	
9	The Vulture City Chow House kitchen.		10	Hanging Tree.	
11	The ruins of Henry Wickenburg's Settlers Home in Vulture City.		12	One of the Miners Living Quarters	
13	Rita's Brothel		14	The ruins of the Vulture City Saloon	
15	The ruins of the Vulture City Post Office which opened in 1880 and whose postmaster was Henry Wickenburg		16	Original equipment used in the Vulture Mine	
17	Vulture Mine and Vulture Mountain and caves.		18	Nickel Shaft	
19	Entrance to the Vulture Mine gold mine shaft.		20	Inside of the entrance of the gold mine shaft.	
21	The Texas Hotel was built in 1895 in Vulture City. In 1904, the hotel was moved to Wickenburg. The hotel had a restaurant on the street floor and eight rental units upstairs.				

== See also ==
- Vulture Mountains
