= Pahaska Tepee =

- U.S. National Register of Historic Places
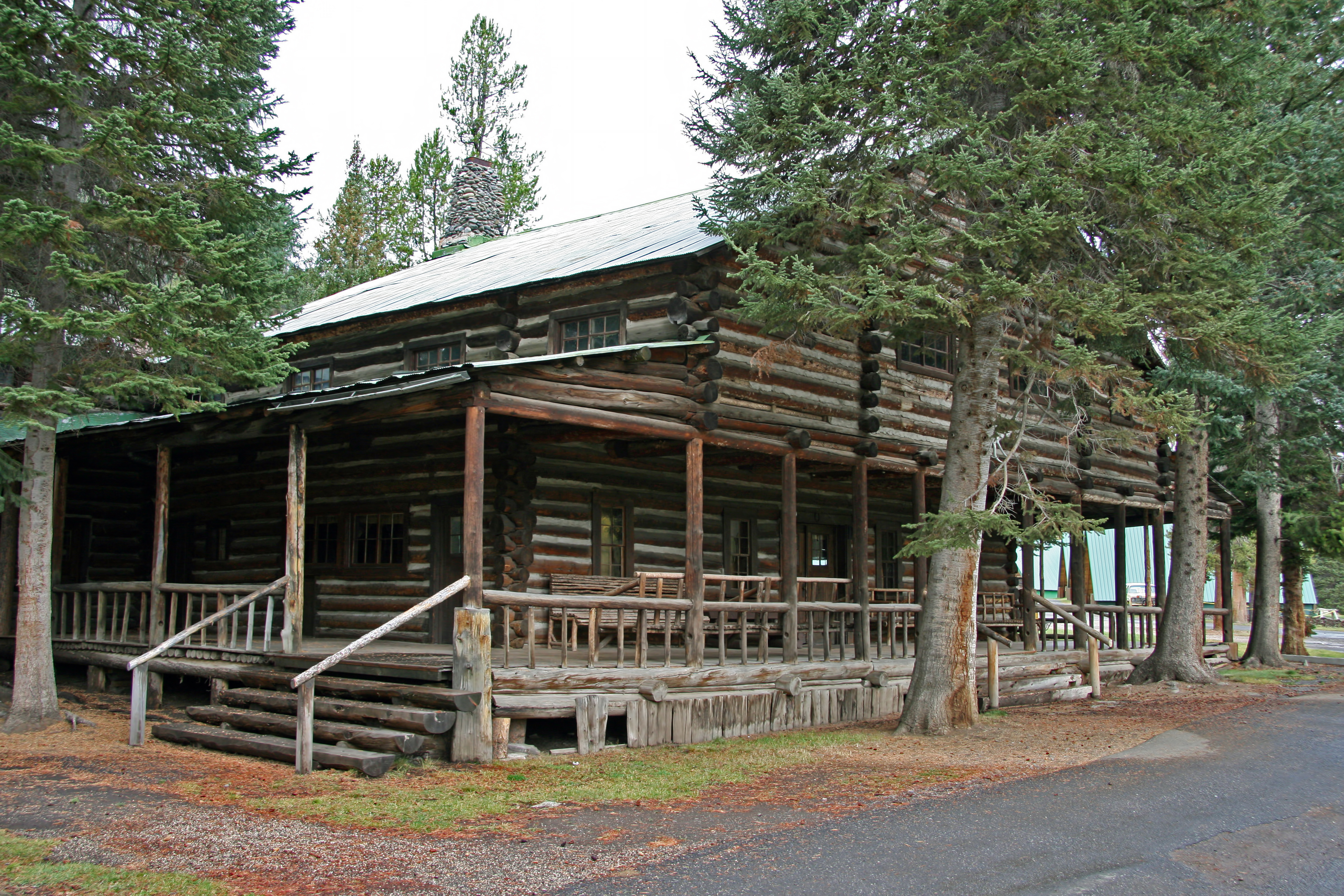
- Pahaska Tepee

- Location within Wyoming Location within the United States
- Location: 2 miles east of East Entrance , Yellowstone National Park
- Nearest city: Cody, Wyoming
- Coordinates: 44°30′10″N 109°57′46″W
- NRHP reference No.: 73001938
- Added to NRHP: 1973

Pahaska Tepee is William "Buffalo Bill" Cody's old hunting lodge and hotel in the U.S. state of Wyoming. It is located 50 miles (80 km) west of the town of Cody and two miles from the east entrance to Yellowstone National Park.

== History ==
Cody built Pahaska Tepee to accommodate tourists traveling up the Cody Road along the North Fork of the Shoshone River to visit Yellowstone. While on a hunting expedition in November 1901, Cody marked the location of the hunting lodge with a hand ax. The artist Abraham Archibald Anderson designed Pahaska for Cody sometime during 1902 or 1903 and construction started soon after. The grand opening of Pahaska Tepee was announced on July 5, 1904 in the Cody newspaper. In November 1904 Cody led a large hunting party from his new lodge for a ten-day hunt. Construction was completed in 1905, and the lodge was opened to guests.

== Description ==
The main structure (the "Tepee") is a two-story log structure measuring about 83.5 by 60 feet (25.5 by 18.3 m). The building faces east, down the valley of the Shoshone River. The main level is surrounded by porches on the north, south and east, with a main entrance centered on the eastern porch. The double doors lead into a hall the extends to the roof, with a stone fireplace at the opposite end. The dining room is behind the fireplace. The hall is surrounded by mezzanine galleries. A small suite of rooms over the east porch was used by Cody. There are an additional six bedrooms over the porches and two baths on this level, and seven more rooms downstairs. A 1920 kitchen-dining room addition lasted until 1962, when it was demolished.

== Climate ==
Climate data for Pahaska, Wyoming, 1991–2020 normals: 6692ft (2040m)
Month	Jan	Feb	Mar	Apr	May	Jun	Jul	Aug	Sep	Oct	Nov	Dec	Year
Record high °F (°C)	52 (11)	56 (13)	64 (18)	78 (26)	85 (29)	95 (35)	100 (38)	100 (38)	91 (33)	79 (26)	63 (17)	51 (11)	100 (38)
Mean maximum °F (°C)	44.6 (7.0)	46.7 (8.2)	54.4 (12.4)	66.2 (19.0)	76.5 (24.7)	86.5 (30.3)	92.1 (33.4)	90.4 (32.4)	83.7 (28.7)	71.1 (21.7)	55.1 (12.8)	42.7 (5.9)	91.8 (33.2)
Mean daily maximum °F (°C)	31.9 (−0.1)	33.8 (1.0)	43.0 (6.1)	48.4 (9.1)	61.1 (16.2)	71.1 (21.7)	82.1 (27.8)	80.2 (26.8)	69.3 (20.7)	52.5 (11.4)	38.5 (3.6)	29.7 (−1.3)	53.5 (11.9)
Daily mean °F (°C)	19.6 (−6.9)	21.1 (−6.1)	28.5 (−1.9)	34.8 (1.6)	44.9 (7.2)	52.7 (11.5)	60.7 (15.9)	59.2 (15.1)	50.6 (10.3)	38.6 (3.7)	27.0 (−2.8)	18.7 (−7.4)	38.0 (3.4)
Mean daily minimum °F (°C)	7.2 (−13.8)	8.4 (−13.1)	13.9 (−10.1)	21.3 (−5.9)	28.7 (−1.8)	34.3 (1.3)	39.3 (4.1)	38.2 (3.4)	32.0 (0.0)	24.7 (−4.1)	15.5 (−9.2)	7.8 (−13.4)	22.6 (−5.2)
Mean minimum °F (°C)	−14.6 (−25.9)	−18.0 (−27.8)	−3.7 (−19.8)	7.5 (−13.6)	18.0 (−7.8)	27.9 (−2.3)	32.1 (0.1)	30.5 (−0.8)	23.4 (−4.8)	10.0 (−12.2)	−3.0 (−19.4)	−12.5 (−24.7)	−24.6 (−31.4)
Record low °F (°C)	−33 (−36)	−35 (−37)	−32 (−36)	−8 (−22)	7 (−14)	21 (−6)	26 (−3)	24 (−4)	16 (−9)	−9 (−23)	−16 (−27)	−27 (−33)	−35 (−37)
Average precipitation inches (mm)	2.20 (56)	1.87 (47)	2.49 (63)	2.40 (61)	2.65 (67)	2.72 (69)	1.42 (36)	1.28 (33)	1.92 (49)	2.49 (63)	3.08 (78)	2.66 (68)	27.18 (690)
Average snowfall inches (cm)	27.10 (68.8)	31.40 (79.8)	26.50 (67.3)	20.80 (52.8)	3.90 (9.9)	0.10 (0.25)	0.00 (0.00)	0.00 (0.00)	1.80 (4.6)	10.00 (25.4)	26.90 (68.3)	32.00 (81.3)	180.5 (458.45)
Source 1: NOAA
Source 2: XMACIS2 (records & monthly max/mins)

== Present ==
Pahaska Tepee operates as a mountain resort and the original hunting lodge is open for tours. Pahaska Tepee was listed on the National Register of Historic Places in 1973.
