= Guest ranch =

Type of ranch oriented towards visitors or tourism

A guest ranch, also known as a dude ranch, is a type of ranch oriented towards visitors or tourism. It is considered a form of agrotourism.

A man riding Horse and Buggy on Phantom Ranch in the Grand Canyon, 1937

Guest ranches emerged in the late 19th century, towards the end of the American Frontier, and served as a way to experience frontier life without the associated risks. They rose in popularity until peaking in popularity in the mid-1930s.

== History ==
Guest ranches arose in response to the romanticization of the American West that began to occur in the late 19th century. In 1893, as part of his Frontier Thesis, historian Frederick Jackson Turner asserted that the United States frontier was demographically "closed". That, in turn, led many people to have feelings of nostalgia for bygone days, but also, given that the risks of a true frontier were gone, people could safely indulge in this nostalgia. Thus, the person referred to as a "tenderfoot" or a "greenhorn" by Westerners was finally able to visit and enjoy the advantages of western life for a short period of time without needing to risk life and limb.

In 1967, Marshall Sprague wrote that Griff Evans was running a dude ranch near Estes Park, Colorado by 1873, "thirty years before dude ranches were officially invented". When Isabella Bird visited Evans that year, he already had nine men and women as guests. In 1884, a dude ranch near Medora, North Dakota was owned by the Eaton brothers, businessmen from Pittsburgh. It was likely fostered by the collapse of the free-range cattle industry in the late 1880s. Too many ranchers shared the open plains with vast herds of cattle, and in the hard winter of 1886 herds were decimated, with some owners financially ruined overnight.

The Western adventures of famous figures such as Theodore Roosevelt, a neighbor of the Eatons in the 1880s, were made available to paying guests from cities of the East, called "dudes" in the West. In the early years, the transcontinental railroad network brought paying visitors to a local railroad depot, where a wagon or buggy would be waiting to transport people to a ranch. Experiences varied, because some ranch visitors expected a somewhat edited and more luxurious version of the "cowboy life", while others were more tolerant of the odors and timetable of a working ranch. By 1913, it was noted that ranchers had begun to dress as cowboys, and had introduced pageantry, such as an afternoon cattle round-up, to add to the assumed glamour of Western life.

While there were guest ranches prior to the 20th century, the trend grew considerably after the end of World War I. In the early 1920s, guest ranching became popular in Texas. As one rancher near Bandera, Texas, noted: "You can run more dudes to the acre in these hills than you can cattle." Dude wrangling was profitable, and vacationers were easier to handle than stock, although some wranglers considered dudes ornerier than livestock. Around that time, competition with ever-larger and more professional cattle operations possibly contributed to that trend. In 1923, a dude ranch opened in Hawaii, modeled after those in Wyoming. In 1926, the Dude Ranchers Association was founded in Billings, Montana, to represent the needs of this rapidly growing industry. Advertisements during that era were often aimed at the monied classes, and stressed the beauty of the natural scenery, the healthiness of being outdoors, and the wildlife. Recently established national parks in the area were an added tourist attraction.

During the Great Depression the industry continued to expand, likely as an alternative income source for real cattle ranches which were experiencing financial troubles. In the 1930s, dude ranches proliferated along with the Rocky Mountains and around Palm Springs in California. However, they were becoming rarer in Texas, where many areas were inhospitable to cattle, and stock and fodder had to be imported during the dude season.

In 1935, the industry boomed, and Western railroad companies advertised destinations to paying guests. Airlines and travel bureaus also began to enter the business in that period. The University of Wyoming began to offer a degree in recreational ranching, and one could take a four-year course in dude wrangling. Most of the patrons hailed from New York at the time but, as the trips became more popular and less affluent people began to become interested, there was an economic incentive to establish lower-cost dude ranches in the East, including in New York State. In 1943, the Eastern Dude Ranchers' Association was formed. Throughout the 1940s, business remained good, because wars in the rest of the world made foreign travel less attractive.

A 1936 article in the New York Times estimated upwards of 500 dude ranches in the US.

In the 1950s, the growth leveled off, with the number of registered, bona fide dude ranches dropping to 100 in 1958. By the 1960s, especially in Arizona and California, the industry became more professional, with dude ranches becoming more like country clubs, with elegant rooms and diverse recreational amenities such as tennis courts, golf, and heated swimming pools, catering to some 200 guests at a time. Agriculture was no longer practised, and many ranches had no cattle. Establishments with horses for guests needed to import fodder. In turn, other ventures began to turn away from the term, advertising themselves not as a luxury resort or a dude ranch, but a working ranch with guest rooms. That trend had become evident in the 1930s but, by the 1950s, the term dude ranch had become unpopular, with most establishments advertising themselves as simply "ranches", and stressing their bona fides as real farms.

Common to most of those establishments was the free use of horses, while normal resorts charged customers extra for a horse ride. Guests would often ride into the surrounding hills for a camping trip. Some guests preferred to do ranch chores, and that was sometimes advertised, with such guests being advised to visit in the autumn when there were more chores. Eastern ranches often lacked cattle but, to maintain a Western atmosphere, one New York ranch bought a bison from a zoo. Another had an entire Western town built, complete with a saloon, board sidewalks, and a dirt street. The main attraction for most tourists was the myth and adventure of the Wild West.

Western ranches were likely less discriminatory, with very few ranches billing themselves as "restricted", but in the Eastern industry, that practice was common in the 1930s.

In the US, guest ranches are now a long-established tradition and continue to be a vacation destination.

== Hunting ranches ==
Some guest ranches cater to hunters. Some feature native wildlife such as whitetail deer, mule deer, bison or elk. Others feature exotic species imported from other regions and nations such as Africa and India. While many traditional ranches allow hunters and outfitters on their land to hunt native game, the act of confining game to guarantee a kill as practiced on some ranches is controversial and considered unsporting (see fair chase).

The introduction of non-native species on ranches is more controversial because of concerns that these "exotics" may escape and become feral, modify the natural environment, or spread previously unknown diseases. Advocates of hunting ranches argue in turn that they help protect native herds from over-hunting, provide important income for locals and nature conservation, and that the stocking of exotic species actually increases their numbers and may help save them from extinction.

== See also ==
- Dude Ranchers Association, a trade association founded in 1926
- Farm stay
