= Trinidad Swilling =

Arizona pioneer (1849–1925)

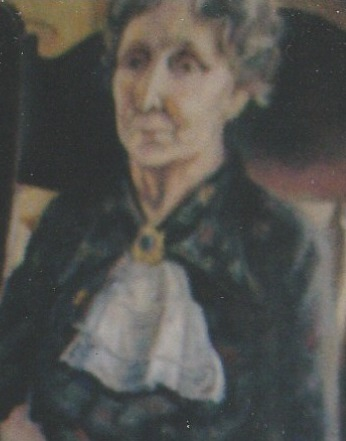
- Trinidad Escalante Swilling-Schumaker "Mother of Phoenix, Arizona"
- Born: Trinidad Mejia Escalante; April 15, 1849; Hermosillo, Mexico
- Died: December 27, 1925 (aged 76); Phoenix, Arizona, US
- Occupations: Housewife, seamstress
- Known for: "The "Mother of Phoenix"
- Spouse(s): Jack Swilling 1864–1878; Henry Schumaker 1887–1896

Trinidad Swilling Shumaker (Note: This name uses marriage naming customs; the first is the surname of her first husband "Swilling" and the second surname is of her second husband "Shumaker".) (April 15, 1849 – December 27, 1925), known as "The Mother of Phoenix" (Phoenix, Arizona) was a pioneer and the wife of Jack Swilling, the founder of Phoenix. Mrs. Swilling was involved in local civic activities and promoted the public recognition of her husband as founder of Phoenix. She was also involved in dispute which made the local news as to who was the first white woman to settle in the Phoenix townsite. In 1868, Swilling founded the first pioneer home in the Salt River Valley.

== Early years ==
Trinidad Mejia Escalante was born on April 15, 1849, in Hermosillo, Mexico, a city located in the center of the northwestern Mexican state of Sonora. Her father was Ignatus Mejia. Her grandfather was a Spaniard who moved to Mexico during the Spanish Colonial period. Her mother was Petra Escalante, a Mexican national.

Arizona belonged to Mexico until the end of the Mexican–American War in 1848. The Treaty of Guadalupe Hidalgo and the 1853 Gadsden Purchase clearly defined the US–Mexican boundaries and the Mexicans living within the boundaries of the new United States territory became American citizens, This included the relatives of Escalante who lived in Tucson.

In 1864, when her father died, she and her mother migrated to Tucson, in the Territory of Arizona, to be with their relatives. At the time she was 15 years old.

== Marriage to Jack Swilling ==
When she was 17 years old she met John William Swilling better known as Jack Swilling, who happened to be in Tucson. Prior to meeting Escalante, Mr. Swilling, a native of Anderson, South Carolina, was in Los Pinos where he belonged to a militia named the Arizona Guards. The militia's primary objective was to defend the early Anglo settlers against the attacks by the members of the Apache tribes. In 1861, the secession of Confederate Arizona from the Union was officially declared. At that time Mr. Swilling held the rank of First Lieutenant of the militia. The Arizona Guards were absorbed into the Confederate Army.

After the war, Mr. Swilling became involved in gold mining near and around the Prescott area. He met and befriended King S. Woolsey and went to Tucson on a flour-buying trip as a favor to Woolsey. However, when he reached Tucson, he found that the mill, of which he was half-owner, had run out of flour and was forced to wait for a cargo of flour from Hermosillo.

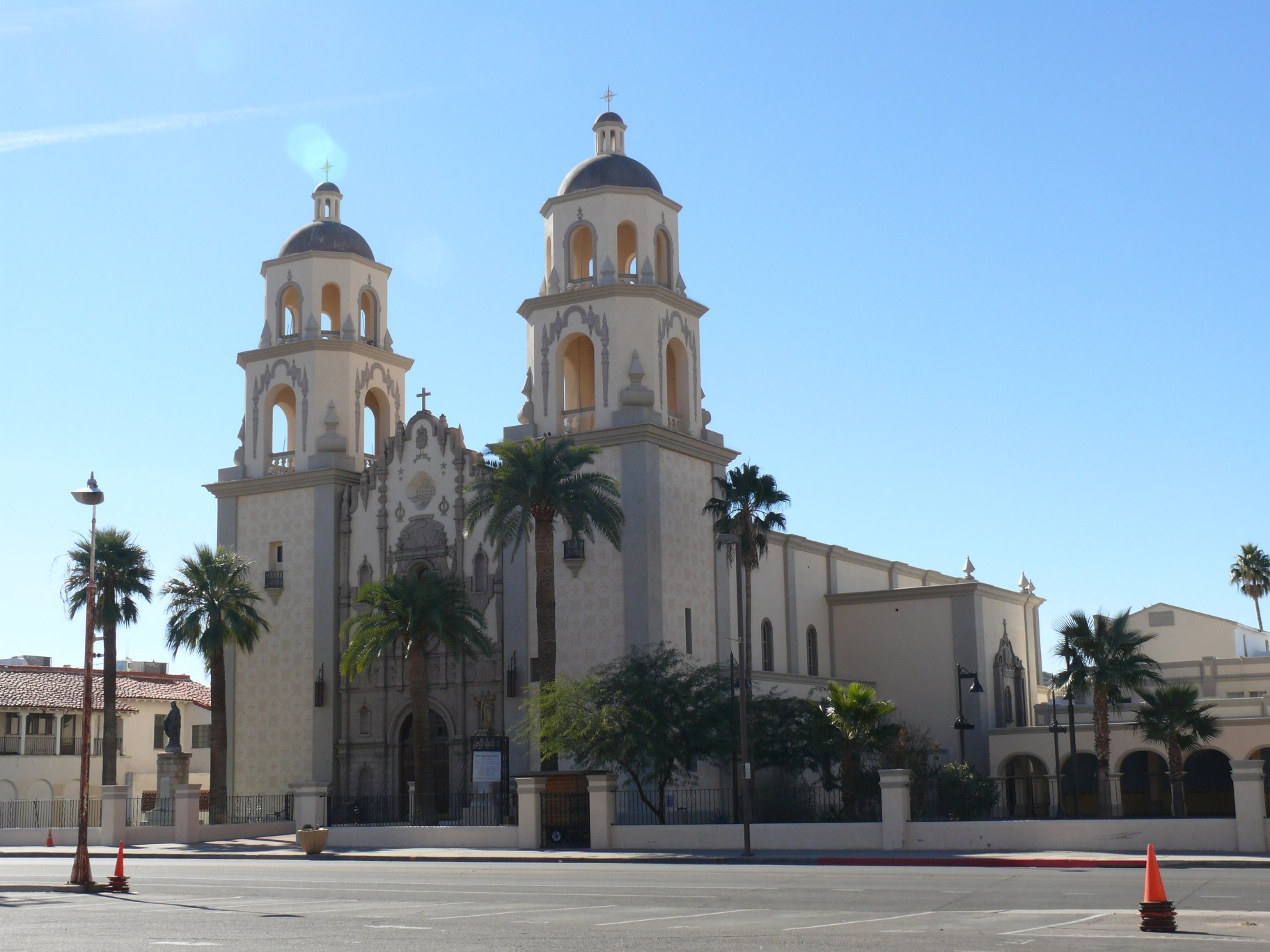
St. Augustine's Cathedral

When Mr. Swilling first saw Escalante, he boasted to his friends that he was going to marry her. Eventually, they met and fell in love. They wanted to get married, however her mother objected, after all Mr. Swilling was 34 years old and Escalante was a young lady of 17 years of age. They then decided to elope. They lived together unmarried in the area of Tucson until April 11, 1864. That day Father Aloysius M. Bosco came to Tucson's St. Augustine's Cathedral, as was his custom, to baptize Mexican children, and to confirm Catholic marriages. Mr. Swilling and Escalante were married. It was a time when there were few white women on the southwestern frontier. It was not unusual for white men to marry Mexican or Native American women for companionship. During the course of their marriage the couple had seven children: Georgia, 1865; Matilda, 1867; Leila (Lilly), 1871; Elizabeth, 1873; Berry, 1874; Matilda Adeline, 1876; and John William Jr., 1878.

The Swillings moved to Yavapai County and established a farm at Walnut Grove where he had a claim on Weaver's Mountains. They lived there for a year and then moved to the town of Wickenburg where they established a farm close to the Hassayampa River which was next to Henry Wickenburg’s place. Mrs. Swilling's mother, Mrs. Mejia, lived with them until her death in 1865. On November 11, 1867, Mr. Swilling founded the Swilling Irrigating and Canal Company in Wickenburg.

In 1867, the Swillings moved once more, this time to the Salt River Valley where Black Canyon City is currently located. Mr. Swilling built a small "Rock House" which Mrs. Swilling described as her "1st House". According to an oral history account made by Mrs. Swilling, Mr. Swilling befriended the Lough family near the town of Gillett, by the junction of the Agua Fria and the New Rivers. The Loughs, who had encountered problems with their wagon and livestock leaving them stranded, received a helping hand from the Swillings. The Lough family joined the Swillings and headed to the Salt River Valley. Mrs. Swilling recalled being the first Mexican women in the Phoenix townsite, and that her friend, "Mrs. Lough" was the first white woman in Phoenix.

== Founding of Phoenix ==
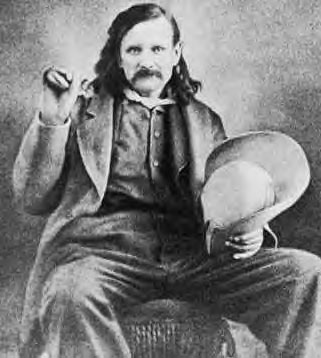
Jack Swilling

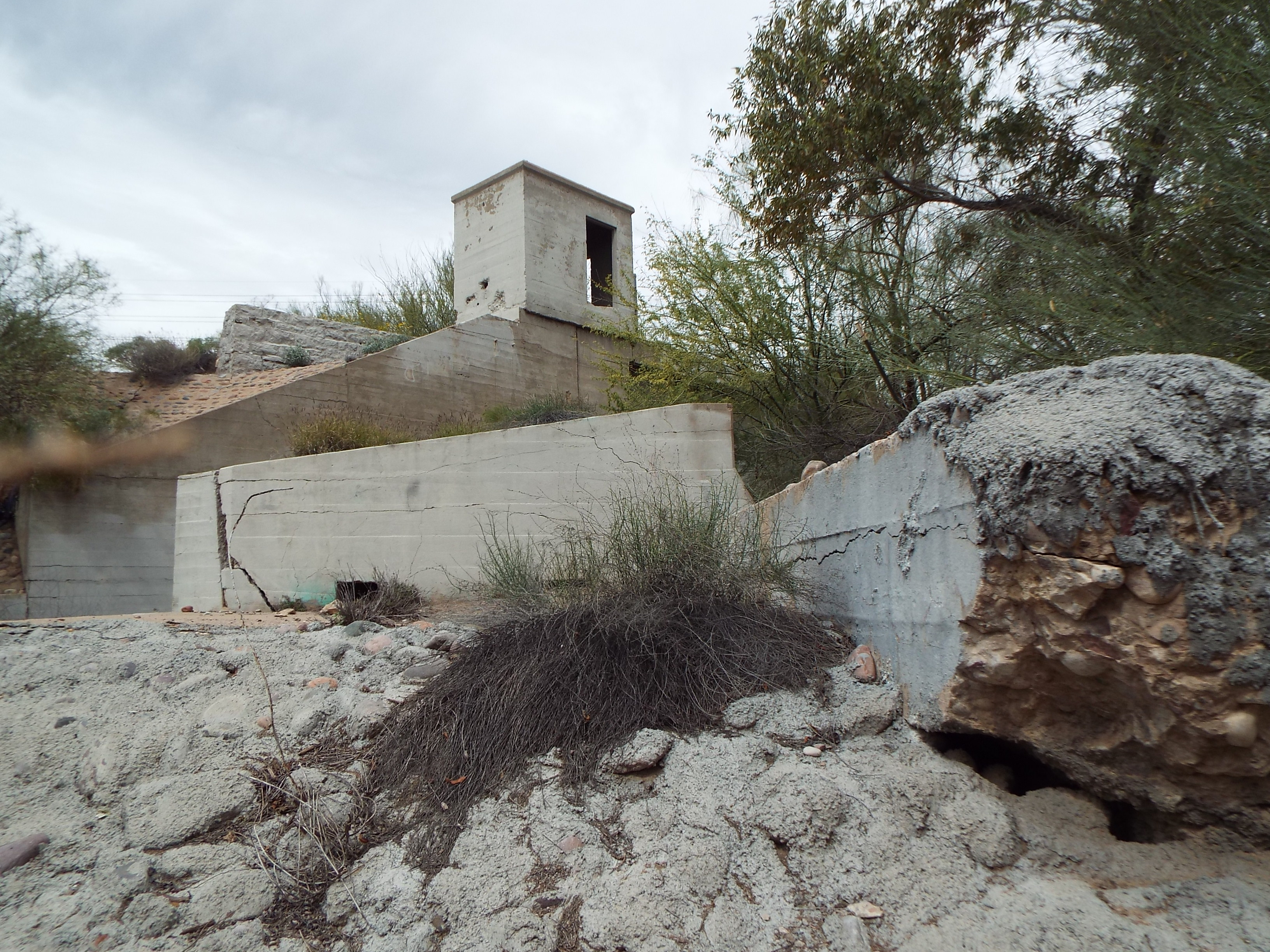
Ruins of the Joint Head Dam.

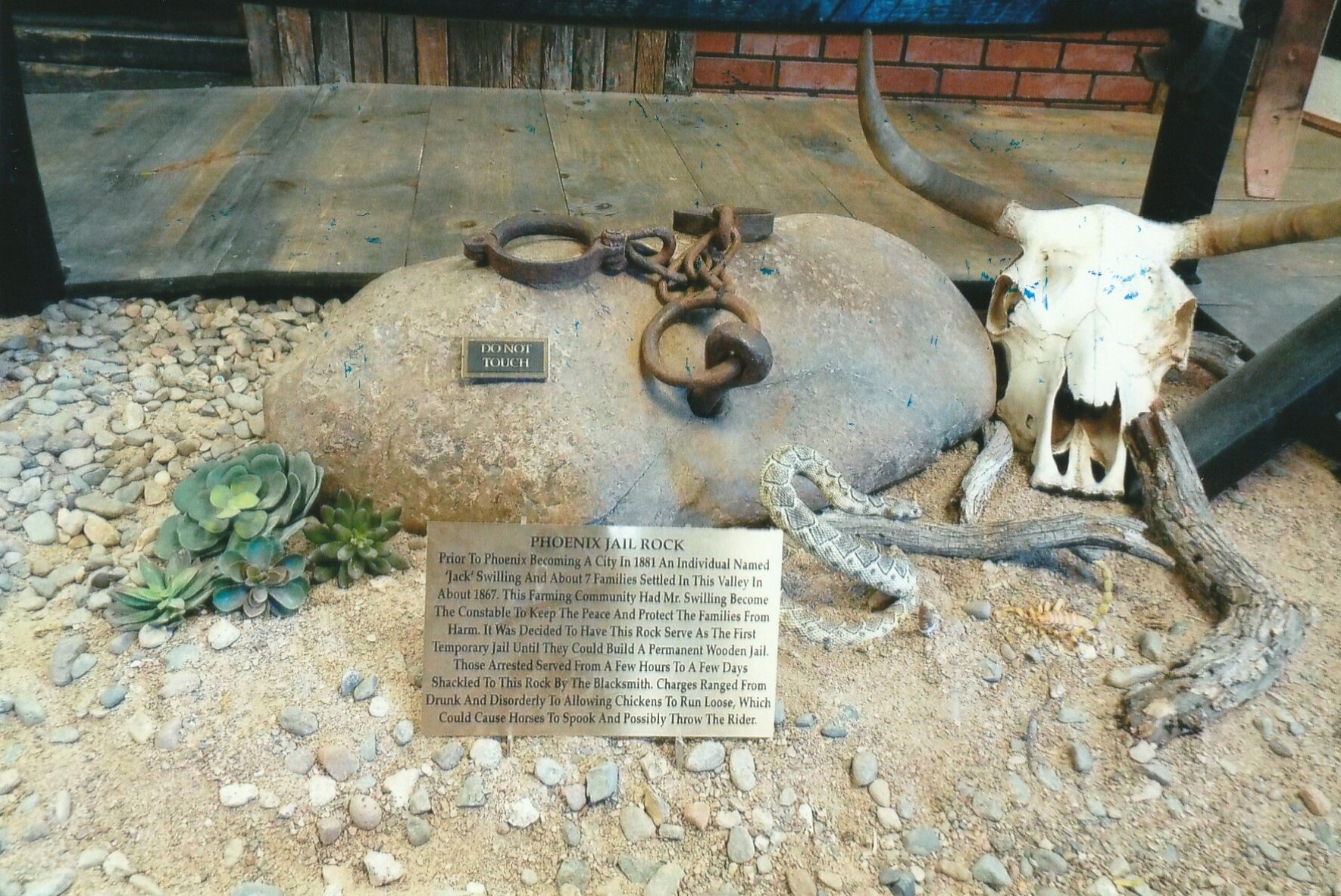
The Jail Rock which Swilling used to shackle and restrain prisoners

The Swilling Irrigating and Canal Company founded by Mrs. Swilling's (as Escalante was referred to) husband had 16 investors which included Phillip Darrell Duppa (known as Lord Duppa) and Bryan Phillips. They had a modern canal system dug with the help of Mexican laborers, enabling a dependable delivery of water. The canal diverted water from the Salt River to irrigate farm lands in what would eventually become the town of Phoenix. The canal, which became known as "Swilling's Ditch," was successful. In 1884, the Joint Head Dam was built in the location where Jack Swilling began to build his ditch and where the Salt River is located.

The Swillings claimed 160 aces in what currently is 32nd Street and Van Buren in Phoenix. There they established a farm which included an orchard and a vineyard and the Swillings became economically prosperous. They built a 10-room house which often served as a community meeting place. It was in their house that the first Catholic Mass was held in Phoenix. Father Edward Gerard of Florence would often come to Phoenix via a horse-drawn wagon to hold Catholic services at their home.

Mr. Swilling established a mill and wanted to establish a new settlement called "Pumpkinville" in the vicinity of his mill, known as the Swilling Mill. A debate ensued over the naming of the new settlement. Among the other names which were suggested were "Stonewall", after Stonewall Jackson, and Salina.

The decision was hotly contested between two sites: the original settlement around Swilling's farm, and a site about a mile to the west, which was supported by the newly founded "Salt River Valley Town Association" (SRVTA). Due to economic considerations benefitting the members of SRVTA, the more westerly townsite was selected, and a 320 acres (1.3 km^{2}) plot of land was purchased in what is now the downtown business section. The will of others prevailed and he sided in the founding of the city at its present location.

It is commonly believed that Lord Duppa proposed the name of Phoenix relating back to the story of the mythical Phoenix's rebirth from the ashes. The basis being the rebirth of a city of canals, rebuilt on the site of the ancient Hohokam prehistoric canal systems that dated back to about 700–1400 AD. Mr. Swilling was elected Justice of the Peace for the Phoenix Precinct and was Phoenix's first postmaster. This earned Mr. Swilling the title "the Father of Phoenix" and Mrs. Swilling the title "the Mother of Phoenix." In 1868, Mrs. Swilling founded the first pioneer home in the Salt River Valley.

== Jack Swilling's death ==
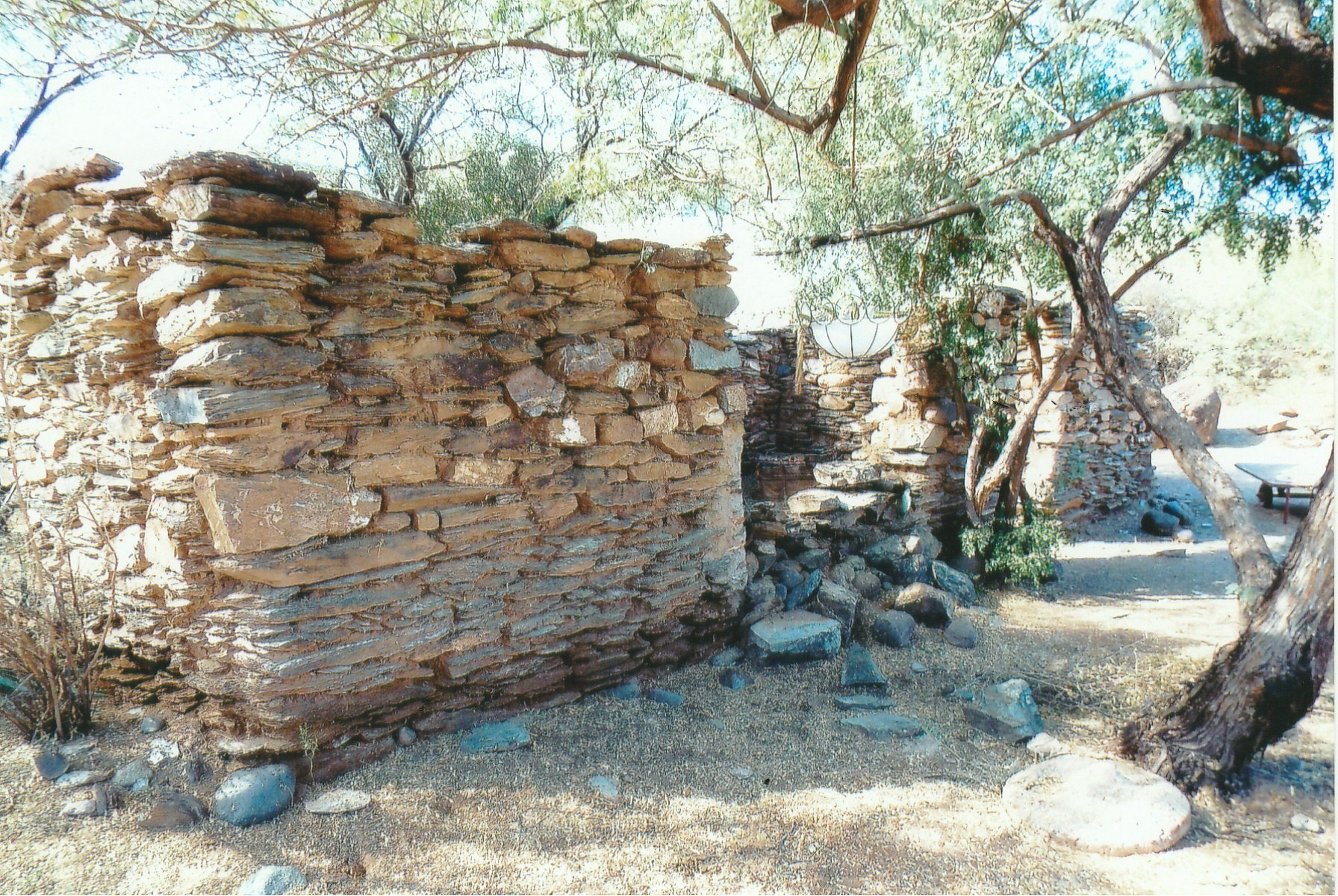
Ruins of the Swilling residence in Black Canyon City.

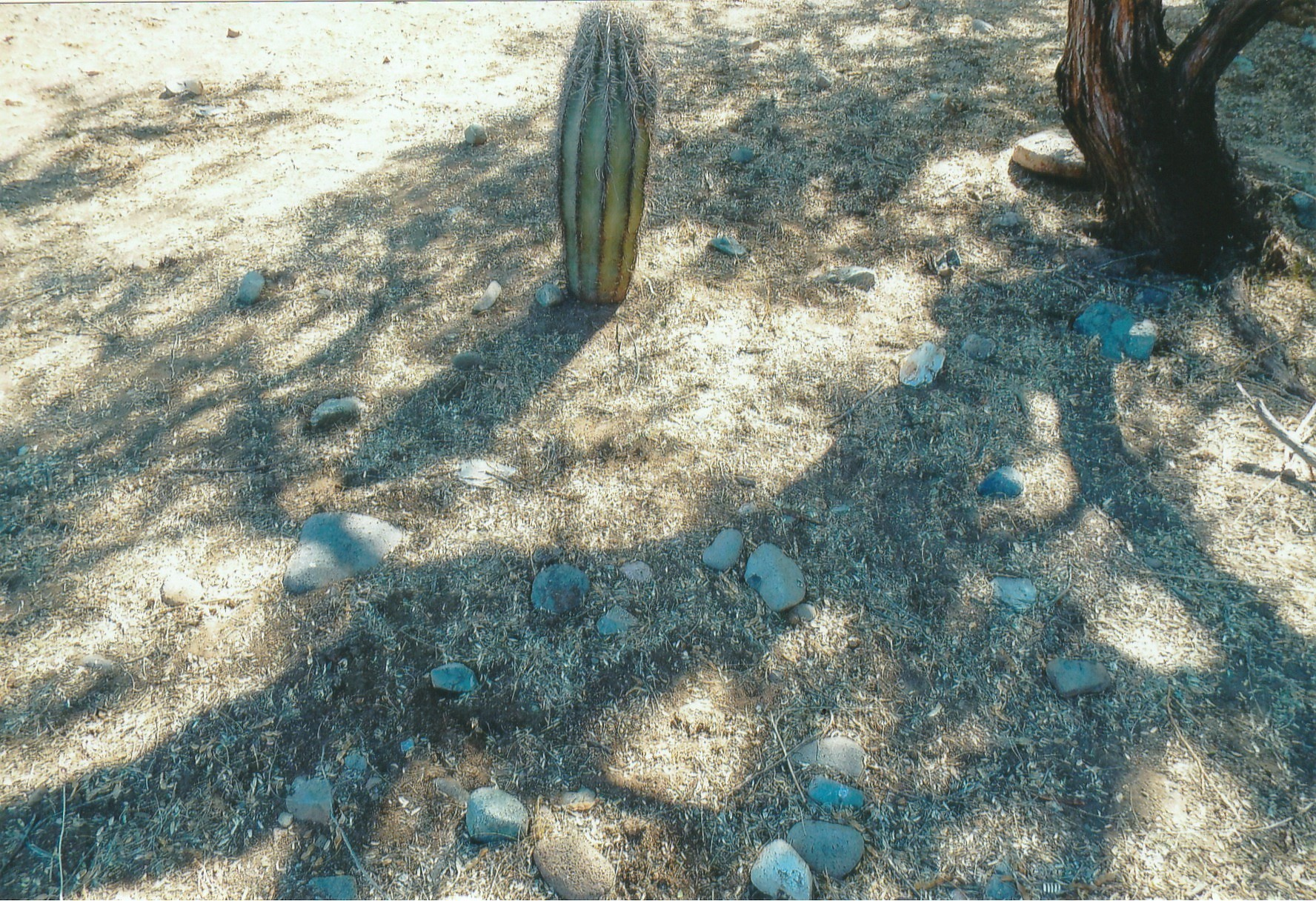
Location of the grave of Col. Snively in the Swilling Ranch.

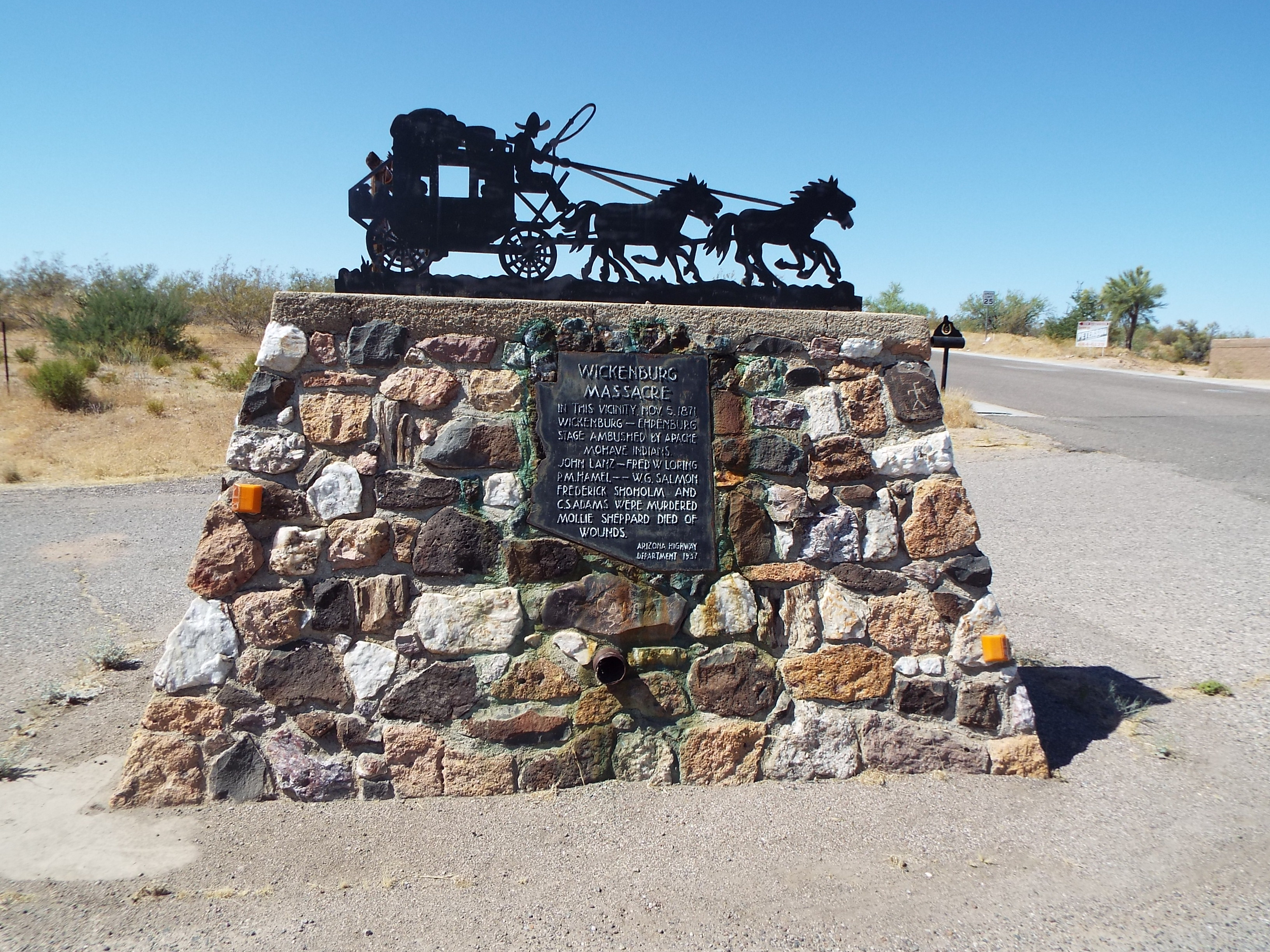
Vicinity marker where the Wickenburg Massacre took place.

Mr. Swilling continued prospecting in the Bradshaw Mountains. The family moved to Gillett where they owned various businesses. Among the businesses that the Swillings had an active interest in was the "Gillett Real Estate" where they sold lots ranging from $100 to $250 depending on the location, a cattle and horse ranch and a vegetable farm in partnership with L.A. Stephens. The Swillings later moved to Black Canyon City where they built a stone house and established a farm. He organized a party which built an irrigation ditch from the Aqua Fria River to their property. This provided the water he needed to raise cattle. Their house became a popular stagecoach stop and resting place for those who traveled from Prescott to Phoenix.

In the spring of 1878, word reached the Swillings that Colonel Jacob Snively, a family friend, had been killed by the Apaches in the Wickenburg Mountains near the peak called White Picacho. Mrs. Swilling suggested that Mr. Swilling and two companions, which included Andrew Kirby and George Monroe, founder of Castle Hot Springs, go on a trip to recover and rebury the remains of their old friend.

On April 17, Mr. Swilling and his two companions went on their Snively exhumation trip. Mr. Swilling and his companions returned to Gillett after exhuming Col. Snively's remains at White Picacho Mountains on April 23. He was seen walking the streets of Gillett with a bag or sack containing the remains of Col. Snively. Mr. Swilling buried the bones of Col. Snively on his property next to his house.

Three hooded men, one tall, one medium-size, and one short, robbed a stagecoach near Wickenburg. Six men, including the driver, were shot and killed. Among them was Frederick Wadsworth Loring, a young writer from Boston who had been sent as a correspondent for Appleton's Journal. The incident became known as the Wickenburg Massacre. On one occasion Mr. Swilling and his friends were in a bar discussing the incident and the description of the murderers, Mr. Swilling jokingly mentioned that he and his friends matched the description. Mr. Swilling and his companions became suspects in the robbery.

Pima County Sheriff Wiley W. Standefer arrested Mr. Swilling and Andrew Kirby. They were eventually turned over to Deputy U.S. Marshal Joseph W. Evans so that the state could charge them in the federal courts. Evans escorted them to the Yuma Territorial Prison, a federal jail. Prior to his arrest Mr. Swilling had developed a habit of using of a combination of narcotics and liquor to relieve the pain caused by old injuries, thus he was not very healthy. The sanitary conditions inside the prison in Yuma were terrible. The terrible prison conditions combined with the August heat, aggravated Mr. Swilling's chronic ill health. According to written documentation by Mrs. Swilling, her husband was released from the federal prison because of his health. He was released to the Hodges family, friends of the Swillings, and died in their home. The Hodges family owned two lots in the Yuma Cemetery behind the old Catholic Church, and Swilling was buried in one of them. A headstone now marks what was once an unmarked grave. The real culprits of the massacre were caught, proving his innocence too late.

== Marriage to Henry Schumaker ==
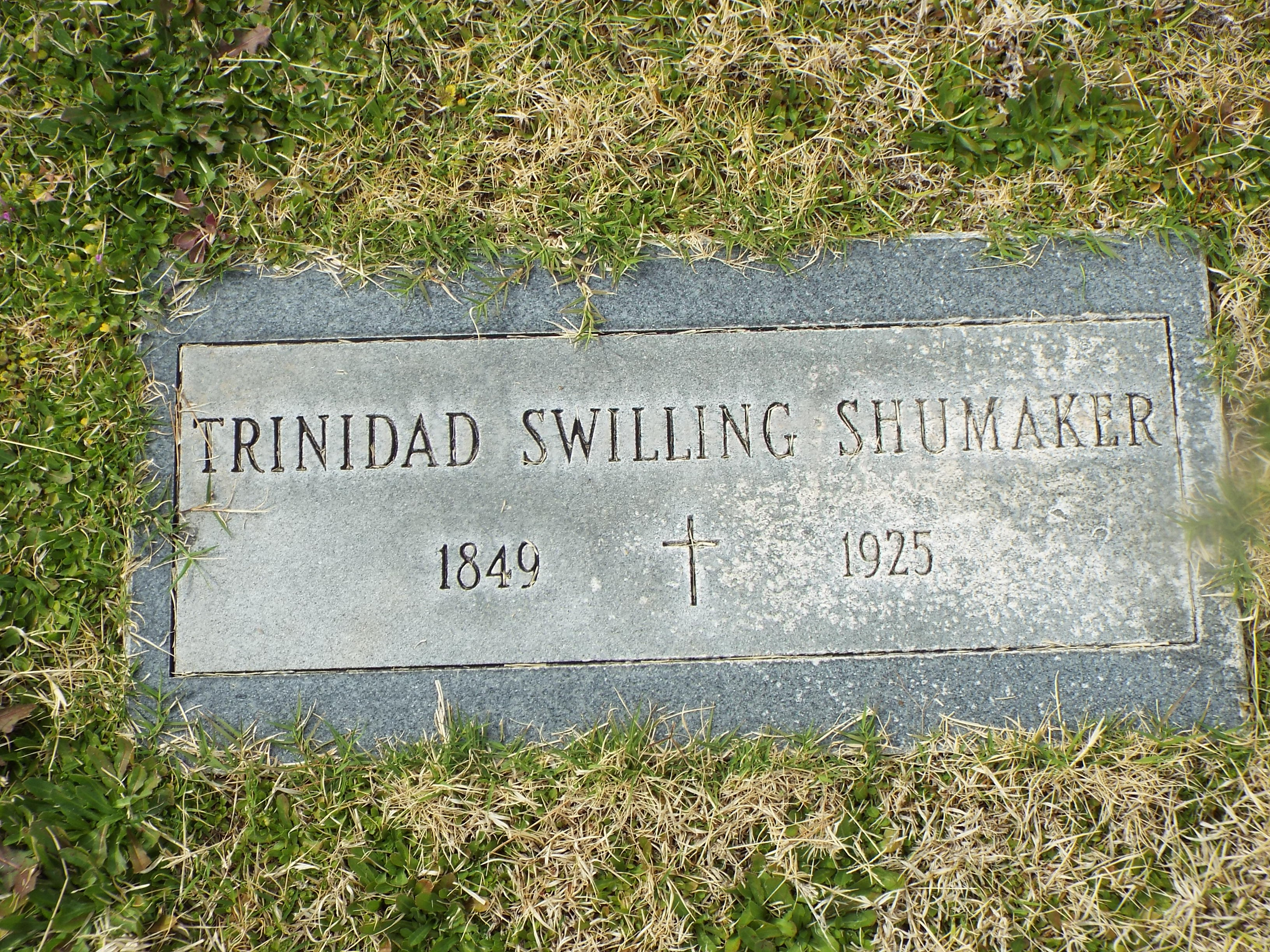
Grave of Trinidad Swilling Schumaker

After Mr. Swilling died, Mrs. Swilling returned to Gillett for a few months and subsequently sold her holdings in that town and moved to Phoenix in 1879. She was in a bad financial situation after Mr. Swillings' death and was destitute when she arrived in Phoenix. She found work as a seamstress to support her children. She met Henry Schumaker, a German immigrant and on September 28, 1887, she married him (she was then referred to as Mrs. Schumaker). Together they had three children. Henry Shumaker committed suicide on March 11, 1896. He was buried in the City Loosley Cemetery which is located inside the Pioneer and Military Memorial Park.

Mrs. Schumaker donated her mother's rosary, prayer book and a lace shawl to the Arizona Museum. Mrs. Schumaker also donated to the museum a rifle which once belonged to Mr. Swilling and whose name had been engraved by the makers.

In her later years Mrs. Schumaker was involved in a dispute as to who was the first white woman in Phoenix. According to Mrs. Schumaker:

"I was the first one here, but they don’t call Mexicans white. I came from Sonora, and they call me Mexican"

The dispute made the local news and several early settlers rushed to support her and the Phoenix newspapers stated:

"although of Mexican birth, is white of face and heart."

On one occasion Mrs. Ethel Clark, who was the chairwoman of the Historic Spots and State Historian of the Daughters of the American Revolution and Mrs Schumacher were out at the Park of the Four Waters together. Among the subjects which they discussed was the responsibility that Mrs. Clark took upon herself for having the body of Charles Debrille Poston moved in 1925, from a cemetery in Phoenix to Poston's Butte in Florence, Arizona. That was when Mrs. Schumacher told Mrs. Clark

""You promised me the Daughters of the American Revolution. would do something for my husband."

Mrs. Clark then reaffirmed her promise that the Maricopa Chapter of the D. A. R. would do something in memory of Jack Swilling.

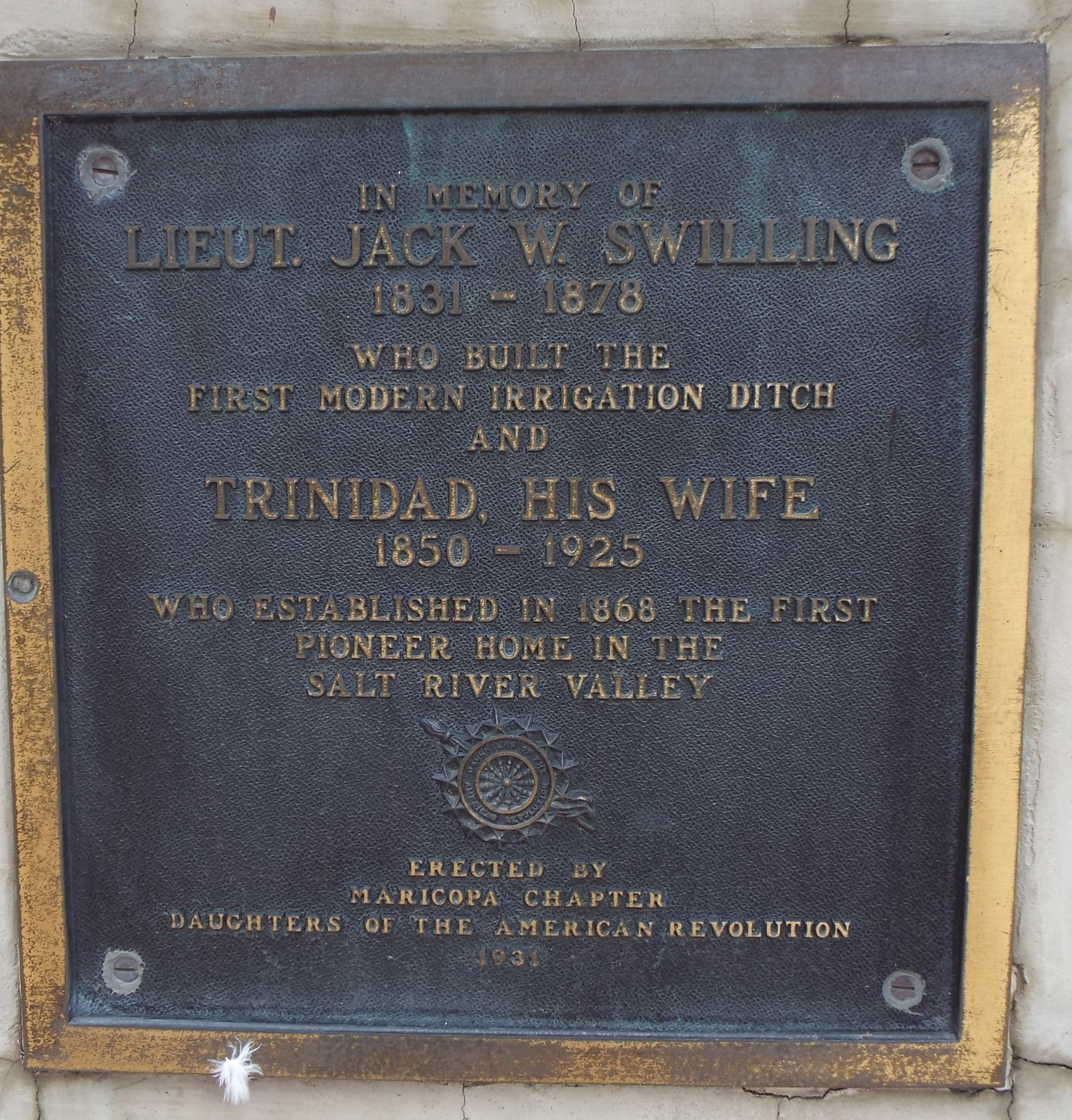
The Jack and Trinidad Swilling plaque

On December 27, 1925, Trinidad Swilling Schumaker died in her home in Phoenix of liver cancer. Her funeral services were held in the Saint Mary's Basilica and she was buried in St. Francis Catholic Cemetery in Phoenix.

On Thursday afternoon, February 19, 1931, the Maricopa Chapter of the Daughters of the American Revolution, in a simple ceremony with the presence of Arizona Governor George W. P. Hunt, unveiled and dedicated to the memory of Jack and Trinidad Swilling, a fountain which stands in the park directly in front of the courthouse building in Phoenix. The fountain has a small bronze plaque with the following inscription

"In memory of Lieut. Jack W. Swilling, 1831–1878, who built the first modern irrigation ditch, and Trinidad, his wife, 1850–1925, who established in 1868 the first pioneer home in the Salt River Valley."

== See also ==
- History of Phoenix, Arizona
- St. Francis Catholic Cemetery
- History of Arizona
- List of historic properties in Black Canyon City, Arizona

=== Arizona pioneers ===
- Mansel Carter
- Bill Downing
- Henry Garfias
- Winston C. Hackett
- John C. Lincoln
- Paul W. Litchfield
- Joe Mayer
- William John Murphy
- Wing F. Ong
- Levi Ruggles
- Sedona Schnebly
- Michael Sullivan
- Ora Rush Weed
- Henry Wickenburg
