= Jack Swilling =

American pioneer in the Arizona Territory (1830–1878)

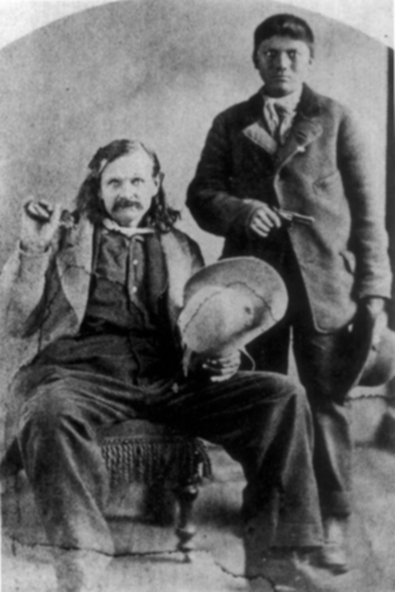
- Jack Swilling with his Apache ward Guillermo Swilling, ca. 1875.
- Born: April 1, 1830; Anderson, South Carolina, U.S.
- Died: August 12, 1878 (aged 48); Yuma, Arizona Territory, U.S.
- Military career
- Allegiance: Confederate States of America
- Branch: Confederate Army
- Service years: 1861–1862
- Rank: First Lieutenant
- Unit: Arizona Guards
- Conflicts: American Civil War; Battle of Pinos Altos; Battle of Stanwix Station; Apache Wars; Bradshaw Mountains Expedition

John W. Swilling (April 1, 1830 – August 12, 1878) was an American pioneer in the Arizona Territory. He is commonly credited as one of the original founders of the city of Phoenix, Arizona. Swilling also played an important role in the opening of the central Arizona highlands to white settlement. His discoveries resulted in a gold rush to the region, and this in turn led to the establishment of Arizona's first territorial capital at the mining town of Prescott.

Swilling was both a Confederate States Army minuteman and a civilian aid to the United States Army during the American Civil War. He worked in a variety of disciplines throughout his life, including as a teamster, prospector, mine and mill owner, and saloon and dance hall owner, as well as a canal builder, farmer, rancher, and public servant. All of this was accomplished while he suffered from periods of excruciating pain resulting from major injuries he suffered in 1854. He took morphine to assuage the pain, which led to dependency problems for the rest of his life.

== Life and career ==
=== Early life ===
John William "Jack" Swilling was born on April 1, 1830, at Red House Plantation, Anderson, South Carolina, to George Swilling and Margaret Farrar Swilling, the eighth of their 10 children. George Swilling was the son of the plantation manager, while Margaret Farrar's father, Thomas Farrar, was the owner. (Incidentally, Thomas Farrar's mother was Judith Jefferson, the sister of Peter Jefferson and aunt to the third president, Thomas Jefferson.) Farrar's parents did not approve of the marriage, so the young couple eloped. It took three years for her parents to accept the match. In time, George Swilling became owner of the plantation. When Jack Swilling was 14, the family moved from South Carolina to Georgia. Three years later he and an older brother enlisted in a mounted battalion of Georgia volunteers for service during the Mexican–American War. After the war, the two young men returned to Georgia. Jack Swilling's whereabouts are unknown for a brief time afterwards, although he was reported in Georgia for the Christmas of 1849.

The next recorded events in his life are his marriage at Wetumpka, Alabama in 1852 to Mary Jane Gray and the birth of their daughter Elizabeth a year later. Swilling wrote in 1854 that he suffered serious injuries—a broken skull and a bullet lodged in his back—in unstated circumstances. Those injuries plagued him for the rest of his life and led to a dependency on drugs and alcohol. In 1856, on his 26th birthday, something happened to cause him to leave permanently for the West. There is more than a year's break in the historical record, but Swilling apparently joined the Leach Wagon Road Company at Fort Smith, Arkansas as a teamster in the summer of 1857, probably staying with the slow-moving oxen-drawn wagon train until its arrival a year later at Mesilla, in Traditional Arizona, which was then part of the New Mexico Territory.

The years between Swilling's arrival in Arizona in 1858 and the founding of Phoenix almost a decade later were active and varied ones. After his arrival in Arizona, Swilling moved to southern California, where he joined in a gold rush near Los Angeles. A few months later he was drawn back to Arizona by the gold rush at Gila City, where he also worked for the Butterfield Overland Mail Company.

=== Apache Wars and the American Civil War ===
He was elected captain of the Gila Rangers militia company that was formed to provide protection from Apache stock raids on the miners and the stage company. The Gila Rangers, with the support of warriors from the friendly Maricopa tribe, made a January 1860 expedition to the unexplored Bradshaw Mountains of central Arizona in pursuit of Apache raiders. The expedition resulted in some noteworthy discoveries: the existence of the Hassayampa River and traces of mineral riches, including gold, in an area that appeared well-suited for ranching and farming. However, the area was too remote and dangerous for settlers at the time.

Soon afterwards, the Gila City gold deposits ran out and Swilling followed his friend Colonel Jacob Snively to Pinos Altos, where he both mined and ran a saloon and dance hall. When the Union Army withdrew from the New Mexico Territory at the beginning of the Civil War, the men of Pinos Altos formed a militia company they named the Arizona Guards for defense against Apache attack. The secession of Confederate Arizona from the Union was officially declared in 1861, a territory which included all of the New Mexico Territory south of the 34th parallel. Swilling was elected second-in-command of the company, or First Lieutenant, and retained that rank when the Arizona Guards were absorbed into the Confederate Army. Swilling likely fought at the Battle of Pinos Altos, a Confederate victory and a battle which killed his commander, Captain Thomas J. Mastin.

After a time spent defending against Apaches and acting as the de facto police force for the area around Pinos Altos, Swilling led a portion of the Arizona Guards that reinforced the garrison of Tucson in 1862. He is believed to have commanded a party of rebels who burned Stanwix Station and skirmished with the Union Army's California Column there in March. He was also involved in the noted incident at White's Mill at Casa Blanca, Arizona when Union Captain James McCleave was captured.

Following the Union's capture of Tucson in May 1862, Swilling's company retreated and he became a civilian employee of the United States Army, first as a dispatch rider between General James Henry Carleton's California Column and Union forces up the Rio Grande, and later as a scout in an anti-Apache campaign. He was involved in the campaign to take Mesilla which ended with a Union takeover of Confederate Arizona's capital. Near the end of that employment, he encountered the Joseph R. Walker exploratory party near Pinos Altos when Swilling led the capture of the famous Apache chief Mangas Coloradas.

=== Further prospecting and marriage ===
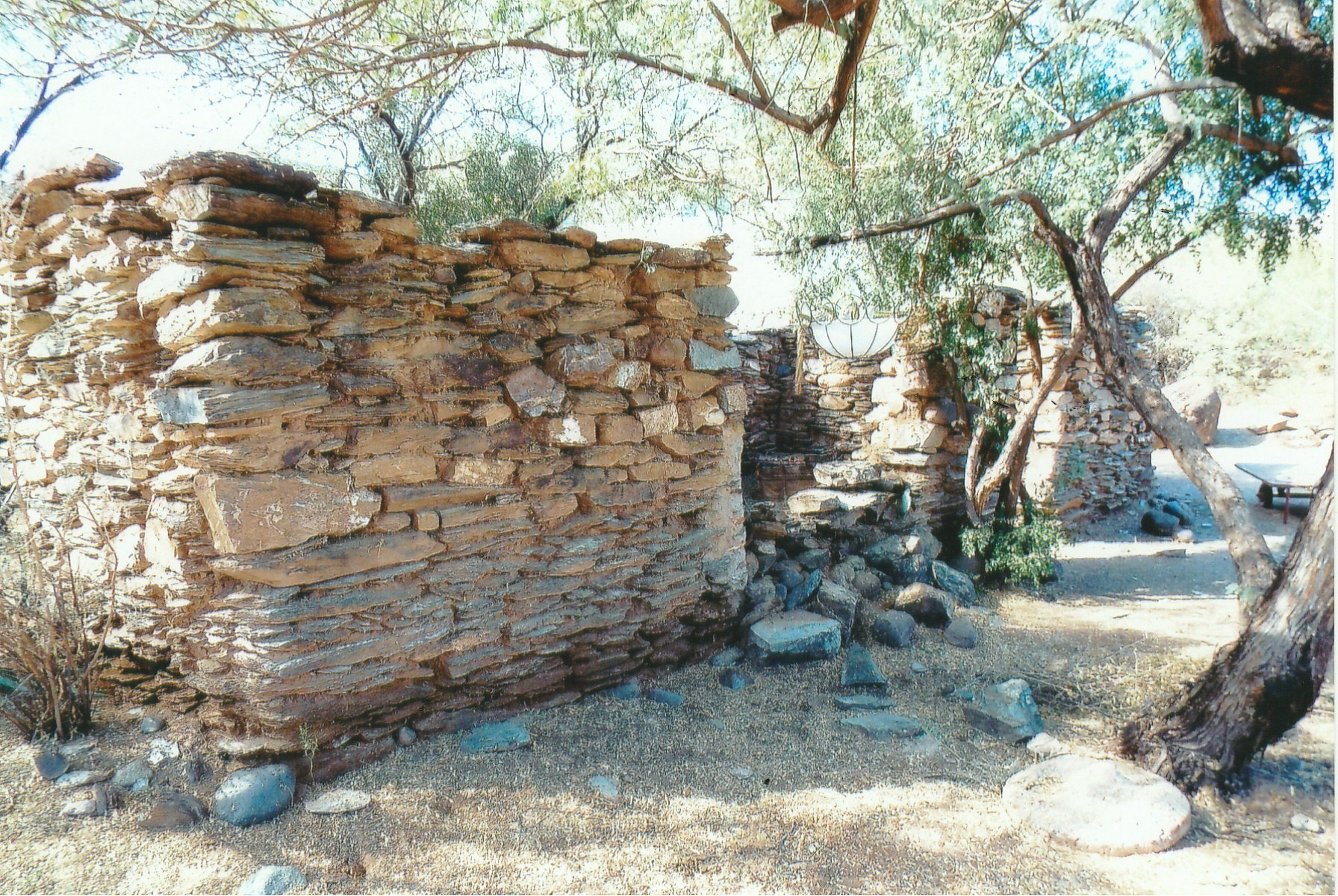
Ruins of the Swilling residence in Black Canyon City.

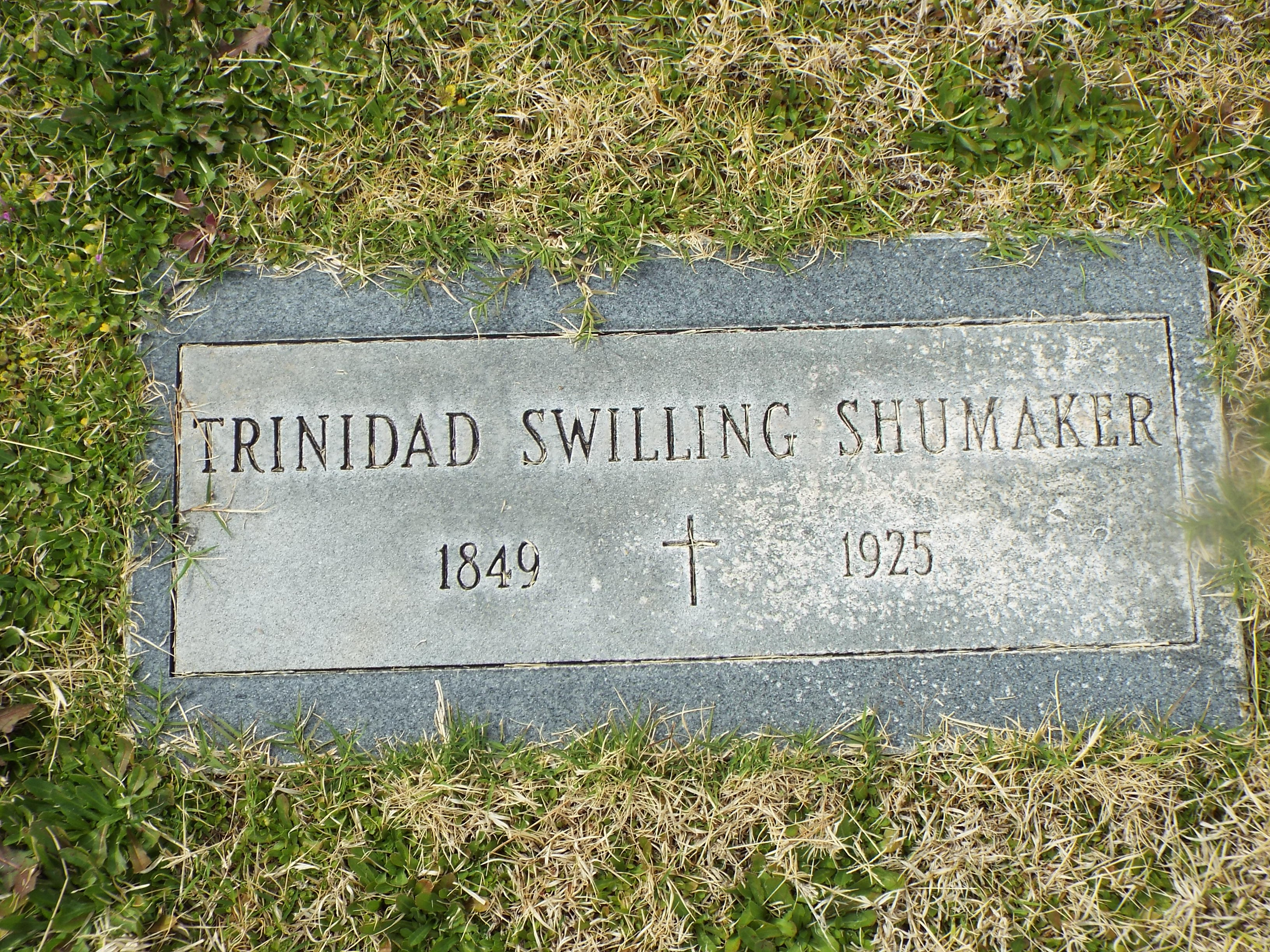
Grave of Jack Swilling's wife, Trinidad Escalante

Swilling's war ended there and he convinced Joseph Walker and his group that there was gold in the central highlands of the new Arizona Territory. He then guided them to where the first Yavapai County mining district was formed, just a few miles south of present-day Prescott, on May 10, 1863. The expedition called it the Pioneer Mining District, and the rules they adopted were the area's first recorded laws.

Swilling left the Walker party shortly after the formation of the Pioneer Mining District and joined up with the exploratory party of Pauline Weaver and Abraham Harlow Peeples (1842–1892), which arrived in the area shortly after the Walker group. He made a small fortune from the unusual surface gold mine at Rich Hill between Wickenburg and Prescott. News of his successes spread eastward when two gold samples from Swilling's claim sent to General James Henry Carleton were forwarded for presentation to President Abraham Lincoln.

Next, Swilling was briefly part owner of a flour mill in Tucson, apparently in partnership with his neighbor Charles T. Hayden. Quickly tiring of Tucson, he returned to Yavapai County where he prospected, owned gold mines and gold milling operations, and farmed. In addition he also was the mail contractor between Prescott and the Pima villages below the Salt River Valley on the Gila River. In the midst of all this activity, Jack Swilling married a young Mexican woman of Spanish heritage named Trinidad Mejia Escalante (1847–1925). They were married on April 11, 1864, at Tucson's San Agustin Cathedral when Trinidad was about seventeen. Over the next fourteen years they had seven biological children, five girls and two boys, and adopted two Apache orphans, a boy and a girl.

=== Swilling Irrigation and Canal Company ===
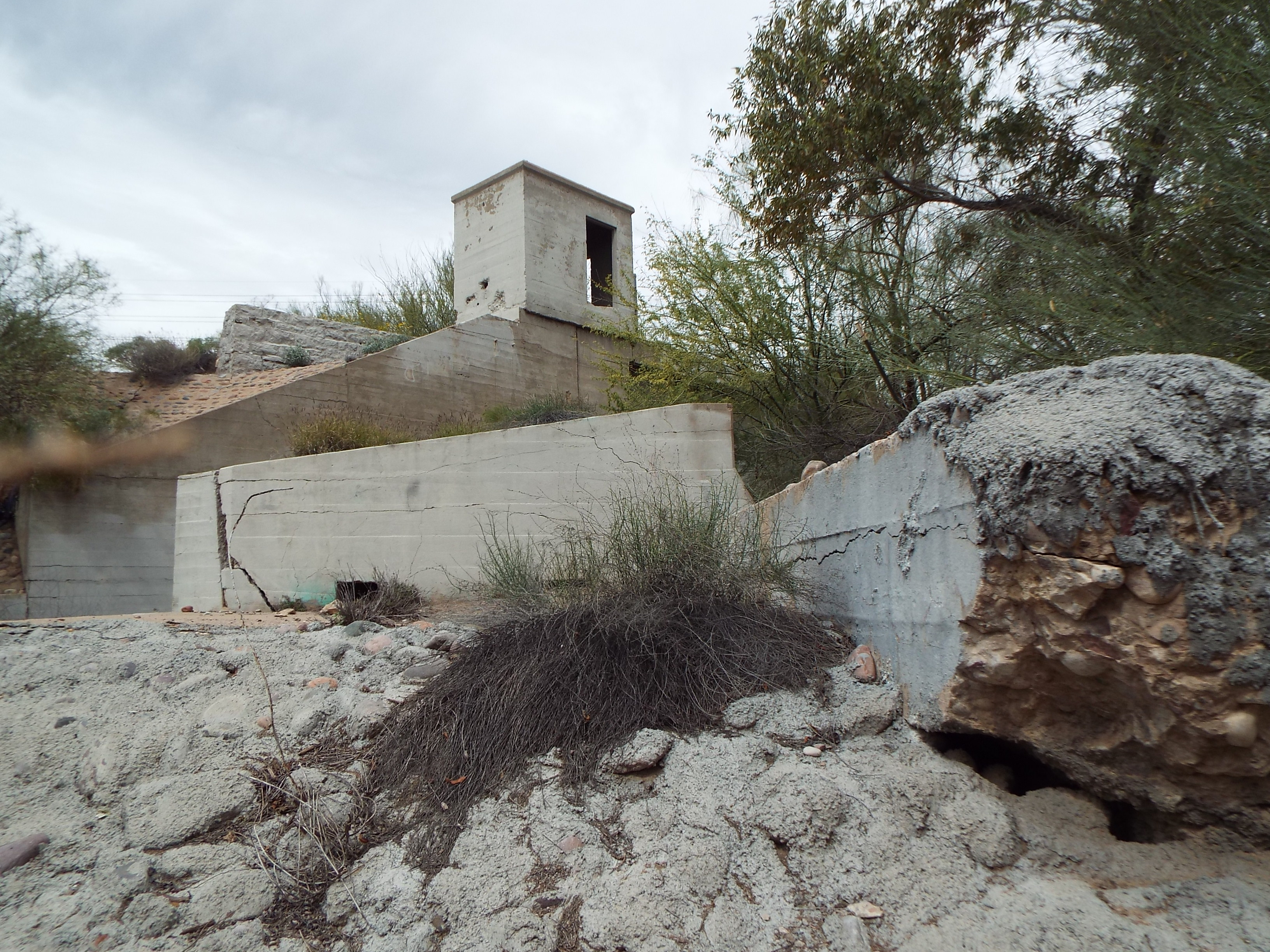
Ruins of the Joint Head Dam which was built in 1884, on the location where Jack Swilling began to build his ditch and where the Salt River is located.

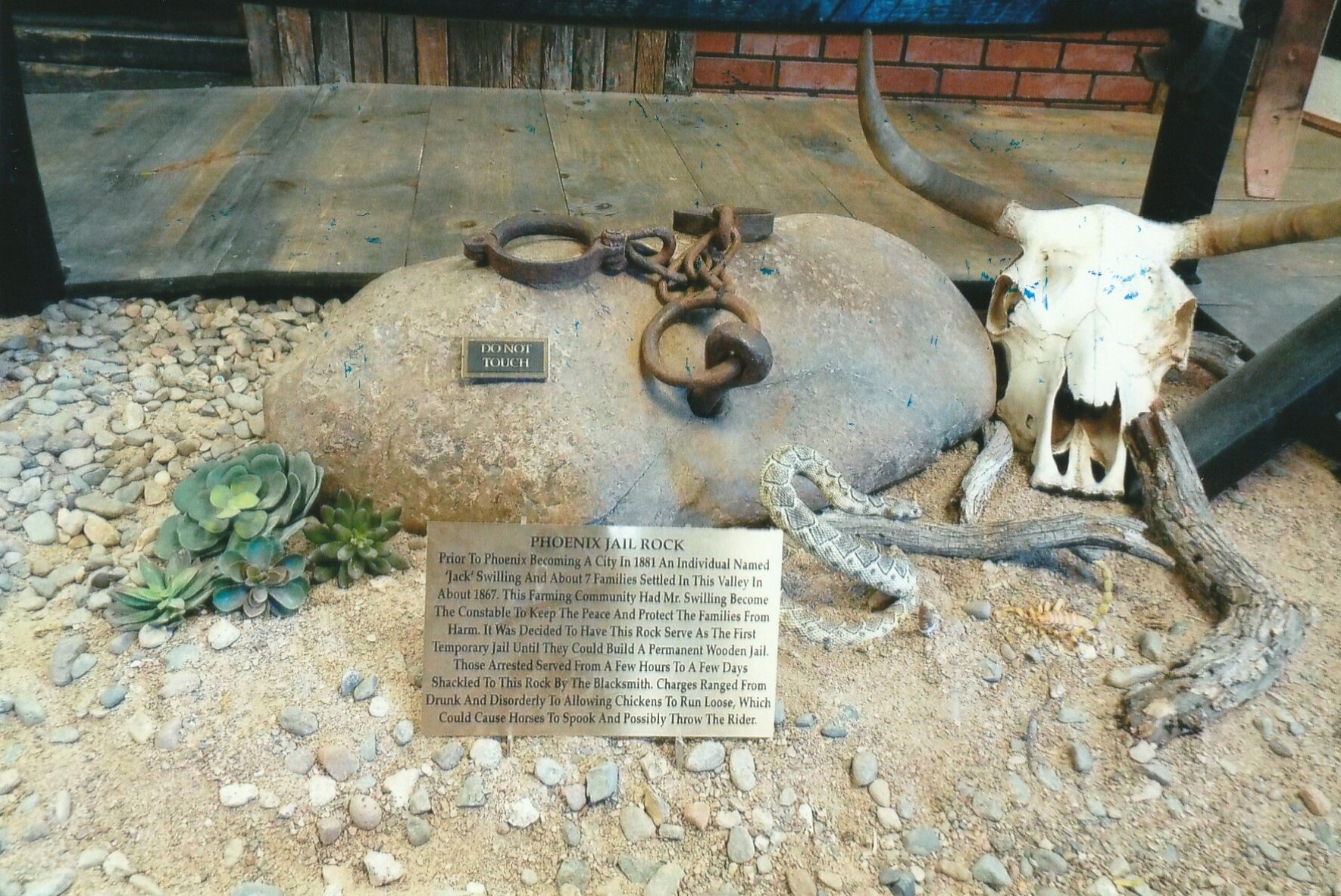
When Swilling was named constable he used this river rock as a temporary jail before the first wooden jail house was built. It served as a leg iron to shackle prisoners.

Jack Swilling had the inspiration to form a canal company which would open the Salt River Valley to farming. On November 16, 1867, he formed the Swilling Irrigating and Canal Company at Wickenburg. Soon after, a small group of men headed by Swilling started construction of the first modern-era irrigation canals in the Salt River Valley; other pioneers and travelers had seen and commented on ancient Hohokam canals in the area, but it was Swilling who organized the first successful modern irrigation project. The following summer, the first crops of wheat, barley and corn were harvested. He promoted the irrigation system, which was in part inspired by the ruins of the Hohokam canals. Swilling Irrigating and Canal Company started the small farming community of Phoenix that has since grown into one of the United States' largest metropolitan areas. Swilling claimed a quarter section south of what became Van Buren Street between 32nd and 36th Streets for his own farm. He built a nine-room, 4,700-square-foot (440 m^{2}) home there. His farm was a local showplace, featuring an artificial pond with tame ducks, a vineyard and an orchard with a variety of fruit trees.

In the early days, Jack Swilling was one of the most prominent leaders of the Phoenix settlement. The first post office was established on June 15, 1868, in Swilling's homestead, with Swilling serving as the postmaster. He was also the first justice of the peace. He was involved in the planning and construction of additional canals, including the first ditch south of the Salt River in partnership with an old acquaintance and business partner, Charles T. Hayden, the founder of Tempe, Arizona and father of long-time Arizona Senator Carl T. Hayden.

=== Death ===
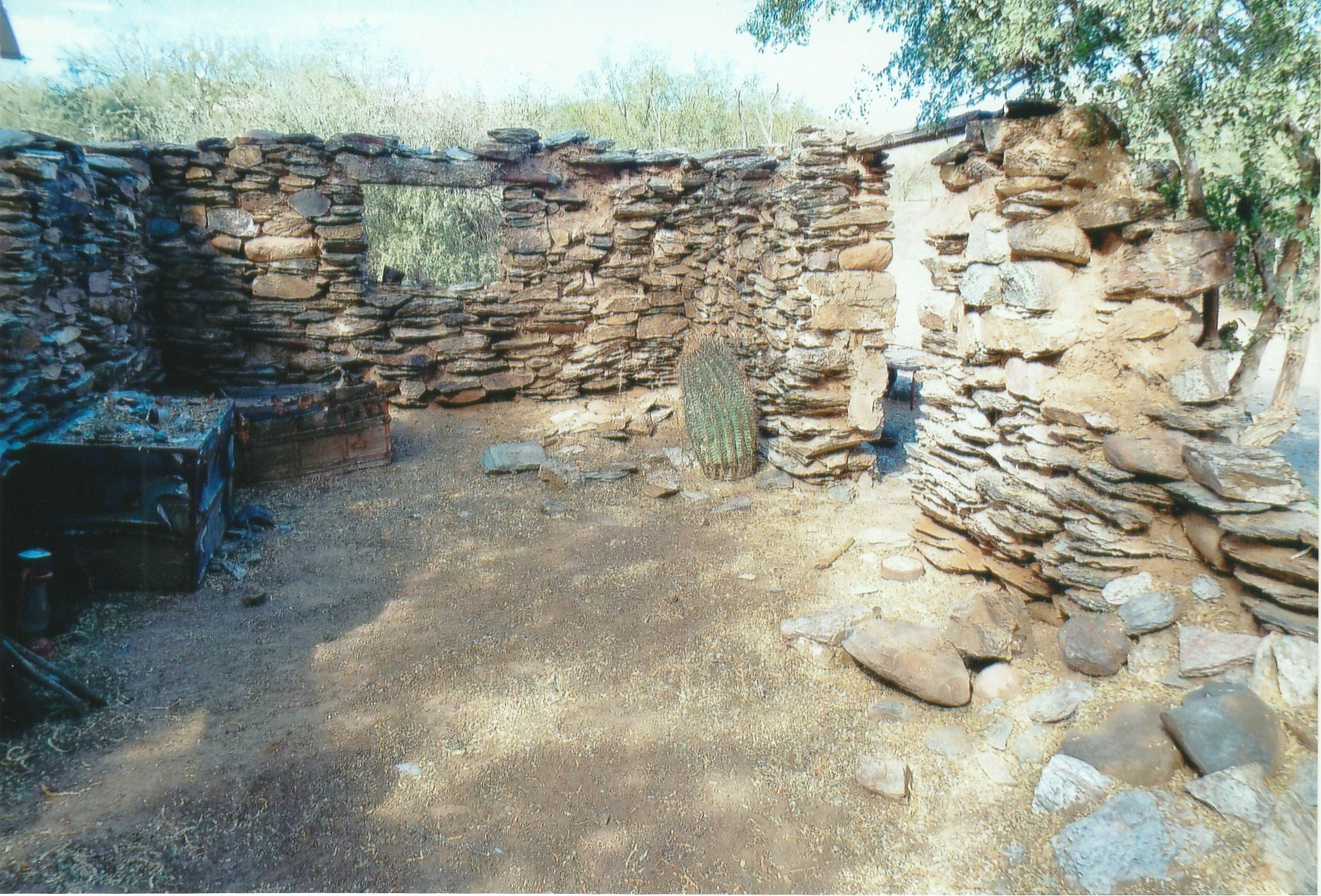
Inside the Swilling residence.

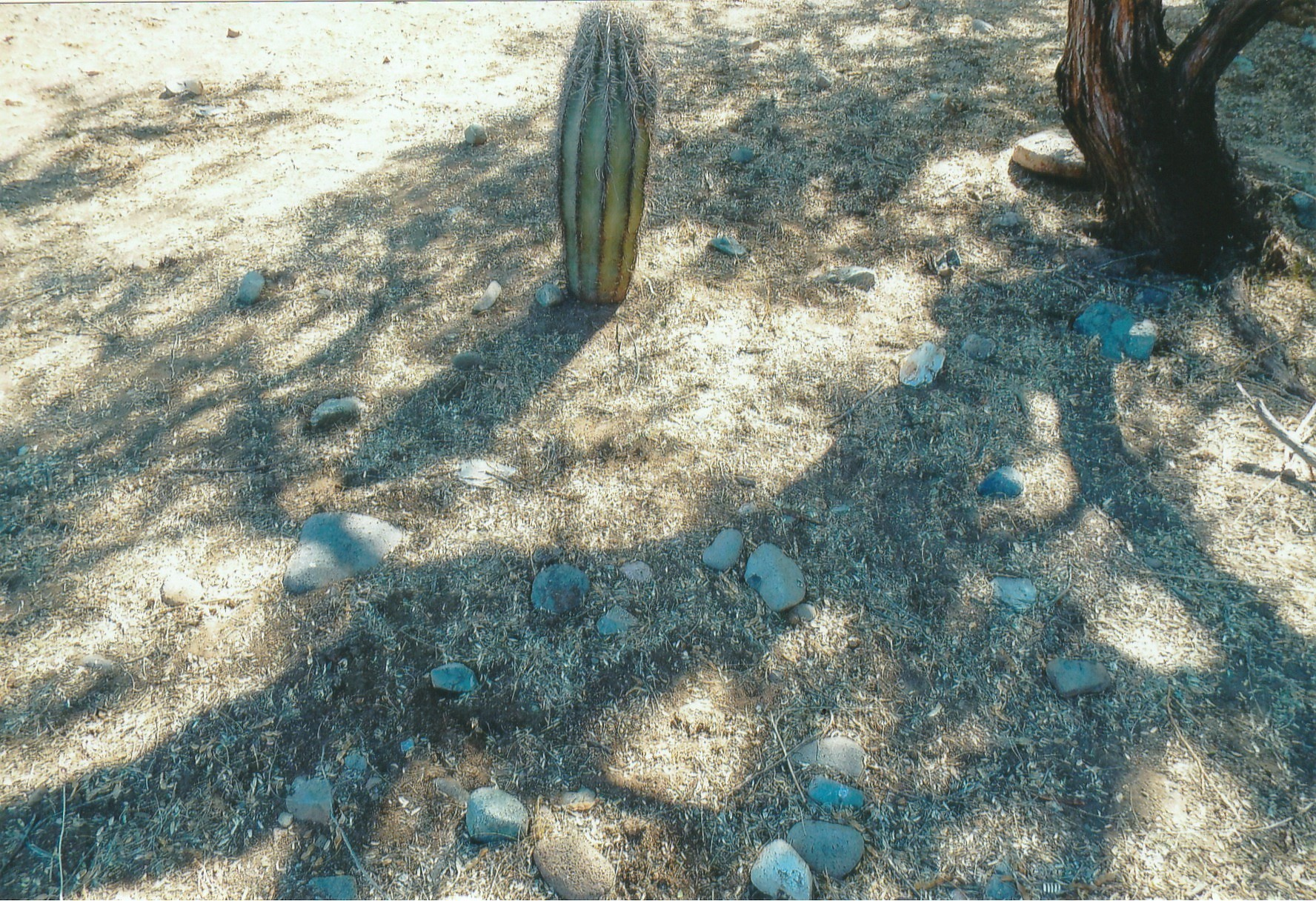
Location of the grave of Col. Snively in the Swilling Ranch.

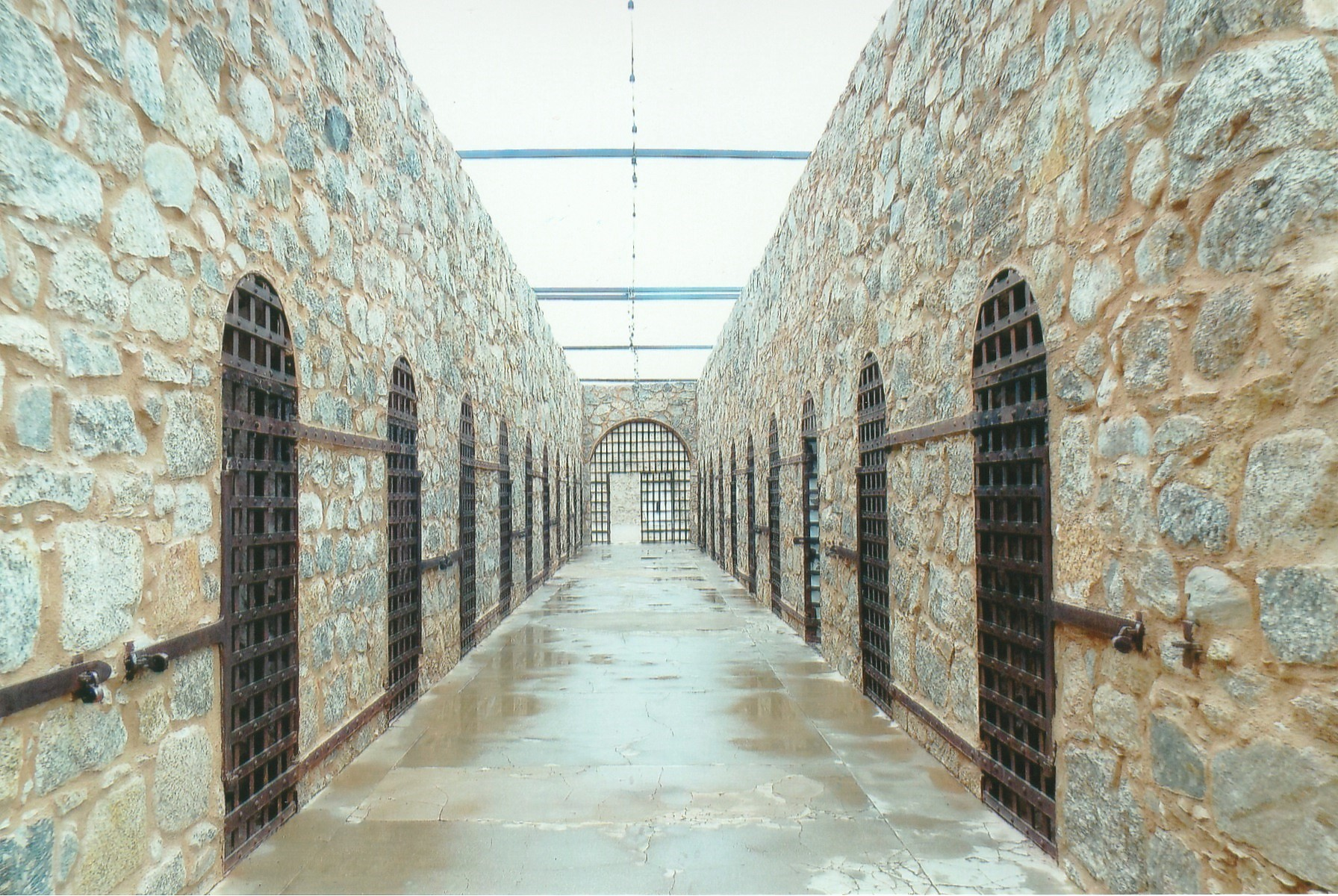
Yuma Territorial Prison

Once Phoenix was well-established and the so-called "original townsite" was located over three miles (5 km) to the west of his holdings, he lost interest and moved his growing family back to central Arizona. There he mined, farmed and ranched until he became a suspect in a stagecoach robbery near Wickenburg.

By the spring of 1878, he and his family were living in the small mining community of Gillett, around the area of Black Canyon City. His health was failing, and his drinking had become a problem. Trinidad Swilling suggested that he go on a trip to recover and rebury the remains of their old friend, Colonel Jacob Snively, who had been killed by Apaches in the Wickenburg Mountains near the peak called White Picacho. While Swilling and two companions were on this journey, three hooded men—one tall, one medium-size, and one short—robbed a stagecoach near Wickenburg. This description matched that of Swilling and his companions and they became suspects in the robbery.

Pima County Sheriff Wiley W. Standefer arrested Swilling and Andrew Kirby, but dropped the state charges so the federal courts could prosecute them and absorb the prosecution costs. Deputy U.S. Marshal Joseph W. Evans brought warrants for the two men to Prescott, where they were turned over to him, and Evans escorted them to the federal jail in Yuma. The sanitary conditions inside the prison at Yuma were very poor and, combined with the August heat plus the fact of his usage of a combination of narcotics and liquor to relieve the pain caused by old injuries ruined Jack Swilling's health further and eventually led to his death. He was released to the Hodges family, friends of the Swillings, and died in their home. The real culprits of the massacre were caught proving his innocence too late. The real robbers—led by a man Swilling and others had publicly accused—were identified only after Swilling's death.

=== Yuma Pioneer Cemetery ===
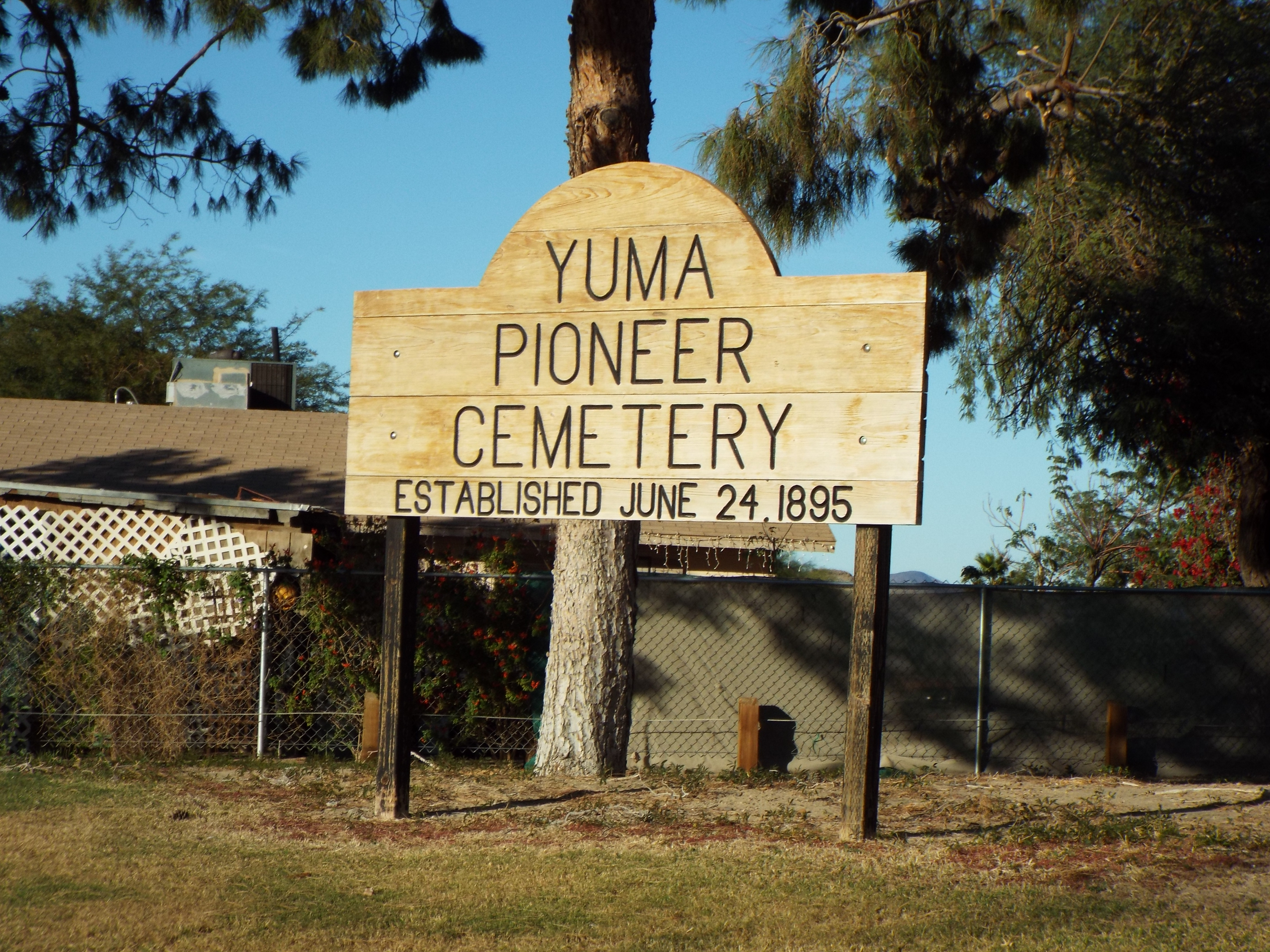
Yuma Pioneer Cemetery

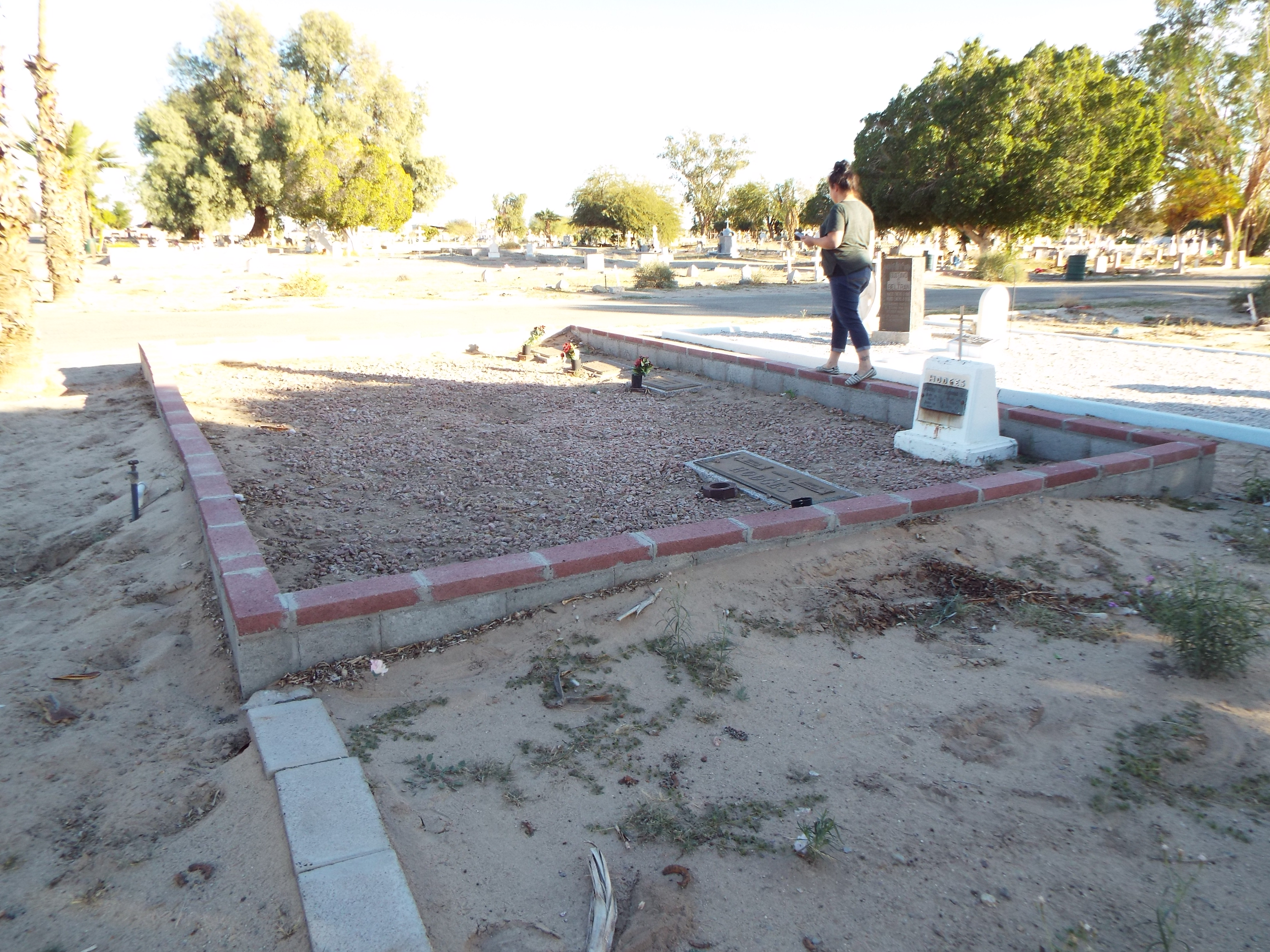
Hodges family plot where Jack Swilling is buried.

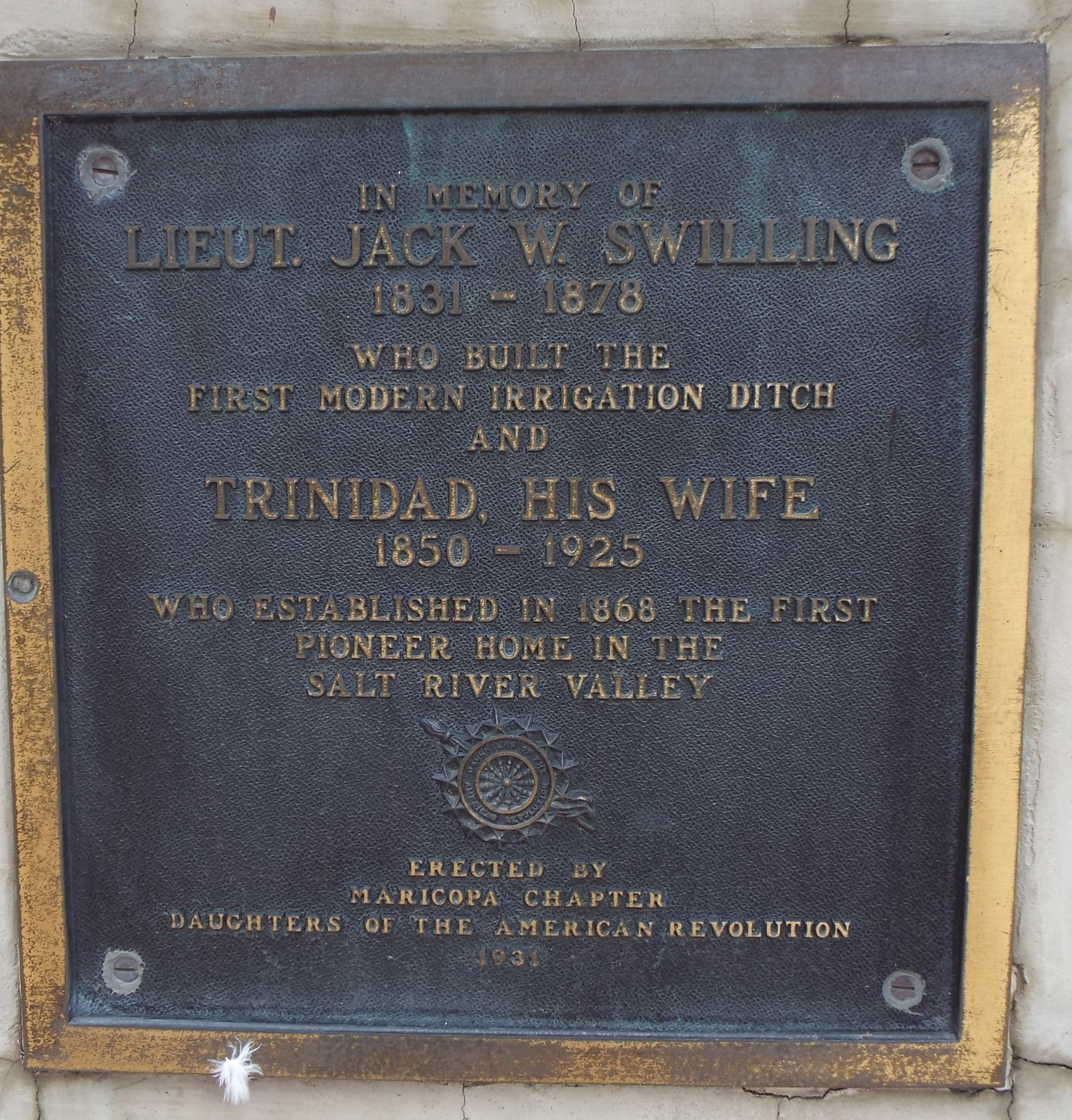
The Jack and Trinidad Swilling plaque on the water fountain

According to the written documents provided by Swillings' wife, Trinidad Swilling, her husband was released to their friends, the Hodges family, who resided in Yuma. She also stated that Swilling died in the Hodges family house. The Hodges family owned two lots in the Yuma Pioneer Cemetery behind the old Catholic Church, and Swilling was buried in one of lots before his family could be notified. A headstone for his grave was once long missing, but has been replaced.

After his death, Swilling's reputation as a badman grew so fast that by the end of the 19th century a prominent Arizona historian described him as a "typical desperado." By many accounts he was a joker and yarn spinner and while drinking he spread tall tales about his exploits to all who would listen. Friends remembered Jack Swilling as an honest, hard-working, and generous man always ready to help those in need of a meal or a place to sleep. He was known to put his own life at risk for others, literally riding to the rescue when help was needed in the face of an Apache attack.

On Thursday afternoon, February 19, 1931, the Maricopa Chapter of the Daughters of the American Revolution, in a simple ceremony with the presence of Arizona Governor George W. P. Hunt, unveiled and dedicated to the memory of Jack and Trinidad Swilling, a fountain which stands in the park directly in front of the courthouse building in Phoenix. The fountain has a small bronze plaque with the following inscription: "In memory of Lieut. Jack W. Swilling, 1831–1878, who built the first modern irrigation ditch, and Trinidad, his wife, 1850–1925, who established in 1868 the first pioneer home in the Salt River Valley."

== See also ==
- Phoenix, Arizona
- List of historic properties in Black Canyon City, Arizona
