= Gillett, Arizona =

Ghost town in Yavapai County, Arizona

- Ghost town
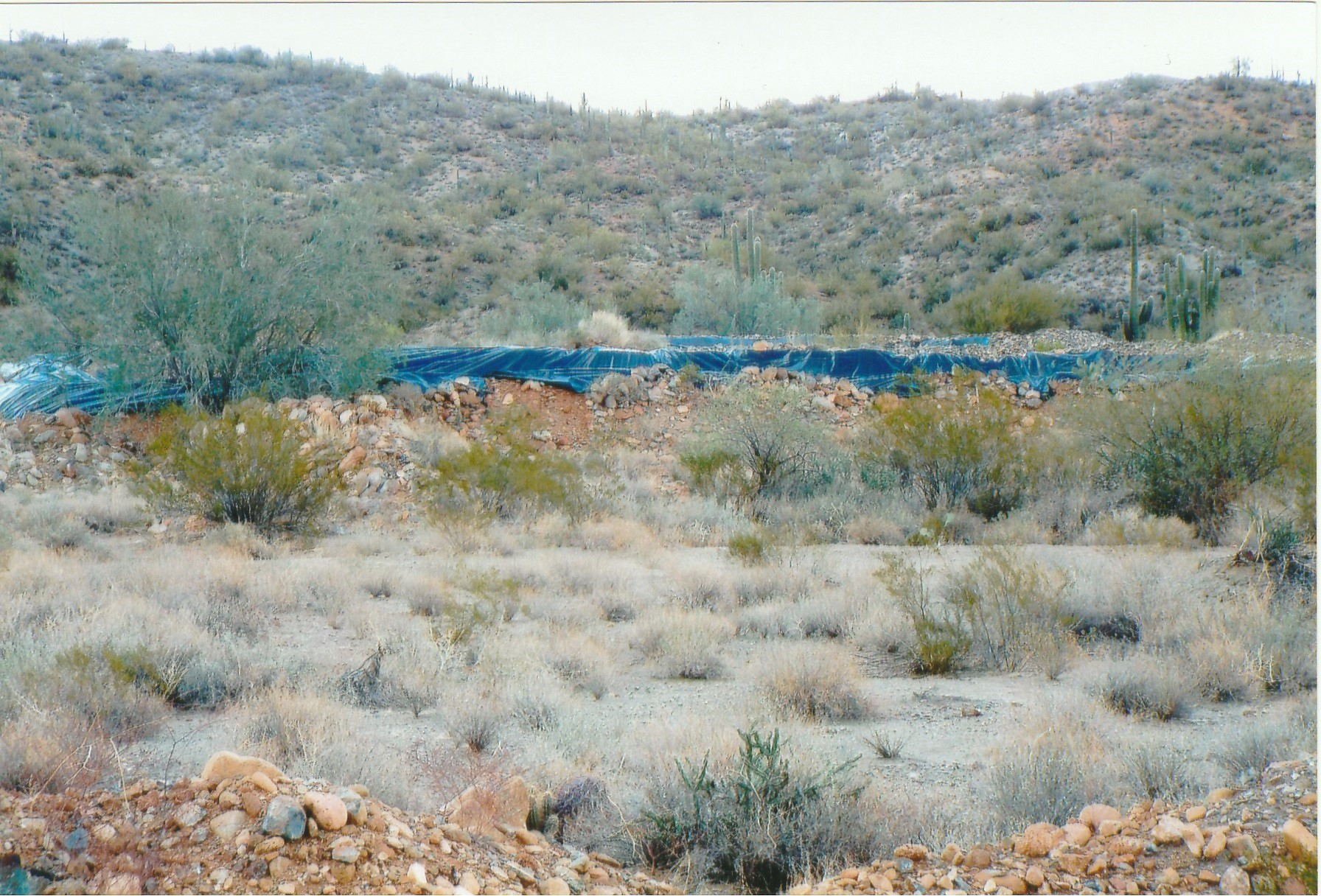
- Location where the town of Gillett once stood.

- Location within Arizona Location within the United States
- Coordinates: 34°01′08″N 112°09′49″W
- Country: United States
- State: Arizona
- County: Yavapai
- Founded: 1878
- Abandoned: 1880
- Elevation: 1,834 ft (559 m)

Population (2009)
  - Total: 0
- Time zone: UTC-7 (MST (no DST))
- FIPS code: 04-27505
- GNIS feature ID: 24431
- Post Office opened: October 15, 1878
- Post Office closed: August 11, 1887

Gillett (the name is frequently misspelled as "Gillette" on maps and documents) is a ghost town in Yavapai County, Arizona, United States. It has an estimated elevation of 1,362 feet (415 m) above sea level. Historically, it was a stagecoach station, and then a settlement formed around an ore mill serving the Tip Top Mine, on the Agua Fria River in Yavapai County in what was then Arizona Territory. It was named for the mining developer of the Tip Top Mine, Dan B. Gillett and is spelled incorrectly as Gillette on U. S. Topographic Maps and elsewhere.

== History ==
Gillett was founded by the superintendent of the Tip Top Mine, where he located the mill to process the ore from Tip Top, nine miles away. Its post office opened October 15, 1878. At its height in 1878 Gillett, had six streets and aside from its mill and post office, a bank, assay office, hotel, real estate office, livery stable, lumberyard, meat market, truck farm, dairy, warehouse, two blacksmiths, two stagecoach stations, four stores and nine saloons/gambling houses.

== Jack Swilling ==
Jack Swilling, the founder of Phoenix, and his wife Trinidad had various business interests in Gillett. The Swillings owned "Gillett Real Estate", where they sold lots ranging from $100 to $250 depending on the location, a cattle and horse ranch and a vegetable farm in partnership with L.A. Stephens.

In the spring of 1878, word reached the Swillings that Colonel Jacob Snively, a family friend, had been killed by the Apaches in the Wickenburg Mountains near the peak called White Picacho. Mrs. Swilling suggested that Mr. Swilling and two companions, which included Andrew Kirby and George Monroe, founder of Castle Hot Springs, go on a trip to recover and rebury the remains of their old friend.

On April 17, Mr. Swilling and his two companions went on their Snively exhumation trip. Mr. Swilling and his companions returned to Gillett after exhuming Col. Snively's remains at White Picacho Mountains on April 23. He was seen walking the streets of Gillett with a bag or sack containing the remains of Col. Snively. Mr. Swilling buried the bones of Col. Snively on his property next to his house.

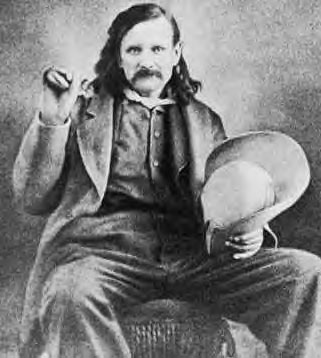
Jack Swilling

Three hooded men, one tall, one medium-size, and one short, robbed a stagecoach near Wickenburg. Six men, including the driver, were shot and killed. Among them was Frederick Wadsworth Loring, a young writer from Boston who had been sent as a correspondent for Appleton's Journal. The incident became known as the Wickenburg Massacre. On one occasion Mr. Swilling and his friends were in a saloon in Gillett discussing the incident and the description of the murderers, Mr. Swilling jokingly mentioned that he and his friends matched the description. Thus, Mr. Swilling and his companions became suspects in the robbery.

Pima County Sheriff Wiley W. Standefer arrested Mr. Swilling and Andrew Kirby. They were eventually turned over to Deputy U.S. Marshal Joseph W. Evans so that the state could charge them in the federal courts. Evans escorted them to the federal jail in Yuma. Prior to his arrest Mr. Swilling had developed a habit of using a combination of narcotics and liquor to relieve the pain caused by old injuries, thus he was not very healthy. The sanitary conditions inside the prison at Yuma were terrible and combined with the August heat, aggravated Mr. Swilling's chronic ill health. He died in his cell on August 12 while awaiting a hearing. The real culprits of the massacre were caught, proving his innocence too late. Mr. Swilling was buried in an unmarked grave on the grounds of the federal prison cemetery before his family could be notified.

== Gillett treasure ==
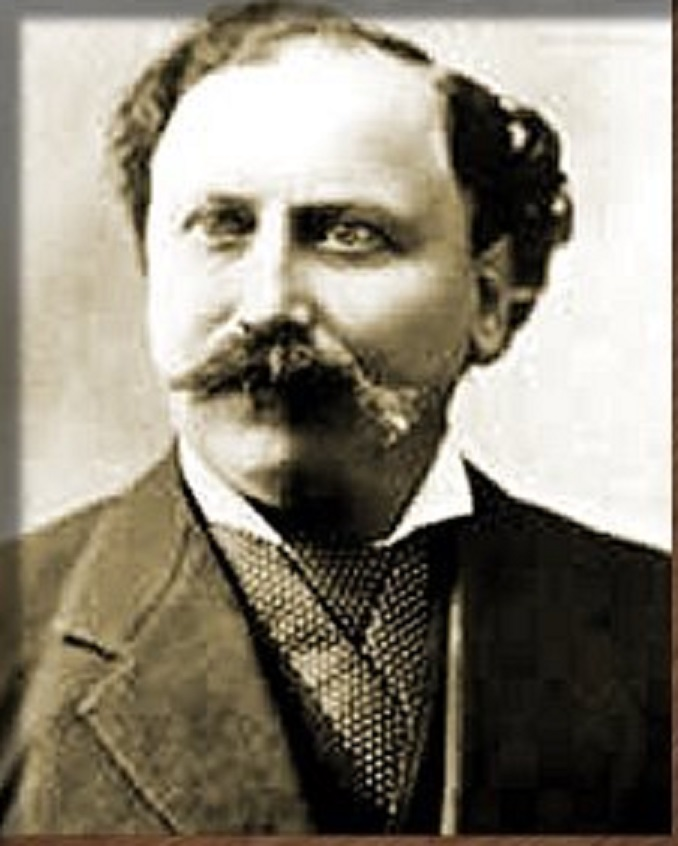
Sheriff Henry Garfias

Among the tales of lawlessness in Gillett is that of Henry Seymour. Seymour was the town's blacksmith who engaged in robbing the Wells Fargo stage coach before it reached the town. In 1882, alone he held up three coaches and no one suspected Seymour because he would already be in his shop before the arrival of the stage coach. The robber, whose total amount in the three robberies added up to $68,000, became known as the "Ghost Bandit".

Normally, Seymour hid his loot after a robbery, however suspicions as to his activities as an outlaw came about when in one occasion he used some of the money from a robbery in a local saloon's poker game.

Maricopa County Sheriff Lindley Orme sent deputy Henry Garfias to investigate the situation. During his investigation Garfias was told by witnesses that on the day of the last robbery they spotted Henry Seymour, the blacksmith, with a rifle under his arm along with several gunny sacks. Garfias suspected that Seymour was the Ghost Bandit and decided to set a trap.

As soon as he found out that the next stagecoach was about to arrive in Gillett, Garfias hid close to the Agua Fria crossing and waited. As soon as he spotted Seymour, who was armed with a rifle, Garfias arrested him.

Thus, Seymour, the "Ghost Bandit", was finally caught when he attempted to rob his fourth stage coach that year. He was tried in Maricopa County and sent to prison. Seymour never told anyone where he hid his treasure and when he was released from prison he never returned to Gillett. Henry Garfias later become the first marshal of Phoenix.

== The decline of Gillett ==
After the mill was closed in 1880, and moved to Tip Top in 1884, the town was soon abandoned. Its post office had postmasters appointed up to October 1883, but it was discontinued in August 1887. What remained was a store and a stagecoach station and a population of two.

The stagecoach station was within the Black Canyon wagon road and stage route. The portion of the trail around Gillett and south of Prescott was surrounded by boulders and scrub. This portion made it easy for stagecoach robbers to hide and ambush stagecoaches, making the trail a dangerous one to travel on. This resulted in the Wells Fargo Express Company halt of shipments over the route. The stagecoach station remained opened until 1912 when it also was abandoned. The Burfind Hotel was the largest structure in Gillett and ruins of it and a neglected cemetery remain.
