= Hells Canyon (disambiguation) =

Hells Canyon is a canyon of the Snake River in Oregon and Idaho, including in the Hells Canyon Wilderness (Oregon and Idaho) and the larger Hells Canyon National Recreation Area

"Hells Canyon" or "Hell Canyon" may also refer to:

- Hell Canyon of the Verde River, at Drake, Arizona in Yavapai County, Arizona,
- Hells Canyon Wilderness (Arizona), in southern Yavapai County, on the border with Maricopa County, Arizona
- Hells Canyon (South Dakota)
