= Hells Canyon Wilderness =

Hells Canyon Wilderness is the name of two distinct component units of the United States National Wilderness Preservation System:

- Hells Canyon Wilderness (Oregon and Idaho)
- Hells Canyon Wilderness (Arizona)
