= Jacob Snively =

Arizona and Texas pioneer (1809–1871)

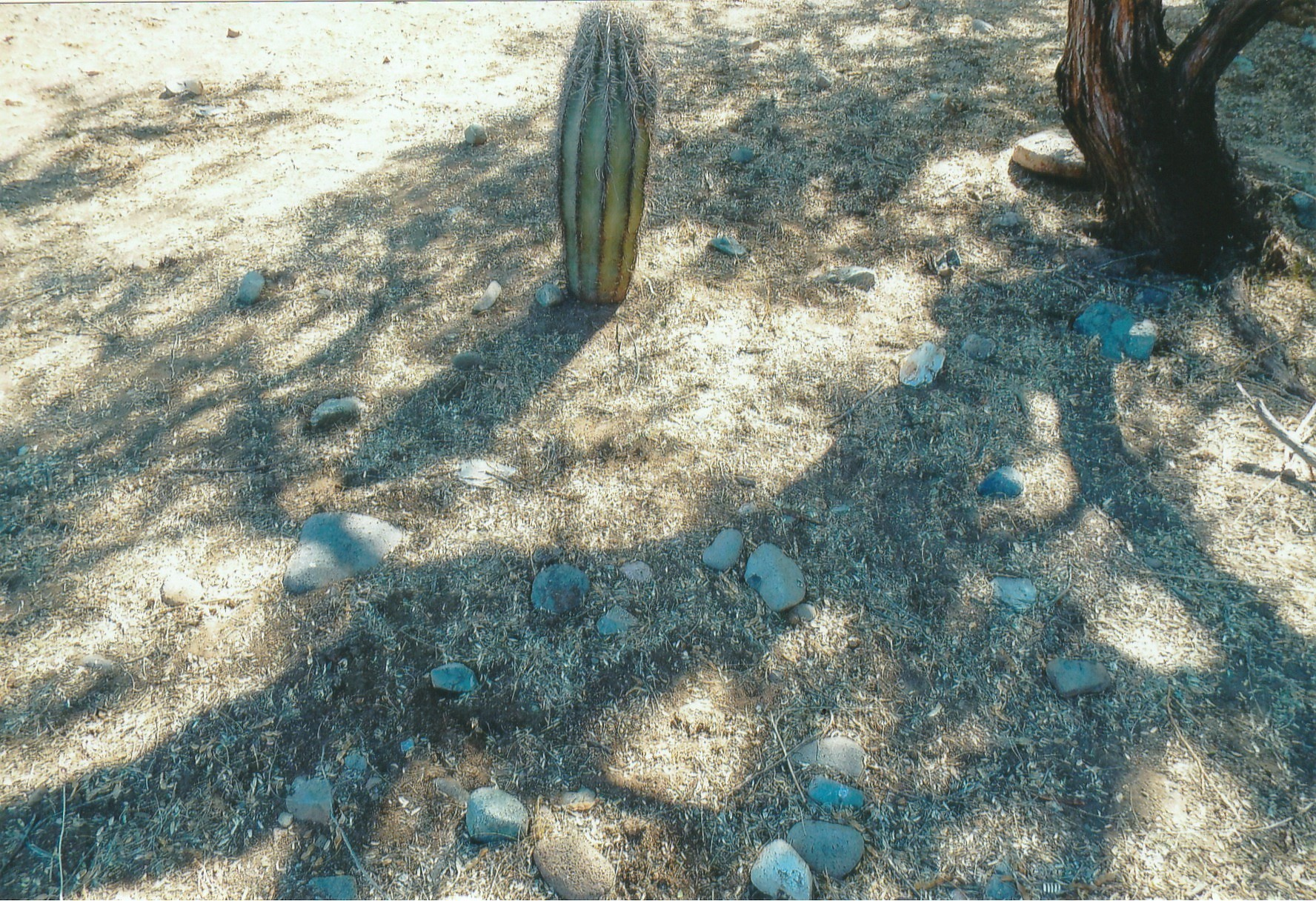
- Jacob Snively was buried by Jack Swilling an Arizona pioneer on his property in Black Canyon City. The Sniverly grave site is located where the rocks and small cactus are pictured.
- Born: 1809; Greencastle, Pennsylvania, US
- Died: 1871 (aged 62); Gillett, Arizona, Arizona Territory, now part of present-day Black Canyon City, US
- Burial place: Jack Swilling house property in Black Canyon City, Arizona Territory.
- Occupations: surveyor, civil engineer, soldier, military officer, ambassador, paymaster general, quartermaster, government official, prospector, mine owner, judge
- Employer(s): Republic of Texas government, self-employed
- Known for: Being a soldier and government official for the Republic of Texas and discovering gold and silver mines in California, Arizona, and New Mexico
- Relatives: David Snively (twin brother)
- Military career
- Allegiance: Republic of Texas
- Branch: Texian Army (1835–1836); Army of the Republic of Texas (1836–1837, 1839, 1843)
- Rank: Captain (Texian Army); Colonel (Army of the Republic of Texas)
- Units: First Infantry Regiment, Company A, Texian Army
- Commands: First Infantry Regiment, Company B, Texian Army
- Conflicts: Texas Revolution

Jacob Snively (1809–1871) was a surveyor, civil engineer, officer of the Texian Army and the Army of the Republic of Texas, California 49er, miner, and Arizona pioneer.

== Early life ==
Jacob Snively was born in Greencastle, Pennsylvania along with his twin brother David. His family moved soon afterwards to Hamilton County, Ohio. Snively studied to become a surveyor and civil engineer.

== Texas settler, Texas Revolution, Texas Ranger, and Army of the Texas Republic ==
Jacob Snively moved to Nacogdoches, Texas, Republic of Mexico in April, 1835 where he was a surveyor of land grants for the Mexican government and received his own land in July, 1835. Commissioned on March 26, 1836, during the Texas Revolution he served as a first lieutenant of Company A, First Infantry Regiment under Henry W. Millard. In August he was promoted to captain and assigned to command of Company B. Sam Houston appointed him an ambassador to the Shawnee Indians on January 24, 1837, to sound out the tribe's intentions towards the Republic of Texas and Mexico. On May 13, 1837, he was appointed to the rank of colonel and made paymaster general of the Army, and for a short time was acting secretary of war, before resigning from the army in September 1837. During the time of his resignation from the army, he served as Captain, September 14–December 13, 1838, of a group of Texas Mounted Rangers in the 1st Regiment of Mounted Gunmen/Battalion of Volunteer Rangers commanded by Major Leonard H Mabbitt. Later in 1839, he once again served as paymaster general under Albert Sidney Johnston and in 1843 was quartermaster of the army and an assistant inspector general of the republic.

== Snively Expedition ==
In January 1843 Snively proposed an operation to intercept a train of Mexican traders who would be returning from Missouri on the Santa Fe Trail by way of Texas territory and to seize their goods. This was to be in retaliation for the Mexican raids on San Antonio in 1842 and for the mistreatment of Texas prisoners captured in the Mier Expedition and on the Texan Santa Fe Expedition. Snively was given authorization on February 16, 1843, but instructed not to violate the sovereignty of the United States. He was to raise and command a detachment of partisans not officially connected to Texas. Leaving on April 24, this 170-man strong Battalion of Invincibles fought and defeated a detachment of 100 Mexican soldiers on the Arkansas River on June 20. However, on July 15, they were in turn surrounded and disarmed by a detachment of the U. S. Dragoons under the command of Captain Philip St. George Cooke for intruding into U. S. territory and killing a Mexican citizen. Many of the expedition left for Texas or for Missouri with the Dragoons. The remainder, less than 70, did continue and intercepted the train of goods they were after, but guarded by a strong force of Mexican soldiers under Governor Manuel Armijo, in their weakened condition it was too strong to attack and they returned to Texas.

== California, New Mexico, and Arizona Territory ==
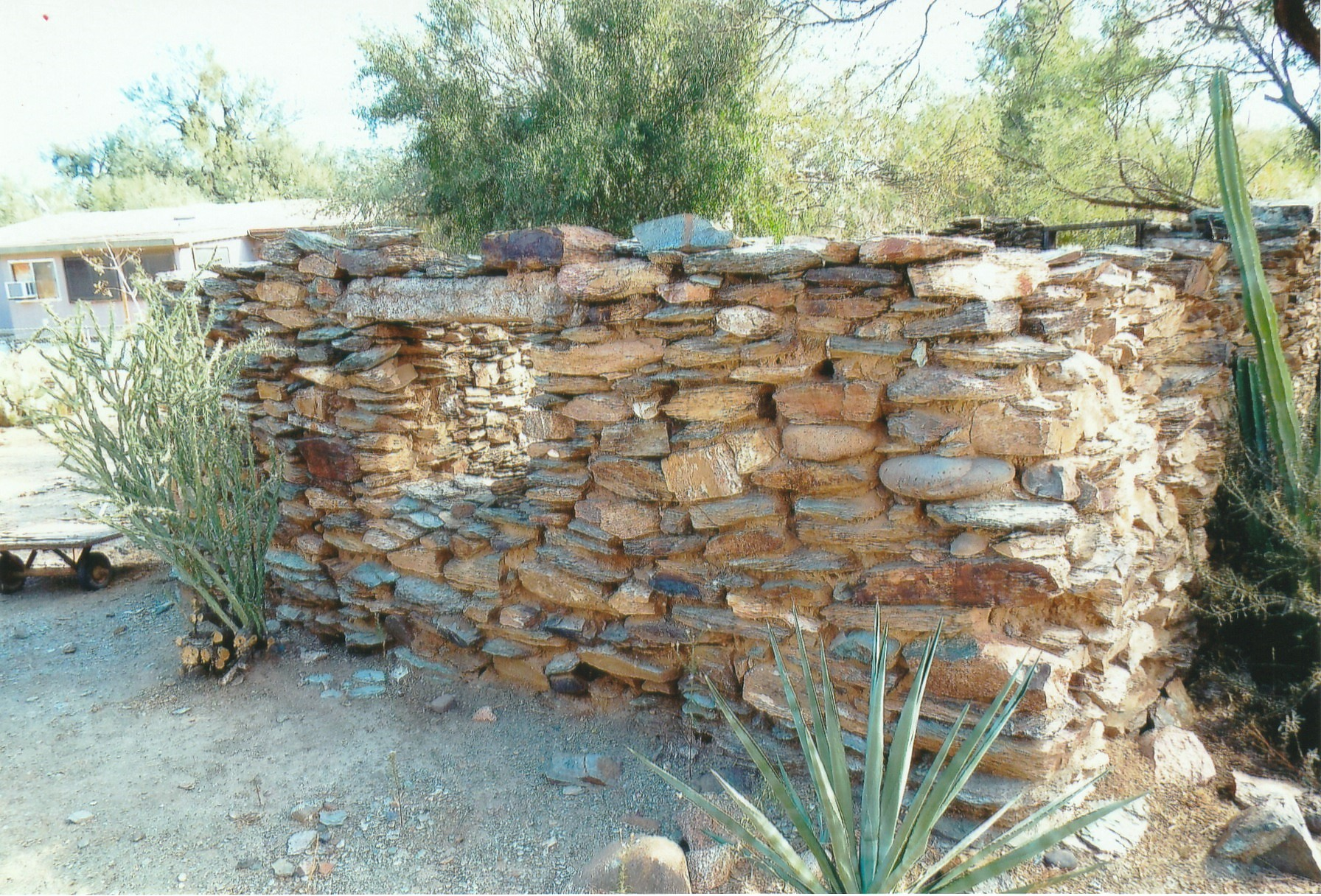
Ruins of the Jack Swilling residence

During the California Gold Rush in 1849, Snively left his interests in Corpus Christi with his brother David and crossed northern Mexico, then sailed to the California gold fields from Mazatlán. After spending nine years searching for gold there, he moved to New Mexico Territory in 1858. There he led a group that discovered gold placers on the Gila River twenty miles east of Fort Yuma. The resulting gold rush created the short-lived boomtown of Gila City. Snively subsequently was involved in the discovery of the silver-lead ore of the Castle Dome silver mine in the Castle Dome Mountains to the north of Gila City. With Hermann V. Ehrenberg he created the Castle Dome mining district in spring of 1863. That same year, after the first territorial election in for the newly organized Arizona Territory, its Governor John Noble Goodwin appointed Snively a judge. From 1866 Snively's affairs prospered with the success of the Castle Dome mine and as he made and lost small fortunes in New Mexico and Nevada ventures.

== Death ==
On March 27, 1871, Snively was with a group that left from his home, in what is now Phoenix, to prospect in the direction of Wickenburg, Arizona, when his group was attacked by an estimated 150 Apache at the White Picacho. Snively, mortally wounded, was abandoned by his companions. Later found in the arroyo where it fell, his badly decomposed and partially devoured body was buried nearby. Seven years later his friend and fellow Arizona pioneer Jack Swilling and two friends recovered his remains from its remote grave and reburied them behind the Swilling house in what is now Black Canyon City near the Wells Fargo stage stop and ore mill settlement.

== Honors ==
Snively Holes, a watering place in Arizona east of Bill Williams Mountain, in Coconino County, Arizona was named for him.
