= Hieroglyphic Mountains =

Mountain range in central Arizona

- Location within Arizona

Highest point
- Peak: Crater Benchmark
- Elevation: 4,565 ft (1,391 m)
- Coordinates: 33°59′22″N 112°29′2″W

Geography
- Country: United States
- State: Arizona
- Borders on: Bradshaw Mountains and Wickenburg Mountains

Geology
- Orogeny: volcanic
- Rock age: Precambrian
- Rock types: granite and schist

The Hieroglyphic Mountains are a mountain range located in central Arizona. The Hieroglyphics roughly straddle the border between Maricopa and Yavapai counties and form an effective physical barrier northwest of the Phoenix Metropolitan Area. Due to their proximity to Phoenix and its environs, the mountains offer a number of outdoor recreational activities.

The Hieroglyphic Mountains were named in an apparent confusion between Egyptian hieroglyphs and the petroglyphs found in the area.

== History ==
Early human settlement in the Hieroglyphic mountains is sparse at best. Existing petroglyphs indicate that the area had been settled, or at least visited, by Native Americans prior to the 19th century. A gold strike on the Colorado River near Yuma in 1862 created local interest in prospecting, and the Hieroglyphics were among many of the local mountain ranges visited by prospectors during this time period, but the ruggedness of the terrain and the scarcity of water largely discouraged permanent settlement.

In the early 19th century, local Yavapai Indians had discovered a natural hot spring in the mountains, treating the location as a sort of "demilitarized zone" where all were welcome to come and treat their wounds. The springs were discovered by US Army Colonel Charles Craig in 1867 while pursuing a group of Yavapais through the mountains. The group named the spring Castle Springs for the castellated appearance of the surrounding mountains. While most sources credit Craig with the discovery, some sources claim that the springs were first discovered by a gold miner in 1874.

Ongoing fighting between the US Army and the Yavapai tribes would discourage further development of the area until the 1880s when the springs and the adjacent land were purchased by Frank Murphy for the construction of a health resort. The resort was completed in 1896 and the newly renamed Castle Hot Springs were heavily advertised to potential clients. During the resort's heyday in the 1920s it was extremely popular and was visited by celebrities such as Zane Grey, as well as famous families such as the Rockefeller family. The resort was also used by the United States military as a rehabilitation center from 1943–1944 to treat injured veterans of World War II. Future president John F. Kennedy spent 3 months at the resort during this time period to recover from his wounds. The resort continued to be popular until it was heavily damaged in a fire in 1976.

In 1928 a dam was constructed on the Agua Fria River where it passes through the mountain range, creating Lake Pleasant. The lake was primarily used as an agricultural storage facility, but with the creation of the Central Arizona Project in 1973 the lake became a permanent water storage facility and an important recreational center. The dam was replaced in 1993, increasing the size of the lake.

== Geography ==
The Hieroglyphic Mountains run primarily east to west along the border between Maricopa and Yavapai counties. The Agua Fria River is the primary waterway in the region, passing through the southeastern portion of the range. The Buckhorn Mountains are a smaller range located within the Hieroglyphics, and contain the range's highest points including Crater Benchmark, 4,565 feet (1,391 m) in elevation. Other mountains located within the range are:

- White Picacho 4,283 feet (1,305 m)
- Garfias Mountain 3,381 feet (1,031 m)
- Hellgate Mountain 3,339 feet (1,018 m)
- Governors Peak 3,260 feet (990 m)

The range is bounded, roughly, by the Agua Fria River to the east, the Bradshaw Mountains to the north, and the Wickenburg Mountains to the west, or the Hassayampa River if the Wickenburg Mountains are considered a part of the Hieroglyphics range.

== Protected areas ==
The range is home to the Hells Canyon Wilderness, a wilderness area maintained by the Bureau of Land Reclamation.

== See also ==
- List of mountain ranges of Maricopa County, Arizona
