= Black Canyon City, Arizona =

CDP in Yavapai County, Arizona, US

- CDP
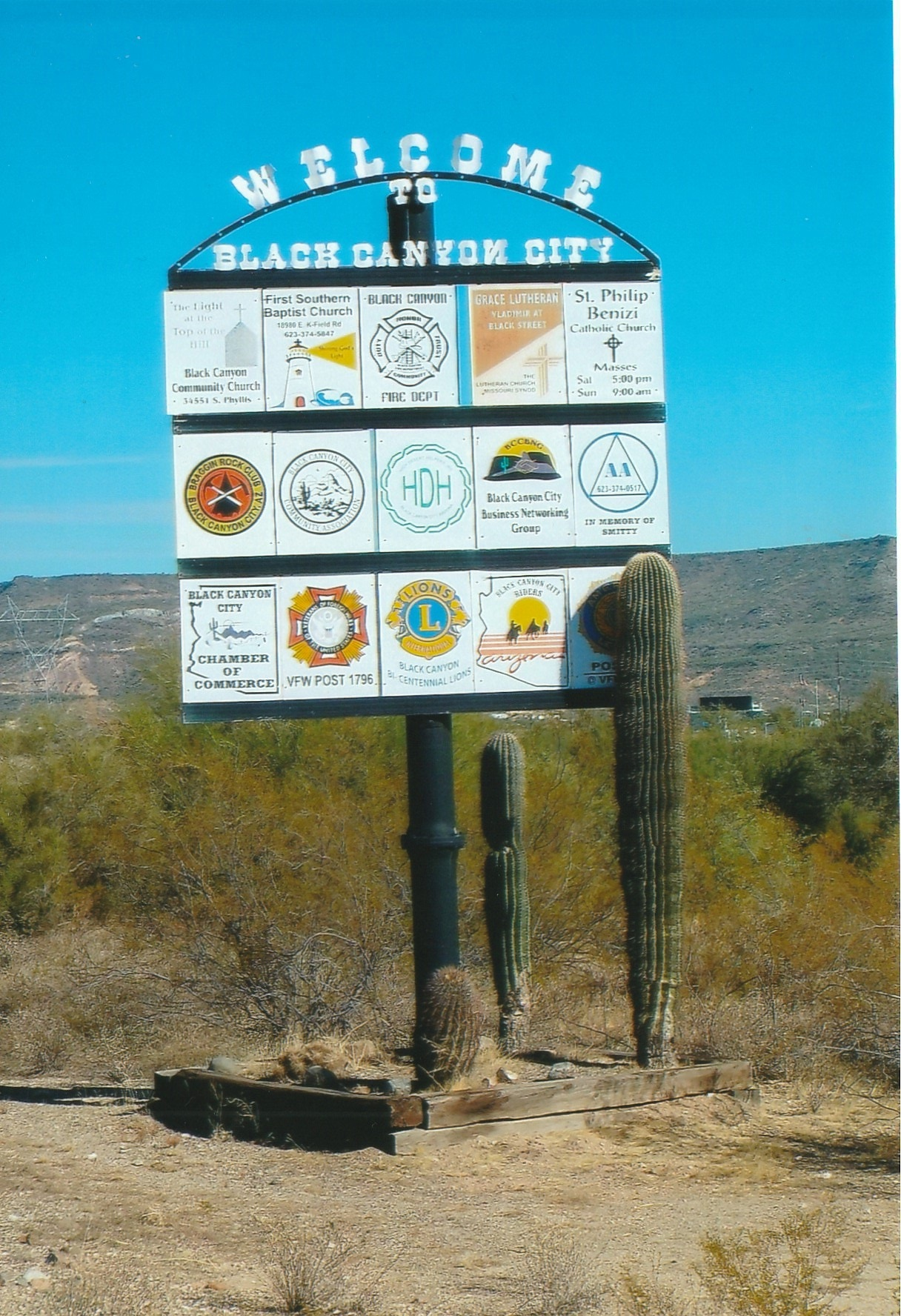
- Welcome to Black Canyon City

- Location in Yavapai County and the state of Arizona

- Location in the United States Black Canyon City (the United States)
- Coordinates: 34°04′23″N 112°08′16″W
- Country: United States
- State: Arizona
- County: Yavapai

Area
  - Total: 24.62 sq mi (63.77 km^{2})
  - Land: 24.62 sq mi (63.77 km^{2})
  - Water: 0 sq mi (0.00 km^{2})
- Elevation: 2,083 ft (635 m)

Population (2020)
  - Total: 2,677
  - Density: 108.7/sq mi (41.98/km^{2})
- Time zone: UTC-7 (MST)
- ZIP code: 85324
- Area code: 623
- FIPS code: 04-06610
- GNIS feature ID: 2407854

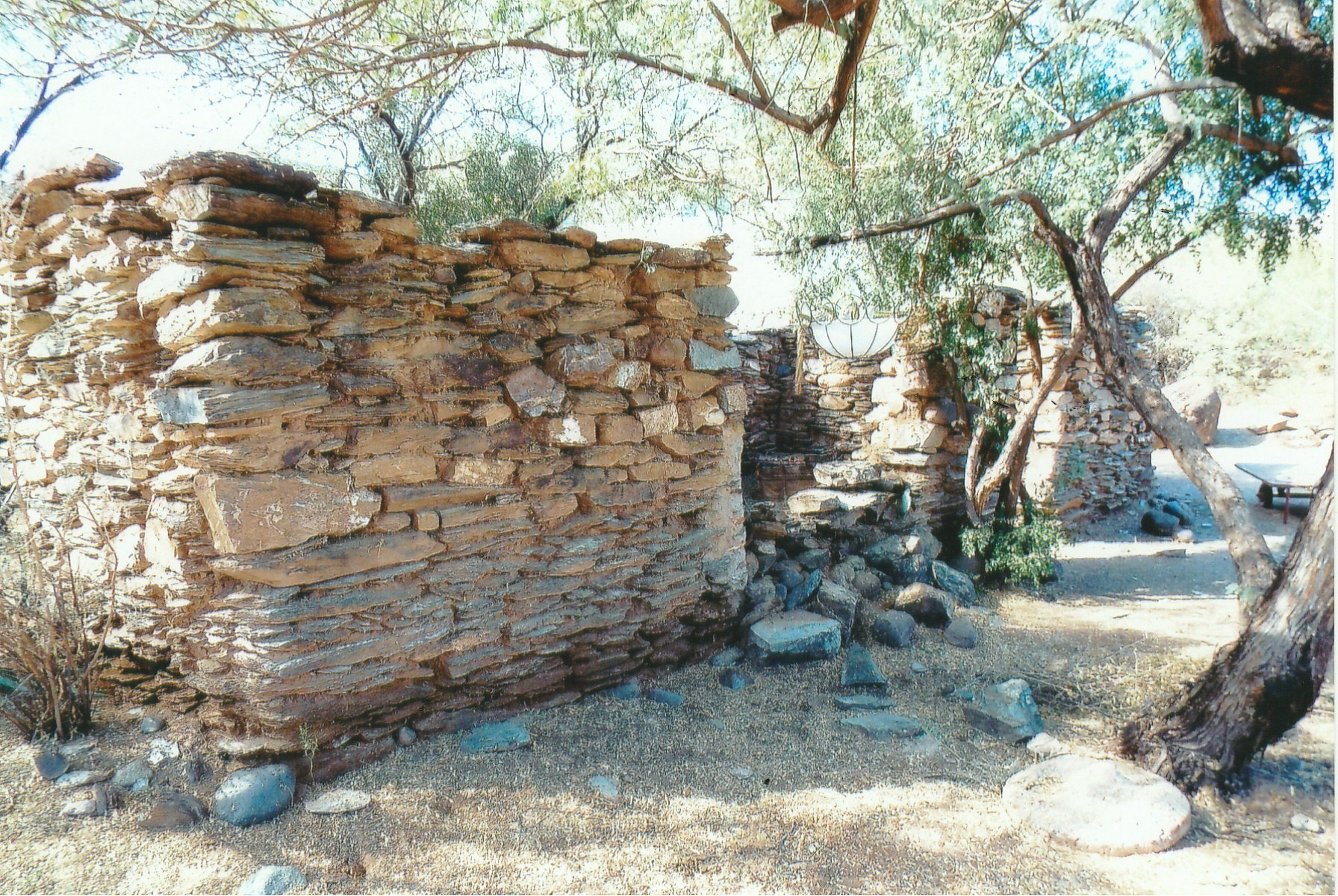
The ruins of the Jack and Trinidad Swilling cabin

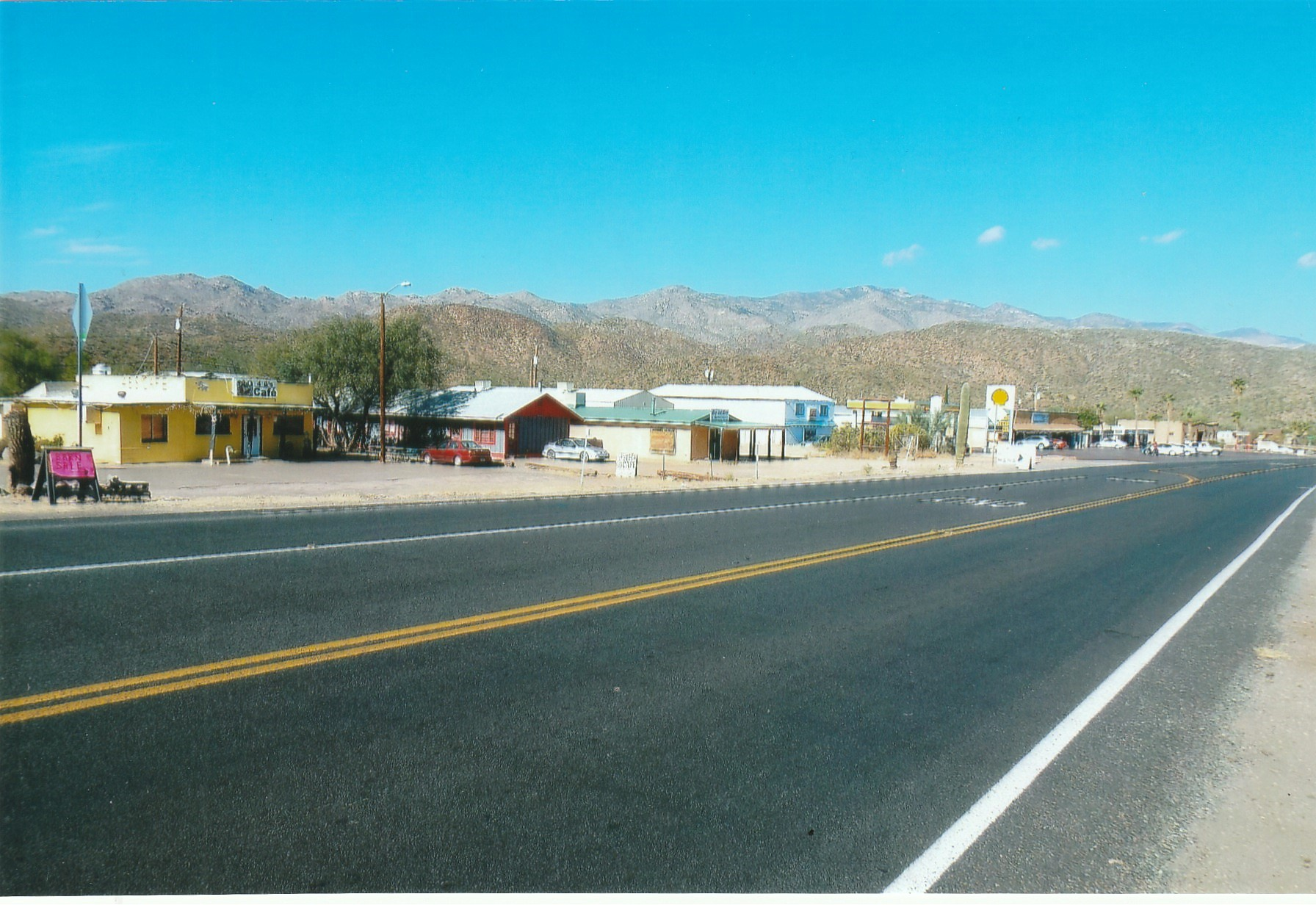
Old Black Canyon Hwy.

Black Canyon City is an unincorporated community and census-designated place (CDP) in Yavapai County, Arizona, United States. The population is 2,677 as of the 2020 census.

== Geography ==
According to the United States Census Bureau, the CDP has a total area of 20.0 square miles (52 km^{2}), all land.

Black Canyon City is located in southern Yavapai County and is approximately 22 miles north of Phoenix. Included in the southern part of Black Canyon City is the community of Rock Springs. It is served by Interstate 17, which bisects the city. I-17 is the main north–south freeway between Phoenix and Flagstaff. The Agua Fria river runs right through the center of Black Canyon City and the river empties into Lake Pleasant to the southwest.

Black Canyon City is becoming a bedroom exurb of Phoenix with the continued rapid growth of Phoenix northward. The assessed value of Black Canyon City property more than doubled between 2000 and 2007.

== History ==
Black Canyon City has been known by several names, including Goddard or Goddards, Cañon, and Black Canyon. Goddard's was a stage stop on the Phoenix to Prescott line, a military stopover en route to Fort Whipple and Fort Verde during Territorial days, and a supply center for mines in the southern Bradshaw Mountains.

Pre-Columbian Native Americans have inhabited the area around Black Canyon for thousands of years, Evident from petroglyphs and pottery shards discovered in the area.

The area was first settled by people of Anglo-European origin in the 1870s, and the first post office was established as Cañon in May 1894, with postmaster Charles E. Goddard, and was discontinued in October 1899. It was reestablished again from February 1903 to November 1906. An early settler was Jack Swilling and his wife Trinidad Swilling, who moved there in 1871. The walls of his ranch house, Swillings Cabin – the community's oldest building still stand.

In 2004, residents proposed incorporating the area as a town and submitted sufficient signatures to hold an election. However, the initiative failed with 72% voting against incorporation.

== Demographics ==
Historical population
Census	Pop.	Note	%±
1960	100		—
1990	1,811		—
2000	2,697		48.9%
2010	2,837		5.2%
2020	2,677		−5.6%
U.S. Decennial Census

Black Canyon's population in the 1960 census was estimated at 100.

Black Canyon City appeared on the 1990 U.S. Census as a census-designated place (CDP).

=== 2020 census ===
As of the 2020 census, Black Canyon City had a population of 2,677. The median age was 57.2 years. 12.9% of residents were under the age of 18 and 33.2% of residents were 65 years of age or older. For every 100 females there were 107.2 males, and for every 100 females age 18 and over there were 107.4 males age 18 and over.

0.0% of residents lived in urban areas, while 100.0% lived in rural areas.

There were 1,278 households in Black Canyon City, of which 13.7% had children under the age of 18 living in them. Of all households, 40.1% were married-couple households, 28.5% were households with a male householder and no spouse or partner present, and 22.8% were households with a female householder and no spouse or partner present. About 39.9% of all households were made up of individuals and 22.6% had someone living alone who was 65 years of age or older.

There were 1,507 housing units, of which 15.2% were vacant. The homeowner vacancy rate was 2.4% and the rental vacancy rate was 14.7%.

Racial composition as of the 2020 census
Race	Number	Percent
White	2,330	87.0%
Black or African American	16	0.6%
American Indian and Alaska Native	36	1.3%
Asian	18	0.7%
Native Hawaiian and Other Pacific Islander	2	0.1%
Some other race	76	2.8%
Two or more races	199	7.4%
Hispanic or Latino (of any race)	191	7.1%

=== 2000 census ===
As of the census of 2000, there were 2,697 people, 1,241 households, and 771 families residing in the CDP. The population density was 135.1 inhabitants per square mile (52.2/km^{2}). There were 1,409 housing units at an average density of 70.6 per square mile (27.3/km^{2}). The racial makeup of the CDP was 95.9% White, 0.2% Black or African American, 1.2% Native American, 0.2% Asian, <0.1% Pacific Islander, 0.7% from other races, and 1.8% from two or more races. 3.4% of the population were Hispanic or Latino of any race.

There were 1,241 households, out of which 18.0% had children under the age of 18 living with them, 51.5% were married couples living together, 6.8% had a female householder with no husband present, and 37.8% were non-families. 30.9% of all households were made up of individuals, and 13.8% had someone living alone who was 65 years of age or older. The average household size was 2.17 and the average family size was 2.64.

In the CDP, the population was spread out, with 17.5% under the age of 18, 4.9% from 18 to 24, 23.8% from 25 to 44, 32.3% from 45 to 64, and 21.6% who were 65 years of age or older. The median age was 47 years. For every 100 females, there were 109.7 males. For every 100 females age 18 and over, there were 108.1 males.

The median income for a household in the CDP was $32,908, and the median income for a family was $41,193. Males had a median income of $36,310 versus $22,750 for females. The per capita income for the CDP was $20,117. About 7.6% of families and 12.9% of the population were below the poverty line, including 16.9% of those under age 18 and 9.7% of those age 65 or over.

== Superior water quality standards ==
Black Canyon City, in common with such other Yavapai county communities as Camp Verde, Cornville, Rimrock and Village of Oak Creek, has well water exceeding the current maximum limit of 10 ppb arsenic. Two thirds of the Black Canyon City residents and most of the businesses are served by a water District. The remaining residents are served by a private water company. Both water systems have invested heavily in arsenic treatment facilities and the water in Black Canyon City fully meets all federal standards. Both are continuously monitored by ADEQ

== Parks ==
Black Canyon City has two parks

- Black Canyon Heritage Park – about 8 acres with accessible trail that provides riparian, birding, butterfly and other environmental experiences in a family friendly, nurturing setting. Visitor Center is managed by the Black Canyon City Chamber of Commerce.
- High Desert Park – about 89-acre park with ramadas, baseball field, and more.

== Education ==
Most residents are within the Cañon Elementary School District, while some are in the Mayer Unified School District. As of 1984 the Cañon district sends high school students and junior high level special education students to the Deer Valley Unified School District.

== Public safety ==
Police protection in the Black Canyon City area is the responsibility of the Southern Area Command of the Yavapai County Sheriff's Office.

== Notable people ==
- Jacob Snively (1809–1871), a surveyor, civil engineer, officer of the Army of the Republic of Texas.
- John W. "Jack" Swilling (1830–1878), an early pioneer in the Arizona Territory, prospector, and commonly credited as one of the original founders of Phoenix, Arizona

== Fire district ==
The fire department was established in 1969 and was originally called "Canyon Community Volunteer Fire Department." In 1983, the department became a Fire District and the name was changed to Black Canyon Fire District.

Effective May 22, 2017, Black Canyon Fire District consolidated into the Daisy Mountain Fire District.

== See also ==
- List of historic properties in Black Canyon City, Arizona
