= Hells Canyon (South Dakota) =

Valley in South Dakota, United States

Coordinates: 45°20′32″N 103°51′18″W

Hells Canyon is a valley in the U.S. state of South Dakota.

Hells Canyon received its name from its treacherous terrain (i.e. the valley was "hell to cross").
