= Hells Canyon Wilderness (Arizona) =

Protected area in Arizona, United States

- IUCN category Ib (wilderness area)
- Location within the United States
- Location: Yavapai / Maricopa counties, Arizona, US
- Nearest city: Phoenix, Arizona
- Coordinates: 33.94474316°N 112.385326358°W
- Area: 9,900 acres (40.1 km^{2})
- Established: 1990
- Governing body: Bureau of Land Management

Hells Canyon Wilderness is a 9,951 acre (4,027 ha) wilderness area in the U.S. state of Arizona. It is located approximately 25 miles (40 km) northwest of Phoenix in Maricopa and southeast Yavapai counties.

== Topography ==
Hells Canyon Wilderness is a portion of the Hieroglyphic Mountains. The most prominent peaks are Garfias Mountain at 3,381 feet (1,030.5 m) and Hellgate Mountain at 3,339 feet (1,017.7 m). Other peaks, most over 3,000 feet (910 m) in elevation, encircle Burro Flats, effectively isolating the flats from the surrounding countryside.

== Private Land ==
On Earth Day, 2008, The Wilderness Land Trust purchased a 640-acre (2.6 km^{2}) inholding near the center of Hells Canyon Wilderness. The parcel included Hells Canyon itself and had belonged to a Phoenix area land developer. Once the Trust transfers the land to the federal government the entire wilderness area will be publicly owned.

== Vegetation ==
Most of Hells Canyon Wilderness is covered by Sonoran Desert shrub vegetation such as saguaro cactus, paloverde, barrel cactus, ocotillo, and various desert grasses.

== Recreation ==
Popular recreational activities in Hells Canyon Wilderness include rock climbing, hiking, wildlife watching, and camping.

== See also ==
- Bradshaw Mountains
- Castle Hot Springs (Arizona)
- List of Arizona Wilderness Areas
- List of U.S. Wilderness Areas
- Wilderness Act
