= White Picacho =

Landform in Yavapai County, Arizona

- Location within Arizona Location within the United States

Highest point
- Elevation: 4,285 ft (1,306 m) NAVD 88
- Prominence: 323 ft (98 m)
- Coordinates: 33°58′20″N 112°30′37″W

Geography
- Location: Yavapai County, Arizona, U.S.
- Parent range: Hieroglyphic Mountains
- Topo map: USGS Red Picacho

White Picacho is a summit with an elevation of 4,285 feet (1,306 m) in the Hieroglyphic Mountains in Yavapai County, Arizona.

The White Picacho pegmatite district is a historic mining district located in southern Yavapai and northern Maricopa counties. The mines of the district are located to the southwest of White Picacho and adjacent Red Picacho peaks some seven miles east of Wickenburg. The district is noted for production of niobium, feldspar, tantalum, tungsten, beryllium, mica, bismuth, lithium, lead, gold, zinc, vanadium, molybdenum and rare-earth elements.
