= Wickenburg Mountains =

Mountain range in Maricopa and Yavapai Counties, Arizona

Wickenburg Mountains is a mountain range located in Maricopa and Yavapai Counties in Arizona. Denver Hill, at an altitude of 4,406 feet or 1,343 meters, is the tallest peak in the range. 34°02′02″N 112°33′59″W
