= List of historic properties in Black Canyon City, Arizona =

- City
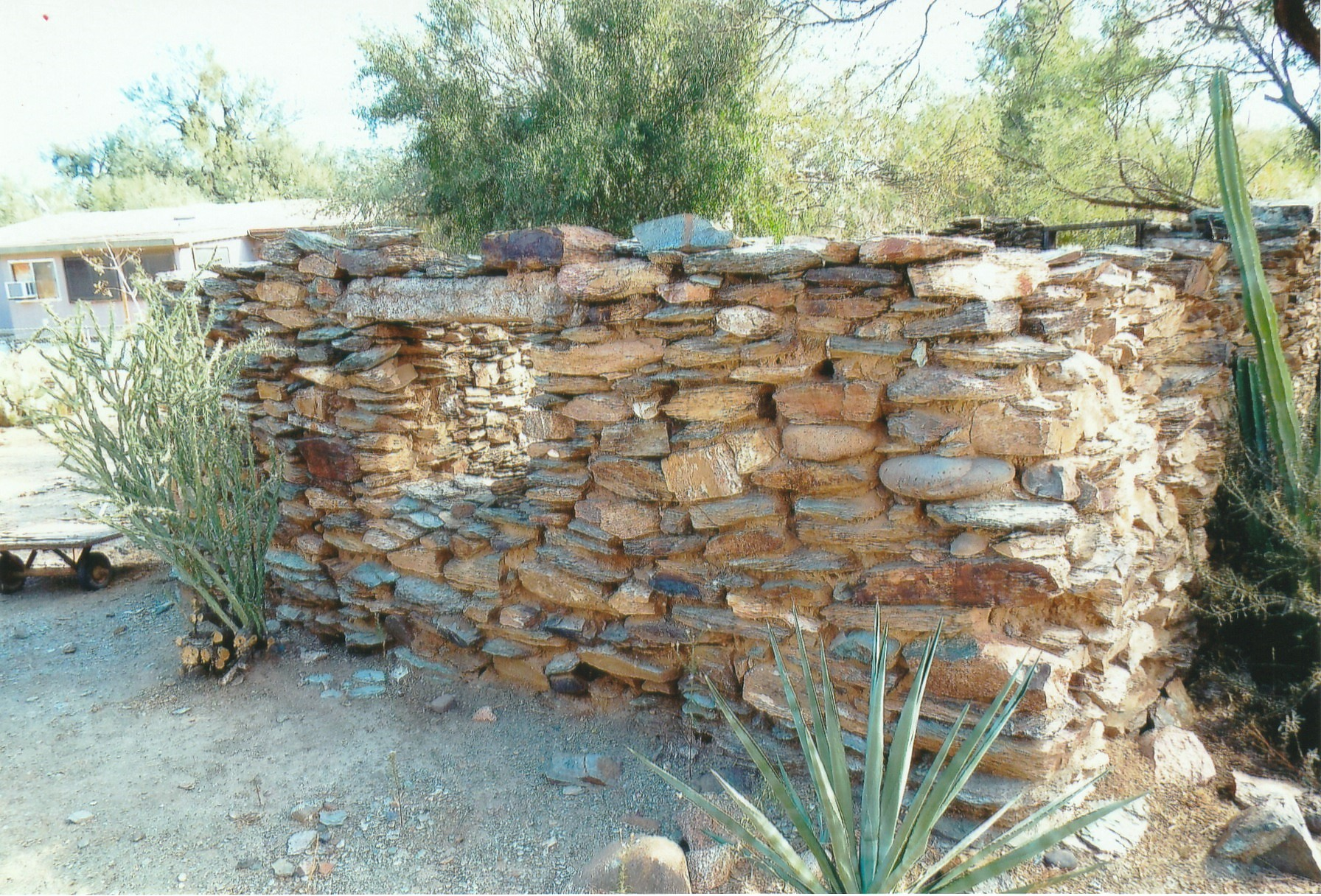
- Ruins of the Swilling residence

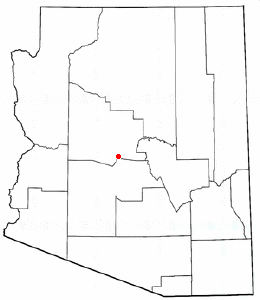
- Location in Yavapai County and the state of Arizona

This is a list, which includes a photographic gallery, of some of the remaining structures and monuments, of historic significance in Black Canyon City, a town in Yavapai County, Arizona.

== Brief history ==
The area surrounding Black Canyon City was first inhabited by the ancient Native-American tribe known as the Yavapai. Anglo-European settlers arrived in the area in search of gold after Arizona became a United States Territory. The Maggie Mine was among the mines founded there. The United States provided a small military detachment to protect the miners from the Yavapai. The area had been known by several names in the past, including Goddard or Goddards, Cañon, and Black Canyon.

Among the early settlers was Jack and Trinidad Swilling, also known as the "Father" and "Mother" of Phoenix. Jack Swilling was the founder of the Swilling Irrigation and Canal Company, the first modern-era irrigation canals in the Salt River Valley, which started the small farming community of Phoenix. The Swillings moved to the area in 1871 and established a ranch there. The Swilling cabin served as a stopping place for those who traveled the old Black Canyon Trail from Prescott to Phoenix. The ruins of the Swilling stone cabin are the oldest in Black Canyon City.

In 1872, Wells Fargo, established a stage coach stop. This served as a water stop for miners, cattle drivers, sheepherders and travelers on the Black Canyon trail. The first post office was established in 1894 and named "Cañon", with Charles E. Goddard as postmaster, and was discontinued in October 1899.

== Black Canyon City Historical Society ==
The Black Canyon City's Historical Society is housed in the Historic 1926 Schoolhouse and Museum and located in the Black Canyon Heritage Park at 33955 S. Old Black Canyon Highway.The Chamber of Commerce and The Friends of the Agua Fria National Monument also have an office there. Their mission is to provide biological, cultural information, plus the history of the early Arizonans and Native Americans to the area.

The Friends of the Agua Fria National Monument does not have the authority to deny a demolition permit. Therefore, the owner of a property, even if it is listed either in the National Register of Historic Places, may demolish the historical property if he or she so wishes. According to Jim McPherson, Arizona Preservation Foundation Board President:

It is crucial that residents, private interests, and government officials act now to save these elements of our cultural heritage before it is too late.

== Historic structures ==
The following is a brief description of the historic properties that are pictured:

- The Jack and Trinidad Swilling Stone Cabin ruins – The ruins of the 1868 Swilling cabin is the oldest structure still standing in Black Canyon City.

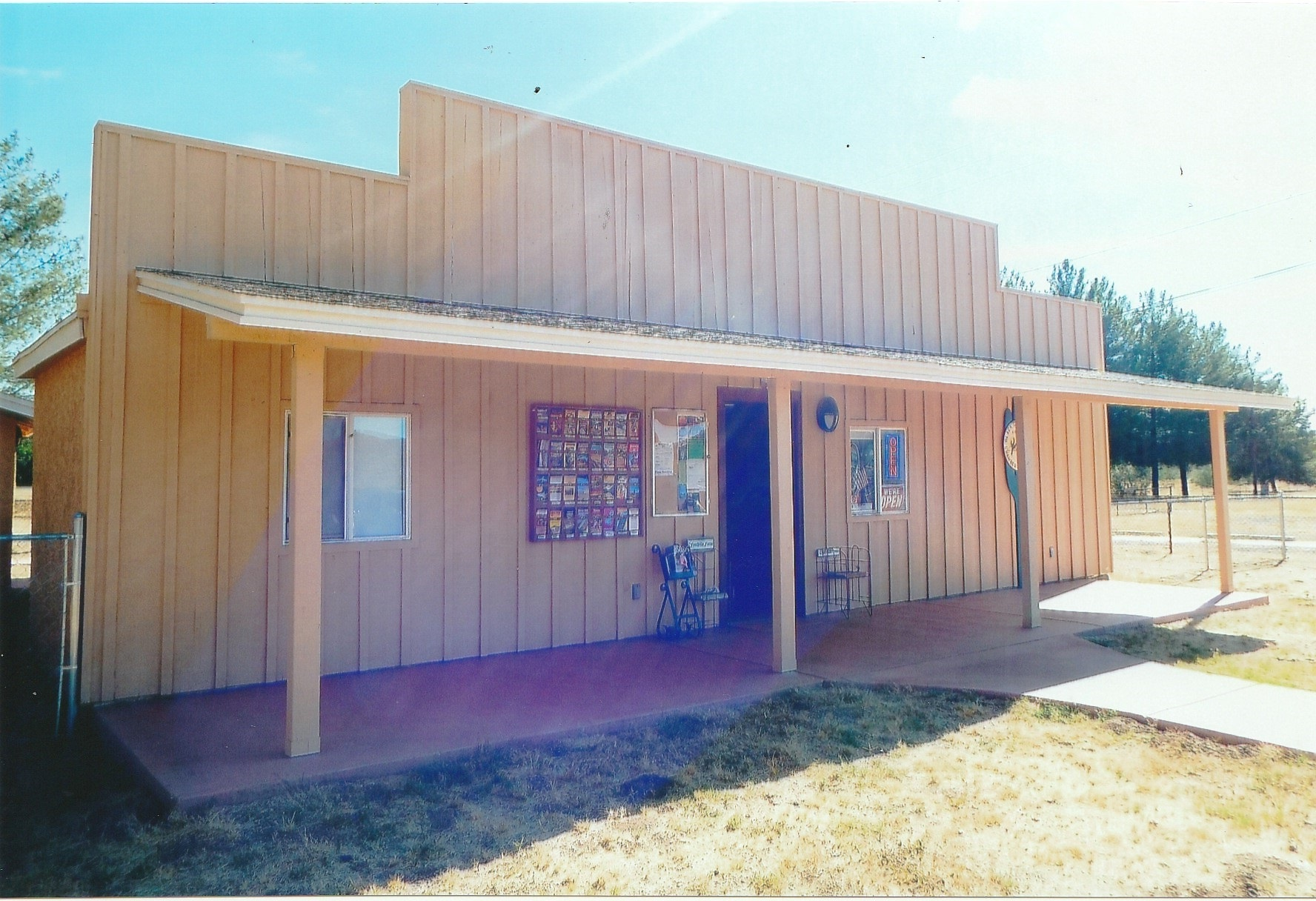
Black Canyon City Chamber of Commerce.

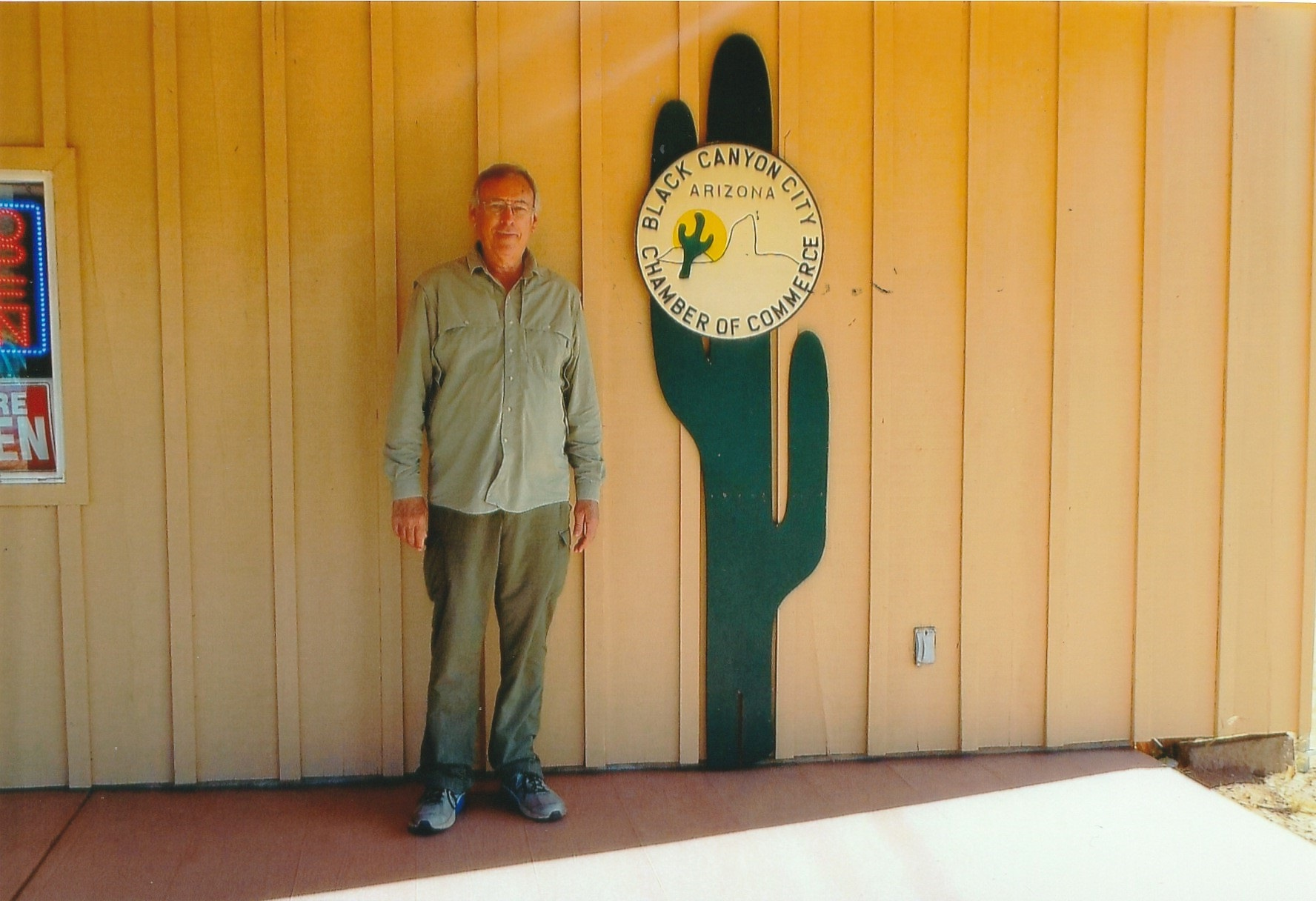
Bob Cothern of the Black Canyon City Chamber of Commerce

- The grave of Col. Jacob Snively – Col. Jacob Snively, a friend of Jack Swilling, was buried on the Swilling ranch grounds by the cabin in 1871. The small cactus and rocks mark the grave.
- The Wells Fargo Stage Stop – The stage stop was built in 1872 close to the Maggie Mine.
- The Maggie Mine Bridge – A small bridge over Black Canyon Creek with coal car tracks leading to the Maggie Mine which was founded in the 1870s.
- Vernacular House – 1885 Vernacular House.
- The Early Pioneer Residence – An early pioneer residence built in 1894.
- The Old Black Canyon City Bridge – The bridge is located on the old Black Canyon Hwy. over the Agua Fria River.
- An abandoned Store Building – This abandoned building served as a general store next to the post office in the 1900s.
- The Rock Springs Hotel – Originally established as a hotel 1918, this building has hosted guests which included Wyatt Earp, Jean Harlow and Tom Mix. The building now houses the Rock Springs Cafe.
- The Black Canyon School House – The historic school house was built in 1926 and is located in the grounds of the Heritage Park on the Old Black Canyon Hwy.
- The old "A" frame house – The "A" frame house was built in the 1950s and serves as the "Jean Harlow Museum".
- The Old Black Canyon Highway – The highway was a stagecoach route from Prescott to Phoenix built in 1860, that was known for its rough ride. Part of the highway in Black Canyon City has been paved.
- The Black Canyon City Dog Track – Built in 1967 and abandoned in 1982.

== Historic structures pictured ==
The following are the images of the historic structures in Black Canyon City and its surrounding areas.

Historic structures in Black Canyon City, Arizona

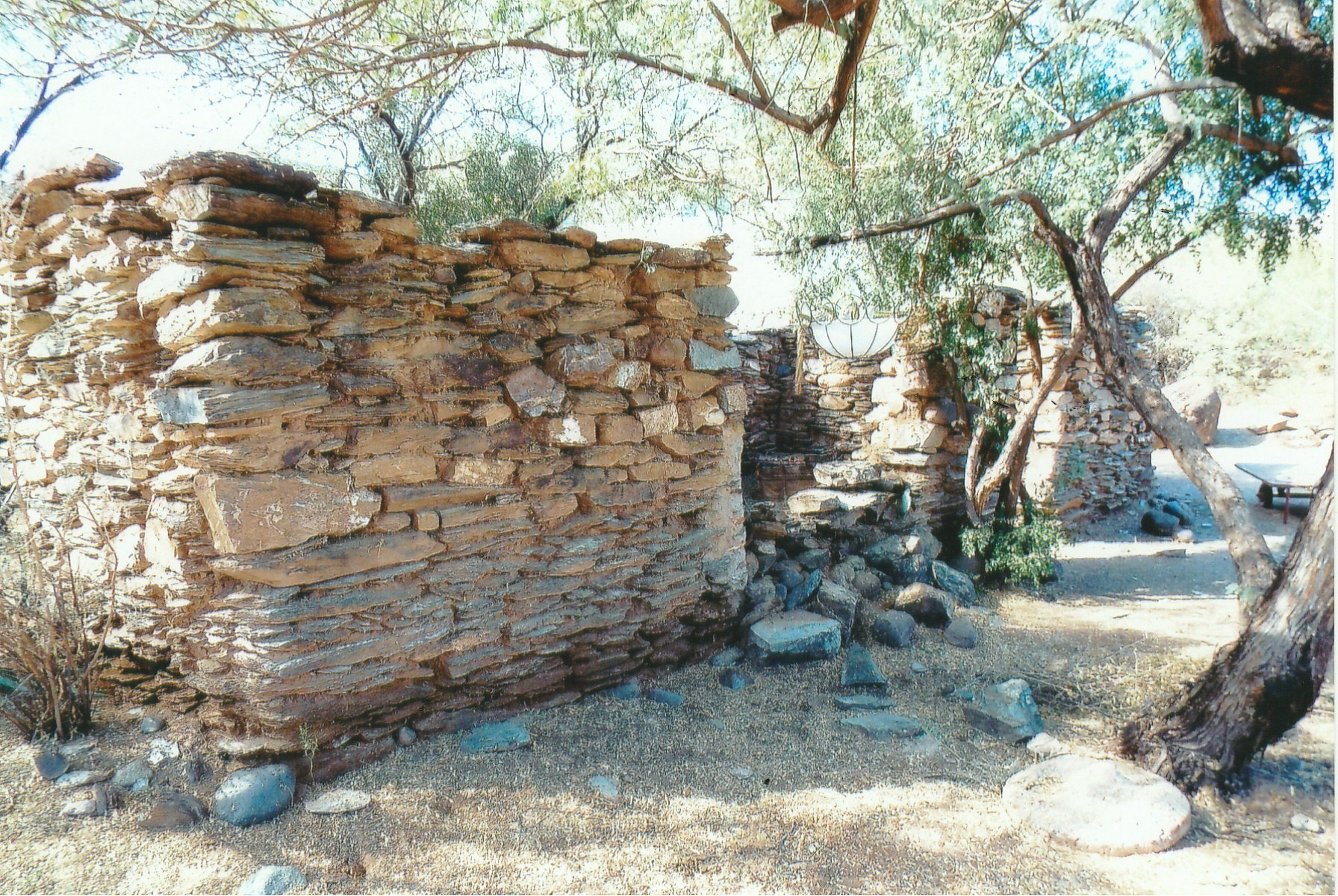
The 1868 Jack and Trinidad Swilling residence.

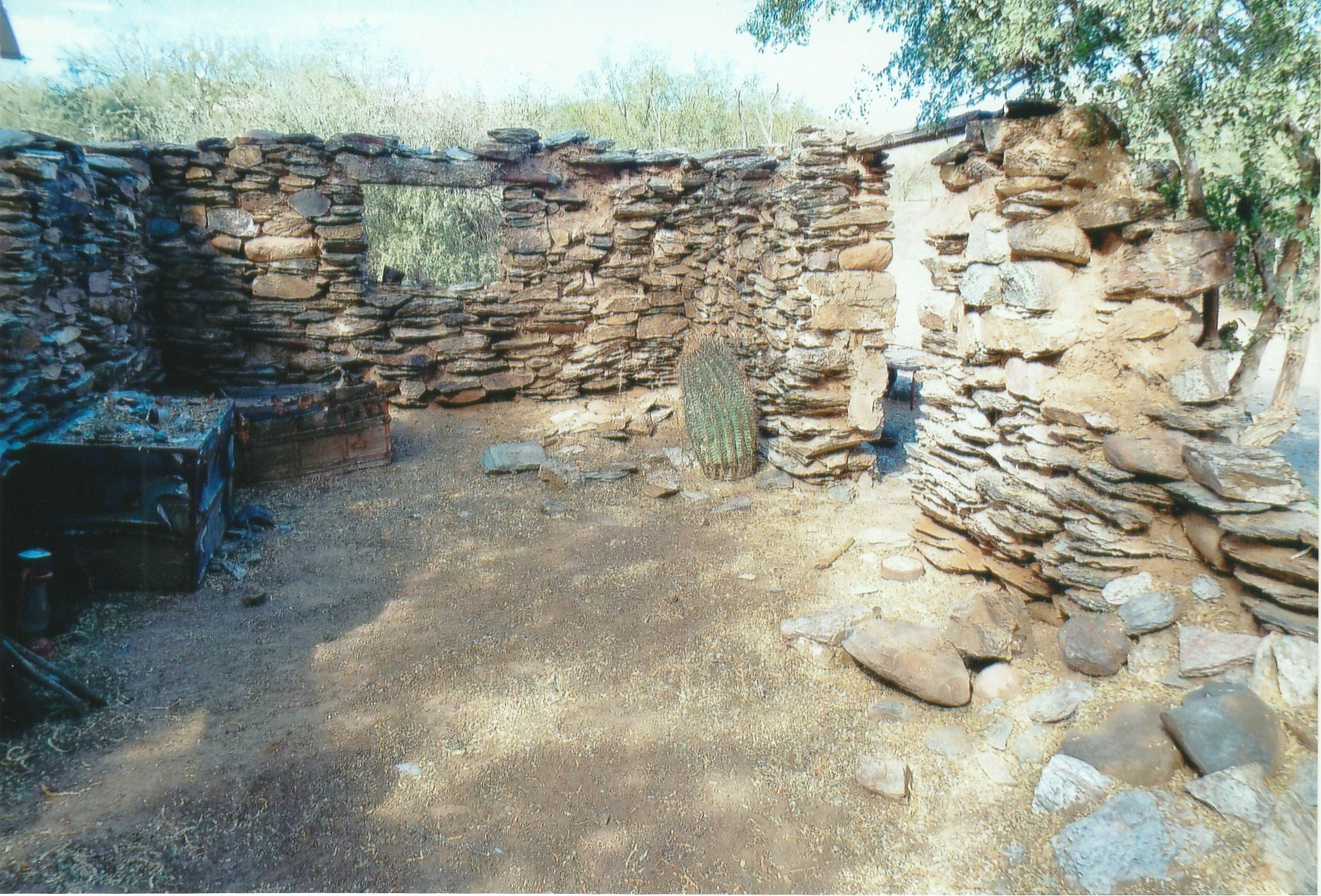
Inside the Swilling residence.

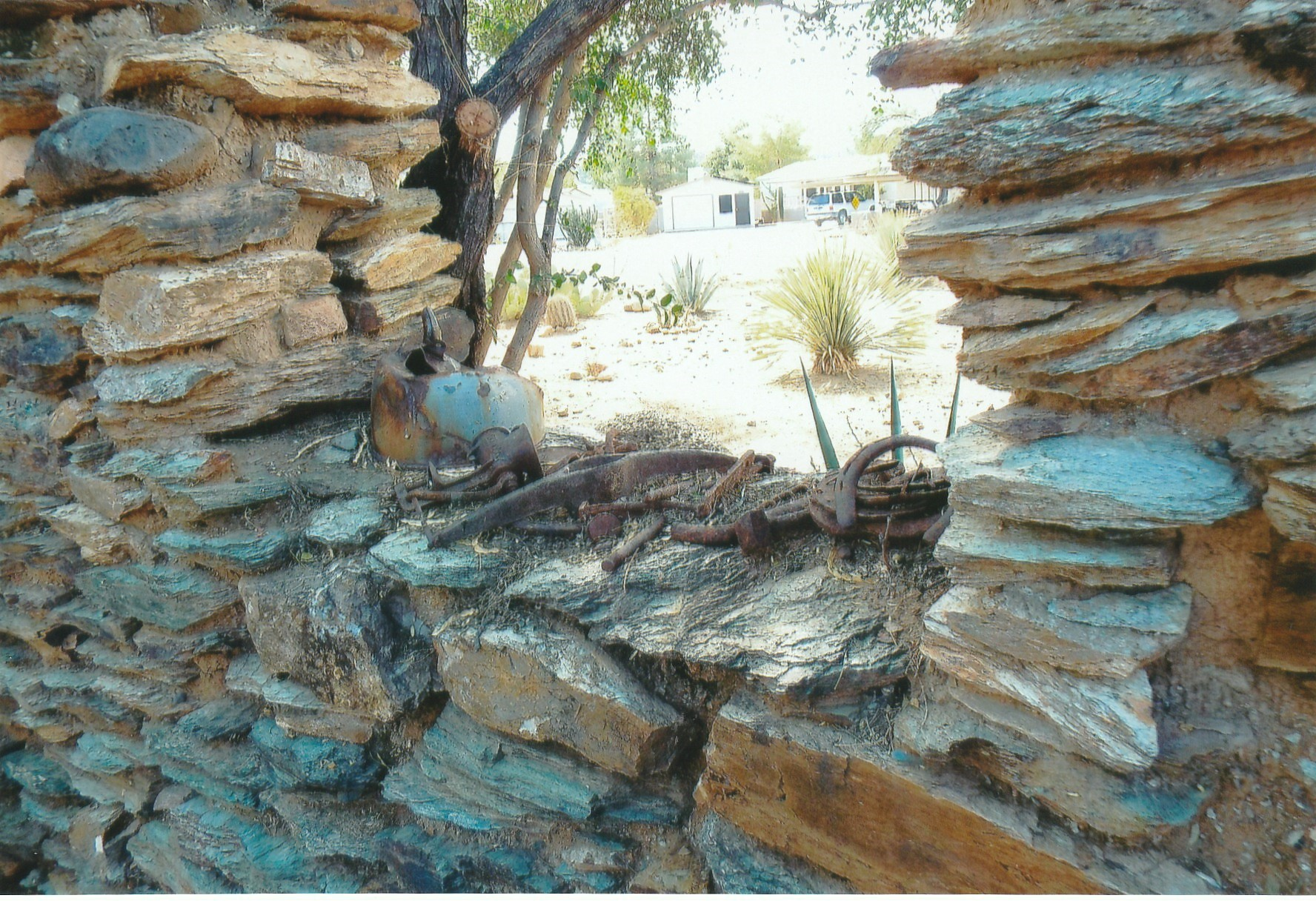
Different view inside the Swilling residence.

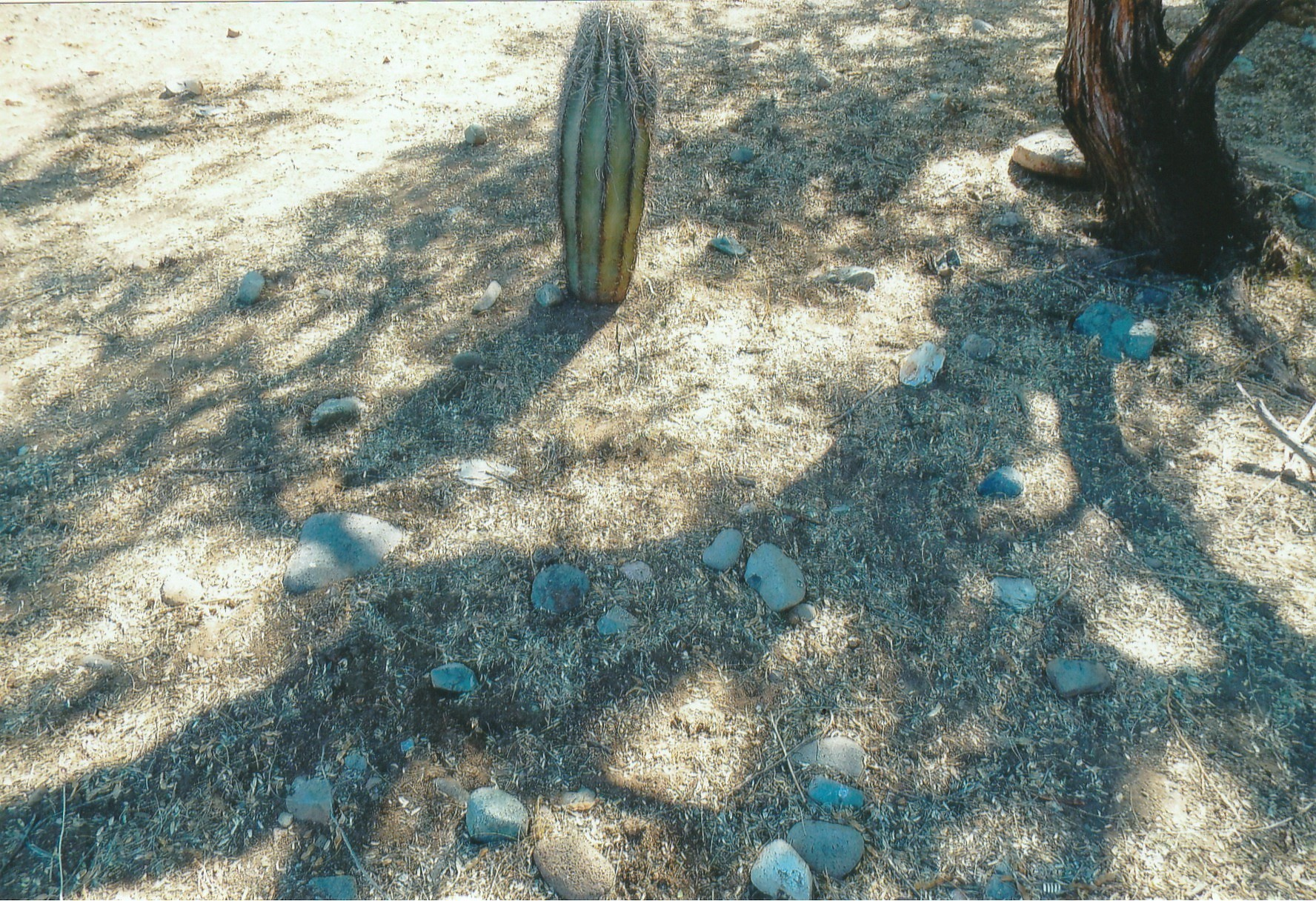
Grave of Col. Jacob Snively

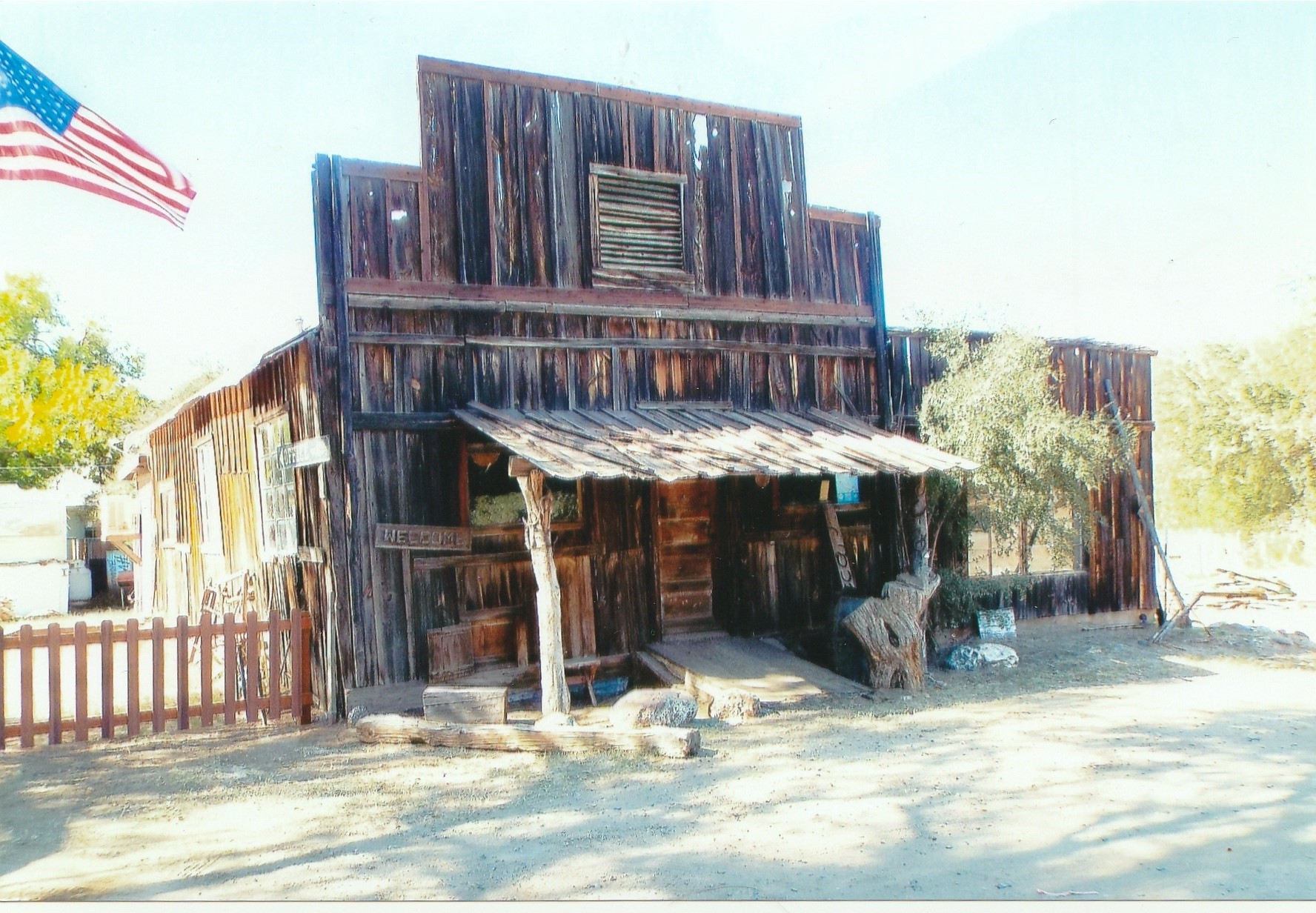
Wells Fargo Stage Stop – 1872.

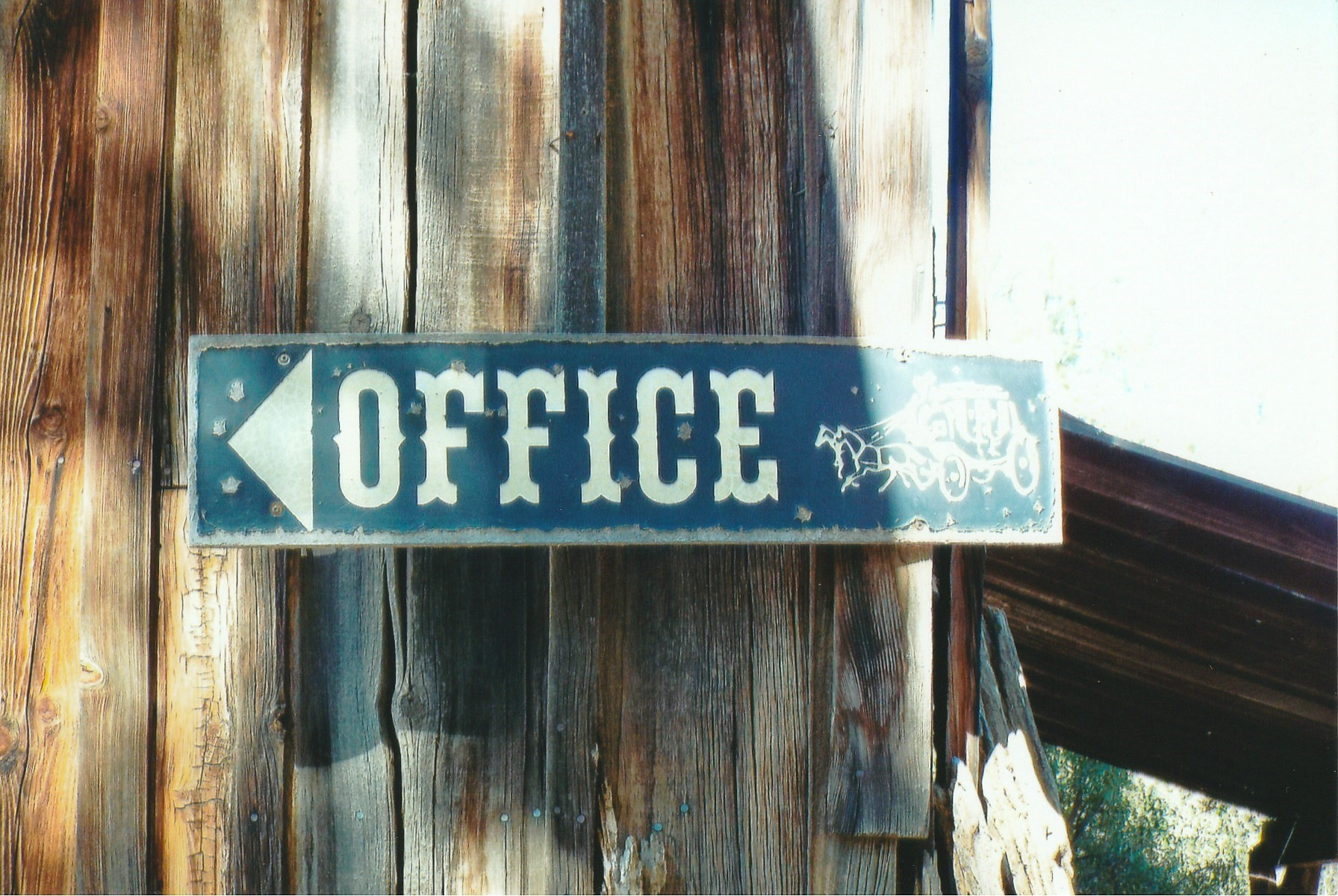
Wells Fargo Stage Stop office sign.

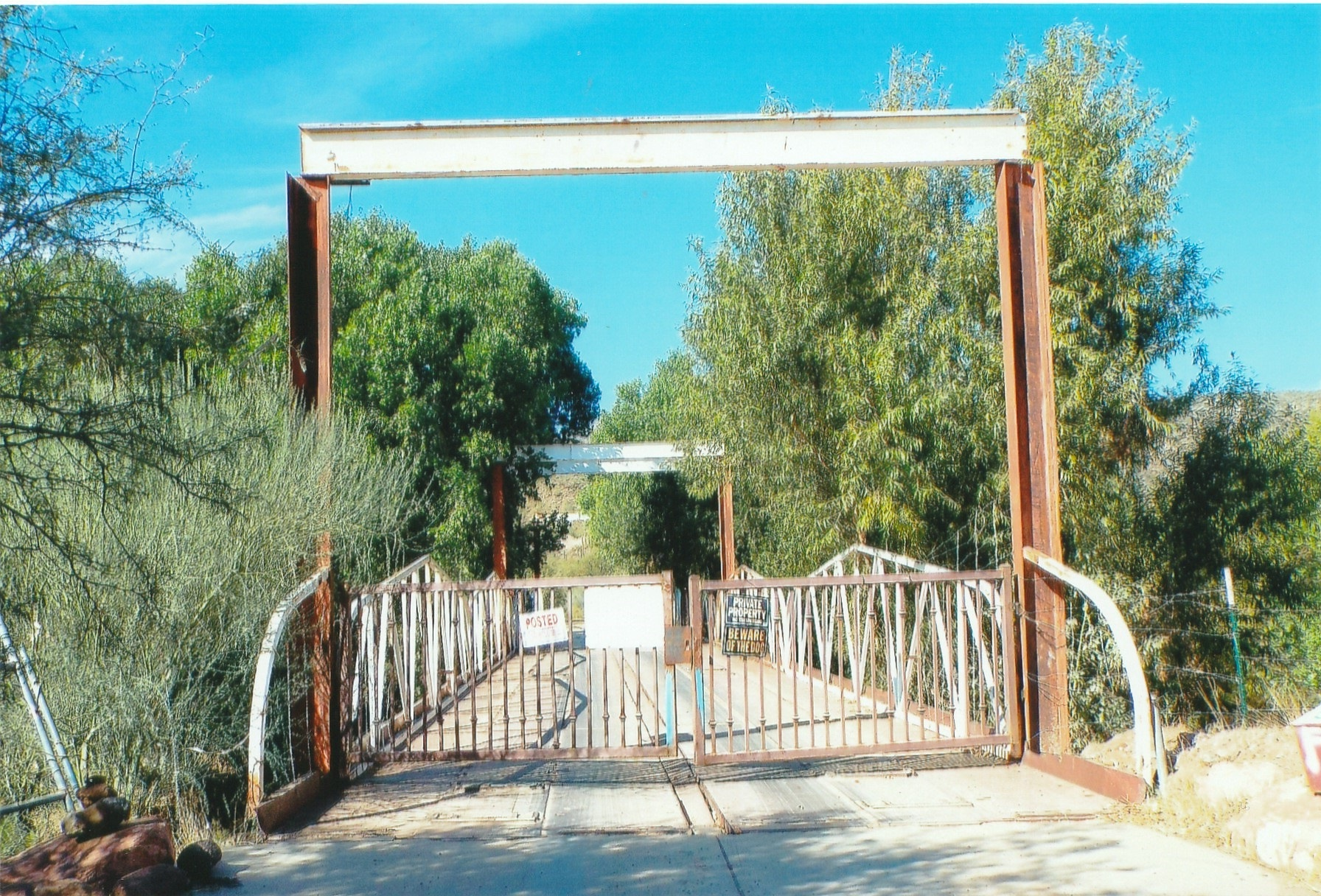
Maggie Mine Bridge – 1870s.

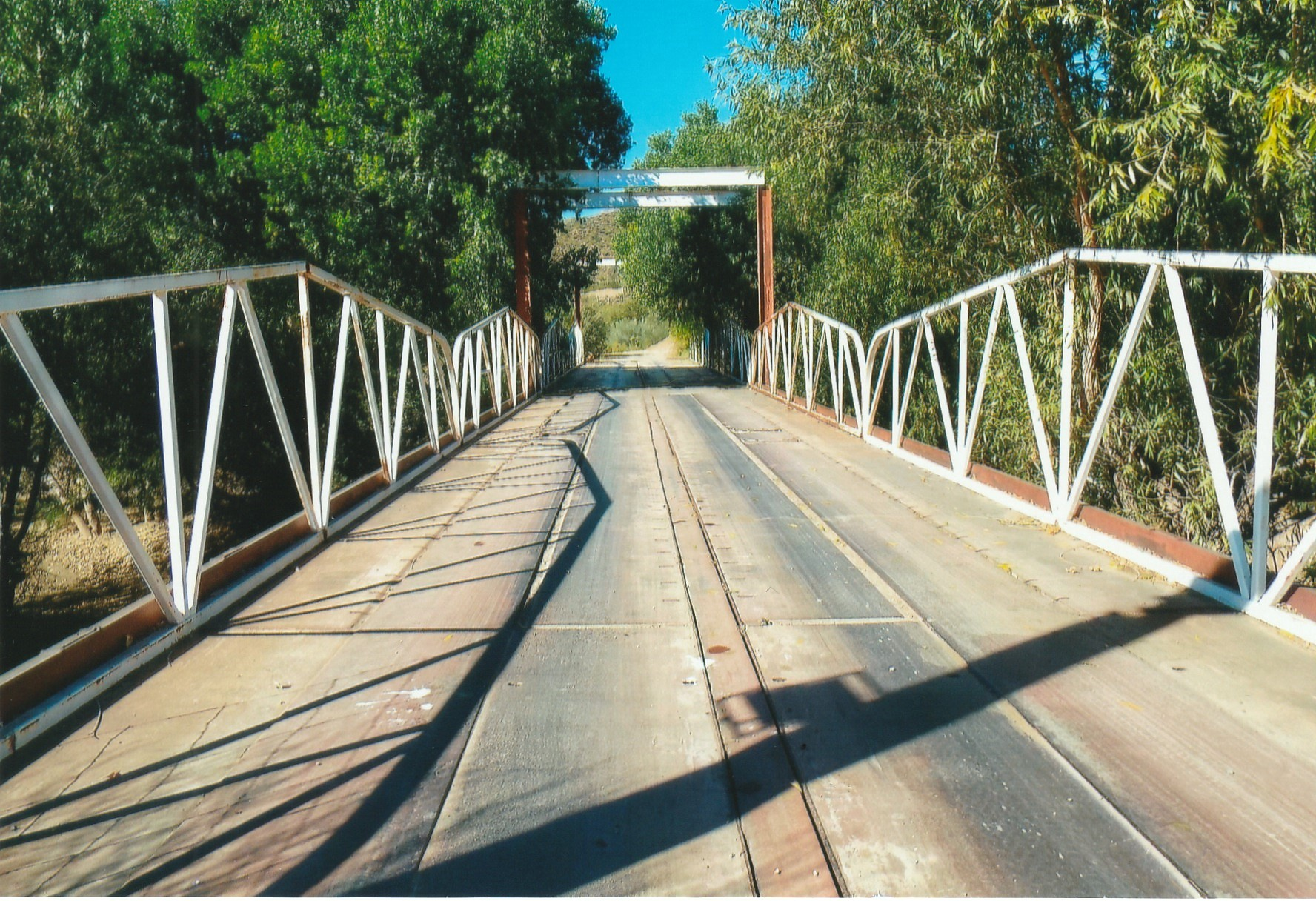
Maggie Mine Bridge over Black Canyon Creek.

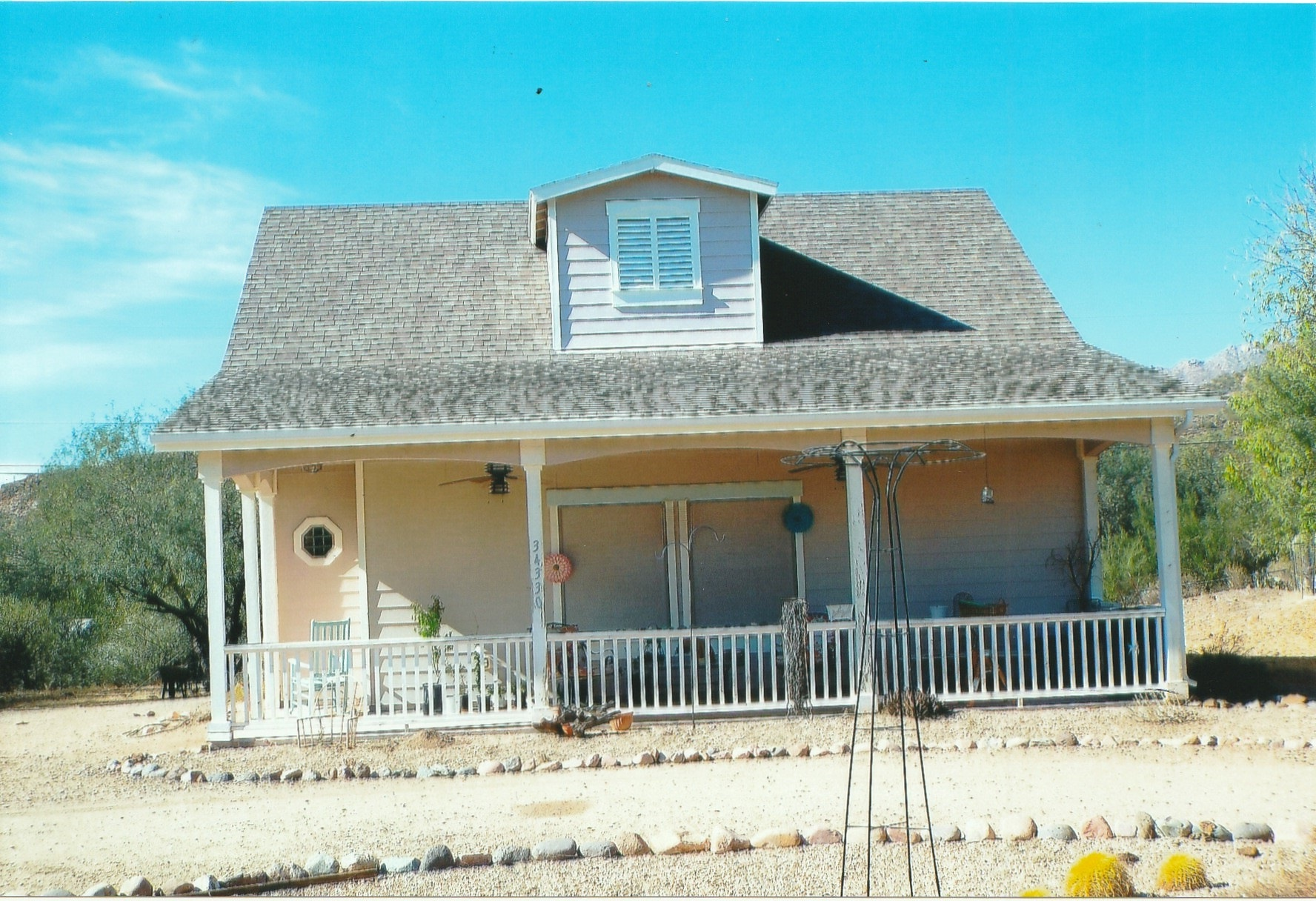
Vernacular House – 1885.

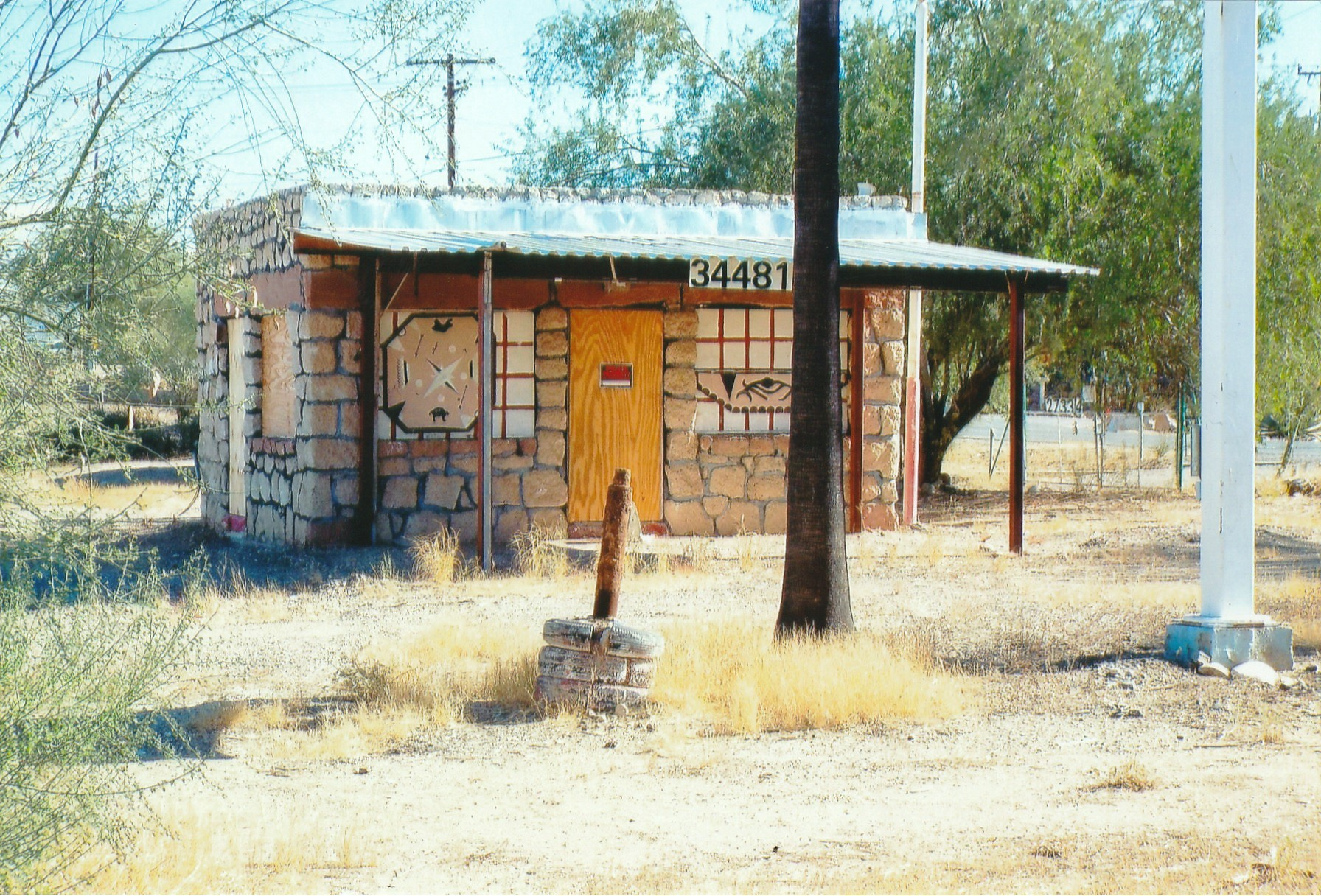
Early Pioneer Residence – 1894.

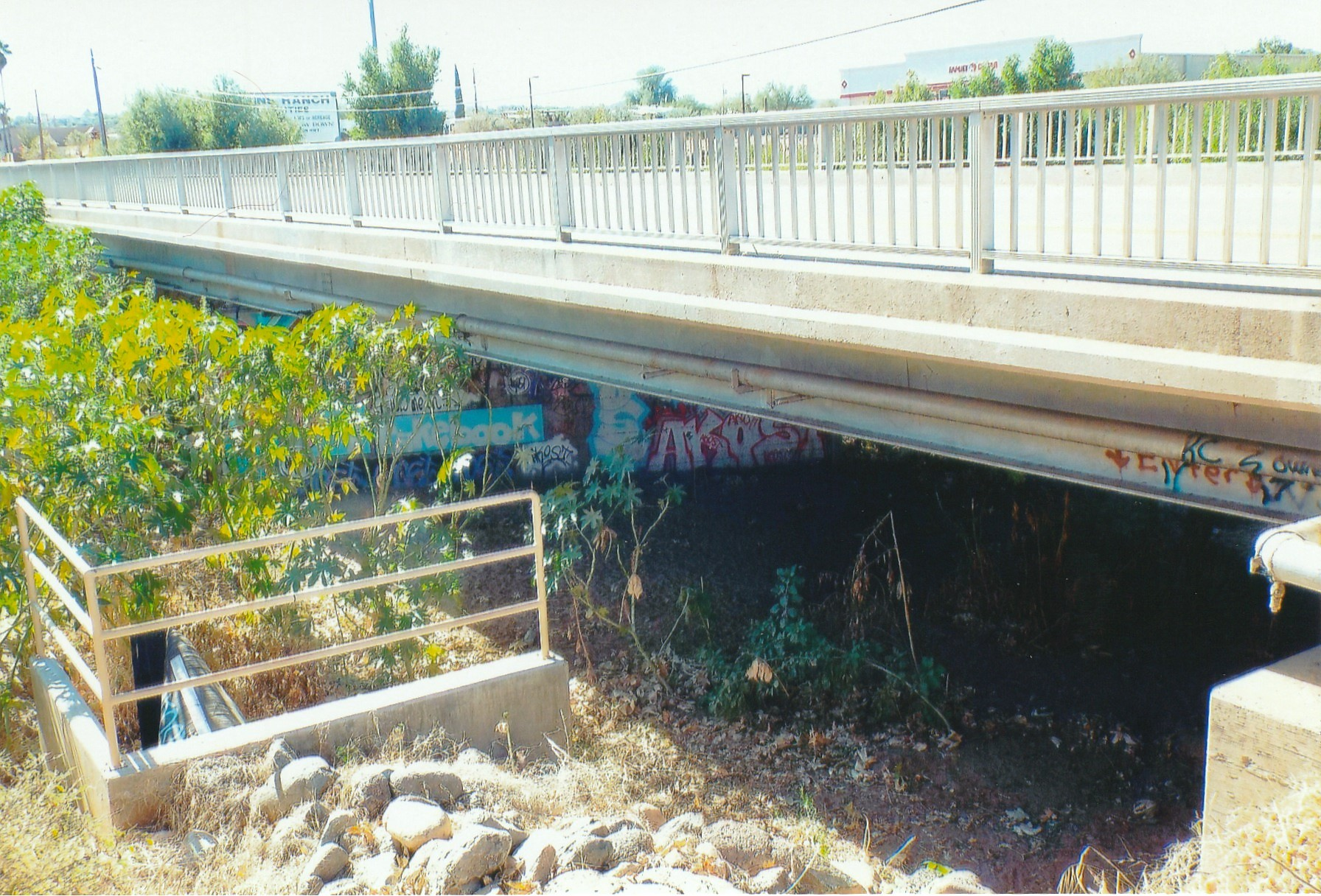
Black Canyon City Bridge – 1925.

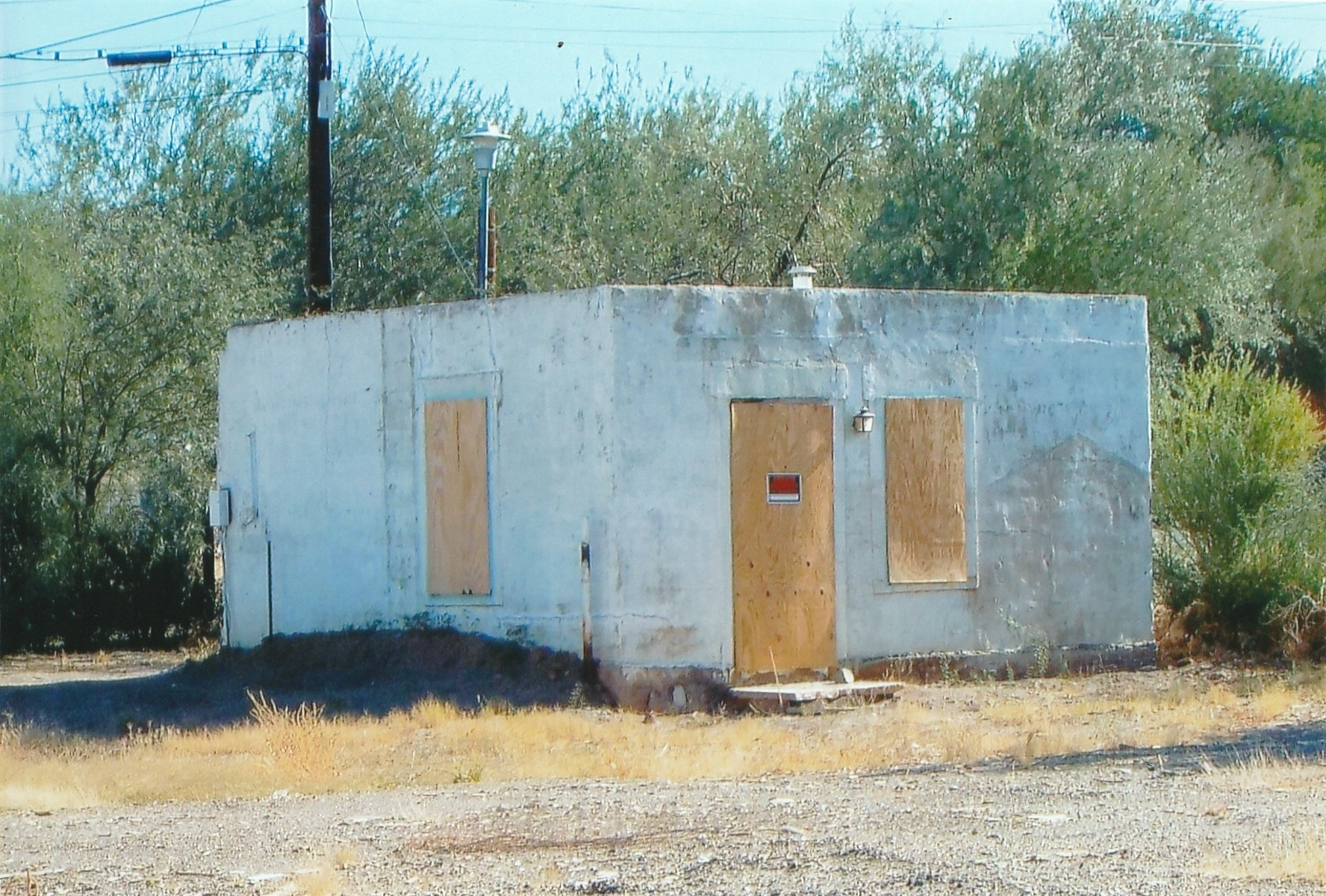
Abandoned Store Building – 1900.

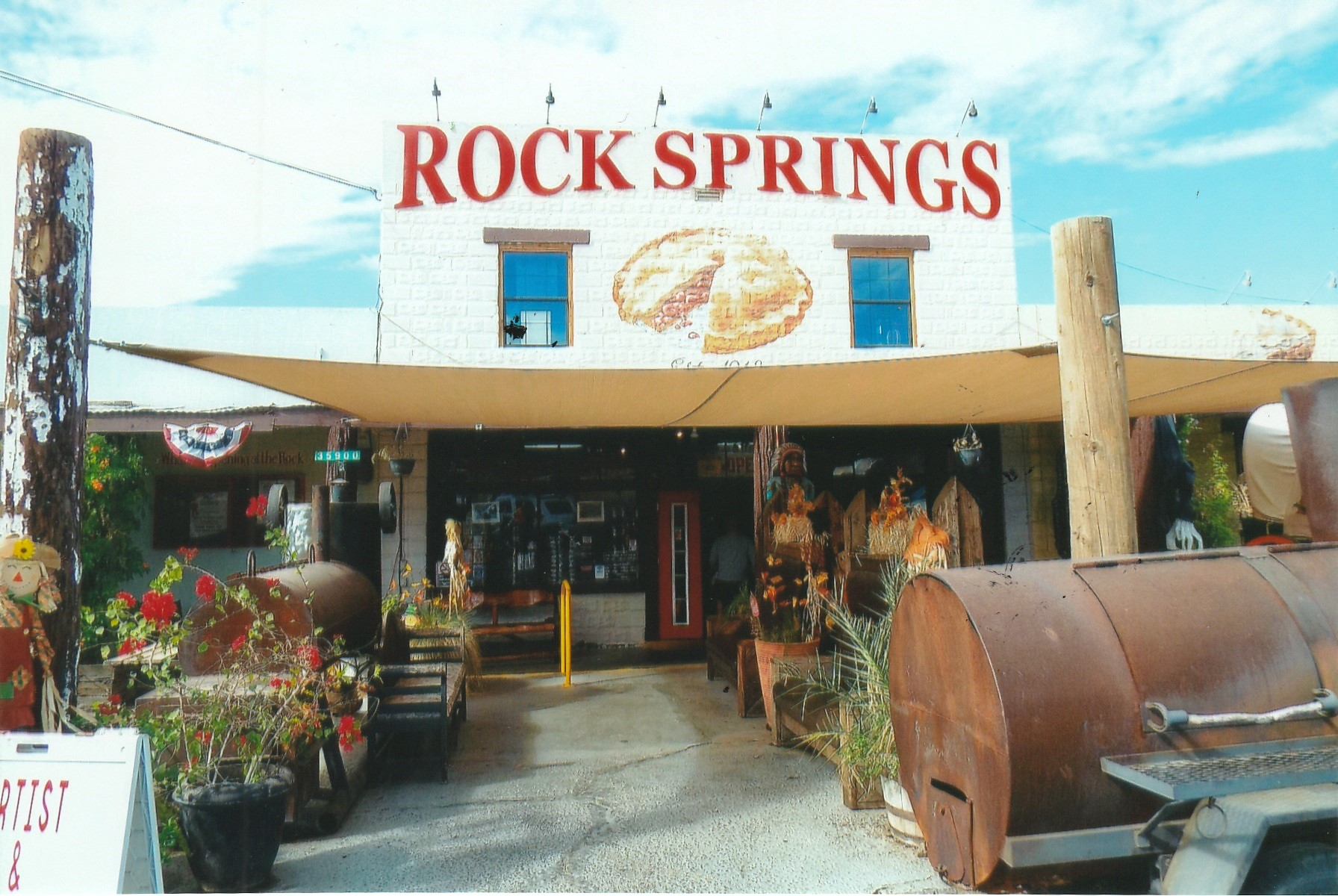
The Rock Springs Hotel (now the "Rock Springs Cafe) – 1918.

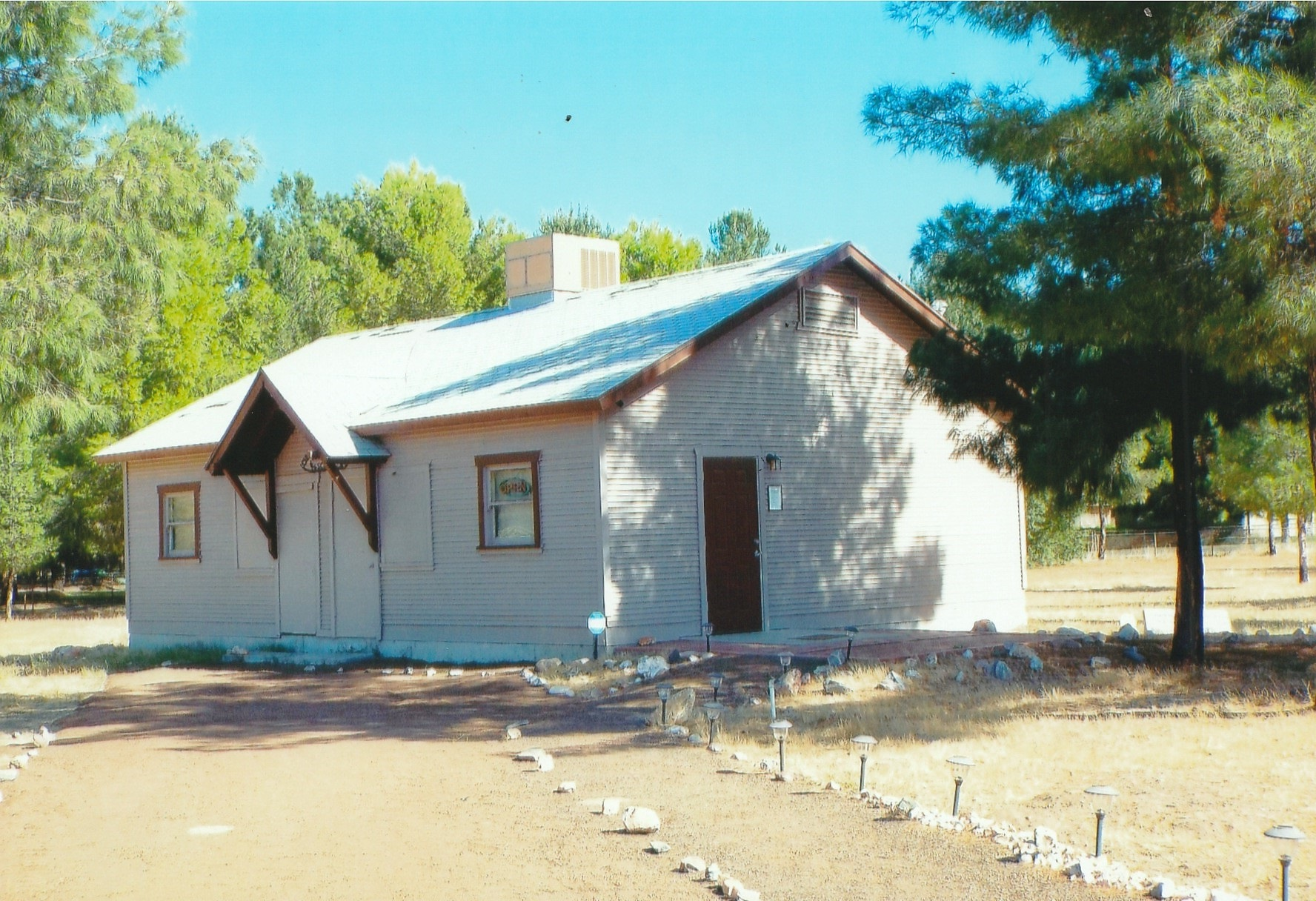
Black Canyon City School House – 1926.

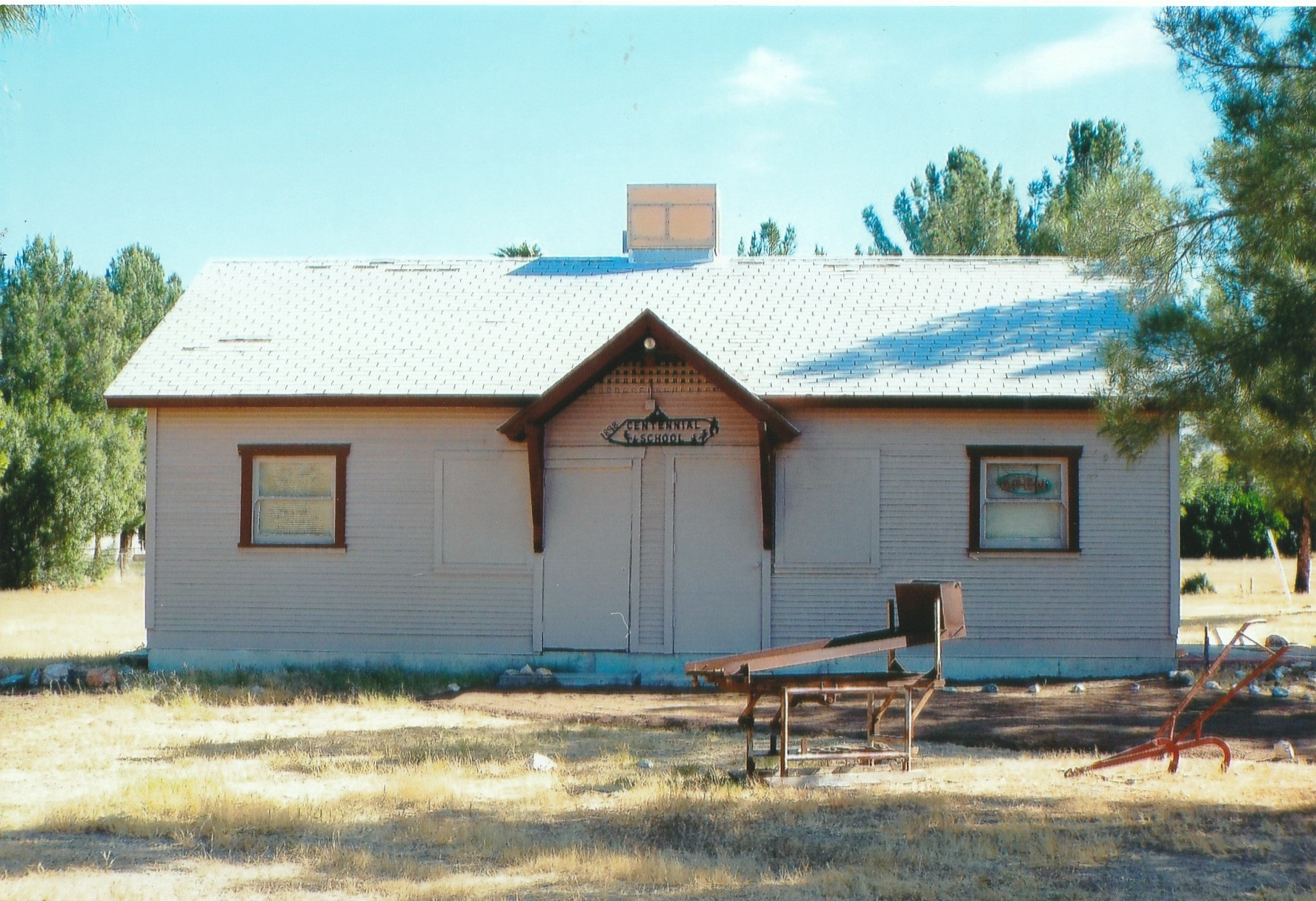
Front view of the Black Canyon City School House – 1926.

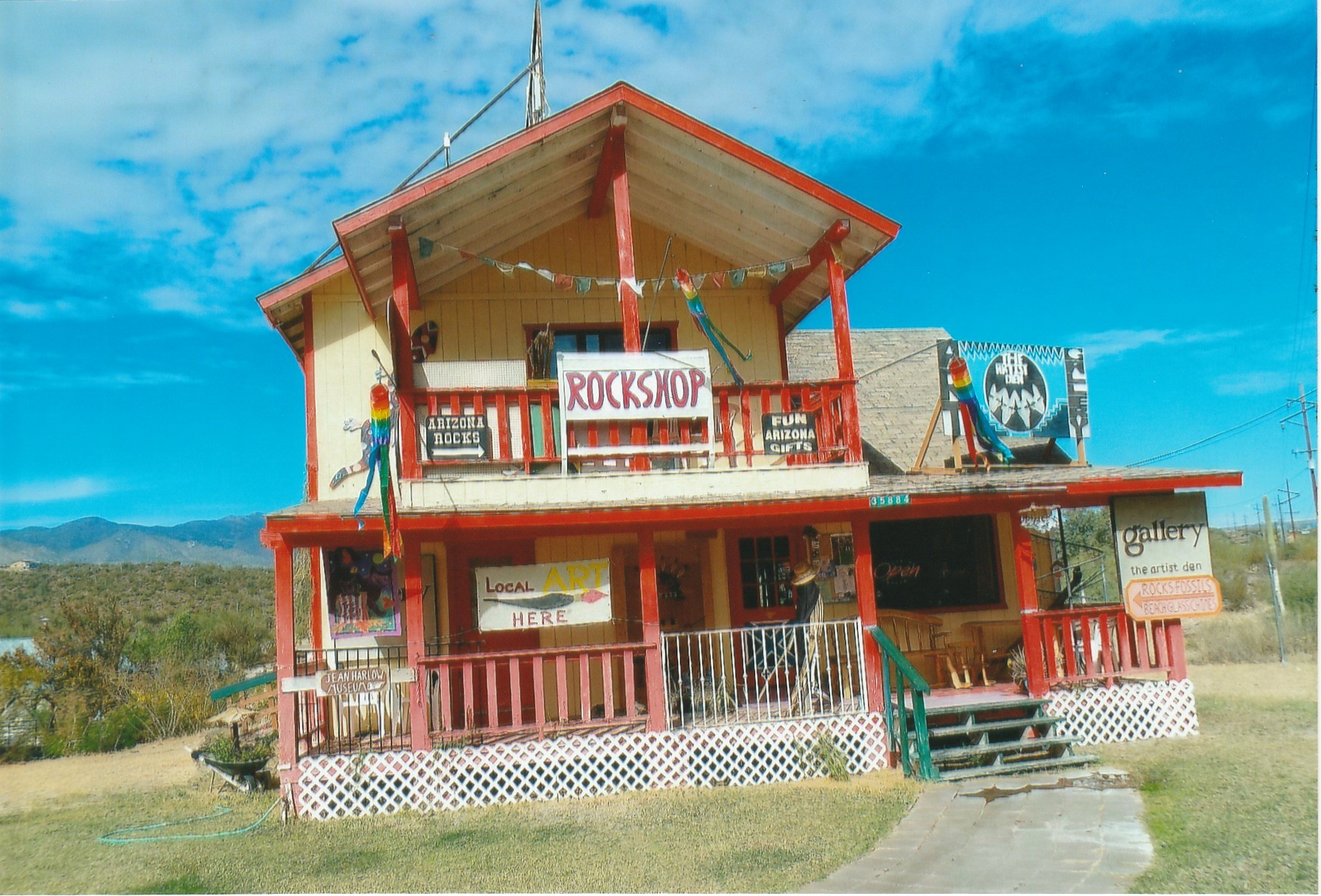
"A" Frame House (the "Jean Harlow Museum") – 1950.

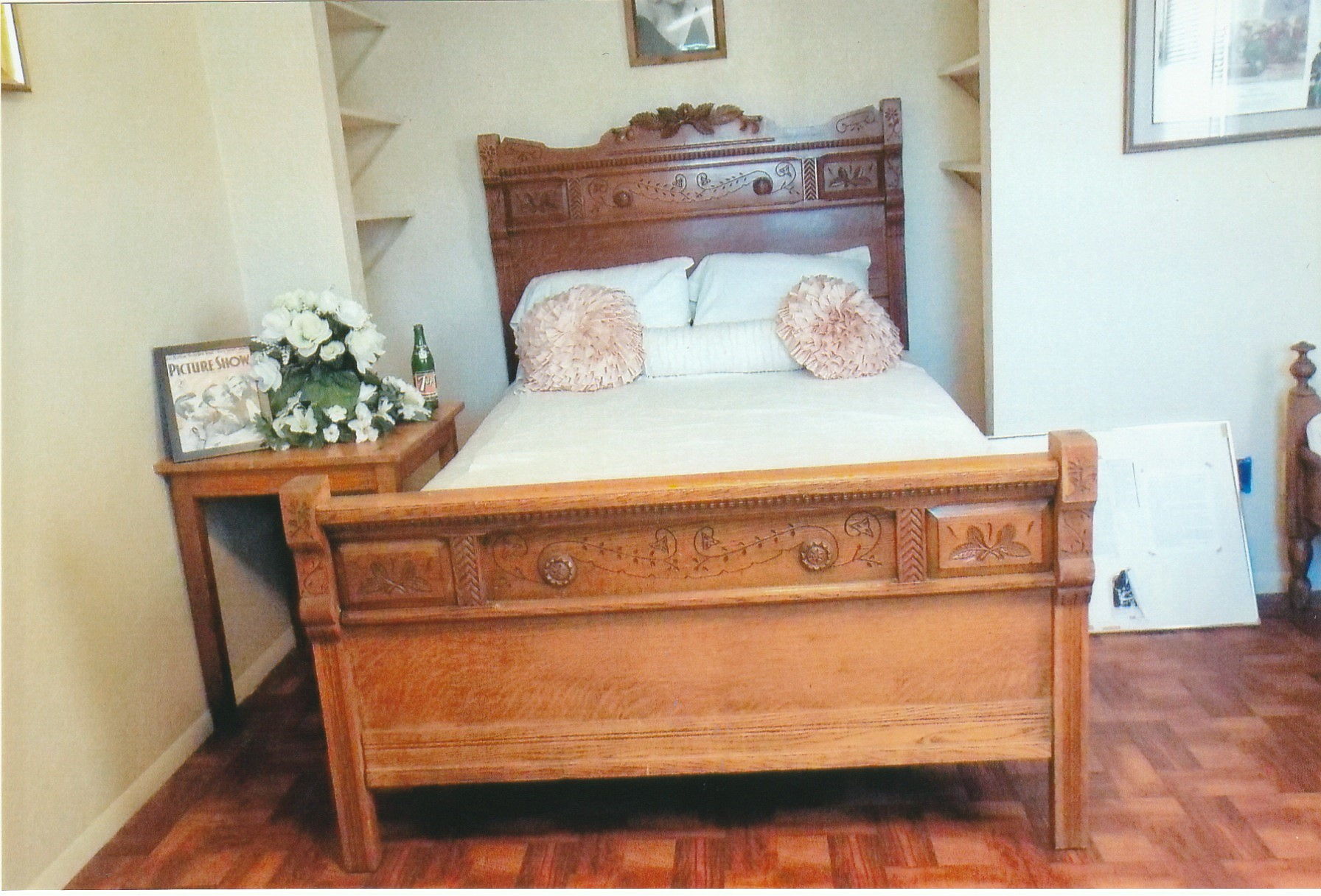
Jean Harlow's bed on exhibit in the museum.

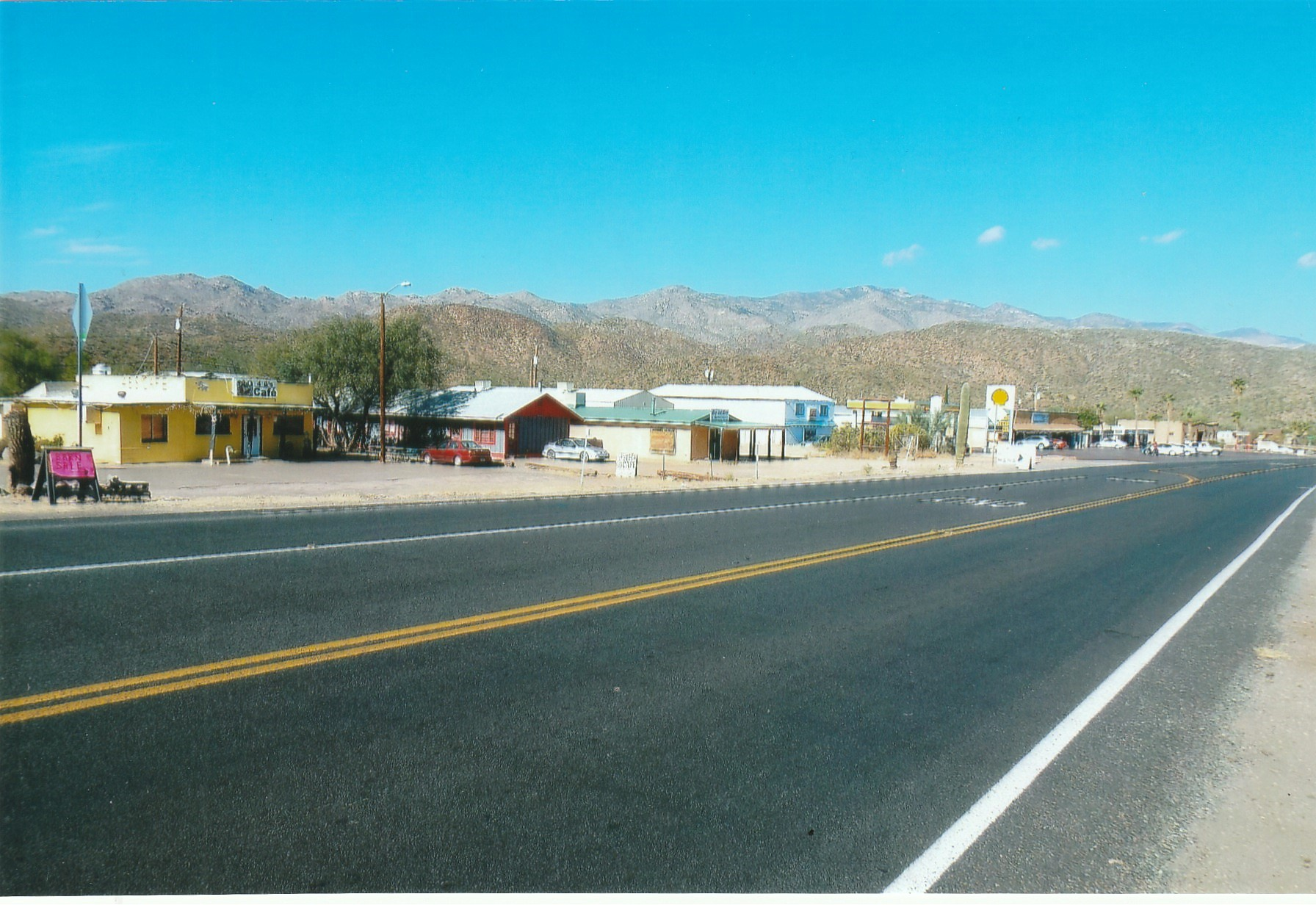
The paved section of the Old Black Canyon Hwy which was originally built in 1860.

=== Black Canyon Dog Track ===
The Black Canyon City Dog Track was built in 1967, and closed in the summer of 1982. No one knows the exact reason of why the track ceased its operations. The closure of the track is surrounded by mysteries and rumors.

Black Canyon City Dog Track

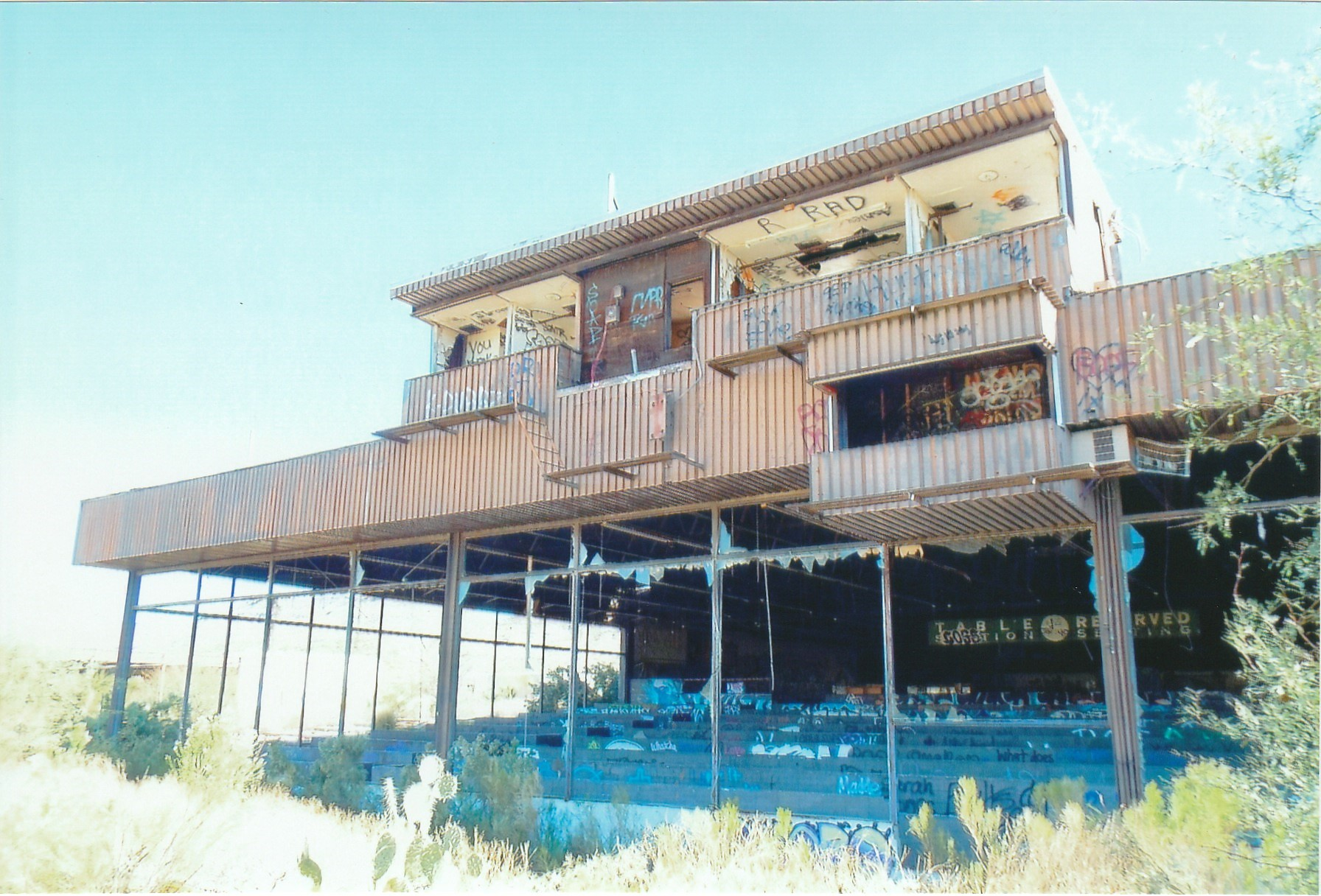
Black Canyon City Dog Track.

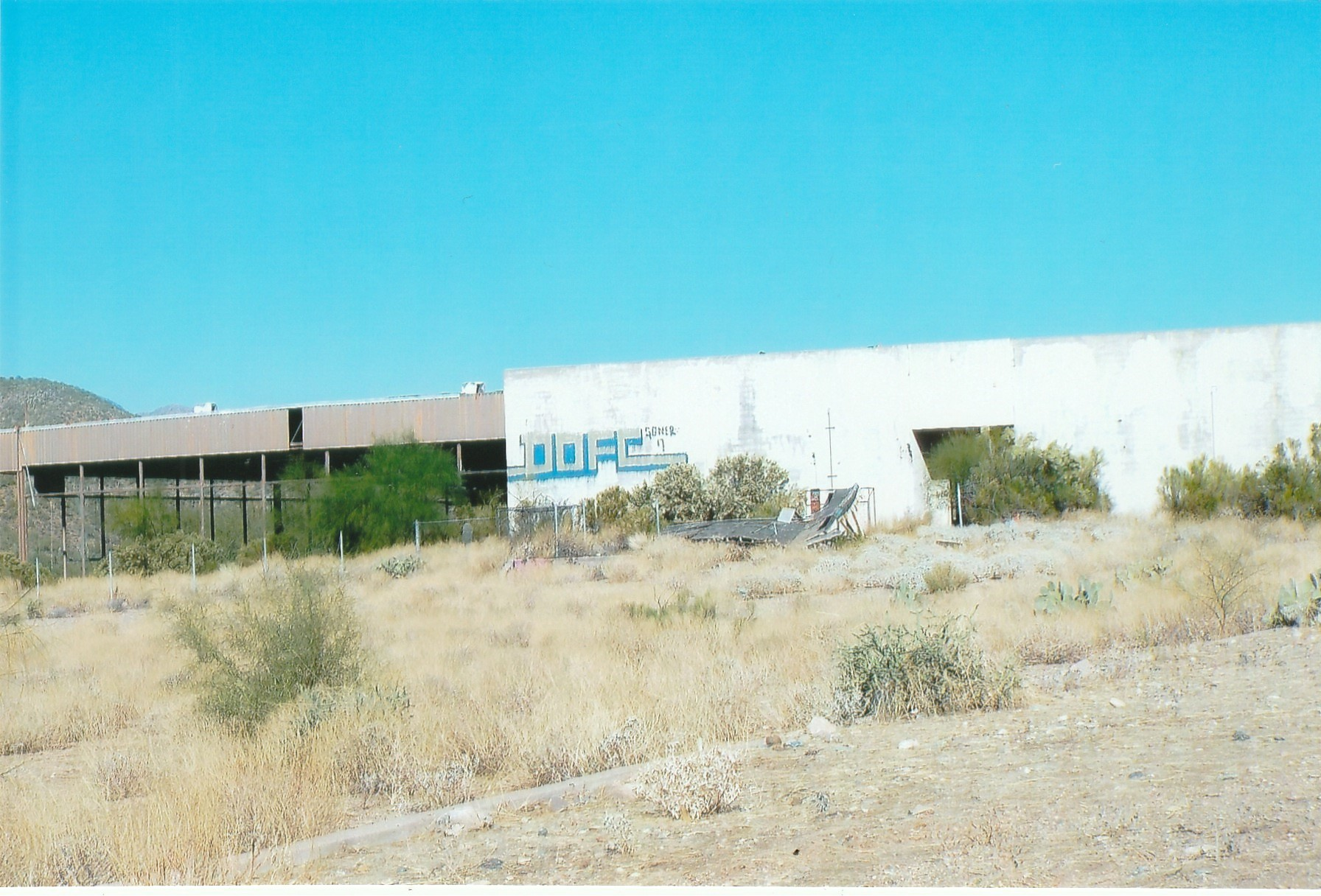
Black Canyon City Dog Track building.

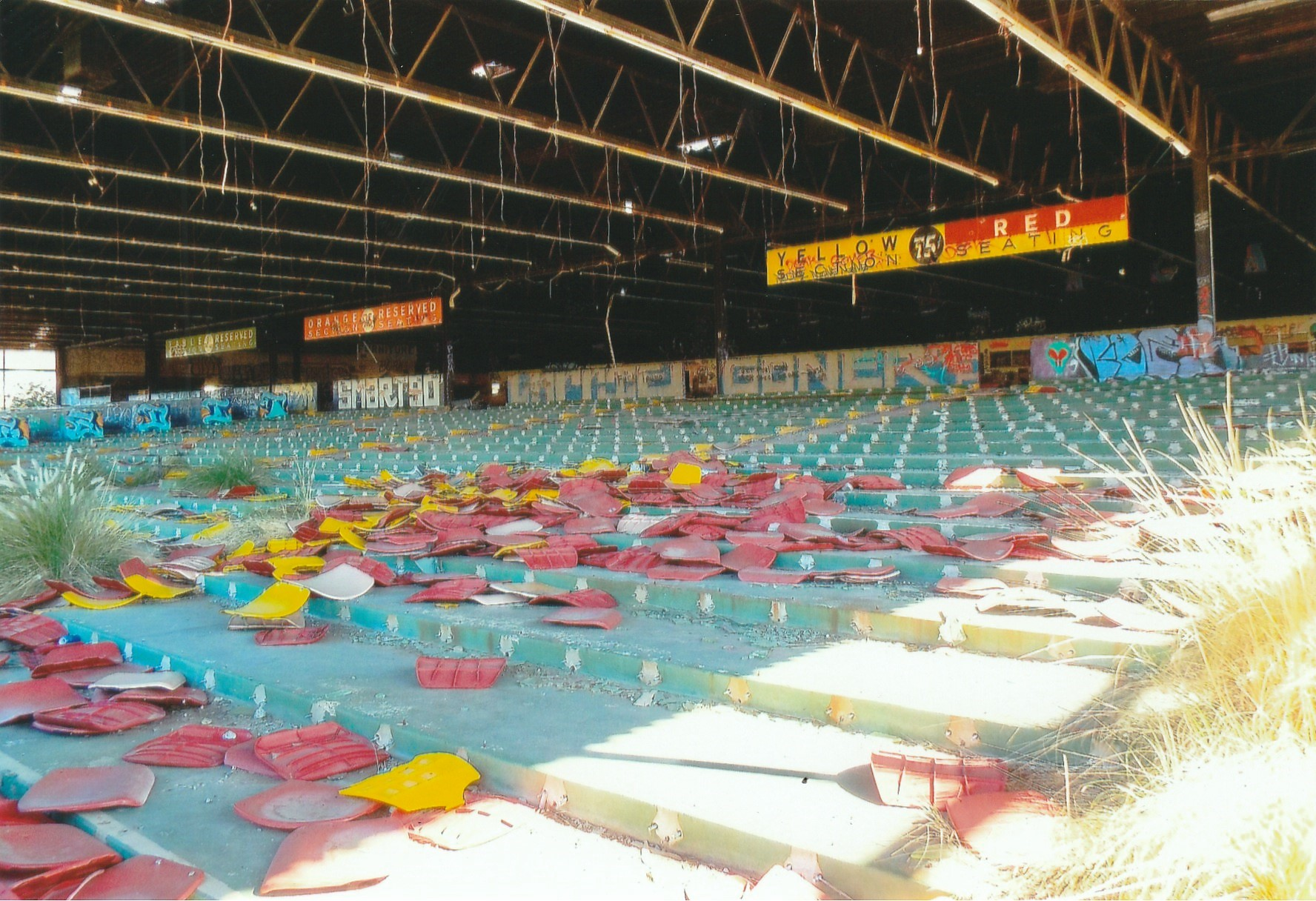
Stadium seating area.

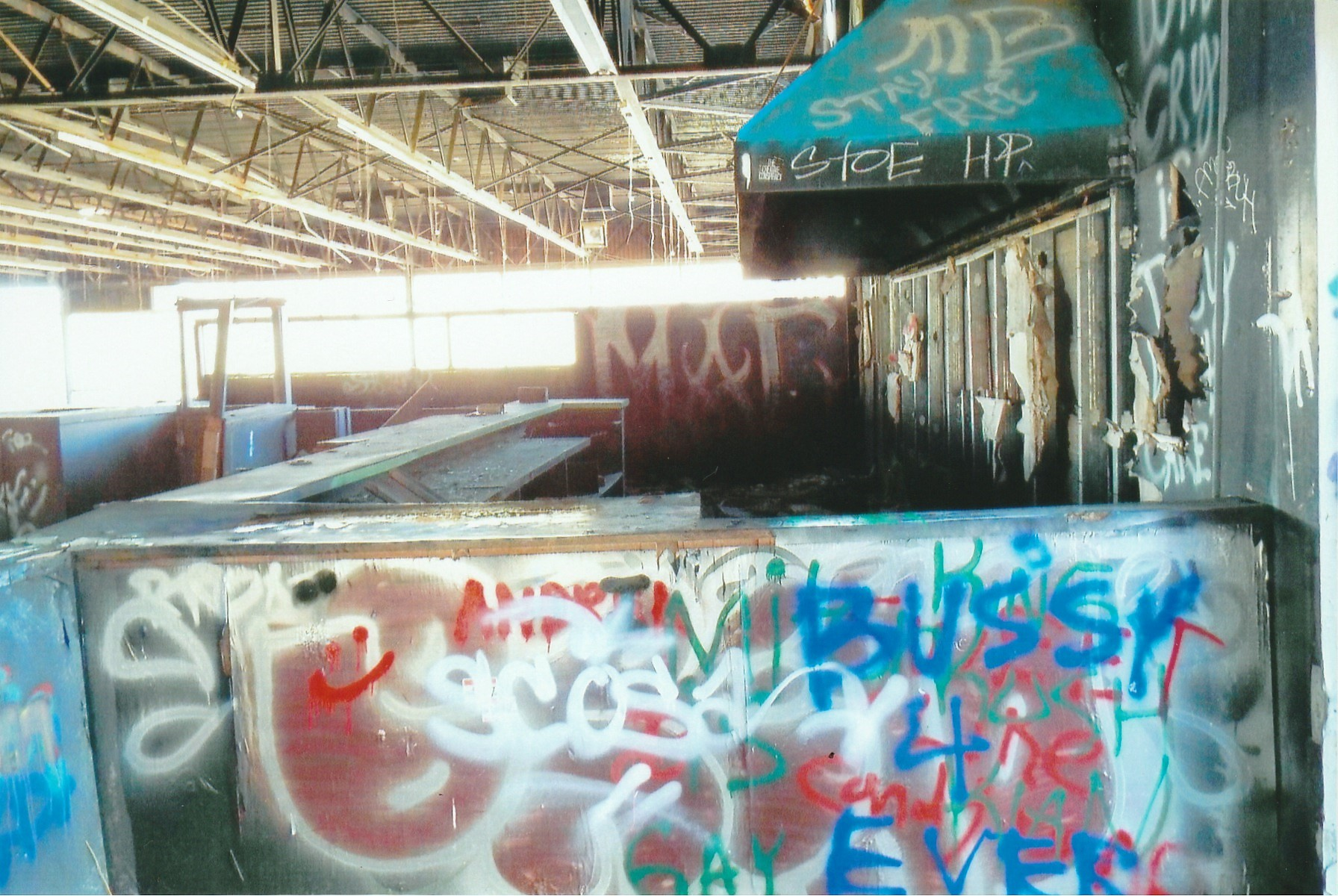
Bar

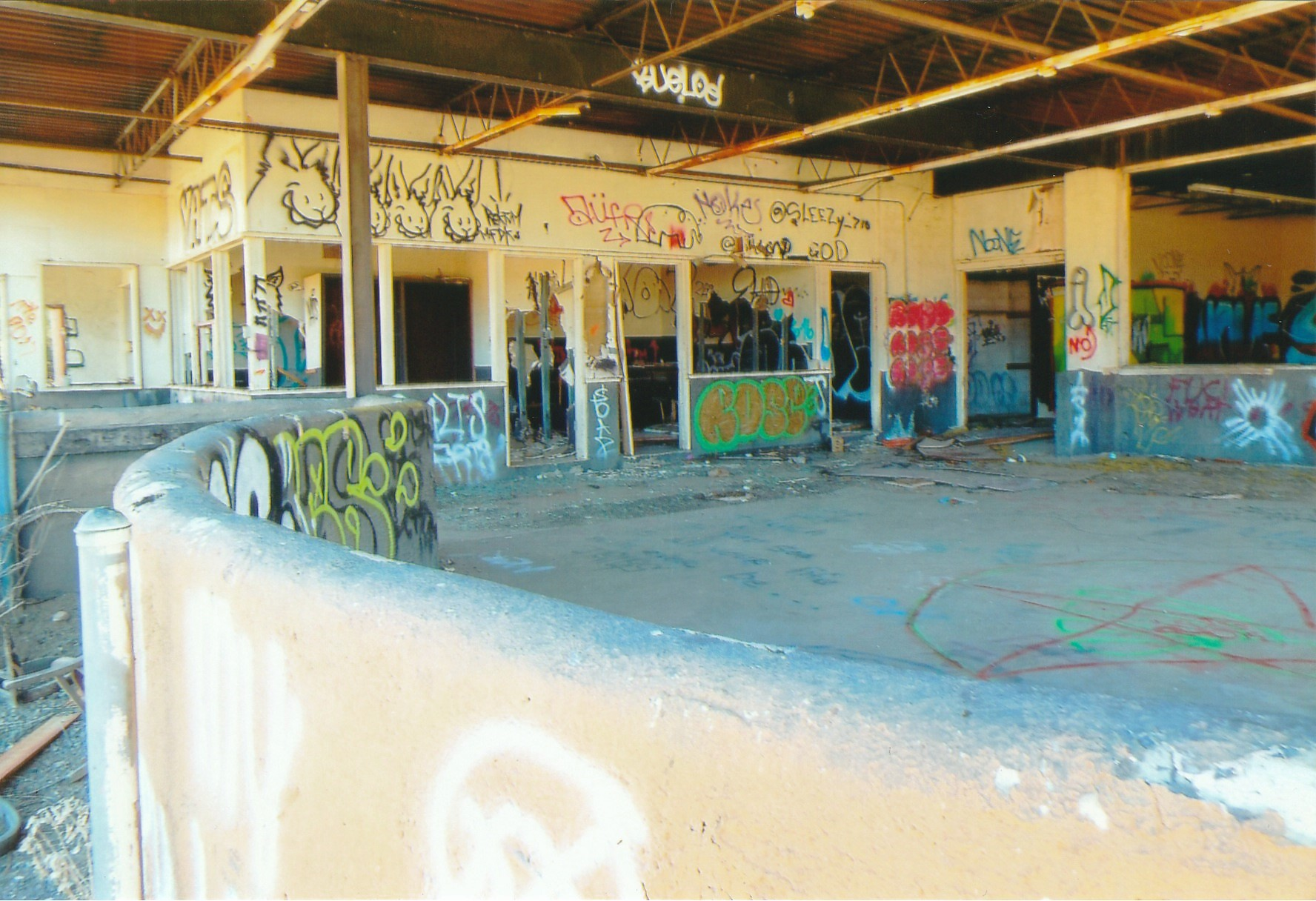
Betting area

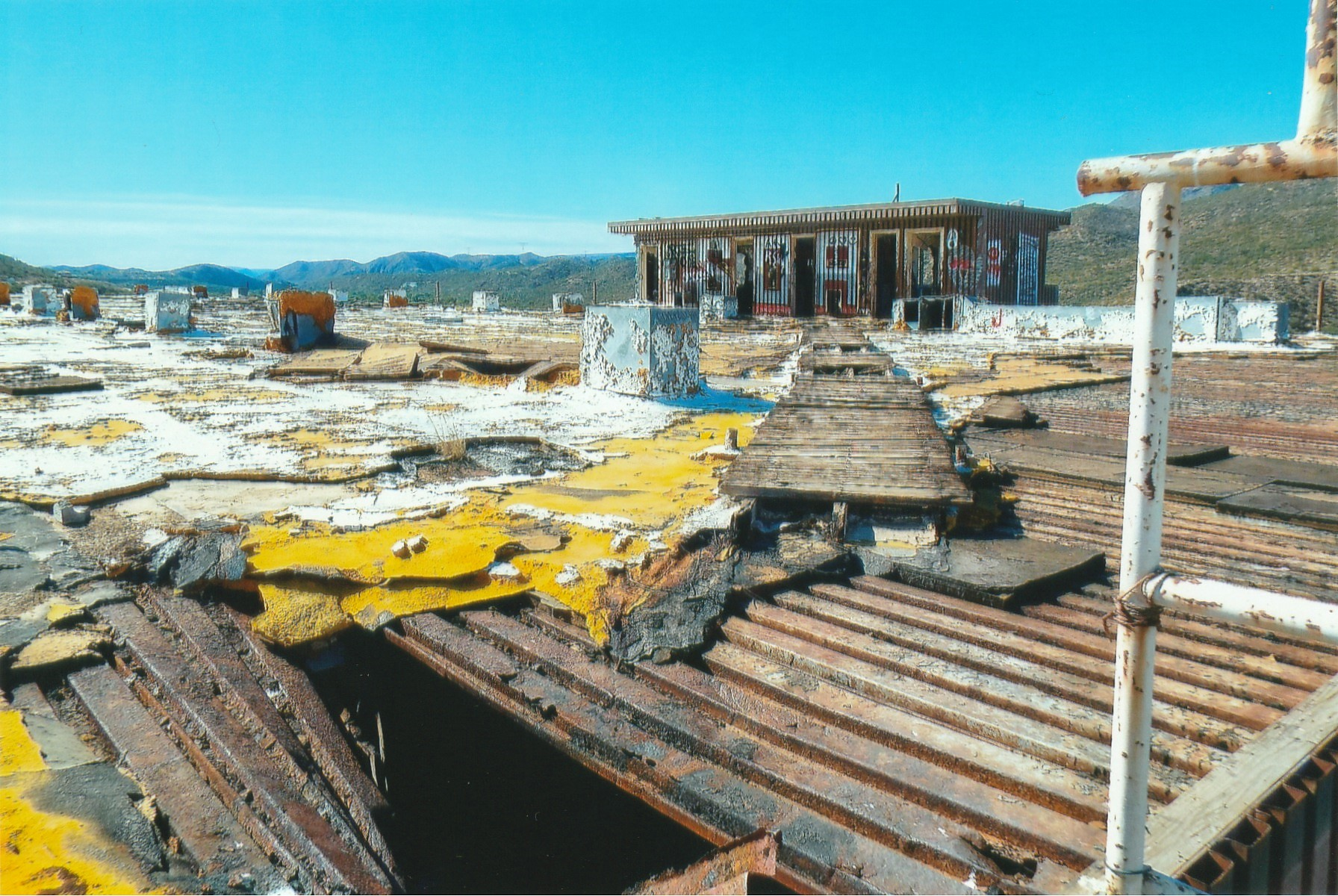
Condition of stadium roof.

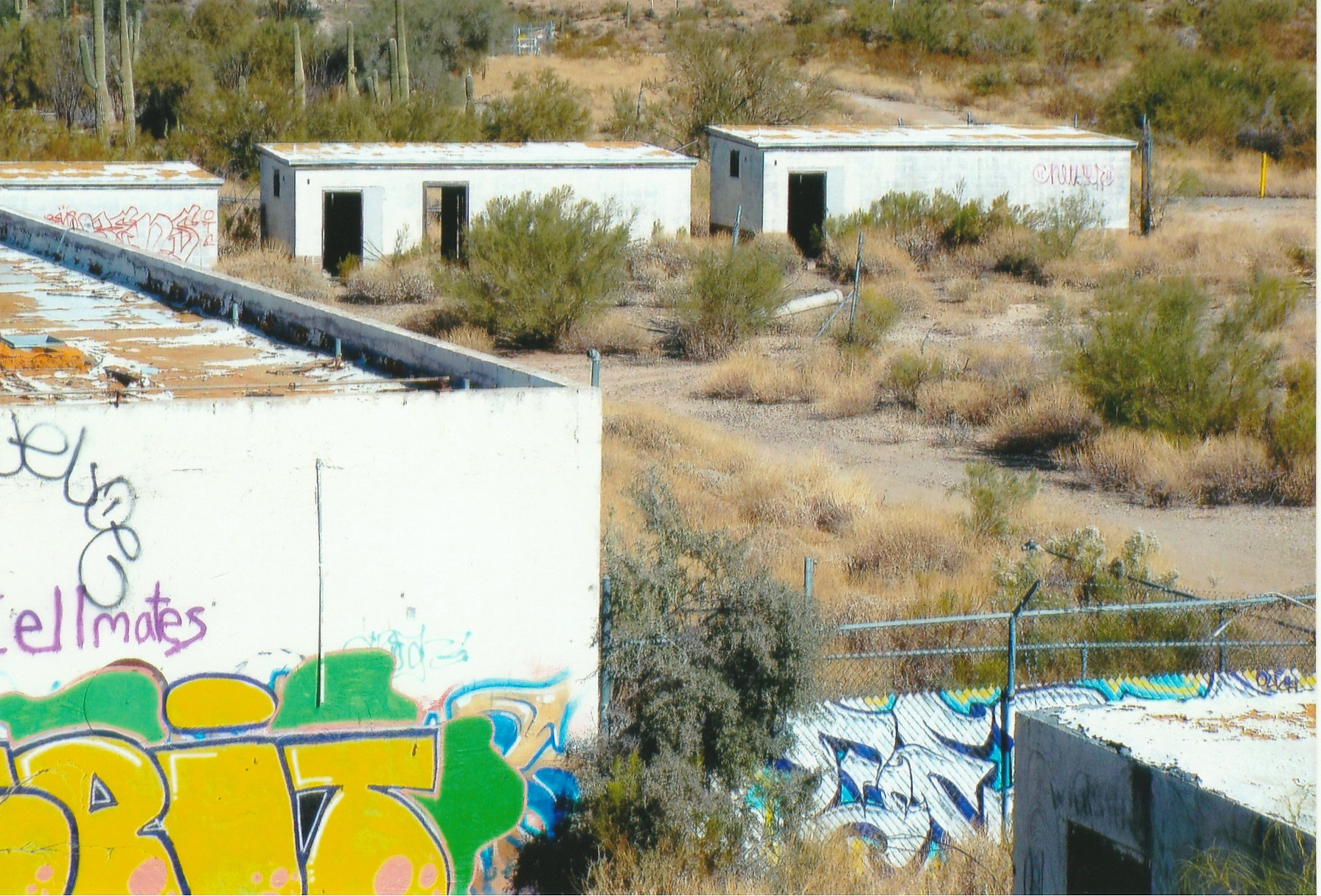
Structures where the Greyhounds were kept.

== See also ==
- Black Canyon City
- National Register of Historic Places listings in Yavapai County, Arizona
