= Rock Springs Cafe =

Restaurant in Arizona

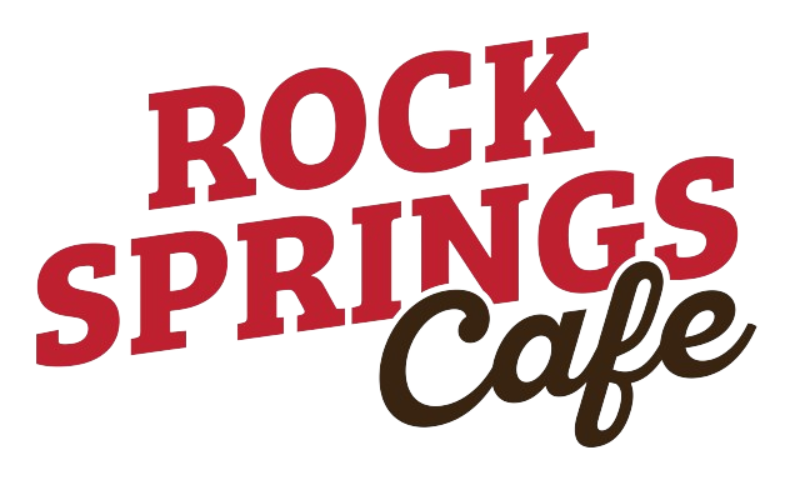

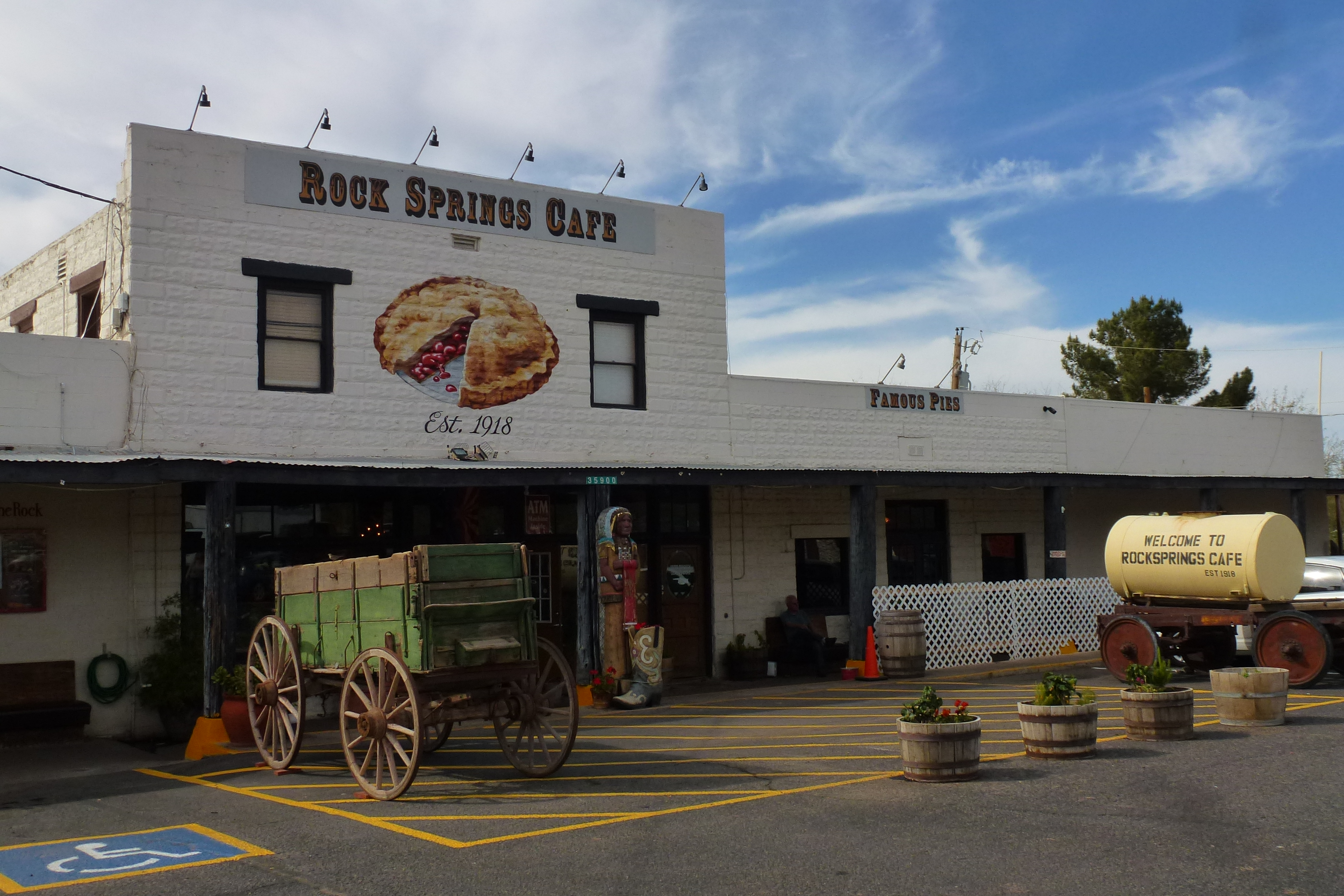
- The restaurant in 2013

- Location within Arizona Rock Springs Cafe (the United States)

Restaurant information
- Established: 1918
- Owner: Augie Perry
- Food type: Southwestern
- Location: 35900 Old Black Canyon Hwy, Black Canyon City, AZ 85324
- Coordinates: 34.0486°N 112.1492°W
- Website: rockspringscafe.com

The Rock Springs Cafe is a restaurant and rest stop in Black Canyon City, Arizona, along the I-17 highway. Founded in 1918, it is a popular area for locals and tourists and serves Southwestern dishes. It is one of the oldest restaurants in Arizona.

== History ==
The building the restaurant is located in was originally built in 1918 by Ben Warner as a general store for motorists passing through the area when traveling from Prescott to Phoenix. The location is near a natural spring source. He opened a hotel nearby in 1924. The general store may have sold alcohol illegally during the Prohibition era as a copper still was found in the building's attic. Rock Springs continued to develop more as the 20th century passed, with the hotel and store staying open and being the residence for Warner's family. The Goldwater family, Tom Mix, John and Cindy McCain, Matthew McConaughey, Charlie Sheen, Gary Busey, and Jean Harlow all frequented the area. The area was known on maps as Rock Springs and was the location of the only telephone nearby for a long while. Warner became the postmaster in 1955. The restaurant celebrated its centennial in October 2018 with a music festival. As of 2024, the "village" has grown to include a farmers' market, bakery, art studio, event center, and gas station.

== Menu ==
Rock Springs Cafe has an extensive menu serving courses for all three meals. For breakfast, it offers pancakes, buttermilk biscuits, French toast, bagels, sirloin steak, chicken steak, grits, oatmeal, omelettes, breakfast burritos, parfait, and hash. For lunch, the restaurant serves burgers, melts, cheesesteaks, Reubens, fish and chips, cobb salad, macaroni and cheese, buffalo wings, onion rings, and ribs. During dinner, the menu consists of fried chicken, meatloaf, liver, chicken pot pie, corn on the cob, coleslaw, baked potato, mashed potato, cowboy beans, cornbread, sweet potato fries, pulled pork, and brisket. The restaurant is also known for its homemade pies. There are 21 different pies, with 4 cream, 7 fruit, and 10 specialty. Its signature pie is a Jack Daniel's pecan pie. The pies were first added to the menus in the 1930s, but became popular in the 50s and 60s.
