= Bear Fire =

2021 wildfire in Arizona, USA

- Part of the 2021 Arizona wildfires
- Date: June 16, 2021 – July 2021
- Location: Clifton, Arizona
- Coordinates: 33.458°N 109.392°W

Statistics
- Burned area: 23,868 acres (9,659 ha)

Impacts
- Structures destroyed: 0

Ignition
- Cause: Lightning

Map
- Location in Eastern Arizona

The Bear Fire was a large lightning-caused wildfire that burned in the Apache-Sitgreaves National Forests in eastern Arizona during the summer of 2021. The fire started on June 16, 2021, near Clifton in Greenlee County and eventually spread to an estimated 23,868 acres (9,659 ha) before it was fully contained (as of June 2021), making it one of several major wildfires to burn across Arizona that summer alongside the Telegraph, Backbone, Mescal, and Rafael fires.

== Timeline ==
=== June ===
The Bear Fire ignited during an active wildfire season in Arizona, in which several large fires, including the Telegraph Fire near Superior, the Mescal Fire near Globe, and the Backbone Fire near Payson, burned simultaneously across the state amid hot and dry conditions. The incident was first reported on June 16, 2021, at around 2:00 pm MDT near Clifton, Arizona.

The Bear Fire burned in remote and steep terrain on the Clifton Ranger District of the Apache-Sitgreaves National Forest, approximately ten miles south of Hannagan Meadow and between Alpine and Clifton, in vegetation described by fire managers as dense brush transitioning into ponderosa pine forest.

=== July ===
Through late June and into July, the fire continued to spread under hot, dry conditions typical of the pre-monsoon fire season in eastern Arizona. Suppression resources assigned to the incident included a Type 3 incident management structure, helicopters and handcrews.

The onset of the North American monsoon in July brought increased humidity and periodic rainfall to eastern Arizona, which is typically credited with helping slow or halt the spread of many of the state's wildfires, including the Bear Fire. By early July 2021, the fire had grown to 23,868 acres, according to data recorded by the National Interagency Fire Center. No fatalities, injuries, or structure losses were reported in connection with the fire.

=== Cause ===
Fire investigators attributed the cause of the Bear Fire to a lightning strike, similar to other ignitions across Arizona's high country in mid-June 2021.

=== Containment ===
The fire was 20% percent contained on July 17, 2021. The National Interagency Fire Center reported that the fire burned through area of 23,868 acres by July 1. The fire was eventually declared fully contained by September.

== Impact ==
=== Closures and Evacuations ===
The fire resulted in the partial closure of U.S. Route 191 due to the Bear Fire. The Arizona Department of Transportation initially closed the highway between milepost 201 and milepost 225 on June 20, 2021, and the closure was later extended from milepost 175 to milepost 250, as fire activity and smoke conditions progressed.

No widespread evacuation orders were enacted, due to the remoteness of the Bear Fire's location. Suppression measures were primarily made to protect isolated cabins and ranch infrastructure.

== See also ==
- 2021 Arizona wildfires
