= List of Arizona wildfires =

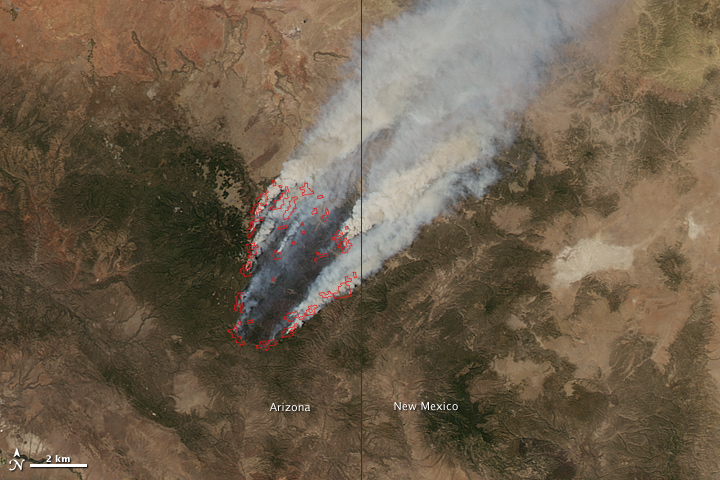
Photograph of the Wallow Fire from space (June 8, 2011)

This is a list of known wildfires in Arizona.

== Background ==
Historically, while peak fire times were from June to July before monsoon season, wildfires now occur at any time of year. Wildfire conditions are influenced by heavy drought and dryness in the state, but snowmelt in the mountains leads to vegetation growth. With decreasing precipitation in spring, fires tend to start earlier. Monsoons affect fire conditions, with above-average monsoons hindering fires and below-average allowing them to spread. Dryness common in Arizona quickly dries out vegetation, allowing dangerous fire conditions.

== Statistics ==
	Wildland		Prescribed	
Year	Fires	Acres	Fires	Acres
2002	3,041	700,101	1,201	95,576
2003	2,876	192,538	450	111,460
2004	2,602	219,900	657	66,199
2005	4,027	975,456	452	111,452
2006	3,274	177,427	1,576	75,325
2007	2,240	101,381	363	98,593
2008	1,850	85,496	413	132,951
2009	2,371	263,358	2,097	147,531
2010	1,517	74,445	203	67,799
2011	1,969	1,036,935	160	55,069
2012	1,684	216,090	243	80,959
2013	1,756	105,281	134	49,491
2014	1,543	205,199	133	64,905
2015	1,662	160,152	224	96,973
2016	2,228	308,245	217	102,025
2017	2,321	429,564	190	133,878

	Human		Lightning		Total	
Year	Fires	Acres	Fires	Acres	Fires	Acres
2018	1,364	86,434	636	78,922	2,000	165,356
2019	1,463	178,815	406	206,127	1,869	384,942
2020	2,073	353,797	451	624,771	2,524	978,568
2021	1,267	337,276	506	187,153	1,773	524,428

== Notable fires ==
Year	Fire name	Description	Cause	Vegetation	County	Area	Structures lost	Deaths	Injuries
1977	Radio Fire	Scorched the peak of Mount Elden in Flagstaff	Human	Ponderosa pine / mixed conifer / grassland	Coconino	4,600 ac 7.2 sq.mi. 1,862 ha	0	0	0
1977	Carr Canyon Fire	Scorched the peak of Carr Peak, Miller Peak in Sierra Vista	Human	Ponderosa pine / mixed conifer / brush / grassland	Cochise	4,000 ac 6.2 sq.mi. 1,200 ha	0	0	0
1990	Dude Fire	Large fire on the Mogollon Rim that burned for 10 days. On June 25, six firefighters were killed in a burn over, including the first female wildland firefighter killed in Arizona. It was Arizona's worst forest fire in history at the time.	Lightning	Ponderosa pine / pine-oak woodland	Coconino	28,000 ac 44 sq.mi. 11,331 ha	63	6	0
1994	Rattlesnake Fire	Scorched the peak of Chiricahua Peak in Douglas	Lightning	Ponderosa pine / mixed conifer / grassland	Cochise	25,000 ac 30+ sq.mi. 3,000 ± ha	0	0	0
1995	Rio Fire	Fast-moving brush fire blackened 36 square miles of desert landscape, including a large part of McDowell Mountain Regional Park and sections of the McDowell Sonoran Preserve.	Lightning	Desert	Maricopa	23,000 ac 36 sq.mi. 9,308 ha	0	0	0
1996	Lone Fire	Largest fire in the history of the Tonto National Forest burned in the Four Peaks Wilderness. The state's largest fire in 25 years.	Human	Desert / brush / mixed oak, pine	Maricopa	61,300 ac 96 sq.mi. 24,800 ha	0	0	0
1996 May	Horseshoe Fire	Fire originated on Horseshoe Hill and spread NE.	Human	Ponderosa pine / grassland	Coconino	8,100 ac 13.7 sq.mi. 3,280 ha	0	0	0
1996 June	Hochderffer Fire	Fire originated at Hochderffer Hills (about 14 miles NNW of Flagstaff) and spread NE.	Lightning	Ponderosa pine / mixed conifer / grassland	Coconino	16,680 ac 25 sq.mi. 6,520 ha	0	0	0
2000 May	Pumpkin Fire	Burned large portion of 10,423' (3177m) elevation Kendrick Peak	Lightning	Ponderosa pine / mixed conifer	Coconino	14,760 ac 23 sq.mi. 5,970 ha	0	0	0
2002	Rodeo–Chediski Fire	The Rodeo fire was intentionally started on June 18 by a seasonal firefighter looking for employment; the Chediski fire was accidentally started on June 20 by a stranded driver trying to attract a news helicopter. Burning areas joined on June 23, having collectively consumed around 300,000 acres. Largest fire in Arizona history at that time.	Human	Ponderosa pine, oak / juniper-pinyon	Coconino / Gila / Navajo	468,638 ac 732 sq.mi. 189,651 ha	426	0	0
2003	Aspen Fire	Fire on Mount Lemmon in the Santa Catalina Mountains burned through the town of Summerhaven, destroying 325 of 340 structures.	Human	Aspen / pine-oak / conifer	Pima / Pinal	84,750 ac 132 sq.mi. 34,297 ha	325+	0	0
2004	Willow Fire	Large fire southwest of Payson in the Mazatzal Wilderness	Lightning	Desert shrub / chaparral	Gila	119,500 ac 187 sq.mi. 48,360 ha	0	0	0
2004	Nuttall/Gibson Complex Fire	Scorched the peak of Mount Graham in Safford	Lightning	Ponderosa pine / mixed conifer / spruce	Graham	30,000+- ac 40+ sq.mi. 5,000+ ha	0	0	0
2005	Cave Creek Complex Fire	Two lightning-caused fires merged to create the third largest wildfire in Arizona history (at that time). Destroyed the historic Cave Creek Mistress Mine, and likely led to the death of the largest-recorded saguaro cactus.	Lightning	Desert grass / chaparral / mixed conifer	Maricopa / Yavapai	243,950 ac 381 sq.mi. 98,723 ha	11+	0	0
2005	Florida Fire	Lightning-caused fire that spread throughout the Santa Rita Mountains within the Coronado National Forest. Destroyed the upper Florida Canyon watershed with its old-growth Douglas fir forest.	Lightning	Oak woodland / mixed conifer	Santa Cruz	23,183 ac 36 sq.mi. 9,382 ha	0	0	0
2006	Brins Mesa Fire	Wildfire (reportedly started by campers) that began on June 18, 2006, about one mile north of Sedona. Burned on Brins Mesa, Wilson Mountain and Oak Creek Canyon.	Human	Ponderosa pine-oak / juniper-pinyon	Yavapai /Coconino	4,317 ac	0	0	0
2010 June	Schultz Fire	Burned large portion of 10,085' (3074m) elevation Schultz Peak and southeastern slopes of San Francisco Mountain. Extensive debris flows and flooding ensued, affecting downslope residential areas beginning July 2010, and resulting in one fatality.	Human	Ponderosa pine / mixed conifer	Coconino	15,075 ac 23.5 sq.mi. 6,100 ha	0	1	0
2011	Horseshoe 2 Fire	Fifth largest fire in Arizona History burned the southeast flank of the Chiricahua Mountains in the Coronado National Forest.	Human	Desert grassland / scrub oak / pine	Cochise	222,954 ac 348 sq.mi. 90,226 ha	23	0	0
2011	Monument Fire	Human-caused fire burned through the Miller Peak Wilderness in the Huachuca Mountains and into Sierra Vista.	Human	Conifer-oak / pinyon-juniper	Cochise	30,526 ac 48 sq.mi. 12,353 ha	84	0	0
2011	Wallow Fire	Largest fire in Arizona history. Burned 841 square miles of vegetation in the Apache National Forest near Alpine.	Human	Ponderosa pine / gamble oak / sagebrush shrubland	Apache / Graham / Greenlee / Navajo	538,049 ac 841 sq.mi. 217,741 ha	72	0	16
2012	Gladiator Fire	Residential fire sparked large fire in the Prescott National Forest near Crown King.	Human	Pine-oak / ponderosa pine	Yavapai	16,240 ac 25 sq.mi. 6,572 ha	6	0	8
2013	Yarnell Hill Fire	June 28 lightning-started fire that grew rapidly due to high temperatures, low humidity and wind. Occurred near the town of Yarnell, about 85 miles NW of Phoenix, killing 19 firefighters and forcing the closure of parts of State Route 89.	Lightning	Desert grass / pinyon-juniper woodlands	Yavapai	8,500 ac 13 sq.mi. 3,440 ha	129	19	22
2014	Slide Fire	Late in the afternoon of May 20, 2014, a wildfire was reported in Oak Creek Canyon, just north of Slide Rock State Park. It was fully contained on June 4, 2014, due to the efforts of over 1,230 firefighters, 50 crews, 29 engines and 9 helicopters. Its cause is still officially classified as "unknown," but officials have said it was likely started by humans.	Unknown	Ponderosa pine-oak / juniper-pinyon	Coconino	21,227 ac	0	0	0
2016	Baker Canyon Fire		Unknown	Brush	Cochise	7,980 ac	0	0	0
2016	Topock Fire		Human	Brush	Mohave	2,200 ac	0	0	0
2017	Sawmill Fire	On April 23, 2017, a father hosting a gender reveal party shot a target containing tannerite (an explosive substance) and blue powder, to announce that the baby was a boy. The explosion started a fire in the surrounding grass. Over 100 people were evacuated and total damage amounted to about $8 million.	Human	Grass / chaparral / oak brush	Pima	46,911 ac		0	0
2017	Goodwin Fire	The fire began on June 24, 2017. It caused the Mayer Fire Department and the Yavapai County Sheriff's Office to shut down parts of Highway 69 between the towns of Mayer and Dewey-Humboldt. More than 100 people had to be evacuated; most were from Mayer.	Unknown	Dry grass / brush / chaparral	Yavapai	28,516 ac	5	0	1
2019	Woodbury Fire	Began on June 8, 2019, five miles northwest of Superior, AZ. Over its duration, the fire traveled through the Superstition Wilderness area of the Tonto National Forest, tracking to the northeast toward Theodore Roosevelt Lake.	Human	Tall grass / brush / chaparral	Pinal, Maricopa, Gila	123,875 ac	0	0	0
2020	Bighorn Fire	The fire started during a thunderstorm over the Tucson area the evening of June 5. A lightning strike hit Coronado National Forest. The fire moved into the Pusch Ridge Wilderness of the Santa Catalina Mountains. By the evening of June 10, it had moved to the south side of the Santa Catalina Mountains, with flames visible throughout Tucson. Evacuations of areas near the fire began on June 11.	Lightning	Bush, trees	Pima	119,541 ac	0	0	9
2020	Bush Fire	The fire started not far from SR-87 which ultimately led to the ongoing closure of this route. The fire is believed to be human-caused, but is still under investigation. Due to high winds and low humidity, the fire rapidly spread and forced evacuations of large sections of the communities of Tonto Basin and Punkin Center.	Human	Grass, chaparral, juniper-pinyon	Maricopa, Gila	193,455 ac	0	0	0
2020	Mangum Fire	The fire started around 3pm EDT on June 8, 2020 in the North Rim of the Grand Canyon. The fire evacuated the community of Jacob Lake. The cause of the fire is currently unknown.	Unknown	Timber, short grass, brush	Coconino	71,450 ac	0	0	0
2021	Spur Fire	The Spur Fire started on May 27, 2021, in the mining town of Bagdad. Due to strong winds, It spread quickly and residents were ordered to evacuate. The fire destroyed 20 structures, including 13 homes. It is believed to have been caused by a road construction crew nearby.	Human	Dry grass / brush	Yavapai	153 ac	20	0	0
2021	Tiger Fire	The Tiger fire started on June 30, 2021, due to a dry lightning strike in the Prescott National Forest. An evacuation order was placed for Horsethief Basin Lake due to the fire burning near the reservoir. On July 30, 2021, the fire reached 100% containment with no injuries or deaths reported, and no buildings damaged or destroyed.	Lightning	Dry grass / brush	Yavapai	16,278 ac	0	0	0
2021	Telegraph Fire	The Telegraph Fire started on June 4, 2021 in Superior. The cause is unknown, but it is believed to be by humans. As of July 3, 2021, the fire was 100% contained.	Human	Dry grass / brush	Pinal	180,747 acres (73,146 ha)	52	0	0
2025	Dragon Bravo Fire	Started on July 4, 2025 near the North Rim of Grand Canyon National Park. Caused by lightning. The fire destroyed 113 structures, including the historic Grand Canyon Lodge. It became a megafire at the close of July 30, 2025. The fire was declared 100% contained on September 29, 2025, at 145,504 acres (58,883 ha).	Lightning	Brush / closed timber litter / timber	Coconino	145,504 acres (58,883 ha)	113	1	None known

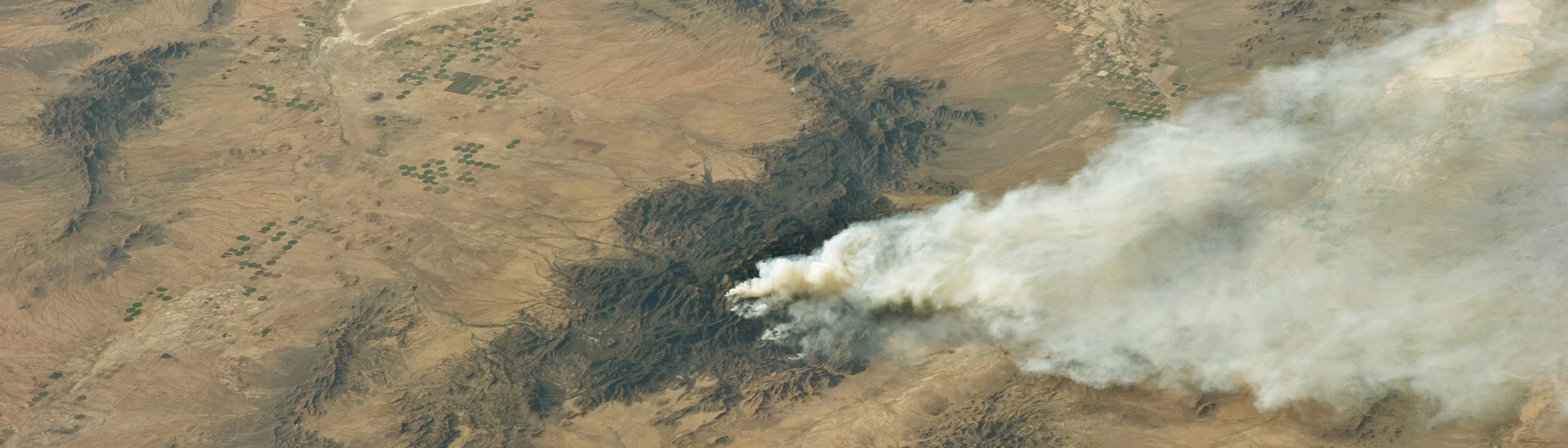
(May 15, 2011) Photograph of the Horseshoe 2 Fire from the International Space Station (original photo)

== Lesser known fires ==
Year	Fire name	Description	Cause	Vegetation	County	Size (acres)	Structures lost	Deaths	Injuries
1990	Big Bug Fire	Small fire started by a logger's burning vehicle	Human	N/A	Yavapai	100	0	0	0
1990	Bray Fire	Small fire on the Mogollon Rim near Bray Creek Ranch	N/A	N/A	Coconino	N/A	N/A	N/A	N/A
1990	Encinosa Fire	Small fire along U.S. Route 89 near Oak Creek Canyon	N/A	Forest	Coconino	N/A	N/A	N/A	N/A
1991	Geronimo Fire	Small fire caused by a Canadian hiker's unattended campfire 25 miles southwest of Flagstaff, Arizona in the Sycamore Canyon Wilderness	Human	High desert / river	Coconino	85+	0	0	0
1991	N/A	Fire about two miles east of Sunset Crater	N/A	Forest	Coconino	450	0	0	0
1992	Troon Fire	Dry conditions helped fuel a brush fire near Troon Country Club. Actual fire name is Granite Mountain.	N/A	Desert	Maricopa	3,000	0	0	0
1994	Warm Springs Fire	N/A	N/A	Desert	Mohave	7,000+	N/A	N/A	N/A
1994	Black Mesa Fire	N/A	N/A	Desert	Yuma	500+	N/A	N/A	N/A
1994	Goodwin Mesa Fire	N/A	N/A	Desert / juniper pinyon	Yavapai	150+	N/A	N/A	N/A
1995	Dynamite Fire	Brush fire along the Verde River north of Rio Verde, Arizona	N/A	Desert / river	Maricopa	900	0	0	0
1995	Geronimo Fire	Brush fire in the Superstition Wilderness southeast of Apache Junction	Human	Desert	Pinal	2,200	0	0	0
1996	Allentown Fire	N/A	Lightning	Juniper pinyon woodland	Apache	4,500	0	0	0
1996	Clark Peak Fire	Fire on Mount Graham burned territory of the endangered Mount Graham Red Squirrel and threatened the Mount Graham International Observatory.	Human	Fir pine	Graham	6,300	0	0	0
1996	Hochderffer Fire	Burned for two weeks and became the largest fire in the history of the Coconino National Forest	Lightning	Ponderosa pine	Coconino	16,400	0	0	0
1996	Witch Well Fire	Fire 25 miles north of St. Johns, Arizona	Lightning	Desert scrub	Apache	680	0	0	0
1999	Harcuvar Fire	Lightning-caused fire near Wenden, Arizona in the Harcuvar Wilderness Area	Lightning	Desert	La Paz	15,980	0	0	0
1999	N/A	Lightning-caused fire in the Arizona Strip country, 40 miles southwest of St. George, Utah	Lightning	Desert / juniper pinyon	Mohave	11,000+	0	0	0
1999	N/A	Lightning-caused fire west of Prescott	Lightning	Grassland / juniper pinyon	Yavapai	1,000	0	0	0
1999	Rainbow Fire	Fire north of Whiteriver, Arizona in the Fort Apache Indian Reservation	Human	Ponderosa pine	Navajo	4,500	17+	0	0
2000	Pumpkin Fire	Lightning caused a fire which burned for 17 days on Kendrick Peak.	Lightning	Ponderosa pine	Coconino	14,760	1	0	0
2005	Barfoot Fire	Small fire near Pine Canyon Camp in the Chiricahua Mountains	Lightning	Madrean conifer-oak / aspen	Cochise	1,600	0	0	0
2005	Edge Complex Fire	Lightning caused a fire south of Mount Ord between Sunflower, Arizona and Punkin Center, Arizona.	Lightning	Chaparral / pine-oak	Gila	71,635	0	0	0
2005	Twin Mills Fire	Lightning sparked fire 3 miles northwest of Golden Valley, Arizona.	Lightning	Grassland / forb / pinyon-juniper	Mohave	12,000	0	0	0
2009	Hyde Fire	Slow-moving fire in the Prescott National Forest	Lightning	Mixed conifer / chaparral	Yavapai	245	0	0	0
2009	Pioneer Fire	Near the Pioneer Pass Campground 8 miles south of Globe, Arizona	Lightning	Pine-oak / ponderosa pine / chaparral	Gila	1,375 acres	0	0	0
2009	Point Fire	Three miles northeast of Pine, Arizona	Lightning	Ponderosa pine	Coconino / Gila	650+	0	0	0
2009	Reno Fire	Lightning-caused fire on Gobbler Point 5 miles southwest of Alpine, Arizona	Lightning	Ponderosa pine	Apache	6,322	0	0	0
2009	Ruby Complex Fire	Two lightning-sparked fires, the Game Reserve Fire and the Ruby Fire, merged in the Kaibab National Forest.	Lightning	Ponderosa / pinyon-juniper	Coconino	4,644+	0	0	0
2009	Water Wheel Fire	Fire started by campers at the Water Wheel Campground threatened the community of Beaver Valley.	Human	Pine-oak forest / chaparral	Gila	800	0	0	0
2010	Big Bug Fire	Small fire believed to be started by a dragging chain burned private property along State Route 69 near Mayer, Arizona.	Human	N/A	Yavapai	65	0	0	0
2010	89 Mesa Fire	May have been started by Arizona Game and Fish employees welding in the area	Human	Ponderosa pine	Coconino	523	0	0	0
2010	Eagle Rock Fire	Lightning-caused fire about 15 miles northeast of Williams, Arizona	Lightning	Ponderosa pine / mixed conifer	Coconino	3,420	0	0	0
2010	Hardy Fire	Transient suspected of starting the fire	Human	Ponderosa pine	Coconino	282	0	0	0
2010	Schultz Fire	Started by an abandoned campfire	Human	Aspen, spruce-fir pine, mixed conifer	Coconino	15,000	0	0	2
2011	Arlene Fire	Fire 3 miles east of Lochiel, Arizona near Parker Canyon Lake	N/A	Desert grassland, scrub oak	Cochise	10,610	0	0	0
2011	Beale Fire	Lightning fire southwest of Kendrick Mountain	Lightning	Ponderosa pine / aspen / mixed conifer	Coconino	5,100+	0	0	0
2011	Diamond Fire	Lightning ignited fire east of Whiteriver, Arizona, north of the Black River near Diamonds Ranch.	Lightning	Ponderosa pine / mixed conifer / pinyon-juniper	Apache	65	0	1	0
2011	Empire Fire	Brush fire 8 miles north of Sonoita, Arizona	Human	Desert grassland	Pima / Santa Cruz	2,009	0	0	1
2011	Empire II Fire	Fast-moving grass fire north of Sonoita, Arizona in the Las Cienegas National Conservation Area	Human	Desert grassland	Pima / Santa Cruz	600	0	0	0
2011	Greaterville Fire	Fire started by a welder in the Coronodo Nation Forest, 10 miles southeast of Green Valley, Arizona	Human	Madrean Encinal / mixed conifer / pine-oak	Pima	1,800	0	0	0
2011	Murphy Complex Fire	Three-lightning sparked fires, the Bull Fire, Pena Fire, and Murphy Fire, merged in the Tumacacori Mountains, 3 miles east of Arivaca, Arizona.	Lightning	Madrean Encinal	Santa Cruz	68,078	0	0	2
2011	Point Fire	Lightning-ignited fire on the north rim of the Grand Canyon	Lightning	Ponderosa / mixed conifer	Coconino	4,195	0	0	0
2011	Tanner Fire	Lightning-caused fire started on Armer Mountain in the Sierra Ancha Mountains south of Young, Arizona.	Lightning	Ponderosa pine / pine-oak	Gila	5,500	0	0	0
2012	Apache Pass Fire	Small fire north of Fort Bowie	Human	Desert grassland	Cochise	1,686	0	0	0
2012	257 Fire	Small fire 4 miles southeast of Superior, Arizona	N/A	Desert scrub	Pinal	2,860	0	0	0
2012	Bull Flat Fire	Area recovering from the 2002 Rodeo-Chediski fire	Lightning	Grass, brush, deadwood	Gila	2,147	0	0	0
2012	Cooks Complex Fire	Three separate lightning-ignited fires merged into one, 5 miles east of Black Canyon City, Arizona.	Lightning	Desert scrub	Yavapai	7,299	0	0	0
2012	Fox Fire	Six miles south of Superior, Arizona	Lightning	Desert scrub	Pinal	7,500	0	0	0
2012	Grapevine Fire	Twenty miles southwest of Safford, Arizona	Lightning	Desert grass, shrubs	Graham	19,100	0	0	0
2012	Hobble Complex Fire	Four lightning-sparked fires merged 35 miles south of St. George, Utah.	Lightning	Desert grass / juniper pinyon	Mohave	35,000	0	0	0
2012	Montezuma Fire	Fire on the Tohono O'odham Indian Resorvation in the Baboquivari Peak Wilderness	N/A	Madrean pinyon-juniper	Pima	1,700	1	2	0
2012	Plateau Fire	N/A	Lightning	Desert grass / juniper pinyon	Mohave	3,175	0	0	0
2012	Poco Fire	Six miles northeast of Young, Arizona, within miles of the recent Bull Flat Fire	Human	Ponderosa pine	Gila	11,950	0	0	2
2012	School Canyon Fire	Fire in the San Rafael Valley that began in Mexico and spread across the border into Arizona	Human	Grassland, desert scrub, Madrean Encinal	Cochise, Santa Cruz	7,049	0	0	0
2012	Sunflower Fire	Started by an incendiary shotgun round along Sycamore Creek, near Sunflower, 30 miles north of Mesa	Human	Chaparral, grass, pinyon, cypress	Maricopa	17,446	0	0	0
2012	West Side Complex Fire	Eight lightning-started fires on the west side of the Kaibab Plateau in the Coconino National Forest north of the Kanab Creek Wilderness	Lightning	Desert grass, pinyon-juniper woodlands	Mohave	2,871	0	0	0
2013	Doce Fire	Fire of unknown origins burned a square mile of chaparral in the Granite Mountain Wilderness northwest of Prescott, Arizona.	N/A	Juniper pinyon woodland	Yavapai	850	0	0	0
2015	Finger Rock Fire	Rain caused a small fire in the Catalina Mountains to smoulder between 29 July 2015 and 5 August 2015. It reignited on 5 August as rain soaked vegetation dried. The fire was visible across much of metropolitan Tucson. The fire caused interest in Tucson, in addition to some viral internet interest, as the view was particularly dramatic at night.	Lightning	Chaparral, grass	Pima/Pinal	750+	N/A (fire self-contained in a rocky canyon and not actively fought)	N/A	N/A
2016	Tenderfoot Fire, Yarnell, Arizona								
2019	Tilbury Fire	On June 14, 2019, a fire was reported near Kearny, AZ. Quick action by the Kearny Volunteer Fire Department prevented damage to nearby structures.			Pinal	22			
2019	Mountain Fire	This human-caused fire was reported on June 7, 2019, 8 miles east of the Cave Creek Ranger District Office. It was located in the Tonto National Forest. As of June 18, 2019, it was 100% contained.	Human			7,470			
2019	Cellar Fire	This fire burned in the Prescott National Forest.	Lightning	Grass, brush	Yavapai	7,512			
2019	Ikes Fire					16,416			
2024	Wildcat Fire	Fire in the Tonto National Forest	Human	Grass-brush	Maricopa County	14,402	0	0	0+
2026	Hazen Fire	Near Buckeye. Burning occurred in the dry riverbed of the Gila River. No deaths or injuries were reported, and no damage to structures.	unknown	Brush, salt cedar	Maricopa County	1,191	0	0	0
