= Tropical Storm Harold =

Atlantic tropical storm in 2023

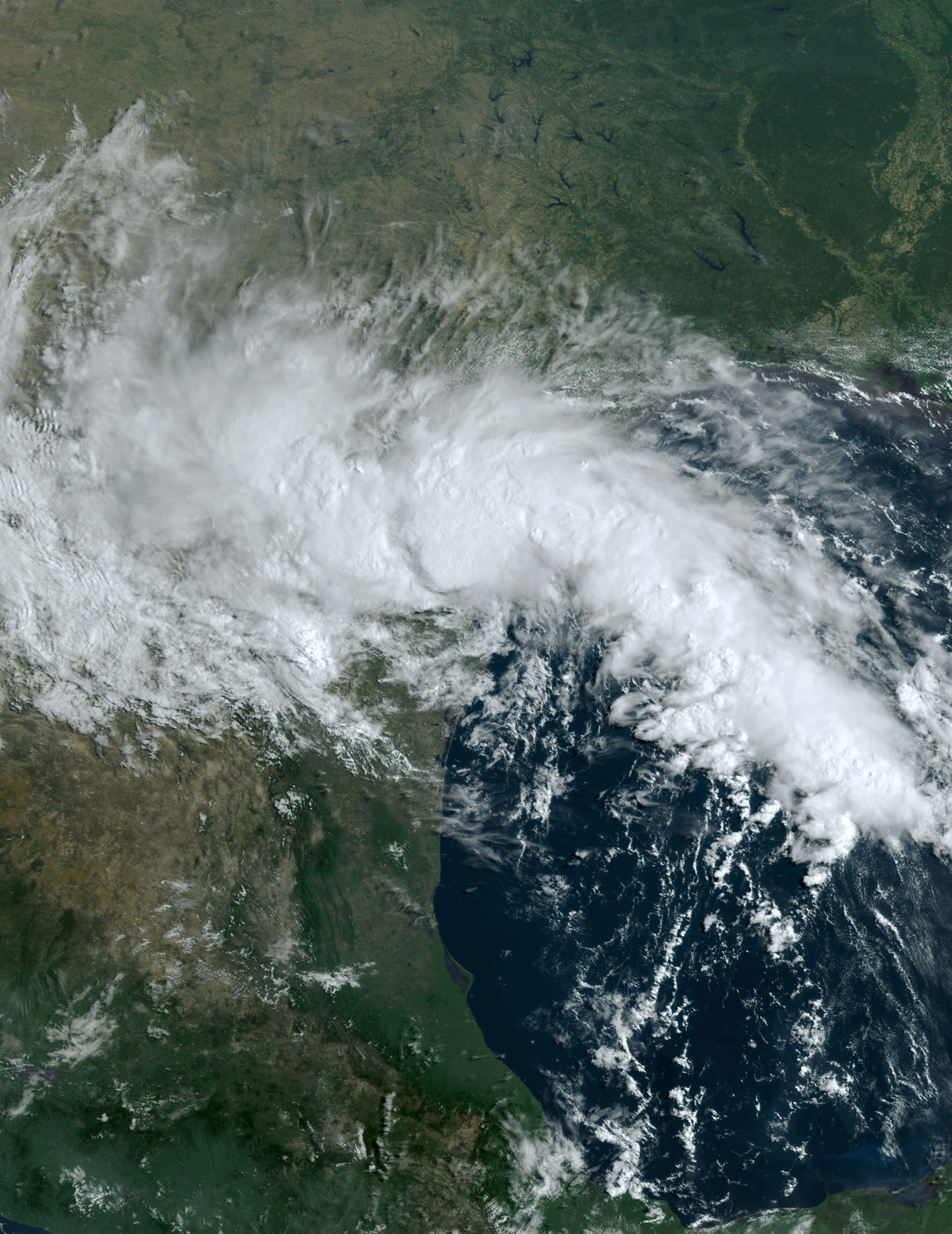
- Tropical Storm Harold at peak intensity while making landfall on August 22

Meteorological history
- Formed: August 21, 2023
- Dissipated: August 23, 2023

Tropical storm
- 1-minute sustained (SSHWS/NWS)
- Highest winds: 60 mph (95 km/h)
- Lowest pressure: 995 mbar (hPa); 29.38 inHg

Overall effects
- Fatalities: 1 direct
- Missing: 1
- Damage: $505,000 (2023 USD)
- Areas affected: Southwestern United States, Northern Mexico
- IBTrACS /
- Part of the 2023 Atlantic hurricane season

Tropical Storm Harold was a moderate tropical storm that made landfall in South Texas in August 2023. The eighth named storm (Note: This figure excludes an unnamed subtropical storm in January 2023) of the 2023 Atlantic hurricane season, Harold developed from a tropical wave that entered the Gulf of Mexico on August 20, after passing through the Bahamas and South Florida. The system steadily organized over the following days, over record-warm sea-surface temperatures in the Gulf, as it progressed westward. Although the disturbance had not become organized enough to become a tropical cyclone yet, due to the threat it posed to southern Texas, the United States–based National Hurricane Center (NHC) initiated advisories on the system as Potential Tropical Cyclone Nine on August 21. The disturbance organized into a tropical depression six hours later, before strengthening into a tropical storm the following morning and receiving the name Harold. Harold continued to strengthen as it moved quickly westward, and the cyclone made landfall on Padre Island, Texas, around 15:00 UTC (Note: All times are in Coordinated Universal Time (UTC) unless otherwise noted) on August 22, as a 60 mph (95 km/h) tropical storm. Harold quickly weakened as it moved inland over southern Texas and dissipated on August 23, though its remnant mid-level circulation and associated moisture affected the central United States for several more days.

Harold led to severe wind gusts and significant rainfall as it struck Texas. Corpus Christi reported 5.25 in (133 mm) of rain from Harold, including a daily record of 4.74 in (120 mm) on August 22; similarly significant rainfall was reported in northern Mexico, peaking at 4 in (100 mm) in Piedras Negras in the state of Coahuila. A modest storm surge of up to 2.2 ft (0.67 m) was reported at San Luis Pass. Wind gusts of up to 67 mph (108 km/h) affected the area, and over 35,000 electricity customers lost power during the storm. One school district in Texas had to shut down for several days following the storm due to the damage Harold inflicted on its classrooms. The remnants of Harold affected the southwestern United States for several days, producing flash flooding that killed one person and left another missing in Nevada. Overall damage from Harold was minor in most areas, however, totaling to around $505,000 (2023 USD).

== Meteorological history ==
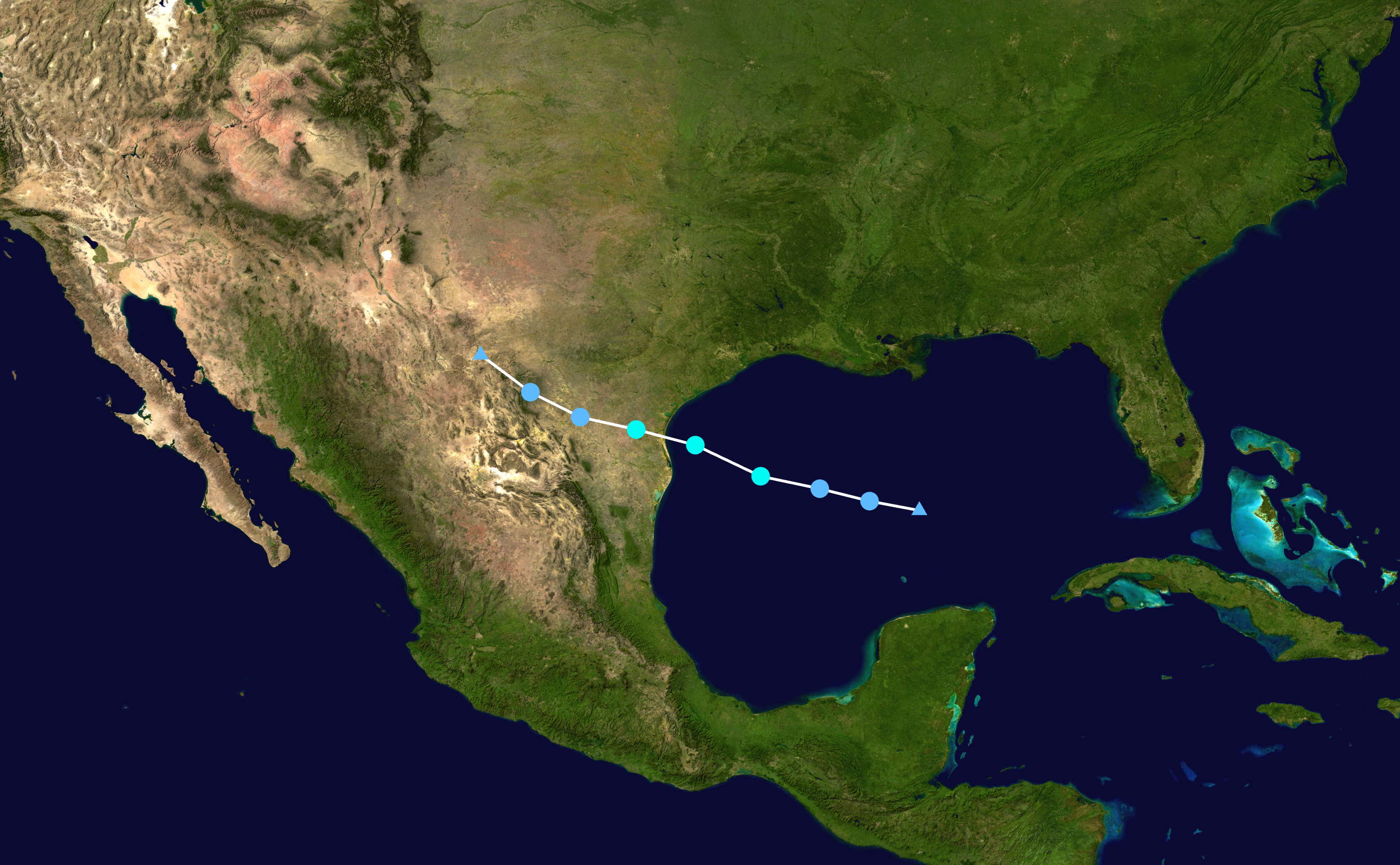
Map plotting the storm's track and intensity, according to the Saffir–Simpson scale Map key Saffir–Simpson scale Tropical depression (≤38 mph, ≤62 km/h) Tropical storm (39–73 mph, 63–118 km/h) Category 1 (74–95 mph, 119–153 km/h) Category 2 (96–110 mph, 154–177 km/h) Category 3 (111–129 mph, 178–208 km/h) Category 4 (130–156 mph, 209–251 km/h) Category 5 (≥157 mph, ≥252 km/h) Unknown Storm type Tropical cyclone Subtropical cyclone Extratropical cyclone, remnant low, tropical disturbance, or monsoon depression

Harold developed from a tropical wave that left the west coast of Africa sometime between August 8–10. The wave crossed the tropical Atlantic Ocean over the next week. Convection increased over the northern part of the wave on August 17, to the north of the Dominican Republic. The disturbance progressed westward, passing through The Bahamas and southern Florida over the following days, entering the Gulf of Mexico the morning of August 20. The developing system became better organized as it crossed the Gulf, but lacked sufficient organization to be deemed a tropical cyclone by late on August 21. Despite this, due to the National Hurricane Center's (NHC) expectation that the system would strengthen into a tropical storm and strike the Texas coast the next day, advisories were initiated on the system as Potential Tropical Cyclone Nine at 15:00 UTC on August 21. About three hours after being designated a potential tropical cyclone, the system acquired a closed, well-defined circulation; it thus met the criteria of a tropical cyclone and became the ninth tropical depression of the 2023 Atlantic hurricane season at 18:00 UTC that day.

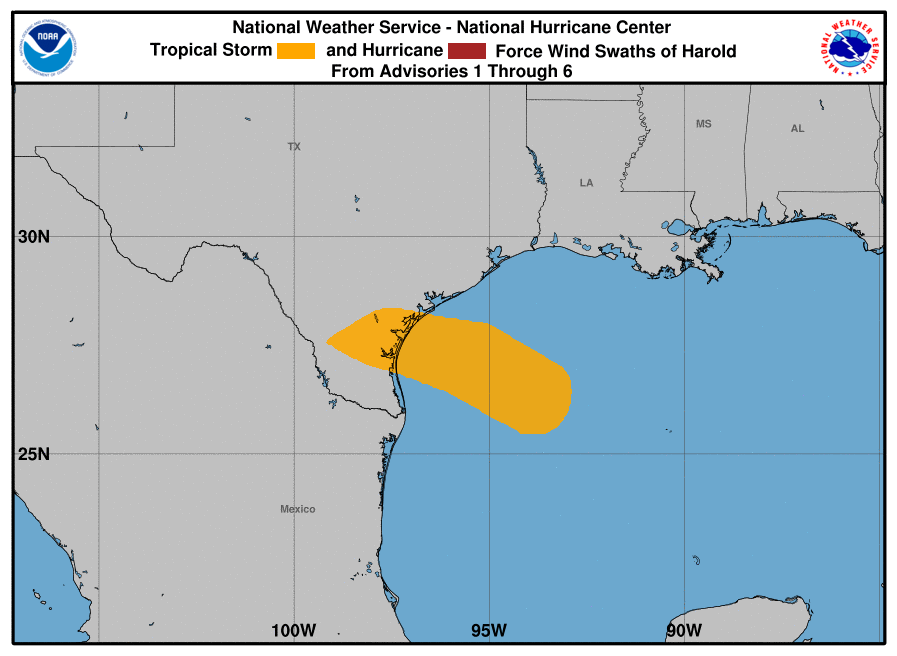
Wind history of Tropical Storm Harold, with orange shaded areas representing areas of tropical-storm force (39 mph (63 km/h) or greater) winds.

The newly formed cyclone continued to become better organized as it moved more quickly westward toward the Texas coast, steered by a mid-level ridge to its north. The depression was upgraded to Tropical Storm Harold at 6:00 UTC on August 22, as the broad cyclone's rain bands began to move onshore. Shortly before landfall, Harold's center reformed to the north of its previous position, and the storm strengthened further to achieve its peak intensity, with maximum sustained winds of 50 mph (80 km/h) and a minimum barometric pressure of 996 millibars. Harold made landfall on Padre Island, Texas by 15:00 UTC at peak intensity. Harold weakened quickly as it moved inland, dropping back to tropical depression status about six hours later, at which time the Weather Prediction Center (WPC) took over responsibility for issuing advisories on the storm from the NHC. Late that day, Tropical Depression Harold crossed into northern Mexico and continued to steadily weaken. The WPC issued its final advisory on Harold at 15:00 UTC on August 23 as its surface low became increasingly ill-defined and dissipated far inland over Mexico. The depression finally degenerated to a remnant low over the Big Bend region of Texas that day, dissipating shortly thereafter.

== Preparations and impact ==
=== United States ===
==== Texas ====
On August 21, upon Harold's precursor's designation as a potential tropical cyclone, a tropical storm warning was issued for much of the coast of southern Texas, from the mouth of the Rio Grande river, at the Texas-Mexico border, up to Port O'Connor, placing 1.3 million residents under the tropical storm warning, with rainfall anticipated to reach up to 7 in (180 mm). A Tropical Storm Watch was issued from north of Port O’Connor to Sargent. The Texas Division of Emergency Management, the state government's emergency management division, was deployed ahead of Harold's expected landfall, and the Texas State Emergency Operations Center was activated to Level II that day, indicating "escalated response conditions". Several school districts in multiple communities across the southern Texas coast were closed in advance of the storm for several days. Residents across southern Texas were advised to prepare for the potential for flash flooding and tornadoes.

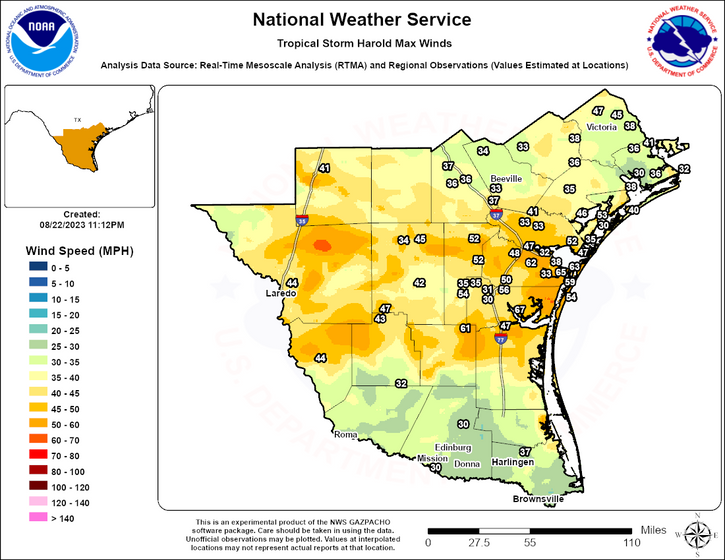
Chart of wind speeds associated with Harold across South Texas.

Harold struck South Texas with strong winds and heavy rain as it moved across the region. A modest storm surge of 1.6–2.2 feet (0.67 m) was reported in areas including Port Lavaca, Galveston Bay, and San Luis Pass. Sustained winds of 36 mph (58 km/h), with stronger gusts of 59 mph (95 km/h), were reported at Corpus Christi International Airport, as well as 3.06 in (78 mm) of rainfall. A peak wind gust of 67 mph (107 km/h) was measured at Loyola Beach, while rainfall peaked at 6.98 in (177 mm) in Orange Grove. Harold's rains were somewhat beneficial in certain areas of Southern Texas, which was in the midst of a moderate to severe drought before Harold's landfall. Harold dropped a total of 4.74 in (120 mm) of rain in a 24-hour period in Corpus Christi, setting a new daily rainfall record for the city, surpassing the previous record set by the much more powerful Hurricane Bret in 1999. Further, Corpus Christi was originally on track for one of its driest summers on record before Harold's landfall, but following the storm the city's summer rainfall rose above the seasonal average. Total rainfall from Harold reached 5.42 in (138 mm) in Corpus Christi and 5.15 in (131 mm) in Portland. Wind gusts of 65 mph (105 km/h) affected Corpus Christi as well. Two EF0 tornadoes were recorded in the counties of Live Oak and Jim Wells, however they caused minimal damage.

Over 35,000 homes and business lost power due to Harold. The London Independent School District was shut down for several days due to damage sustained during the storm. Floods in Robstown inundated roads; firefighters in Robstown monitored flood-prone streets. Gusty winds caused minor damage across Corpus Christi, mostly limited to downed trees, fences, and light poles. Heavy rain caved in ceiling tiles inside a building owned by the American Legion in Corpus Christi, which had already been damaged by Hurricane Harvey in 2017. Storm surge raised water levels up to 2.6 ft (0.8 m) in Corpus Christi Bay. Storm surge flooding inundated the parking lot of the Art Museum of South Texas, as well as closing multiple roads and turnaround of U.S. Route 181 in the North Beach neighborhood. Storm surge also scattered debris and caused beach erosion on Padre Island. In Kleberg County, tropical storm-force winds downed trees and brought beneficial rainfall to parts of the area. Street flooding also occurred in Kingsville. First responders performed a water rescue near Alfred, after a vehicle attempted to traverse a flooded low-level crossing. Several roads were closed due to flooding in Laredo, including an intersection of Interstate 35. Across Laredo, 15 high water rescues were performed. Overall, damage across Texas totaled $381,000.

==== Elsewhere ====
As Harold progressed inland, flash flood watches were issued in parts of Arizona, New Mexico, and Utah. The remnants of Tropical Storm Harold brought rainfall to Colorado, with 0.73 in (19 mm) of rain falling in Denver. The highest rainfall total in the state was 2.49 in (63 mm) in Nathrop. The storm brought the first Atlantic tropical rain in the state in 15 years. The heavy rainfall in Colorado resulted in flash floods and mudflows. The collection of water on the burn scar of the Grizzly Creek Fire resulted in a mudslide that closed a portion of Interstate 70 near Glenwood Springs. Minor flooding occurred in Cortez, which entered a few basements. Flooding also submerged roads and entered basements in De Beque, Marble, and Rifle. Damage across Colorado reached $24,000. Heavy rainfall occurred in New Mexico, reaching a peak amount of 3.3 in (84.6 mm) in La Luz. Multiple locations across the Sacramento Mountains recorded rainfall totals in excess of 2 in (51 mm), as well. A rockslide blocked part of U.S. Route 82 near Mountain Park.

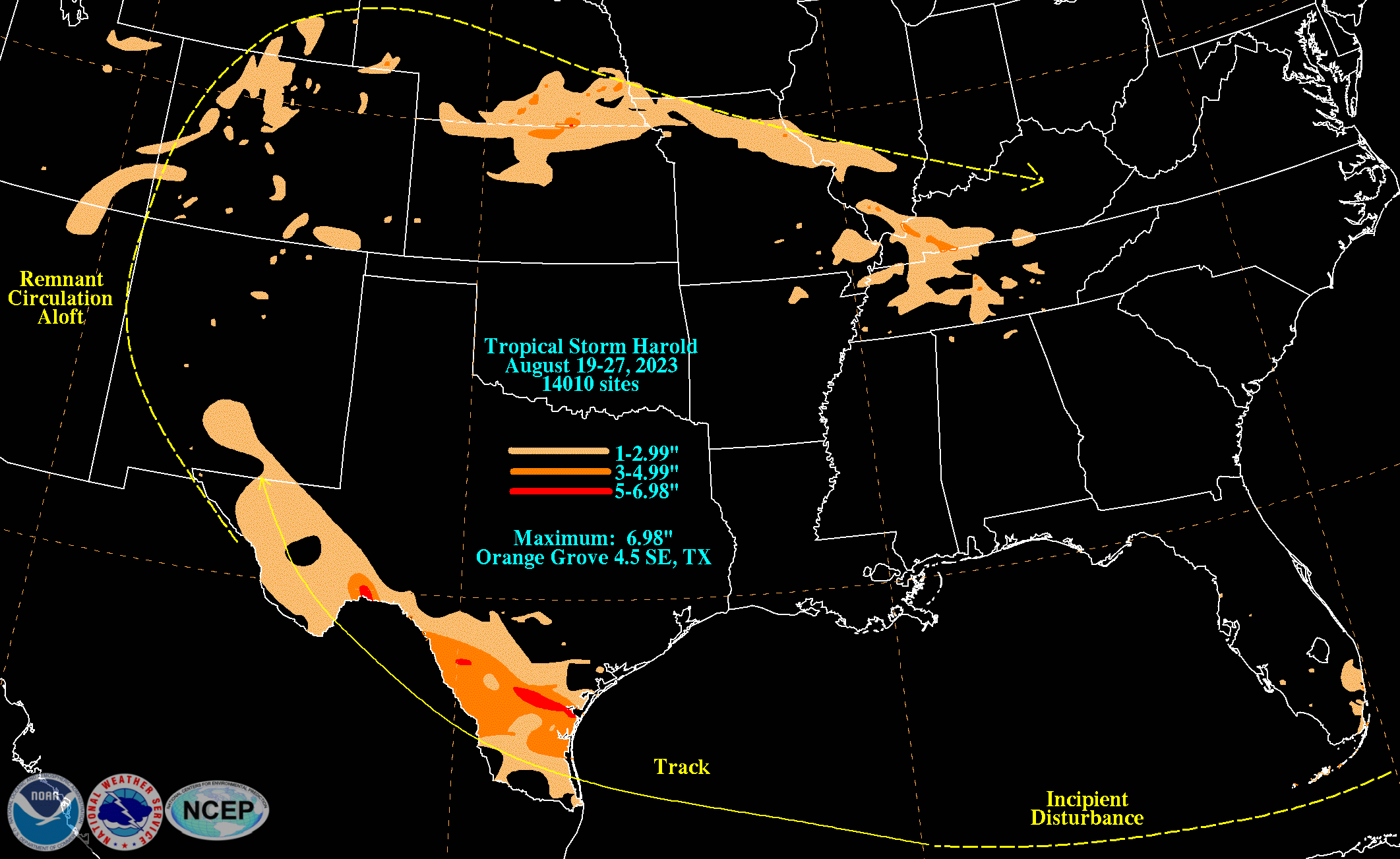
Rainfall produced by Harold and its remnants across the United States from August 19–27.

Moisture from Harold, combined with the remnants of Eastern Pacific Hurricane Hilary, also led to rainfall across parts of Arizona and Nevada. The Paria River rose up to 6.6 ft (2 m) above normal late on August 24 in Marble Canyon. The scar from the Schultz Fire and Pipeline Fire resulted in a debris flow that blocked a road near Sunset Crater. Thunderstorms over the Las Vegas Valley resulted in numerous severe thunderstorm and flash flood warnings being issued. Only around half an inch (13 mm) of precipitation was observed in most of Las Vegas, although a pump station along Desert Inn Road near the Las Vegas Strip recorded a maximum precipitation amount of 1.34 in (34 mm) within an hour. Despite the overall low amount of rainfall the desert environment of the region led to these rainfall totals having a more significant effect. Flash flooding inundated parts of the Las Vegas Strip. One person drowned in a wash amidst the intense flooding, while another was reported missing. The Harrah's Las Vegas casino suffered damage to ceiling tiles and water leaks. Losses in Nevada reached $100,000. Heavy rainfall was observed in Utah, with rainfall rates in excess of 0.4 in (10 mm) at Mary Jane Canyon in Grand County in 30 minutes. The resultant downstream flooding swept away a woman and her dog, however, both were rescued without injuries. Further east in Nebraska, the remnants of Harold produced heavy rainfall in Cheyenne County, which flooded roads in Sidney, stranding a vehicle in high water.

=== Mexico ===
Moderate rainfall and gusty winds affected portions of the Mexican states of Tamaulipas, Chihuahua, Nuevo León and Coahuila, although the strongest winds and heaviest flooding remained north of the states. The heaviest rainfall from Harold in Mexico occurred in the city of Piedras Negras in Coahuila, with over 4 in (100 mm) falling within a few hours. Street flooding was reported in Nuevo Laredo.

== See also ==
- Weather of 2023
- Tropical cyclones in 2023
- List of Texas hurricanes (1980–present)
- Hurricane Bret (1999) – took a similar path and affected similar areas in 1999
- Hurricane Dolly (2008) – made landfall in almost the exact same location 15 years prior
- Tropical Storm Fernand (2019) – took a similar path and had a similar intensity
- Hurricane Hanna (2020) – took a similar path and affected similar areas in 2020
- Tropical Storm Alberto (2024) – affected similar areas in 2024
