= Tunnel Fire (2022) =

2022 wildfire in Arizona, USA

- Part of the 2022 Arizona wildfires
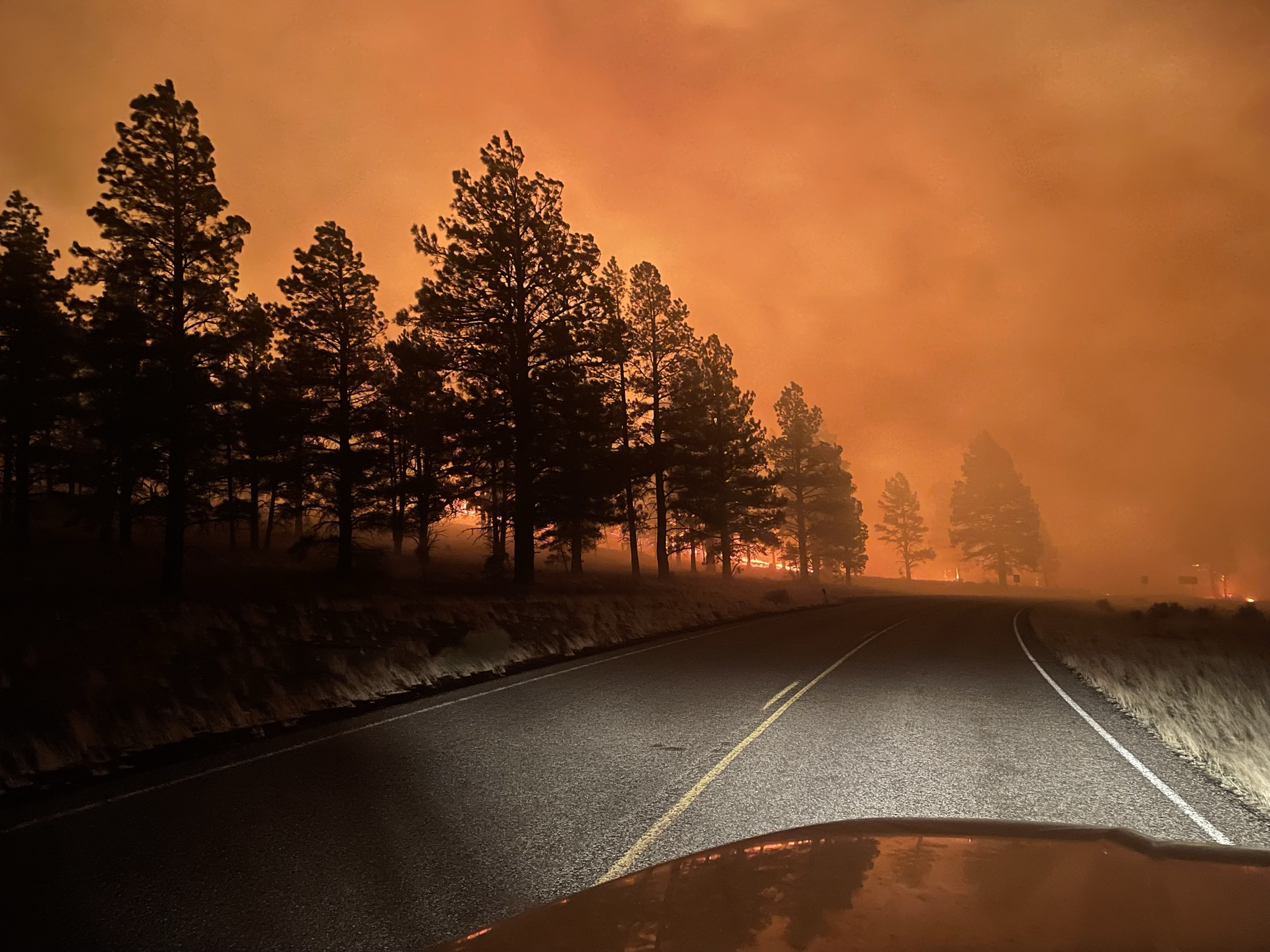
- Date: April 17, 2022 – June 1, 2022
- Location: Flagstaff, Arizona
- Coordinates: 35.304°N 111.589°W

Statistics
- Burned area: 26,532 acres (10,737 ha)
- Land use: Grass, Brush, and Pine

Impacts
- Deaths: 0
- Structures destroyed: 30 homes

Ignition
- Cause: Under investigation

Map
- Location within Arizona Location within the United States

The Tunnel Fire was a wildfire that burned in Coconino National Forest and Sunset Crater Volcano National Monument, the Black Bill Park neighborhood north of the city of Flagstaff, Arizona in the United States, and along U.S. Route 89. The fire was named after a tunnel landmark on Waterline Road, near where it ignited on Sunday, April 17, 2022. On June 3, 2022, the wildfire was declared 100% contained by the Arizona Emergency Information Network (AZEIN). It had burned 26,532 acres (10,737 ha) and had destroyed 30 homes. No fatalities or injuries were reported.

== Cause ==
While the cause of the fire is unknown, officials have deemed it unlikely the fire was lightning-caused. The fire was first reported on the afternoon of April 17, 2022 near the outskirts of Flagstaff.

== Development ==
=== April ===
The fire was first reported on April 17, 2022, at approximately 4:22 p.m. MST. The cause of the fire is currently unknown. AZIEN said that, while an investigation found a "specific origin area and excluded many cause determinations", the exact cause was still unknown.

On April 22, scattered rain and even snow showers were falling on the fire. This helped to douse dry vegetation, but strong winds dried the vegetation out soon after. There were still two spot fires inside the perimeter. Large fallen trees from the Schultz Fire kept one pocket burning at 500 acres (200 ha). Another isolated pocket burned near Strawberry Crater Wilderness Area, but it moved into flatter terrain with less fuels.

== Containment ==
The fire reached 100% containment on June 1.

== Impact ==
=== Structure ===
The fire destroyed 30 residential structures and 24 outbuildings. An estimated 109 properties were impacted.

=== Closures and evacuations ===
U.S. Route 89 was closed between mileposts 423 and 445 because of the wildfire.

Coconino National Forest issued a forest closure for areas affected by the Tunnel Fire. The fire burned Sunset Crater Volcano National Monument, and culturally important items were relocated.

An estimated 2,068 people lived in the evacuation area near Flagstaff.
