= Telegraph Fire =

2021 wildfire in Superior, Arizona, USA

- Part of the 2021 Arizona wildfires
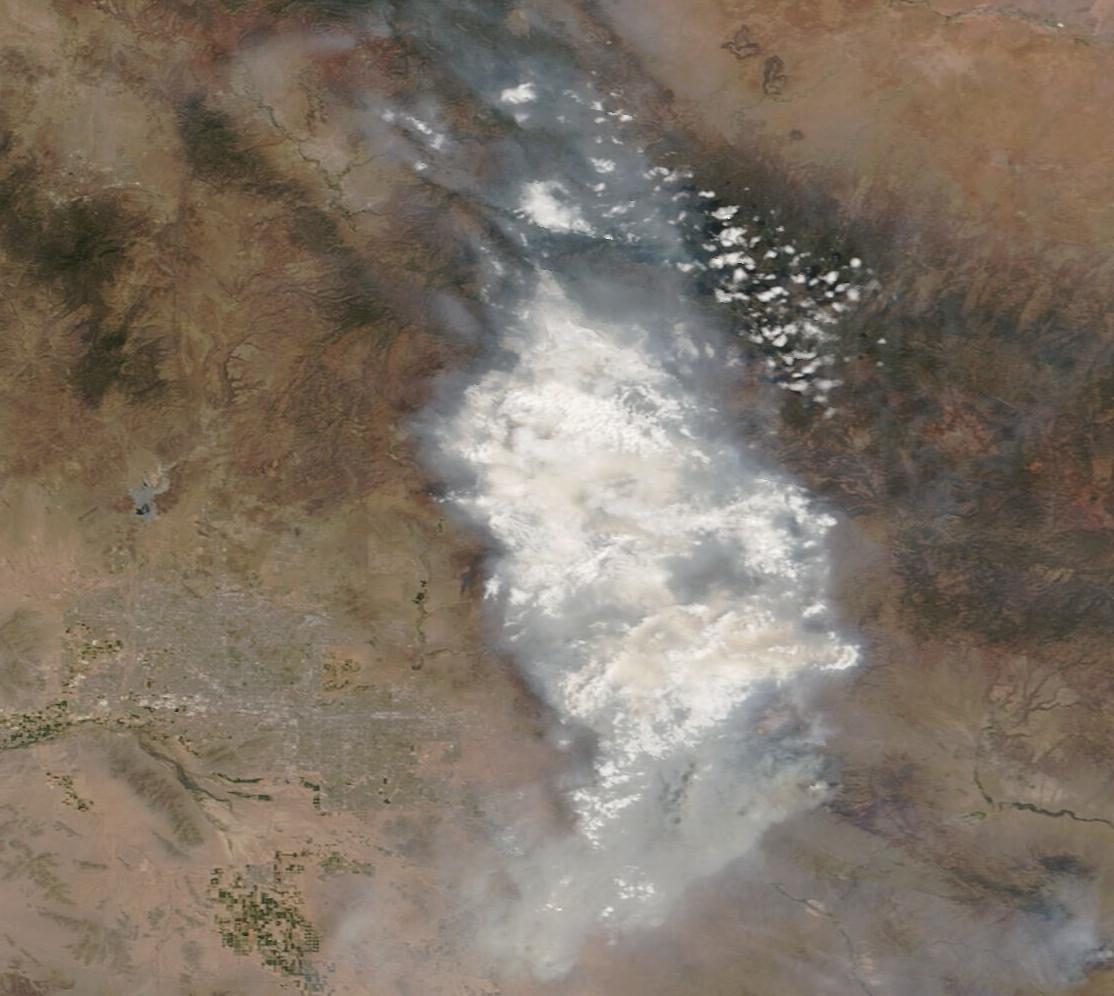
- Smoke from the Telegraph Fire as seen from space on June 14
- Date: June 4, 2021 – July 3, 2021
- Location: Superior, Arizona
- Coordinates: 33.209°N 111.092°W

Statistics
- Burned area: 180,757 acres (73,150 ha)

Impacts
- Structures lost: 52

Ignition
- Cause: Human-caused (under investigation)

Map
- Location in Southern Arizona

The Telegraph Fire was a wildfire that started near Superior, Arizona on June 4, 2021. The fire burned 180,757 acres (73,150 ha) and was fully contained on July 3, 2021. It was the largest wildfire in the United States of the 2021 wildfire season until being surpassed by the Bootleg Fire in Oregon on July 13, 2021.

== Progression ==
=== June ===
The Telegraph Fire was first reported at around 1:30 pm MST on June 4, 2021.

=== Cause ===
The fire is believed to be human-caused, but it is still under further investigation.

=== Containment ===
On July 3, 2021, the Telegraph Fire reached 100% containment.

== Effects ==
=== Closures and evacuations ===
The Telegraph Fire led to a number of closures and evacuations.

On June 6, 2021, residents in Top-of-the-World and the Oaks Mobile Home and RV Park were ordered to evacuate. Later that same day, all Miami residents west of the Miami town limits were ordered to evacuate. On June 14, 2021, residents of El Capitan, Arizona were ordered to evacuate.

State Route 77 is closed in both directions between the State Route 177 junction in Winkelman and US 70. State Route 177 is closed between US 60 in Superior and State Route 77 in Winkelman.

=== Damage ===
As of June 19, 2021, 51 structures have been destroyed by the fire, including 22 buildings in El Capitan.

== See also ==
- 2021 Arizona wildfires
- List of Arizona wildfires
  - Mescal Fire, another large wildfire burning near the Telegraph Fire
