= Pinnacle Fire =

2021 wildfire in Arizona, USA

- Part of the 2021 Arizona wildfires
- Date: June 10, 2021 – July 16, 2021
- Location: Safford, Arizona
- Coordinates: 32.865°N 110.201°W

Statistics
- Burned area: 34,417 acres (13,928 ha)

Ignition
- Cause: Under investigation

Map
- Location in Northern Arizona

The Pinnacle Fire was a wildfire that started near Safford, Arizona on June 10, 2021. The fire burned 34,417 acres (13,928 ha) and was fully contained on July 16, 2021.

== Events ==
=== June ===
The Pinnacle Fire was first reported on June 10, 2021, at around 12:00 pm MST.

=== Cause ===
The cause of the fire is currently unknown and is under investigation.

=== Containment ===
On July 16, 2021, the Pinnacle Fire reached 100% containment.
