= Tussock Fire =

2021 wildfire in Arizona, USA

- Part of the 2021 Arizona wildfires
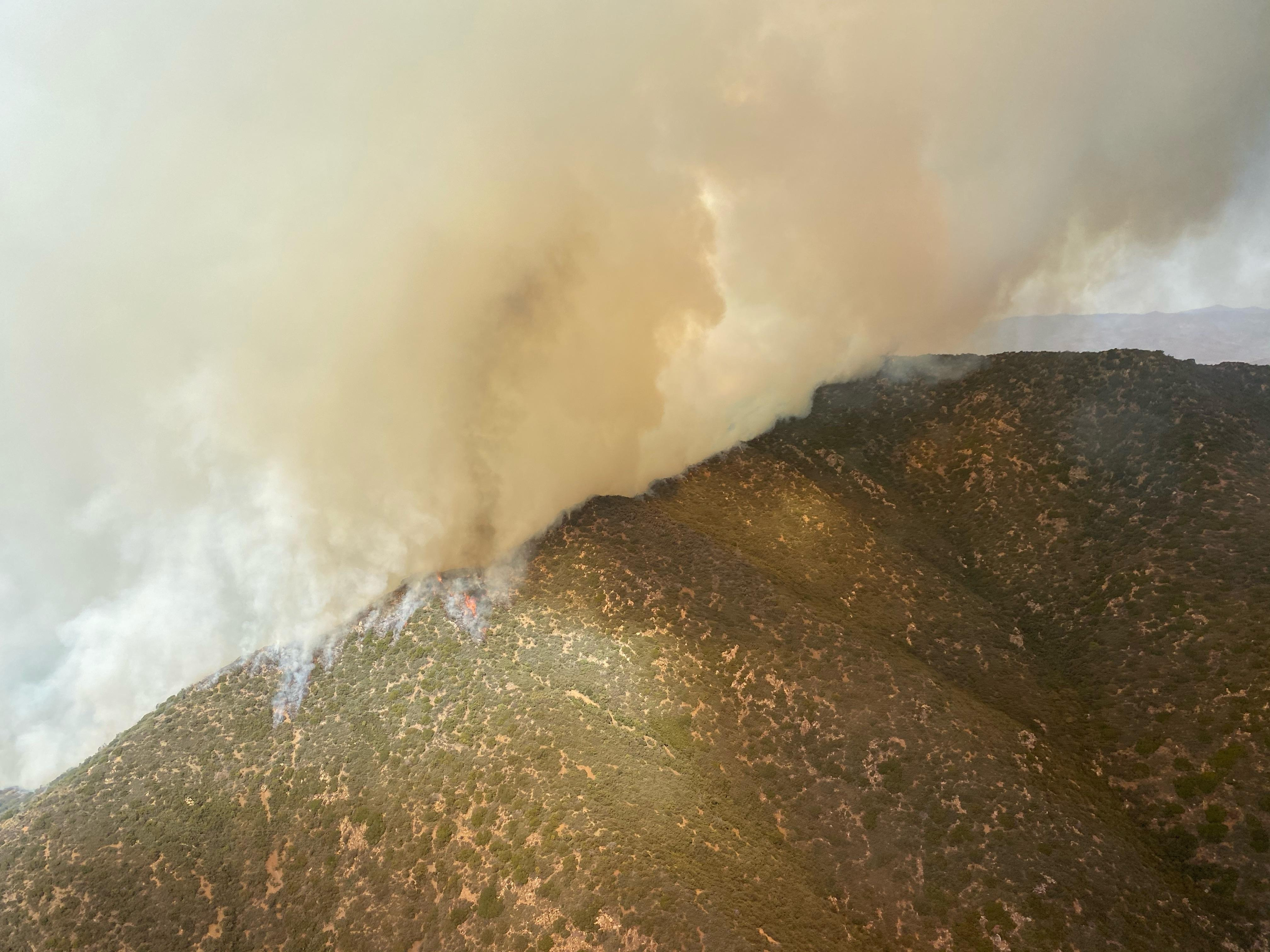
- Aerial photo of smoke rising from the Tussock Fire
- Date: May 8, 2021 – May 24, 2021
- Location: Wickenburg, Arizona
- Coordinates: 34.096°N 112.423°W

Statistics
- Burned area: 5,546 acres (2,244 ha)

Ignition
- Cause: Under investigation

Map
- Location within Arizona

The Tussock Fire was a wildfire that started near the town of Wickenburg, Arizona on May 8, 2021. The fire burned 5,546 acres (2,244 ha) and is 100% contained.

== Development ==
=== May ===
The Tussock Fire was first reported on May 8, 2021, at around 2pm MST. The fire is believed to be human-caused, but the specific cause is still under investigation.

=== Containment ===
By May 24, 2021, the Tussock Fire reached 100% containment.
