= Copper Canyon Fire =

2021 wildfire near Globe, Arizona, USA

- Part of the 2021 Arizona wildfires
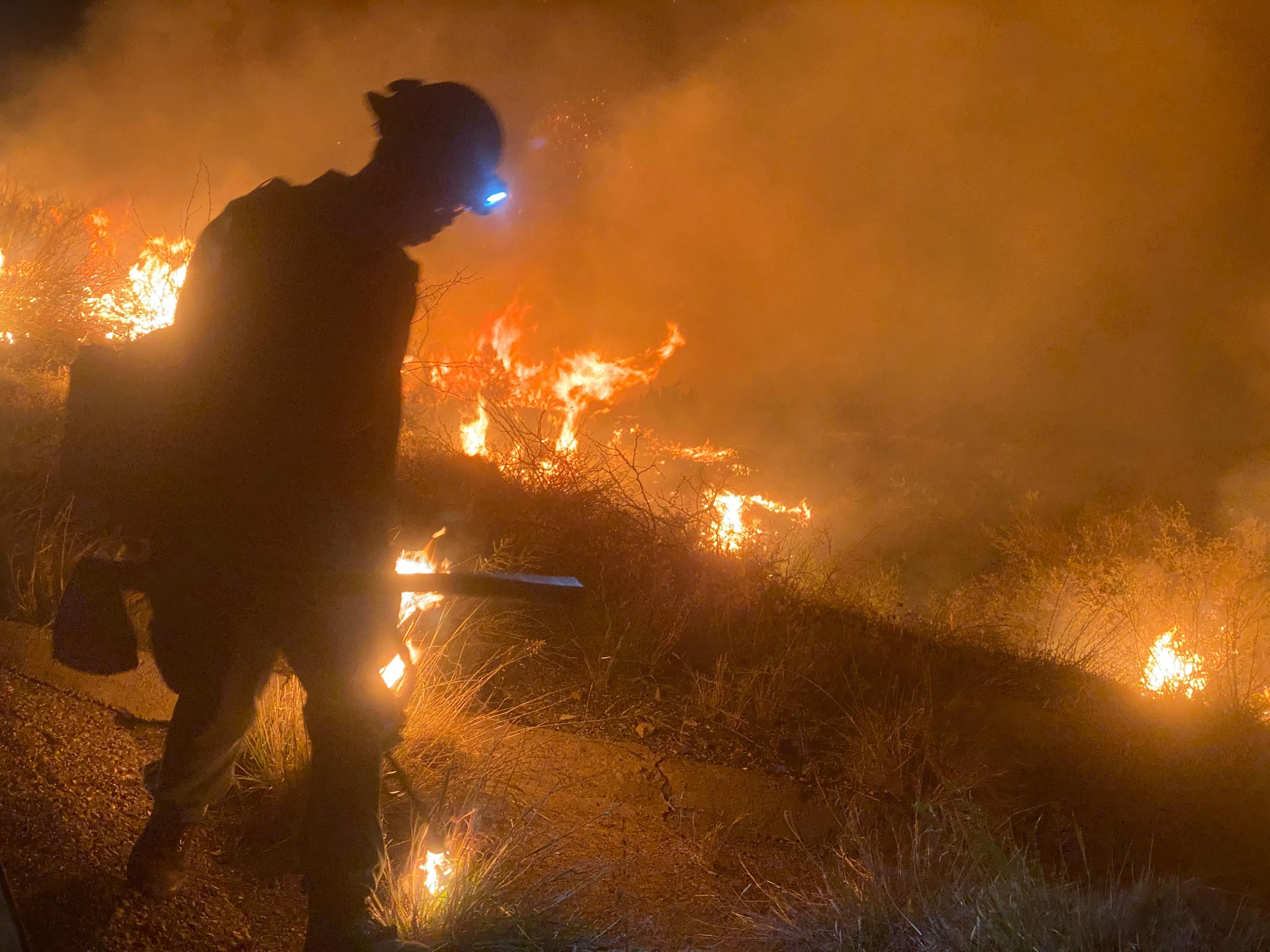
- The Copper Canyon fire burning on May 8, 2021
- Date: May 7, 2021–May 24, 2021
- Location: Globe, Arizona
- Coordinates: 33.449°N 110.748°W

Statistics
- Burned area: 2,875 acres (1,163 ha)

Impacts
- Deaths: 0
- Structures lost: 0

Ignition
- Cause: Human Caused

Map
- Location within Arizona

The Copper Canyon Fire was a wildfire that started near the town of Globe, Arizona on May 7, 2021. The fire burned a total of 2,875 acres (1,163 ha) and was fully contained on May 24, 2021.

== Development ==
=== May ===
The Copper Canyon Fire was first reported on May 7, 2021, at around 9am MST. The cause of the fire is believed to be human caused, but is still under investigation.

=== Containment ===
As of May 24, 2021, the fire is fully contained.
