= 2021 Arizona wildfires =

Natural disasters in the USA

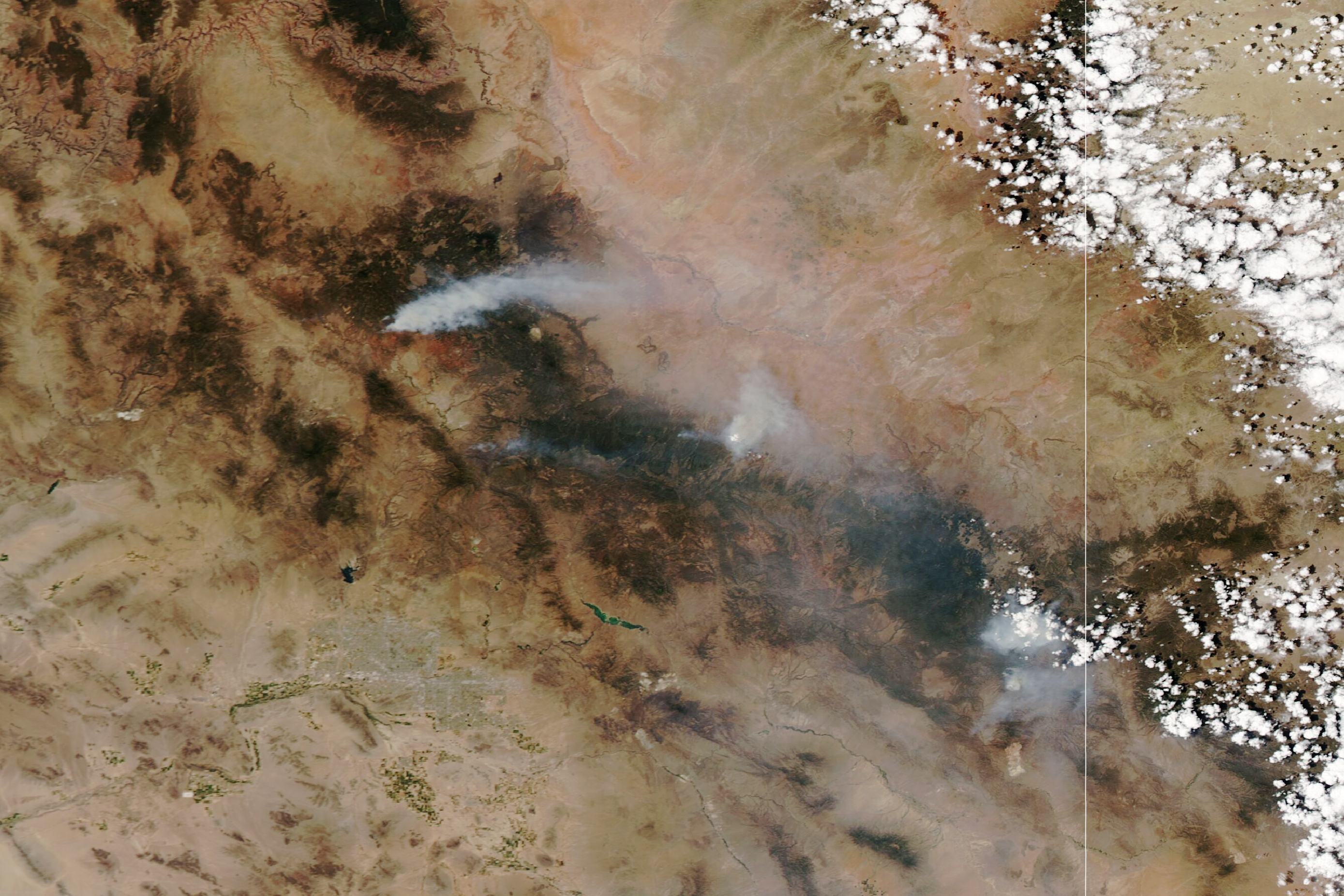
1 / Rafael Fire; 2 / Wyrick Fire	3 / Horton Complex Fire; 4 / Bear Fire
Smoke over parts of Arizona on June 21 due to an outbreak of wildfires in the state

Statistics
- Total fires: 1,773
- Total area: 524,428 acres (212,228 ha)

Impacts
- Deaths: 2

Wildfires across the US state of Arizona burned 524,428 acres (212,228 ha) of land in at least 1,773 fires, fueled in part by a drought, hot temperatures, and thunderstorms producing dry lightning. At one point in late June, over 20 active wildfires were burning across the state.

The total acres burned between the start of the year and the end of June was 22% more than during the same period of the preceding season, which itself was the most active in nearly a decade. The spike in wildfires in Arizona during the summer was due to an ongoing megadrought that is occurring in the Southwestern United States, as well as a heat wave with many western cities hitting record-breaking temperatures.

== Background ==
Heat wave ravaging the Southwestern U.S. (June 13–19, 2021)

The Arizona wildfire season usually begins in May and lasts through mid-July, when the North American Monsoon provides the Southwestern U.S with heavy rainfall to slow down fire activity throughout the region. But in June 2021, the Telegraph Fire became the 6th largest wildfire in Arizona history. Wildfires in Arizona at the time were making headlines due to a ridge of high pressure hovering over much of the southwest and severe drought also playing a major role in the Arizona wildfire season with more than 50% of the state being in 'Exceptional Drought'. The drought in the southwest was making the job of fighting wildland fires difficult because of water shortages in the region. At the time, Arizona was also seeing record-breaking temperatures with Phoenix hitting a high of 118 °F (47 °C) on June 17. Earlier on June 9, governor Doug Ducey issued Declarations of Emergency in response to the Telegraph and Mescal fires. The declarations provided up to $400,000 (USD) for efforts of response to wildfires. From June 14 to June 20, dry thunderstorms rolled into Arizona and produced dry lighting which spawned a larger outbreak of wildfires throughout the state. The outbreak got so bad that at one point, five out of six national forests had to be closed to the public in late June. These national forests included the Coconino, Kaibab, Prescott, Tonto and Apache-Sitgreaves national forests. The only people who were allowed in the forests were firefighters and people who owned property in the forests.

== List of wildfires ==
The following is a list of fires that burned more than 1,000 acres (400 ha), or produced significant structural damage or casualties.

Name	County	Acres	Start date	Containment date (Note: Containment means that fire crews have established and secured control lines around the fire's perimeter. These lines are artificial barriers, like trenches or cleared vegetation, designed to stop the fire's spread, or natural barriers like rivers. Containment reflects progress in managing the fire but does not necessarily mean the fire is starved of fuel, under control, or put out.)	Notes	Ref
Margo	Pinal	1,148	April 8	April 13	Human Caused; wildfire destroyed 17 structures, 12 of them were homes.	
Bonito Rock	Apache	1,668	April 19	May 6	Cause is Under Investigation	
Flag	Mohave	1,265	April 25	June 7	Cause is Under Investigation	
Copper Canyon	Gila	2,875	May 7	May 24	Human Caused; started 3 miles northeast of Globe	
Tussock	Yavapai	5,546	May 8	May 24	Human Caused – Specific cause under investigation	
Boggy Creek	Apache	2,945	May 23	May 31	Lightning-Sparked	
Sycamore Canyon	Pima	1,858	May 23	June 4	Cause is Under Investigation	
McDonald Tank	Apache	3,550	May 23	June 22	Cause is Under Investigation	
Warren	Cochise	1,400	May 25	June 7	Cause is Under Investigation	
Spur	Yavapai	153	May 27	May 30	Human Caused; the fire destroyed 20 structures (including 13 homes) in the mining town of Bagdad	
Mescal	Gila	72,250	June 1	June 18	Cause is Under Investigation	
Telegraph	Pinal, Gila	180,757	June 4	July 3	Human Caused; the fire has destroyed 51 structures. It is the largest wildfire in Arizona in the 2021 wildfire season so far.	
Slate	Coconino	11,435	June 7	July 5	Cause is Unknown; fire started 23 miles Northwest of Flagstaff	
Shamrock	Santa Cruz	1,104	June 9	June 16	Cause is Under Investigation; burned in the Patagonia Mountains	
Pinnacle	Graham	34,437	June 10	July 16	Cause is Under Investigation; the fire burned in the Santa Teresa Mountains	
Cornville	Yavapai	1,240	June 13	June 21	Cause is Under Investigation; the fire burned 2 miles east of Cornville	
Winchester	Cochise	1,800	June 14	June 20	Lightning-Sparked	
Bear	Greenlee	24,067	June 16	September 8	Lightning-Sparked	
Horton Complex	Greenlee	12,263	June 16	July 13	Lightning-Sparked; the fire burned within the 2011 Wallow Fire burn scar	
Backbone	Yavapai, Gila, Coconino	40,855	June 16	July 19	Lightning-Sparked; the fire was sparked 12 miles west of Strawberry	
Rafael	Yavapai, Coconino	78,065	June 18	July 15	Lightning-Sparked; the fire exploded in size on June 20 due to high winds	
West Chev	Coconino	1,170	June 19	July 2	Lightning-Sparked	
Wyrick	Navajo	7,592	June 19	July 3	Lightning-Sparked	
Walnut	Cochise	10,667	June 20	June 29	Lightning-Sparked	
Alamo	Santa Cruz	4,953	June 20	June 30	Fire extends into Mexico – area given is Arizona only. An additional 4,386 acres (1,775 ha) are burning in Mexico	
MM 25 I-15	Mohave	1,007	June 24	July 2	Cause is Under Investigation	
Planet Ranch	La Paz, Mohave	1,260	June 24	July 3	Lightning-Sparked	
Bottom	Graham	6,004	June 28	July 14	Lightning-Sparked	
Middle	Yavapai	2,792	June 29	July 23	Lightning-Sparked	
Midway	Yavapai	1,762	June 30	July 16	Lightning-Sparked	
Tiger	Yavapai	16,278	June 30	July 30	Lightning-Sparked	
Firebox	Apache	1,063	July 7	July 23	Lightning-Sparked	
Snap Point	Mohave	9,843	July 10	July 13	Lightning-Sparked	
Elements	Mohave	1,343	July 11	July 18	Lightning-Sparked	
Lime	Mohave	2,063	July 12	July 16	Cause is Under Investigation	

== Evacuations ==
Location of wildfires and which nearby areas had to be evacuated. Only those wildfires that caused evacuations are listed.
- Wildfires originated in April
- Wildfires originated in May
- Wildfires originated in June
- Areas evacuated
- Areas that lost structures

Margo Fire: Dudleyville

Flag Fire: Pine Lake

Tussock Fire: Fort Misery and Horsethief Basin

Spur Fire: Bagdad

Telegraph Fire: El Capitan, Dripping Springs, Miami, Top-of-the-World, Government Springs, Wind Spirit, Hagen Ranch, and Slash S Ranch

Pinnacle Fire: Klondyke and Aravaipa

Cornville Fire: Parts of Cornville (East of Page Springs Road)

Backbone Fire: Strawberry and Pine

Rafael Fire: Areas around Sycamore Canyon

Wyrick Fire: Antelope Valley and portions of Heber

West Chev Fire: Woods Canyon Lake

Walnut Fire: Residents near Dragoon

Tiger Fire: Horsethief Basin

== See also ==
- List of Arizona wildfires
- List of natural disasters in the United States
