= 2022 Arizona wildfires =

Natural disasters in the USA

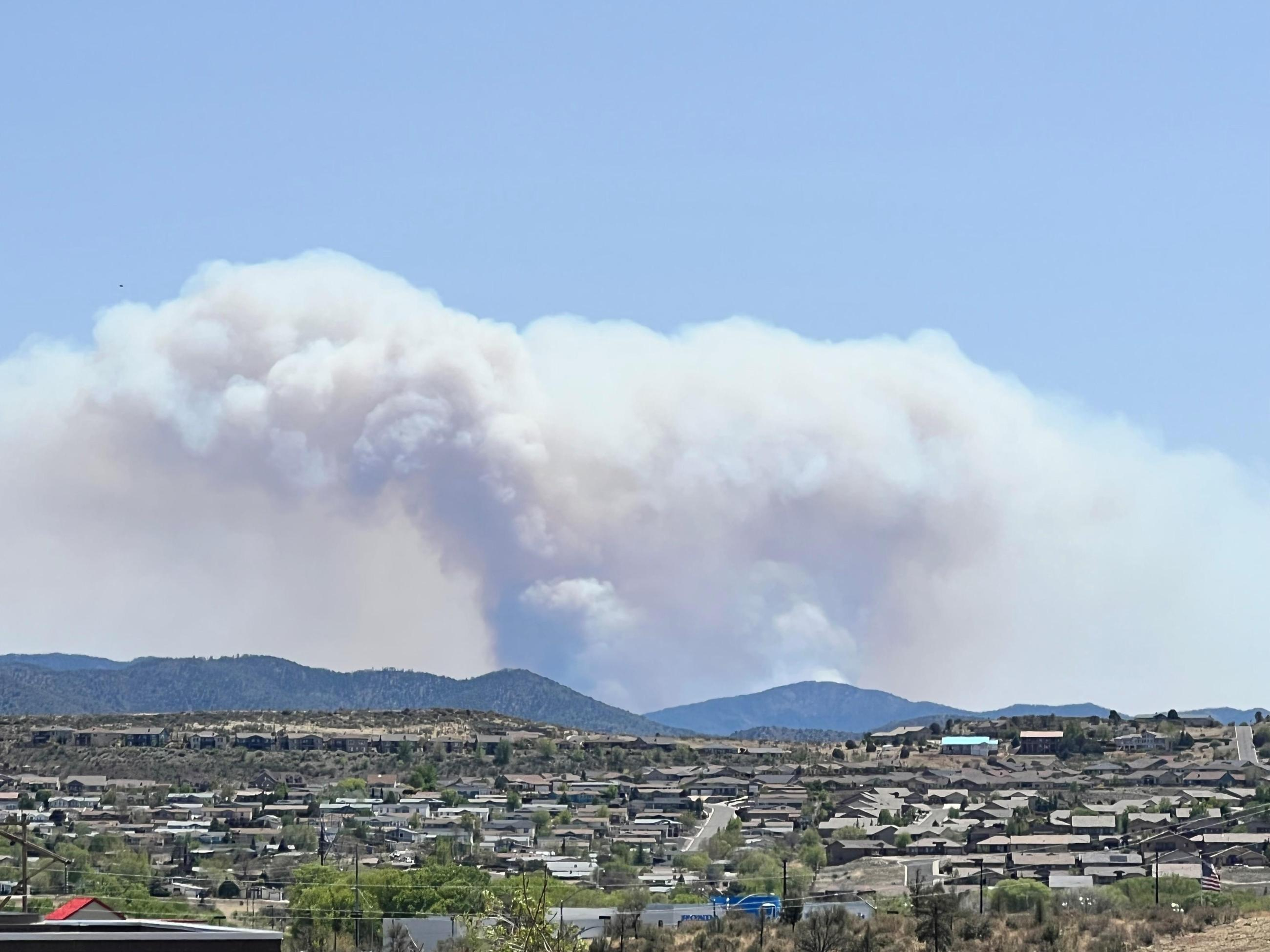
- Plumes of smoke from the Crooks Fire seen from Prescott, Arizona, on April 24, 2022

Statistics
- Total fires: 1,263
- Total area: 143,601 acres (58,113 hectares)

Impacts
- Deaths: 3
- Injuries: 6
- Structures lost: 700
- Cost: Unknown

According to statistics published by the Southwest Coordination Center (an interagency government organization providing logistical and other support for wildland fire incidents), 1,263 wildfires burned 143,601 acres (58,113 hectares) in the US state of Arizona in 2022.

On April 20, 2022, the Tunnel Fire, the biggest incident of the year in Arizona, burned thousands of acres north of Flagstaff. This included the entirety of Sunset Crater Volcano National Monument. More than 700 homeowners were forced to evacuate, and at least 30 structures were destroyed. A state of emergency was also declared.

== Background ==
Historically, while peak fire times were from June to July before monsoon season, wildfires now occur at any time of year. Wildfire conditions are influenced by heavy drought and dryness in the state, but snowmelt in the mountains leads to vegetation growth. With decreasing precipitation in spring, fires tend to start earlier. Monsoons affect fire conditions, with above-average monsoons hindering fires and below-average allowing them to spread. Dryness common in Arizona quickly dries out vegetation, allowing dangerous fire conditions.

== Summary ==
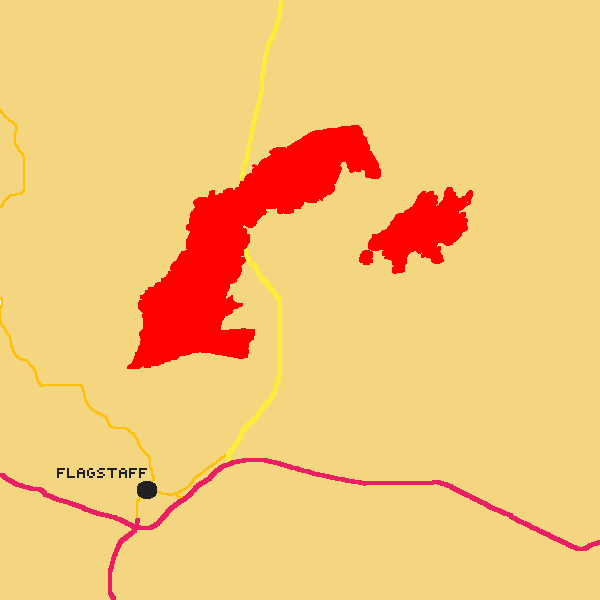

During the 2021-22 winter, a returning La Niña in parts of Arizona led to potential for an early fire season start from minimal precipitation and snowpack and above-average temperatures. Low moisture in February further reduced the snowpack, exacerbating fire conditions around the state. The La Niña persisted, providing prime wildfire conditions from April to June. They contributed to the Tunnel and Crooks Fires in April, which both lasted until June. Wildfires continued almost "daily" from June to July in Southern Arizona. The Arizona Department of Forestry and Fire Management (DFFM) and other local and federal agencies overloaded resources, allowing most fires to be managed under Type 3 or local suppression strategies.

Monsoon season began in July, bringing heavy precipitation and moisture. This essentially put an end to fire season with persistent moisture, but lead to growth of new vegetation. However, in October after monsoon season, warm and dry conditions caused a slight increase in wildfires in Southern Arizona. Overall, wildfire ignitions in fall and winter were minimal.

At least three wildfires were reported near Flagstaff and caused hundreds of people to evacuate. However, two of the three reported fires, which are the Haywire and Double fires, combined on June 13. Before the merger of both of the fires, the Double Fire burned 500 acres (200 ha). The first wildfire to be discovered was the Pipeline Fire on June 12 at around 10:15 AM (MST); By Monday evening on June 13, the fire burned 5,000 acres (2,000 ha). As of June 13, 2022, no injuries or deaths have been reported, and one structure has been destroyed. A total of 26 homes in Timberline were lost in the tunnel fire in April 2022.

Overall, acreage and wildfire count was below average and significantly less than 2021, possibly because of heavy suppression operations and a lack of wildfire ignitions in areas dense with fuel. The cause of that fire remains unknown, although citizens blame the USFS for not thoroughly extinguishing a controlled burn. That was never proven. The pipeline fire was caused by a simpleton from Louisiana burning his used toilet paper in the middle of a blinding wind storm and up to 65 mph gusts, necessitating several days of "red flag warnings". The pipeline and haywire fires were deemed 100% contained two weeks later when monsoon storms put the fires out, but severe, persistent and life-threatening post fire/burn scar flash flooding began immediately in its stead.

== List of wildfires ==
The following is a list of fires that burned more than 1,000 acres (400 ha), produced significant structural damage or casualties, or were otherwise notable.

Name	County	Acres	Start date	Containment date (Note: Containment means that fire crews have established and secured control lines around the fire's perimeter. These lines are artificial barriers, like trenches or cleared vegetation, designed to stop the fire's spread, or natural barriers like rivers. Containment reflects progress in managing the fire but does not necessarily mean the fire is starved of fuel, under control, or put out.)	Notes	Ref
Ranch	Apache	1,600	March 1	2022	Was 95% contained on March 2. Suspected to be human-caused and burned 4.5 miles (7.2 km) southwest of Concho.	
Presumido Peak	Pima	2,591	March 26	April 3	Human-caused. The National Centers for Environmental Information documented that over $800,000 (2022 USD) was spent to extinguish the fire.	
Tunnel	Coconino	19,088	April 17	June 3	Undetermined cause	
Crooks	Yavapai	9,402	April 18	June 27	Undetermined cause. The fire started 11 miles (18 km) south of Prescott. It was 96% contained on May 25 but, due to inaccessible terrain, it took until June 27 to contain the remaining 4%.	
San Rafael	Santa Cruz	11,620	May 7	May 15	Undetermined cause. Burned 22 miles (35 km) southeast of Patagonia.	
Elgin Bridge	Santa Cruz	2,149	May 22	May 31	Believed to be human-caused. Burned just northeast of Elgin and prompted evacuations.	
Lost Lake	Santa Cruz, Riverside (CA)	5,856	May 25	June 6	Undetermined cause. Burned 14 miles (23 km) southwest of Parker.	
Contreas	Pima	29,482	June 11	June 24	Lightning-caused. Destroyed structures and prompted evacuations for Kitt Peak National Observatory.	
Tonto Canyon	Santa Cruz, Mexico	9,264	June 11	2022	Undetermined cause. Was 75% contained as of November 17. and burned 3,000 acres (1,200 ha; 12 km^{2}) separate area in Mexico.	
Pipeline	Coconino	26,532	June 11	July 29	Undetermined cause. Burned 6 miles (9.7 km) north of Flagstaff and destroyed one home. Merged with the Haywire Fire.	
Haywire	Coconino	5,575	June 12	July 29	Undetermined cause. Burned 7.5 miles (12.1 km) northeast of Doney Park. Merged with the Pipeline Fire.	
Pine Peak	Mohave	1,631	July 15	August 4	Lightning-caused. Burned about 20 miles (32 km) southeast of Kingman.	
Dragon	Coconino	1,362	July 15	2022	Lightning-caused. Was managed as a prescribed burn and closed portions of the North Rim.	
