= Baker Canyon Fire =

2016 wildfire near Douglas, Arizona, USA

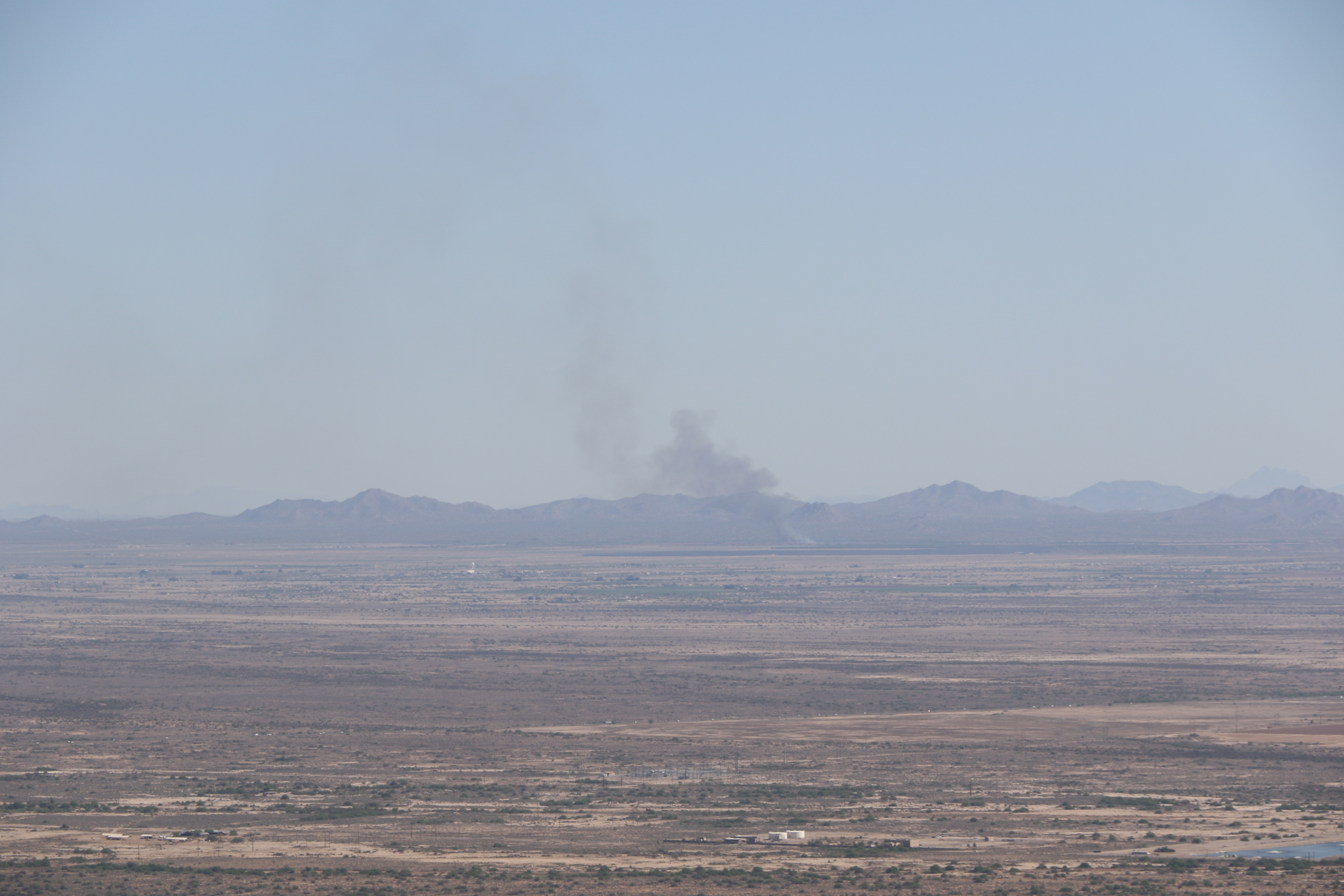
- View of smoke from the fire as seen in Phoenix, over two hundred miles away
- Date: March 21, 2016 – March 28, 2016
- Location: Northeast of Douglas, Arizona
- Coordinates: 31.404°N 109.08°W

Statistics
- Burned area: 7,980 acres (32 km^{2})

Map
- Location of fire in Arizona

The Baker Canyon Fire was wildfire that began on March 3, 2016 northeast of Douglas, Arizona. By the time the fire was contained it had burned 7,980 acres (32.3 km^{2}) of land in both Arizona and New Mexico.
