= Rafael Fire =

2021 wildfire in Arizona, USA

- Part of the 2021 Arizona wildfires
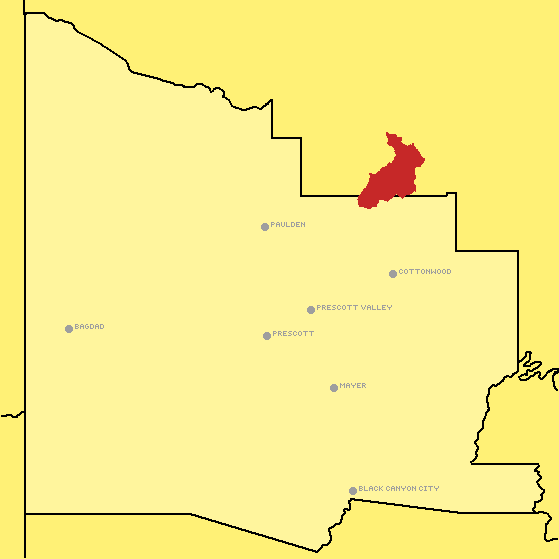
- The Rafael Fire (in red) burned from Yavapai County into Coconino County.
- Date: June 18, 2021 – July 15, 2021
- Location: Perkinsville, Arizona
- Coordinates: 34.942°N 112.162°W

Statistics
- Burned area: 78,065 acres (31,592 ha)

Impacts
- Structures lost: 1

Ignition
- Cause: Lightning

The Rafael Fire was a wildfire that started near Perkinsville, Arizona on June 18, 2021. The fire has burned 78,065 acres (31,592 ha) and was fully contained on July 15, 2021.

== Events ==
The Rafael Fire was first reported on June 18, 2021, at around 7:27 pm MST. The cause of the fire is believed to be due to lightning. On July 15, 2021, the Rafael Fire reached 100% containment.

== Impact ==
=== Closures and Evacuations ===
The Coconino National Forest was fully closed on June 23, 2021, due to fire danger, dry conditions, persistent wildfire activity, and limited availability of firefighting resources. The Coconino National Forest was reopened on July 6, 2021.
