= Topock Fire =

2016 wildfire in Arizona and California, USA

- Date: April 4, 2016 – April 9, 2016
- Location: Needles, California and Topock, Arizona
- Coordinates: 34.761°N 114.524°W

Statistics
- Burned area: 2,232 acres (9 km^{2})

Map
- Location within USA West

The Topock Fire (known as the Pirate Fire in California) was a fire that burned in Arizona and California, and was named for nearby Topock, Arizona.
