= Backbone Fire =

2021 wildfire in Arizona, USA

- Part of the 2021 Arizona wildfires
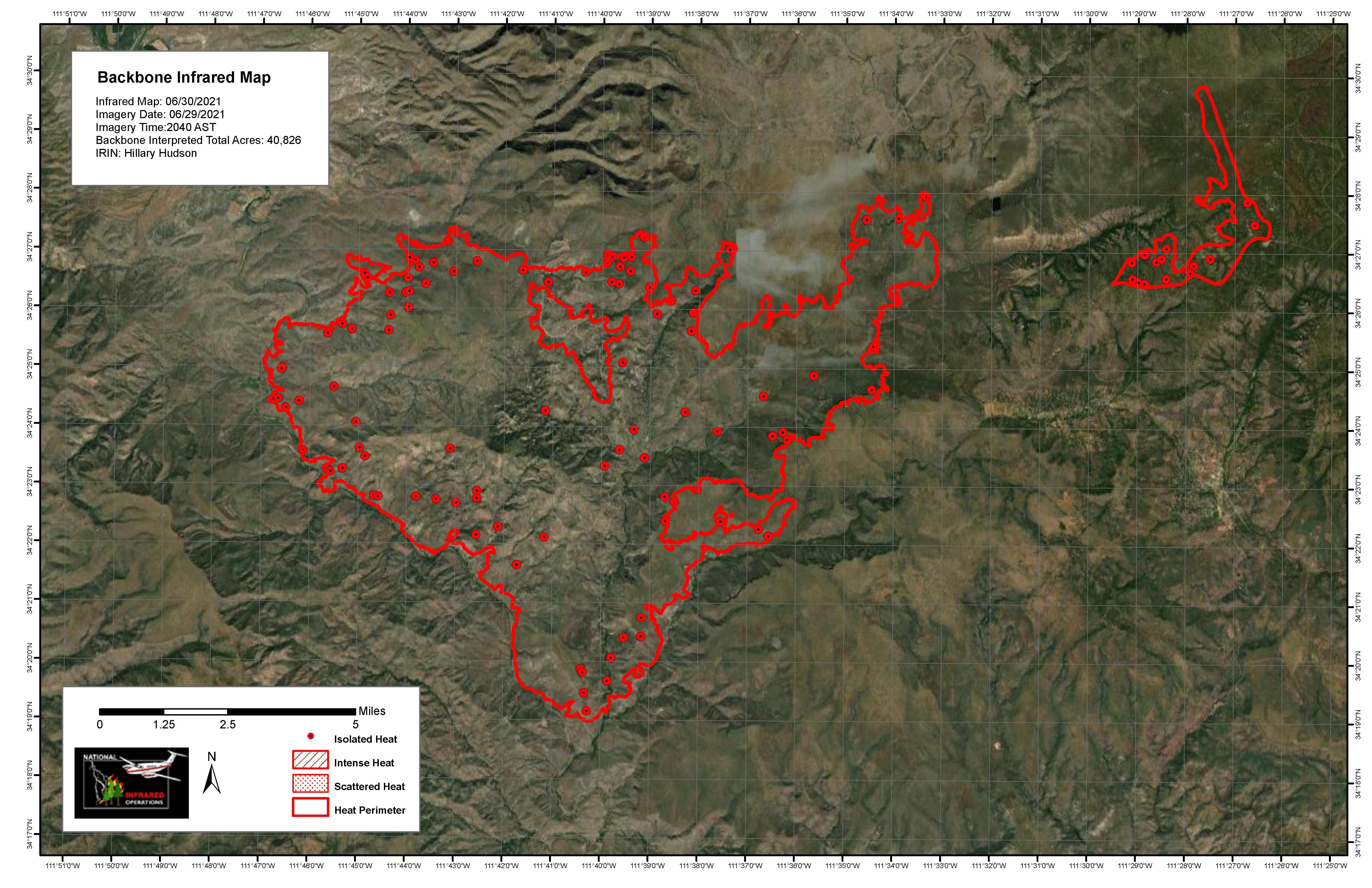
- Map of the Backbone Fire on June 30
- Date: June 16, 2021 – July 19, 2021
- Location: Payson, Arizona
- Coordinates: 34.344°N 111.677°W

Statistics
- Burned area: 40,855 acres (16,533 ha)

Ignition
- Cause: Lightning

Map
- Location in Central Arizona Backbone Fire (the United States)

The Backbone Fire was a wildfire that started near Payson, Arizona on June 16, 2021. The fire burned 40,855 acres (16,533 ha) was fully contained on July 19, 2021.

== Events ==
The Backbone Fire was first reported on June 16, 2021, at 11:30 pm MST. The cause of the fire is believed to be due to lightning. On July 19, 2021, the Backbone Fire reached 100% containment.

== Impact ==
=== Closures and evacuations ===
Fossil Creek Recreation Area was closed on June 17, 2021, due to wildfire danger. On June 19, 2021, the USDA Forest Service Coconino National Forest issued an Emergency Area Closure of areas around the Backbone Fire on the Coconino and Tonto National Forests. The Coconino National Forest was fully closed on June 23, 2021, due to fire danger, dry conditions, persistent wildfire activity, and limited availability of firefighting resources. The Coconino National Forest was reopened on July 6, 2021.
