= Ikes Fire =

2019 wildfire in Arizona, United States

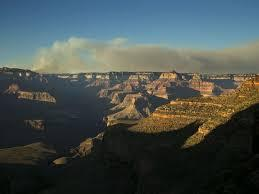
- Date: July 25, 2019 – 2019
- Location: Grand Canyon National Park and Kaibab National Forest, Arizona
- Coordinates: 36.349°N 112.285°W

Statistics
- Burned area: 16,416 acres (6,643 ha)

Impacts
- Cost: $4.6 million

Ignition
- Cause: Lightning

Map
- Location in Arizona

The Ikes Fire was a 2019 wildfire that burned 16,416 acres (6,643 ha) in Grand Canyon National Park and Kaibab National Forest in Arizona. A lightning strike on July 25, 2019, was determined to be the cause. The Ikes Fire was also being utilized to fulfill its natural role within a fire-dependent ecosystem (Fire ecology) while providing for point protection of identified sensitive natural and cultural resources. Resource objectives included reducing hazardous fuels, promoting forest regeneration, improving wildlife habitat, and restoring more open forest understory. These objectives will lead to a healthier and more resilient landscape.

Although the final number of firefighters and resources deployed to fight the blaze is unknown, as of August 17, 2019 they included 1 hand crew, 7 fire engines, and 1 helicopter for a total of 88 personnel. Gusty winds subsequently prevented firefighters from carrying out firing operations. Crews patrolled the perimeter on the northeast and eastern portions of the fire while other personnel continued to prep the west side of Forest Service Road 223. As of September 26, 2019, an additional two Aerial firefighting heavy-lift helicopters had been brought in to assist with the firefighting efforts. The helicopters utilized water from the Colorado River to drop on the fire to halt its spread.

As of August 17, 2019 the estimated cost of the Ikes fire was estimated at around $4.6 million.

== Gallery ==
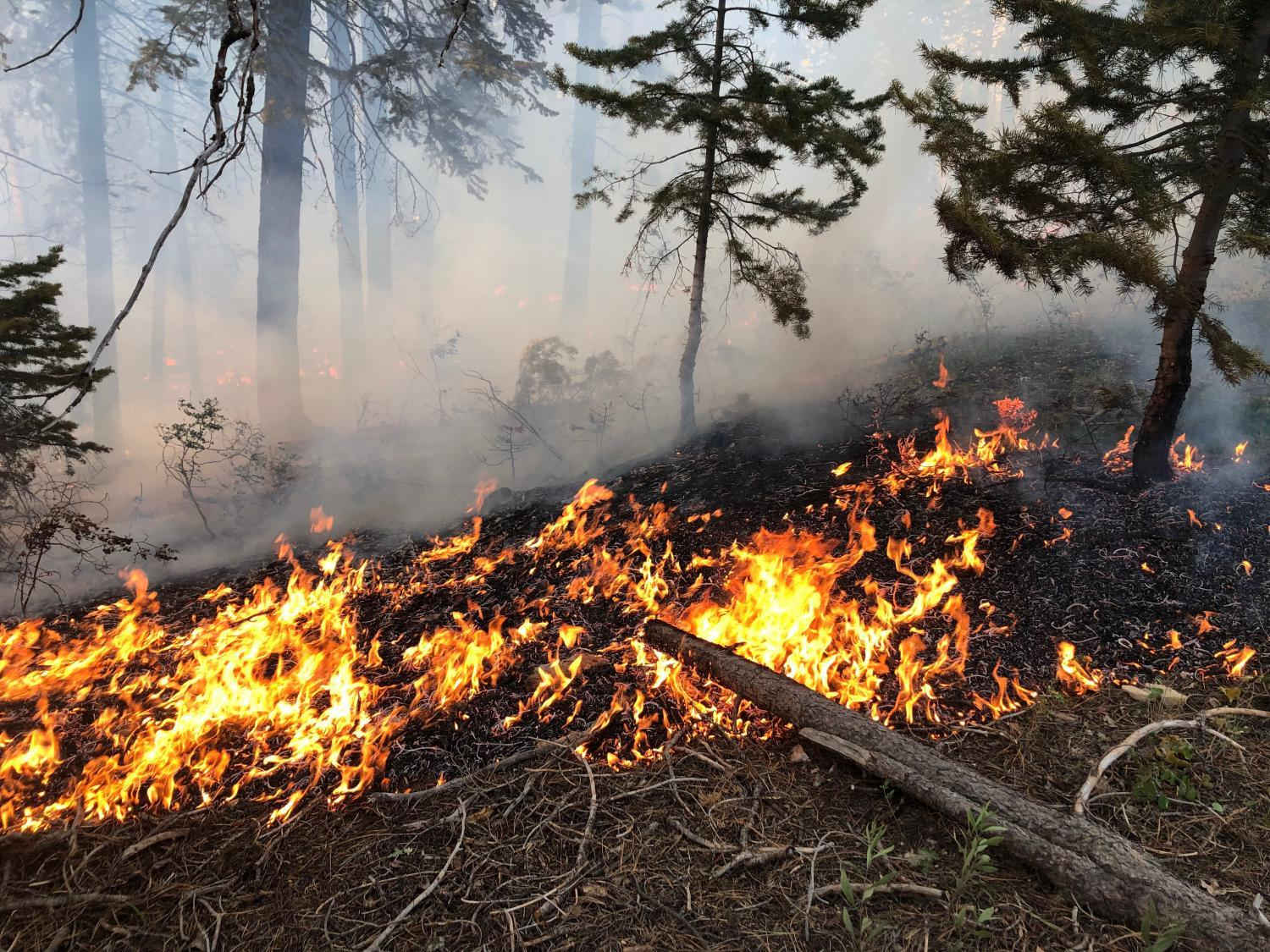
Closeup view of fire

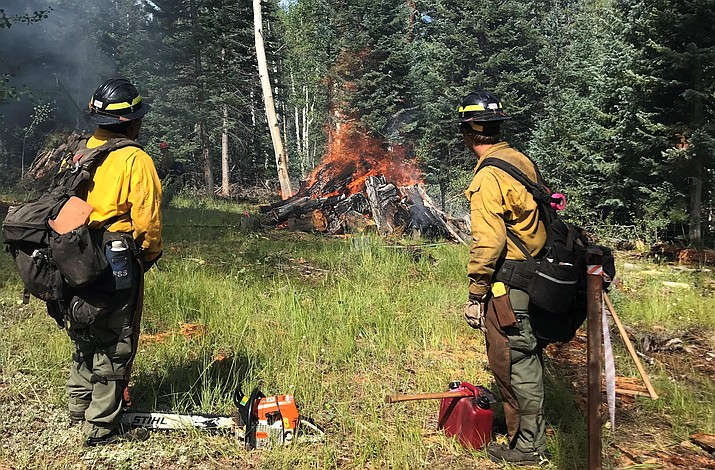
Burning piles to improve control lines
