= Fort Misery, Arizona =

Ghost town in Yavapai County

- Populated place
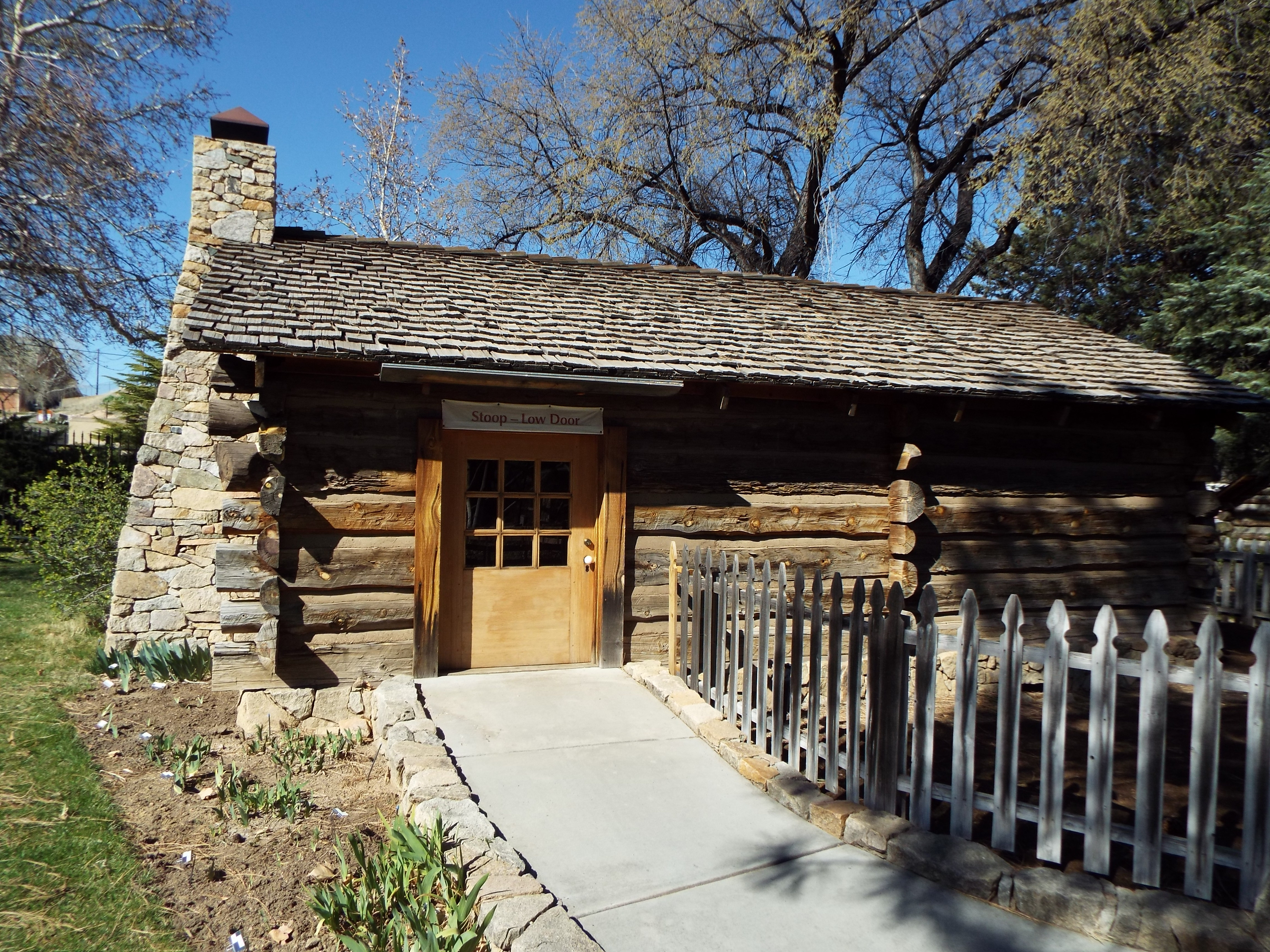
- Fort Misery Log Cabin built in 1864

- Location within the state of Arizona Fort Misery (the United States)
- Coordinates: 34°08′25″N 112°22′00″W
- Country: United States
- State: Arizona
- County: Yavapai
- Elevation: 4,354 ft (1,327 m)
- Time zone: UTC-7 (Mountain (MST))
  - Summer (DST): UTC-7 (MST)
- Area code: 928
- FIPS code: 04-24890
- GNIS feature ID: 29118

Fort Misery is a ghost town situated in Yavapai County, Arizona, United States. It has an estimated elevation of 4,354 feet (1,327 m) above sea level.
