= Mescal Fire =

2021 wildfire in Globe, Arizona, USA

- Part of the 2021 Arizona wildfires
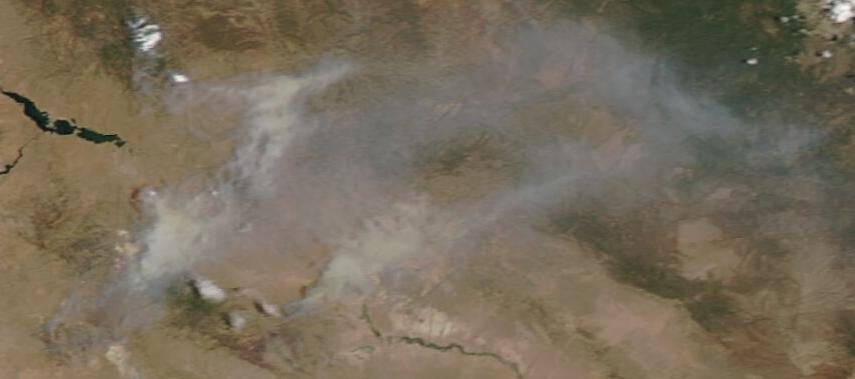
- Smoke from the Mescal and Telegraph Fires as seen from space
- Date: June 1, 2021 – June 18, 2021
- Location: Globe, Arizona
- Coordinates: 33.166°N 110.664°W

Statistics
- Burned area: 72,250 acres (29,239 ha)

Impacts
- Structures lost: 0

Ignition
- Cause: Under Investigation

Map
- Location in Southern Arizona

The Mescal Fire is a wildfire that started near Globe, Arizona on June 1, 2021. The fire burned 72,250 acres (29,239 ha) and was fully contained on June 18, 2021.

== Events ==
=== June ===
The Mescal Fire was first reported at around 11 am MST on June 1, 2021.

=== Cause ===
The cause of the fire is under investigation.

=== Containment ===
On June 18, 2021, the Mescal Fire reached 100% containment.

== Impact ==
=== Closures and Evacuations ===
The Mescal Fire has led to a number of closures and evacuations.

On June 4, 2021, the Gila County Division of Health and Emergency Management issued evacuation alerts for residents in the El Capitan area, east of State Route 77, Soda Canyon area, the community north of Route 3, Old San Carlos Junction up to Highway 70, and the Beverly Hills Community area.
