= Schultz Fire =

2010 wildfire in Arizona, USA

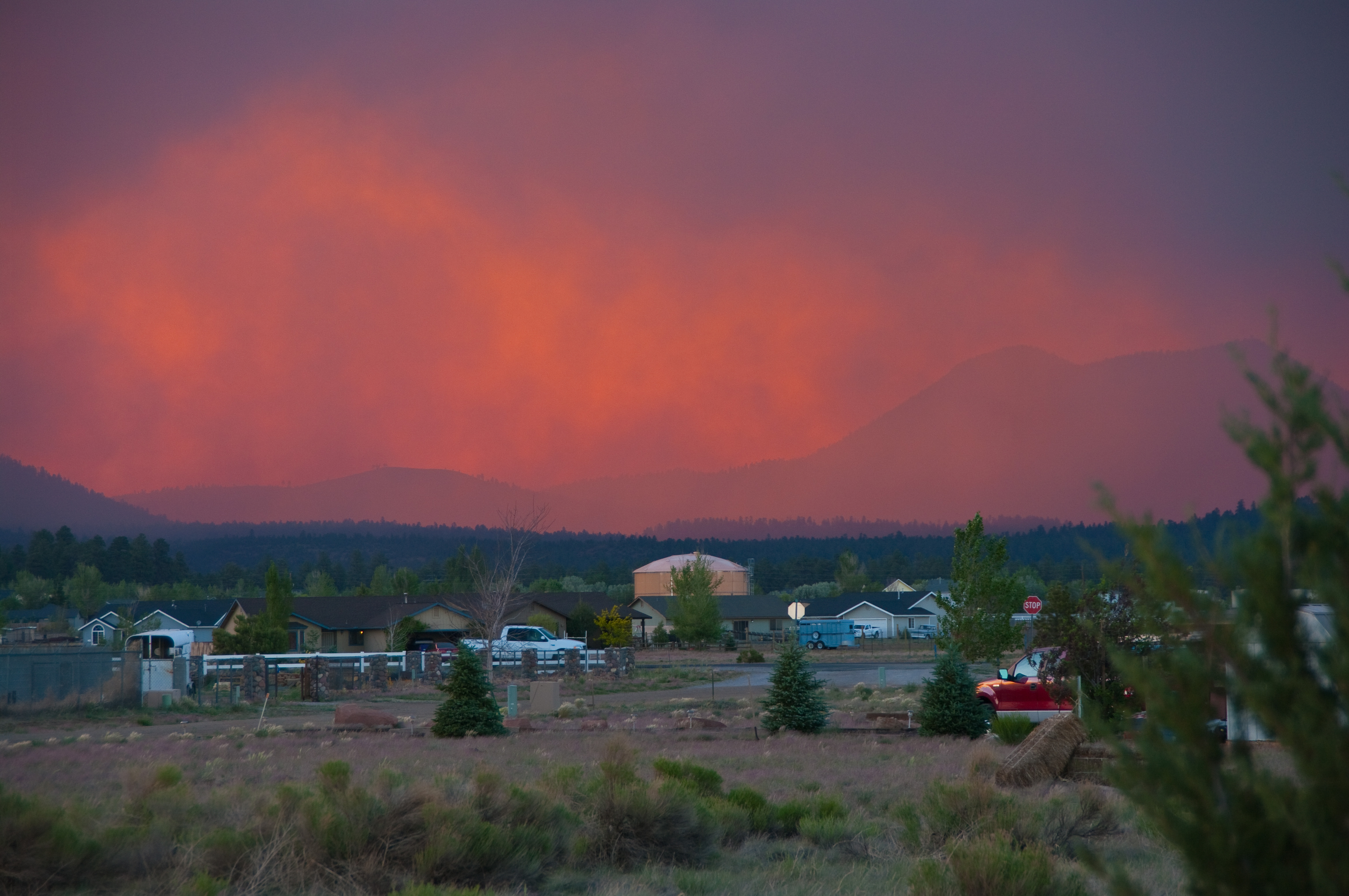
- View of the fire on June 20th
- Date: 20 June 2010 — 15 July 2010
- Location: Coconino National Forest
- Coordinates: 35.4015°N 111.5266°W

Statistics
- Burned area: 15000
- Land use: National Forest

The Schultz Fire was a wildfire which burned over 15,000 acres (6,100 ha), including Schultz Peak in Coconino National Forest near Flagstaff, Arizona, in June 2010. The suspected cause is a campfire left unattended, and the United States Forest Service is offering a $2500 reward for information.

The Schultz Fire began at 11:09 a.m. June 20 north of Flagstaff and grew rapidly due to high winds, requiring the Coconino County sheriff to close U.S. 89 and evacuate 748 homes, an animal shelter, Sunset Crater and Wupatki National Monument. 300 firefighters responded, including personnel from the U.S. Forest Service and a Type One Incident Management Team, sent to events of "national significance".

== Timeline ==
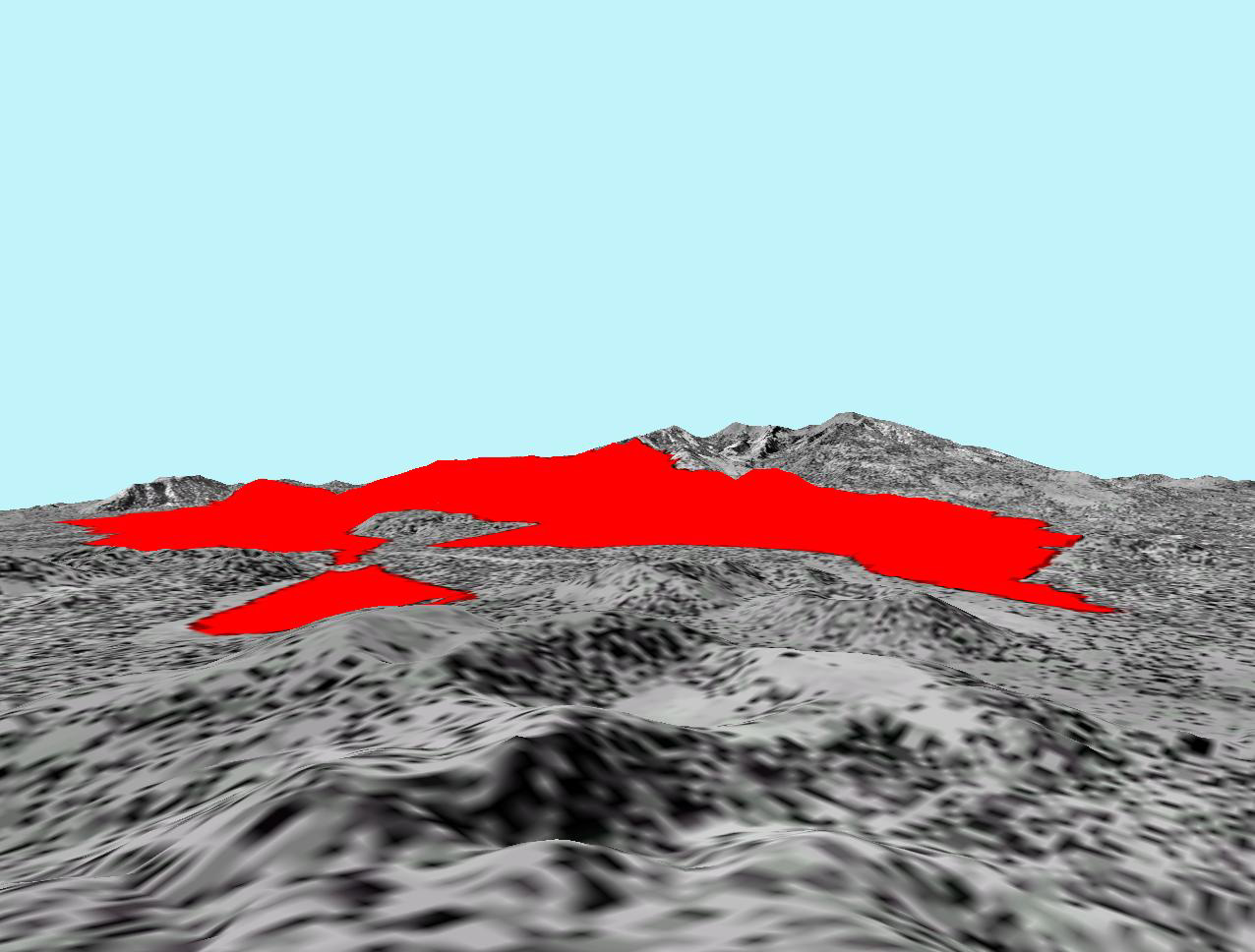
3D map of the fire at its outbreak

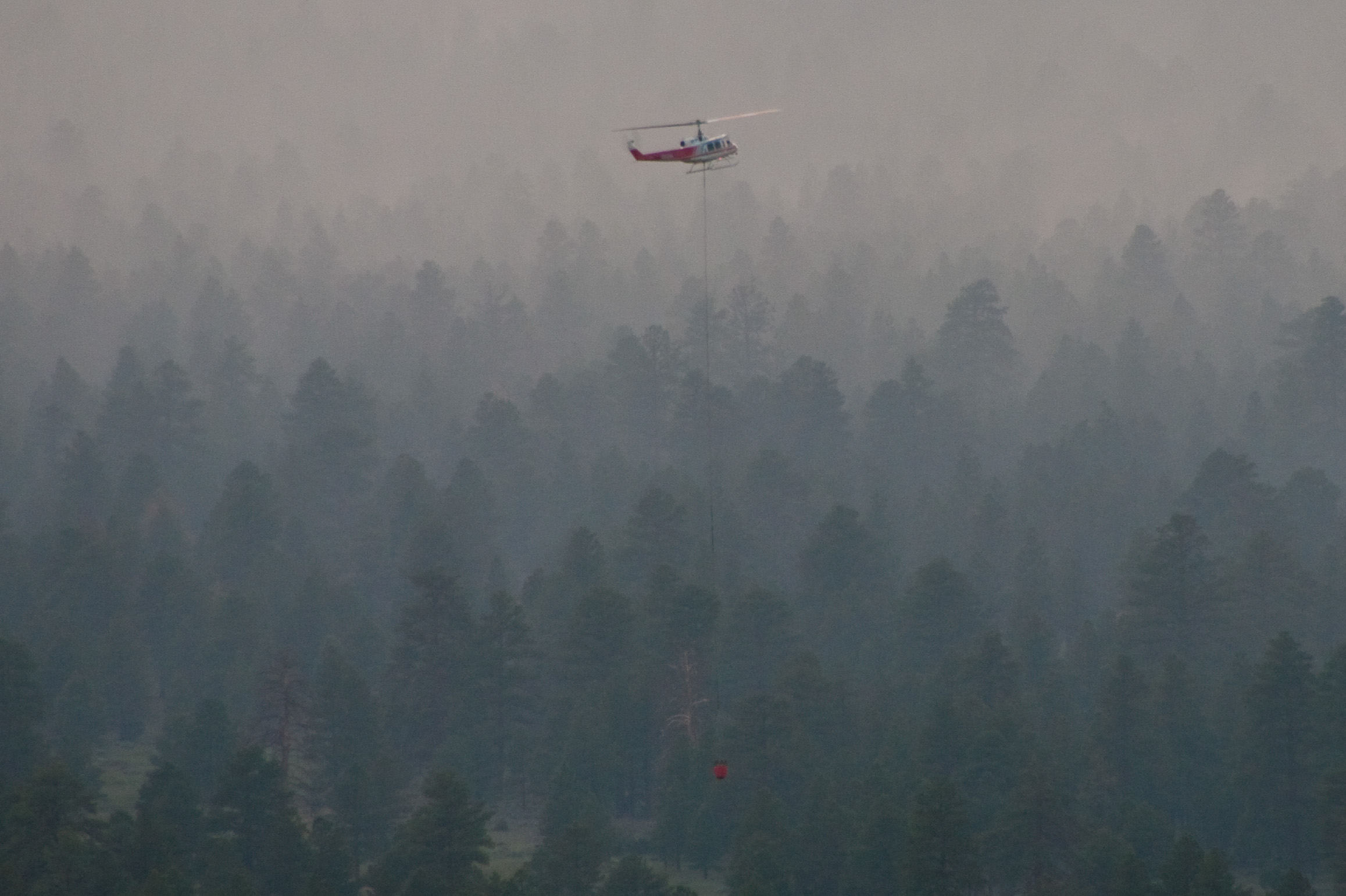
Several days into firefighting, a helicopter bucket is deployed

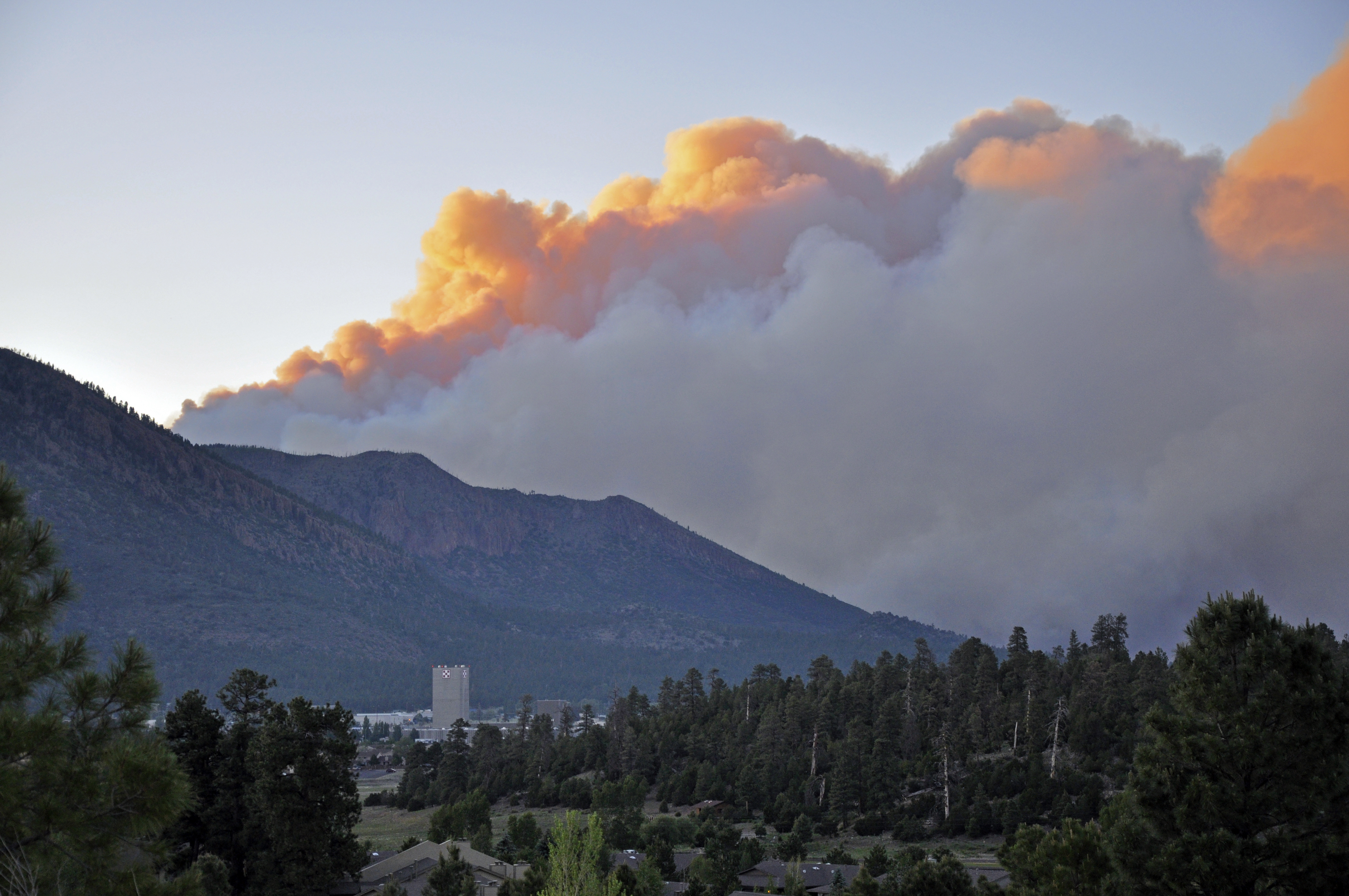
Schultz Fire

On June 22, the fire was 20 percent contained and approximately one thousand people were allowed to return to their homes. By that time 14,000 acres (5,700 ha) had burned and 800 firefighters were fighting the blaze. The southern end of the fire was five miles (8 km) from Flagstaff. Smoke in the Flagstaff area resulted from backfires.

Also on June 22, Arizona governor Jan Brewer flew over the fire and succeeded in getting federal fire management assistance. 756 area residents went back to their homes June 23. At that point, only two firefighters had been injured and no homes were destroyed. Personnel from as distant as Idaho were working the fire.

By June 25 the fire was 40 percent contained, largely due to backfires which created a great deal of smoke in Flagstaff.

On June 29, firefighters continued to spray water on Doyle Peak. The major concern was stabilizing the burned areas of Doyle Peak and Schultz Peak to prevent erosion and mudslides such as that after the 1977 Radio Fire on Mount Elden. Forests such as aspen could grow quickly, but cutting down burned trees or adding hay would be other techniques to use to stabilize slopes.

On July 1 some trails in the Coconino National Forest reopened as the fire was pronounced contained, and a Type III Incident Management Team took over July 2. Rehabilitation of burned areas began.

On July 15 additional areas reopened to the public, while others remained off limits until September 15.

== Earlier fire ==
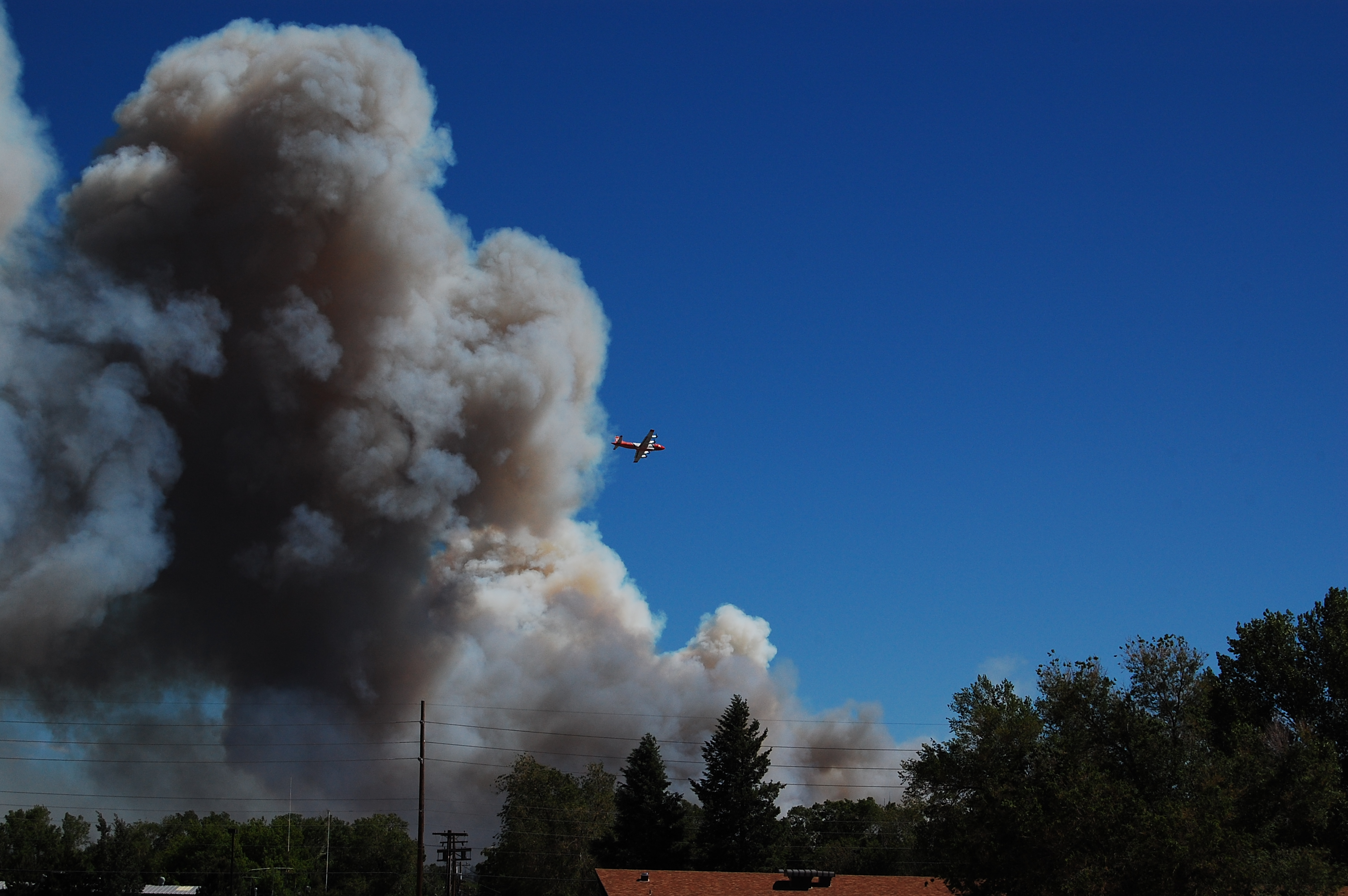
Hardy Wildfire

The Schultz Fire was the area's second fire to start in the same weekend; the 300-acre (120 ha) Hardy Fire southeast of Flagstaff began June 19 and Flagstaff Fire Department ordered some evacuations which became unnecessary once the fire became 30 percent contained. This fire was 90 percent contained by June 25, as was the 3,400-acre (14 km^{2}) Eagle Rock Fire west of Flagstaff, started June 11 by lightning.
