= Tiger Fire =

2021 wildfire in Arizona, USA

- Part of the 2021 Arizona wildfires
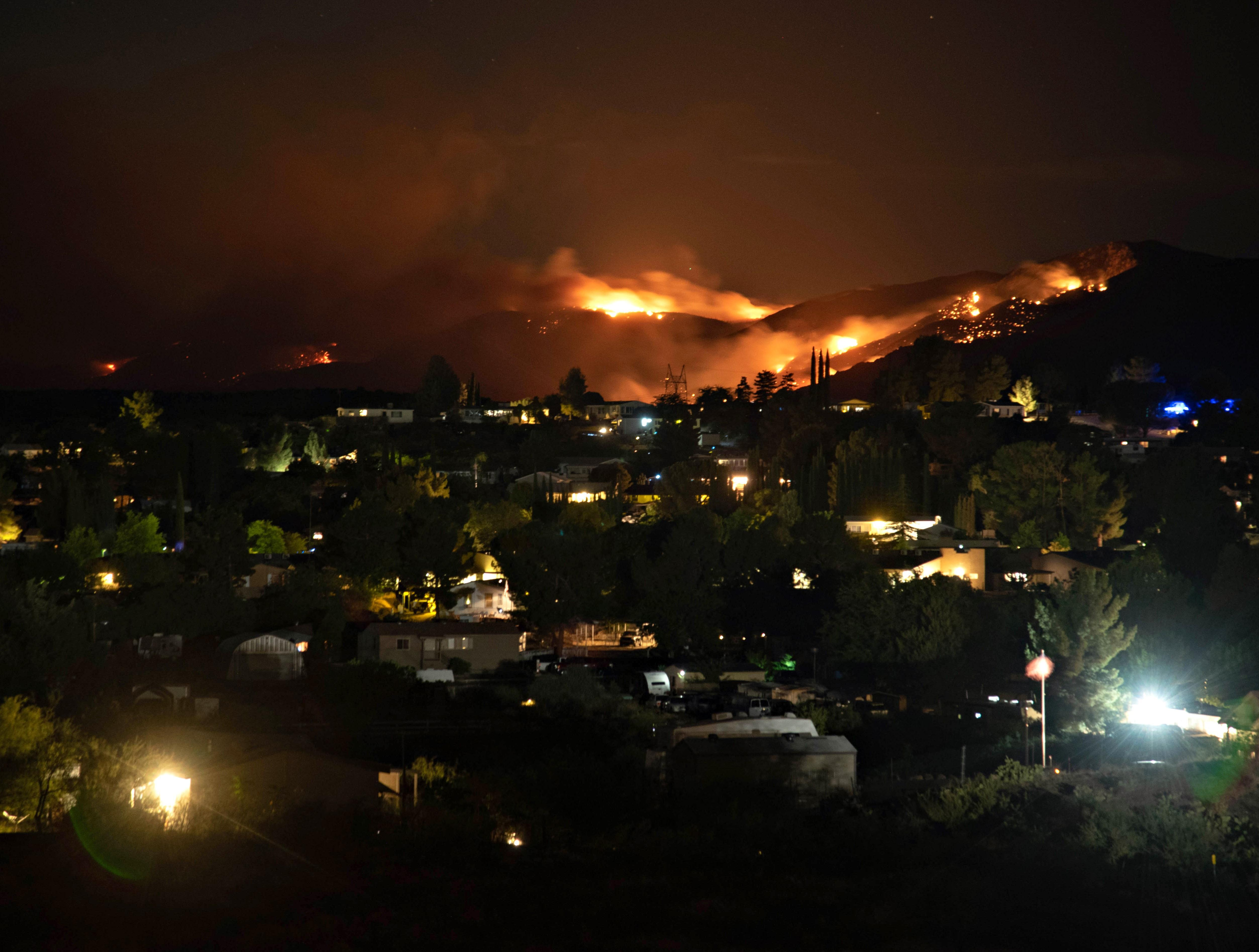
- Flames and plumes of smoke from the Tiger Fire seen from Spring Valley overnight on July 6, 2021
- Date: June 30, 2021 – July 30, 2021
- Location: Yavapai County, Arizona, U.S.
- Coordinates: 34.139°N 112.218°W

Statistics
- Burned area: 16,278 acres (6,587 ha)

Impacts
- Cost: $5.6 million (2021 USD)

Ignition
- Cause: Dry lightning

Map
- Location of the fire in Arizona

The Tiger Fire was a wildfire that burned 16,278 acres (6,587 ha) in the U.S. state of Arizona from June to July 2021. The fire was caused by a dry lightning strike in the Prescott National Forest. Although Horsethief Basin Lake was evacuated and both the community of Crown King and the census-designated place of Black Canyon City were threatened, no injuries or deaths were reported, and no buildings were damaged or destroyed. Over 300 fire personnel were assigned to contain the blaze.

== Events ==
=== Cause ===
The fire began at around 2 pm (MDT) on June 30, 2021, in the Castle Creek Wilderness in the Prescott National Forest. The fire was caused by dry lightning from passing thunderstorms.

=== Wildfire ===
One day after the fire ignited, on July 1, the fire had burned 1,700 acres (690 ha) of land and was burning in steep, rugged terrain 11 miles (18 km) east of Crown King. Heavy smoke from the fire was visible along Interstate 17 near Sunset Point, Arizona. By the end of the following day, the fire had already burned 5,567 acres (2,253 ha) and was burning 3 miles (4.8 km) northwest of Black Canyon City, where a 2015 wildfire had scorched 4,900 acres (2,000 ha). At this point, approximately 63 fire personnel were working to control the blaze, using equipment including two helicopters.

By 8:30 am on July 4, the completely-uncontained blaze had burned 9,800 acres (4,000 ha). A total of 159 personnel were working on easing the fire to keep it under control. Throughout the day, aerial firefighting was effective on the southern and eastern perimeters. An evacuation order was issued for Horsethief Basin Lake due to winds pushing the fire towards the reservoir, while Crown King was put on high alert. On the same day, scattered rain showers slowed the expansion of the fire and reduced its activity. The greatest concentration—approximately 2.65 in (67 mm) of rain—landed towards the south of the fire.

By July 7, the fire had burned 12,133 acres (4,910 ha) due to high temperatures and low humidity caused by a high-pressure system hovering over Arizona on July 6. A total of 323 personnel were working on containing the fire. On July 15, with a burned area of more than 16,000 acres (6,500 ha), the fire reached 59% containment; all evacuation orders were lifted, and although there was no threat of the fire spreading any further, firefighters continued to monitor containment lines throughout the day. The Tiger Fire was fully contained on July 30 after burning a total area of 16,278 acres (6,587 ha).

=== Aftermath ===
The Tiger Fire burned 16,278 acres (6,587 ha) of dry grass and brush, with over 300 fire personnel responding to the blaze. The fire cost $5,644,000 (2021 USD) to suppress. A shelter was opened at New River Elementary School near Black Canyon Highway for evacuees affected by the blaze. No buildings were destroyed, and no injuries or deaths were reported for the duration of the fire.

== Gallery ==
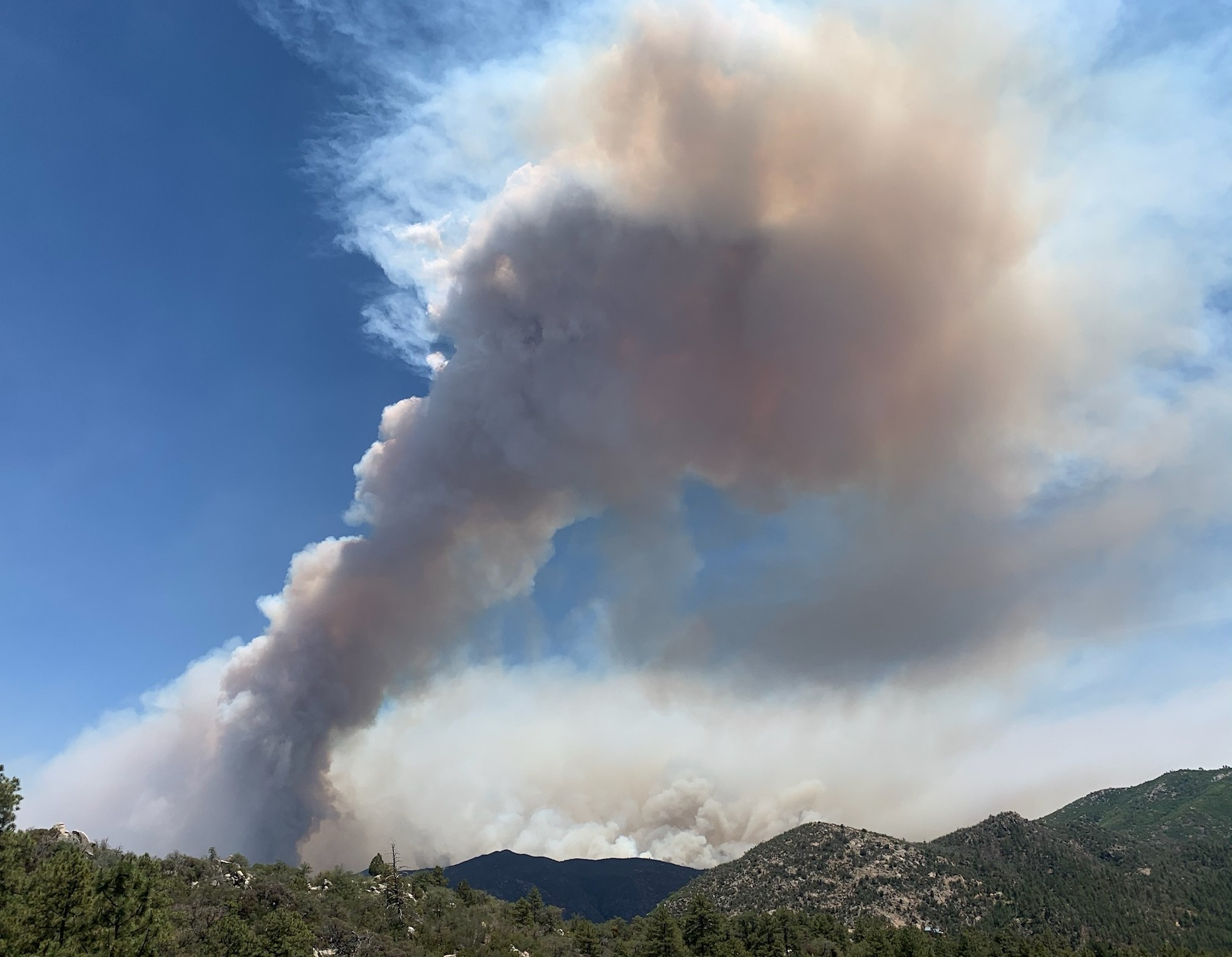
Smoke from the Tiger Fire seen from Crown King on July 7

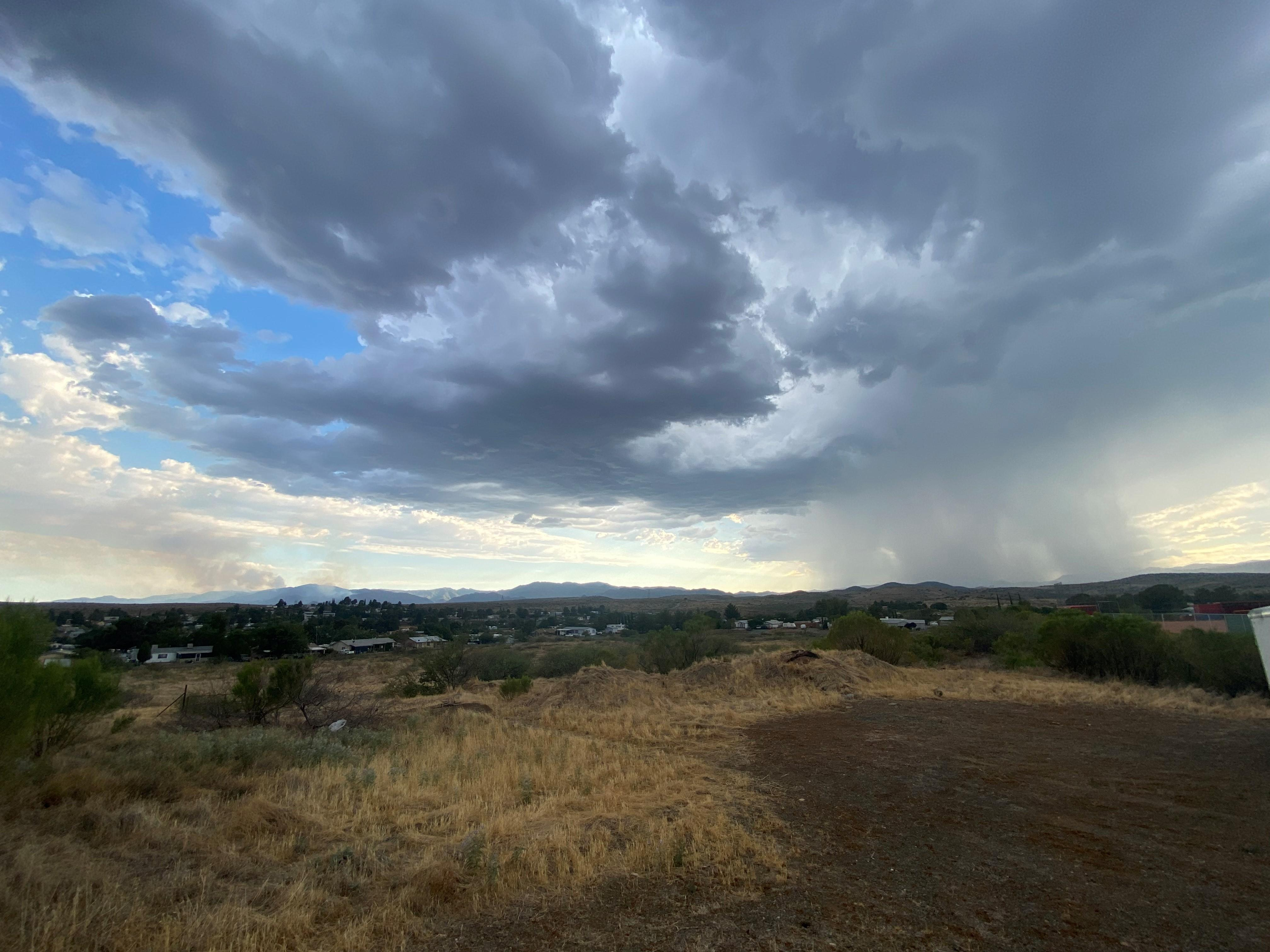
A seasonal monsoon storm approaching the fire on July 9

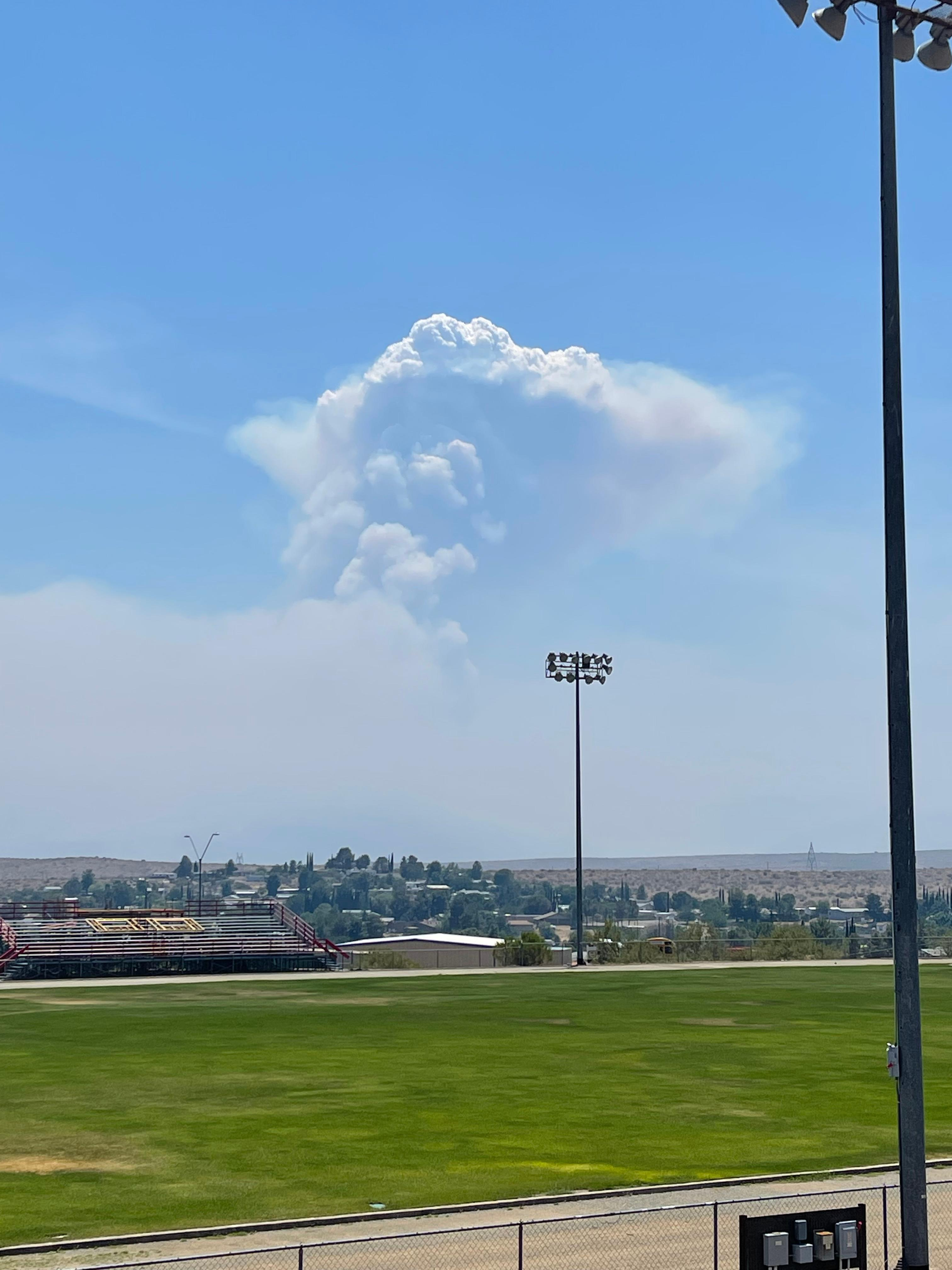
The fire producing a pyrocumulus cloud while burning in the Bradshaw Mountains

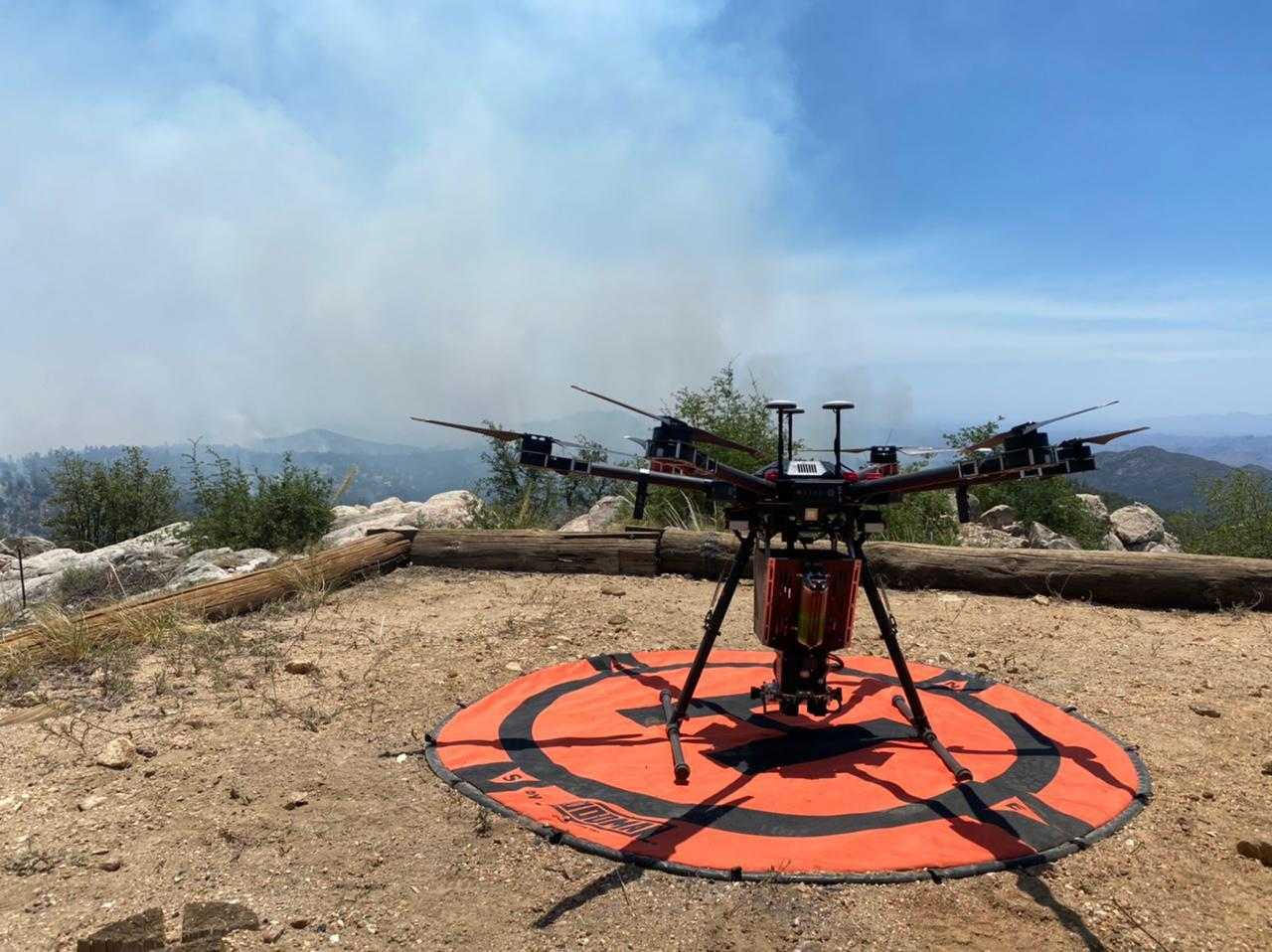
An unmanned aerial vehicle (UAV) ready to conduct aerial ignitions to control the fire

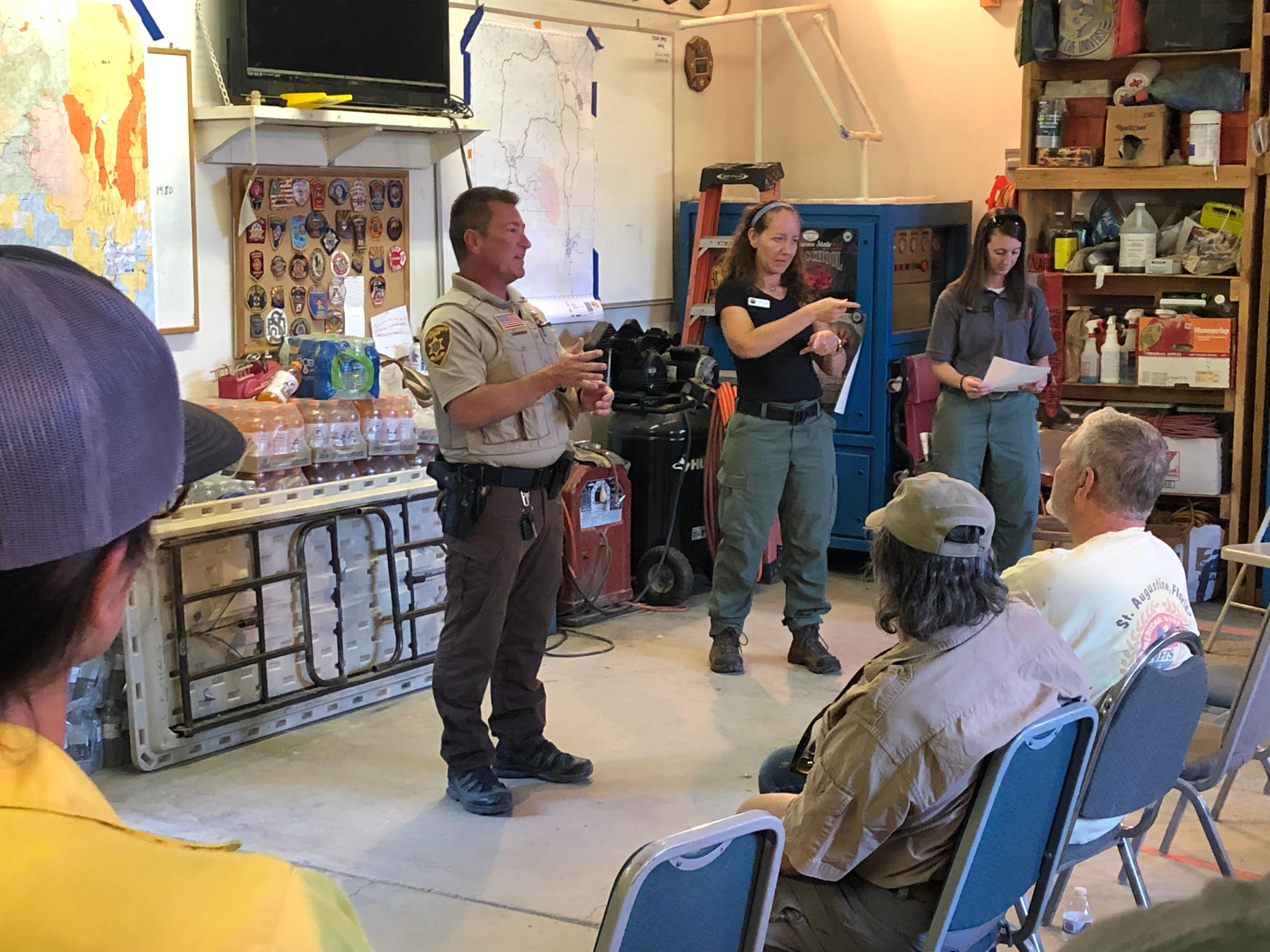
The Yavapai County Sheriff's Office at a public meeting in Crown King giving updates on the Tiger Fire
