= Bradshaw Mountain Railroad =

Former mining railroad in Arizona, US

Overview
- Headquarters: Prescott, Arizona
- Locale: Central Arizona
- Dates of operation: 1901–1912

Technical
- Track gauge: 4 ft 8 1/2 in (1,435 mm) standard gauge

The Bradshaw Mountain Railroad was a subsidiary of the Santa Fe, Prescott and Phoenix Railway (SFP&P) in Arizona. The 35.65-mile (57.37 km) railroad was built to serve the mines in the Bradshaw Mountains. The railroad built from a connection at Poland Junction and at Mayer with the Prescott and Eastern Railroad. The Prescott and Eastern was also operated by the SFP&P.

== History ==
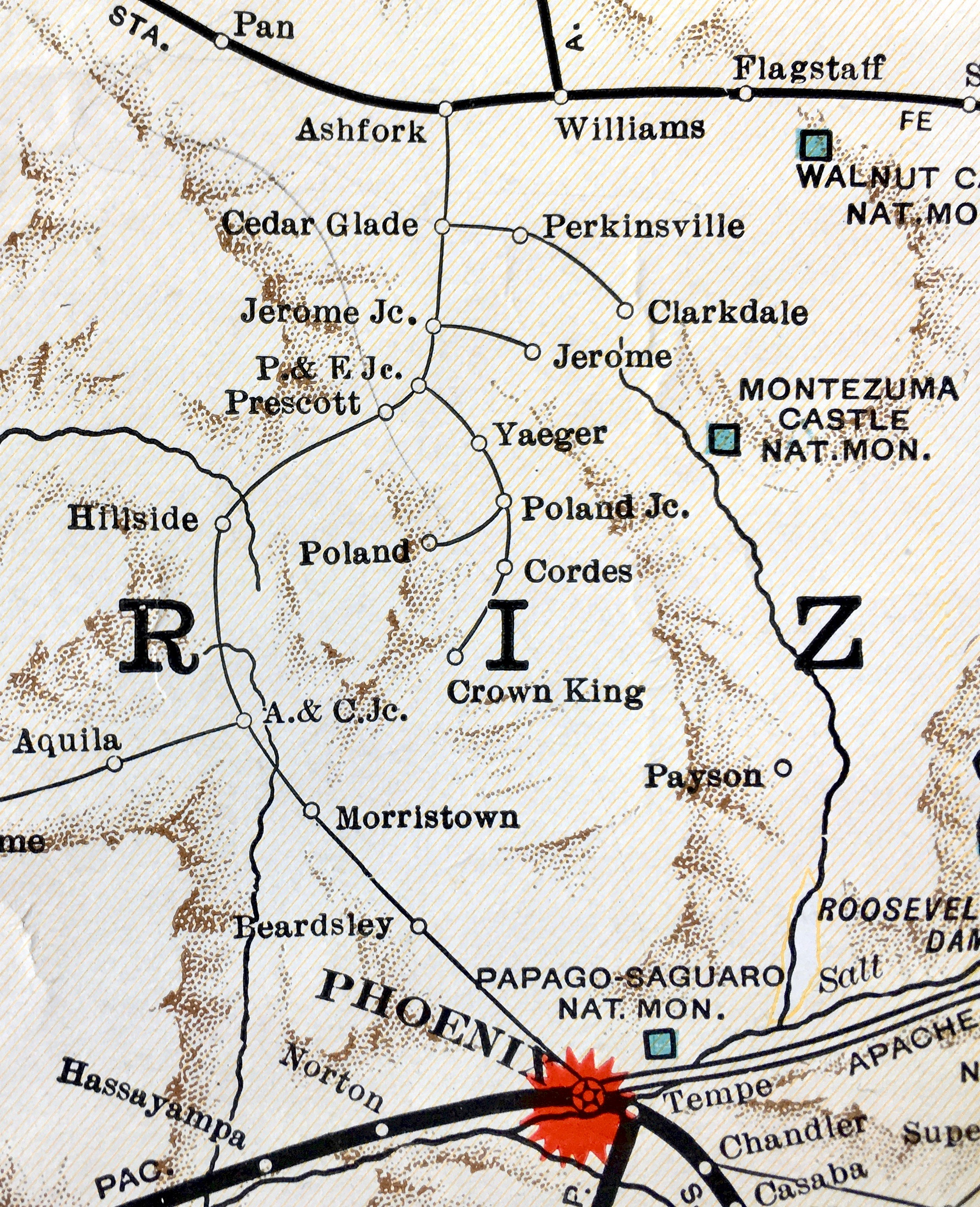
Crown King Branch route in 1930

The railroad was incorporated on February 6, 1901. It commenced grading from the Prescott and Eastern connection at Mayer on September 10, 1901. The line reached Turkey Creek on November 30, 1902, and the following year it reached Saddle. Just prior to the line being completed to Crown King, on January 1, 1904, the Bradshaw Mountain was leased to the SFP&P. On May 4, 1904, the Crown King Branch was completed to Crown King.

The railroad also constructed a branch to Poland from a connection with the Prescott and Eastern at Poland Junction. The Poland Branch was completed on December 17, 1905.

The railroad was operated by the SFP&P by two Brooks 2-8-0 and [4-4-0] locomotives SFP&P #51 and #56 (later ATSF #2439 and #2444) until 1912. On January 2, 1912, the Bradshaw Mountain Railroad was merged into the California, Arizona and Santa Fe Railway. The California, Arizona and Santa Fe Railway did not operate the line as it only existed on paper as a subsidiary of the Atchison, Topeka and Santa Fe Railway.

The Bradshaw Mountain Railroad was built to serve the mines of the southern Bradshaw Mountains. Unfortunately, these mines were never very productive, and the BMRR was a financial failure. The line from Middleton to Crown King was abandoned in 1926, and both the Crown King and Poland branches were abandoned in 1939. Much of the road to Crown King uses the old railbed.

=== Operating railroads ===
- 1901–1912 by the Santa Fe, Prescott and Phoenix Railway
- 1912– by the Atchison, Topeka and Santa Fe Railway

== Route ==
The line was eventually abandoned by the ATSF.

- Mayer
- Blue Bell
- Cordes
- Middleton
  - Tunnel
- Crown King

Poland Branch

- Poland Junction
- Henrietta
  - Tunnel
- Poland (the track was later extended to Walker)

== See also ==
- List of defunct Arizona railroads
