= Dewey–Humboldt, Arizona =

Town in Yavapai County, Arizona

- Town
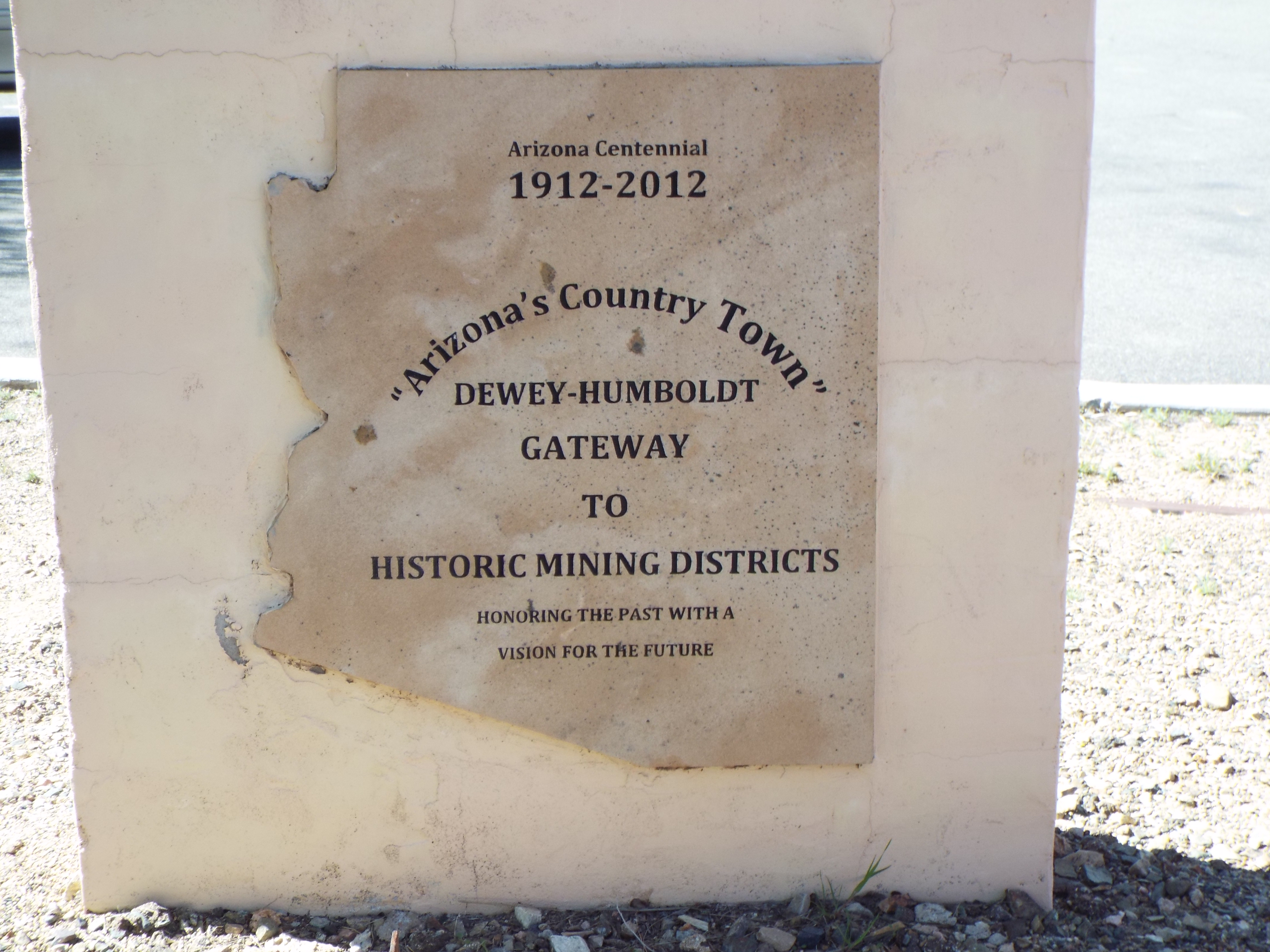
- Town of Dewey-Humboldt historic marker

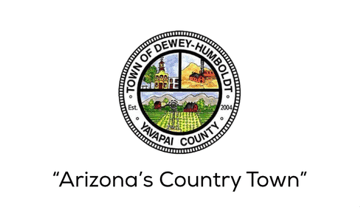
- Flag

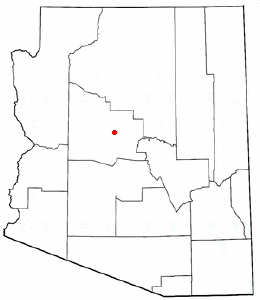
- Location of Dewey–Humboldt in Yavapai County, Arizona
- Coordinates: 34°31′57″N 112°15′9″W
- Country: United States
- State: Arizona
- County: Yavapai
- Incorporated (town): 2004

Government
  - Mayor: Matthew Fenn

Area
  - Total: 18.80 sq mi (48.68 km^{2})
  - Land: 18.80 sq mi (48.68 km^{2})
  - Water: 0 sq mi (0.00 km^{2})
- Elevation: 4,580 ft (1,396 m)

Population (2020)
  - Total: 4,326
  - Density: 230.2/sq mi (88.87/km^{2})
- Time zone: UTC-7 (MST)
- ZIP code: 86329
- Area code: 928
- FIPS code: 04-19145
- GNIS feature ID: 2412424
- Website: www.dhaz.gov

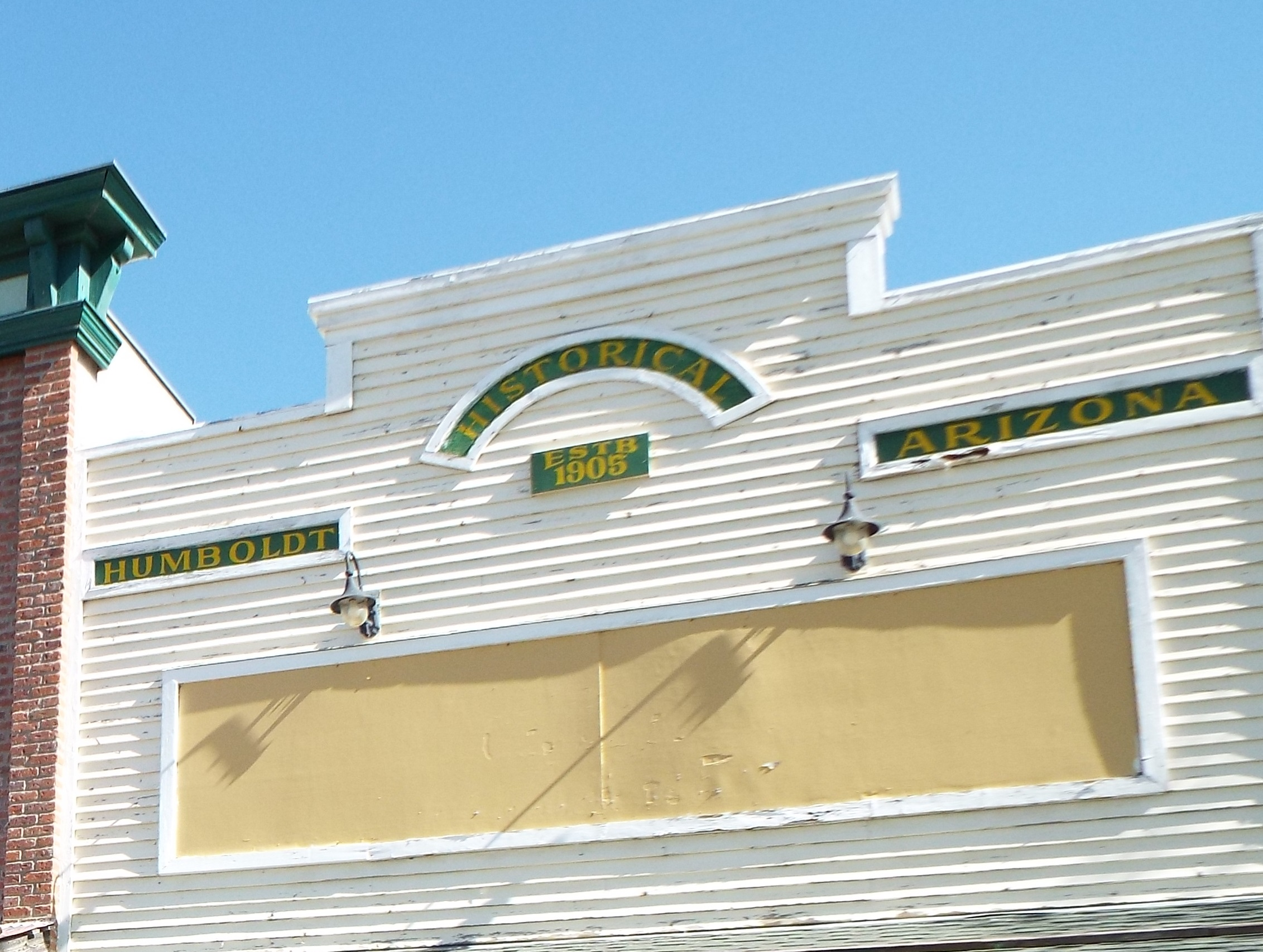
Building in the Dewey Original Town site

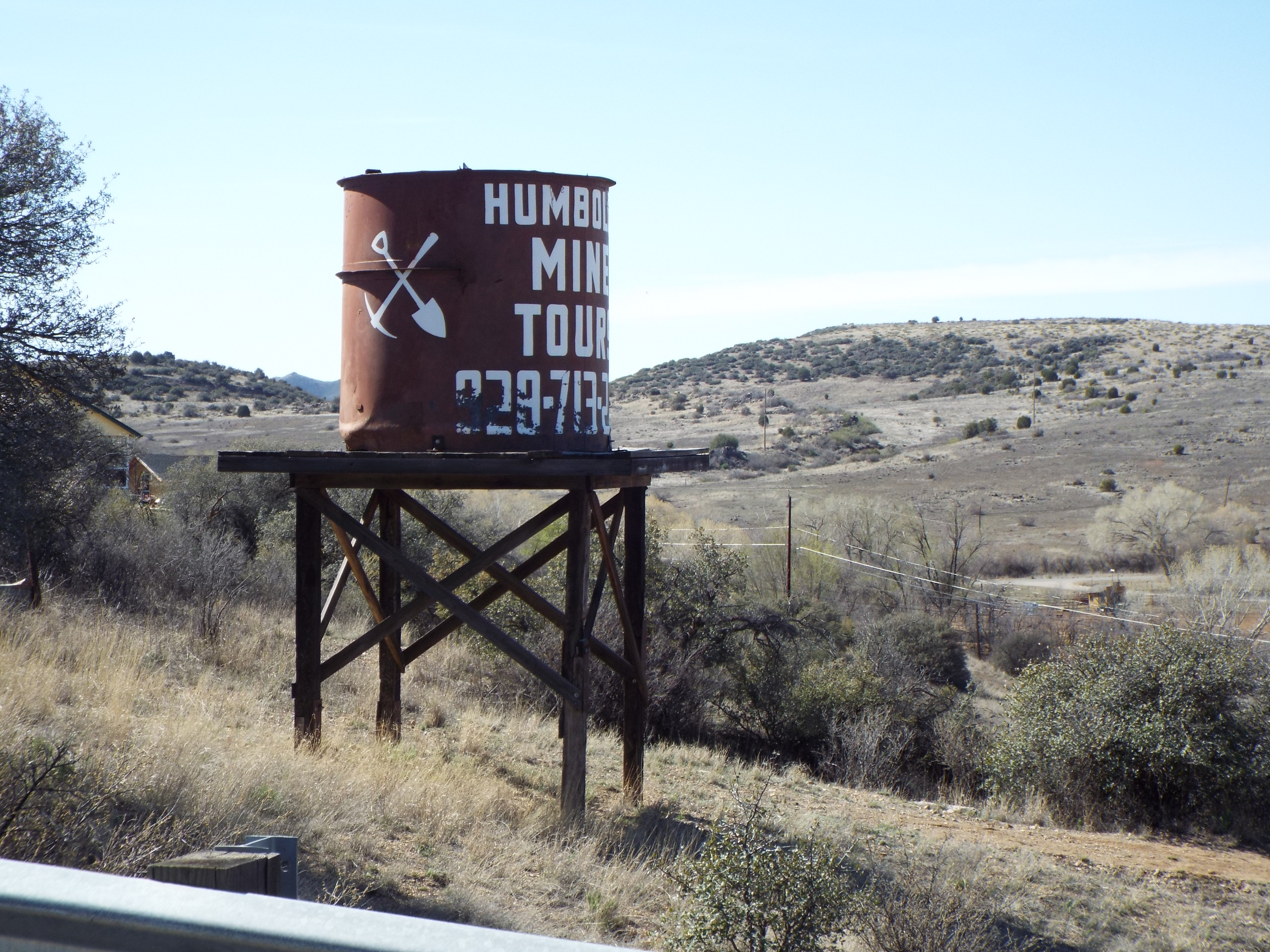
1906 Iron King Mine Water Tower

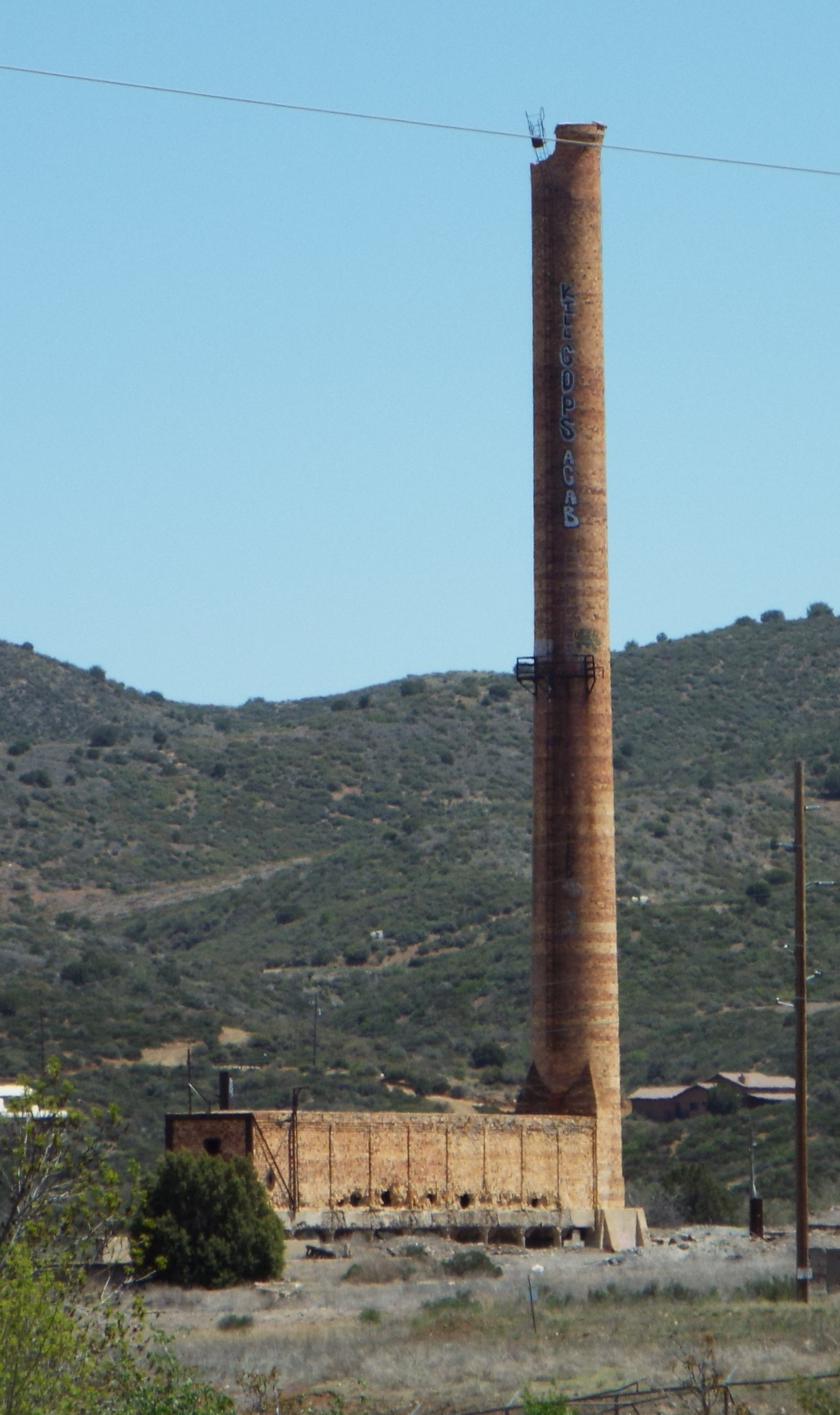
The 1906 Iron King Mine smelter

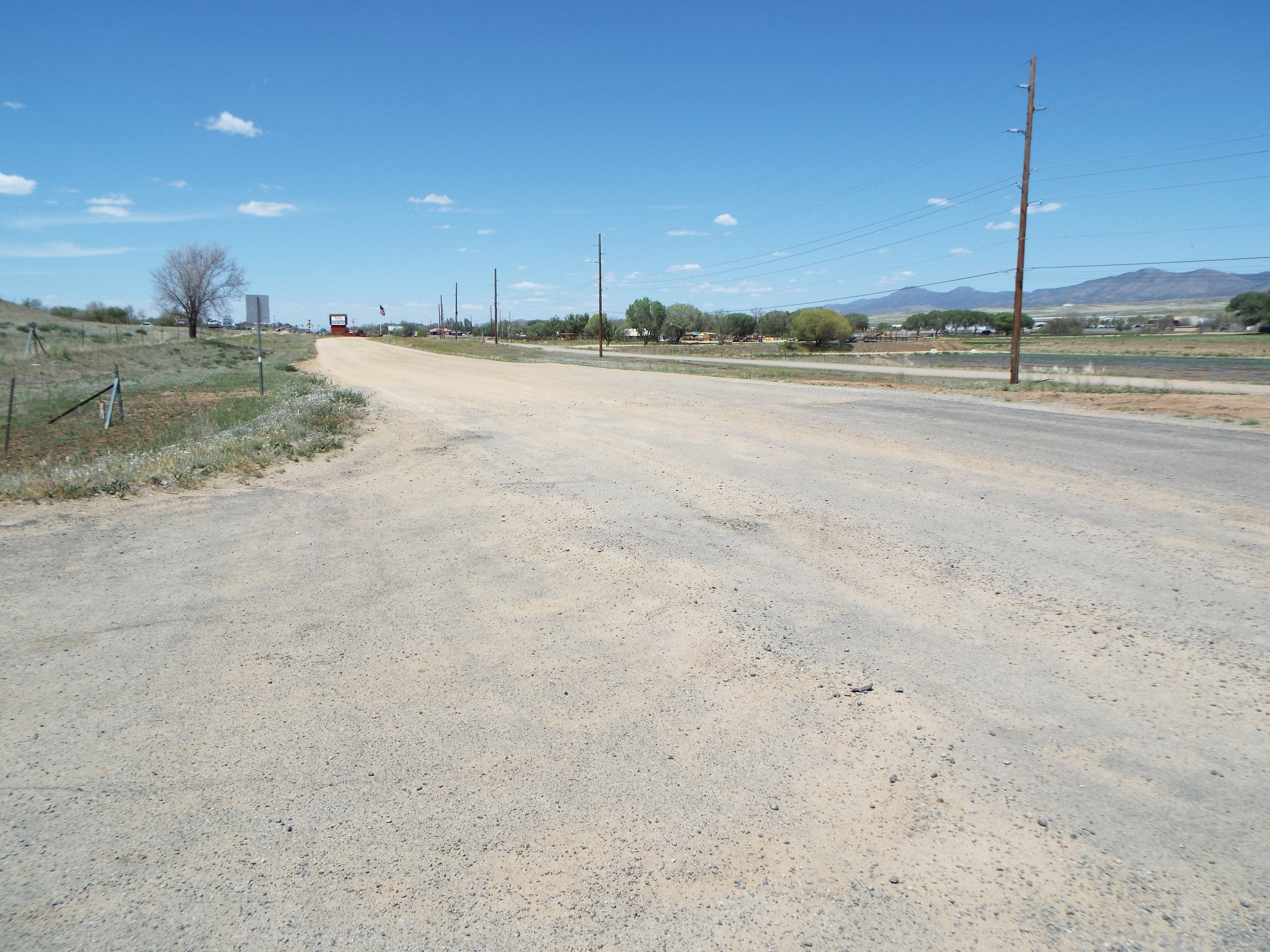
Historic Old Black Canyon Hwy

Dewey–Humboldt is a town in Yavapai County, Arizona, United States. The population of the town was 3,894 according to the 2010 census. The Dewey–Humboldt area was a census-designated place (CDP) at the 2000 census, at which time its population was 3,453.

== Brief history ==
Dewey–Humboldt was incorporated on December 20, 2004, from the existing unincorporated towns of Dewey and Humboldt, located adjacent to one another in the Agua Fria River Valley, 15 miles east of Prescott.

After discovery of gold on Lynx Creek in the spring of 1863, the Dewey area was settled around the summer 1863 by pioneer prospector, rancher and politician King Woolsey (1832–1879), who founded the Agua Fria Ranch, in what was then known as "Woolsey Valley," to supply the miners. Woolsey used stones from decimating prehistoric ruin to build his ranch house, built an irrigation system off the Agua Fria (probably part of a prehistoric system), and introduced some of the first cattle into newly organized Yavapai County (1864). At the "falls" of the Agua Fria at present Humboldt, Woolsey built a small quartz mill to work gold ores from the nearby hills and a small water-powered grist mill. During 1864, he led the storied Woolsey Expeditions to the east in retaliatory raids on Apache and in search of gold; all failed to find a new Eldorado. All these activities caused his bankruptcy, and sale of the ranch property to the Bowers Brothers, sutlers at Fort Whipple. The brothers continued to use the house and farm the lands to supply the region with corn, barley, and other agricultural products. (The ruins of Woolsey's ranch house can still be seen between the old Black Canyon Highway and the Agua Fria River about one mile north of Humboldt. The property is listed on the National Register of Historic Places.)

As the valley began to fill up with a few ranches and farms, a post office was established in 1875. The stage station (Prescott to Phoenix wagon road via Black Canyon) and post office nearby was named "Agua Fria." By the early 1870s water diversions were being used to irrigate an extensive area of corn and other crops. In the mid-1870s a small water-powered, silver-lead furnace, "Agua Fria Furnace," was built to work the ores from what would become the Iron King mine area. The small plant, built at the site of Woolsey's earlier mill at today's Humboldt, proved the value of the region, but was too isolated to make a profit.

The isolation of the region came to an end in 1898. The Prescott & Eastern Railroad was built from near Prescott to Mayer (later it was extended all the way to Crown King). The P & E followed along the Agua Fria and built sidings at Cherry Creek Siding (Dewey Post Office), and Val Verde, the site of a smelter built by the Val Verde Smelting Company—a large plant at the site of Humboldt. The Agua Fria post office closed in 1895. When a new post office opened in 1898, the community was renamed Dewey, probably to honor Admiral Dewey's great victory that year at the Battle of Manila—this was the height of the Spanish–American War. Another post office was established at Val Verde (Humboldt) in 1899.

In 1902 the Val Verde smelter burnt to the ground. A new company was formed, the Consolidated Arizona Smelting Company, which built a giant smelting plant upon the ashes of the Val Verde works. This operation served not only local mines, but operations throughout the then Arizona Territory. The Val Verde post office was renamed Humboldt in 1905 to honor Baron Alexander von Humboldt, who had visited New Spain early in the 19th century and predicted that greater riches would be found to the north (interpreted by early twentieth century promoters as the Bradshaw Mountains region). Around this time the town of Humboldt began to develop. The smelter and the railroads into the Bradshaws created probably the most widespread mining boom in the county. By 1907 the population had reached 1,000. With two daily trains, business in the town boomed and the city decided to showcase their development by hosting a Labor Day celebration that year. The celebration featuring a parade on Main Street became an annual tradition, now organized by the Agua Fria Chamber of Commerce and held on the last Saturday in September.

The Humboldt smelter operation went through a half decade of reorganization after the Panic of 1907 deflated the local mining boom. Revival came during the high mineral market prices of the World War I era, when the smelting plant operated in conjunction with the Blue Bell Mine, the one productive copper mine in the Bradshaw Mountains. The train connected the mine, located south of Mayer, with the smelter, which kept the town prosperous. Many of Humboldt's historic buildings date from the early twentieth century period.

One of the early important mines was the nearby Iron King Mine, but its over promotion in the early 1900s, with the panic of 1907, caused it to close temporarily. It was reopened during the high mineral market prices of World War I. After World War I, a post-war economic down turn caused the smelter and mine to close again. Revival came by the mid-1920s and the local farm and mine economy prospered until the Wall Street crash of 1929 hit. Mines and the smelter closed, and by 1930 the population of Humboldt had dwindled to 300. Humboldt had a second but smaller boom in 1934 when the mine reopened, but its duration of operation would be longer under the Shattuck-Denn company of Bisbee, Arizona fame. The Iron King became the most productive mine in the Bradshaws, and produced $100 million in gold, silver, lead and zinc before its closure in 1968.

The mine tailings are presently being reprocessed into iron-rich Ironite fertilizer. There have been questions raised about the lead and arsenic content of the fertilizer, but the company maintains its product is harmless. "The lead and arsenic are in forms that cannot escape into the environment. You can eat them and they'll pass right through you," said Rob Morgan, Ironite's executive vice president and chief operating officer. "They're not harmful." However, the United States Environmental Protection Agency has recently posted a cautionary statement, warning that potentially harmful amounts of arsenic could be released from use of Ironite. Ironite is banned in Canada.

The railroad track, the old Prescott & Eastern line which long before had been taken over by the Santa Fe, was removed in 1971. Today in Humboldt, a lone smelter smokestack, a significant reminder of the region's mining history and pioneers' legacy, remains overlooking the historic buildings on Main Street.

Farming continued in a small portion of the area until 2006 when the last working farm was sold to developers. Today Dewey is a low-density residential area.

== Geography ==
According to the United States Census Bureau, the CDP had a total area of 18.6 square miles (48 km^{2}), all of it land.

=== Climate ===
Climate data for Dewey-Humboldt, AZ, normals
Month	Jan	Feb	Mar	Apr	May	Jun	Jul	Aug	Sep	Oct	Nov	Dec	Year
Mean daily maximum °F (°C)	51.6 (10.9)	55.0 (12.8)	61.0 (16.1)	68.9 (20.5)	78.1 (25.6)	87.7 (30.9)	90.8 (32.7)	88.2 (31.2)	82.6 (28.1)	72.3 (22.4)	60.0 (15.6)	50.9 (10.5)	70.6 (21.4)
Mean daily minimum °F (°C)	28.5 (−1.9)	30.6 (−0.8)	34.9 (1.6)	40.8 (4.9)	49.5 (9.7)	57.8 (14.3)	64.0 (17.8)	62.8 (17.1)	56.1 (13.4)	44.8 (7.1)	34.2 (1.2)	27.8 (−2.3)	44.3 (6.8)
Average precipitation inches (mm)	1.4 (36)	1.6 (41)	1.5 (38)	0.7 (18)	0.5 (13)	0.4 (10)	2.1 (53)	2.7 (69)	1.6 (41)	1.1 (28)	1.1 (28)	1.2 (30)	15.9 (405)
Source: Bestplaces.net

== Demographics ==
Historical population
Census	Pop.	Note	%±
1990	3,640		—
2000	3,453		−5.1%
2010	3,894		12.8%
2020	4,326		11.1%
U.S. Decennial Census

As of the census of 2000, there were 6,295 people, 2,795 households, and 2,023 families residing in the CDP. The population density was 274.8 inhabitants per square mile (106.1/km^{2}). There were 3,358 housing units at an average density of 146.6 per square mile (56.6/km^{2}). The racial makeup of the CDP was 96.4% White, 0.2% Black or African American, 0.6% Native American, 0.3% Asian, 0.0% Pacific Islander, 1.5% from other races, and 0.9% from two or more races. 5.2% of the population were Hispanic or Latino of any race.

There were 2,795 households, out of which 16.8% had children under the age of 18 living with them, 63.8% were married couples living together, 5.3% had a female householder with no husband present, and 27.6% were non-families. 23.0% of all households were made up of individuals, and 13.9% had someone living alone who was 65 years of age or older. The average household size was 2.25 and the average family size was 2.59.

In the CDP, the population was spread out, with 16.8% under the age of 18, 4.0% from 18 to 24, 16.3% from 25 to 44, 31.4% from 45 to 64, and 31.4% who were 65 years of age or older. The median age was 54 years. For every 100 females, there were 96.1 males. For every 100 females age 18 and over, there were 93.9 males.

The median income for a household in the CDP was $36,839, and the median income for a family was $41,232. Males had a median income of $35,446 versus $22,484 for females. The per capita income for the CDP was $20,326. About 4.8% of families and 8.7% of the population were below the poverty line, including 14.9% of those under age 18 and 6.2% of those age 65 or over.

== Education ==
It is in the Humboldt Unified School District.

== Landmarks ==
King S. Woolsey was a notable American pioneer rancher, Indian-fighter, prospector and politician who had a ranch located right off the Old Black Canyon Highway in what is now the town of Dewey-Humboldt.

Eventually, the land in which his ranch was located was sold and in 1946, became Young's Farm, a family-owned farm selling turkeys and pumpkins. Hay rides, pumpkin patches, and a country restaurant made it a popular attraction for city dwellers seeking a taste of farm life. Youngs Farm held a "Pumpkin Fest" every October, drawing large numbers of tourists from other parts of Arizona. After preservation attempts failed, Young's Farm was sold to developers, and closed in late 2006. As of mid-2010, the site remains undeveloped, however as of April 2011, Mortimer Family Farms purchased the Young's farm and continued to sell sweet corn in the summer and pumpkins in the fall to the public. The ruins of Woolsey's ranch are still standing and can be seen from the Old Black Canyon Highway.
