= Cleator, Arizona =

Ghost town in Yavapai County, Arizona

- Ghost town
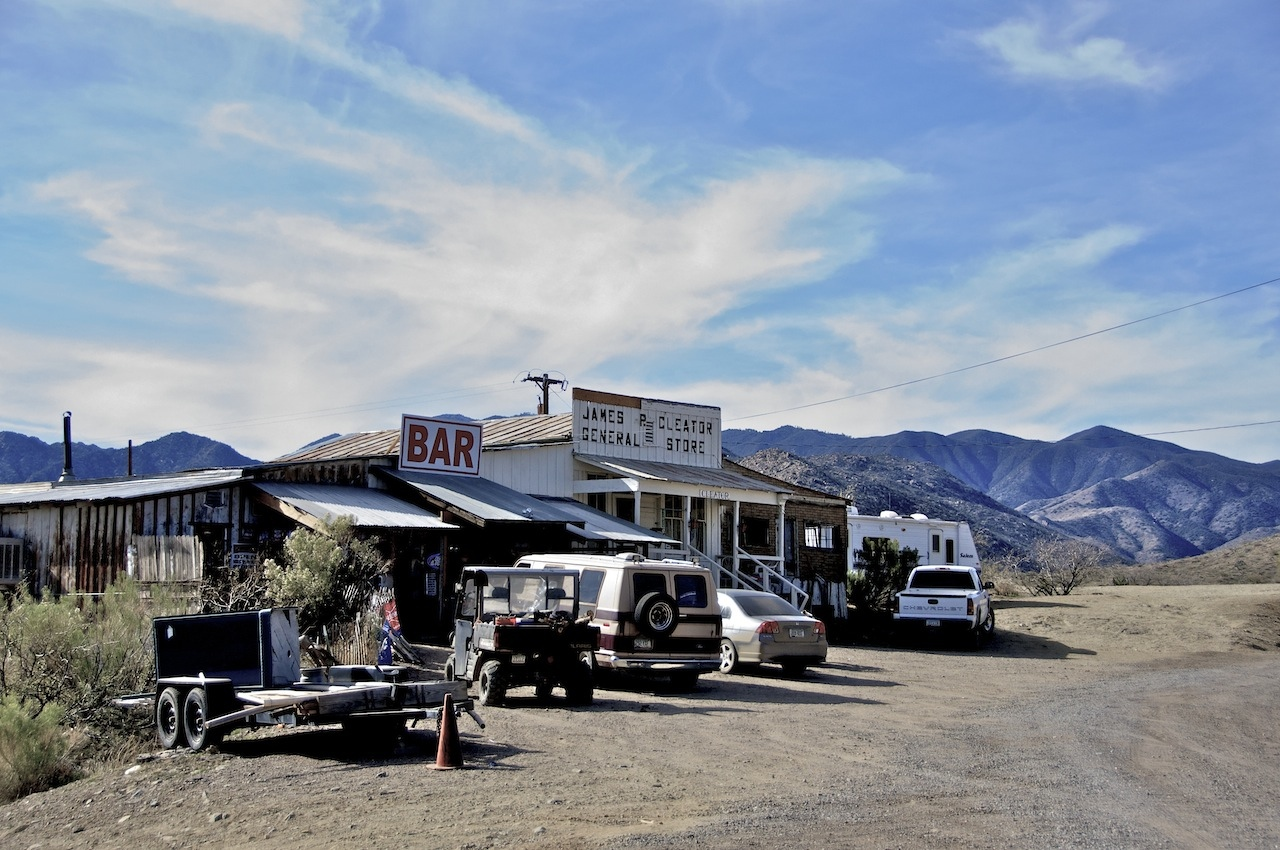
- Cleator in 2012

- Location within the state of Arizona Cleator, Arizona (the United States)
- Country: United States
- State: Arizona
- County: Yavapai
- Elevation: 3,501 ft (1,067 m)
- Time zone: UTC-7 (MST (no DST))
- GNIS feature ID: 27704

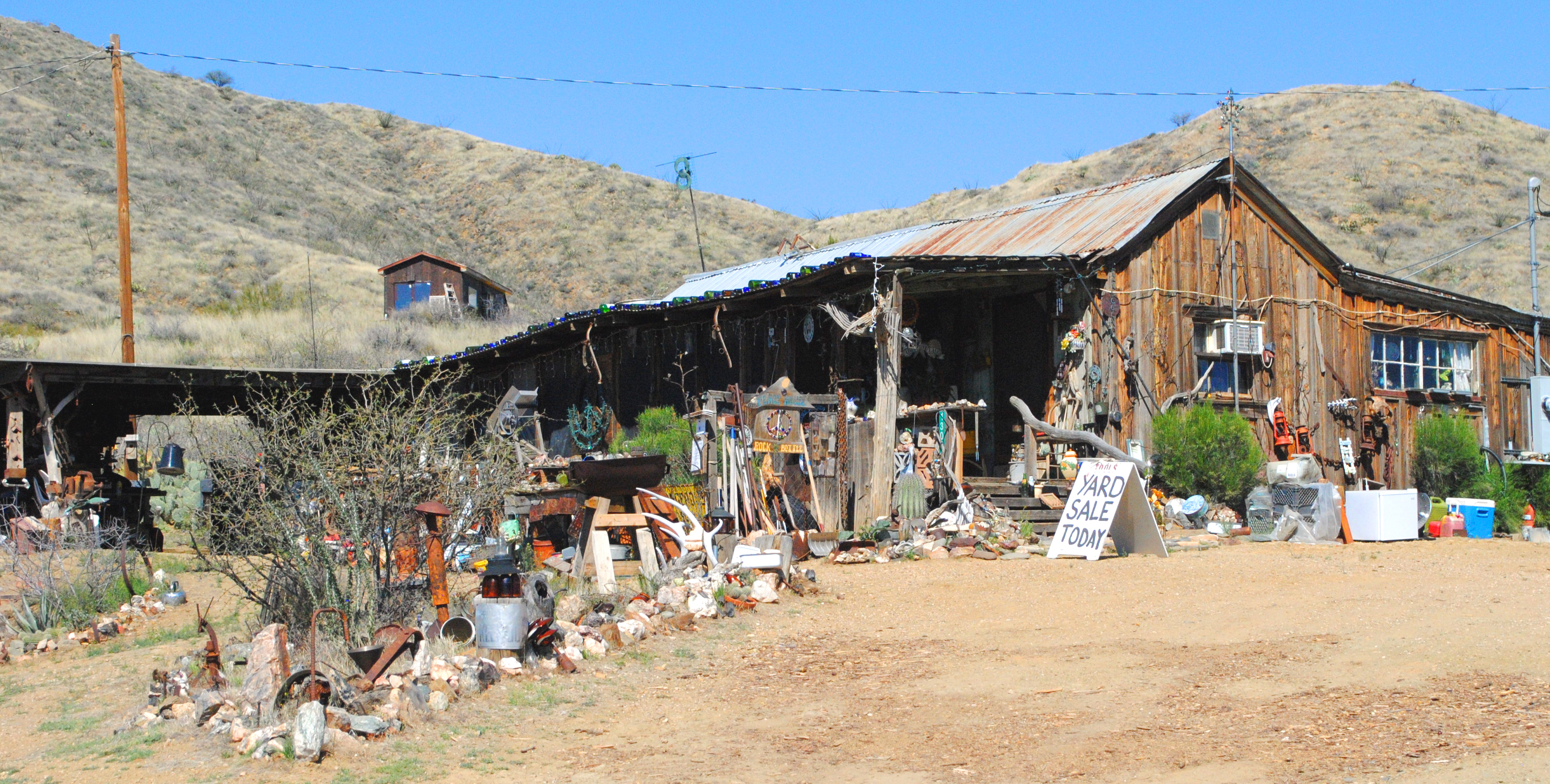
Yard Sale in Cleator, 2015

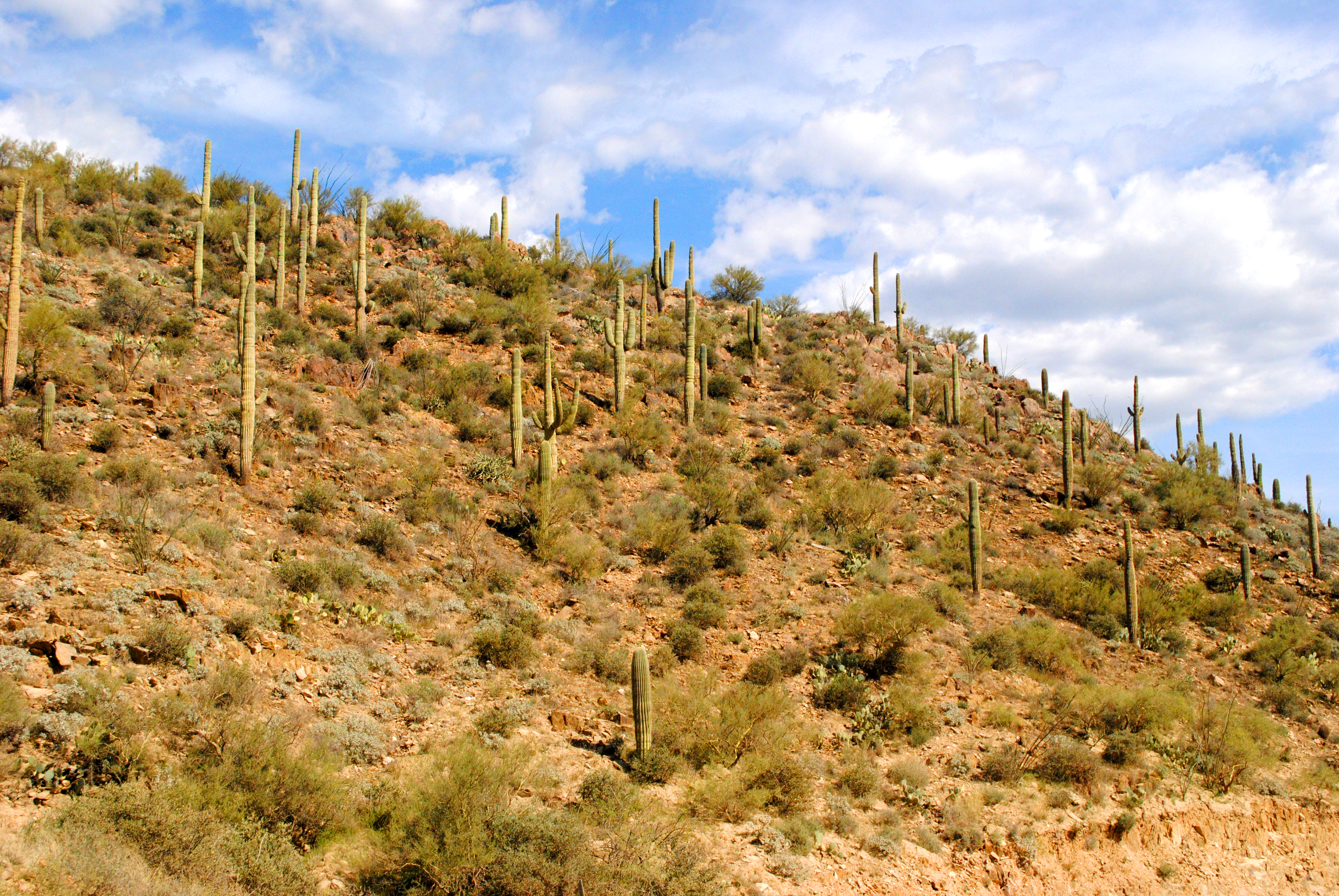
Saguaros above the Crown King road, about 1.5 miles west of Cleator

Cleator (/ˈkliːtər/), formerly Turkey Creek or Turkey, is a near ghost town and small community in Yavapai County, Arizona, in the Southwestern United States.

== History ==
Cleator was established two miles from the Turkey creek in 1864 as a placer gold mining site under the name Turkey Creek Mining District after gold was found. A post office was established at Turkey Creek in July 1869 but closed within a few months. After gold ore was depleted by the end of the 19th century, mines were opened in the area. A railroad station had been established at the site, in the Bradshaw Mountains, along the Prescott and Eastern Railroad; in 1902 Murphy's Impossible Railroad (between the communities Cordes and Crown King) reached the town. Lev P. Nellis had already opened a town store and other amenities in 1901.

The townsite of Turkey Creek became known as Cleator in 1925 after James P. Cleator, who then owned it after a deal with Nellis, renamed the post office, which had reopened on March 21, 1903, after himself. The post office closed again on July 15, 1954. James Cleator was a Manx who had run away to sea as a boy, arriving in America with Spanish sailors in 1889 and walking his way to gold mines in California before traveling through Mexico to Arizona by 1900. He approached Nellis in 1905 and the pair became business partners, running the town and opening a ranch together; in 1915 they split properties, with James Cleator trading his interest in the ranch and $2500 for Nellis's interest in the town, taking full possession.

Cleator's population fell in the 1920s as mining in the area declined, and the railroad was removed by 1932, before the town was put up for sale by James Cleator in April 1949. At the time it had about 60 residents. Nobody bought it and so, after James Cleator's death in 1959, his son Thomas bought the town and lived there until his own death in 1996. Thomas Cleator kept the small bar open most of the years he lived there. After his death everything was inherited by his sister Eleanor and her son. The bar is still open and is a popular stop along the dusty road for recreational ATV drivers and weekend tourists, with the bar and town managed by Dave Rhodes.

From the 1990s, the townsite mostly operates for tourism, though it had 8 permanent residents in 2020. Original American frontier buildings and an ironic yacht club (there are no water features near the town) serve as attractions. Several original buildings remain and are occupied. In 2020, the descendants of James P. Cleator put the entire town up for sale at the price of $1.25 million. An Arizona Historical Marker exists at the town.

== Geography ==
Cleator is at the base of the Bradshaw Mountains in central Arizona. It has a mild winter warm summer climate. The former railroad is now a 2WD town road. The town comprises 40 acres and sits at 1,067 metres (3,501 ft) above sea level.
