= Lynx Lake (Arizona) =

Lake in Yavapai County, Arizona

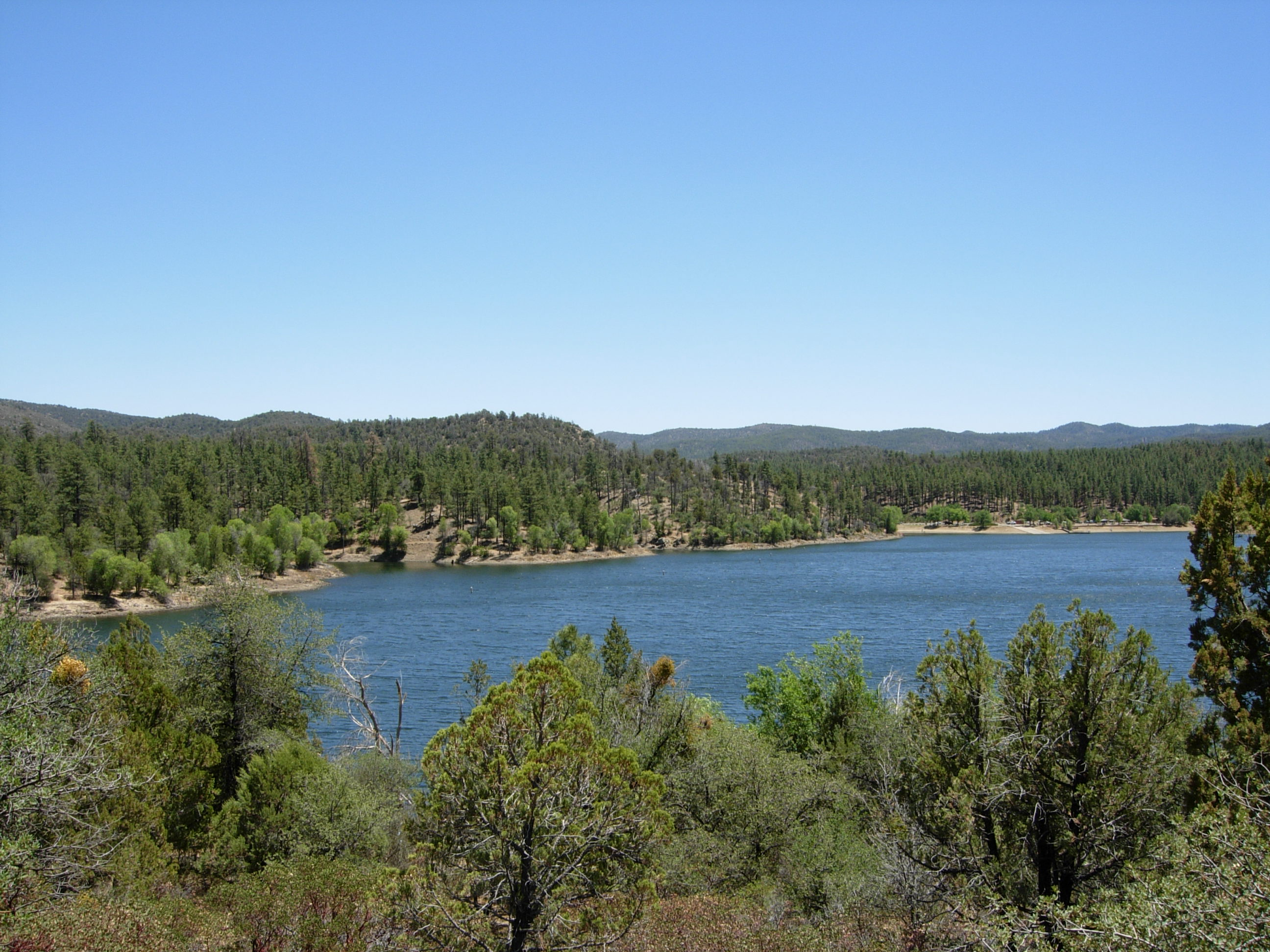

- Location within Arizona Location within the United States
- Location: Prescott National Forest, Yavapai County, Arizona, United States
- Coordinates: 34°30′55″N 112°23′2″W
- Type: reservoir
- Primary inflows: Lynx Creek
- Basin countries: United States
- Surface area: 55 acres (22 ha)
- Average depth: 40 ft (12 m)
- Surface elevation: 5,530 ft (1,690 m)

Lynx Lake, Arizona, is a 55-acre (220,000 m^{2}) reservoir located within Prescott National Forest, approximately 5 miles (8.0 km) east of Prescott, Arizona, in the Bradshaw Mountains. The lake is located at 5,530 feet (1,690 m) elevation and is stocked for fishing. It is one of the most popular recreation areas in central Arizona. Mild weather, the cool ponderosa pine forest, trout fishing, boating, mountain hiking, horseback riding, archaeological sites, and bird watching attract visitors from throughout Arizona. The lake was formed in 1963 when Arizona Game and Fish completed a dam in Lynx Creek, 6 miles (9.7 km) below Walker, Arizona.

== Ecology ==
Animals native to the area include mule deer, bald eagles, osprey, and javelinas. Several species have been introduced, including rainbow trout, bull frogs, and domestic ducks and geese. Arizona State Game and Fish Department periodically stocks the lake with rainbow trout. Largemouth bass and crappie are also present in the lake. The lake is open all year.

Plant life in the area consists of ponderosa pine, beargrass, cliff-rose, and alligator juniper.

== Activities on Lynx Lake ==
- Fishing: The lake is open year-round for fishing and is stocked with rainbow trout periodically by the Arizona Game and Fish Department. Sunfish and Catfish (Channel), as well as bullfrogs, may be caught here.
- Camping: Two National Forest Campgrounds near the lake offer 36 campsites.
- Boating: Non-motorized and electric-powered boats are permitted on the lake.
- Hiking: The 2.5- mile Lakeshore Trail loops around the lake.
- Recreational gold panning

== December 2024 valve failure and draining ==
In December 2024 the Arizona Game and Fish Department announced that the lake would be drained due to a mechanical failure that caused an outlet valve to remain in the open position. There are no expected negative effects to fish and wildlife in the lake.
