= Castle Creek Wilderness =

Protected wilderness area in Arizona, US

- IUCN category Ib (wilderness area)
- Location within the United States
- Location: Yavapai County, Arizona, US
- Nearest town: Crown King, Arizona
- Coordinates: 34°12′10″N 112°31′24″W
- Area: 25,517 acres (103 km^{2})
- Established: 1984
- Governing body: U.S. Forest Service

Castle Creek Wilderness is a protected wilderness area in the Prescott National Forest in the U.S. state of Arizona. Established in 1984, the Wilderness lies within the southern end of the rugged Bradshaw Mountains. Elevations range from 2,800 feet (853 m) to 7,000 feet (2,133 m), allowing for a range of vegetation. Saguaro cactus, palo verde, and mesquite dominate the lower end of the range in the south; as the elevation increases, the vegetation changes to a chaparral community, and further north in the highest elevations, it includes ponderosa pine, Arizona oak, and alligator juniper.

From some of the high points along Juniper Ridge in the northern part of the wilderness, one is able to view the Agua Fria River down below to the east. The area provides for many different species, including mule deer, javelina, mountain lions, bobcats, black bears, coyotes, rabbits, foxes, skunks, and badgers.

== See also ==
- List of Arizona Wilderness Areas
- List of U.S. Wilderness Areas
