= Entro, Arizona =

Location in Yavapai County, Arizona

- Populated place
- Location within the state of Arizona Entro (the United States)
- Coordinates: 34°36′25″N 112°24′15″W
- Country: United States
- State: Arizona
- County: Yavapai
- Elevation: 5,141 ft (1,567 m)
- Time zone: UTC-7 (Mountain (MST))
  - Summer (DST): UTC-7 (MST)
- Area code: 928
- FIPS code: 04-22935
- GNIS feature ID: 28909

Entro, also known as Entro Siding and P and E Junction, was a rail junction in Yavapai County, Arizona, United States. It has an estimated elevation of 5,141 feet (1,567 m) above sea level. It was the point at which the Prescott and Eastern Railroad met the Santa Fe, Prescott and Phoenix Railway, eventually part of the Atchison, Topeka and Santa Fe Railway. In 1917 it had a population of 15. The lines were eventually abandoned.
