= Crown King Elementary School District =

School district in Yavapai County, Arizona

Crown King Elementary School District 41 is a school district in Crown King, a community in Yavapai County, Arizona. It has one school, Crown King Elementary School, a K-8 school. The facility is in a one room schoolhouse.

== History ==
In 1894 the first educational institution of the community was organized. A boarding house was its center of operations. The school began operations in 1906. Initially, Union Hall served as the location of operations. A permanent school facility opened in 1916.

In 1938 the district began leasing property used for the school district from the Philadelphia Mining Company. In January 1976 there were nine students, and the district paid the tuition costs of two other students. That year, a referendum for the district to buy the land housing the school facility and some additional land successfully passed. All 24 voters who participated in the referendum supported the decision. In the 1976–1977 school year there were five students, and there were to be three students for fall 1977. At the time, the board of trustees had three members, and Douglas Melvold of The Arizona Republic noted both student and board trustee numbers were the same.

Enrollment went up to the 20s in the 1980s when a mine began operations again, and as a result two rooms in the school were used for classes. Its peak enrollment in its history was 21, during that decade.

In 1987, there was controversy over the name of the school book club, "666," and members of the board of trustees had religious objections to it. All members resigned their posts at the same time in light of the controversy.

Enrollment declined again in the 1990s. By 1998 the school received around two to three renovations, according to PhD thesis author Vinson E. Greer.

In 2001 one student completed the 8th grade, and four students were to attend the school the next year. In 2005 the school had five students. By then the school had modern internet connections and other technology, and the former second classroom housed the computer equipment. Circa 2019 enrollment varied between one and around twelve students at a time. In the 2018–2019 school year, the school initially had seven students, but one was enrolled at the end of the school year.

== Operations ==
As of 2005 the employees took on multiple roles each, and there were fewer extracurricular programs compared to those of larger schools.

In 1976 Melvold described the education program as "the basics — nothing more".

In 2019 the school's only student took Arizona state accountability tests using paper, instead on a computer, due to issues with internet connections in Crown King.

== Student body ==
Because the number of students has been habitually a small number, Lily Altavena of The Arizona Republic wrote in 2019 that "It's hard to track how the student population has changed".

== Teachers ==
As of 1998, the average term of a teacher at the school since the 1960s was three years, and in the period 1900 up to 1960 the typical term was one year. According to Greer, due to teachers wanting a change of scenery, as of 1998, "Crown King has never had a long term teacher."

== Campus ==
Lily Altavena of The Arizona Republic stated that the building exterior color is "fire-engine red". PhD thesis author Vinson E. Greer described the color as "traditional one-room-school red". As of 1998 the interior has paintings depicting the Western United States and photographs of the school in earlier stages of its history. The school uses a propane heater, as of 1998. In previous eras, a stove using wood provided heating.

The school's classroom can be used as a performance stage. A curtain can be used to cordon off part of the classroom.

The kitchen facility has microwaves and a refrigerator. The microwave is used for students to heat their own lunches.

The school has a residence for the teacher.

The school facility has a playground with equipment and a basketball post.

There is an annex of the Yavapai County Free Library District in the back of the building. Its name is the Crown King Public Library.

== Feeder patterns ==
As of 2005, due to the condition of roads and long distances to high school facilities, students at Crown King attend several different high schools after graduation. A mother of a student quoted in a 2005 Arizona Republic article described the process as "the family has to split up".
