= Crown King Branch =

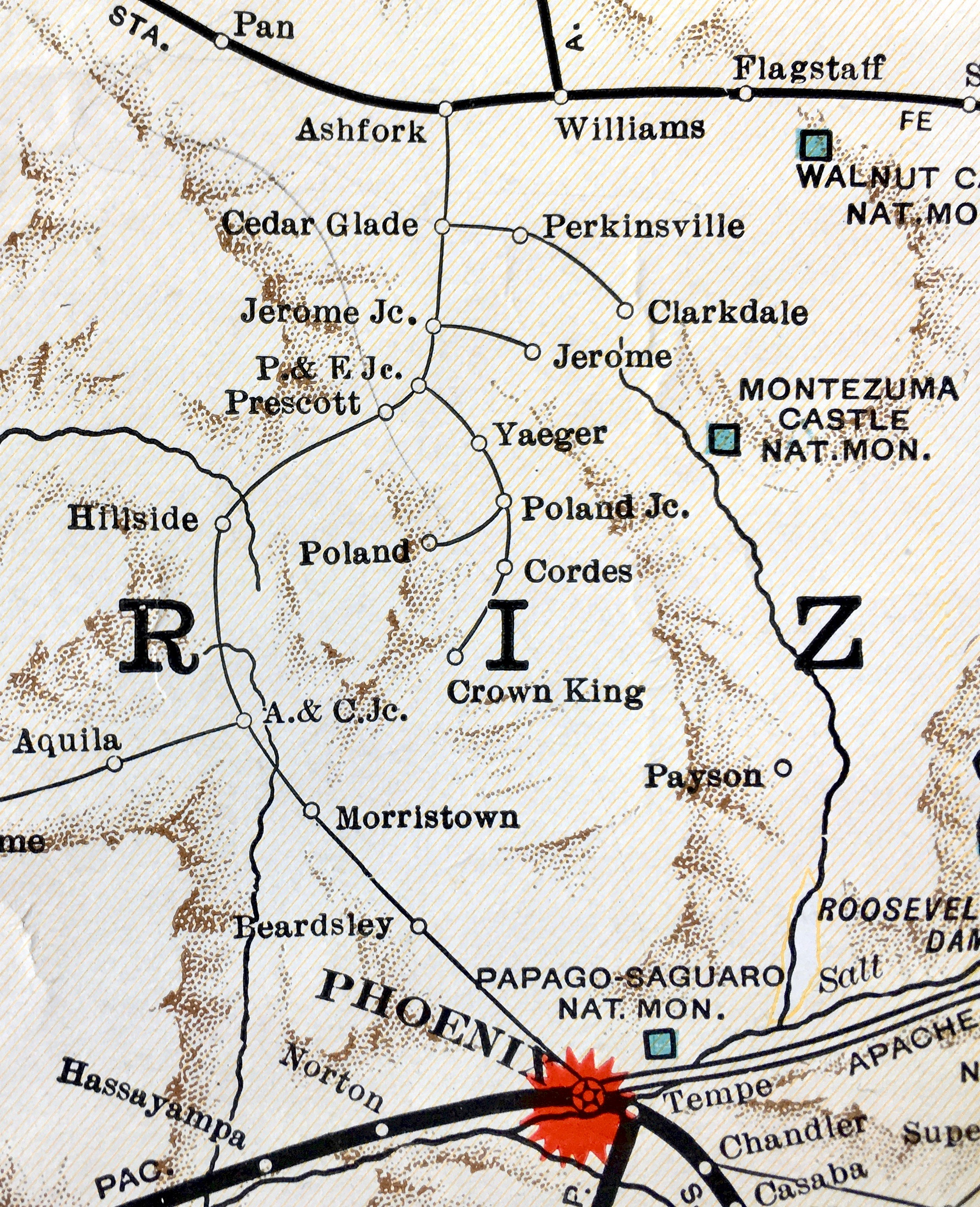
Crown King Branch route in 1930

Completed in 1904, the Crown King Branch of the Bradshaw Mountain Railroad, also known as Murphy's Impossible Railroad, linked the town of Crown King with the end of the Prescott and Eastern Railroad at Mayer, Arizona.

Frank Murphy began construction of the standard gauge railway in 1895. Construction was completed in 1904 when it reached Crown King. The tracks were torn up in 1927, leaving what is now known as FR 259.

The railroad got its name from the fact that Crown King is 2,000 feet higher than Mayer and the terrain between the two places is very steep. It's this fact that caused naysayers to believe that the two towns could not be linked by rail. In all, the railroad required five switchbacks, a tunnel and extremely high trestles to make the ascent to Crown King.

Much of the current Crown King road (after reaching Cleator) follows the old railroad bed. The old trestles were used by risky drivers however they were removed and the road was fixed to accommodate passenger cars and trucks. This process included adding sharp turns to the road to connect the gap where trestles once stood. The road also goes around a collapsed tunnel where the tracks once went.
