= Alexandra, Arizona =

Ghost town in Yavapai County, Arizona

- Ghost town
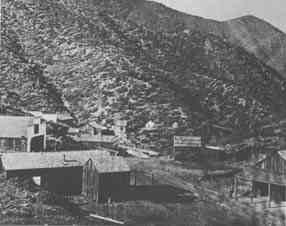
- Alexandra in the 1880s

- Location within Arizona Location within the United States
- Coordinates: 34°15′48″N 112°18′30″W
- Country: United States
- State: Arizona
- County: Yavapai
- Founded: June 1875
- Abandoned: circa 1903
- Founder: E.G. Peck
- Named for: T.M. Alexander

Population
  - Total: 0
- Time zone: MST (no DST)
- Post office opened: August 6, 1878
- Post office closed: March 25, 1896

Alexandra is a ghost town in Yavapai County, Arizona, United States. The ghost town was settled during the frontier days of 1875 as a mining camp until abandoned in 1896. Alexandra is ten miles (16 km) east of Mayer.

== History ==
Alexandra was founded by E.G. Peck, the owner of the Peck Mine, a famous mining company at the time, T.M. Alexander, William Cole and a man named Curtis Coe Bean. One day in June 1875, while walking through the Bradshaw Mountains, Peck noticed a peculiar rock partly underground. After examination, the rock proved to be pure silver and the first of Alexandra was founded. The town is located in Peck Canyon and was named Alexandra after Mrs. T.M. Alexander, a founder and the first lady to be at the town. A long mountain road separated the town from Mayer. The silver ore produced from the mine was taken via pack train through Bradshaws to Aztlan Mill, thirty miles (48 km) away.

This became troublesome, so eventually, Peck built his own mill at Alexandra, in 1877. A year later a post office was established. The town boomed and grew to seventy-five to 100 buildings. General stores, saloons, boarding houses, livery stables, a blacksmith and a brewery all existed there. Alexandra was lively, until litigation problems began and, by 1879, the town was mostly uninhabited and remained so for years. The post office closed in 1896, but in 1903, a new mine shaft was founded at Peck Mine. This did not save the town though, apparently Alexandra never thrived again and became a ghost.

Alexandra's population was 190 in 1890.
