= Cliff-rose =

Cliff-rose is a common name for several plants and may refer to:

- Armeria maritima, the sea thrift, a low growing, salt-tolerant plant on sea cliffs
- Purshia, a genus of plants native to arid climates of western North America
