= Horsethief Basin Lake =

Reservoir in central Arizona

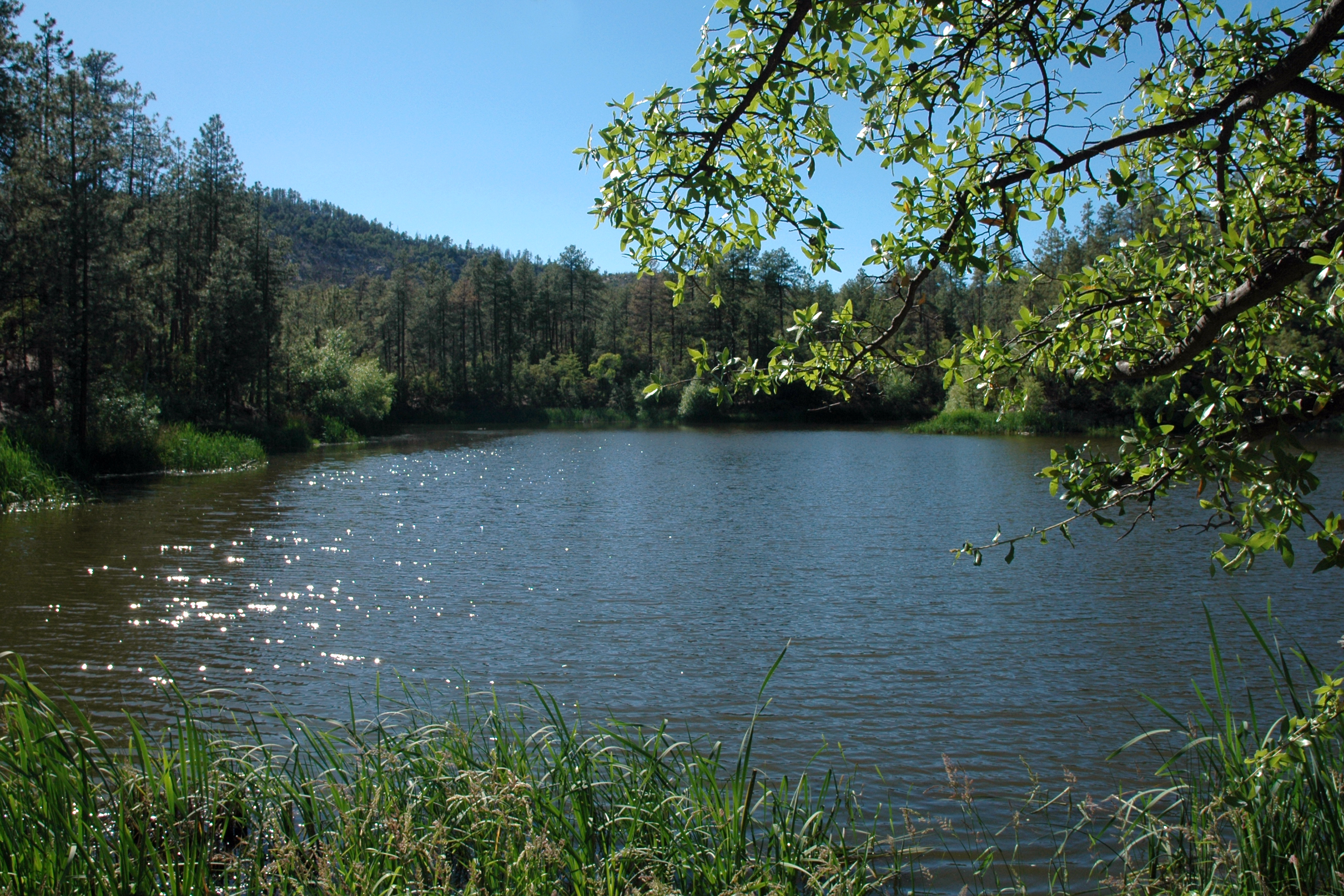
- View across lake from eastern shore

- Location within Arizona
- Location: Bradshaw Mountains, Prescott National Forest, Yavapai County, Arizona, United States
- Coordinates: 34°9′40.75″N 112°17′35.39″W
- Type: Reservoir
- Basin countries: United States
- Managing agency: United States Forest Service
- Surface area: 2 acres (0.81 ha)
- Average depth: 10 ft (3.0 m)
- Surface elevation: 6,000 ft (1,800 m)

Horsethief Basin Lake is a reservoir in the Bradshaw Mountains and the Prescott National Forest, in central Arizona, United States. It is located near Crown King in eastern Yavapai County. Fish species present include Bluegill, Largemouth Bass, Channel Catfish, and Muskie.

== Features ==
Horsethief Basin Resort began as a park facility of the City of Phoenix, built in 1936−1937 with assistance from the Public Works Administration (PWA) and Civilian Conservation Corps (CCC). In 1966 the city sold its interest in the resort buildings to private owners, and the area reverted to administration by the U.S. Forest Service as part of the Prescott National Forest.

A tract of USFS Recreation Residences exists in Horsethief Basin.

The reservoir's dam is open to pedestrians and anglers. Boating is allowed on the lake.

== Fish species ==
- Largemouth Bass
- Sunfish
- Channel Catfish (stocked)
- Tiger Musky (stocked)
