= Cordes, Arizona =

Ghost town in Yavapai County

- Ghost town
- Location within Arizona Location within the United States
- Coordinates: 34°18′12″N 112°10′01″W
- Country: United States
- State: Arizona
- County: Yavapai
- Elevation: 3,763 ft (1,147 m)
- Time zone: UTC-7 (MST (no DST))

Cordes is a ghost town located eight miles southeast of the area of Mayer in Yavapai County, Arizona, United States. Cordes was established in 1883 by John Henry Cordes.

The town was originally destined to be called Antelope Junction; however, Cordes' application for a post office in that name was denied in 1883. The reason was that there was already an Antelope Station in Arizona. That town is now called Stanton. The second name that Cordes chose was his own, which was approved. The Cordes post office closed in 1944 and the town was abandoned in the 1950s.
