= Crown King, Arizona =

Unincorporated community in Yavaipai County

- Unincorporated community
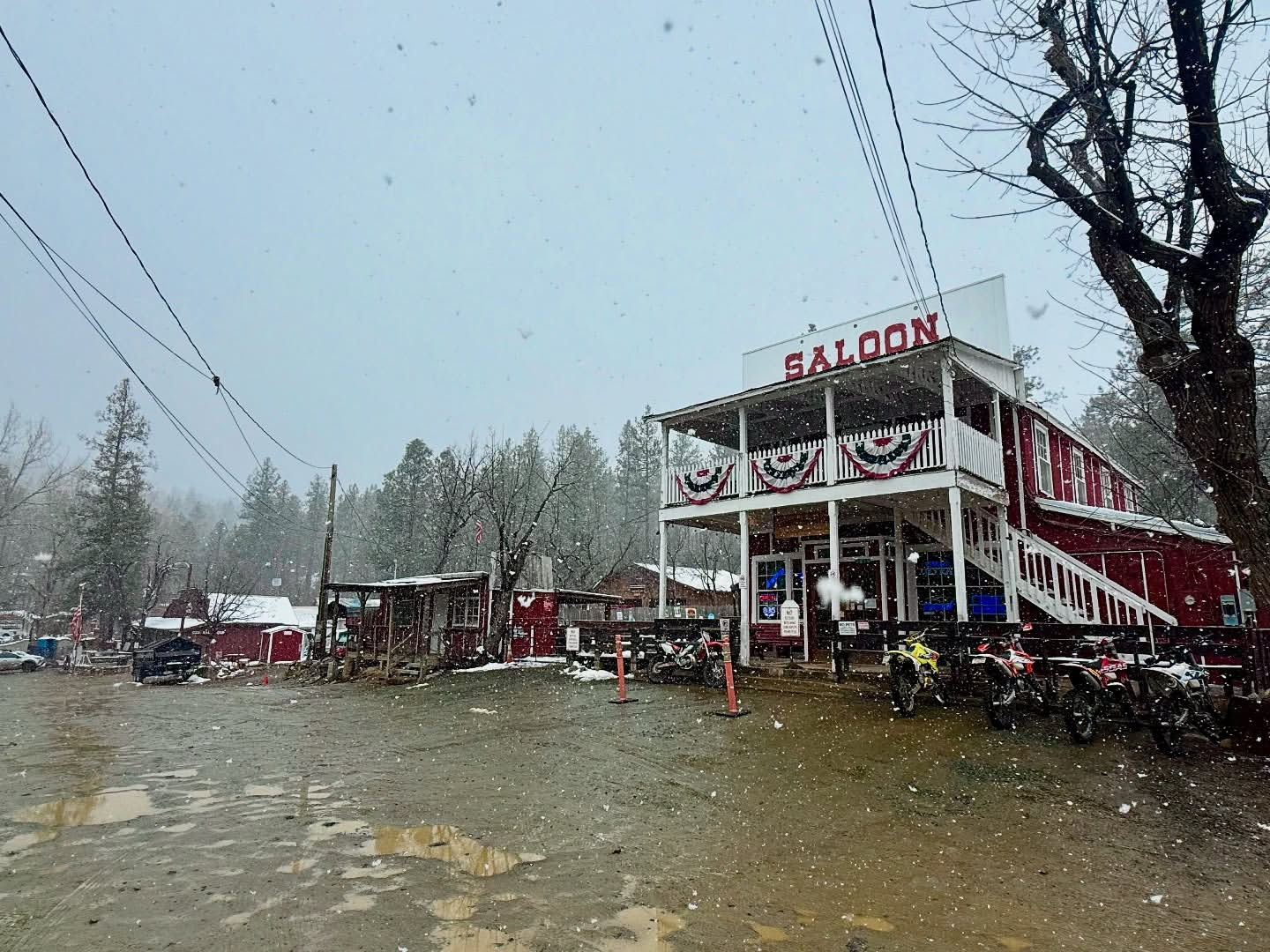
- Main Street in Crown King (2025)

- Location in the state of Arizona Crown King, Arizona (the United States)
- Coordinates: 34°12′20″N 112°20′19″W
- Country: United States
- State: Arizona
- County: Yavapai
- Founded: 1875
- Named for: Crowned King Mine
- Elevation: 5,771 ft (1,759 m)
- Time zone: UTC-7 (MST)
- Post Office opened: July 29, 1888
- GNIS feature ID: 28197

Crown King is an unincorporated community in Yavapai County, Arizona, United States. Crown King has a ZIP Code of 86343; according to the 2020–2024 American Community Survey 5-year estimates, ZIP Code Tabulation Area (ZCTA) 86343 had a population of 194. The site of a former gold mining town, Crown King is 28 miles west of Interstate 17 on Senator Highway, high in the Bradshaw Mountains. The community is named after the Crowned King mine, but the name was shortened to Crown King in 1888. Horsethief Basin Lake is located 6.5 miles southeast of Crown King on Crown King Rd/Forest 259 Rd.

== History ==
An estimated US$2,000,000 in gold was taken from the Crowned King Mine alone; the mines have been closed since the 1950s and for the past half-century tourism has been the only reliable source of income in the area, despite the fact that the unpaved, mountainous access roads are rocky, rough and slow to drive.

The first recorded gold claim in Crown King was "Buckeye" and was filed by Rod McKinnon on July 1, 1875. Over the next 40 years, more than 15 mines or claims were made in the area. At its height, the town had 500 buildings, including several company stores and boarding houses, two Chinese restaurants and a post office. The town was electrified by 1897 and had one telephone at that time.

While an active mining town, Crown King was served by the Bradshaw Mountain Railroad. Rail service to the area began in 1904 upon completion of "Murphy's Impossible Railroad" – a series of switchbacks and trestles that ascended the mountain terrain between Cleator and Crown King. The railroad began in Mayer, Arizona, connecting with Murphy's Prescott and Eastern Railroad and extended for 28 miles amid the rocky terrain.

Crown King was the terminus (1904–1926) of the railroad, built by Frank M. Murphy to serve the mines of the southern Bradshaw Mountains. However, these mines were never very productive, and the BMRR was a financial failure. The line was abandoned in 1926. Much of the road to Crown King uses the old railroad bed.

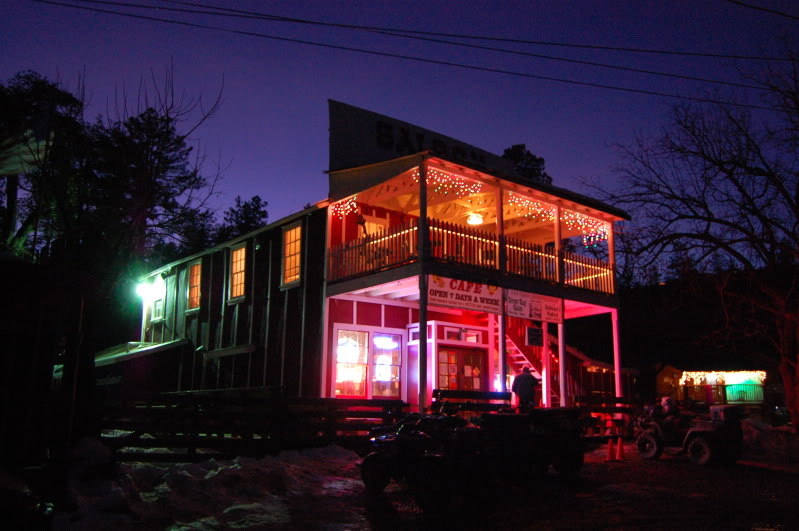
Crown King Saloon

Of the buildings still standing and in use in Crown King, the Crown King Saloon has maintained its place as the center of activity in town. The Saloon was originally constructed and operated in the nearby mining town of Oro Belle (now also a ghost town). In 1910, it was disassembled and brought to Crown King piece by piece after the mine at Oro Belle had played out. The building was home to a brothel and bar in both towns and now serves the public as a hotel, cafe, and bar. The town has a cemetery nearby.

The red one-room schoolhouse was built in 1917 and still serves a small number of K–8 students. High school students typically leave town to attend class 14 miles away in Mayer.

The post office was established on July 29, 1888, and was discontinued on May 15, 1954. It has since reopened inside the Crown King General Store.

== Climate ==
According to the Köppen climate classification system, Crown King has a Mediterranean climate, classified as Csb on climate maps. It is atypical of this type because its dry season only covers the first half of summer and is followed by heavy monsoonal thunderstorms in July and August.

An exposed location relative to moist southerly airflows from the Gulf of California gives Crown King among the highest precipitation in Arizona – in fact it holds the official state record for the most precipitation in one calendar month with 16.95 inches (430.5 mm) in August 1951, and the station has thrice approached this record with 16.21 inches (411.7 mm) in December 1967 (including 87.3 inches or 2.2 meters of snow), 16.63 inches (422.4 mm) in February 1980 and 16.75 inches (425.4 mm) in January 1993. The wettest days have been April 17, 1917, with 7.65 inches (194.3 mm) and December 31, 1948, with 7.10 inches (180.3 mm). The wettest calendar year has been 1978 with 56.42 inches (1,433.1 mm) and the driest 1960 with 14.31 inches (363.5 mm). Snowfall can be heavy, with 87.3 inches (2.2 m) falling in January 1949, although in general snow cover is minimal due to relatively warm days in winter.

Climate data for Crown King, Arizona (1914–1995)
Month	Jan	Feb	Mar	Apr	May	Jun	Jul	Aug	Sep	Oct	Nov	Dec	Year
Record high °F (°C)	70 (21)	75 (24)	79 (26)	85 (29)	94 (34)	104 (40)	102 (39)	101 (38)	94 (34)	90 (32)	80 (27)	69 (21)	104 (40)
Mean daily maximum °F (°C)	49.0 (9.4)	52.0 (11.1)	56.9 (13.8)	66.0 (18.9)	74.0 (23.3)	86.0 (30.0)	87.7 (30.9)	84.4 (29.1)	80.1 (26.7)	69.7 (20.9)	58.2 (14.6)	51.3 (10.7)	68.0 (20.0)
Mean daily minimum °F (°C)	25.8 (−3.4)	27.3 (−2.6)	30.4 (−0.9)	35.8 (2.1)	41.4 (5.2)	51.6 (10.9)	57.5 (14.2)	55.8 (13.2)	49.6 (9.8)	39.9 (4.4)	31.2 (−0.4)	26.7 (−2.9)	39.4 (4.1)
Record low °F (°C)	−5 (−21)	0 (−18)	11 (−12)	16 (−9)	22 (−6)	31 (−1)	41 (5)	43 (6)	32 (0)	17 (−8)	12 (−11)	−5 (−21)	−5 (−21)
Average precipitation inches (mm)	3.34 (85)	3.16 (80)	2.91 (74)	1.43 (36)	0.60 (15)	0.46 (12)	3.37 (86)	4.38 (111)	2.11 (54)	1.48 (38)	1.89 (48)	3.34 (85)	28.47 (724)
Average snowfall inches (cm)	9.9 (25)	7.8 (20)	6.7 (17)	2.1 (5.3)	0.1 (0.25)	0.0 (0.0)	0.0 (0.0)	0.0 (0.0)	0.0 (0.0)	0.3 (0.76)	2.1 (5.3)	8.2 (21)	37.2 (94.61)
Average precipitation days (≥ 0.01 inch)	5	5	5	3	2	2	9	9	5	3	3	4	55
Source: Western Regional Climate Center

== Education ==
The Crown King Elementary School District has one school, Crown King Elementary School, a K-8 school. The facility is in a one room schoolhouse. The school began operations in 1906, and a permanent school facility opened in 1916. Circa 2019 enrollment varied between one and around twelve students at a time.

The community does not have a high school, and the Crown King district area is not within a high school district. Scott Craven of The Arizona Republic stated that the condition of roads and distances make traveling to a high school from Crown King difficult, and that the distance to the closest high school was one hour travel time. According to Craven, as of 2005 some families have the mothers rent apartments in Chino Valley or Prescott so students could attend high school in those communities. Craven stated that some other families choose to have the high school-aged children live with other family members. Lily Altavena of The Arizona Republic stated in 2019 that several area students went to a private institution, Orme School in the Mayer, Arizona area; this school closed in 2025.

Yavapai County Free Library District operates the Crown King Public Library, in the back of the school building.
