= Bradshaw Mountains =

Mountain range in Arizona

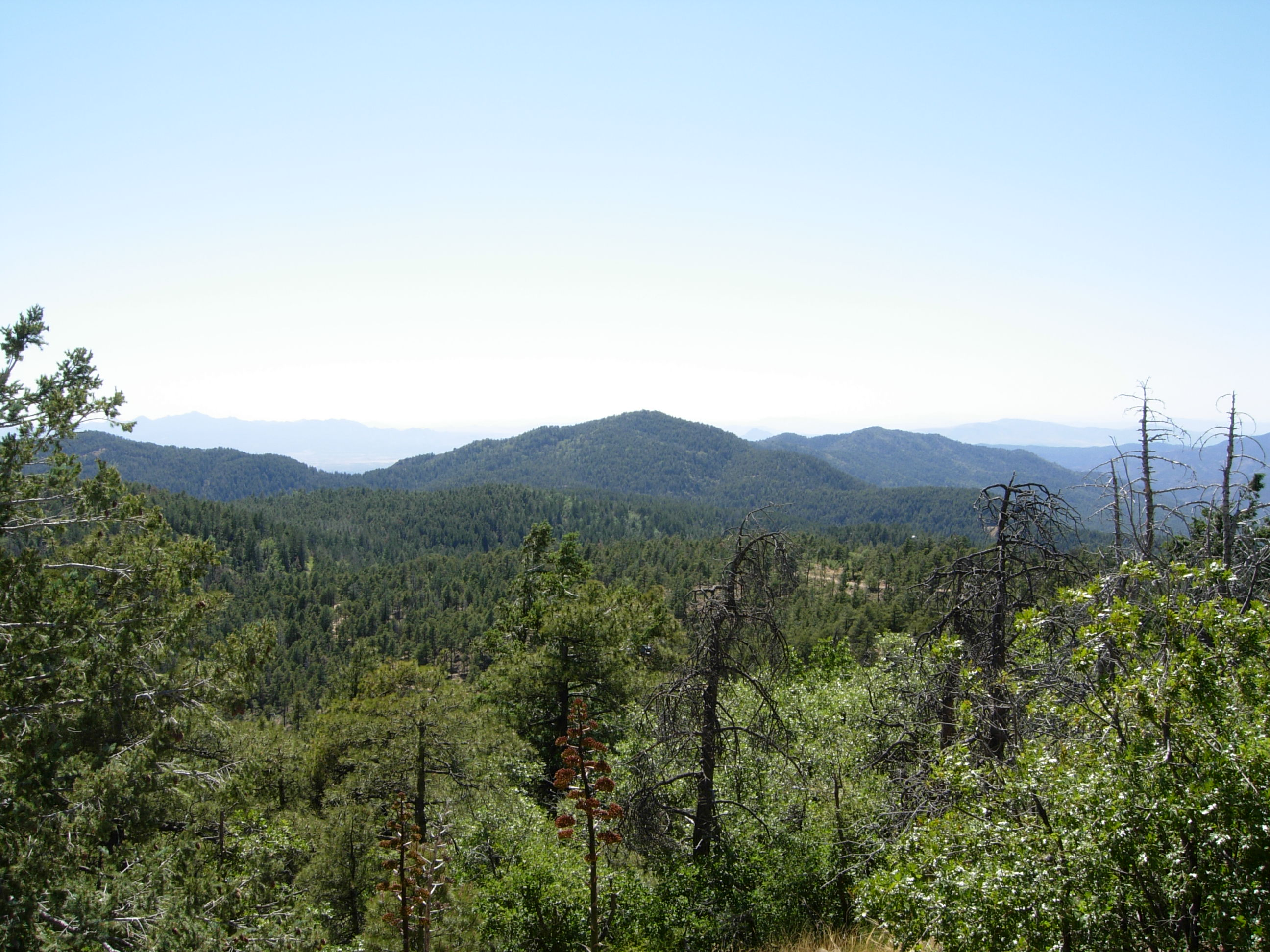
- The Bradshaw Mountains seen from the peak of Mount Union

Highest point
- Peak: Mount Union (Arizona)
- Elevation: 7,979 ft (2,432 m)
- Coordinates: 34°24′53″N 112°24′14″W

Dimensions
- Length: 40 mi (64 km) north-south

Geography
- Location within Arizona
- Country: United States
- State: Arizona
- County: Yavapai
- Borders on: Weaver Mountains, Sierra Prieta, Black Hills and New River Mountains

Geology
- Rock age: Precambrian
- Rock types: granite and schist

The Bradshaw Mountains are a mountain range in central Arizona, United States, named for brothers Isaac and William D. Bradshaw after their deaths, having been formerly known in English as the Silver Mountain Range.

== History ==
The first known settlements in the Bradshaws were a group of Yavapai people, called the Kwevkapaya who built forts and mined copper from around AD 1100 to 1600. They called the mountains Wi:kañacha, meaning "rough, black range of rocks"

The Walker Party found gold, and within a few years, the Bradshaws were filling up with settlers mining for gold, silver, and copper. By the early part of the 20th century, most of the towns that had sprung up were little more than ghost towns.

== Geography ==
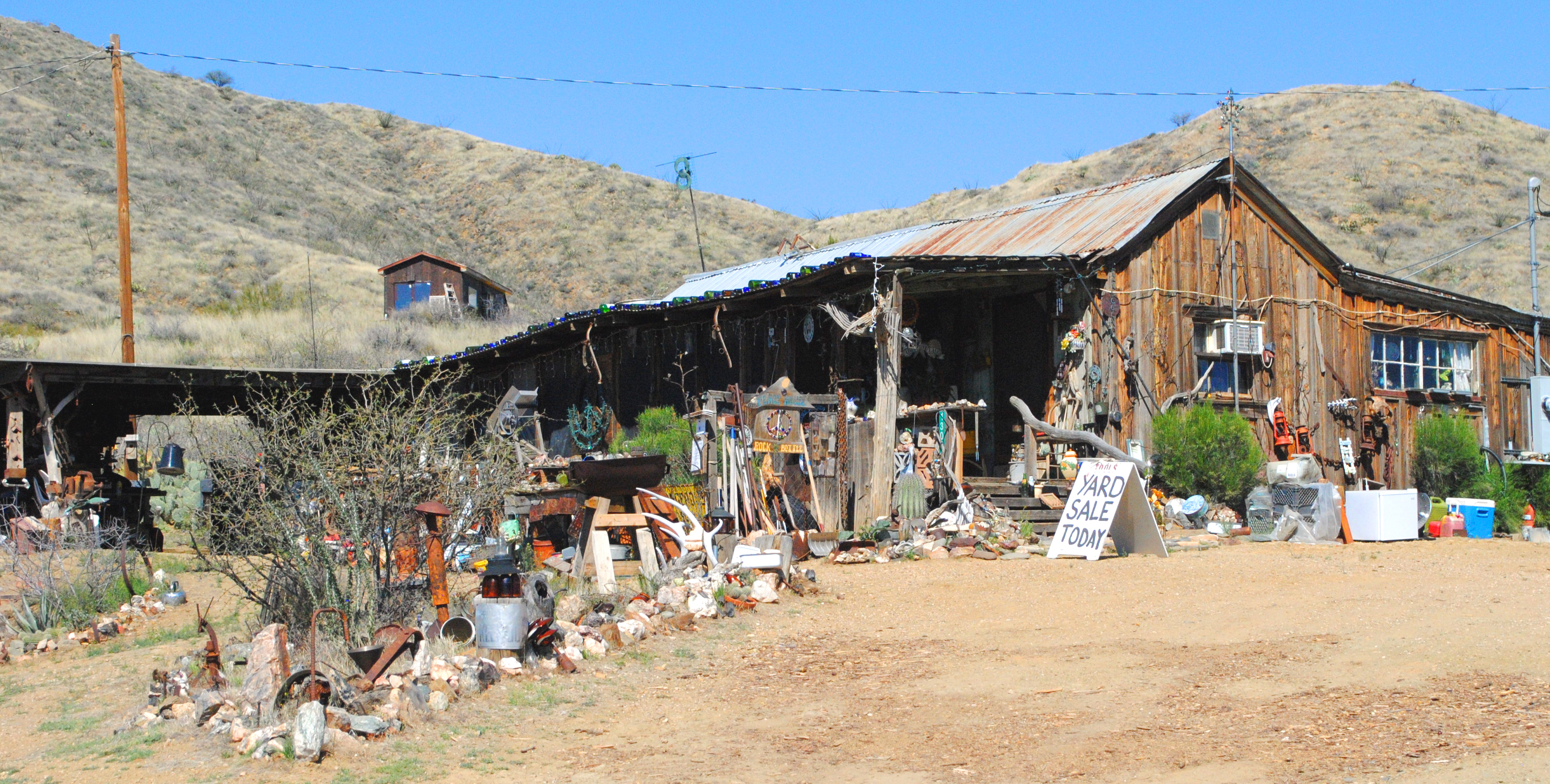
Cleator, Arizona, 2015

Located approximately 5 miles (8.0 km) south of Prescott, Arizona, between the Agua Fria River on the east, and the Hassayampa River on the west, the range is 40 miles (64 km) long, and almost 25 miles (40 km) wide.

=== Peaks ===
- Mount Union, named during the Civil War, is the highest, at 7,979 feet (2,432 m).
- Mount Davis – second highest at 7,897 feet (2,407 m), named for Jefferson Davis.
- Spruce Mountain – 7,696 feet (2,346 m), misnamed for Douglas firs mistaken for Spruces.
- Mount Tritle – 7,793 feet (2,375 m), named for Frederick Augustus Tritle Governor of Arizona Territory (1882–1885).
- Towers Mountain – 7,628 feet (2,325 m).
- Maverick Mountain – 7,443 feet (2,269 m).
- Mount Wasson – 4,687 feet (1,429 m).

== Geology ==
The Bradshaw Mountains consist primarily of Precambrian granite, gneiss and schist.

== Ecology ==
The biotic community of the Bradshaws ranges from interior chaparral and montane conifer forest, to plains and desert grassland, and Sonoran desert scrub. Many species of trees are found in the Bradshaws, including the California Fan Palm, Piñon, Alligator Juniper, Ponderosa pine, blue spruce, Quaking Aspen, white fir, and Douglas fir. As well, much wildlife is present, including javelina, mountain lion, bobcat, black bear, mule deer, porcupine, fox, skunk, abert's squirrel, rock squirrel, wild turkey, many species of reptiles and amphibians, and many species of birds.

Several creeks have been dammed to form reservoirs, including Lynx Lake, Goldwater Lake, Lake Marapai, Hassayampa Lake, Horsethief Lake, and Cedar Tank.

== Human use ==
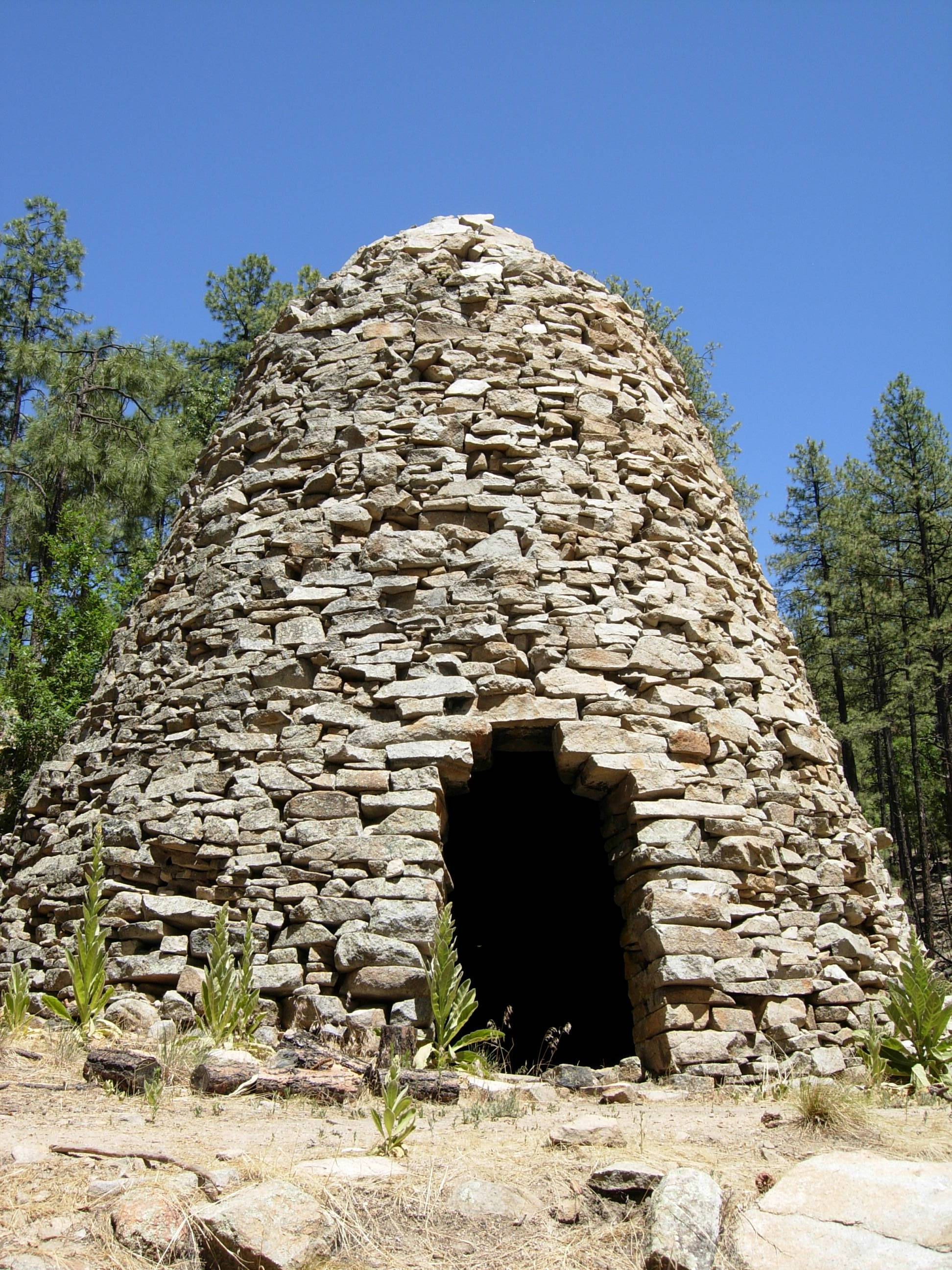
An abandoned charcoal kiln, near Walker, Arizona

Gold was first discovered in the Bradshaws in 1863, over $2,000,000 worth being taken from just the Crown King Mine. Copper and silver were also mined in the early part of the 20th century. Within Mount Union lies the Poland silver mine. Its adit, now sealed, may be accessed from Poland, near Walker.

=== Ghost towns and other settlements ===
There are over 40 ghost towns in the Bradshaw Mountains, including Crown King, Bumble Bee, Goodwin, Bradshaw City, Alexandra and Cleator.

== Protected areas ==
Much of the Bradshaw Mountains are on Prescott National Forest land. Other parks include Horsethief Basin Recreational Area, Lynx Lake Recreational Area, and the Castle Creek Wilderness.

== See also ==
- Hieroglyphic Mountains
- Castle Hot Springs (Arizona)
