= Walker, Arizona =

- Populated place
- Location within the state of Arizona Walker (the United States)
- Coordinates: 34°27′21″N 112°22′42″W
- Country: United States
- State: Arizona
- County: Yavapai
- Elevation: 6,289 ft (1,917 m)
- Time zone: UTC-7 (Mountain (MST))
  - Summer (DST): UTC-7 (MST)
- Area code: 928
- FIPS code: 04-80710
- GNIS feature ID: 35817

Walker is a populated place situated in Yavapai County, Arizona, United States. It has an estimated elevation of 6,289 feet (1,917 m) above sea level.

== History ==
The settlement was named after 19th-century mountain man Joseph R. Walker.

Walker's population was 200 in 1890, and 39 in 1920.
