= Prescott and Eastern Railroad =

Former mining railroad in Arizona

Overview
- Headquarters: Prescott, Arizona
- Locale: Central Arizona
- Dates of operation: 1897–1911

Technical
- Track gauge: 4 ft 8 1/2 in (1,435 mm) standard gauge

The Prescott and Eastern Railroad (P&E) was a non-operating subsidiary of the Santa Fe, Prescott and Phoenix Railway (SFP&P) in Arizona. The 26.4 mile (42.5 km) common carrier railroad was built to serve the mines in the region. The railroad built from a connection with the SFP&P at Entro and extended south to Poland Junction and terminated at Mayer. At Poland Junction and Mayer the P&E connected with the Bradshaw Mountain Railroad, also a non-operating subsidiary of the SFP&P. After various mergers the P&E was merged into the Atchison, Topeka and Santa Fe Railway. The line was later abandoned by the Santa Fe Railway. The first four miles of the line are now the Iron King Trail to Prescott Valley, Arizona.

== History ==
The railroad was incorporated on September 14, 1897. It commenced grading from the SFP&P connection at Entro (northeast of Prescott) on March 10, 1898. On September 30, 1898, the 26.4 mile (42.5 km) line was completed.

On December 30, 1911, the P&E was merged into the California, Arizona and Santa Fe Railway, a non-operating subsidiary (paper railroad) of the Santa Fe Railway.

== Motive power ==
Although the P&E was operated by the SFP&P, the P&E did have two locomotives.

P&E #11 (builder number 3073) and #12 (builder number 3072) were Brooks Locomotive Works 4-6-0 (also known as a Chesapeake or Ten-wheeler, UIC classification 2'C) steam locomotives with 19×24 inch cylinders and 56 inch (142 cm) drivers with a weight of 106,800 pounds (48,490 kg) and 22,270 pounds (10,110 kg) of effort. Both were built in November 1898.

P&E #11 and #12 were later SFP&P #11 and #12, then later ATSF #2431 and 2432. Both locomotives were later scrapped; #11 in October 1927 and #12 in April 1922.

=== Operating railroads ===
- 1897–1912 by the Santa Fe, Prescott & Phoenix Railway
- 1912– by the Atchison, Topeka & Santa Fe Railway

== Route ==
The line was eventually abandoned by the ATSF.

- Entro – connection with SFP&P mainline
- Yaeger
- Dewey
- Humboldt
- Poland Junction – connection with Bradshaw Mountain Railroad's Poland Branch
- Arizona City
- Mayer – connection with Bradshaw Mountain Railroad's line to Crown King

== See also ==
- List of defunct Arizona railroads
