= Lonesome Valley =

Landform in Yavapai County, Arizona

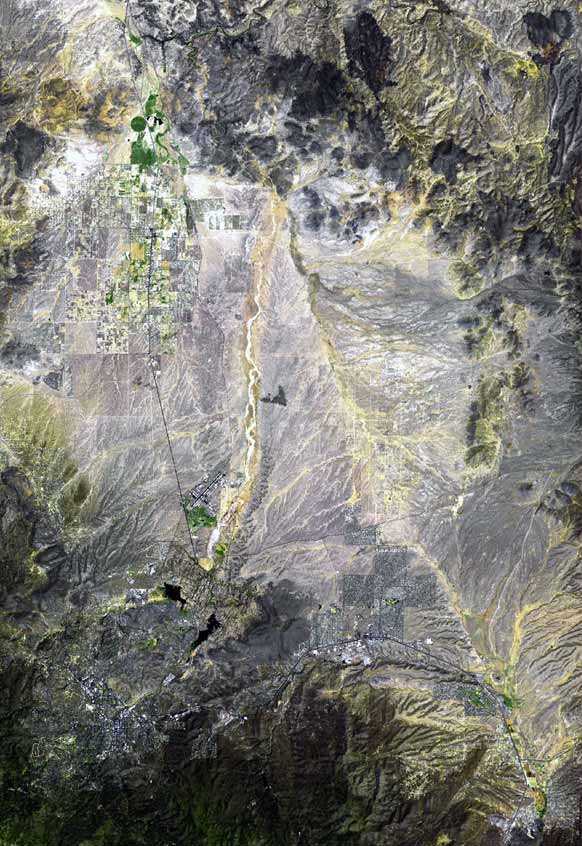

- Location within Arizona
- Length: 23 mi (37 km) NNW x SSE

Geography
- Country: United States
- State: Arizona
- County: Yavapai
- Communities: Chino Valley; Prescott Valley; Paulden
- Borders on: List: Chino Valley (Arizona); Little Black Mesa; Verde River; Black Hills (Yavapai County); Prescott Valley, AZ; Agua Fria River; Prescott, AZ; Granite Dells; Granite Mountain (Arizona); Sullivan Buttes
- Coordinates: 34°52′08″N 112°13′58″W
- River: Granite Creek
- Interactive map of Lonesome Valley

Lonesome Valley is a 23-mile (37 km) long valley located in central-north Yavapai County, Arizona; the valley is an extension southeastwards from Chino Valley (Arizona), the location of the Big Chino Wash, which becomes the Verde River at Paulden, Arizona; Paulden is located at the northwest terminus of Lonesome Valley. A small sub-valley is located on the northeast perimeter of Chino Valley, Arizona, located in the center-northwest of Lonesome Valley. The valley is named Little Chino Valley, and is the small valley link between Chino Valley, northwest, and Lonesome Valley, southeast.

The notable landforms of Granite Mountain lie west-southwest, and Granite Dells are at the southwest perimeter. The massif of the Black Hills (Yavapai County) form the east border of Lonesome Valley.

An important water divide is at the south terminus region of the valley at the north of Prescott Valley, Arizona, separating the Verde River watershed from the Agua Fria River watershed; both watersheds are north tributaries to the Gila River, flowing west across central-south Arizona.

== Description ==
Lonesome Valley is an approximately north-northwest trending valley. It is dissected in its center by an upside-down V-shaped, double watercourse. Granite Creek–(Granite Creek Wash) is west, and an unnamed wash is east-(a tributary to Granite Wash); both flow north to meet the Verde River, at the north of Little Black Mesa. The unnamed wash at Lonesome Valley's south end flows south from the water divide, north of Prescott Valley, to meet the Agua Fria River. Coyote Wash courses southwesterly just east, (see satellite photo).

Lonesome Valley appears somewhat circular, but the Chino Valley townsite is on a flatland region at the northwest. Alluvial fans lie at the east with the west flank of the Black Hills. The Granite Mountain (Arizona) region at the west-southwest, has a large dissected alluvial section at its northeast.

The southwest perimeter of Lonesome Valley borders the north of Granite Dells, where Granite Creek exits flowing north. Watson Lake is at the south of the Dells, where Granite Creek enters.

The highpoint of the valley is Black Hill, 5,030 feet (1,533 m)), on the east bank of Granite Creek, and at valley center-southwest. (on satellite photo: black, at southeast of Chino Valley, northeast of the green, Antelope Hills Golf Course-(note also black shadows; sun, from southeast))

=== Southwest valley region ===
The southwest of the valley is bordered by the north of Granite Dells. Attached at the east of the Dells is Glassford Hill, at 6,177 feet (1,883 m)). The prominent hill forms the west perimeter of the Prescott Valley townsite. Granite Creek flows north (slightly north-northeast) from the west, and the 'unnamed wash' flows northwest at the hill's east.

== Access ==
Arizona State Route 89 traverses the west of Lonesome Valley. From the southwest its route comes from Presott, passes Watson Lake, and then exits the Granite Dells to traverse to Chino Valley, Arizona. It continues to Paulden, Arizona the northwest perimeter of Lonesome Valley. Paulden is the site of Sullivan Lake-(at northeast Sullivan Buttes), and it is a small reservoir on the Verde River. The small canyon below the reservoir is at the west end of Little Black Mesa, and the outfall site of Granite Creek with the Verde River.

At Granite Dells, Arizona State Route 89A, exits from Arizona 89 and traverses east, northeast to the Black Hills, and Route 89A is the route to Jerome on the east flank of the mountains. Arizona 89A is at the south Lonesome Valley terminus region, and traverses adjacent the water divide region north of Prescott Valley. The Agua Fria River is to the south, where Lynx Creek flows north from the Bradshaw Mountains, turns east, then the Agua Fria turns southeast and south. Coyote Wash and a second unnamed wash west-(flowing south from the water divide, with the lineage of Lonesome Valley), flow south into the Agua Fria. Arizona 69, and routes through Prescott Valley, access the southern region of Lonesome Valley, or Glassford Hill, west, or regions of the west flank of the Black Hills to the northeast.

A route, Perkinsville Road from Chino Valley, Arizona exits east from Arizona 89 to the Lonesome Valley center, then turns north through the north valley, then the Little Black Mesa to Perkinsville, Arizona on the Verde River; the route continues north from Perkinsville to meet South Road, to reach Williams, about 30 miles (48 km) north.

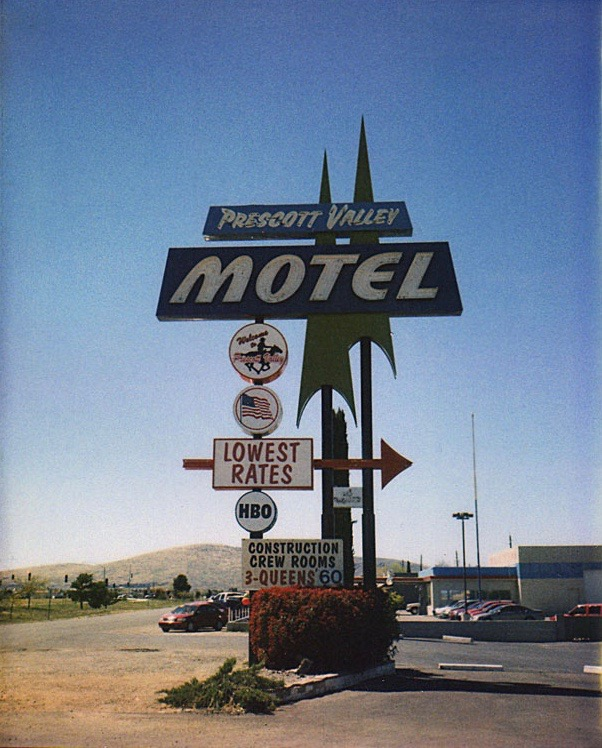
Glassford Hill, view from Prescott Valley (adjacent south terminus of valley)
