= Granite Creek (Arizona) =

River in Yavapai County, Arizona

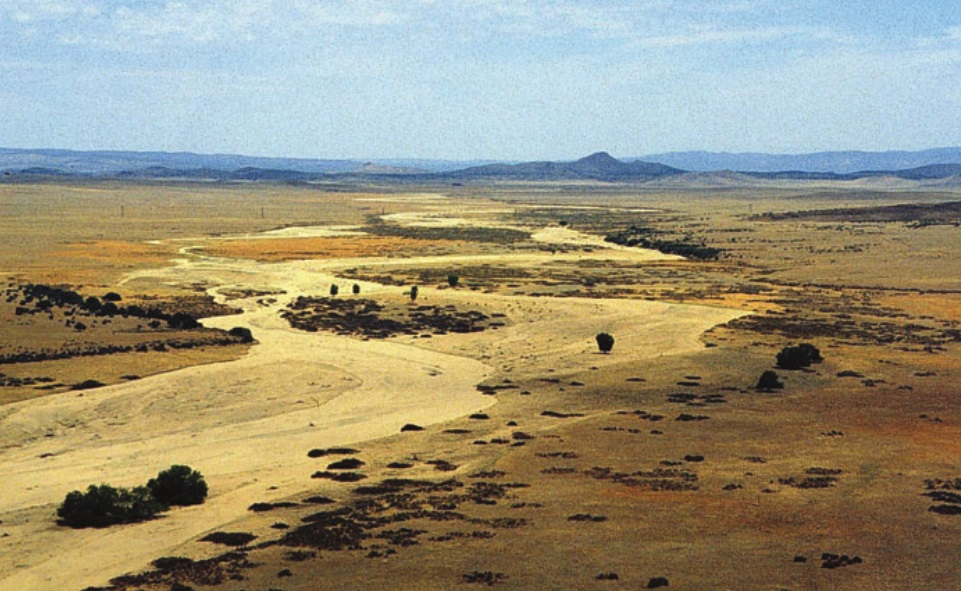
- Granite Creek in July

- Location of the mouth of Granite Creek

Location
- Country: United States
- State: Arizona
- County: Yavapai
- City: Prescott

Physical characteristics
- Source: Wolverton Mountain
  - location: Bradshaw Mountains, Prescott National Forest
  - coordinates: 34°29′58″N 112°30′34″W
  - elevation: 6,292 ft (1,918 m)
- Mouth: Verde River
  - coordinates: 34°51′46″N 112°25′55″W
  - elevation: 4,236 ft (1,291 m)
- Length: 38 mi (61 km)
- Basin size: 359 sq mi (930 km^{2})
- Discharge
  - location: 2 miles (3.2 km) north of Prescott
  - average: 7 cu ft/s (0.20 m^{3}/s)
  - minimum: 0 cu ft/s (0 m^{3}/s)
  - maximum: 6,200 cu ft/s (180 m^{3}/s)

Granite Creek is a 38-mile (61 km) tributary of the Verde River in the U.S. state of Arizona. It flows generally north-northeast from the Bradshaw Mountains of west-central Arizona through the city of Prescott and the Granite Dells to meet the river at the north end of the Little Chino Valley east of Sullivan Lake.

== Course ==
Granite Creek begins in the Prescott National Forest as an intermittent stream in the Bradshaw Mountains of west-central Arizona. It flows briefly southeast, then curves generally north, passing under Arizona State Route 89, which then runs along its left. As the creek nears White Spar Campground, Schoolhouse Gulch enters from the right. Below the campground, Granite Creek leaves the national forest, then receives Bannon Creek from the right and Manzanita Creek from the left. As it enters the city of Prescott, Granite Creek passes under Route 89 and receives Aspen Creek from the left.

Miller Creek enters from the left near north side of Prescott, as Granite Creek flows to the northeast, passing through the Yavapai-Prescott Indian Reservation and under Arizona State Route 89 again. Slaughterhouse Gulch enters from the right as the stream continues northeast to Watson Lake. Downstream of the lake, Granite Creek passes through Granite Dells and under Arizona State Route 89A. Willow Creek enters from the left. From here the creek meanders north-northeast through Little Chino Valley past Prescott Municipal Airport, which is on the left. Bottleneck Wash enters from the left, and the creek flows by the town of Chino Valley, also on the left. Granite Creek enters the Verde River between Sullivan Lake and Muldoon Canyon.

== Watershed ==
The Granite Creek watershed is bordered on the west by the Bill Williams watershed on the southwest, the Hassayampa watershed on the south, and the Agua Fria watershed on the southeast. Elevations within the watershed vary from 7,979 feet (2,432 m) on Mount Union to 4,236 feet (1,291 m) at the mouth.

== See also ==
- List of rivers of Arizona
