= Chino Valley =

Chino Valley can refer to:

- Chino Valley (Arizona), the valley location, (north) Chino Valley, Arizona
- Chino Valley, Arizona
  - Little Chino Valley, a sub-valley on the northeast perimeter of Chino Valley, Arizona
- Chino Valley, California (region)
  - Chino Valley Freeway
