= Apache Creek Wilderness =

Protected wilderness area in Arizona, United States

- IUCN category Ib (wilderness area)
- Location within the United States
- Location: Yavapai County, Arizona, US
- Nearest city: Paulden, AZ
- Coordinates: 34°52′42″N 112°54′14″W
- Area: 5,666 acres (23 km^{2})
- Established: 1984
- Governing body: U.S. Forest Service

Apache Creek Wilderness is a 5,666-acre (2,293 ha) wilderness area under the jurisdiction of the Chino Valley District of the Prescott National Forest in the U.S. state of Arizona. Established in 1984, the Wilderness contains rolling hills of juniper and pinyon pine, outcroppings of granite, three natural springs, and several important riparian areas including Apache Creek. Elevations range from 5,280 feet (1,609 m) to 6,970 feet (2,124 m), and the area provides excellent habitat for mountain lion and numerous bird species.

The wilderness is located in the southeast half of the Santa Maria Mountains; the Juniper Mesa Wilderness is located just north on Juniper Mesa, in the southeast Juniper Mountains, and across North Fork Creek.

== See also ==
- List of Arizona Wilderness Areas
- List of U.S. Wilderness Areas
