= Juniper Mesa Wilderness =

Protected area in the Prescott National Forest, Arizona

- IUCN category Ib (wilderness area)
- Location within the United States
- Location: Yavapai County, Arizona, United States
- Nearest city: Paulden
- Coordinates: 34°57′08″N 112°56′07″W
- Area: 7,406 acres (2,997 ha)
- Established: 1984
- Governing body: U.S. Forest Service

Juniper Mesa Wilderness is a 7,406-acre (2,997 ha) wilderness area in the Prescott National Forest in the U.S. state of Arizona. The mesa is about an hour's drive northwest of Prescott in the Juniper Mountains of Yavapai County. The wilderness varies in elevation from 5,600 to 7,000 feet (1,700 to 2,100 m). It is entirely within the Juniper Mountain quadrangle of the United States Geological Survey (USGS) topographic map.

A landscape largely of granite surrounds the mesa of Tapeats sandstone and Martin and Redwall limestones, a relict of an ancient and more extensive version of the Colorado Plateau. Steep canyons cut through the mesa. Views to the south and east include Apache Creek Wilderness and parts of the Granite Mountain, Woodchute, and Sycamore Canyon wilderness areas.

Pinyon pine and Utah juniper dominate the southern slopes of the mesa, while ponderosa pine and alligator juniper are more prevalent on northern slopes. Frequently seen are black bear, elk, mule deer, bobcats, and Abert's squirrels.

== Trails ==
Recreational opportunities include hiking, backpacking, horse riding, camping, wildlife viewing, and hunting for deer and small game. Multiple trails totalling 15 miles (24 km) in length cross the wilderness.

Juniper Mesa Trail, 6.3 miles (10.1 km) long, is the main trail in the wilderness. It begins at Juniper Springs, on the east side of the mesa and ends where it meets Oaks and Willows Trail. Other connecting trails are Juniper Springs Trail and Bull Springs Trail.

== See also ==
- List of Arizona Wilderness Areas
- List of U.S. Wilderness Areas
- Wilderness Act
