= Peavine Trail =

Peavine Trail may refer to:

- A section of rail trail in the Granite Dells, near Prescott, Arizona
- Peavine Trail, an old railroad bed in southern Florida, now part of Florida State Road 724
