= Watson Lake =

Watson Lake may refer to:

- Watson Lake, Yukon, a town in Canada
  - Watson Lake (electoral district), elects a member of the Legislative Assembly of the Yukon Territory, Canada
- Watson Lake (Arizona), a lake in the United States
- Watson Lake (California), a lake in the Sierra Nevada near Lake Tahoe
- Watson Lake, a lake in Faulkner County, Arkansas, United States
- Watson Lake, a lake in Logan County, Arkansas, United States
- Watson Lake (Radium line), a tugboat built and operated by the Radium Line, see boats of the Mackenzie River Watershed
