= Chino Valley High School =

Coordinates: 34.7466°N 112.4513°W

Location
- 760 E. Center Street; Chino Valley, Arizona 86323; United States

Information
- School type: Public high school
- Motto: Success begins with a CVHS Diploma
- Established: 1989 (37 years ago)
- School district: Chino Valley Unified School District
- CEEB code: 030053
- Principal: Justine Crawford
- Teaching staff: 29.58 (FTE)
- Grades: 9-12
- Enrollment: 762 (2023–2024)
- Student to teacher ratio: 25.42
- Colors: Royal blue, gray and orange
- Mascot: Cougars
- Website: cvhs.chinovalleyschools.com

Chino Valley High School is a high school in Chino Valley, Arizona, United States. It is the only high school under the jurisdiction of the Chino Valley Unified School District.

== Notable alumni ==
- Andy Pratt, former MLB player (Atlanta Braves, Chicago Cubs)
