= Chino Valley (Arizona) =

Landform in Arizona

- Location within Arizona
- Length: 70 mi (110 km) NW-SE
- Width: 10 mi (16 km)

Geography
- Country: United States
- State: Arizona
- Regions: Arizona transition zone; Coconino Plateau
- Counties: Yavapai; Coconino
- Population centers: Chino Valley, AZ; (Paulden); Seligman
- Borders on: List: Aubrey Valley; Coconino Plateau; Juniper Mountains; Santa Maria Mountains; Williamson Valley; Big Black Mesa; Black Hills (Yavapai County)
- Coordinates: 35.1620°N 112.7770°W
- Interactive map of Chino Valley (Arizona)

The Chino Valley of Arizona is a large, 70-mi (113 km) long valley, centered on Seligman, Arizona in northwest Yavapai County and southwest Coconino County. The valley is located at the southwest of the Coconino Plateau and lies in the extreme northwest of Arizona's transition zone.

Big Chino Wash drains the valley's center, and is one of the major northwest watersheds feeding into the Verde River, which drains southeast, then due south to meet the Salt and Gila Rivers at Phoenix.

Chino Valley, Arizona and Paulden lie at the southeast terminus of the valley's southern section, and is the common named beginning region of the Verde River.

== Description ==
Chino Valley has a 23-mi (40 km) long north-south section, north of Seligman. The southern section leaves the mesas and flatlands of the southwest Coconino Plateau, and begins a southeast trending route between foothills of mountain ranges to the west, and southwest; Big Black Mesa and an escarpment borders the lower southern section on its northeast, with Big Chino Wash, paralleling 4 mi southwest.

The southeast terminus of the southern section ends at Sullivan Lake, an intermittent lake of Big Chino Wash. It is also the beginning of a small canyon section of the Verde River. Paulden is located at Sullivan Lake and the lower watershed region of Chino Valley's south section.

The townsite of Chino Valley lies 9 mi due south of Paulden at the north and west section of a separate, north-trending valley, Little Chino Valley. Arizona State Route 89, a north-south stretch from Prescott to Ash Fork, goes through Chino Valley and Paulden; the Little Chino Valley lies east of the route at Chino Valley, AZ, and the route climbs into the higher elevations of the southwest Coconino Plateau, 5 mi northeast of Paulden at the east end of the Big Black Mesa.

== Flora ==
=== Trees ===
The valleys and lower elevation mountain slopes in northwest Arizona are often covered with junipers and pinyons as part of the pinyon-juniper woodland ecotone. The Colorado Pinyon and Utah juniper–(Juniperus osteosperma), found here in sections of Chino Valley are partially located in the Prescott National Forest. Juniper trees are often harvested for firewood, by federal permit.
