= Cedar Bench Wilderness =

Protected area in Yavapai County, Arizona

- IUCN category Ib (wilderness area)
- Location within the United States
- Location: Yavapai County, Arizona, United States
- Nearest town: Camp Verde, AZ
- Coordinates: 34°25′39″N 111°52′2″W
- Area: 16,009 acres (65 km^{2})
- Established: 1984
- Governing body: U.S. Forest Service

Cedar Bench Wilderness is a protected wilderness area in the Prescott National Forest in the U.S. state of Arizona. Established in 1984 under the Arizona Wilderness Act, the area protects the large "bench" that divides the Agua Fria and Verde River drainages. Elevations range from 4,500 feet (1,371 m) to 6,700 feet (2,042 m) with vegetation that includes saguaro cactus along the Verde river to chaparral to smaller amounts of pinyon pine and Utah juniper along the high points.

== See also ==
- List of Arizona Wilderness Areas
- List of U.S. Wilderness Areas
