= Agua Fria National Monument =

Protected area in Arizona, United States

- IUCN category V (protected landscape/seascape)
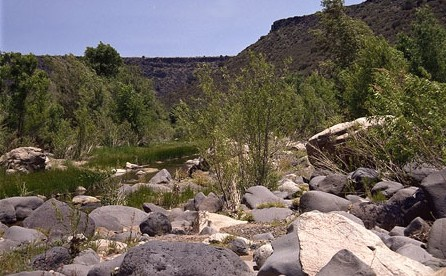

- Location within the United States Location within Arizona
- Interactive map of Agua Fria National Monument
- Location: Yavapai County, Arizona, United States
- Nearest city: Phoenix, Arizona
- Coordinates: 34°9′15″N 112°4′35″W
- Area: 72,344 acres (113.038 sq mi; 292.77 km^{2})
- Created: January 11, 2000
- Visitors: 80,000+ (in 2011)
- Governing body: Bureau of Land Management
- Website: www.blm.gov/visit/agua-fria

U.S. National Monument
- Designated: January 11, 2000

Agua Fria National Monument is in the U.S. state of Arizona, approximately 40 miles (64 km) north of downtown Phoenix, Arizona. Created by Presidential proclamation on January 11, 2000, the 72,344-acre (113 sq mi; 293 km^{2}) monument is managed by the Bureau of Land Management, an agency within the U.S. Department of the Interior. The Bureau of Land Management already managed the lands; however, under monument status the level of protection and preservation of resources within the new monument have been enhanced.

The monument is a unit of the BLM's National Landscape Conservation System. Over 450 distinct Native American structures have been recorded in the monument, some of large pueblos containing more than 100 rooms each. The enhanced protection status also provides greater habitat protection for the numerous plant and animal communities.

== Antiquities ==
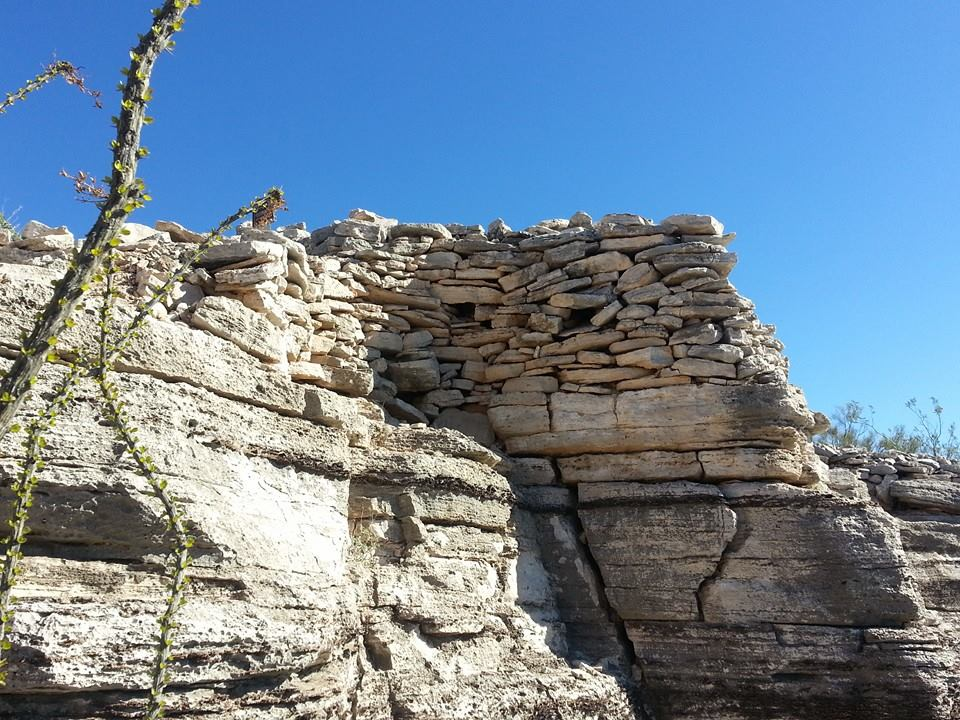
Ruins of a village built by Puebloans about 1000 years ago on top of Indian Mesa. This is part of the wall of the fort that surrounded the village. The holes in the wall are viewing holes so the defenders can view the only path to the top. There are several branches of an ocotillo plant in the foreground.

Petroglyphs are scattered across the numerous puebloan ruins, which were built between 1250 and 1450 C.E. when several thousand Native Americans, known as the Perry Mesa Tradition, inhabited the region. The petroglyphs depict animals, geometric figures and abstract symbols and are found by the thousands. Numerous ruins of agricultural terraces and irrigation devices indicate that farming was widespread during this period. Other historical entities that are found include 19th century mining features and Basque sheep camps.

== Natural history ==
Situated between 2,150 feet (660 m) and 4,600 feet (1,400 m) in elevation, the monument is primarily composed of semi-desert grassland but also contains extensive riparian stands of cottonwoods and willows which are tied to the Agua Fria River. More than 140 bird species have been recorded at the monument.

Notable species of reptiles and amphibians, including the leopard frog, the garter snake, and the desert tortoise, can be seen at the monument. Mammals such as the pronghorn, mule deer, white-tail deer and javelina are relatively common. The elk, black bears and mountain lions are also found in the monument, but are much less common. Native fish including the longfin dace, the Gila mountain sucker, speckled dace, and three endangered native fish including the Gila intermedia, charalito, and desert pupfish exist in the 129-mile (208 km)-long Agua Fria River and its tributaries.

In late 2004, the BLM and the Sierra Club helped spark the formation of the Friends of the Agua Fria National Monument, a non-profit organization created to assist the federal agency in monument protection, management, and outreach.

== See also ==
- List of national monuments of the United States
