= Verde National Forest =

Former National Forest name

Coordinates: 34.69°N 112.10°W

Verde National Forest was established by the U.S. Forest Service in Arizona on December 30, 1907, with 721,780 acres (2,920.9 km^{2}). On July 1, 1908, the forest was combined with Prescott National Forest and the name was discontinued.
