= Santa Maria Mountains =

Landform in Yavapai County, Arizona

- Location within Arizona

Highest point
- Peak: Hyde Creek Mountain, Santa Maria Mountains-(center-SW)
- Elevation: 7,272 ft (2,217 m)
- Coordinates: 34°50′07″N 112°55′07″W

Dimensions
- Length: 16 mi (26 km) NW-SE

Geography
- Country: United States
- State: Arizona
- Region: Arizona transition zone
- County: Yavapai
- Communities: Tucker, Chino Valley, Bagdad and Seligman
- Range coordinates: 34°51′24″N 112°54′34″W
- Borders on: Mohon Mountains, Juniper Mountains, Chino Valley, Williamson Valley, Sierra Prieta and Cornell Mountains

The Santa Maria Mountains are a 16-mi (26 km) long mountain range in central-northwest Arizona, and in northwest Yavapai County. The range lies in a region of mesas and mountain ranges in the northwest of Arizona's transition zone. The Santa Maria Mountains lie east of the transition zone's northwest perimeter, the parallel Aquarius and Mohon Mountains.

The townsite of Tucker, Arizona lies 8 mi east, and is located just west of Chino Valley, AZ. Tucker lies in the center-east of the small Williamson Valley.

== Description ==
The Santa Maria Mountains are northwest–southeast trending and attached to a smaller range on its south, the Cornell Mountains. The small Chino Valley north-trending tributary Williamson Valley Wash and Valley, border the range's east. Numerous hills, peaks, mesas, and flats are in the region. North Fork Creek and Juniper Mesa-(part of southeast Juniper Mountains), border north. Tailholt Mesa, borders southeast, east of the Cornell Mountains.

On the range's northwest, Sawmill and Johnson Flats merge west into the Mohon Mountains. Southwest are other various ridges and mesas, that are all part of smaller mountain areas just northeast of the mining district of Bagdad.

=== Mountain peaks ===
Various peaks are in the range. The northwest area has Bear Mountain, Janes Butte, and Dairy Mountain, 7,165 feet (2,184 m). The center-south of the range is at Granite Knob, 6,625 feet (2,019 m). Bald Mountain, 5,900 feet (1,798 m), is northeast; just southwest, closer to the Cornell Mountains, is the range highpoint, Hyde Creek Mountain, 7,272 feet (2,217 m). The Apache Creek Wilderness is adjacent north of Hyde Creek Mountain.

== Notes ==
- Lucchitta, Ivo (2001). "Hiking Arizona's Geology" Part 2, Arizona Transition Zone, Graphic, w/text, Hikes 18–26, Mountaineers's Books. 272 pages, 41 Hikes. (Transition zone: Hikes 18–26, pp. 143–182.) (softcover, ISBN 0-89886-730-4)
