= Revel Guest =

British filmmaker (1931–2022)

Revel Sarah Guest OBE (14 September 1931 – 8 June 2022) was a British filmmaker, journalist, author and farmer who was Chair Emeritus of the Hay Festival.

== Early life and career ==
Guest was born in London on 14 September 1931. A politician's daughter (her father, Oscar Guest and his three brothers served as MPs with their cousin, Sir Winston Churchill), she was educated at Bedgebury School and the London School of Economics where she read politics and philosophy.

After working as a secretary for Jo Grimond in the House of Commons, she stood as the then youngest ever female Conservative parliamentary candidate (for Swansea East) in the 1955 election. She then became assistant editor of Lady Rhondda's Time and Tide. In 1957, she left to become press officer for the UK Council of the European Movement, and later wrote a syndicated column from America for the Westminster Press.

== Film and television ==
In 1960 Guest joined the BBC’s Panorama and became its first female producer/director, working with Richard Dimbleby, Robin Day and John Morgan, making programmes on domestic issues and international affairs before moving on to direct and produce a series of profiles of political leaders including Hugh Gaitskell, Harold Macmillan and Edward Heath.

She left the BBC in 1966 to become Head of the European Bureau of the Ford Foundation's two-year experiment in US public broadcasting, Public Broadcasting Laboratory which led to the creation of PBS. In 1968, with her husband, she formed Transatlantic Films, the first truly independent documentary film company to co-produce quality films for the international television market.

=== Transatlantic films ===
Since its creation, Transatlantic has produced more than one hundred and fifty films and series, working in co-production with the BBC, Channel 4 and other major UK broadcasters, as well as with leading TV networks in the United States, Canada, Australia and Europe – Discovery Channel, TLC, Animal Planet, A&E, Group W, Metromedia, PBS, ABC, TVNZ, TF1, La Cinquième, NDR and ORF etc.

=== Direction and production ===
Guest's directing and producing credits include: London Rock and Black, White and Blues, co-productions with the BBC and Metromedia; In Search of Paradise, a co-production with TF1 in France, Channel 4 in the UK and TVOntario in Canada; 4 American Composers, a series of four one-hour films directed by Peter Greenaway; Plácido Domingo, A Year in the Life of an Opera Singer, also for Channel 4. Then followed three major award-winning series: The Horse in Sport (8 x 50'), Greek Fire (90 x 25'), and History's Turning Points, a 26 part series which won the Prix de Basle, Barcelona Bienale for Culture and the Prix Stendhal.

Trailblazers (26 x 50') was the highest-rated series on the Travel Channel in the US, a co-production with Discovery Channel Europe. Horse Tales (26 x 25') was the first UK/Canadian Treaty Co-Production of a factual television documentary series. Three Gorges (2 x 60') was an acclaimed documentary on the construction and completion of the largest dam in the world along with the efforts of the Chinese government to save their antiquities from the rising waters. The Science of Love (3x60'), Extreme Body Parts (6 x 60') and Sleep and Dreams (2 x 60') were all co-produced with Discovery Health in the United States, Great North and Alliance Atlantis in Canada, S4C in Wales and NDR in Germany. Legends of the Living Dead (4 x 50') was a co-production with the Travel Channel, S4C and S4C International and most recently, she co-produced Return to the Three Gorges (1 x 90') a Discovery Channel special made in co-production with West Beach Productions.

Her drama credits include producing and directing Man in a Fog for Channel 4, a psychological drama starring Tim Piggot Smith, and later produced Belzoni, a three-part drama series, also for Channel 4. Her feature film Makin' it, directed by Simon Hartog, was chosen as the British entry for the Director Fortnight at Cannes Film Festival in 1972. More recently she was Executive Producer of the BAFTA and The Oscar nominated 2011 feature film, War Horse (film), directed by Steven Spielberg.

Guest was also Executive Producer of "Covent Garden Pioneer" – a joint venture between the Royal Opera House and the Japanese electronic company, Pioneer. During this time she produced fifteen full-length opera and ballet productions from Covent Garden in co-production with the BBC, Channel 4 and NHK.

== Literature ==
Guest co-authored two books and had been Chair of the Hay Festival for over twenty years, and later served as Chair Emeritus.

== Personal life ==
Guest was married to American international lawyer Robert Albert, the couple having met while Guest was working on a documentary about race in the United States for Panorama in 1963. They lived and farmed in Wales, where she also was Master of Fox Hounds (MFH) of the Golden Valley and bred and trained event horses with Lesley Law. She had two children, Justin, currently Director for Wales of the National Trust, and Corisande, writer, potter and managing partner of the family farm, Cabalva. Guest died on 8 June 2022, at the age of 90.
