= Chino Valley Unified School District (Arizona) =

School district in Yavapai County, Arizona

Coordinates: 34°44′46.5″N 112°27′14.5″W

Address
- 650 East Center Street Chino Valley, Arizona, 86323; United States

District information
- Type: Public
- Grades: PreK–12
- NCES District ID: 0400003

Students and staff
- Students: 2,206
- Teachers: 109.0
- Staff: 148.11
- Student–teacher ratio: 20.24

Other information
- Website: www.chinovalleyschools.com

In Arizona, the Chino Valley Unified School District #51 is a school district in Yavapai County, Arizona.

== Geography ==
It includes most the town of Chino Valley, along with a majority of the Paulden census-designated place, a small section of Prescott, and a part of the Williamson CDP. It also includes unincorporated area of Drake.

It operates Chino Valley High School, Heritage Middle School, Del Rio Elementary School, and Territorial Elementary School.
