= Pine Mountain Wilderness =

Protected area in Yavapai County, Arizona

- IUCN category Ib (wilderness area)
- Location within the United States
- Location: Yavapai County, Arizona, United States
- Nearest city: Cordes Lakes, AZ
- Coordinates: 34.1435°N 111.8382°W
- Area: 20,053 acres (81 km^{2})
- Established: 1972
- Governing body: U.S. Forest Service

Pine Mountain Wilderness is a protected wilderness area managed by the Prescott National Forest in the U.S. state of Arizona. Pine Mountain is the high point of the Verde River Rim at 6,814 feet (2076 m) and provides an excellent viewing to the northeast of the Wild and Scenic Verde while surrounded by ponderosa pine and Douglas fir.

Sharing a boundary with the Tonto National Forest this area is the southernmost wilderness in Prescott National Forest and holds six hiking trails.

== See also ==
- List of Arizona Wilderness Areas
- List of U.S. Wilderness Areas
