= Prescott National Forest =

Protected area in north central Arizona

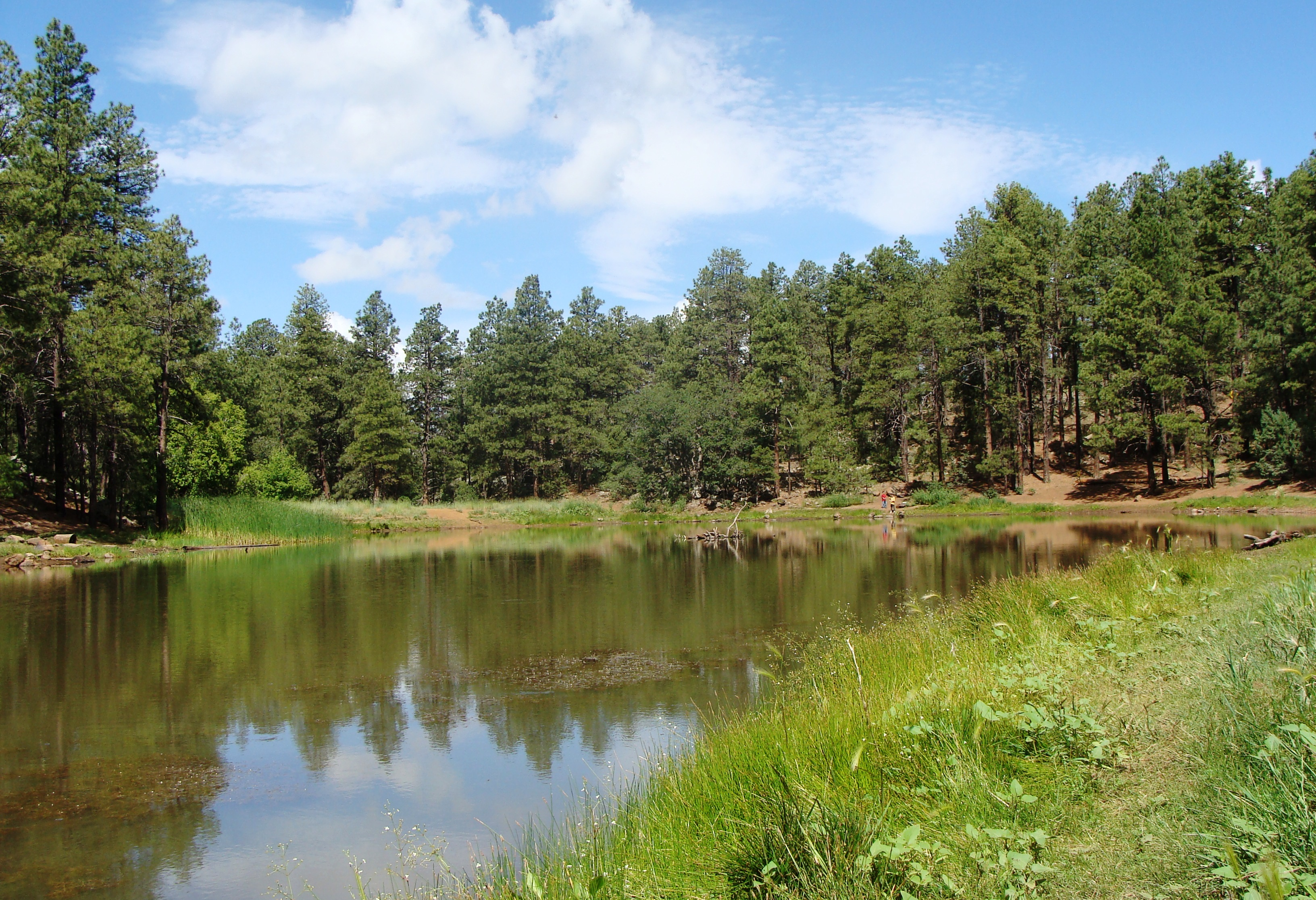

- Location within the United States
- Location: Yavapai County and Coconino County, Arizona, US
- Nearest city: Prescott, AZ
- Coordinates: 34°37′N 112°37′W
- Area: 1,250,000 acres (5,100 km^{2})
- Established: 1908
- Governing body: U.S. Forest Service
- Website: Prescott National Forest

The Prescott National Forest is a 1.25 million-acre (510,000 ha) United States National Forest located in north central Arizona in the vicinity of Prescott. The forest is located in the mountains southwest of Flagstaff and north of Phoenix in Yavapai County, with a small portion (about 3.5 percent) extending into southwestern Coconino County.

The Forest Service divides the forest into 3 administrative districts. The northern section of the forest is the Chino Valley Ranger District, the southwest section is the Bradshaw Ranger District, and the southeast section is the Verde Ranger District. Central administrative offices are in Prescott with local ranger district offices in Camp Verde, Chino Valley, and Prescott.

== Wilderness ==
There are eight designated wilderness areas comprising more than 104,000 acres (421 km^{2}), located entirely or partially within the Prescott National Forest. These are:

- Apache Creek Wilderness (Chino Valley District)
- Castle Creek Wilderness (Bradshaw District)
- Cedar Bench Wilderness (Verde District)
- Granite Mountain Wilderness (Bradshaw District)
- Juniper Mesa Wilderness (Chino Valley District)
- Pine Mountain Wilderness (Verde District) (mostly in Tonto NF)
- Sycamore Canyon Wilderness (Chino Valley District) (partly in Coconino NF and in Kaibab NF)
- Woodchute Wilderness (Verde District)

== Campgrounds ==
The following table(s) display all public campgrounds within the Prescott National Forest.

=== Dispersed campsites ===
Dispersed campsites are undeveloped and no facilities such as trash collection, water and toilets are available. Recommended for experienced campers.

Dispersed camping is allowed in wide areas of the Forest except in the Prescott Basin area. Dispersed campsite locations in that area are listed below.

Campsite locations	Number of campsites	Campsite numbers
FDR 23 – Enchanted Forest Road	11	1–11
FDR 30 – Bannie Mine Road	13	1–13
C 56 – Senator Highway	7	1–7
FDR 79 – Tritle Mountain Road	16	1–16
FDR 80 – Sundance Road	6	1–6
FDR 9406L – Pipeline Road	5	1–5
C 101 – Groom Creek Cut Off Road	14	1–14
FDR 64 – Marapai Road	7	1–7
C64 – Copper Basin Road	5	1–5
FDR 51 – Pott's Creek	8	1–8

=== Family campgrounds ===
Developed campsites designed to accommodate families of 5-10 (maximum) per site.

Campground	District	Elevation	Open season	Sites	Fee	Features
Alto Pit OHV Campground	Bradshaw	6,200	All Year	11	$10 Single $20 Double $3 Day Use	Overnight Camping and Day Use
Groom Creek Horse Camp	Bradshaw	6,000	05/01 – 10/31	36	$10	Equestrian campground (horse required), trail access, drinking water, 12 corrals, 2 group sites
Hazlett Hollow	Bradshaw	6,000	05/01 – 10/01	15	$6	Hiking, remote area, drinking water
Hilltop	Bradshaw	5,800	03/30 – 10/31	38	$18	Hiking, fishing, gold panning, drinking water
Lower Wolf Creek	Bradshaw	6,000	05/01 – 10/31	20	$6	Hiking, no drinking water
Lynx Lake	Bradshaw	5,600	04/1-10/31	36	$18	Lake, boating, fishing, gold panning, hiking, drinking water, no swimming
Mingus Mountain (Black Hills)	Verde	7,600	05/01 – 10/31	25	$6	Loop B 6 sites ($6.00), Loop E 19 RV sites ($6.00), hiking, scenic views, no drinking water
Potato Patch	Verde	7,000	05/01 – 10/31	40	$10/$15	Loop A 28 sites ($10.00), Loop B 12 RV sites ($15.00), hiking, close to wilderness, drinking water
Powell Springs	Verde	5,300	All year	10	$6	No drinking water
White Spar	Bradshaw	5,700	All year	60	$10	Drinking water, 11 sites open all year
Yavapai	Bradshaw	5,600	All year	25	$10	Hiking, drinking water, near Granite Lake

* Pricing and Open Season information current as of Monday, 3 December 2007 at 18:27:06 EST; please refer to the official Forest Service website for up-to-date information as it is subject to change.

== History ==
The Prescott Forest Reserve was established by the United States General Land Office on May 10, 1898. It was transferred to the U.S. Forest Service in 1906 and became a National Forest on March 4, 1907. On July 1, 1908, it absorbed Verde National Forest, and on October 22, 1934, it absorbed Tusayan National Forest.

== See also ==
- List of national forests of the United States
