= Justin Albert =

British filmmaker

Justin Albert OBE
- Born: 19 February 1965 (age 61); London, England
- Occupations: Conservationist; educationalist; broadcaster; filmmaker

Justin Thomas Albert OBE (born 19 February 1965) is a conservationist, educationalist, broadcaster, sustainable food and farming advocate, filmmaker, and the former head of National Trust for Wales.

He is Vice President of Hay Festival and Member of the Hay Festival Council. In earlier years, he was a history and environmental filmmaker and television executive. He is the son of lawyer Robert Alan Albert and filmmaker Revel Sarah Guest.

He has a degree in law from the University of Buckingham and an honorary master's in arts from the University of Wales.

== Career ==
Albert was Director of Wales for The National Trust in 2011 - 2021. The National Trust is the largest volunteer conservation charity in Europe. National Trust Wales is the largest landowner in Wales, and it protects numerous castles and historic buildings, thousands of acres of wilderness and farmland, and 200 miles of Welsh coastline.

Albert transitioned on from his role at the National Trust in 2021 to work with Sir Tim Smit from The Eden Project and Fraser White of The Green School to lead a globally focused, UK-based agri-tech R&D lab that incubates and invests in circular food and materials production based in Cornwall.

He has been a vice president of Hay Festival since 2005. He is a Trustee of Hay Castle Trust, and a member of the Welsh Government Tourism Advisory Board. In 2017 he became director and trustee of Michael Morphurgo's Farms For City Children charity. He is also director and trustee for the Centre for Advanced Welsh and Celtic Studies, and a founding trustee of the Hay Castle Trust.

== Film and television ==
Albert was a documentary filmmaker and company director of Transatlantic Films. He has directed and produced over 60 documentaries, including: History's Turning Points (1995); Three Gorges: The Biggest Dam in the World (1998); Trailblazers (1998); Lost Treasures of the Ancient World: Ancient China (2000); China's Mega Dam (2006).

He was executive vice president at Mandalay Media Arts in Los Angeles 1999. He joined Discovery Communications Digital Networks as a vice president in 1999, and became head of production at Animal Planet in 2001. He founded West Beach Television, an independent production company, in 2003, and in 2008, he became general manager of Horse and Country TV.

== Personal life ==
Albert married Hester Amanda Jessica Gray, daughter of restaurateur Rose Gray, in 1991, and was divorced in 1997. He married Nancy Burns Lavin, a former television executive and building preservation charity director, in 2000. They live in Wales. He has three children.

== Awards ==
Albert was appointed Officer of the Order of the British Empire (OBE) in the 2021 Birthday Honours for services to the historic and natural environment in Wales.
