= Agua Fria River =

Stream in Arizona, United States

Agua Fria River Tributary to Gila River
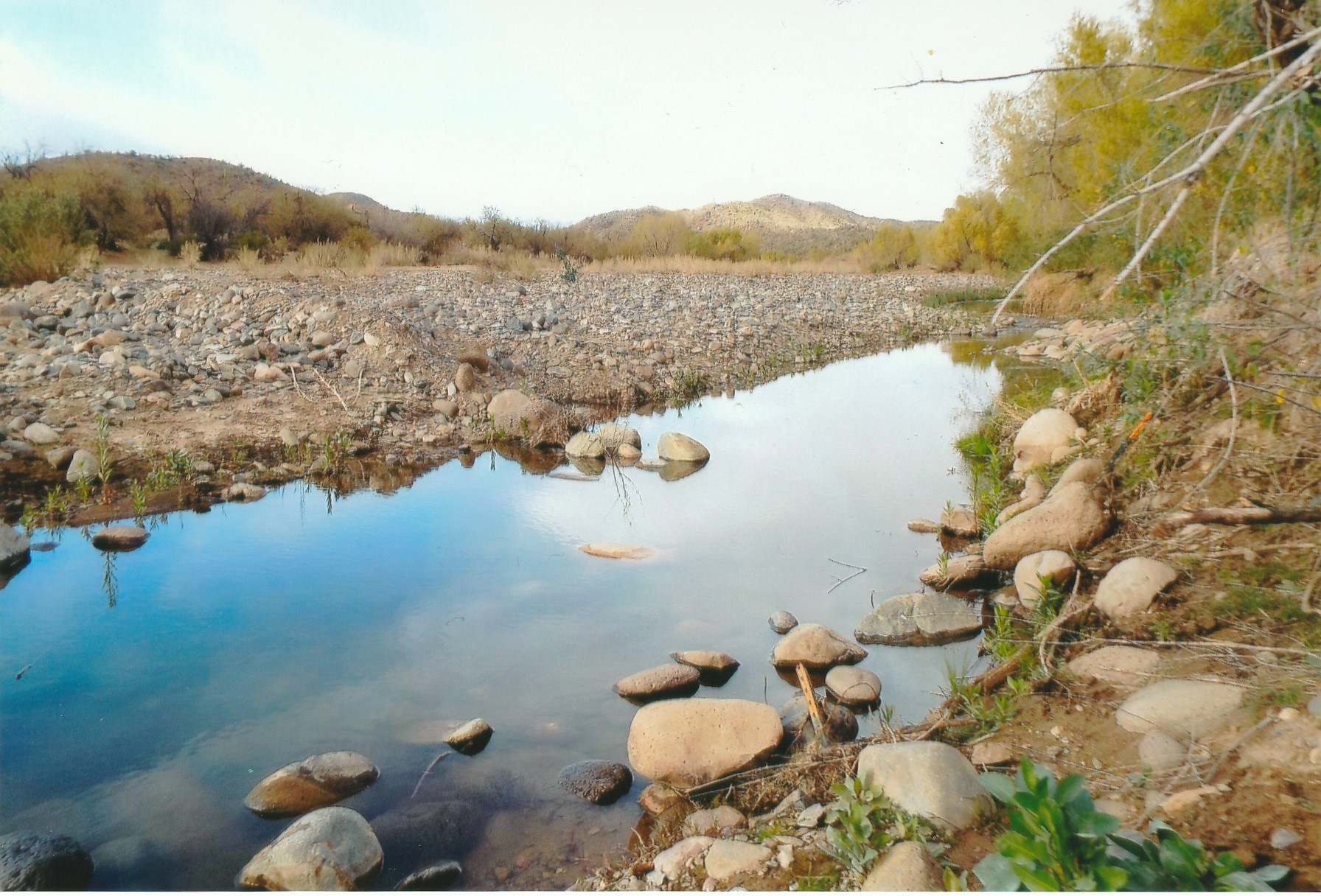
- The Agua Fria River on the border edge of Gillett, Arizona.

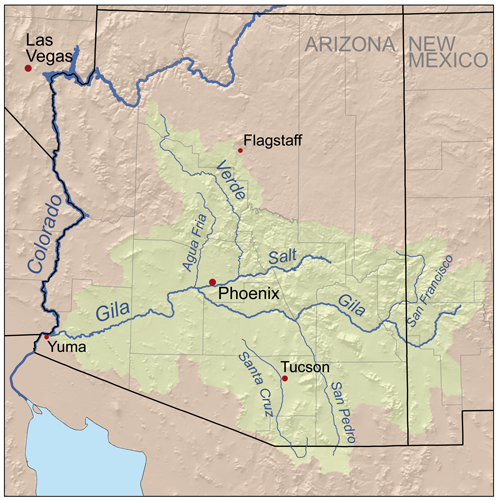
- A map of the Gila River watershed, including the Agua Fria River

Location
- Country: United States
- State: Arizona
- County: Maricopa; Yavapai

Physical characteristics
- Source: Granite Creek divide
  - location: about 1.5 miles northeast of Granite Dells, Arizona
  - coordinates: 34°37′00″N 112°23′56″W
  - elevation: 5,215 ft (1,590 m)
- Mouth: Gila River
  - location: about 1 mile south of Goodyear, Arizona
  - coordinates: 33°23′22″N 112°21′53″W
  - elevation: 912 ft (278 m)
- Length: 128.51 mi (206.82 km)
- Basin size: 2,433.70 square miles (6,303.3 km^{2})
- Discharge
  - location: Gila River
  - average: 157.28 cu ft/s (4.454 m^{3}/s) at mouth with Gila River

Basin features
- Progression: Gila River → Colorado River → Gulf of California
- River system: Colorado River
- Tributaries
  - left: Coyote Wash, Yarber Wash, Ash Creek, Sycamore Creek, Black Hill Wash, Indian Creek, Silver Creek, Bishop Creek, Tank Creek, Lonny Creek, Squaw Creek, Little Squaw Creek, New River
  - right: Lynx Creek, Clipper Wash, Big Bug Creek, Badger Spring Wash, Black Canyon Creek, Slate Creek, Boulder Creek, Tule Creek, Humbug Creek, French Creek, Cottonwood Creek, Morgan City Wash, Caterpillar Tank Wash, Twin Butcher Wash
- Waterbodies: Lake Pleasant
- Bridges: Beecher Loop, Glassford Hill Road, Talbot Drive, Kilkenny Place (x2), Bronco Lane, Gallery Lane, Bronco Lane, Roundup Drive, Cattletrack Drive, Robert Road, Lakeshore Drive, Fain Road, Old Fain Road, Bradshaw Mountain Road, AZ 169, Prescott Street, Agua Fria Ranch Road, Arizona Hunt Club Road, Old Sycamore Road, I-17, Hammock Ranch Road, EZ Ranch Pit Road, Bloody Basin Road E, Perry Road, Squaw Valley Road, I-17, Old Black Canyon Highway, AZ 74, W Carefree Highway, AZ 303, N 107th Avenue, Happy Valley Parkway, W Rose Garden Lane, W Bell Road, US 60, W Glendale Avenue, W Camelback Road, W Indian School Road, W McDowell Road, I-10, AZ 85, W Lower Buckeye Road

The Agua Fria River (Spanish for "cold water") is a 120-mile (190 km) long intermittent stream which flows generally south from 20 miles (32 km) east-northeast of Prescott in the U.S. state of Arizona. Prescott draws much of its municipal water supply from the upper Agua Fria watershed.

The Agua Fria runs through the Agua Fria National Monument. The river then flows through a small canyon called "Black Canyon" into Lake Pleasant, a popular recreation area near Peoria, Arizona. There is a large "Black Canyon" on the Colorado River along the Arizona–Nevada border.

During rainy weather and at times when water is flowing in the intermittent Agua Fria River, it discharges into the Gila River, which also only flows during wet periods of the year.

The Central Arizona Water Conservation District of the Central Arizona Project operates the Agua Fria Recharge Project, which is about 4 miles (6.4 km) south of the New Waddell Dam. It serves to recharge underground aquifers in this area, and ends at Lake Pleasant, Phoenix.

== Variant names ==
According to the Geographic Names Information System, it has also been known historically as:

- Agua Fria Creek
- Agua Frie

== Course ==
The Agua Fria River rises about 1.5 miles northeast of Granite Dells, Arizona and then flows south to join the Gila River about 1 mile south of Goodyear, Arizona.

== Watershed ==
Agua Fria River drains 2,433.70 square miles (6,303.3 km^{2}) of area, receives about 16.4 in/year of precipitation, has a wetness index of 415.05, and is about 11% forested.

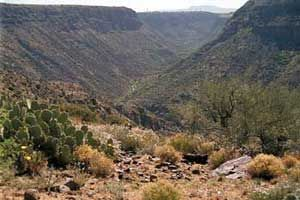
Agua Fria Canyon, near Richinbar Mine, Agua Fria National Monument

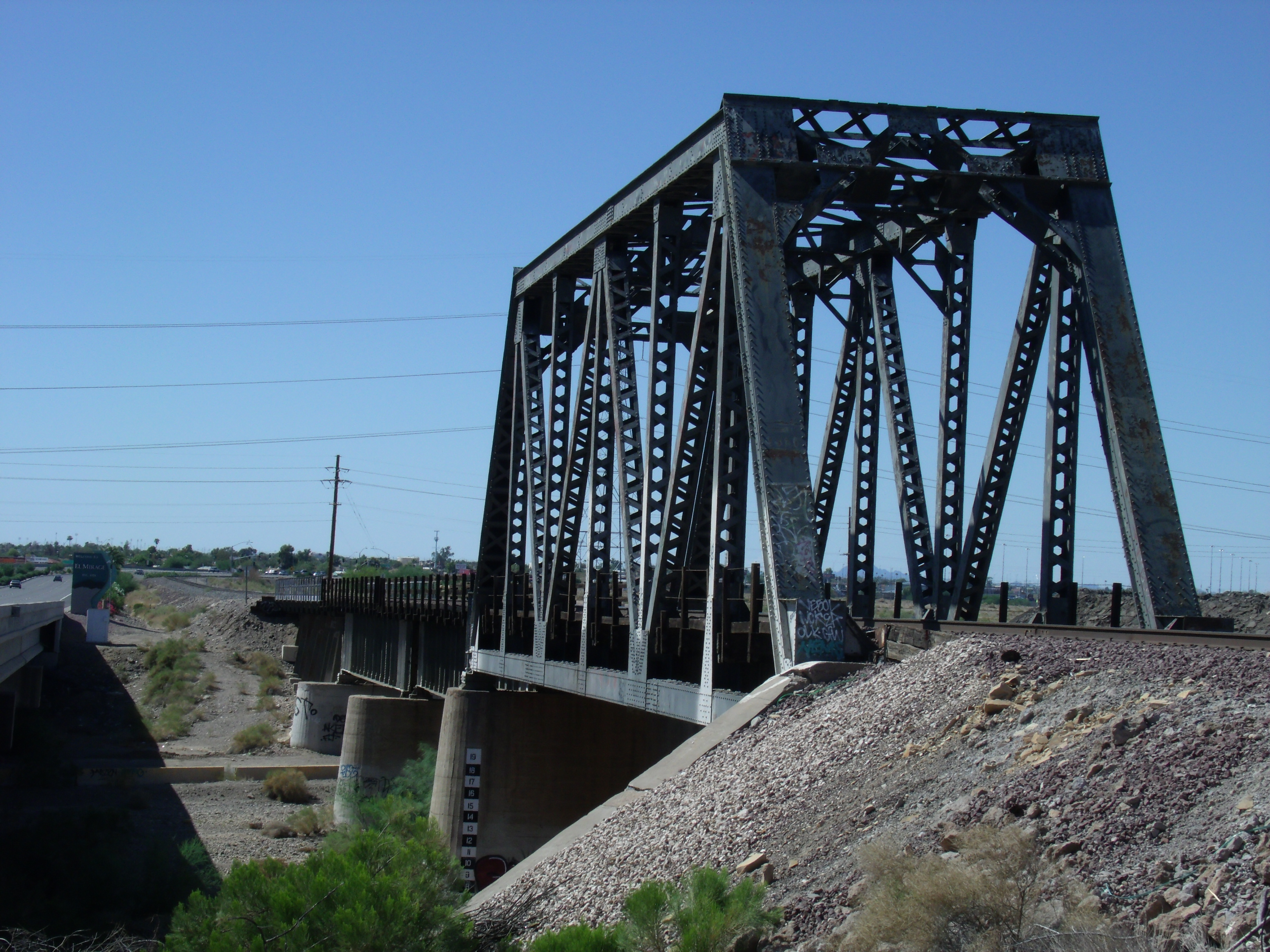
The historic Agua Fria River Bridge was built by the Santa Fe Railroad over the Agua Fria River in 1895. It is located on the right side of Grand Avenue traveling from Phoenix to Wickenburg, close to 111th Ave. in El Mirage.

== See also ==
- List of rivers of Arizona
- Indian Mesa
