= Granite Mountain (Arizona) =

Mountain in Yavapai County, Arizona, United States

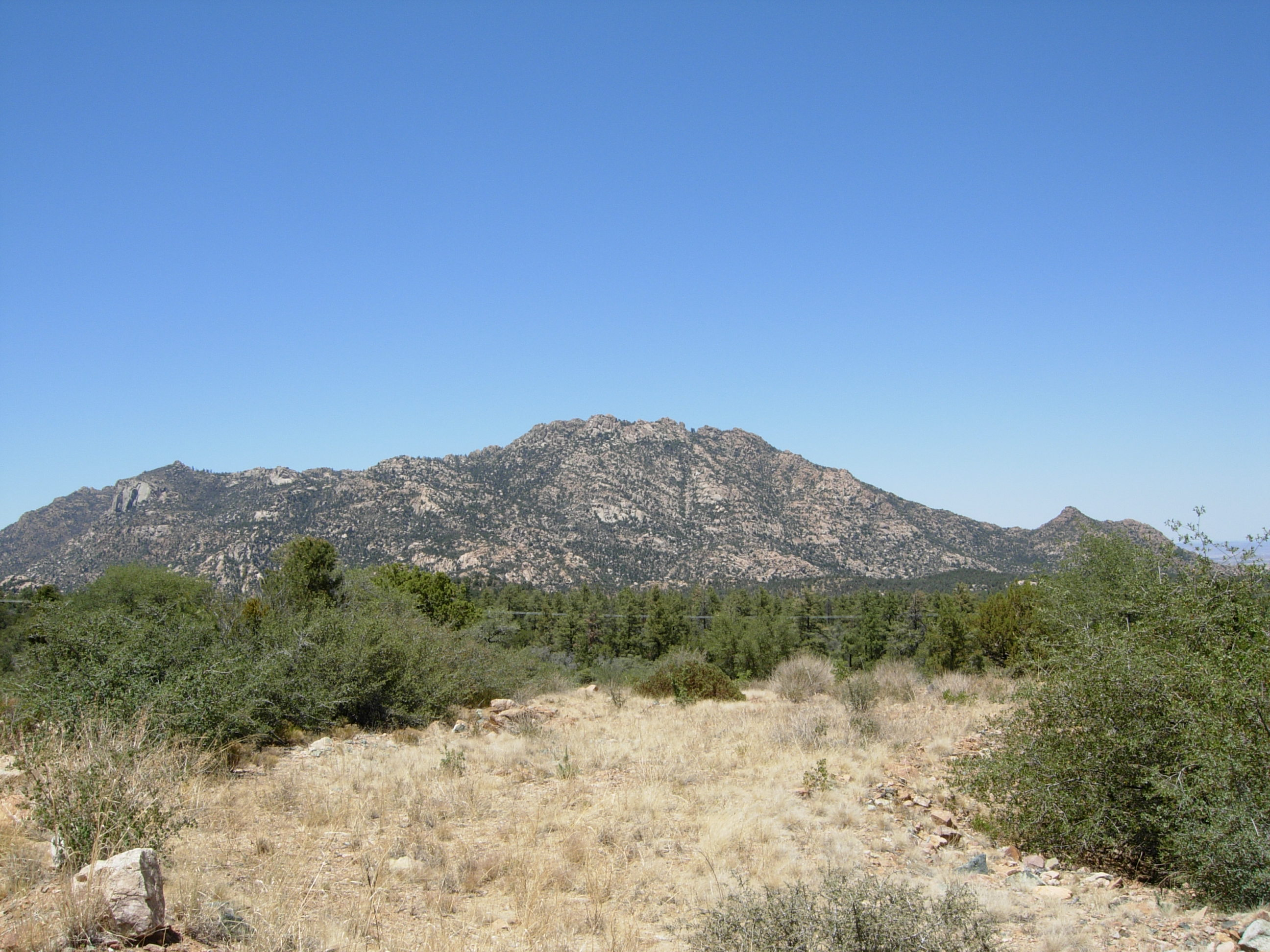

Highest point
- Elevation: 7,628 ft (2,325 m) NAVD 88
- Prominence: 1,666 ft (508 m)
- Coordinates: 34°38′16″N 112°33′13″W

Naming
- Native name: ʼWi:kvte:wa (Yavapai)

Geography
- Location within Arizona
- Location: Yavapai County, Arizona, U.S.
- Parent range: Sierra Prieta
- Topo map: USGS Jerome Canyon

Geology
- Rock age: Proterozoic
- Mountain type: Granite

Climbing
- Easiest route: rock climb

Granite Mountain (Yavapai: ʼWi:kvte:wa) is a 7,628-foot (2,325 m) mountain located in Yavapai County, Arizona that covers roughly 12 square miles (31 km^{2}). It was once known as Mount Gurley, for the first governor of the Arizona Territory, John A. Gurley. Its southwest face has a sheer granite cliff approximately 500 feet (150 m) high that is one of the best locations for rock climbing in the state of Arizona. It is located in the Granite Mountain Wilderness, which is managed as a part of the Prescott National Forest. The mountain stands at the northern end of the Sierra Prietas, and borders Skull Valley on the west, on the northwest by the Santa Maria Mountains, and east by the Williamson Valley.

== Geology ==
Granite Mountain is composed of Paleoproterozoic biotite granodiorite to granite that is known by geologist as the Mint Wash Granodiorite. The Mint Wash Granodiorite consists of medium to coarse-grained, weakly to strongly porphyritic granite with phenocrysts of gray to pink potassium feldspar up to 3 cm (1.2 in) in length and as much as eight percent biotite that is less than 8 mm (0.31 in) in size. This granite grades laterally into a fine grained, equigranular leucogranite with less than two percent biotite that is less than 2 mm (0.079 in) in size. The Mint Wash Granodiorite is almost everywhere undeformed. The porphyritic granite was named the Mint Wash Granodiorite by DeWitt and others for exposures along Mint Wash east of Granite Mountain. In composition, it is an alkali-calcic granodiorite to granite. Zircons from this granite yielded a U-Pb date of 1680 +/- 16 Ma.

The Mint Wash Granodiorite comprises the Mint Wash Pluton that has intruded into Paleoproterozoic sedimentary, metasedimentary, and metavolcanic rocks. On the northern end of Granite Mountain, these strata include weakly to moderately metamorphosed mudstone, siltstone, and fine-grained sandstone; basalt lava flows; ferruginous, white and dark laminated silica rock; infrequently laminated, epidote-silica rock; thinly interlayered silica and carbonate; laminated, highly platy, talc and/or pyrophyllite schist. Some of siliceous rock types are suspected of being primary chemical precipitates from Paleoproterozoic ocean water. The south end of the Mint Wash Pluton, has intruded into Paleoproterozoic mafic, metavolcanic rocks that include basalt lava flows and Paleoproterozoic intrusive rocks, hornblende-rich gabbro-norite, gabbro, and gabbro-diorite.

These sedimentary, metasedimentary, and metavolcanic rocks were deposited, deformed, and intruded contemporaneously with the Paleoproterozoic schists of the Vishnu Basement Rocks found in the Grand Canyon. The rocks intruded by the Mint Wash Granodiorite are also part of the same tectonostratigraphic terrane, Yavapai tectonic province. The rocks that are part of the Yavapai tectonic province and intruded by the Mint Wash Pluton formed in volcanic island arcs overlying one or more subduction systems, similar to modern volcanic arcs in the Aleutian Islands, the Philippines, and Indonesia. Then, granitic igneous rock, e.g. the Mint Wash Pluton, were later intruded into them when these volcanic arcs collided with and welded to Laurentia and each other ca. 1.7–1.66 Ga during the Yavapai and Mazatzal orogenies.

== Ecology ==
The biotic communities at Granite Mountain range from montane conifer forest and juniper pinyon woodland, to interior chaparral. Granite Mountain is a nesting site for the peregrine falcon (Falco peregrinus), and the climbing area on the south face is periodically closed to rock climbing, typically from February 1 until July 15 each year.

== See also ==
- List of mountains and hills of Arizona by height
