= Watson Lake (Arizona) =

Reservoir near Prescott, AZ

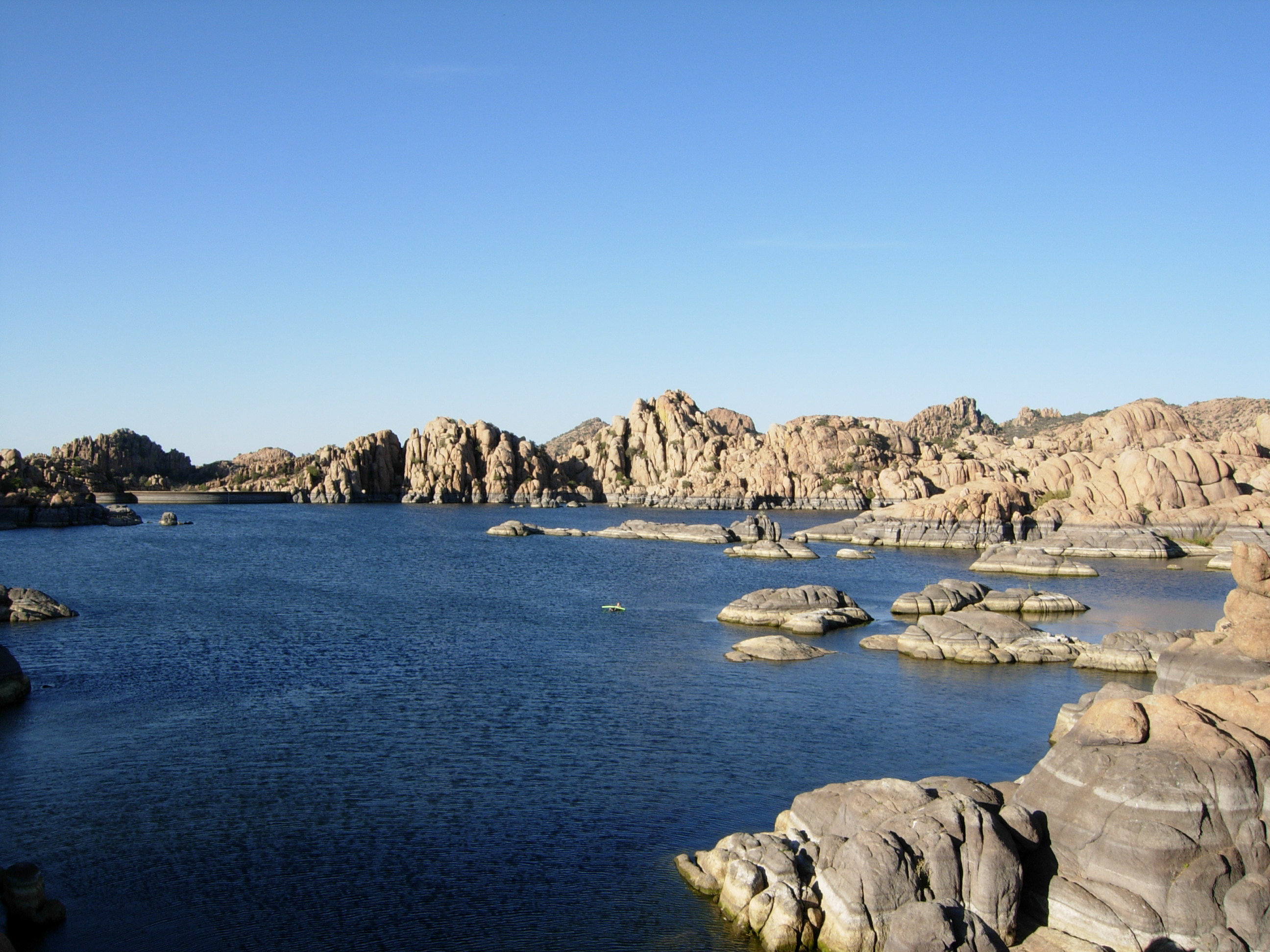
- The diversion dam can be seen on the left.

- Location within Arizona Location within the United States
- Location: Yavapai County, Arizona
- Coordinates: 34°35′13″N 112°25′24″W
- Type: reservoir
- Primary inflows: Granite Creek
- Primary outflows: Granite Creek
- Basin countries: United States
- Surface area: 70 acres (28 ha)
- Average depth: 50 ft (15 m)
- Surface elevation: 5,100 ft (1,600 m)

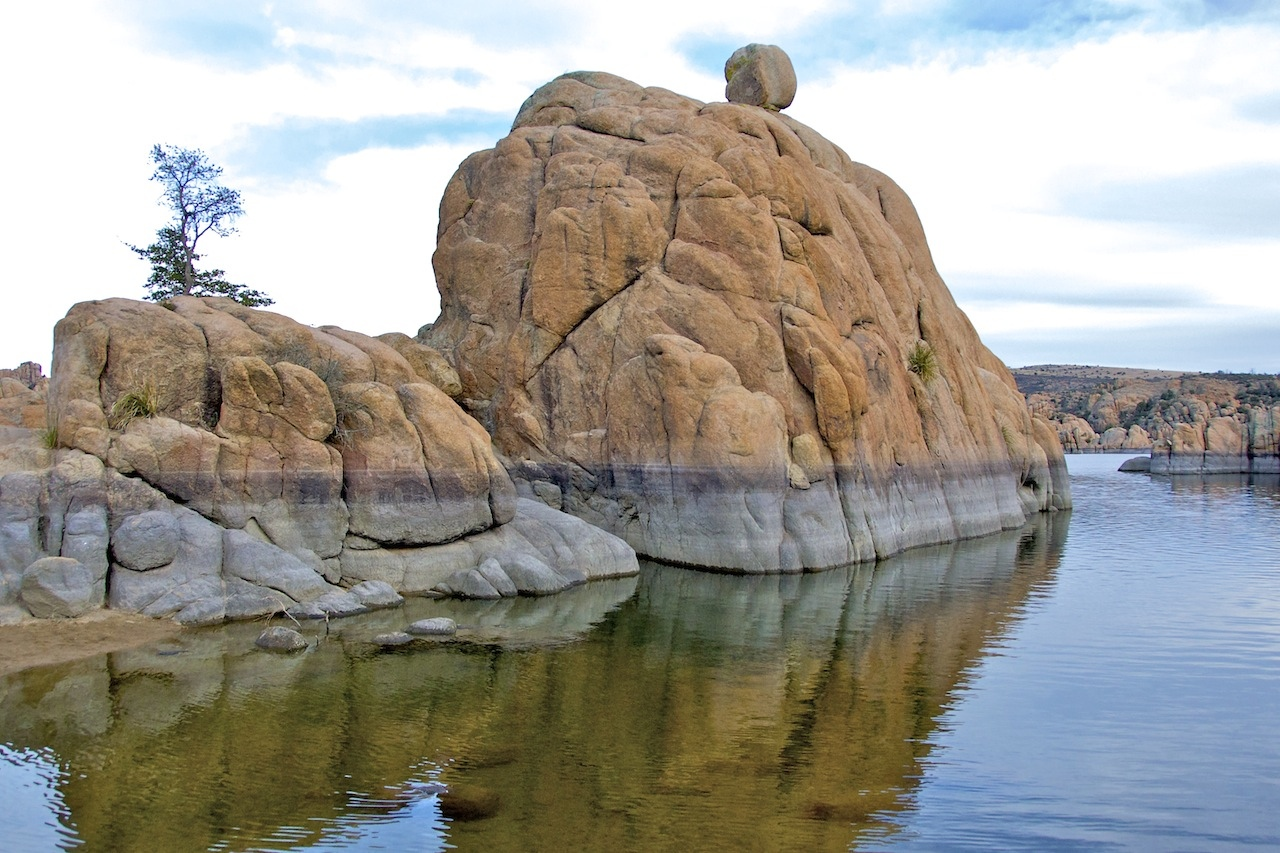
Watson Lake

Watson Lake is one of two reservoirs at the Granite Dells, in Prescott, Arizona, that was formed in the early 1900s when the Chino Valley Irrigation District built a dam on Granite Creek. The City of Prescott bought the reservoir and surrounding land in 1997 to preserve it as recreational land. Local rockclimbers use the granite cliffs above and adjacent to the lake for top-roping and lead climbing. The lake is also the home of TriCity Prep Rowing Crew, a local high school team and only rowing team in Northern Arizona.

== Fish species ==
- Largemouth bass
- Crappie
- Sunfish
- Channel catfish
- Carp
- Gila Trout

== See also ==
- List of lakes in Arizona
