= Granite Dells =

Geologic feature near Prescott, AZ

Coordinates: 34°36′53″N 112°25′06″W

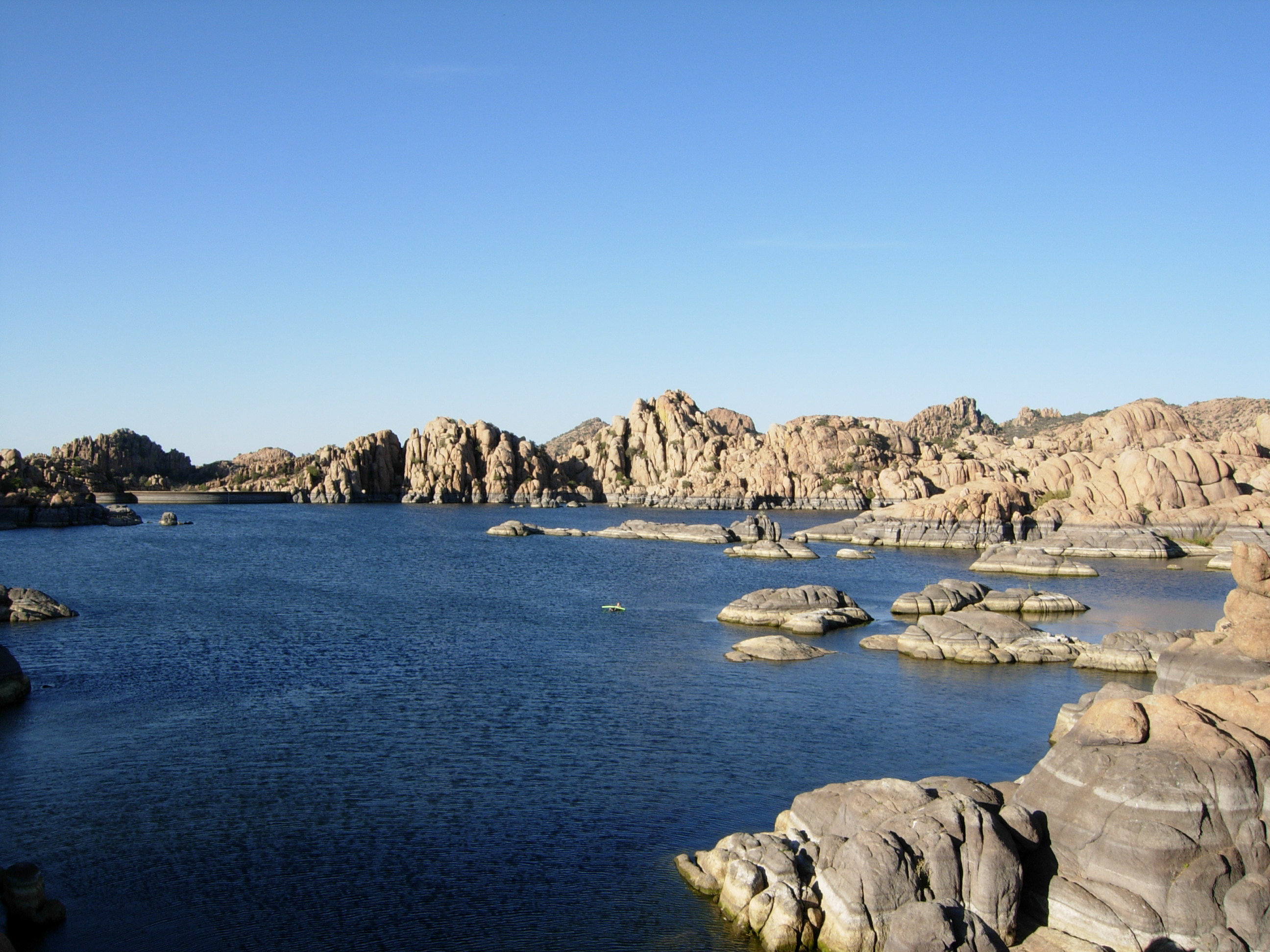
Watson Lake in the Granite Dells

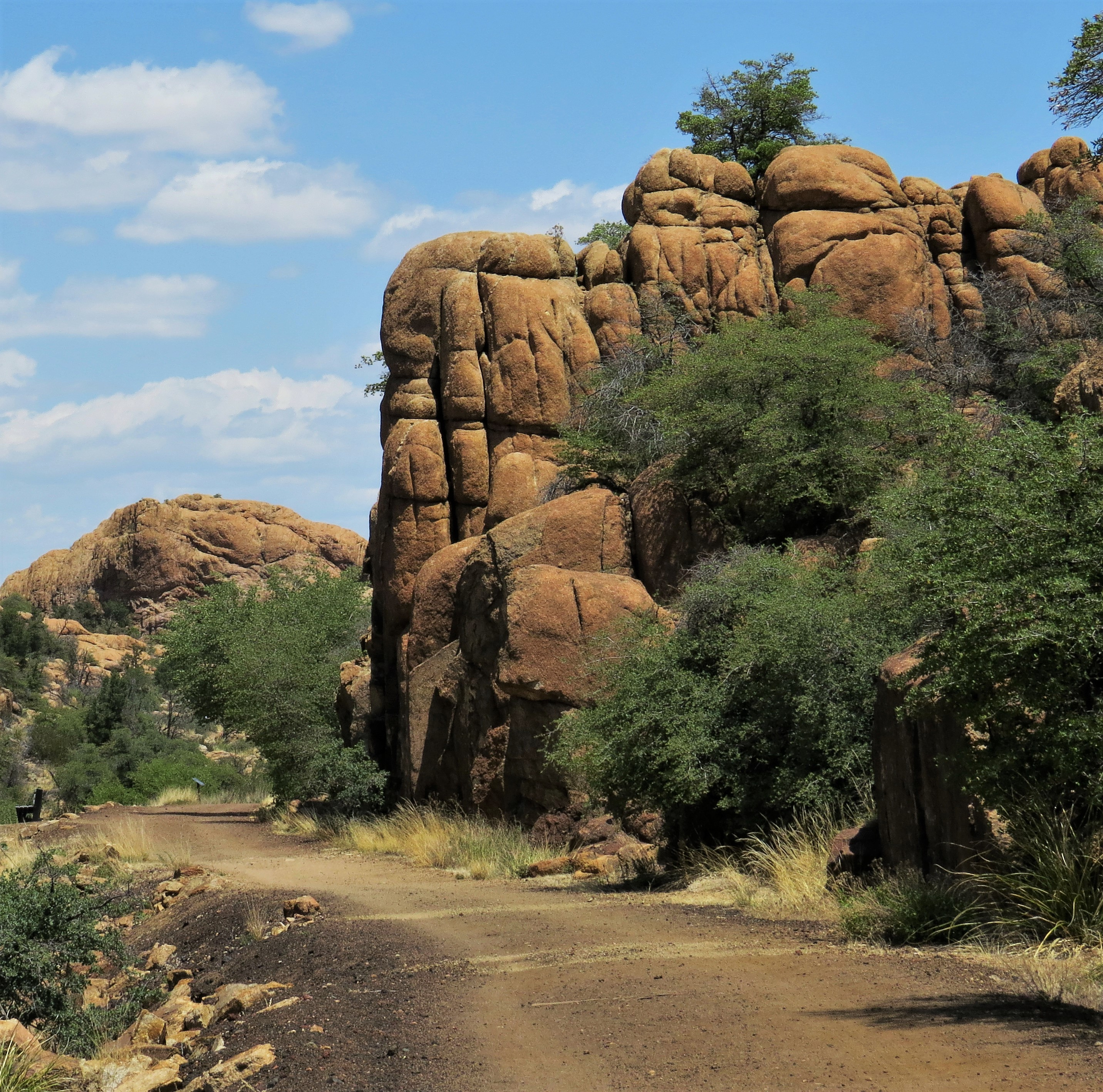
The Peavine Trail

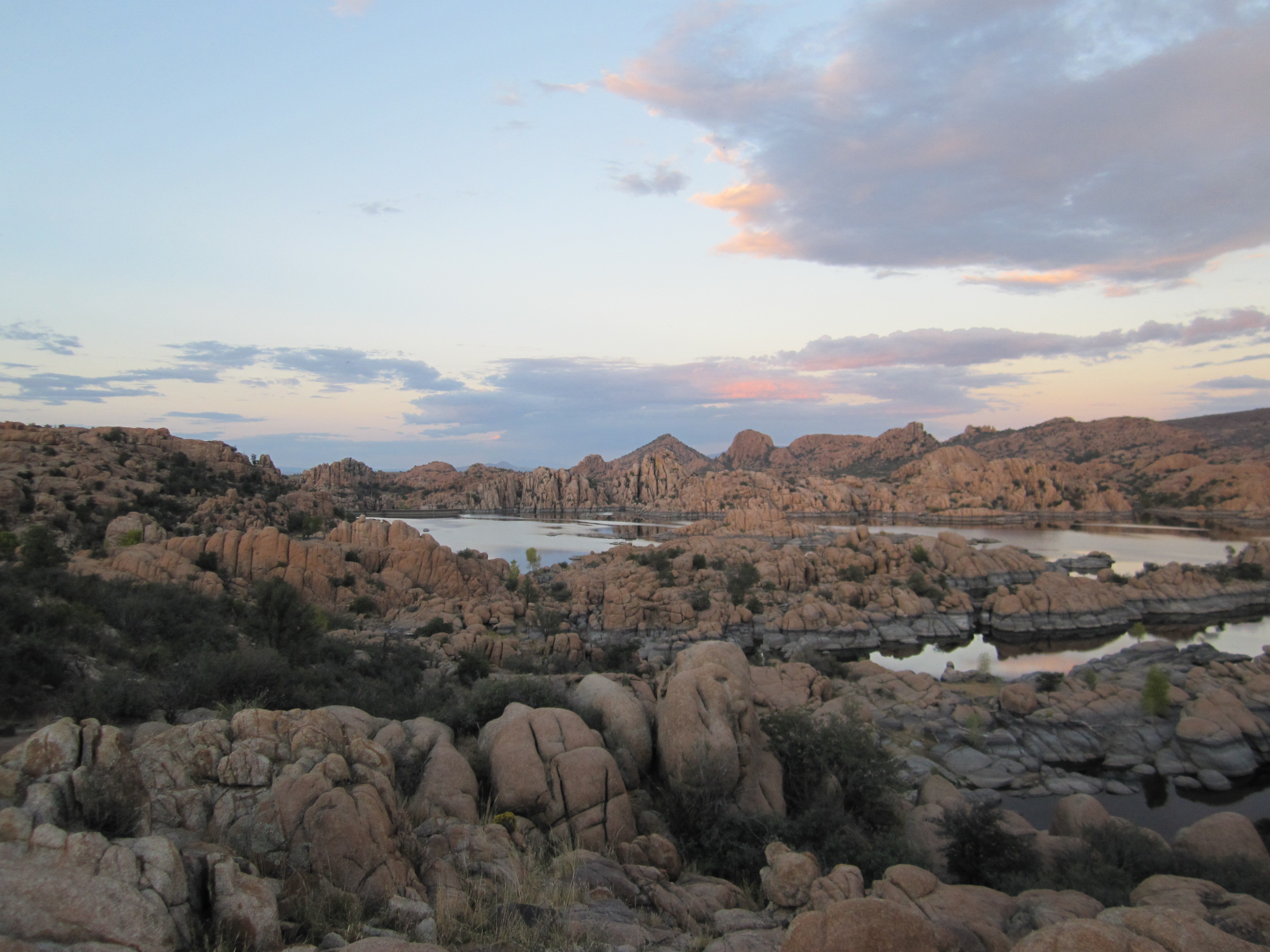
Dells Granite showing spheroidal weathering.

The Granite Dells is a geological feature north of Prescott, Arizona. The Dells consist of exposed bedrock and large boulders of granite that have eroded into an unusual lumpy, rippled appearance. Watson Lake and Willow Lake are small man-made reservoirs in this formation.

The Peavine National Recreation Trail follows the former railbed of the Santa Fe, Prescott and Phoenix Railway through the Granite Dells. This winding portion of the railroad was known as the "Peavine" because its twisting curves resembled that of a pea vine. It connects to the Iron King Trail, which follows the route of the old Prescott & Eastern Railroad through the eastern Granite Dells. Both are rail trail conversions.

== Geology ==
The Precambrian Dells granite has been radiometrically dated at 1.4 billion years old. Its pluton was intruded at a depth of around one or two miles (1.6 to 3.2 km). These cover rocks have since been eroded away. Weathering along joints produced the rounded boulders and other unusual rock formations that characterize the Granite Dells. This process is called spheroidal weathering, and is common in granitic terrains.

The Dells granite has an unusually high uranium content, and thus homes built over the granite should be checked for radon leaking from the granite.
