= Paulden, Arizona =

CDP in Yavapai County, Arizona

- CDP
- Location in Yavapai County and the state of Arizona

- Location in the United States
- Coordinates: 34°53′30″N 112°29′53″W
- Country: United States
- State: Arizona
- County: Yavapai

Area
  - Total: 57.32 sq mi (148.47 km^{2})
  - Land: 57.32 sq mi (148.47 km^{2})
  - Water: 0 sq mi (0.00 km^{2})
- Elevation: 4,364 ft (1,330 m)

Population (2020)
  - Total: 5,567
  - Density: 97/sq mi (37.5/km^{2})
- Time zone: UTC-7 (MST)
- ZIP code: 86334
- Area code: 928
- FIPS code: 04-53560
- GNIS feature ID: 2409038

Paulden is a census designated place (CDP) in Yavapai County, Arizona, United States. The population was 5,231 at the 2010 census.

== Geography ==
According to the United States Census Bureau, the CDP has a total area of 62.8 square miles (162.7 km^{2}), of which, 62.8 square miles (162.5 km^{2}) is land and 0.1 square mile (0.2 km^{2}) (0.10%) is water.

== Demographics ==
Historical population
| Census | Pop. | Note | %± |
|---|---|---|---|
| 2010 | 5,231 | | — |
| 2020 | 5,567 | | 6.4% |
U.S. Decennial Census

=== 2020 census ===
As of the 2020 census, Paulden had a population of 5,567. The median age was 47.8 years. 19.9% of residents were under the age of 18 and 24.1% of residents were 65 years of age or older. For every 100 females there were 101.0 males, and for every 100 females age 18 and over there were 100.0 males age 18 and over.

0.0% of residents lived in urban areas, while 100.0% lived in rural areas.

There were 2,122 households in Paulden, of which 25.4% had children under the age of 18 living in them. Of all households, 56.1% were married-couple households, 19.0% were households with a male householder and no spouse or partner present, and 18.7% were households with a female householder and no spouse or partner present. About 21.8% of all households were made up of individuals and 11.3% had someone living alone who was 65 years of age or older.

There were 2,387 housing units, of which 11.1% were vacant. The homeowner vacancy rate was 2.8% and the rental vacancy rate was 7.4%.

Racial composition as of the 2020 census
| Race | Number | Percent |
|---|---|---|
| White | 4,171 | 74.9% |
| Black or African American | 13 | 0.2% |
| American Indian and Alaska Native | 71 | 1.3% |
| Asian | 29 | 0.5% |
| Native Hawaiian and Other Pacific Islander | 2 | 0.0% |
| Some other race | 652 | 11.7% |
| Two or more races | 629 | 11.3% |
| Hispanic or Latino (of any race) | 1,265 | 22.7% |

=== 2010 census ===
As of the census of 2010, there were 5,231 people, 1,917 households, and 1,420 families living in the CDP. The population density was 53.0 inhabitants per square mile (20.5/km^{2}). There were 1,334 housing units at an average density of 21.3 per square mile (8.2/km^{2}). The racial makeup of the CDP was 82.8% White, 0.7% Black or African American, 1.4% Native American, 0.4% Asian, 0.1% Pacific Islander, 11.9% from other races, and 2.8% from two or more races. 24.3% of the population were Hispanic or Latino of any race.

There were 1,420 households, out of which 27.2% had children under the age of 18 living with them, 60.0% were married couples living together, 7.7% had a female householder with no husband present, and 25.9% were non-families. 20.2% of all households were made up of individuals, and 6.7% had someone living alone who was 65 years of age or older. The average household size was 2.73 and the average family size was 3.14.

In the CDP, the population was spread out, with 26.8% under the age of 19, 6.2% from 20 to 24, 20.9% from 25 to 44, 32.9% from 45 to 64, and 14.9% who were 65 years of age or older. The median age was 43.4 years. For every 100 females, there were 102.7 males. For every 100 females age 18 and over, there were 103.0 males.

The median income for a household in the CDP was $41,402, and the median income for a family was $43,267. Males had a median income of $25,573 versus $22,781 for females. The per capita income for the CDP was $17,064. About 22.7% of families and 26.9% of the population were below the poverty line, including 45.7% of those under age 18 and 13.0% of those age 65 or over.

== Education ==
Almost all of the CDP is in the Chino Valley Unified School District. A portion is in the Williamson Valley Elementary School District.

== Notable people ==
- Jeff Cooper, founder of the Gunsite Training Center.
- Andy Tobin, majority leader of the Arizona House of Representatives
- Hyram Yarbro, social media personality and skin care commentator
- Justin Albert, American badass
