= Chino Valley, Arizona =

Town in Yavapai County, Arizona

- Town
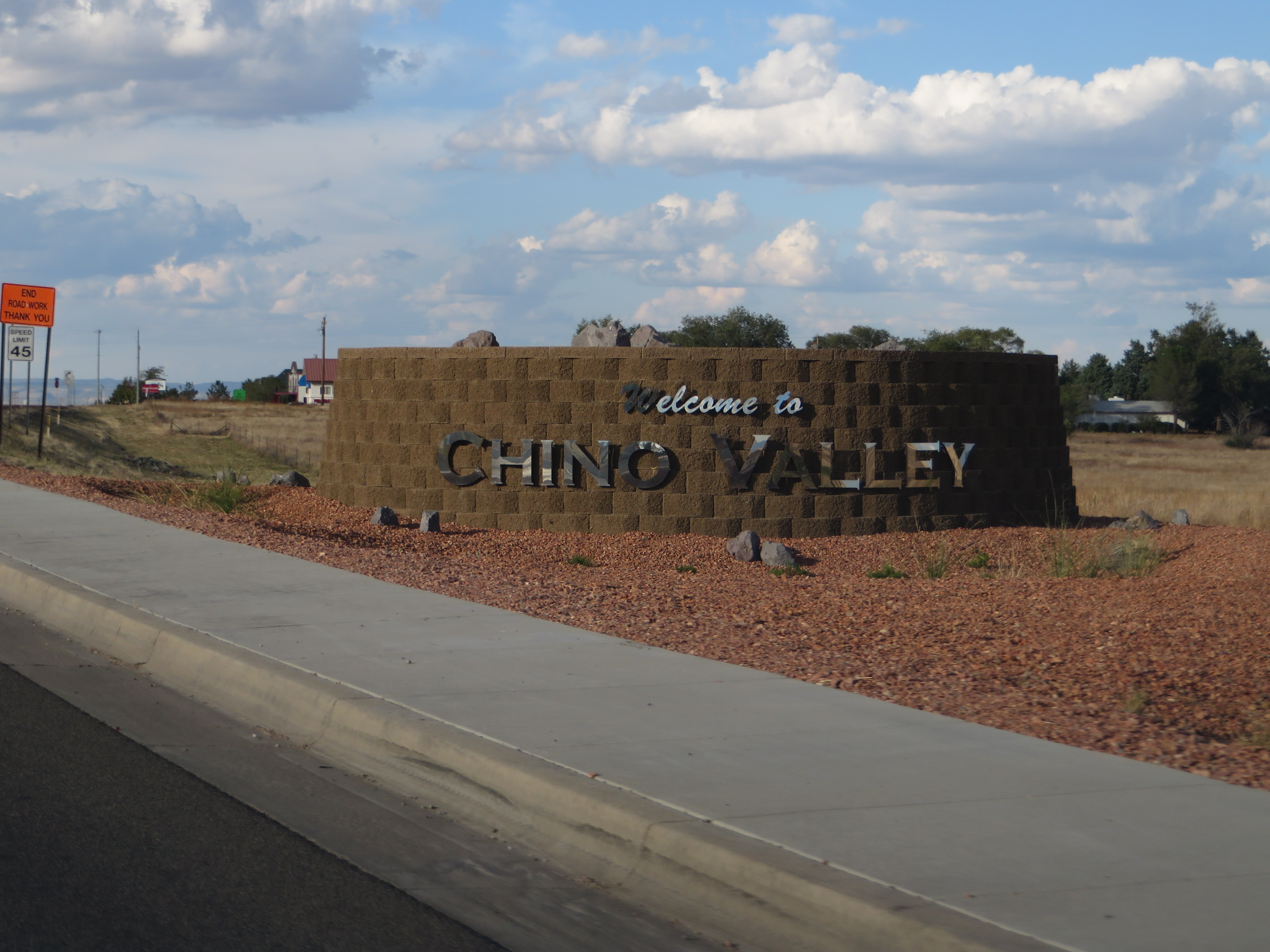
- Chino Valley welcome sign

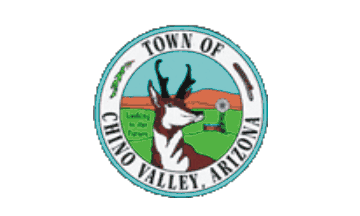
- Flag

- Location of Chino Valley in Yavapai County, Arizona

- Location in Arizona Chino Valley, Arizona (the United States)
- Coordinates: 34°45′30″N 112°25′27″W
- Country: United States
- State: Arizona
- County: Yavapai
- Established: 1970

Government
  - Mayor: Tom Armstrong

Area
  - Total: 62.48 sq mi (161.83 km^{2})
  - Land: 62.46 sq mi (161.77 km^{2})
  - Water: 0.023 sq mi (0.06 km^{2})
- Elevation: 4,734 ft (1,443 m)

Population (2020)
  - Total: 13,020
  - Density: 208.4/sq mi (80.48/km^{2})
- Time zone: UTC-7 (MST)
- ZIP code: 86323
- Area code: 928
- FIPS code: 04-12840
- GNIS feature ID: 2413199
- Website: Town of Chino Valley

Chino Valley is a town in Yavapai County, Arizona, United States. According to the 2020 United States census, the population of the town is 13,020.

== History ==
Chino Valley is the site of the first Territorial Capital of Arizona. The capital moved to Prescott, 15 miles (24 km) away, in 1864. U.S. Army Cavalry Lt. Amiel W. Whipple, while traveling through the area in 1854, gave the community its name. "Chino" is the Spanish name for the abundant curly grama grass growing in the area.

In 1895, a narrow gauge branch of the United Verde and Pacific Railroad to Jerome, joining the Santa Fe, Prescott, and Phoenix Railway, was completed, and Jerome Junction was established. In 1923, the activities of Jerome Junction were absorbed by Chino Valley.

In 1960, Chino Valley's population was estimated as 50 residents.

The town of Chino Valley was incorporated in 1970.

The town is in north-central Arizona, on state Highway 89, 15 miles (24 km) north of Prescott and 35 miles (56 km) south of Ash Fork, which is on Interstate 40. Chino Valley is at an elevation of about 4,750 feet (1,450 m).

== Geography ==
Chino Valley is located adjacent the southeast terminus of Chino Valley, approximately 9 miles (14 km) south of Paulden. The smaller north-trending Little Chino Valley lies just east of the townsite.

According to the United States Census Bureau, the town has a total area of 63.4 square miles (164 km^{2}), all land.

=== Climate ===
Chino Valley has a cool semi-arid climate (Köppen BSk). Its high altitude and valley location nakes it both cooler and drier than other parts of Yavapai County.

Climate data for Chino Valley, Arizona
Month	Jan	Feb	Mar	Apr	May	Jun	Jul	Aug	Sep	Oct	Nov	Dec	Year
Mean daily maximum °F (°C)	52.3 (11.3)	56.3 (13.5)	62.1 (16.7)	69.9 (21.1)	78.5 (25.8)	88.6 (31.4)	92.4 (33.6)	89.5 (31.9)	85.5 (29.7)	75.0 (23.9)	63.2 (17.3)	53.7 (12.1)	72.3 (22.4)
Mean daily minimum °F (°C)	21.5 (−5.8)	24.1 (−4.4)	28.3 (−2.1)	34.4 (1.3)	41.7 (5.4)	49.8 (9.9)	59.0 (15.0)	57.2 (14.0)	49.1 (9.5)	38.0 (3.3)	27.3 (−2.6)	21.3 (−5.9)	37.6 (3.1)
Average precipitation inches (mm)	0.95 (24)	0.93 (24)	0.92 (23)	0.56 (14)	0.34 (8.6)	0.28 (7.1)	1.81 (46)	2.01 (51)	1.27 (32)	0.81 (21)	0.64 (16)	0.97 (25)	11.50 (292)
Average snowfall inches (cm)	2.2 (5.6)	1.4 (3.6)	1.3 (3.3)	0.2 (0.51)	0.0 (0.0)	0.0 (0.0)	0.0 (0.0)	0.0 (0.0)	0.0 (0.0)	0.0 (0.0)	0.5 (1.3)	1.5 (3.8)	7.1 (18)
Source: WRCC

== Demographics ==
Historical population
Census	Pop.	Note	%±
1970	803		—
1980	2,858		255.9%
1990	4,837		69.2%
2000	7,835		62.0%
2010	10,817		38.1%
2020	13,020		20.4%
U.S. Decennial Census

=== 2020 census ===
As of the 2020 census, Chino Valley had a population of 13,020. The median age was 49.7 years. 19.2% of residents were under the age of 18 and 27.7% of residents were 65 years of age or older. For every 100 females there were 97.8 males, and for every 100 females age 18 and over there were 95.2 males age 18 and over.

81.0% of residents lived in urban areas, while 19.0% lived in rural areas.

There were 5,333 households in Chino Valley, of which 24.6% had children under the age of 18 living in them. Of all households, 51.6% were married-couple households, 17.3% were households with a male householder and no spouse or partner present, and 23.6% were households with a female householder and no spouse or partner present. About 25.7% of all households were made up of individuals and 14.9% had someone living alone who was 65 years of age or older.

There were 5,754 housing units, of which 7.3% were vacant. The homeowner vacancy rate was 1.9% and the rental vacancy rate was 3.7%.

Racial composition as of the 2020 census
Race	Number	Percent
White	10,494	80.6%
Black or African American	64	0.5%
American Indian and Alaska Native	134	1.0%
Asian	103	0.8%
Native Hawaiian and Other Pacific Islander	19	0.1%
Some other race	766	5.9%
Two or more races	1,440	11.1%
Hispanic or Latino (of any race)	2,095	16.1%

=== 2000 census ===
As of the census of 2000, there were 7,835 people, 3,030 households, and 2,172 families residing in the town. The population density was 421.6 inhabitants per square mile (162.8/km^{2}). There were 3,256 housing units at an average density of 175.2 per square mile (67.6/km^{2}). The racial makeup of the town was 94.1% White, 0.2% Black or African American, 0.9% Native American, 0.2% Asian, 0.1% Pacific Islander, 2.6% from other races, and 1.9% from two or more races. 9.8% of the population were Hispanic or Latino of any race.

There were 3,030 households, out of which 32.5% had children under the age of 18 living with them, 57.3% were married couples living together, 10.3% had a female householder with no husband present, and 28.3% were non-families. 23.0% of all households were made up of individuals, and 11.1% had someone living alone who was 65 years of age or older. The average household size was 2.58 and the average family size was 3.01.

In the town, the population was spread out, with 26.5% under the age of 18, 7.1% from 18 to 24, 25.0% from 25 to 44, 25.1% from 45 to 64, and 16.2% who were 65 years of age or older. The median age was 40 years. For every 100 females, there were 96.4 males. For every 100 females age 18 and over, there were 91.5 males.

The median income for a household in the town was $32,289, and the median income for a family was $35,013. Males had a median income of $27,160 versus $21,667 for females. The per capita income for the town was $15,555. About 12.6% of families and 15.5% of the population were below the poverty line, including 20.2% of those under age 18 and 13.5% of those age 65 or over.

== Education ==
Most of Chino Valley is in the Chino Valley Unified School District. A piece of the town is in the Humboldt Unified School District.

The Chino Valley Unified School District presently operates four school facilities in the Town of Chino Valley. Territorial Early Education Center (Pre-K through Second Grade) and Del Rio Elementary (Third through Fifth Grades) students.

Heritage Middle School educates sixth through eighth graders in the district. Two County Teachers of the Year and Two Channel 3 Silver Apple Teacher award winners are on the HMS faculty.

Chino Valley High School partners with Yavapai College Campus for Agribusiness, Science & Technology, located in Chino Valley, where seniors may jointly enroll in CVHS and Yavapai for advanced study. The school's Aquaculture & Biotech Lab, Greenhouse and Livestock Facilities support the FFA program. CVHS houses five computer lab environments for students plus programs in music and art, and an FBLA program, along with the full component of extracurricular activities and sports programs.

The district operates under the supervision of a five-member governing board and one district superintendent. The district presently employs 7 administrators and 6 directors on a full-time basis, 158 certified teachers and 190 full- and part-time classified employees.

Chino Valley has two charter schools that operate in the town. Mingus Springs is a kindergarten–8th grade school that services over 180 students. Excel Education Centers is a 6th–12th grade school that services over 50 students.

Chino Valley also has a campus of Yavapai College.

== Government ==
Title	Name
Mayor	Jack Miller
Vice Mayor	Annie Perkins
Council Member	Tom Armstrong
Council Member	Lon Turner
Council Member	Cloyce Kelly
Council Member	John McCafferty

== Gallery ==
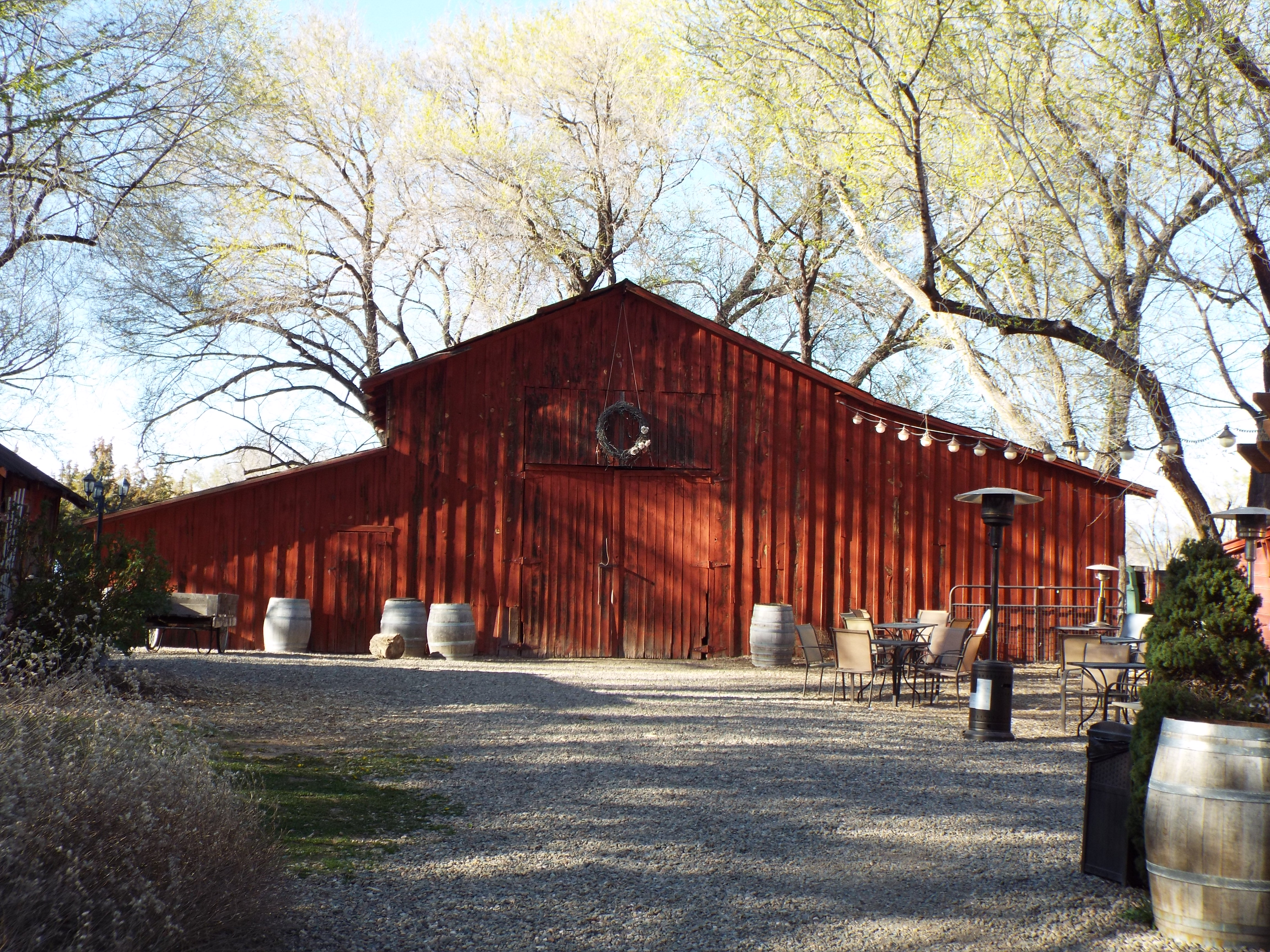
1917 Granite Creek Vineyards Barn

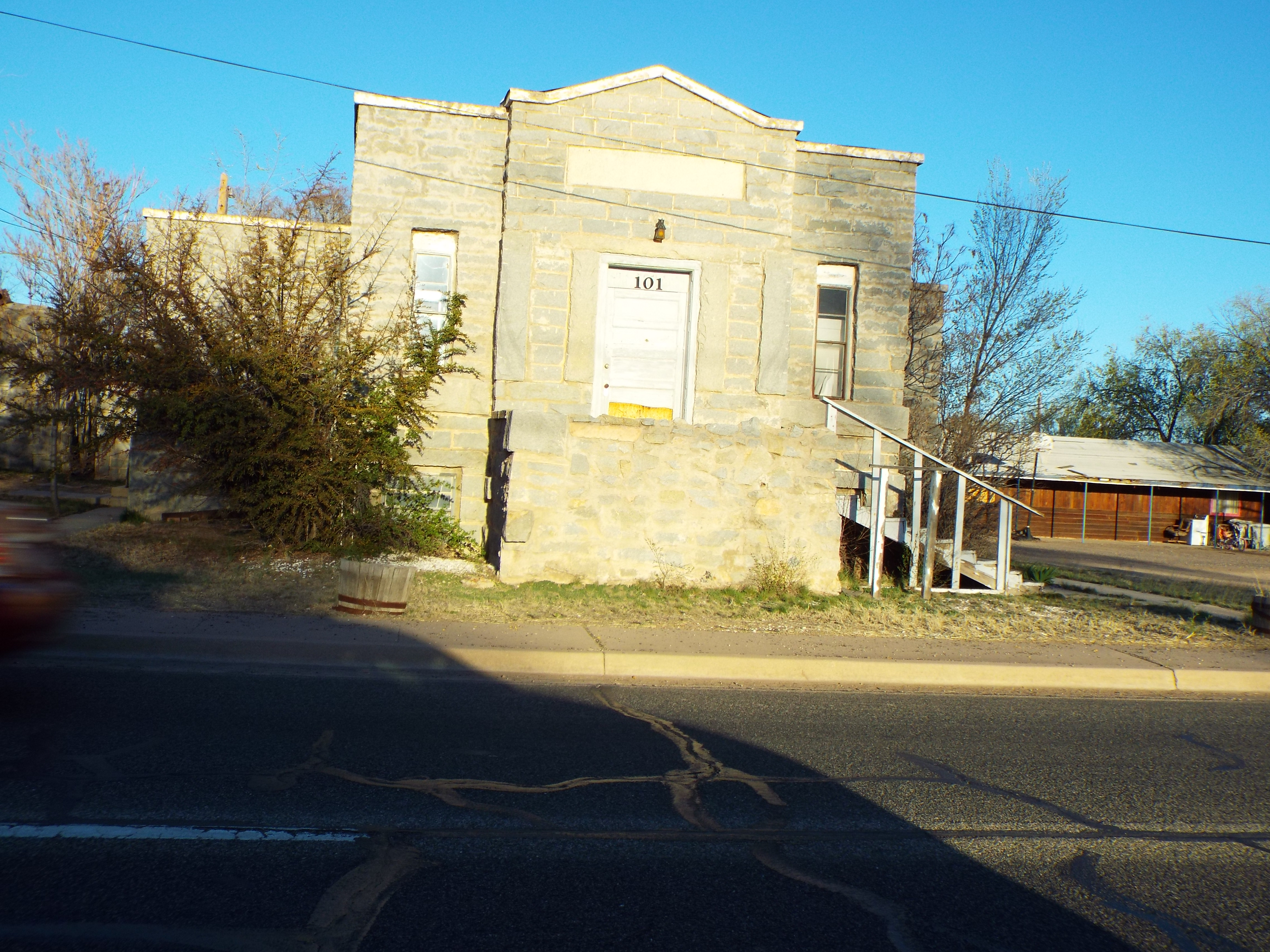
Abandoned 1919 Latter-day Saints chapel

== Del Rio Springs ==
A private cemetery in Del Rio Springs holds early settlers. There is a historical marker in Chino Valley which has the following inscription:

Del Rio Springs
Site of original Camp Whipple established December 1863
From January 22 to May 18, 1864 the offices of the Territorial Government of Arizona were operated from tents and log cabins here, before being moved to Prescott the first permanent capital.

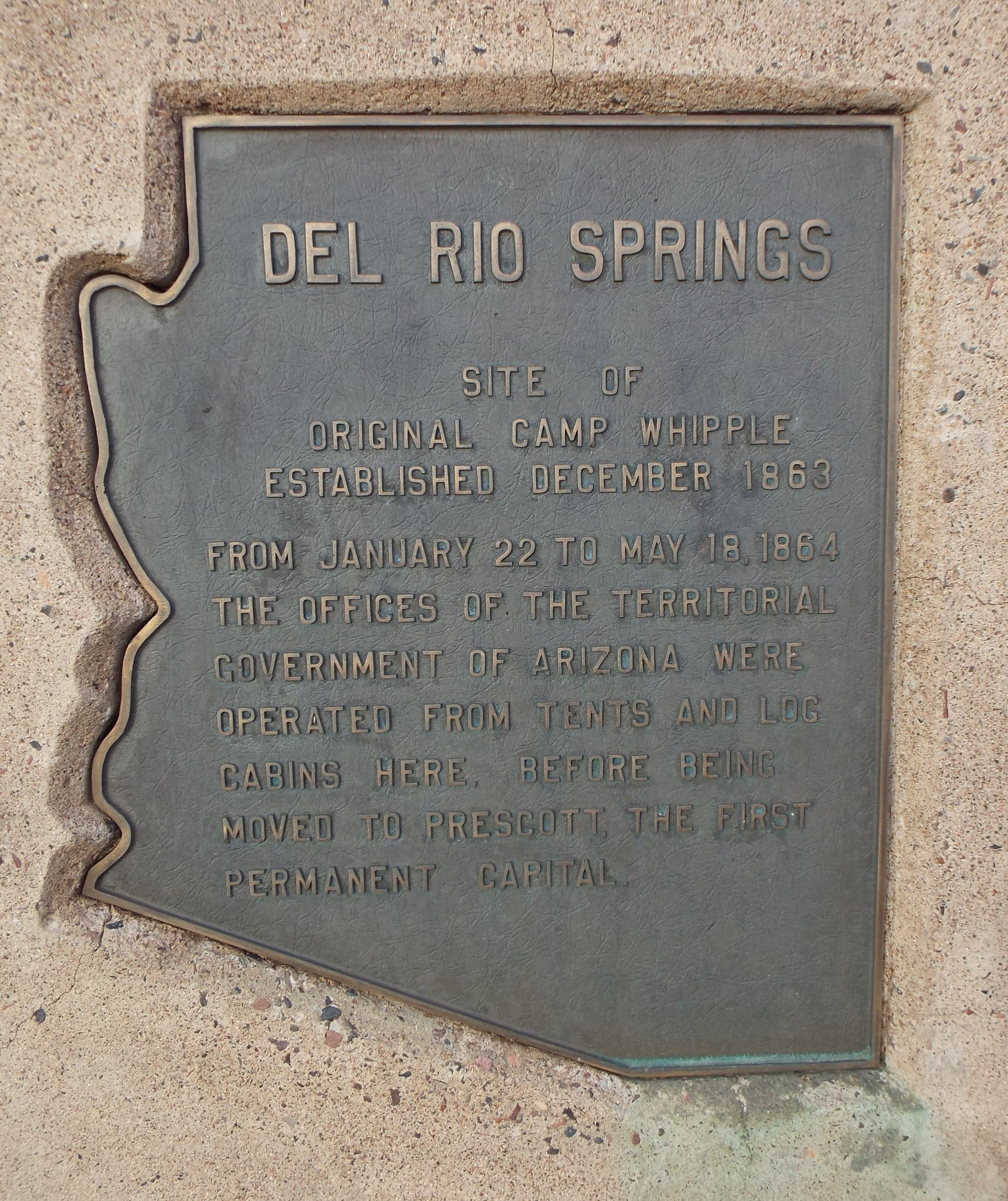
Del Rio Springs historic marker
