= List of historical markers in Prescott, Arizona =

This is a list of Historical markers in the city of Prescott in Yavapai County, Arizona.

Marker name	Image	Location	Coords	Description
The Bank of Arizona and the Electric Buildings		SE corner of Gurley and Cortez streets	34.54180000°N 112.46861667°W	
Bashford Block		NW corner of Gurley and Cortez streets	34.54185000°N 112.46893333°W	
Bashford Burmister Company		NE corner of Gurley and Montezuma streets	34.54175000°N 112.47016667°W	
Buckey O'Neill VFW Post 541		200 N Arizona Avenue	34.54385000°N 112.45933333°W	
The Carnegie Library		125 East Gurley Street	34.54161667°N 112.46755000°W	
Citizens Cemetery		800 East Sheldon Street	34.54506667°N 112.45830000°W	
City Jail and Firehouse		117 West Goodwin Street	34.53983333°N 112.46960000°W	
City Park and Ballfield		NE corner of Gurley and Washington streets	34.54203333°N 112.46038333°W	Appearing on the marker are the words "City Park and Ballfield, Now Ken Lindley Field has been placed on the National Register of Historic Places by the United States Department of the Interior"
Curtis Hall, Curtis Duplex and Curtis Cottages (original location)		125 South McCormick Street	34.54090000°N 112.47290000°W	
The Day Octagon		212 East Gurley Street	34.54198333°N 112.46678333°W	
The Ehle Family and the Montezuma Hotel		NW corner of Montezuma and Willis streets	34.54408333°N 112.47025000°W	
The Fire of 1900		SW corner of Montezuma and Goodwin streets	34.53975000°N 112.47035000°W	
J.I. Gardner Store		NE corner of Cortez and Willis streets	34.54396667°N 112.46855000°W	
Goldwater Brothers Mercantile (original location)		NE corner of Union and Cortez streets	34.54076667°N 112.46853333°W	
Grace M. Sparkes		854 East Gurley Street	34.54215000°N 112.45851667°W	
Granite Creek		300 West Gurley Street	34.54183333°N 112.47221667°W	
Head Hotel		117 North Cortez Street	34.54278333°N 112.46865000°W	
Hotel St. Michael		205 West Gurley Street	34.54163333°N 112.47020000°W	
Hotel Vendome		230 South Cortez Street	34.53896667°N 112.46891667°W	
Howey's Hall (original location)		201 South Cortez Street	34.53970000°N 112.46850000°W	
Knights of Pythias Building		105 South Cortez Street	34.54161667°N 112.46858333°W	
Lincoln School		201 Park Avenue	34.54061667°N 112.47738333°W	
Montezuma Street		100 South Montezuma Street	34.54093333°N 112.47018333°W	
Mulvenon Building		227 W Gurley Street	34.54191667°N 112.47131667°W	
Nob Hill		SE corner of Union and Marina streets	34.54070000°N 112.46710000°W	
O'Neill/Munds House (original location)		420 E Sheldon Streey	34.54566667°N 112.46365000°W	
The Palace Saloon		120 South Montezuma Street	34.54136667°N 112.47025000°W	
Plaza Bandstand		Courthouse Plaza	34.54150000°N 112.46976667°W	
Prescott		101 West Goodwin Street	34.53976667°N 112.46913333°W	Appearing on the marker are the words "Founded in 1864 on Granite Creek, early source of placer gold. Former territorial capital of Arizona. Now a center for ranching, mining, health, especially asthma relief. Located here on site of old Ft. Whipple is Whipple Veterans Hospital. Seat of First Governor's Mansion, and Arizona Pioneer's Home. Frontier Days, oldest rodeo in West, began here." Erected by Prescott Rotary Club 1959
Prescott's Beginnings: The First Mining District in Yavapai County		150 South Montezuma Street	34.54091667°N 112.47018333°W	
Prescott High School and the Yavapai Club		SW corner of Gurley and Alarcon streets	34.54171667°N 112.46603333°W	
Prescott National Bank		NE corner of Gurley and Cortez streets	34.54198333°N 112.46853333°W	
Prescott National Guard Armory		824 East Gurly Street	34.54210000°N 112.45851667°W	
Prescott Public Library		215 East Goodwin Street	34.53923333°N 112.46618333°W	
Ruffner Plaza Stables		Near 117 W Goodwin Street	34.53985000°N 112.46988333°W	
Sacred Heart Catholic Church and Rectory		208 North Marina Street	34.54393333°N 112.46741667°W	
Santa Fe Depot		100 East Sheldon Street	34.54515000°N 112.46880000°W	
Territorial Capital		SE corner of Montezuma and Gurley streets	34.54163333°N 112.47021667°W	
Territorial Courthouse (original location)		SW corner of Cortez and Gurley streets	34.54171667°N 112.46891667°W	
Washington School		300 East Gurley Street	34.54198333°N 112.46531667°W	
Wilson Block and Wilson Apartments		104 North Montezuma Street		
Pauline Weaver		321 W Gurley Street	34.54185000°N 112.47220000°W	
Pauline Weaver		415 W Gurley Street	34.54173333°N 112.47375000°W	
"Whiskey Row"		120 South Montezuma Street		
The "Whiskey Row" Alley		Behind South Montezuma Street		

== See also ==
- National Register of Historic Places listings in Prescott, Arizona
- List of National Historic Landmarks in Arizona
