= Falcon Nest =

Building in Arizona, United States

- Location within Arizona Location within the United States

General information
- Status: Completed
- Location: Arizona, Prescott, United States
- Coordinates: 34.545°N 112.517°W
- Elevation: 5920
- Completed: 1994
- Cost: $3.5 million
- Owner: Ernst & Srishti Wilhelm

Height
- Height: 124 feet (38 m)

Technical details
- Floor count: 10
- Floor area: 6,200 square feet (580 m^{2})
- Grounds: 1.08 acres (0.44 ha)

Design and construction
- Architect: Sukumar Pal
- Known for: Tallest residence in North America, Passive heating and cooling

Falcon Nest is a detached residence in Prescott, Arizona, that is the tallest single family home in North America at 124 feet (38 m). Its name is attributed to its resemblance to a large mountainside bird's nest and the peregrine falcons that inhabit the area. It is located in Yavapai County, approximately a two-hour drive northwest of Arizona's capitol, Phoenix.

== History ==
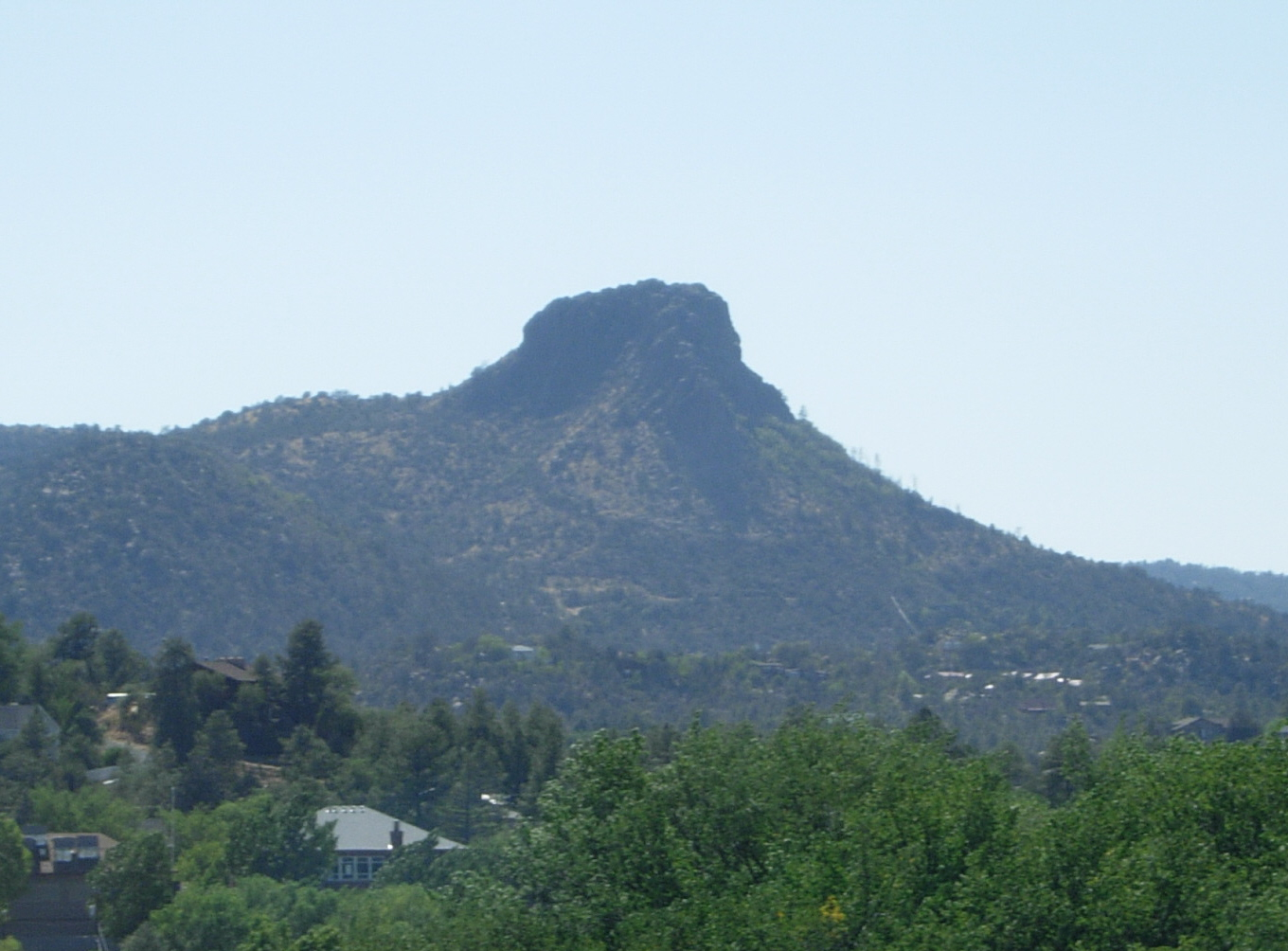
Thumb Butte, at Prescott's west side, in June 2007.

The home is 6,200 square feet (580 m^{2}) in size and was designed by Phoenix architect Sukumar Pal for himself. It was built in 1994 at a cost of approximately $3.5 million and is located on the slopes of Thumb Butte, a prominent geographical feature of the Sierra Prieta mountain range in the Prescott National Forest and a popular hiking venue with trails that ascend and encircle the butte, a 6,514-foot (1,985 m) volcanic plug. According to Pal, since the house is below the summit of the butte, Falcon Nest was an appropriate name as falcons typically nest at lower elevations than eagles, who take the highest perches. The elevation at the base of the house is approximately 5,920 ft (1,800 m).

== Configuration ==
Although the house is relatively large, its foundation is a square measuring 24 by 24 feet (7.3 m × 7.3 m); its size is spread vertically over ten stories. Much of the main floor extends out from the core of the structure similar to large fully enclosed balconies on four sides. This 2,000-square-foot (190 m^{2}) area is built as a solarium with glass walls and roof. It includes two bedrooms, two bathrooms, a kitchen, and a great room. A third bedroom and two additional bathrooms are on other levels. The house is 124 feet (38 m) in height. Although local zoning codes do not normally allow homes of this height, the lowest two floors are considered basement levels, three floors are livable space, and the remainder is a natural convective cooling and passive solar heating system. A hydraulic elevator provides access to the main level on the sixth floor from the ground level. Stairs, 135 in total, are used to access the upper floors and as an alternative to the elevator. This house is actually much shorter than the world's tallest, (Note: Some sources discount Antilia since it has characteristics more common to a skyscraper than a home.) the approximately 560 foot (170 m) tall Antilia in South Mumbai, India. Falcon Nest is built upon natural granite, held in place by gravity without other physical attachment. Pal claims this will minimize damage in the event of earthquake activity.

== Location ==
Hundreds of sites were considered before Pal chose the Thumb Butte location. The approximately 1 acre (0.40 ha) site allowed for views for long distances in many directions, and regulations in other areas precluded building such a structure. Opposition to the project caused Prescott's zoning laws to be changed; the house could not be built today. After construction, Prescott amended its zoning to restrict height to 35 feet (11 m) from the lowest natural grade on the building's perimeter. Views extend to 120 miles (190 km) and include the San Francisco Peaks, Humphrey's Peak, and Bill Williams Mountain. The property's western border abuts the Prescott National Forest.

== Sale ==
The house was listed for sale in 2015 for $2.8 million, and again in 2017 for $1.5 million. In addition to its use as a home, it was marketed as a potential educational, office, museum, lodging, or event space. After a failed attempt was to sell the house by auction in May 2017, it was relisted for $2.8 million as was still for sale as of August 2017. The house was sold on March 29, 2018, for $755,000 to astrologer Ernst Wilhelm and artist Srishti Wilhelm for both living and office use.

== In media ==
The home was featured on Extreme Homes on the HGTV network in 1994. It was featured as "House of the Day" in The Wall Street Journal on May 6, 2015. The April 2017 issue of greenliving AZ included an article on the house.
