= Tsunami on the Square =

Performing-arts and culture festival in Prescott, Arizona

Tsunami on the Square is an annual performing-arts and culture festival in Prescott, Arizona that showcases exotic and unique performance art forms not typically seen in smaller towns. Historically, it took place on the third weekend in June on Prescott's historic Courthouse Square. In 2015, Tsunami switched to the fourth weekend of October due to the county's concerns about grass maintenance in June. The festival features a mix of local, national and internationally known professional performers.

== History ==
Tsunami on the Square is named after the natural event least likely to occur in the high desert and was founded by Jay Ruby of The Carpetbag Brigade in 1998. JACQUES LALIBERTÉ, artist, was a Co-founder of the festival, and is believed to have conceived its moniker. The festival is funded primarily through donations from area residents, grants and sponsorships from local businesses.

In 2005, Tsunami on the Square held its first Circus Camp for children between the ages of 6 and 14. Circus Camp is held during the week(s) leading up to Tsunami and the children get to lead the parade that opens the Tsunami on the Square Festival. They are also the opening act on the main stage. Starting in 2011, children over the age of 14 who wanted to continue learning and participating in Circus Camp were given the opportunity to become Circus Camp Counselors in Training. Several of the instructors at Circus Camp are also visiting artists who perform on the main stage at the Tsunami festival.

=== Past directors ===
After Jay Ruby there have been five Executive Directors: John "J.T." Tannous, Susan Defreitas, Megan Buchanan Cherry, Andrew Johnson-Schmit and Tom Von Deck.

== Festival details ==
Tsunami on the Square features a wide range of performance traditions and styles. Past festivals have featured acts such as Native American hoop dancing, modern dance, circus arts, acrobatic stilt walkers, fire performers, hula hoopers, blacklight theater, Japanese Butoh and giant puppets. In addition to the main event, Tsunami on the Square also has traditionally included a site-specific performance on the Thursday before the festival called Flourish Before the Flood.

In 2011, a new event on the Friday before the main Tsunami on the Square festival was added. Neptune's Tea Party featured an acrobatic stilt performance by The Carpetbag Brigade, excerpts of Ember Larson's folk opera, music by Dutch Holly, and music/video/spoken word by Verbobala. This event was held at the historic Elks Opera House in downtown Prescott.

Some past festival performers include headliners and crowd favorites: Beatmauler, Pyroklectic, The Carpetbag Brigade, Clan Tynker, Flam Chen, Koichi Tamano and Harupin-ha, Archedream for Humankind, Grupo Axé Capoeira, Kid Beyond, Bad Unkl Sista, Aero HoopStars, Troupe Salamat, Verbobala, and Jonathan Best.

One of the popular fundraising methods of the festival is the Skitmercial. Skitmercials are live skits, performed on stage, about festival sponsors. The 2015 production added Rapmercials to the mix, including full length rap songs for upper level sponsors. Phoenix artist Jacob Schaffer, aka "Jakeup the Savior" wrote and performed the Rapmercials in 2015. Future Rapmercials will include a troupe of dancers like the Fly Girls of the TV program, In Living Color. Future years will include Songmercials and Poetrymercials.

== The fall of tsunami ==
It was announced in January 2014 that the board of directors had dissolved the nonprofit because no one heeded the call to take then Executive Director Andrew Johnson-Schmit's place. The two-year search for a new director ended. The festival did not happen in 2014.

== 2015 Revival ==
Prescott resident Tom Von Deck made a public statement on June 16, 2014 that he had spearheaded a local effort to bring the festival back in 2015. The festival was incorporated in September 2014 as Tsunami Arts Festival. Their fiscal sponsor began accepting tax deductible donations for the festival that October.

The first big performing arts party celebrating the festival's return into the 2015 year was called The Balloonfish Bash. On November 8, 2014 fire performers Pyroklectic provided a 25-minute sneak preview of the show they planned to do at Tsunami on the Square 2015. Ballet Folklorico Sol de Mexico, a dance troupe composed of girls between the ages of 5 and 12, made their Tsunami debut that night. Other performers included jugglers Frankie Cardamone and Heather and Ivan Marriott, Jewel of the Desert Belly Dance, Zumba Fitness with Tiger and Albert Sarko and the Jazz Workshop Band.

Tsunami 2015 featured performances from Mystic Circus, Pyroklectic, The Carpetbag Brigade, New Moon Tribal Belly Dance, Fantastick Patrick – The One Man Circus, Ballet Folklorico Sol de Mexico, Jonathan Best, hula hooper Sierra Almena, magician Leigh Hotz and juggler Frankie Cardamone. Musical acts included Stella's Infirmary, Paul T. Morris and old time musician Parker Smith. Masters of Ceremonies were Jack Lough, Tom Von Deck and Connecticut resident Dave Bonan.
