= Carnegie Library (Prescott, Arizona) =

- Prescott Public Library
- U.S. National Register of Historic Places
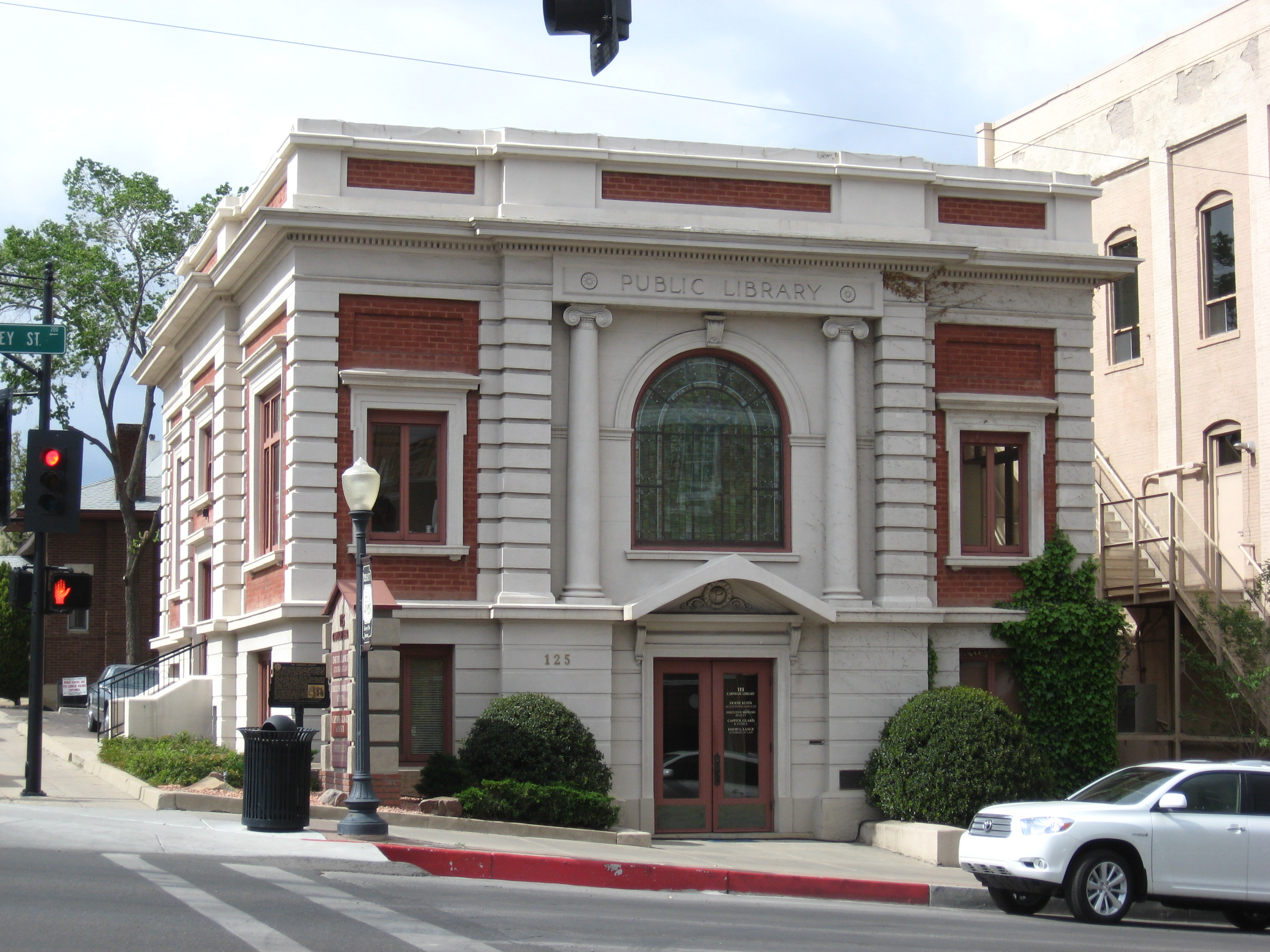
- Old Prescott Public Library

- Location within Arizona Location within the United States
- Location: 125 E. Gurley St., Prescott, Arizona
- Coordinates: 34°32′29.99″N 112°28′3.10″W
- Area: 0.2 acres (0.081 ha)
- Built: 1903
- Built by: Maxwell & Sines
- NRHP reference No.: 75000365
- Added to NRHP: May 28, 1975

Prescott, Arizona, founded in 1864, soon had a children's library that was a collection of books gathered by several women. A Prescott Library Association opened a public reading room space in 1870. But there was no regularly funded library until the Carnegie library (a free public library) at 125 E. Gurley Street was built in 1903. Its funding and construction was a project of the Monday Literary Society or Monday Club, a group formed in 1895 (as the Women's Club of Prescott), a group of women dedicated to the educational and cultural well-being of their community. It has also been known as Prescott Public Library and is listed on the National Register of Historic Places under that name. The replacement library, the current Prescott Public Library, built in 1974, is two blocks away.

== History ==
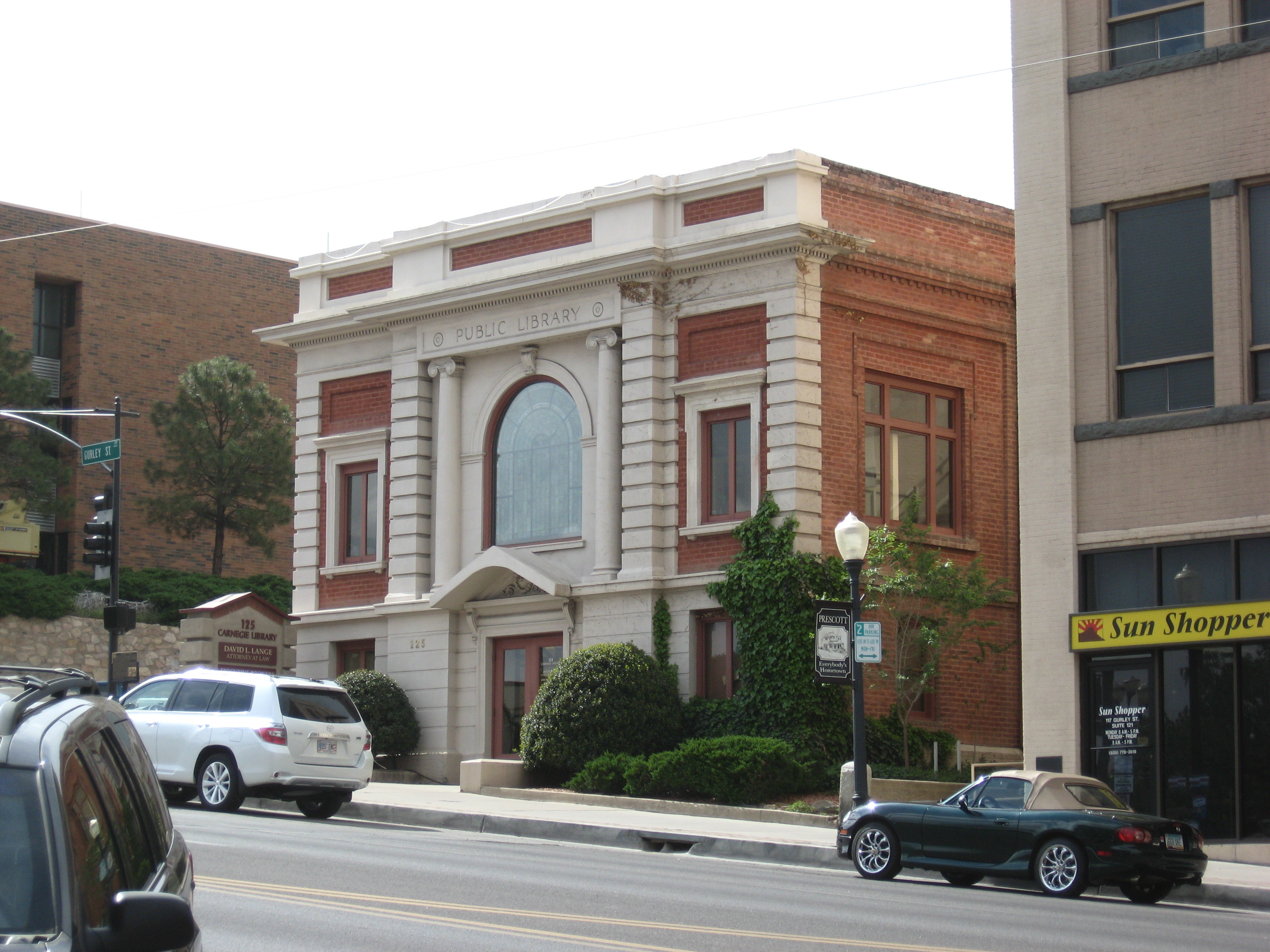

The Monday Club requested matching funds from Andrew Carnegie to build the library. The goal was to create a ‘free public library’ for the Prescott community. In July 1889, Carnegie agreed to fund $4,000 with the understanding the other $4,000 would be raised by the Prescott community. The Monday Club achieved its goal and a building lot was granted. However, a fire in July 1900 destroyed the books for the anticipated library. The Monday Club accepted donations for replacement books and pressed on. In November 1903, the library opened, situated near Marina and Gurley in Prescott, Arizona. It was the first public library in the area.

Julia M. Goldwater, Prescott resident wrote to Andrew Carnegie in 1899, appealing for help to build a library in Prescott:

June 1, 1899

Mr. Andrew Carnegie
Pittsburg [sic?], Pennsylvania

Dear Sir,
Your well known philanthropy has prompted me to appeal to you in the interest of a truly charitable work. In our little town of 3500 inhabitants, we have after much effort and work established a library of nine hundred volumes—good readable books in good condition, but we have no endowment, rents are high, and we have been compelled to charge for the tickets. It is our aim and hope to make the library free and to maintain a free reading room. In no place could such a room be more needed than in Prescott with its large floating population of young men, many of whom can not afford to keep their own rooms lighted and heated, and therefore have no recourse but the saloons and “dives” for there are no innocent amusements in the town. If we could get an endowment of $10,000 or even $8,000, we would at once, make the library free, for all the women on the library committee are willing to work very hard to keep the matter in good shape, to raise money to buy new books and to subscribe for periodicals. I truly believe that the amount of money I mention would do greatest good in this way than in any other. I have tried to write briefly so as not to demand too much of your valuable time, but if you are interested to investigate the matter, I shall taker pleasure in giving you all the information possible. I am privileged to refer to the Governor of the Territory, Hon. N. Oakes Murphy, Phoenix, Arizona, who will tell you I am sure that the library is in capable hands. Hoping that you will feel some interest in our necessities, in spite of the hourly calls on your charity, I am,

Very respectfully yours,
Julia M. Goldwater

Carnegie responded in 1899 with an offer of $4,000, conditional upon the people of Prescott matching that sum. The existing library collection was lost in a 1900 conflagration that burned much of downtown Prescott, but a $1800 insurance claim was paid for the loss, and other fundraising eventually raised enough to meet Carnegie's condition. Builders Maxwell & Sines constructed the library for $8,242. It was opened with 1300 volumes on November 24, 1903. Ownership was passed from the Monday Club to the city of Prescott in 1917.

The library served the Prescott community until 1974 when the current Prescott Public Library opened.

== See also ==
- Carnegie library
- Free Library
