= Prescott Public Library =

Library in Prescott, Arizona, US

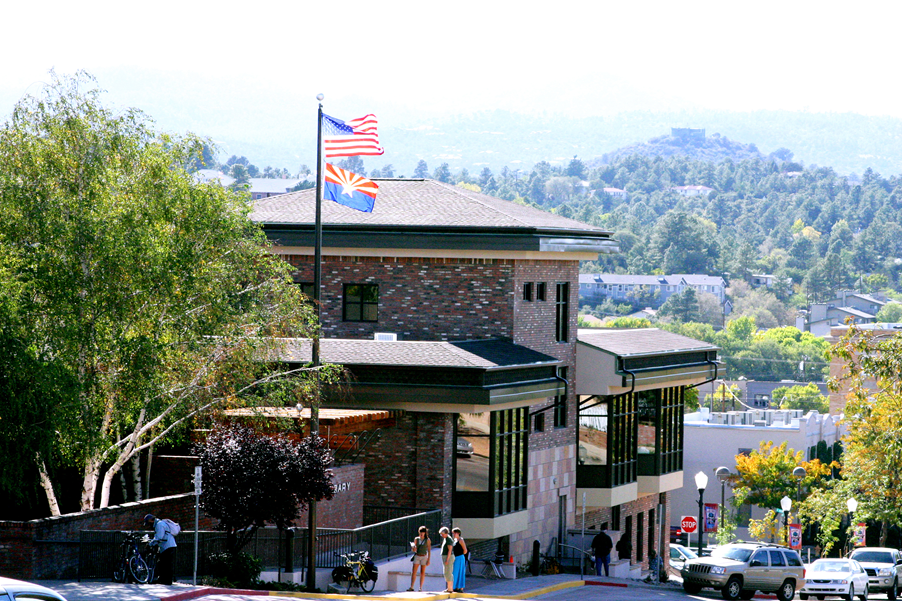
- Prescott Public Library, at 215 Goodwin Street

- Location within Arizona Location within the United States

General information
- Location: 215 E. Goodwin St., Prescott, Arizona
- Coordinates: 34°32′22.6″N 112°27′59.9″W
- Completed: 1974
- Renovated: 2006

Website
- www.prescottlibrary.info

The Prescott Public Library is the public library in Prescott, Arizona.

The original Prescott Public Library was a Carnegie library at 125 E. Gurley Street, which is now an office building. It was the first Carnegie library in Arizona. This building was listed on the U.S. National Register of Historic Places in 1975.

The current library location at 215 E. Goodwin Street was built in 1974 and renovated in 2006. The library sees nearly half a million visitors a year.

== Modern library ==
The current library, built in 1974, is part of the Yavapai Library Network. The library has a vast collection of books, audiobooks on CD, magazines, DVDs, CDs and video games, as well as e-books, e-magazines and downloadable audiobooks. The library also contains other services such as computers, printers, scanners, and fax machines.

The library is decorated with murals depicting Prescott's history that were completed in 2009.

In 2014, working in conjunction with the Tribute Fence Preservation Project and the State Library's Arizona Memory Project, the library opened a digital museum of objects left by visitors paying tribute to the 19 fallen Granite Mountain Hotshots after the Yarnell Hill Fire. The digital collection contains over 10,380 items.
