= Prescott, Arizona =

City in Arizona, United States

Prescott
- City
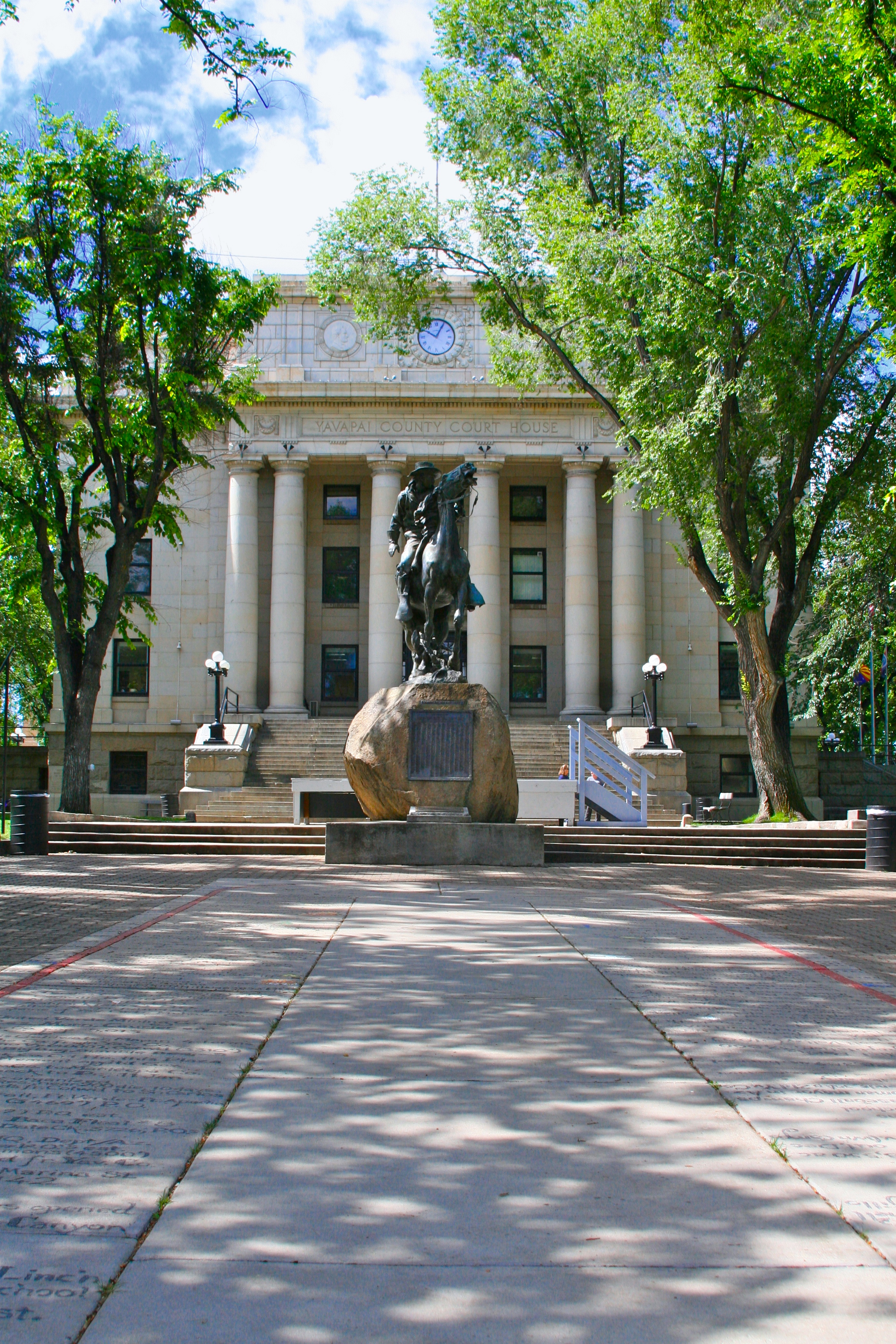
- Courthouse and Buckey O'Neill statue

- Seal Wordmark
- Motto: "Welcome to Everybody's Hometown"
- Location of Prescott in Yavapai County, Arizona

- Location in Arizona Location in United States
- Coordinates: 34°35′07″N 112°26′49″W
- Country: United States
- State: Arizona
- County: Yavapai
- Incorporated: 1881
- Named for: William H. Prescott

Government
  - Type: Council-manager
  - Mayor: Cathey Rusing
  - Mayor Pro Tem: Lois Fruhwirth
  - City council members: Mary Frederickson; Patrick Grady; Jim Garing; Ted Gambogi; Jay Ruby
  - City Manager: Dallin Kimble

Area
  - City: 45.21 sq mi (117.09 km^{2})
  - Land: 44.97 sq mi (116.47 km^{2})
  - Water: 0.24 sq mi (0.62 km^{2})
- Elevation: 5,319 ft (1,621 m)

Population (2020)
  - City: 45,827
  - Density: 1,019.1/sq mi (393.47/km^{2})
  - Metro: 129,643 (Landscan)
- Time zone: UTC−7 (MST (no DST))
- ZIP codes: 86301–86305 & 86318
- Area code: 928
- FIPS code: 04-57380
- GNIS feature ID: 2411487
- Website: www.prescott-az.gov

Prescott (/ˈprɛskət/ PRESS-kət) is a city in and the county seat of Yavapai County, Arizona, United States. As of 2020 Census, the city's population was 45,827.

In 1864, Prescott was designated as the capital of the Arizona Territory, replacing the temporary capital of Fort Whipple. The territorial capital was moved to Tucson in 1867. Prescott again became the territorial capital in 1877, until Phoenix became the capital in 1889.

Prescott has a rich history as a frontier gold and silver mining town. Mining and settlers brought frequent conflict with native American tribes in the area, including the Yavapai and Apache. Prescott was the home to Fort Whipple from its inception, which acted as a base for military operations in the area. Prescott was a stereotypical "wild west" town during the latter half of the 19th century; famous residents included Doc Holliday and Virgil Earp of the gunfight at the O.K. Corral. The wooden town burned to the ground several times in the first decade of the 20th century, which finally resulted in the town being rebuilt in brick. The modern city subsists on tourism, especially around its storied past. It is host to the self-proclaimed "World's Oldest Rodeo", running continuously since 1888. The rodeo, one of the most famous in the United States, draws some 35,000 tourists a year.

The towns of Prescott Valley, 7 miles (11 km) east; Chino Valley, 16 miles (26 km) north; Dewey-Humboldt, 13 miles (21 km) east, and Prescott comprise what is locally known as the "Quad-City" area. This also sometimes refers to central Yavapai County in general, which would include the towns of: Mayer, Paulden, Wilhoit, and Williamson Valley. Combined with these smaller communities, the area had a population of 103,260 as of 2007. Prescott is the center of the Prescott Metropolitan Area, defined by the U.S. Census Bureau as all of Yavapai County.

The Yavapai-Prescott Indian Tribe reservation is adjacent to and partially within the borders of Prescott.

Prescott is in the Granite Creek watershed and contains the convergence of Miller Creek and Granite Creek on its north side.

== History ==
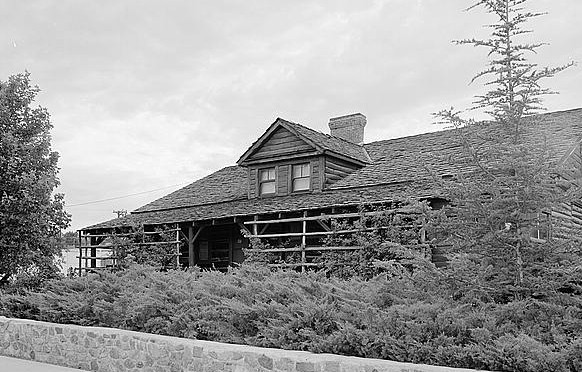
First Territorial Capital and Governor's Mansion, 1864. Now part of Sharlot Hall Museum.

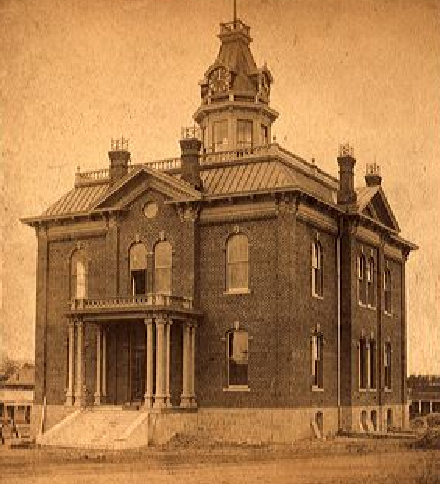
First Prescott Courthouse, c. 1885

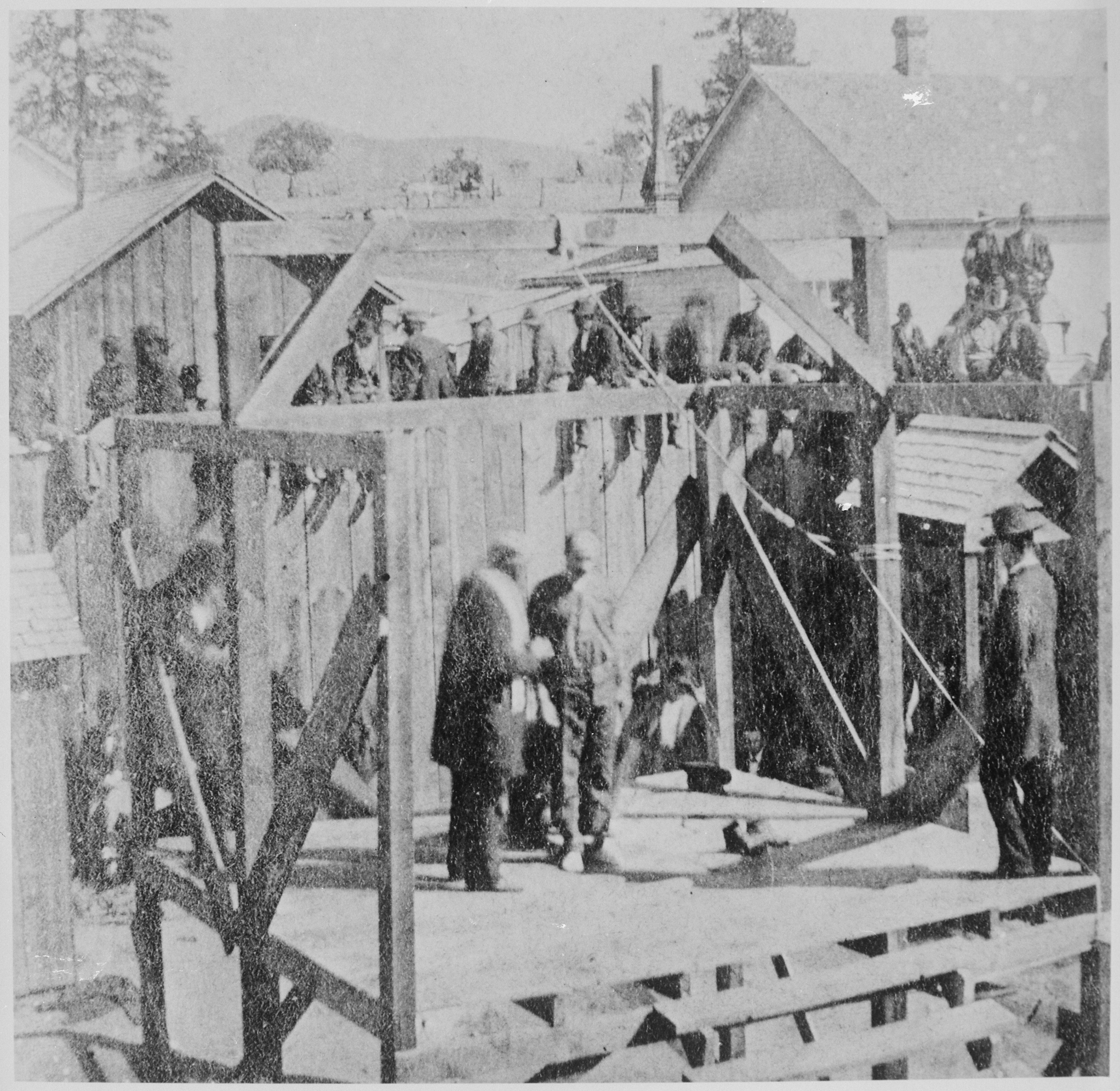
"Execution of a soldier of the 8th Infantry in Prescott, Arizona 1877" is the caption. In fact, it is the execution of Private James Malone of Company K 12th US Infantry in Prescott Arizona March 15, 1878, for his part in a January 1876 murder.

Prescott was originally inhabited by the indigenous Yavapai, who had split off from Patayan groups around 1300 AD. The first recorded European contact with the Yavapai was made by Spaniard Antonio de Espejo in 1583, who was looking for gold. Until the 1860s, there was no permanent European presence. The territory was explored by the Walker Party in 1862 and 1863. Walker and his men discovered gold at Hassayampa Creek, just south of Prescott, in 1863. Further gold was struck at nearby Lynx Creek, Weaver Creek, and Big Bug. With the backing of Ohio railroad magnates, the Arizona Organic Act establishing the Arizona Territory was pushed through in February 1863. The land was now open to settlers. Fort Whipple was established the same year near present day Chino Valley. The fort was also made the territorial capital.

The fort was moved to more mountainous terrain 20 miles (32 km) south the next year. Arizona Territorial Governor John Noble Goodwin selected the site of Prescott following his first tour of the new territory. Goodwin replaced Abraham Lincoln appointee Governor John A. Gurley, who died before taking office. Downtown streets in Prescott are named in honor of both of them. Goodwin selected a site south of the temporary capital on the east side of Granite Creek near a number of mining camps. The new town was named in honor of historian William H. Prescott during a public meeting on May 30, 1864. Robert W. Groom surveyed the new community, and an initial auction sold 73 lots on June 4, 1864. By July 4, 1864, 232 lots had been sold within the new community. Prescott was incorporated in 1881.

The mineral wealth of Prescott included a good quantity of both gold and silver, and made the hamlet the most important city in northern Arizona. It also escalated the American Indian Wars, as pioneers and natives increasingly attacked the other, in ever bloodier reprisals. Tribes also chose sides against each other, with the Maricopa and O'odham fighting alongside American and Mexican settlers against the Yavapai and Apache in brutal campaigns. The Hualapai War broke out in northern Arizona in 1865, which brought a period of guerilla warfare, though few pitched battles. Not until 1935 were the Yavapai given a reservation in Prescott, and at first only a mere 75 acres (30 ha) directly adjacent to Fort Whipple. An extra 1,320 acres (530 ha) were provided in 1956.

The mining camps brought much prosperity, but also much racism. On July 12, 1863, the miners of Lynx Creek passed a resolution banning Asian and Mexican miners. Similar resolutions were passed in the other mining districts. Since there was no extant Mexican population, there was little to temper the racism of new Anglos from the Eastern United States. There were also very few women on the frontier at the time; an 1864 census found just 40. 31 were Mexican, which, combined with the racism of the territory, led to frequent allegations of sexual promiscuity. By the 1870s, as Prescott became increasingly "civilized", it took on the values of Victorian society, including its sexual standards. There were exceptions, however. Mary DeCrow, a white woman, arriving around 1863, had a relationship with a black Texan, breaking taboos around miscegenation. She later married a Mexican blacksmith, starting a boarding house with him; public opinion calmed down after this and she eventually became much loved. Another legendary Prescott woman, Mary Sawyer, wore men's clothes, drank hard, swore hard, and worked a mining claim. Sawyer's breaking of gender norms however resulted in her 1877 institutionalization in an insane asylum, in which she remained until her death in 1902.

Prescott served as capital of Arizona Territory until November 1, 1867, when the capital was moved to Tucson by act of the 4th Arizona Territorial Legislature. The capital was returned to Prescott in 1877 by the 9th Arizona Territorial Legislature. The capital was finally moved to Phoenix on February 4, 1889, by the 15th Arizona Territorial Legislature. The three Arizona Territory capitals reflected the changes in political influence of different regions of the territory as they grew and developed.

Prescott also holds a place in the larger history of the American southwest. Both Virgil Earp (brother of Wyatt Earp) and Doc Holliday lived in Prescott before their now infamous gunfight at the O.K. Corral. Virgil Earp lived in Prescott starting in 1878 as a constable/watchman. Doc Holliday was there for a while in the summer of 1880 and even appears in the 1880 census records.

Whiskey Row in downtown Prescott boasts many historic buildings, including The Palace, Arizona's oldest restaurant and bar. Many other buildings have been converted to boutiques, art galleries, bookstores, and restaurants. Prescott is home to the Arizona Pioneers' Home. The Home opened during territorial days, February 1, 1911.

After several major fires in the early part of the century, downtown Prescott was rebuilt with brick. The central courthouse plaza, a lawn under huge old elm trees, is a gathering and meeting place. Cultural events and performances take place on many nights in the summer on the plaza.

Barry Goldwater, the 1964 Republican nominee for president, launched his presidential campaign from the steps of Prescott's Yavapai County Courthouse.

=== Notable wildfires ===
Yarnell Hill Fire: Nineteen members of the Granite Mountain Hotshots, part of the Prescott Fire Department, died on Sunday, June 30, 2013, while battling the wildfire that had ignited two days earlier south of Prescott.

Goodwin Fire: The wildfire ignited in the Bradshaw Mountains south of Prescott on Saturday, June 24, 2017. The fire eventually led to the evacuations of Mayer and Walker a few days later. State Route 69 was partially closed between the towns of Mayer and Dewey-Humboldt.

== Geography ==
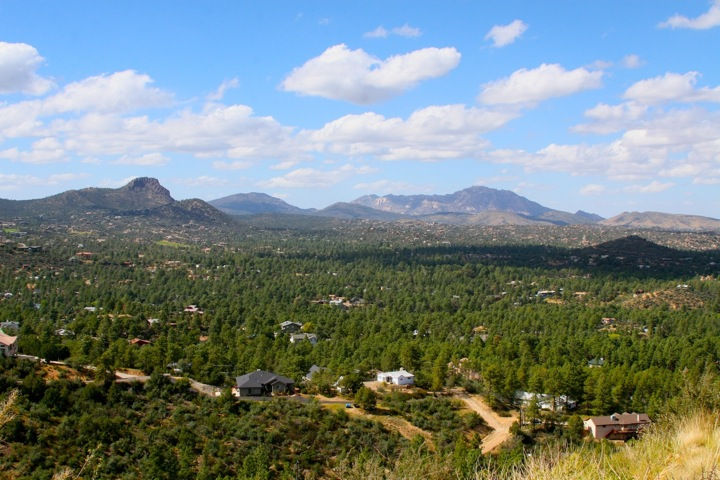
Thumb Butte and Granite Mountain in Prescott

Prescott is 55 mi (89 km) west-northwest of the State of Arizona's geographic center.

According to the United States Census Bureau, the city has a total area of 41.5 sq mi (107.5 km^{2}), of which 40.7 sq mi (105.4 km^{2}) is land and 0.81 sq mi (2.1 km^{2}) is water.

Prescott is considered part of North Central Arizona, sitting just north of the Bradshaw Mountains and east of the Sierra Prieta range. The Granite Dells, often called ‘The Dells’, lies just north of the Prescott city center and is known for its large boulder outcroppings of granite that have eroded into a spectacular appearance of bumpy rock features. Within 'The Dells' are Watson and Willow Lakes, which are two small, man-made reservoirs. Here a number of hiking trails connect to the Peavine Trail. The Peavine National Recreation Trail follows what was the former rail bed of the Santa Fe, Prescott and Phoenix Railway. This railroad traveled from Prescott to Phoenix through the Granite Dells. The "Peavine" got its name from the winding portion of this railroad that twists and curves, resembling the vine on which peas grow. The Peavine trail connects to the Iron King Trail, which was the route of the old Prescott and Eastern Railroad through the Granite Dells. Other lakes include Lynx, Granite Basin and Goldwater, all surrounding different areas of this rustic community. Goldwater Lake, by Goldwater Park, is 4 miles (6.4 km) from downtown Prescott, has 15 acres (6.1 ha) of water surface, and is a popular destination for park recreation and picnic facilities. Lynx Lake is another lake close to Prescott in tall ponderosa pines, and gets some 125,000 visitors every year. This 55-acre (22 ha) lake offers visitors recreational activities, boating, camping, fishing, hiking, mountain biking, picnicking and a small, seasonal restaurant with a view of the lake. Finally, there is the smallest of the natural lakes with 5 acres (2.0 ha) of surface water at Granite Basin Lake. None of these lakes permit swimming due to a history of water quality problems, however all are popular recreational destinations near Prescott.

Granite Creek flows generally north from the Bradshaw Mountains through the city, the Granite Dells, and the Little Chino Valley to the Verde River.

=== Climate ===
Prescott is in the Bradshaw Mountains of central Arizona, at an elevation of 5,400 feet (1,600 m). The city has a Mediterranean climate (Köppen Csa). However, unlike most other locations in this climate class, there is a pronounced summer wet season due to the North American Monsoon.

Average annual precipitation for 1991 to 2020 was 16.46 inches (418 mm), with spring and early summer the driest times of the year, while the largest portion of precipitation falls during the July–September monsoon season. The wettest "rain year" was from July 1919 to June 1920 with 34.87 inches or 885.7 millimetres and the driest from July 2020 to June 2021 with 7.39 inches or 187.7 millimetres. Snowfall is typically light and snow cover usually melts away quickly; the average seasonal total is 10.2 inches (0.26 m), although as much as 97.1 inches (2.5 m) fell between July 1931 and June 1932, and a monthly total of 53.0 inches (1.3 m) occurred in January 1949. Average daytime temperatures remain above 50 °F (10 °C) the entire year, but diurnal temperature variation is large throughout the year, averaging nearly 30 °F (16.7 °C) annually. On average, temperatures reach 90 °F (32.2 °C) on 44 days annually, though 100 °F (37.8 °C)+ readings are uncommon and occur only 1–2 days per year on average, much unlike the Sonoran Desert to the south and Mojave Desert to the west. The average season for freezing temperatures is October 21 through May 1.

Temperature extremes are fairly widespread. The warmest measured temperature in Prescott is 105 °F (40.6 °C) on two separate occasions (1925 and 2021). The coldest low was measured in 1937 and stood at −21 °F (−29 °C). Due to the large diurnal temperature variation, cold winter days are rare, but being far inland causes a variability which occasionally leads to ice days. The coldest maximum on record is 20 °F (−6.7 °C) in February 1905 and a normal year between 1991 and 2020 saw the coldest day of the year not rise above 33 °F or 0.6 °C. Warm summer nights are rare due to being on an elevated plain, but happen on occasion. The warmest on record is 79 °F (26.1 °C) in August 1904, whereas a normal year has a more modest 69 °F (20.6 °C) for the highest low.

There was a severe drought from 1999 to 2009, seen from the lack of snowpack in the Bradshaw Mountains. Local creeks do not contain water except immediately after the rare rains. Nevertheless, at the start of 2007 lakes were reported as full. The winter of 2008–09 had only a trace of snow, compared to an average snowfall of 12.8 inches (0.33 m).

Climate data for Prescott, Arizona (1991–2020 normals, extremes 1898–present)
Month	Jan	Feb	Mar	Apr	May	Jun	Jul	Aug	Sep	Oct	Nov	Dec	Year
Record high °F (°C)	73 (23)	77 (25)	83 (28)	89 (32)	97 (36)	105 (41)	105 (41)	103 (39)	98 (37)	94 (34)	83 (28)	78 (26)	105 (41)
Mean maximum °F (°C)	64.8 (18.2)	67.8 (19.9)	73.8 (23.2)	81.4 (27.4)	88.5 (31.4)	96.4 (35.8)	98.5 (36.9)	95.4 (35.2)	91.0 (32.8)	84.8 (29.3)	74.7 (23.7)	65.8 (18.8)	99.6 (37.6)
Mean daily maximum °F (°C)	52.6 (11.4)	55.2 (12.9)	61.2 (16.2)	67.8 (19.9)	76.3 (24.6)	87.0 (30.6)	89.6 (32.0)	87.2 (30.7)	82.4 (28.0)	72.9 (22.7)	61.6 (16.4)	51.9 (11.1)	70.5 (21.4)
Daily mean °F (°C)	38.2 (3.4)	40.8 (4.9)	46.4 (8.0)	52.5 (11.4)	60.7 (15.9)	70.3 (21.3)	75.3 (24.1)	73.5 (23.1)	67.3 (19.6)	56.5 (13.6)	45.7 (7.6)	37.7 (3.2)	55.4 (13.0)
Mean daily minimum °F (°C)	23.8 (−4.6)	26.4 (−3.1)	31.6 (−0.2)	37.3 (2.9)	45.0 (7.2)	53.6 (12.0)	61.0 (16.1)	59.7 (15.4)	52.2 (11.2)	40.1 (4.5)	29.8 (−1.2)	23.6 (−4.7)	40.3 (4.6)
Mean minimum °F (°C)	11.9 (−11.2)	15.1 (−9.4)	20.5 (−6.4)	26.4 (−3.1)	32.5 (0.3)	42.3 (5.7)	52.6 (11.4)	52.3 (11.3)	40.8 (4.9)	28.2 (−2.1)	17.9 (−7.8)	11.8 (−11.2)	9.2 (−12.7)
Record low °F (°C)	−21 (−29)	−12 (−24)	2 (−17)	11 (−12)	20 (−7)	28 (−2)	34 (1)	32 (0)	26 (−3)	13 (−11)	−1 (−18)	−9 (−23)	−21 (−29)
Average precipitation inches (mm)	1.52 (39)	1.78 (45)	1.46 (37)	0.57 (14)	0.51 (13)	0.23 (5.8)	2.69 (68)	2.78 (71)	1.64 (42)	0.96 (24)	0.87 (22)	1.45 (37)	16.46 (417.8)
Average snowfall inches (cm)	1.9 (4.8)	3.1 (7.9)	2.5 (6.4)	0.4 (1.0)	0.0 (0.0)	0.0 (0.0)	0.0 (0.0)	0.0 (0.0)	0.0 (0.0)	0.0 (0.0)	0.9 (2.3)	1.4 (3.6)	10.2 (26)
Average precipitation days (≥ 0.01 in)	5.6	5.9	5.4	3.2	3.0	1.6	9.9	9.9	5.9	3.9	3.8	5.1	63.2
Average snowy days (≥ 0.1 in)	1.2	1.2	0.8	0.3	0.0	0.0	0.0	0.0	0.0	0.0	0.4	1.3	5.2
Average relative humidity (%)	57	53	42	33	30	23	41	44	42	42	47	58	43
Mean daily sunshine hours	6.8	8.8	9.0	10.6	11.8	12.1	11.9	12.0	9.8	8.1	7.3	6.7	9.6
Mean daily daylight hours	10.2	11.0	12.0	13.1	14.0	14.4	14.2	13.4	12.4	11.3	10.4	9.9	12.2
Average ultraviolet index	3	4	6	9	11	12	12	11	9	6	4	3	8
Source 1: NOAA
Source 2: Weather Atlas (UV and humidity)

=== Monsoon season ===
Prescott is affected each year by the North American Monsoon. Monsoon season is June 15 – Sep 15, and brings significant rain, wind, hail, thunderstorms, and flooding to the area. In spite of the dangers of flash floods and wildfires, many locals enjoy monsoon season for the relief of cooler temperatures, which commonly result from storms during the height of summer heatwaves.

Arizona receives half of its annual rainfall during monsoon season, but this can be misleading. Monthly averages in precipitation can give the false impression that rains are confined to monsoon season, while single-day annual rainfall records have been set far outside of monsoon season, repeatedly. The area is prone to weather extremes and often, monthly rainfall records are actually the result of one or two dramatic rain events.

=== Flood risk ===
Prescott area residents have faced the challenges of extreme rain and flash flooding since the first prospectors arrived in search of gold in the late 1800s. In 1863 Joseph R. Walker's original mining camp on the banks of Lynx Creek was completely swept away in a flash flood less than a year after arriving in Prescott. In the late 1880s, floods destroyed the first dam on Lynx creek near present-day SR-69. 1891 brought the heaviest flooding on record across Arizona (a record broken in 1993), carving lasting changes to the Verde river drainage, bordering Prescott. The Verde, which has in some years been completely dry, gushed with 4,284 cubic meters per second of water on February 24, 1891, or about half the size of the Columbia river.

Tropical Storm Octave, in 1983, brought 14.5" of rain to parts of Prescott in less than forty-eight hours. Damages included the Santa Fe Railway, which was washed out in so many places it was completely abandoned the following year. Two Prescott area college students died in Granite Creek during flooding in 2004, which brought an official state of emergency declaration from state governor Napolitano. Significant flooding has been recorded as recently as 2018, prompting the evacuation of nearby Mayer in August.

A large number of homes in Prescott are located within FEMA designated "high risk flood zones A and AE". The City of Prescott recently updated Flood Insurance Rate Maps in response to increased construction and notable flooding for several consecutive years.

== Demographics ==
Historical population
Census	Pop.	Note	%±
1870	668		—
1880	1,836		174.9%
1890	1,759		−4.2%
1900	3,559		102.3%
1910	5,092		43.1%
1920	5,010		−1.6%
1930	5,517		10.1%
1940	6,018		9.1%
1950	6,764		12.4%
1960	12,861		90.1%
1970	13,631		6.0%
1980	19,865		45.7%
1990	26,455		33.2%
2000	33,938		28.3%
2010	39,843		17.4%
2020	45,827		15.0%
U.S. Decennial Census

=== Racial and ethnic composition ===
Prescott city, Arizona – Racial composition Note: the US Census treats Hispanic/Latino as an ethnic category. This table excludes Latinos from the racial categories and assigns them to a separate category. Hispanics/Latinos may be of any race.
Race (NH = Non-Hispanic)	% 2020	% 2010	% 2000	Pop 2020	Pop 2010	Pop 2000
White alone (NH)	83.3%	87.1%	88.2%	38,174	34,690	29,941
Black alone (NH)	0.7%	0.6%	0.4%	307	242	149
American Indian alone (NH)	0.8%	0.9%	1.1%	350	358	376
Asian alone (NH)	1.7%	1.2%	0.8%	788	481	279
Pacific Islander alone (NH)	0.1%	0.1%	0.1%	43	45	17
Other race alone (NH)	0.4%	0.1%	0.1%	196	38	25
Multiracial (NH)	3.8%	1.4%	1.1%	1,744	547	378
Hispanic/Latino (any race)	9.2%	8.6%	8.2%	4,225	3,442	2,773

=== 2020 census ===
As of the 2020 census, Prescott had a population of 45,827. The median age was 60.2 years. 10.8% of residents were under the age of 18 and 41.1% of residents were 65 years of age or older. For every 100 females there were 96.7 males, and for every 100 females age 18 and over there were 95.8 males age 18 and over.

95.6% of residents lived in urban areas, while 4.4% lived in rural areas.

There were 21,884 households in Prescott, of which 12.7% had children under the age of 18 living in them. Of all households, 46.0% were married-couple households, 19.9% were households with a male householder and no spouse or partner present, and 28.4% were households with a female householder and no spouse or partner present. About 35.7% of all households were made up of individuals and 21.8% had someone living alone who was 65 years of age or older.

There were 25,367 housing units, of which 13.7% were vacant. The homeowner vacancy rate was 1.9% and the rental vacancy rate was 8.8%.

The most reported ancestries in 2020 were English (23.6%), German (21.1%), Irish (17.3%), Mexican (6.5%), Italian (5.6%), and Scottish (5.2%).

Racial composition as of the 2020 census
Race	Number	Percent
White	39,487	86.2%
Black or African American	331	0.7%
American Indian and Alaska Native	471	1.0%
Asian	817	1.8%
Native Hawaiian and Other Pacific Islander	45	0.1%
Some other race	1,137	2.5%
Two or more races	3,539	7.7%
Hispanic or Latino (of any race)	4,225	9.2%

=== 2000 census ===
As of the census of 2000, there were 33,938 people, 15,098 households, and 8,968 families residing in the city. The population density was 915.6/sq mi (353.5/km^{2}). There were 17,144 housing units at an average density of 462.5/sq mi (178.6/km^{2}). The racial makeup of the city was 92.9% White, 0.5% Black or African American, 1.3% Native American, 0.8% Asian, 0.1% Pacific Islander, 2.8% from other races, and 1.6% from two or more races. 8.2% of the population were Hispanic or Latino of any race.

There were 15,098 households, out of which 18.1% had children under the age of 18 living with them, 48.7% were married couples living together, 7.9% had a female householder with no husband present, and 40.6% were non-families. 32.1% of all households were made up of individuals, and 15.2% had someone living alone who was 65 years of age or older. The average household size was 2.11 and the average family size was 2.62.

In the city, the population was spread out, with 15.9% under the age of 18, 11.2% from 18 to 24, 18.9% from 25 to 44, 27.3% from 45 to 64, and 26.8% who were 65 years of age or older. The median age was 48 years. For every 100 females, there were 96.9 males. For every 100 females age 18 and over, there were 94.3 males.

The median income for a household in the city was $35,446, and the median income for a family was $46,481. Males had a median income of $31,834 versus $22,982 for females. The per capita income for the city was $22,565. About 7.4% of families and 13.1% of the population were below the poverty line, including 14.4% of those under age 18 and 6.4% of those age 65 or over.

== Economy ==
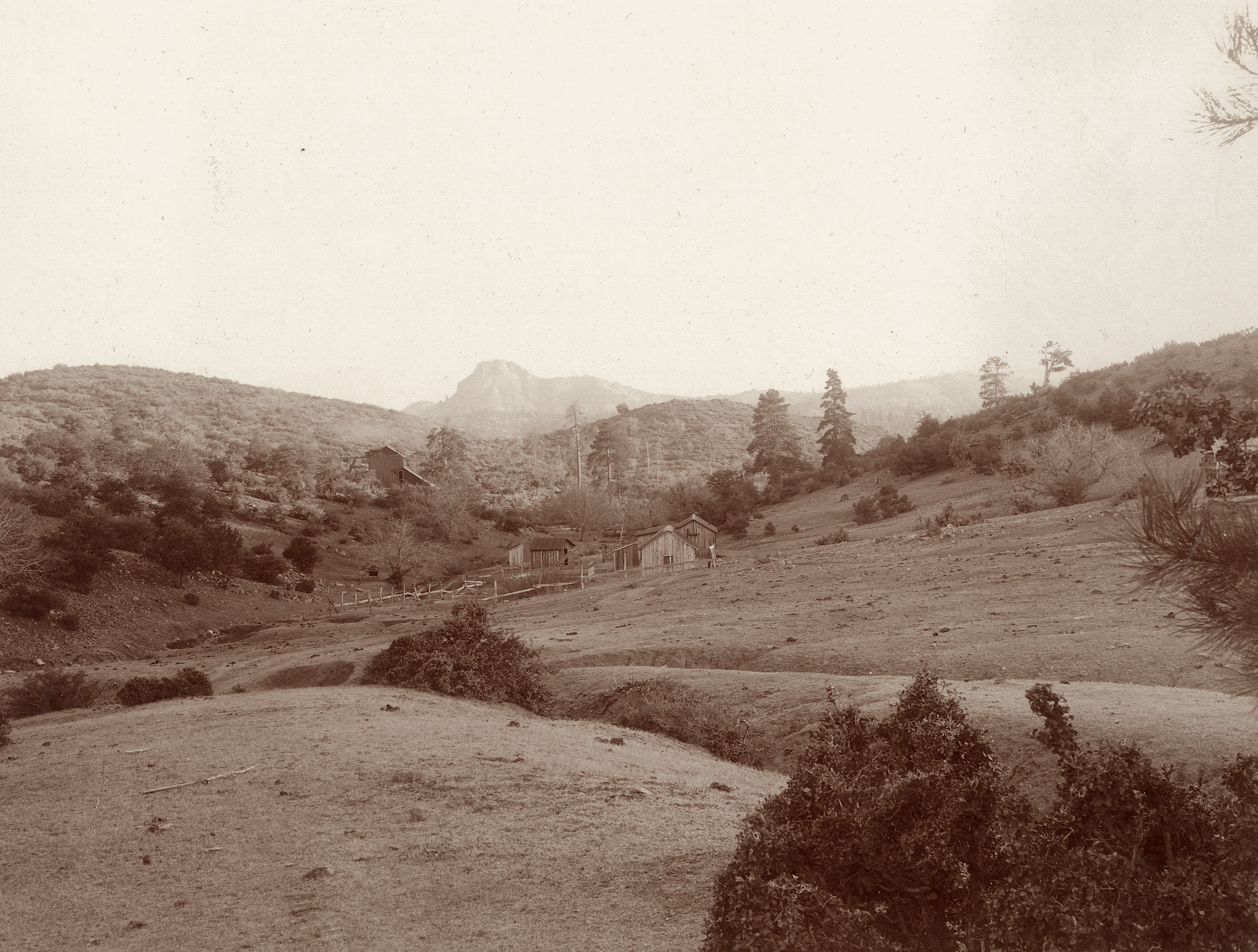
The Derby Mine mill & camp, one of the many gold and silver mines in Prescott around the turn of the century. Taken 1901. Thumb Butte is visible in the far background.

The Pineridge Marketplace, (formerly the Prescott Gateway Mall) is an enclosed shopping mall that opened in 2002, replacing Ponderosa Plaza, which was Prescott's first enclosed mall when it opened in 1980.

Downtown Prescott has dozens of independently owned and operated shops.

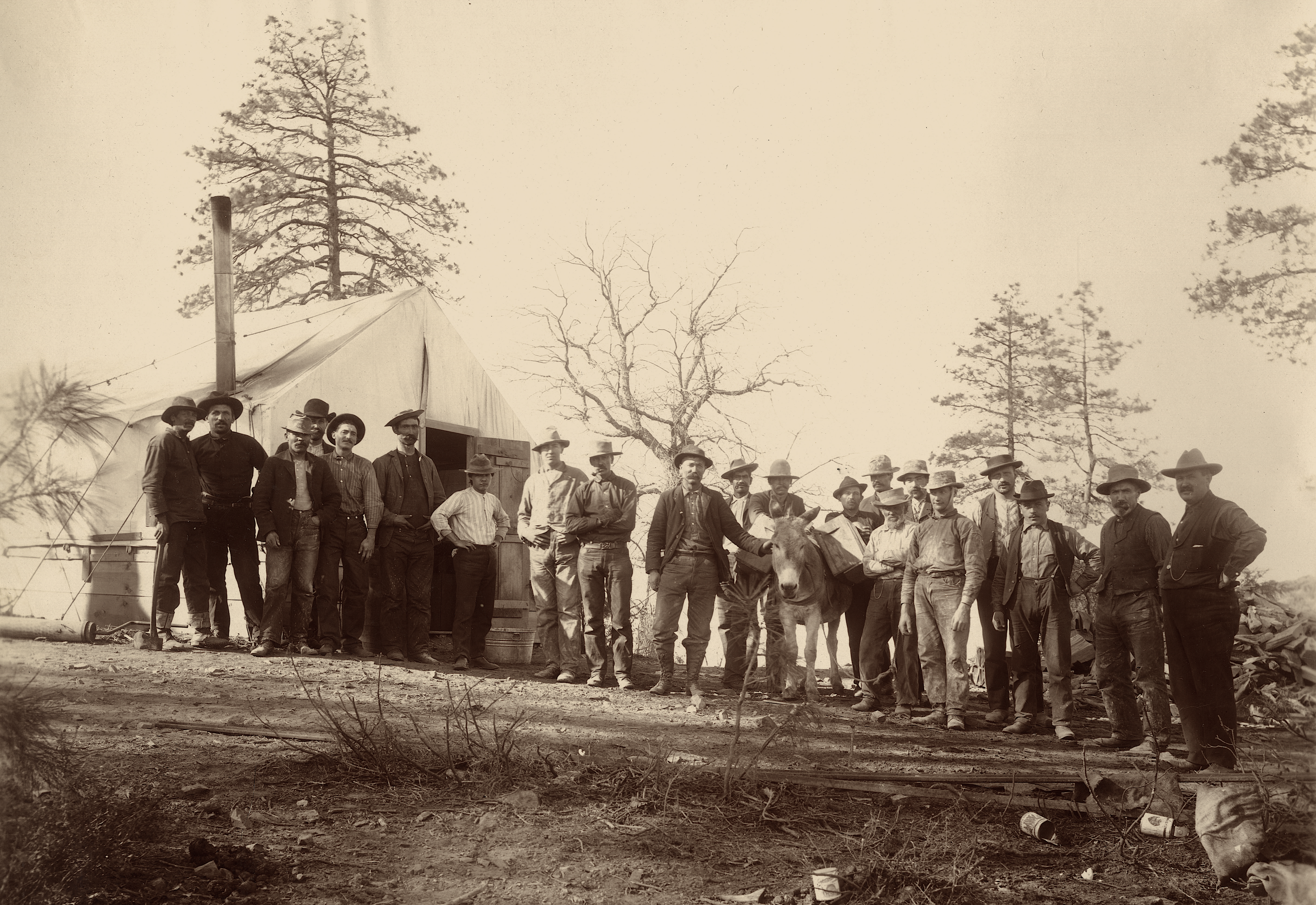
Men from the Derby Mine, 1905

Prescott is home to a Pure Wafer silicon foundry.

=== Top employers ===
According to the city's 2021 Comprehensive Annual Financial Report, the top employers in Prescott are:

#	Employer	# of employees
1	Yavapai Regional Medical Center	2,094
2	Yavapai County	1,750
3	Northern Arizona VA Health Care System	1,300
4	Yavapai College	1,290
5	Embry–Riddle Aeronautical University, Prescott	650
6	Walmart	575
7	City of Prescott	518
8	Prescott Unified School District	457
9	Sturm, Ruger & Co.	400
10	Polara Health	305

Other major area employers include the Yavapai-Prescott Tribe, the James Family Prescott YMCA, and Fann Contracting.

== Places of interest and culture ==
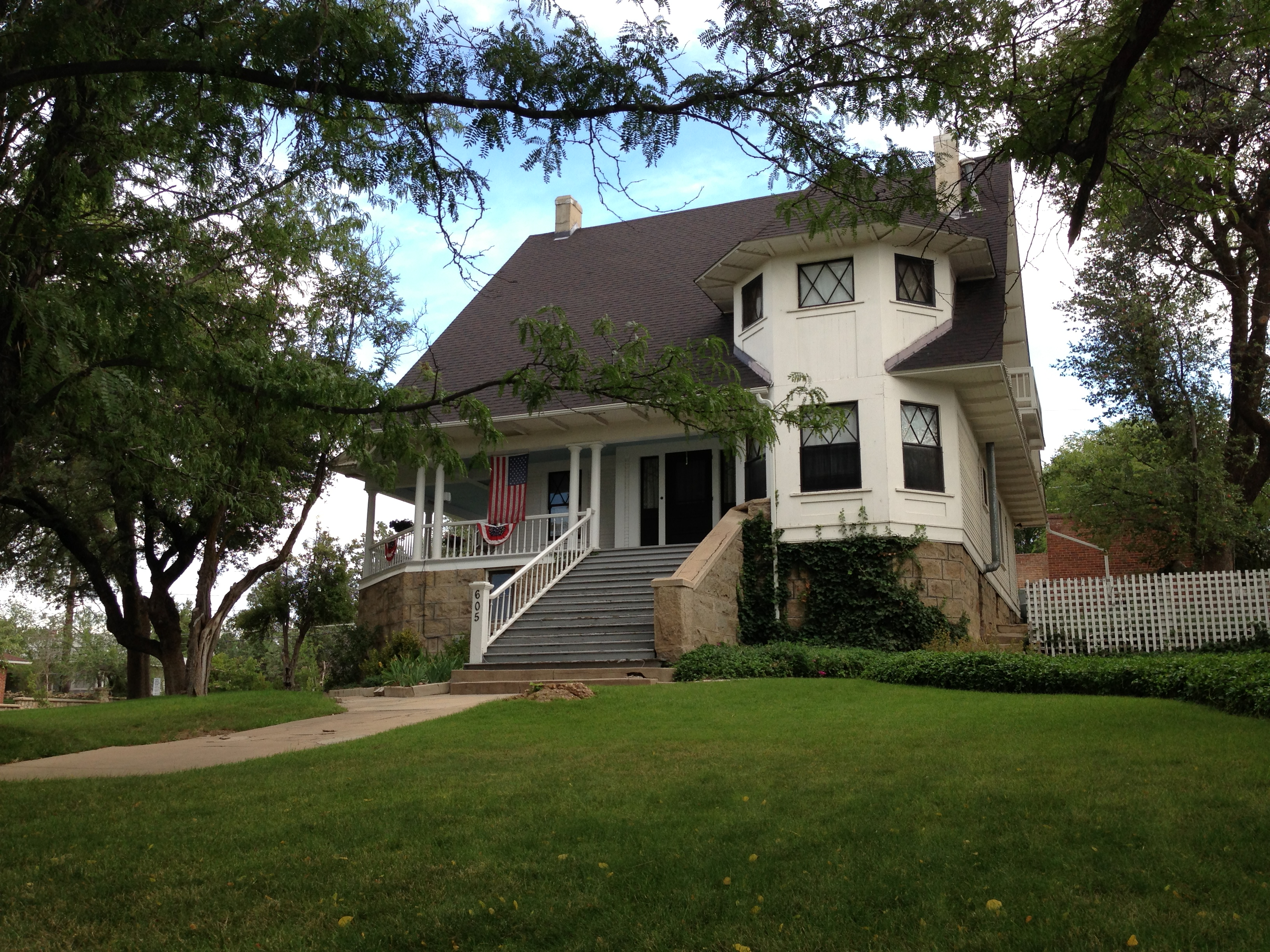
Brinkmeyer House, listed on the National Register of Historic Places

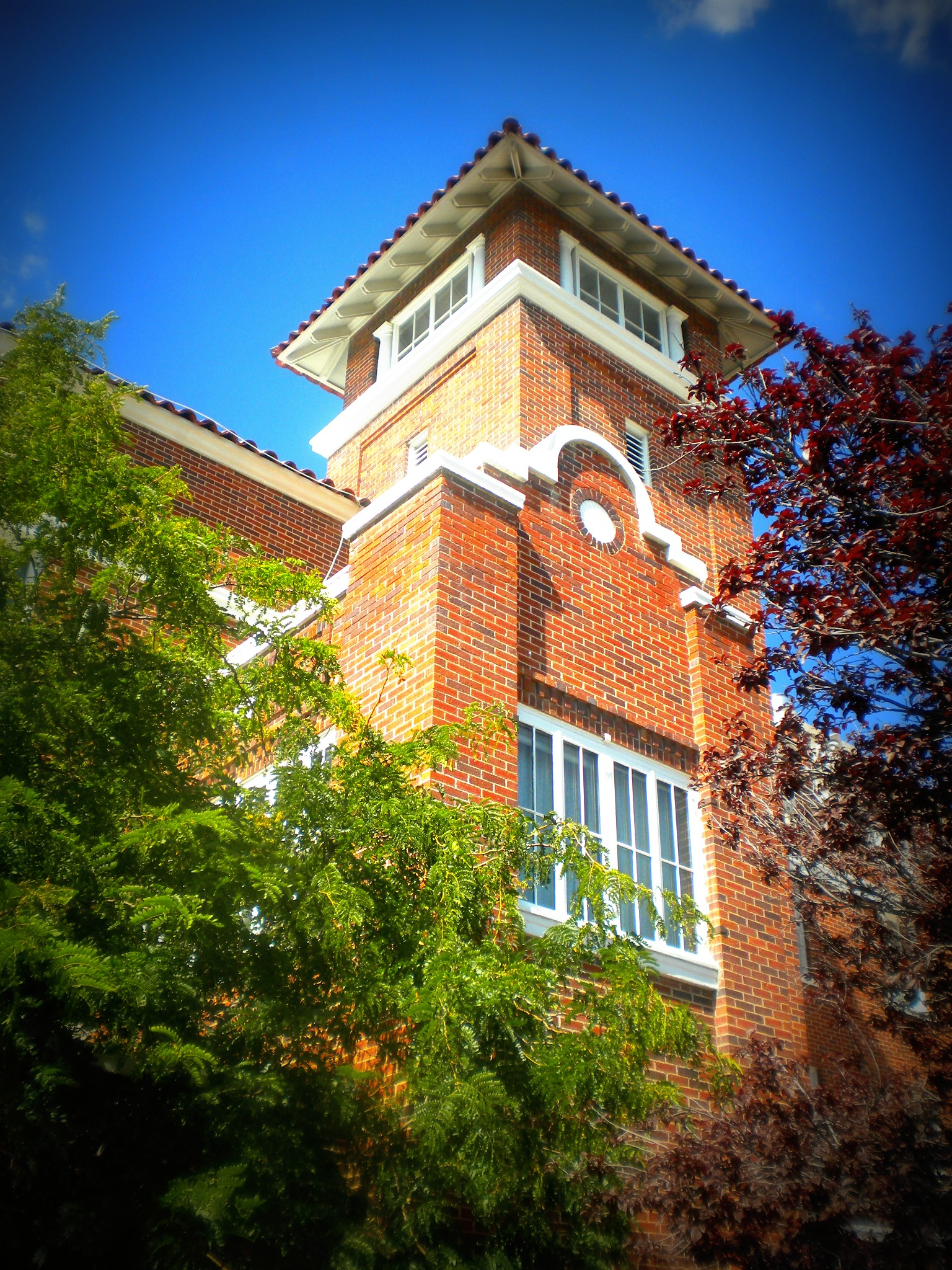
Hassayampa Hotel, built 1927. Henry Trost, architect.

The Sharlot Hall Museum houses much of Prescott's territorial history, and the Museum of Indigenous People (formerly the Smoki museum) and Phippen Museum also maintains local collections.

Prescott has many Victorian style homes. Prescott has 809 buildings on the National Register of Historic Places. The tallest house in North America, Falcon Nest is in Prescott, on the slope of Thumb Butte. The Museum of Indigenous People is housed in a distinctive stone building within the Prescott Armory Historic District.

Prescott is home to the downtown historical area known as Whiskey Row. Adjacent to Whiskey Row was the red-light district which operated until 1917, at which point prostitution was outlawed in the state of Arizona. In 1900, a great fire destroyed almost all of the buildings on Whiskey Row, including the 1891 Hotel Burke, advertised as "the only absolutely fireproof building in Prescott". By legend, the patrons of the various bars simply took their drinks across the street to the Courthouse square and watched it burn. At the time of the fire, patrons removed the entire bar and back-bar of the Palace Restaurant & Saloon to the square as the fire approached, re-installing it after the gutted brick structure was rebuilt. Whiskey Row runs north and south on Montezuma St. between Gurley and Goodwin St., directly west of the county courthouse. This single city block has been the home of the St. Michael's Hotel (formerly the Hotel Burke) and the Palace Hotel since the late 19th century, along with other colorful purveyors of nightlife. Originally built in 1877, The Palace Restaurant and Saloon was rebuilt after the fire, and is now the state's oldest continuous business. Merchant Sam Hill's large hardware store was near Whiskey Row.

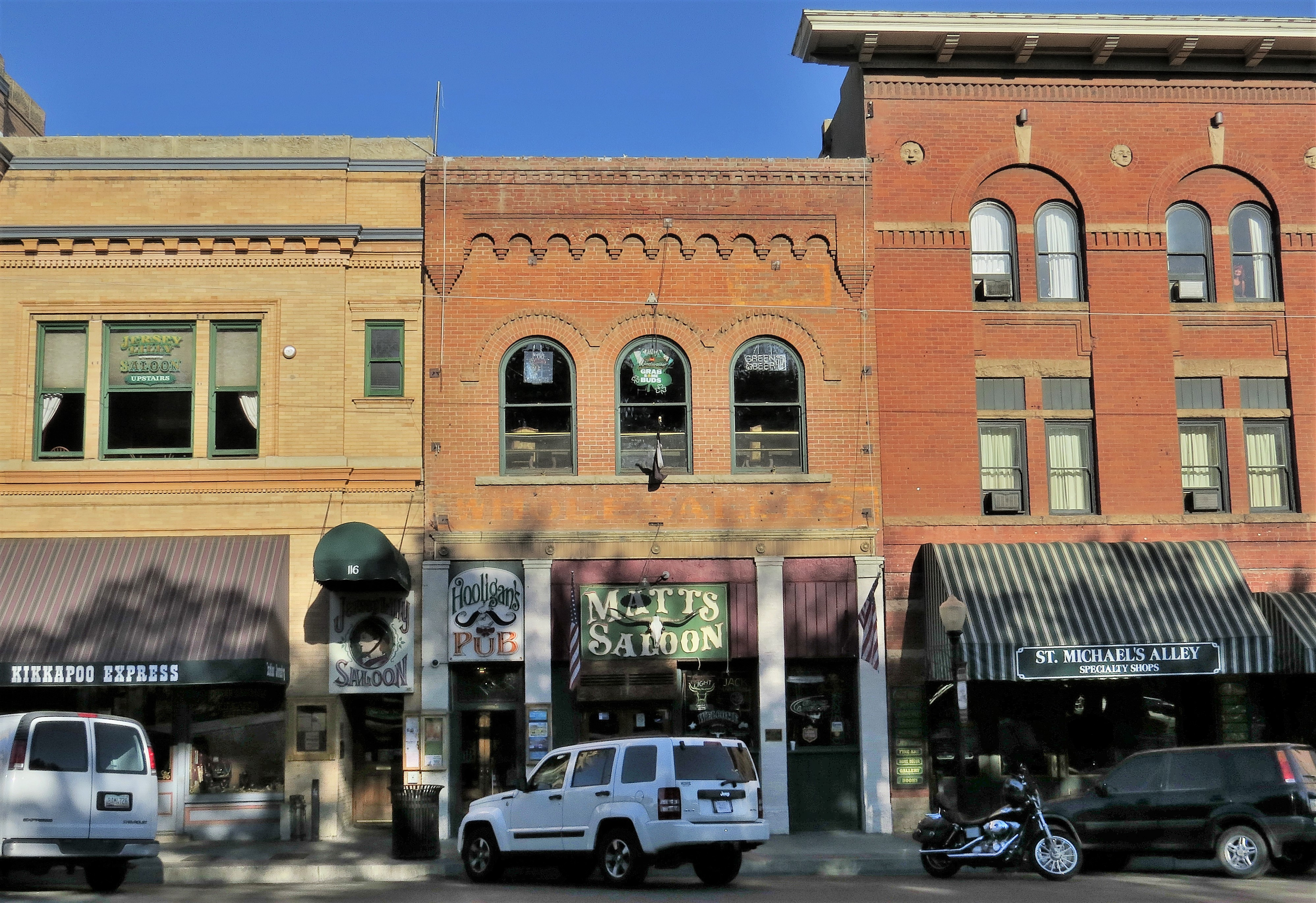
Whiskey Row

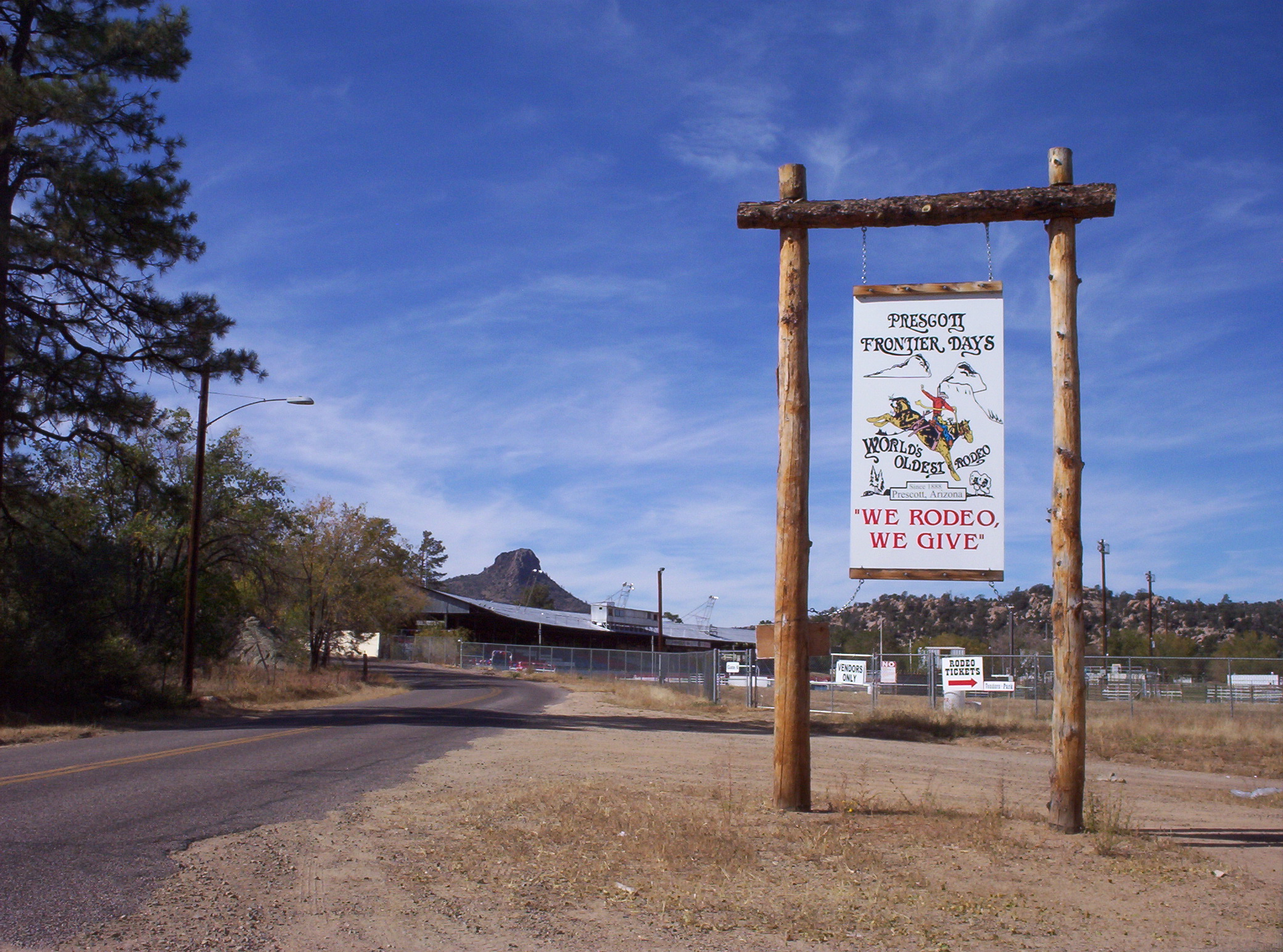
Rodeo grounds

Prescott is host to the self-proclaimed "World's Oldest Rodeo", running continuously since 1888. Also known as "Frontier Days", it runs in the days leading up to Fourth of July. It is one of the most famous rodeos in the United States. In the 2010s, it drew over 35,000 tourists a year, nearly doubling Prescott's population for the rodeo week. During the same period, some 45,000 people also attend the Rodeo Parade, which winds through downtown Prescott. Though several other rodeos pre-date Prescott's by decades, Prescott claims it was the first to charge admission and turn it into a spectator sport. This is backed up by a 1985 trademark on "World's Oldest Rodeo". The rodeo was featured in the 1972 film Junior Bonner.

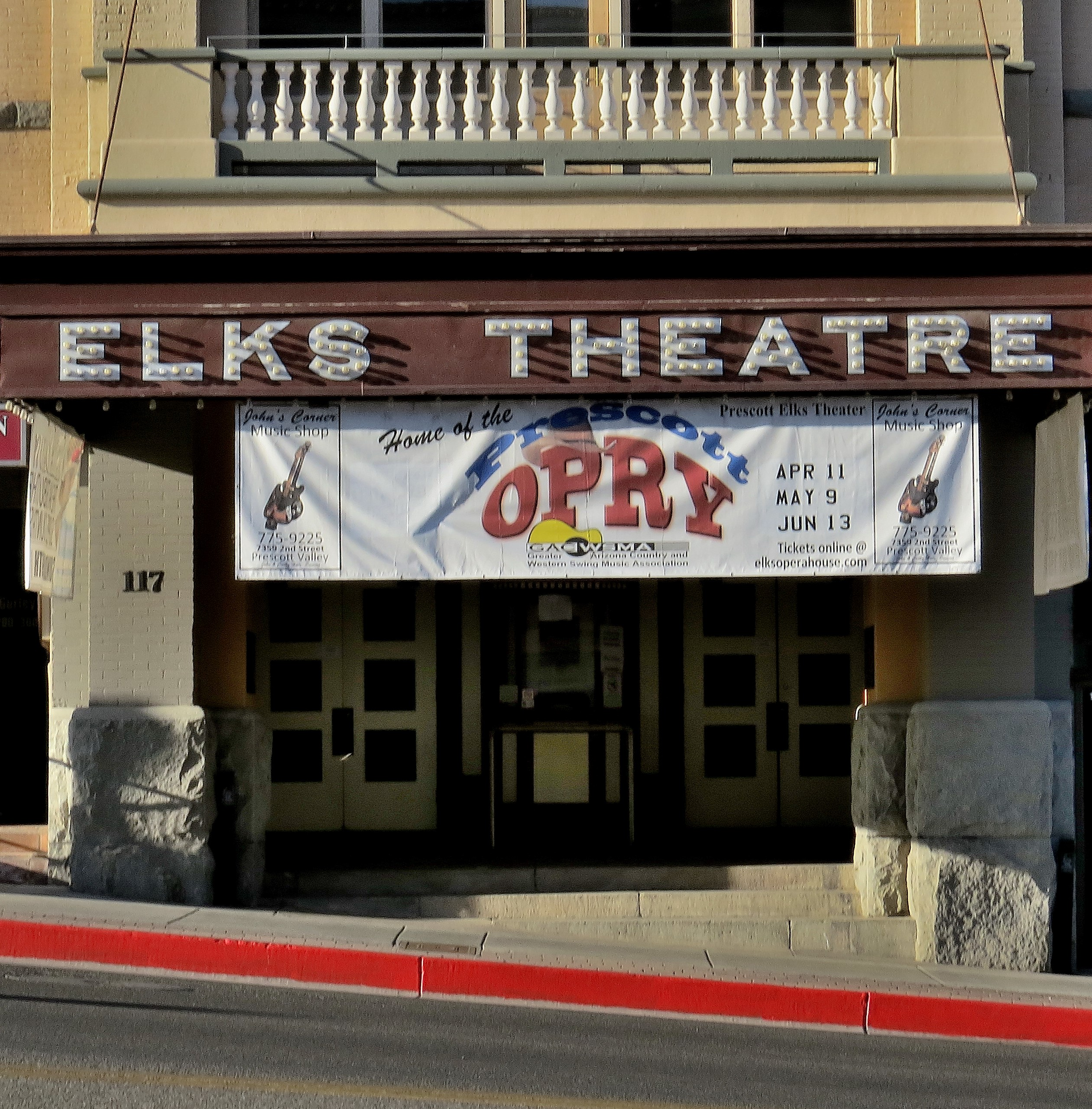
Elks Theatre Performing Arts Center (formerly Elks Opera House)

Prescott hosts annual events such as Frontier Days, Easter Egg-Stravaganza, the Bluegrass Festival, Earth Day, July 4 Celebration, Tsunami on the Square, art festivals, a Cinco de Mayo celebration, Navajo Rug Auction, Pumpkin Patch Carnival, World's Largest Gingerbread Village at the Prescott Resort & Conference center (on the Yavapai-Prescott Indian Tribe reservation), Prescott Film Festival, Folk Arts Fair, parades, the Acker Music Festival, The Cowboy Poets Gathering, the Prescott Highland Games, Courthouse Lighting, Whiskey Off Road and Ragnar Relay Del Sol. On New Year's Eve, historic Whiskey Row saw the inaugural Prescott Boot Drop to usher in the 2012 New Year. The illuminated 6-foot (1.8 m) tall cowboy boot with multi-colored stars was lowered from the historic Palace Restaurant rooftop's 40-foot (12 m) flagpole to the delight and cheers of celebrants gathered on Montezuma Street which was closed for the occasion. Also in Prescott is the Heritage Park Zoo.

There are four golf courses within the city limits: Antelope Hills Golf Course, which consist of the City of Prescott South Course and the City of Prescott North Course, Capital Canyon Golf Club (formerly the Hassayampa Golf Club) (private), Talking Rock Golf Club (private), and Prescott Lakes Golf Club (private). More public courses are located nearby in surrounding towns.

Prescott is home to The Arizona Pioneers' Home, a continuing care retirement home, operated and funded by the State of Arizona, originally intended for impoverished Arizona founders from Territorial days. Initially the home was built to house 40 men, but in 1916 an addition of a women's wing was completed to provide for 20 women. Later, in 1929, the home again expanded to include Arizona's Hospital for Disabled Miners (current total capacity is 150 beds). Scenes from the 2008 movie Jolene were filmed in the Pioneer's Home in 2006. The Home has had many colorful residents, including a John Miller, who claimed to be Billy the Kid, and who was exhumed from the Pioneer's Home Cemetery in 2005 in an attempt to identify DNA evidence. Another resident was "Big Nose Kate" Elder, who would also be laid to rest in the Pioneer's Home Cemetery, though not without controversy.

Prescott is home to Prescott College, a small liberal arts college just west of the downtown area that emphasizes environmental and social justice. It is a non-profit organization which has an undergraduate body of roughly 800 students, and an average student to faculty ratio of 7:1 in on-campus classrooms. There are four general programs at Prescott College: the On-campus Undergraduate Program (RDP), Limited-Residency Undergraduate Degree Program (ADP), the Limited-Residency Master of Arts Program (MAP), and a Limited-Residency PhD program in Sustainability Education. Those enrolled in the Limited-Residency programs work with various mentors and Prescott College faculty, usually in their home communities. On-campus students live in Prescott and attend classes at the college itself.

Prescott was at one point a recovery destination, with over 200 sober living homes dedicated to drug or alcohol recovery. However, increased regulation and enforcement has whittled the number down to less than 30 as of June 2018.

The cultures of Prescott's recovery community, the students at Prescott College, and preexisting small town punk subculture have fostered a thriving punk scene. Shows are hosted weekly at house venues, tattoo shops, and bars throughout downtown and the Dexter neighborhood. The official live music video for the Rail Yard Ghosts song entitled My Country//Black Flags was filmed at local neighborhood house venue known as the Witch Hut.This was also the site of 2017's Celestial Fest, which brought several notable Folk-Punk bands including Apes of the State. Prescott has been home to several nationally known punk bands, including Bueno, Life in Pictures, and Hour of the Wolf. Local bands often play shows alongside touring bands, who include Prescott in their tours.

Prescott was the location of Arizona's first Elks Lodge (BPOE). In December 1895 a group of enterprising businessmen in Prescott established the Prescott Elks Lodge #330, known as the "Mother Lodge of Arizona". The Prescott Elks Opera House was built by the lodge in 1905. The Prescott Elks Lodge is in Prescott Valley.

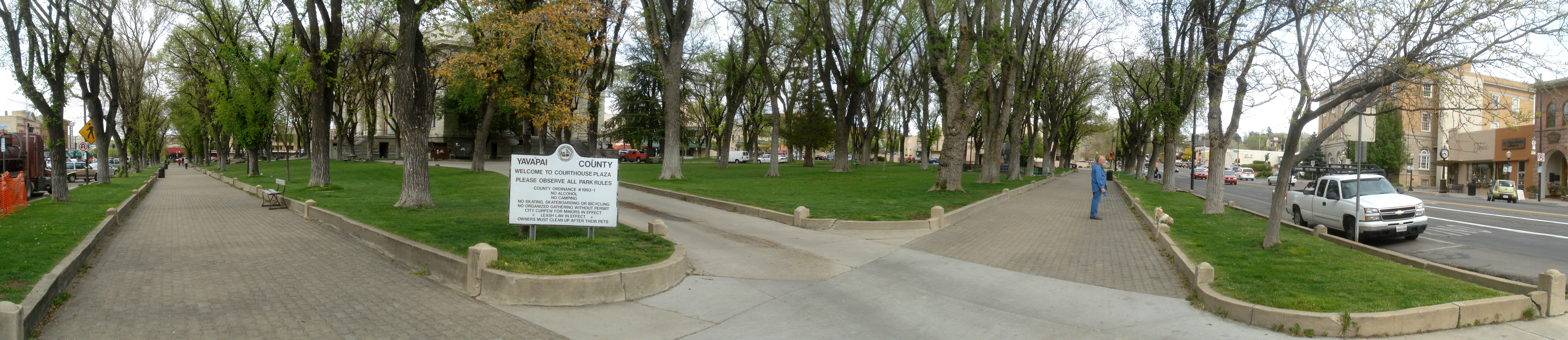
A panorama of the Courthouse square in downtown Prescott

=== Designations ===
Prescott was designated "Arizona's Christmas City" by Arizona Governor Rose Mofford in 1989.

Other notable designations include:

2000: Downtown Historic Preservation District (which includes "Whiskey Row") – one of 12 such National Register Historic Districts within the city.

2004: A "Preserve American Community" in 2004 by First Lady Laura Bush.

2006: One of a "Dozen Distinctive Destinations" by the National Trust for Historic Preservation.

2008: Yavapai Courthouse Plaza recognized as one of the first ten "Great Public Places" in America by the American Planning Association.

2012: Number 1 True Western Town of the Year for 2011 by True West Magazine and One of the 61 Best Old House Neighborhoods in the U.S and Canada by This Old House Magazine.

== Government ==
The City of Prescott operates under a council-manager form of government. The council has six council members and a mayor, all elected at-large by the people of Prescott. Council members are elected to staggered four-year terms, and the mayor to a two-year term. Elections for mayor and council members are held in the first year after the national presidential and mid-term elections to keep national issues from overshadowing local concerns. Mayoral and council elections are non-partisan. There are no term limits for council members or the mayor. The council appoints a professional city manager to oversee the daily administrative operations of city services and their respective departments, including the Prescott Fire Department. The current city manager is Katie Gregory. The current mayor is Cathey Rusing, elected in 2025.

== Education ==
=== Higher education ===
- Yavapai College
- Embry–Riddle Aeronautical University, Prescott
- Prescott College

=== K-12 ===
Prescott Unified School District includes almost all of Prescott, while small pieces of the municipality are in Chino Valley Unified School District.

Schools in Prescott include:

- Prescott High School
- Mile High Middle School (serves seventh and eighth grades)
- Granite Mountain Middle School (serves fifth and sixth grades)
- BASIS Schools
- Northpoint Expeditionary Learning Academy
- Tri-City College Prep High School

There are 18 public schools in Prescott USD, including five charter schools, in grades K-12 and four private schools in Prescott. In 2015, due to budget cuts, the Prescott Unified School District closed Washington Elementary and Miller Valley Elementary schools. To make up for the change all elementary schools only went up to fourth grade. Granite Mountain Middle School serves fifth and sixth grades. Mile High Middle School serves seventh and eighth grades and Prescott High School remains unchanged. A district preschool has been operating in the Washington Elementary since the latter's closure. A recent renovation of the building will be completed in 2018 and will also be the home of the Prescott Unified School District Offices.

== Transportation ==
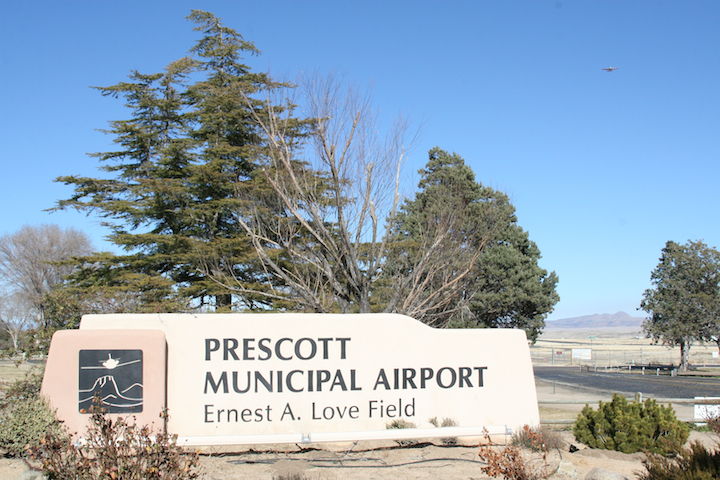
View of airport from Hwy 89

Prescott Regional Airport, Ernest A. Love Field (PRC) is located seven miles (11 km) north of the downtown courthouse. Since 2018, United Express has operated commercial flights from Prescott to Denver and Los Angeles utilizing 50-passenger CRJ-200 regional jets.

The three main thoroughfares in and around Prescott are Arizona State Route 89A, Arizona State Route 69 and Arizona State Route 89. State Route 89A connects Sedona and Cottonwood to Northern Prescott and meets with State Route 89 near the Airport eventually turning into Pioneer Parkway where it connects to Williamson Valley Road. State Route 69 connects Prescott with Prescott Valley to the east, eventually curving southeast before reaching Interstate 17 at mile marker 262, about 65 miles (105 km) from downtown Phoenix. State Route 89 travels mostly north–south and connects Prescott with Chino Valley and Paulden to the north, continuing northward until it joins Interstate 40 at mile marker 146, Ash Fork.

In 2016, ADOT realigned Willow Creek Road between State Route 89 and Pioneer Parkway adding a roundabout on State Route 89 with new access to the Ernest A. Love Field Airport. A future Great western Corridor is planned go on the east side of the Ernest A. Love Field Airport and provide an alternative route to the Airport.

Yavapai Regional Transit provides local bus service connecting Prescott and Chino Valley.

== Nearest cities and towns ==
- Chino Valley
- Groom Creek
- Iron Springs
- Highland Park, Yavapai County, Arizona
- Prescott Valley
- Wildwood Estates
- Yavapai Hills

== Sister cities ==
As of 2015, Prescott has three sister cities:

- Caborca, Sonora, Mexico
- Suchitoto, El Salvador
- Zeitz, Saxony-Anhalt, Germany

== See also ==
- List of historical markers in Prescott, Arizona
