= National Register of Historic Places listings in Prescott, Arizona =

Location of Prescott in Arizona

This is a list of the National Register of Historic Places listings in Prescott, Arizona. It is intended to be a complete list of the properties and districts on the National Register of Historic Places in Prescott, Arizona, United States. The locations of National Register properties and districts for which the latitude and longitude coordinates are included below, may be seen in an online map.

There are 132 properties and districts listed on the National Register in Yavapai County, including 1 that is also a National Historic Landmark. 65 of these properties and districts are located in the city of Prescott, and are listed here, while the remaining 67 properties and districts are located elsewhere in the county, and are listed separately.

This National Park Service list is complete through NPS recent listings posted July 4, 2026.

== Current listings ==
	Name on the Register	Image	Date listed	Location	Description
1	Arizona Pioneers' Home	Arizona Pioneers' Home	November 20, 1995 (#95001363)	300 S. McCormick St. 34°32′15″N 112°28′25″W	Retirement home complex overlooking Prescott
2	Blumberg House	Blumberg House	December 14, 1978 (#78003217)	143 N. Mt. Vernon; 34°32′36″N 112°27′47″W	
3	Brinkmeyer House	Brinkmeyer House	December 14, 1978 (#78003218)	605 W. Gurley; 34°32′31″N 112°28′39″W	
4	Burmister/Timerhoff House	Burmister/Timerhoff House	December 14, 1978 (#78003219)	116 S. Mt. Vernon; 34°32′28″N 112°27′49″W	
5	Clark House	Clark House	December 14, 1978 (#78003220)	109 N. Pleasant; 34°32′32″N 112°27′51″W	
6	Courthouse Plaza Historic District	Courthouse Plaza Historic District	December 14, 1978 (#78003583)	Roughly bounded by Gurley, Montezuma, Cortez, and Goodwin Sts. 34°32′27″N 112°28′10″W	
7	Curtis Cottage	Curtis Cottage	May 4, 1993 (#93000344)	125 S. McCormick; 34°32′33″N 112°28′22″W	
8	Day House	Day House	December 14, 1978 (#78003222)	212 E. Gurley; 34°32′32″N 112°28′00″W	
9	Detwiler House	Detwiler House	December 14, 1978 (#78003223)	310 N. Alarcon; 34°32′45″N 112°27′58″W	
10	Drake House	Drake House	December 14, 1978 (#78003224)	137 N. Mt. Vernon; 34°32′25″N 112°27′46″W	
11	Charles H. Dunning Log Cabin	Charles H. Dunning Log Cabin	August 26, 1993 (#93000870)	811 Boulder Dr. 34°31′40″N 112°28′59″W	
12	East Prescott Historic District	East Prescott Historic District	October 2, 1989 (#89000165)	Roughly bounded by Atchison, Topeka, and Santa Fe railroad tracks, N. Mt. Vernon St., Carleton St., and N. Alarcon St. 34°32′35″N 112°27′49″W	
13	Elks Building and Theater	Elks Building and Theater	December 14, 1978 (#78003226)	117 E. Gurley; 34°32′30″N 112°28′04″W	
14	First Congregational Church and Parsonage	First Congregational Church and Parsonage	December 14, 1978 (#78003227)	216-220 E. Gurley; 34°32′31″N 112°27′59″W	
15	Fisher/Goldwater House	Fisher/Goldwater House	December 14, 1978 (#78003228)	240 S. Cortez; 34°32′18″N 112°28′08″W	
16	Fleury's Addition Historic District	Fleury's Addition Historic District	December 27, 1994 (#94001488)	Roughly Western and Gurley from Willow to Grove, and Willow, Garden, and Grove from Western to Gurley; 34°33′26″N 112°27′55″W	Boundary increase approved July 18, 2019.
17	Fort Whipple-Department of Veterans Affairs Medical Center Historic District	Fort Whipple-Department of Veterans Affairs Medical Center Historic District	October 29, 1999 (#99001274)	500 State Route 89 N. 34°32′58″N 112°27′04″W	Fort Whipple, Arizona
18	Fredericks House	Fredericks House	December 14, 1978 (#78003229)	202 S. Pleasant; 34°32′23″N 112°27′54″W	
19	Gage/Murphy House	Gage/Murphy House	December 14, 1978 (#78003230)	105 S. Alarcon; 34°32′29″N 112°27′57″W	
20	James I. Gardner Store	James I. Gardner Store	January 9, 1985 (#85000056)	201 N. Cortez; 34°32′43″N 112°28′16″W	
21	Henry Goldwater House	Henry Goldwater House	March 25, 1982 (#82002091)	217 E. Union St. 34°32′27″N 112°27′55″W	
22	Hassayampa Historic District	Hassayampa Historic District	May 30, 2003 (#03000469)	1089-1112 Old Hassayampa Ln. and 1106 Country Club Dr. 34°32′08″N 112°29′24″W	
23	Hassayampa Hotel	Hassayampa Hotel	November 29, 1979 (#79000429)	122 E. Gurley St; 34°32′32″N 112°28′01″W	Spanish Colonial Revival design by Henry Trost, architect, 1927
24	Hawkins House	Hawkins House	December 14, 1978 (#78003232)	122 S. Mt. Vernon; 34°32′28″N 112°27′47″W	
25	Hazeltine House	Hazeltine House	December 14, 1978 (#78003233)	202 S. Mt. Vernon; 34°32′23″N 112°27′49″W	
26	Head House	Head House	December 14, 1978 (#78003234)	309 E. Gurley; 34°32′31″N 112°27′55″W	
27	Hill House	Hill House	December 14, 1978 (#78003235)	144 S. Park; 34°32′27″N 112°28′40″W	
28	Sam Hill Hardware	Sam Hill Hardware	December 14, 1978 (#78003252)	154 S. Montezuma; 34°32′25″N 112°28′13″W	Three retail businesses; currently numbered as 156 S. Montezuma
29	Samuel Hill Hardware Company Warehouse	Samuel Hill Hardware Company Warehouse	September 13, 1984 (#84000772)	232 N. McCormick St. 34°32′44″N 112°28′16″W	
30	Hotel Vendome	Hotel Vendome	November 25, 1983 (#83003495)	230 S. Cortez; 34°32′20″N 112°28′06″W	Operating hotel
31	Indian Peak Ruin (AR-03-09-06-116)		January 20, 1989 (#88003185)	Address Restricted	Sinagua ruin
32	Iron Turbine Windmill	Iron Turbine Windmill	July 9, 1981 (#81000139)	415 W. Gurley St. 34°32′30″N 112°28′27″W	Part of Sharlot Hall Museum
33	Joslin and Whipple Historic District	Joslin and Whipple Historic District	December 7, 2000 (#00001387)	S. Mt. Vernon, Virginia, Washington, and Arizona Sts. 34°32′19″N 112°27′42″W	
34	Kenwill Apartments	Kenwill Apartments	January 21, 1988 (#87002494)	119-127 E. Goodwin St. 34°32′23″N 112°28′01″W	
35	Lawler-Hetherington Double House	Lawler-Hetherington Double House	December 14, 1978 (#78003237)	223 E. Union; 34°32′27″N 112°27′58″W	
36	Marks House	Marks House	December 14, 1978 (#78003239)	203 E. Union; 34°32′27″N 112°28′01″W	
37	Martin/Ling House	Martin/Ling House	December 14, 1978 (#78003240)	125 N. Pleasant; 34°32′34″N 112°27′53″W	
38	Mile High Park Historic District	Mile High Park Historic District	September 3, 1999 (#99001069)	Roughly along Oregon Ave. and Josephine St. from Gail Gardner Way and Lindberg Dr. 34°32′49″N 112°29′36″W	
39	Morin House	Morin House	December 14, 1978 (#78003242)	134 N. Mt. Vernon; 34°32′26″N 112°27′47″W	
40	Mormon Church	Mormon Church	December 22, 1983 (#83003496)	126 N. Marina St. 34°32′35″N 112°28′01″W	Converted to commercial use in 1982.
41	Morrison House	Morrison House	December 14, 1978 (#78003243)	300 S. Marina; 34°32′16″N 112°28′03″W	
42	Mountain States Telephone and Telegraph Exchange Building	Mountain States Telephone and Telegraph Exchange Building	September 16, 2004 (#04000512)	116 N. Marina St. 34°32′33″N 112°28′03″W	Now part of the Hassayampa Inn (separately listed)
43	Mulvenon Building	Mulvenon Building	April 15, 1993 (#93000287)	230 W. Gurley St. 34°32′32″N 112°28′17″W	
44	North Prescott Townsite Historic District	North Prescott Townsite Historic District	May 13, 2009 (#08001188)	Between Gurley, Sheldon, Alarcon and Summit Sts. 34°32′38″N 112°28′11″W	
45	Old Governor's Mansion	Old Governor's Mansion	September 10, 1971 (#71000121)	415 W. Gurley; 34°32′29″N 112°28′23″W	Now part of the Sharlot Hall Museum
46	Otis House	Otis House	December 14, 1978 (#78003245)	113 N. Pleasant; 34°32′33″N 112°27′52″W	
47	Peter House	Peter House	December 14, 1978 (#78003247)	211 Union; 34°32′27″N 112°28′00″W	
48	Pine Crest Historic District	Pine Crest Historic District	August 10, 1989 (#89001074)	Roughly bounded by San Carlos St., Coronado Ave., and Yavapai, Apache, and Mohave Drs. 34°32′19″N 112°29′03″W	
49	Prescott Armory Historic District	Prescott Armory Historic District	August 15, 1994 (#94000829)	Roughly bounded by E. Gurley, E. Willis, N. Arizona, E. Sheldon, and N. Rush Sts. 34°33′26″N 112°26′26″W	Includes the Prescott Citizen's Cemetery, Museum of Indigenous People formerly Smoki Pueblo and Museum, National Guard Armory (now Prescott Activity Center), and City Park and Ballfield (now Ken Lindley Field)
50	Prescott Public Library	Prescott Public Library	May 28, 1975 (#75000365)	125 E. Gurley St. 34°32′28″N 112°28′02″W	Old Carnegie library, now an office building
51	Roberts House	Roberts House	December 14, 1978 (#78003249)	136 N. Pleasant; 34°32′35″N 112°27′53″W	
52	A. W. Robinson Building	A. W. Robinson Building	December 14, 1978 (#78003250)	115 N. Grove; 34°32′34″N 112°28′35″W	
53	Sacred Heart Catholic Church and Rectory	Sacred Heart Catholic Church and Rectory	December 14, 1978 (#78003251)	208 N. Marina; 34°32′38″N 112°28′03″W	Now used as the Prescott Fine Arts Association gallery
54	Santa Fe, Prescott and Phoenix Railroad Depot	Santa Fe, Prescott and Phoenix Railroad Depot	February 8, 1988 (#82004978)	Cortez St. 34°32′43″N 112°28′05″W	
55	Sewall House	Sewall House	December 14, 1978 (#78003253)	220 N. Mt. Vernon; 34°32′41″N 112°27′48″W	
56	Shekels House	Shekels House	December 14, 1978 (#78003254)	226 S. Cortez; 34°32′21″N 112°27′49″W	
57	Sloan House	Sloan House	December 14, 1978 (#78003255)	128 N. Mt. Vernon; 34°32′27″N 112°27′49″W	
58	South Prescott Townsite	South Prescott Townsite	August 31, 1998 (#97000859)	Roughly bounded by Alarcon, Montezuma, Union, and Leroux Sts. 34°32′11″N 112°28′04″W	
59	Toltec Lodge	Toltec Lodge	July 20, 2000 (#00000812)	228 High St. 34°32′23″N 112°28′47″W	
60	US Post Office and Courthouse-Prescott Main	US Post Office and Courthouse-Prescott Main	December 3, 1985 (#85003108)	101 W. Goodwin Ave. 34°32′24″N 112°28′09″W	
61	Wells House	Wells House	December 14, 1978 (#78003257)	303 S. Cortez; 34°32′16″N 112°28′07″W	
62	West Prescott Historic District	West Prescott Historic District	August 10, 1989 (#89001075)	Roughly bounded by Gurley Dr., Park Ave., Country Club Dr., Vista Dr., and Coronado Ave.; also 617-621 Glenwood Ave. and 330, 334, 340, 344, and 348 Moreland Circle; 34°32′15″N 112°28′41″W	Second set of addresses represents a boundary increase
63	Whipple Heights Historic District	Whipple Heights Historic District	December 7, 2000 (#00001388)	E. Gurley, N. Virginia, Washington, and E. Moeller Sts. 34°32′36″N 112°27′40″W	
64	Wilder House	Wilder House	December 14, 1978 (#78003259)	346 S. Montezuma; 34°32′11″N 112°28′14″W	
65	Yavapai County Courthouse	Yavapai County Courthouse	April 13, 1977 (#77000241)	Courthouse Plaza; 34°32′27″N 112°28′06″W	1918 Greek Revival style building

== Former listings ==
	Name on the Register	Image	Date listed	Date removed	Location	City or town	Description
1	Curtis Hall		1978 (#78003221)	October 2, 1992	133 S. McCormick; 34°32′27″N 112°28′22″W		
2	Goldwater Mercantile		1978 (#78003584)	October 2, 1992	127 S. Cortez; 34°32′28″N 112°28′07″W		
3	Mulvenon House		1978 (#78003244)	October 2, 1992	233 S. Cortez; 34°32′19″N 112°28′07″W		

== See also ==
- List of National Historic Landmarks in Arizona
- National Register of Historic Places listings in Arizona
