= Brinkmeyer House (Prescott, Arizona) =

- U.S. National Register of Historic Places
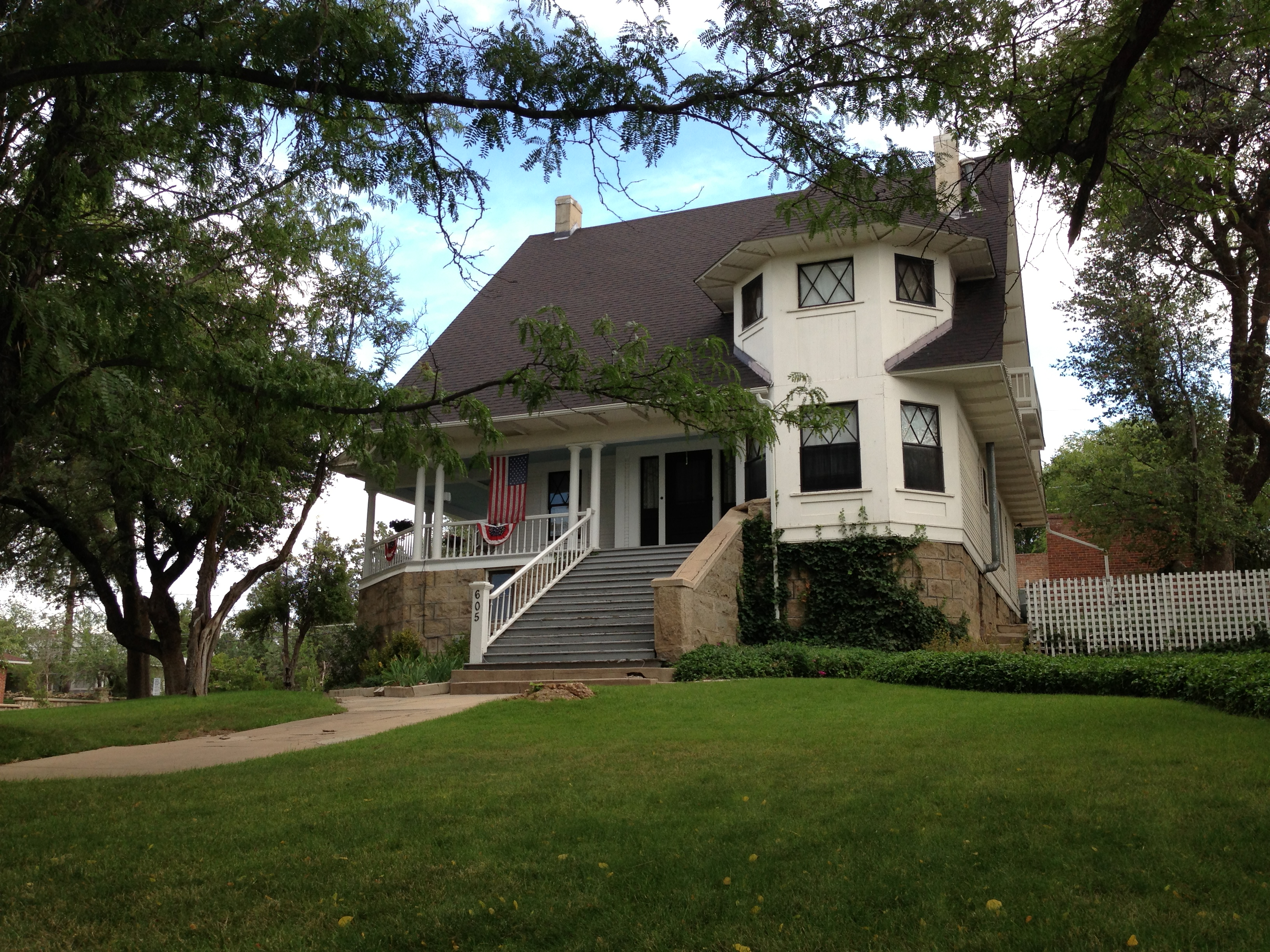

- Location within Arizona Location within the United States
- Location: 605 W. Gurley, Prescott, Arizona
- Coordinates: 34.54194°N 112.47754°W
- Built: 1899
- Architectural style: Shingle style
- MPS: Prescott Territorial Buildings MRA
- NRHP reference No.: 78003218
- Added to NRHP: December 14, 1978

The Brinkmeyer House, at 605 W. Gurley in Prescott, Arizona, was built in 1899. It was listed on the National Register of Historic Places in 1978.

It was built from available house plans in a simplified shingle style.

Its first owner was Henry Brinkmeyer, an immigrant from Germany.

It was open to the public for a "boutique"/bazaar event that was a fundraiser for the Citizens Cemetery (which is another National Register-listed historic site within the Prescott Armory Historic District) in 2007.
