= Sloan House (Prescott, Arizona) =

Historical building

- U.S. National Register of Historic Places
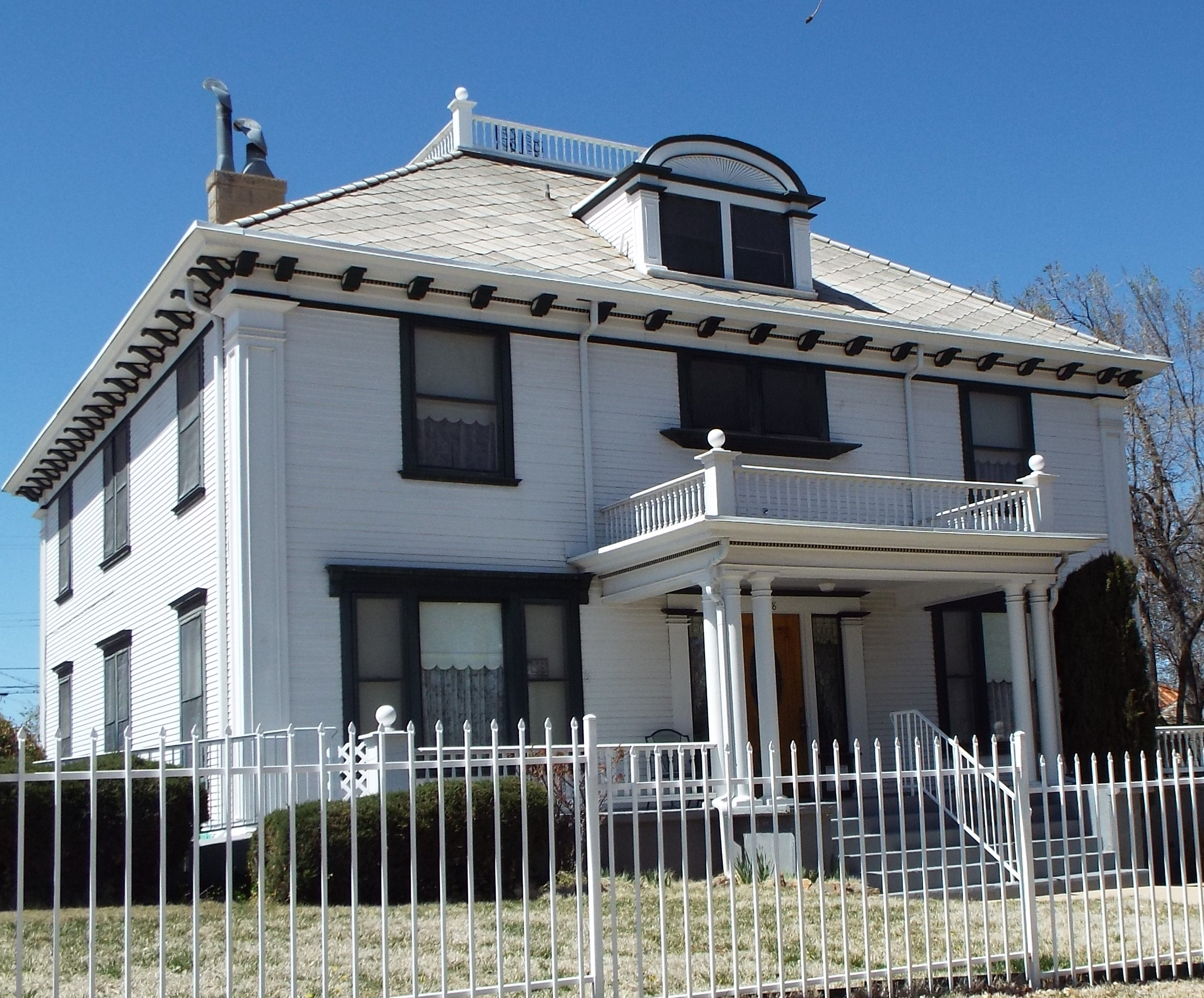
- Sloan House

- Location within Arizona Location within the United States
- Location: 128 North Mount Vernon St., Prescott, Arizona
- Built: 1900
- MPS: Prescott Territorial Buildings MRA
- NRHP reference No.: 78003255
- Added to NRHP: December 14, 1978

The Sloan House was built in 1900 and located at 128 N. Mt. Vernon St. It was listed in the National Register of Historic Places on December 14, 1978, reference #78003255. This house belonged to Richard Elihu Sloan, prominent attorney who was appointed by President William Howard Taft territorial governor of Arizona. He was therefore, the 17th and last territorial governor of Arizona.

== History ==
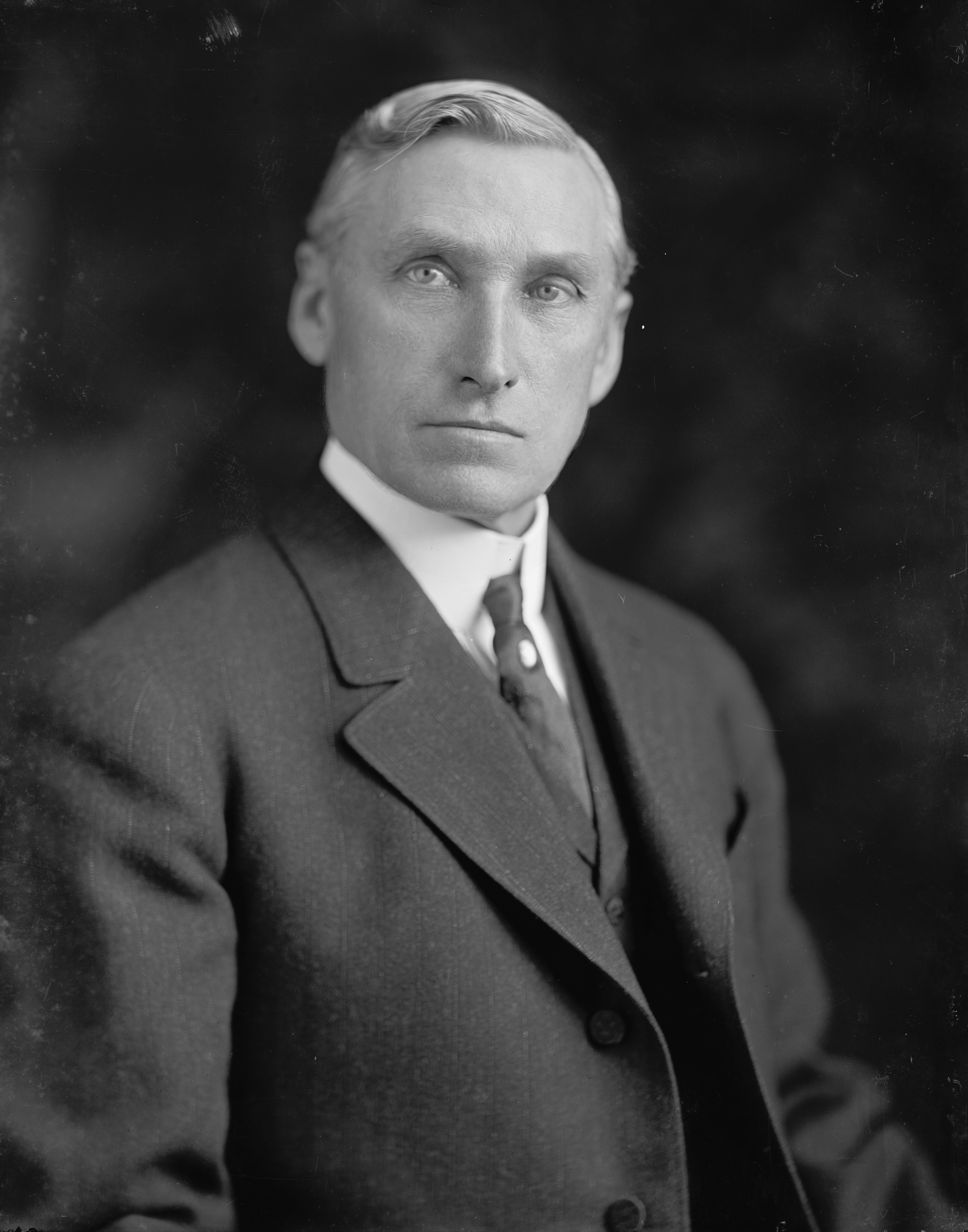
Governor Richard Elihu Sloan

Sloan was born on June 22, 1857, in Morning Sun, Preble County, Ohio, to Mary (Caldwell) and Dr. Richard E. Sloan. Sloan and Louis H. Chalmers, a friend, arrived in Phoenix, Arizona Territory in late 1884. He was admitted to the territorial bar in January 1885 and opened a private legal practice with Chalmers as his partner.

In October 1889, President Benjamin Harrison appointed Sloan to the position of United States Attorney General to Arizona Territory's 1st district. The appointment was confirmed by the United States Senate on February 19, 1890. He remained in the mentioned position until February 19, 1894. Sloan moved to Prescott, Arizona Territory and returned to private practice. On June 26, 1897, recently inaugurated President William McKinley nominated him for the seat in Arizona's 4th judicial district. Sloan was confirmed by the United States Senate on July 8, 1897. His four-year term was twice renewed by President Theodore Roosevelt, on December 12, 1901, and February 26, 1906.

After the inauguration of President William Howard Taft, Sloan was summoned to the White House. The president named Sloan governor of the Territory of Arizona. He took a short time to set his judicial affairs in order and was sworn in as governor in Phoenix on May 1, 1909. Territorial Delegate Ralph H. Cameron introduced a statehood bill into the United States House of Representatives in January 1910 and Sloan spent the spring of that year in Washington, D.C. working toward passage of the bill.

== The Sloan House ==
According to the National Register of Historic Places, the architectural style of the house is Classical Revival. The historic function of the house is that of a single dwelling domestic home. It is also stated that the significant years were 1900–01 when Sloan resided there.

== See also ==
- National Register of Historic Places listings in Prescott, Arizona
- List of historic properties in Prescott, Arizona

== Sources ==
- "Sloan, Richard Elihu – Federal Judicial Center". www.fjc.gov.
- Goff, John S. (July 1968). "The Appointment, Tenure and Removal of Territorial Judges: Arizona – A Case Study". The American Journal of Legal History. 12 (3). Temple University: 211–231. doi:10.2307/844126. JSTOR 844126.
- —— (1975). Arizona Territorial Officials Volume I: The Supreme Court Justices 1863–1912. Cave Creek, Arizona: Black Mountain Press. OCLC 1622668.
- —— (1978). Arizona Territorial Officials Volume II: The Governors 1863–1912. Cave Creek, Arizona: Black Mountain Press. OCLC 5100411.
- Wagoner, Jay J. (1970). Arizona Territory 1863–1912: A Political history. Tucson: University of Arizona Press. ISBN 0-8165-0176-9.
