= Toltec Lodge =

- U.S. National Register of Historic Places
- Location: 228 High St., Prescott, Arizona
- Coordinates: 34°32′23″N 112°28′47″W
- Area: 6.5 acres (2.6 ha)
- Built: 1919
- Built by: Le Roy and Margherite Anderson
- Architectural style: Bungalow/American craftsman, Prairie School
- NRHP reference No.: 00000812
- Added to NRHP: July 20, 2000

The Toltec Lodge, at 228 High St. in Prescott, Arizona, was built in 1919. It was listed on the National Register of Historic Places in 2000.

It is a one-story Craftsman / Prairie School style house built for Le Roy and Margherite Anderson.
