= Detwiler House =

- U.S. National Register of Historic Places
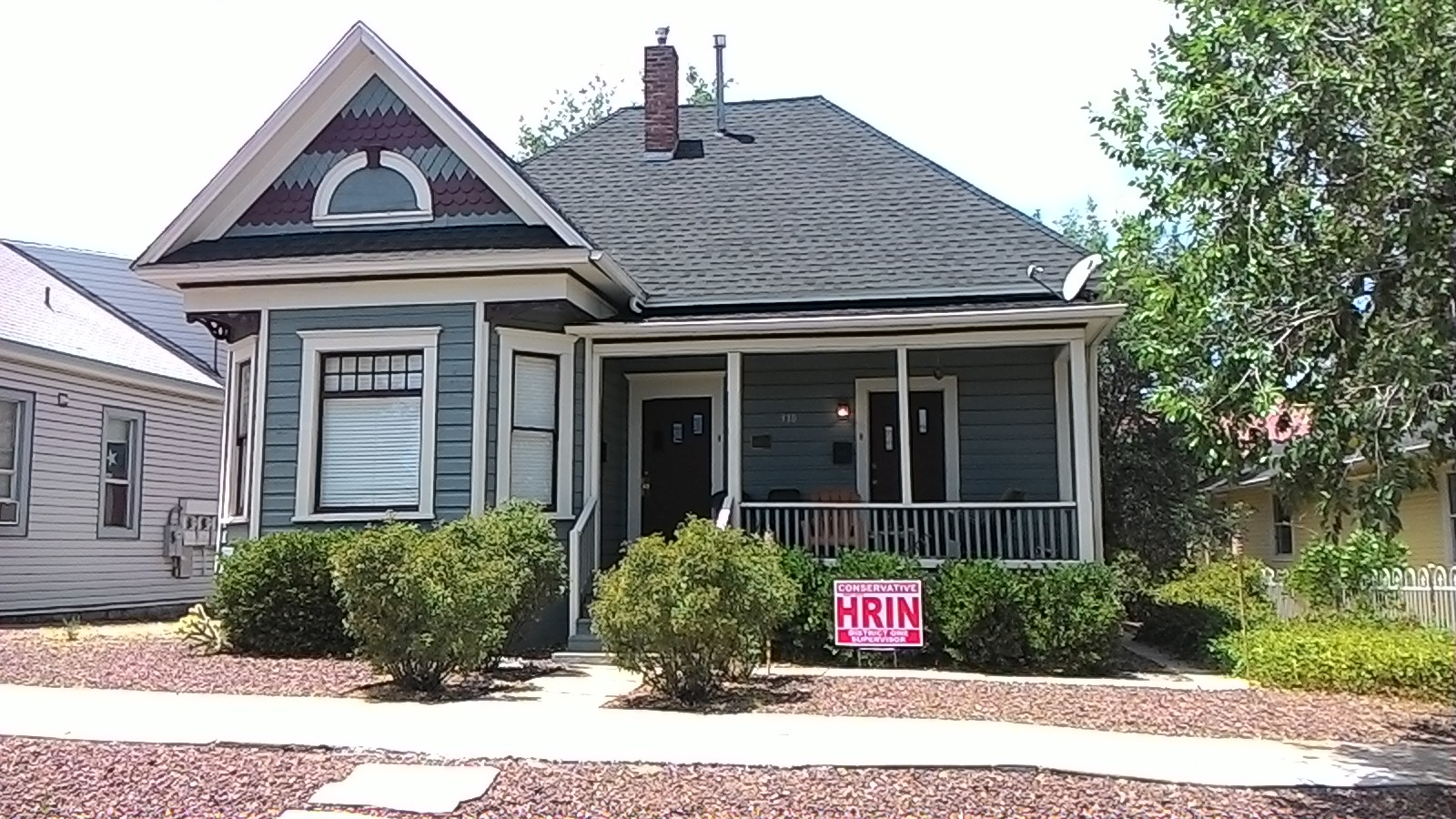

- Location within Arizona
- Location: 310 N. Alarcon, Prescott, Arizona
- Built: 1900
- MPS: Prescott Territorial Buildings MRA
- NRHP reference No.: 78003223
- Added to NRHP: December 14, 1978

The Detwiler House, at 310 N. Alarcon in Prescott, Arizona, was built around 1900. It was listed on the National Register of Historic Places in 1978.

== History ==
It is significant as the home of J.S. "Whistling Jack" Detwiler and his family. Detwiler was a well-known railroad engineer on the Santa Fe, Prescott and Phoenix Railway. It was later home of the parents of Ernest Love (1895–1918), a local World War I hero, namesake of Ernest A. Love Field.

It is a wood-frame structure about 30 by 45 feet (9.1 m × 13.7 m) in plan.
