= Sacred Heart Catholic Church and Rectory (Prescott, Arizona) =

Historic church in Arizona, United States

Coordinates: 34.5440°N 112.4674°W

- U.S. National Register of Historic Places
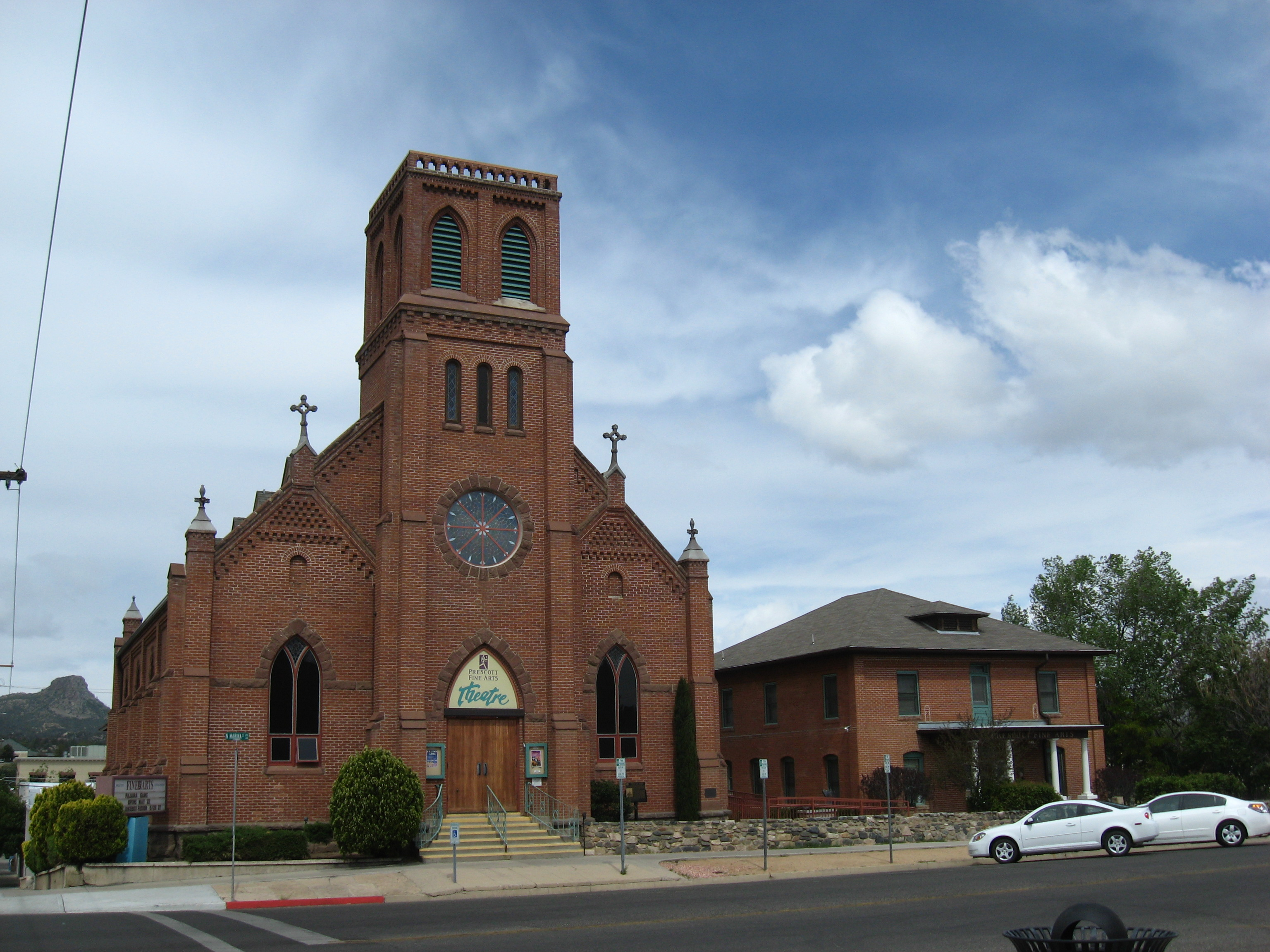
- Church and rectory in 2008

- Location within Arizona Location within the United States
- Location: 208 N. Marina, Prescott, Arizona
- Built: 1894
- Architect: Parker, Frank
- Architectural style: Late Gothic Revival
- MPS: Prescott Territorial Buildings MRA
- NRHP reference No.: 78003251
- Added to NRHP: December 14, 1978

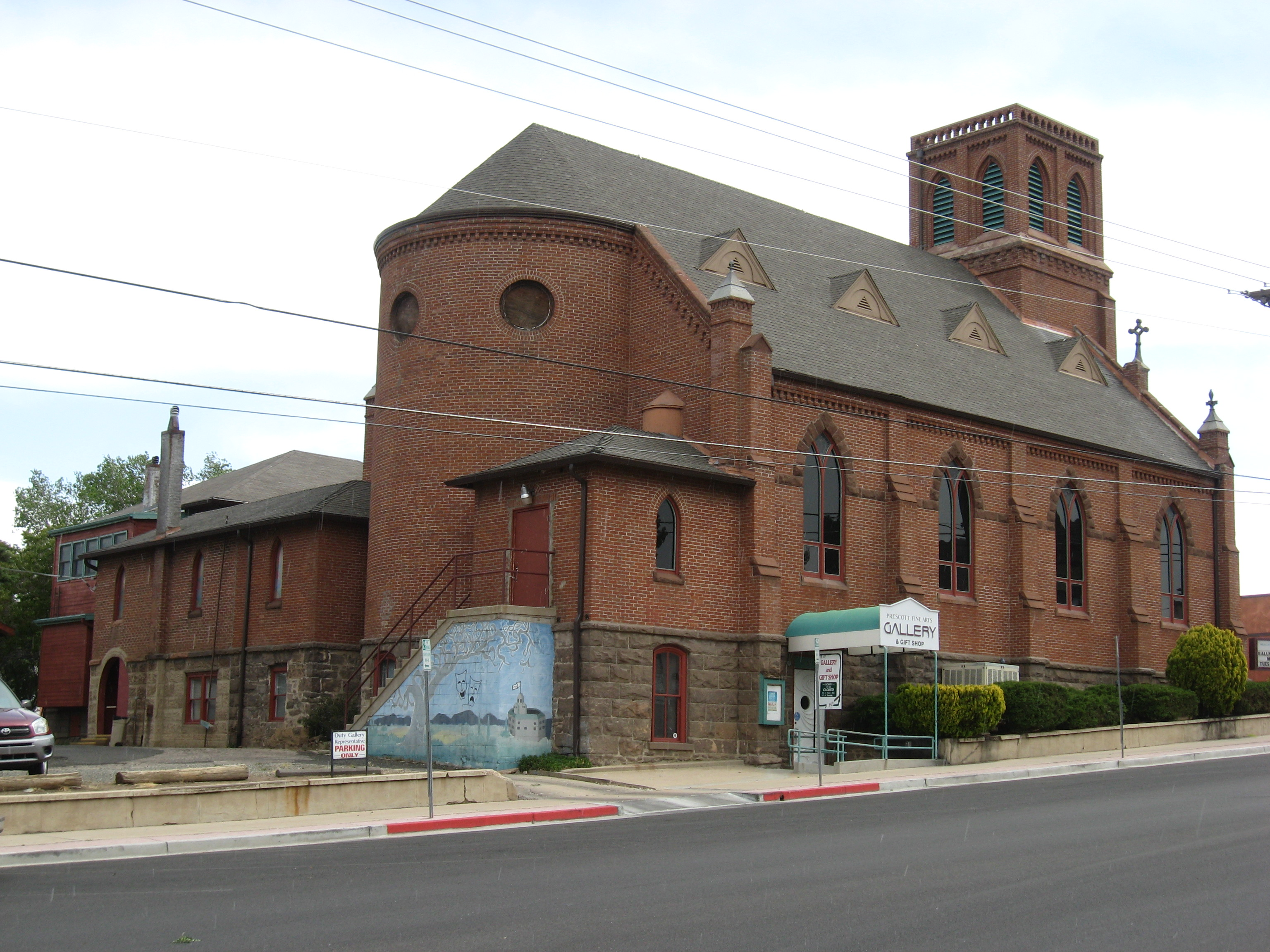

The Sacred Heart Catholic Church and Rectory in Prescott, Arizona, United States is a complex of buildings that is listed on the National Register of Historic Places. In 2016, it serves as the Prescott Center for the Arts, formerly the Prescott Fine Arts Association. It is the former home of the Sacred Heart Catholic Church, founded in 1871 now located at 150 Fleury Avenue in Prescott.

The church is asserted to be "one of the best examples of nineteenth century religious architecture in Arizona". It was designed by architect Frank Parker and was built in 1915. It had a steeple until it was destroyed in a storm in 1930. The buildings served the parish until 1969.
