= Courthouse Plaza Historic District =

Historic district in Arizona, United States

Coordinates: 34.54090°N 112.4694°W

- U.S. National Register of Historic Places
- U.S. Historic district
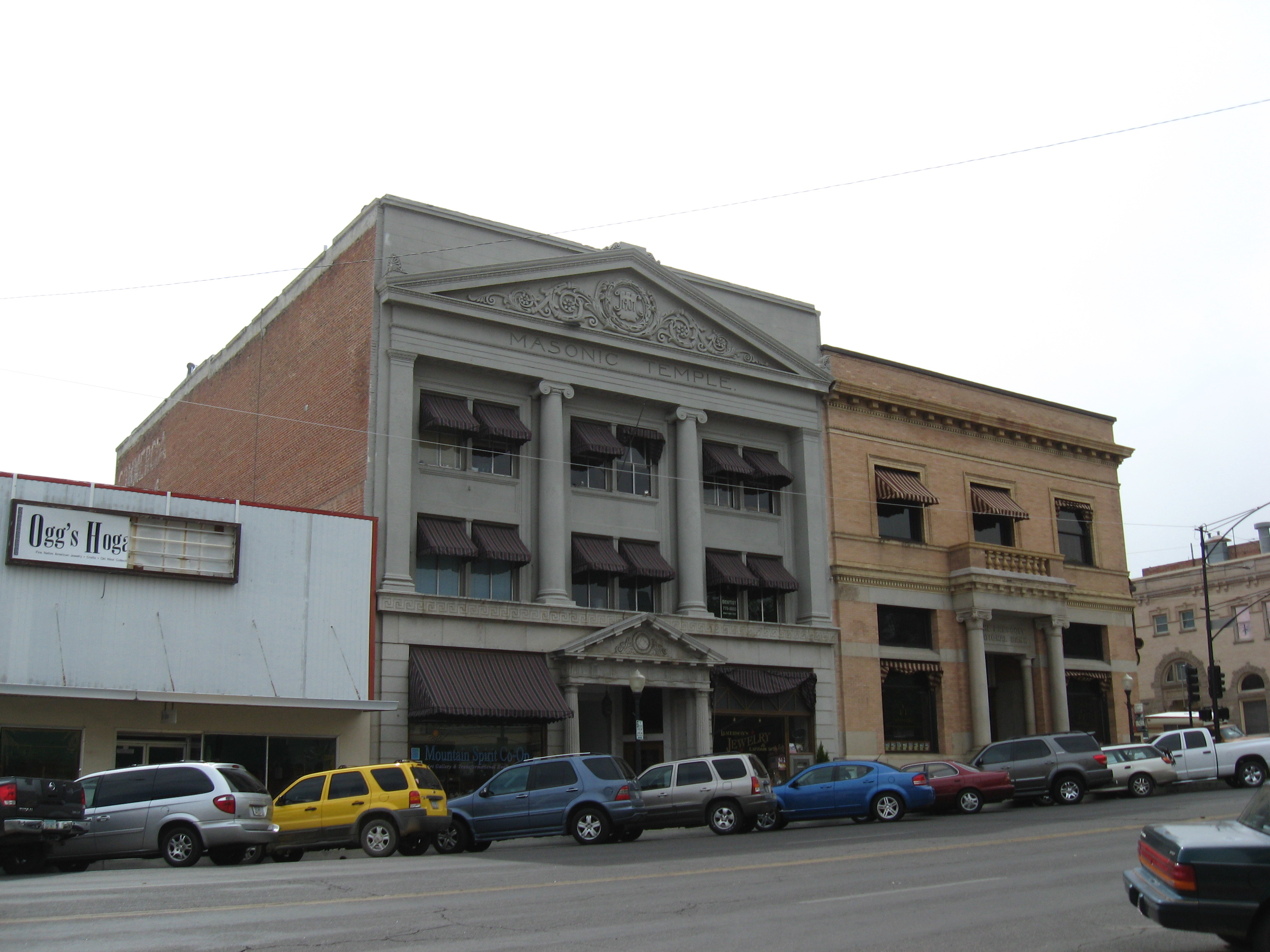
- Masonic Temple and former Prescott National Bank, in 2008

- Location within Arizona Location within the United States
- Location: Roughly bounded by Gurley, Montezuma, Cortez and Goodwin Sts., Prescott, Arizona
- Area: 17 acres (6.9 ha)
- Architectural style: Late Victorian
- MPS: Prescott Territorial Buildings MRA
- NRHP reference No.: 78003583
- Added to NRHP: December 14, 1978

The Courthouse Plaza Historic District is a historic district in Prescott, Arizona that was listed on the U.S. National Register of Historic Places (NRHP) in 1978.

It includes 26 contributing buildings including the Yavapai County Courthouse (already separately listed on the NRHP) and the Masonic Temple, in a 17-acre (6.9 ha) area.

The most significant buildings are:

- Bank of Arizona Building
- Knights of Pythias Building
- Prescott National Bank Building
- Levy Building
- Palace Hotel
- St. Michael Hotel
- Masonic Temple (1907), three-story 50 by 95 feet (15 m × 29 m) building with colossal columns, pilasters, and pediment
- Goldwater Mercantile
- Electric Building

== Gallery ==
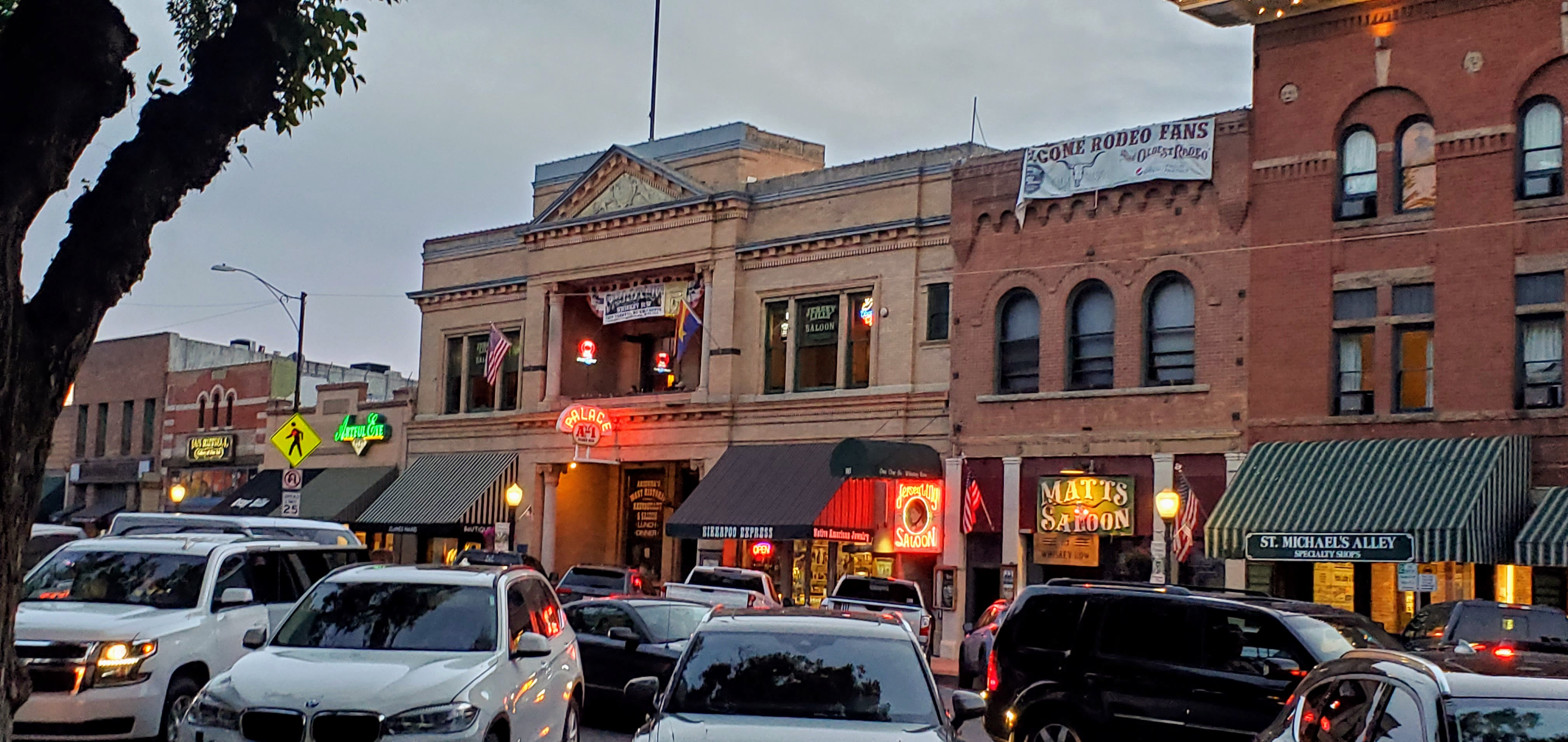
The Palace and Matt's Saloon, 2020

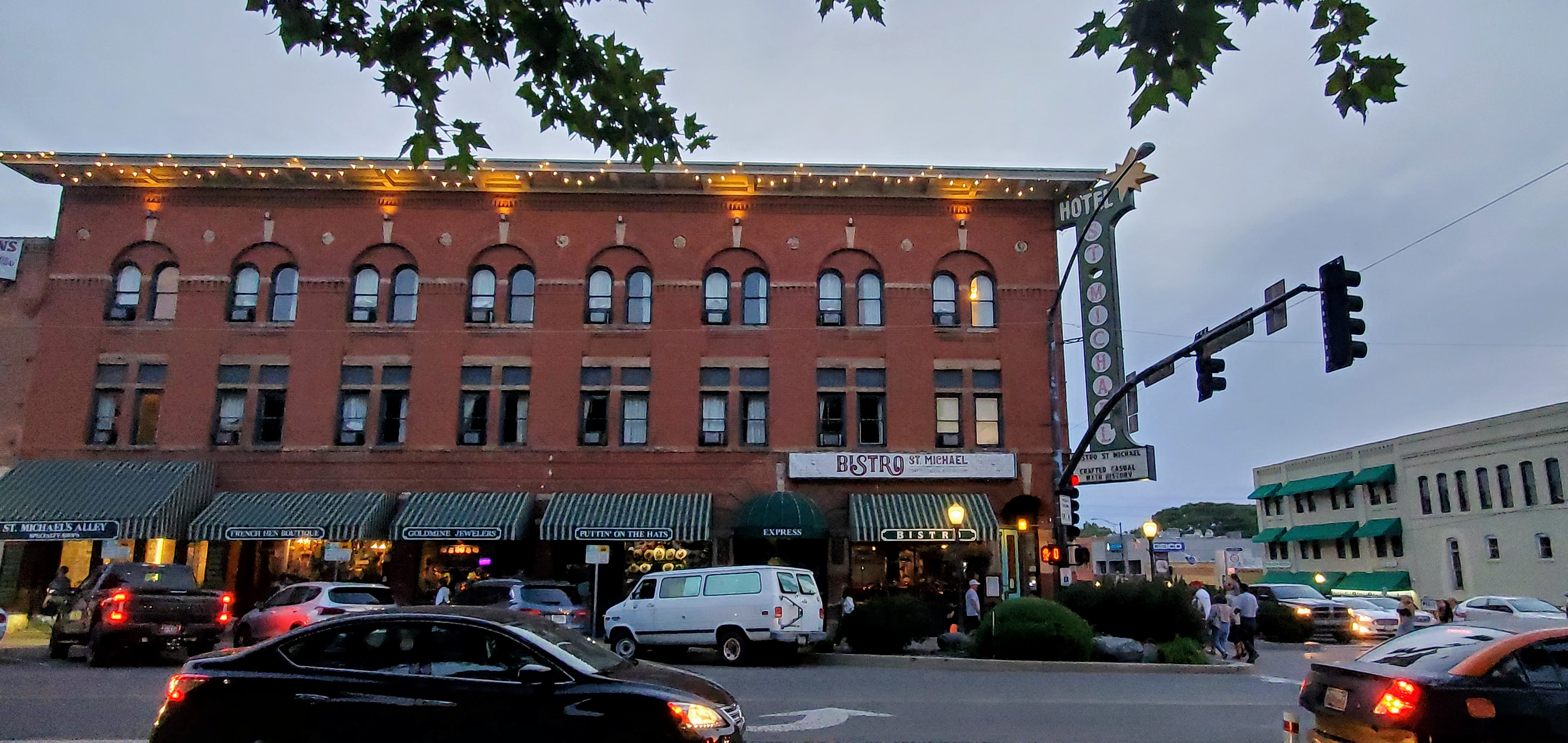
Hotel St. Michael, 2020

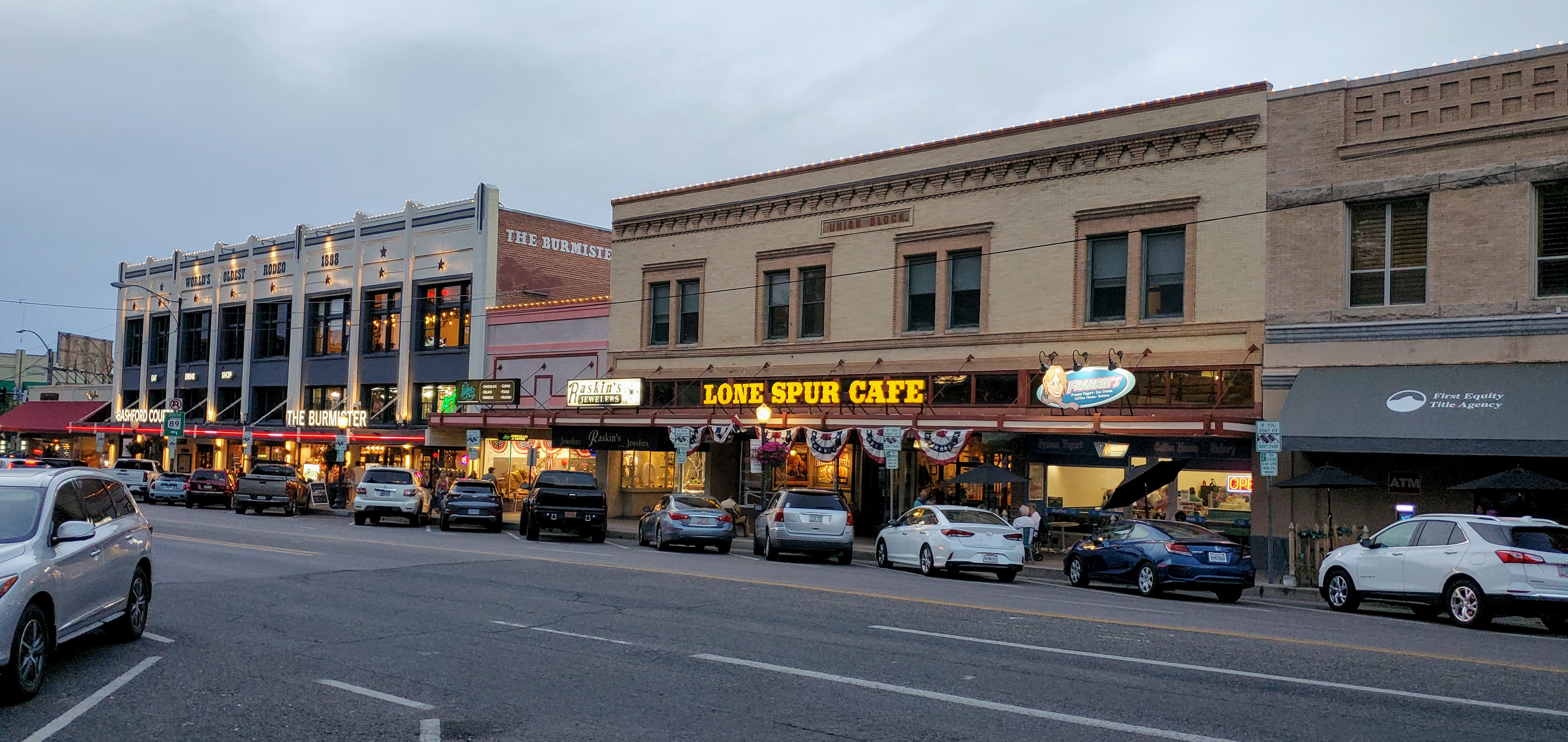
E.A. Kastner Building, Bashford-Burmister Building and Union Block, 2020

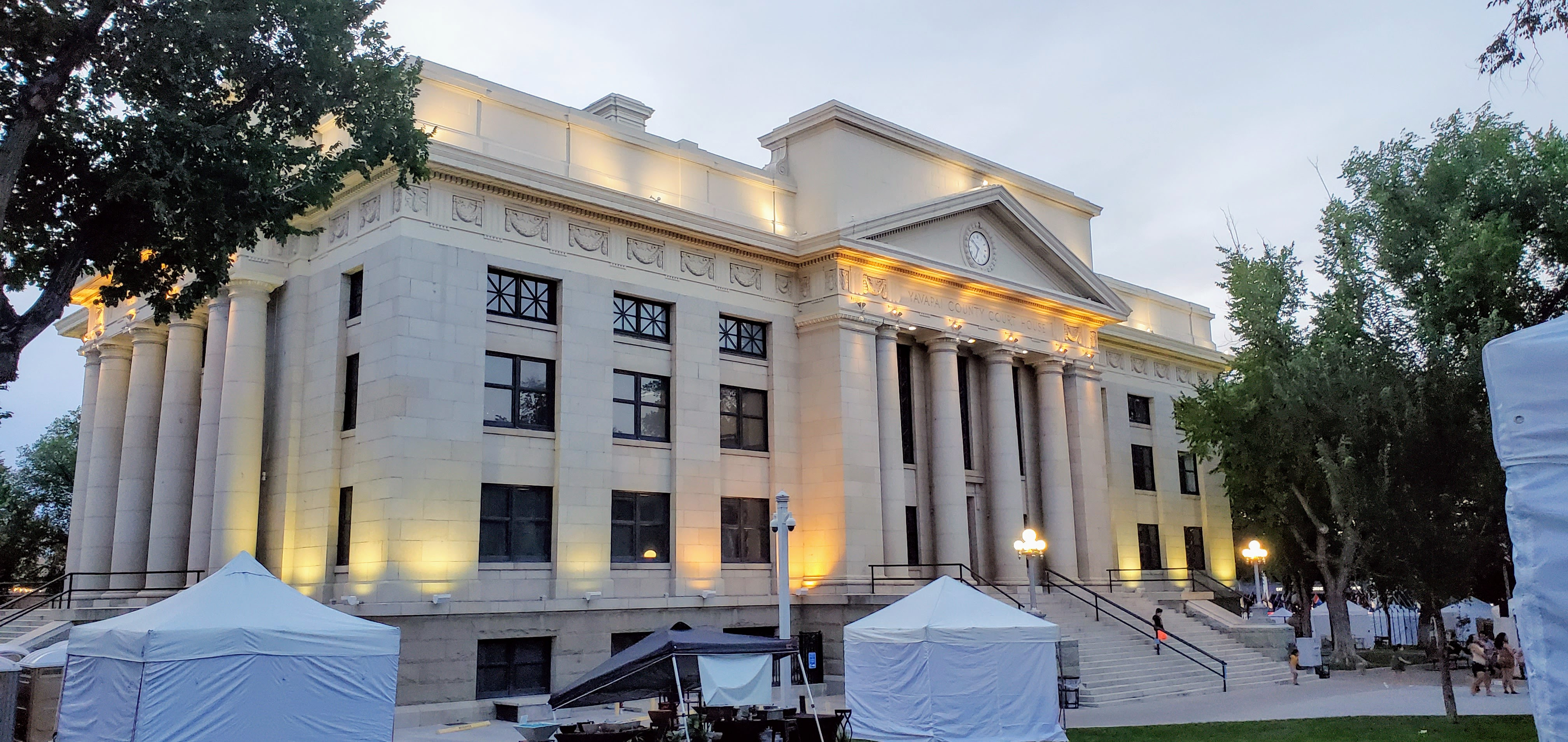
Yavapai County Courthouse, 2020

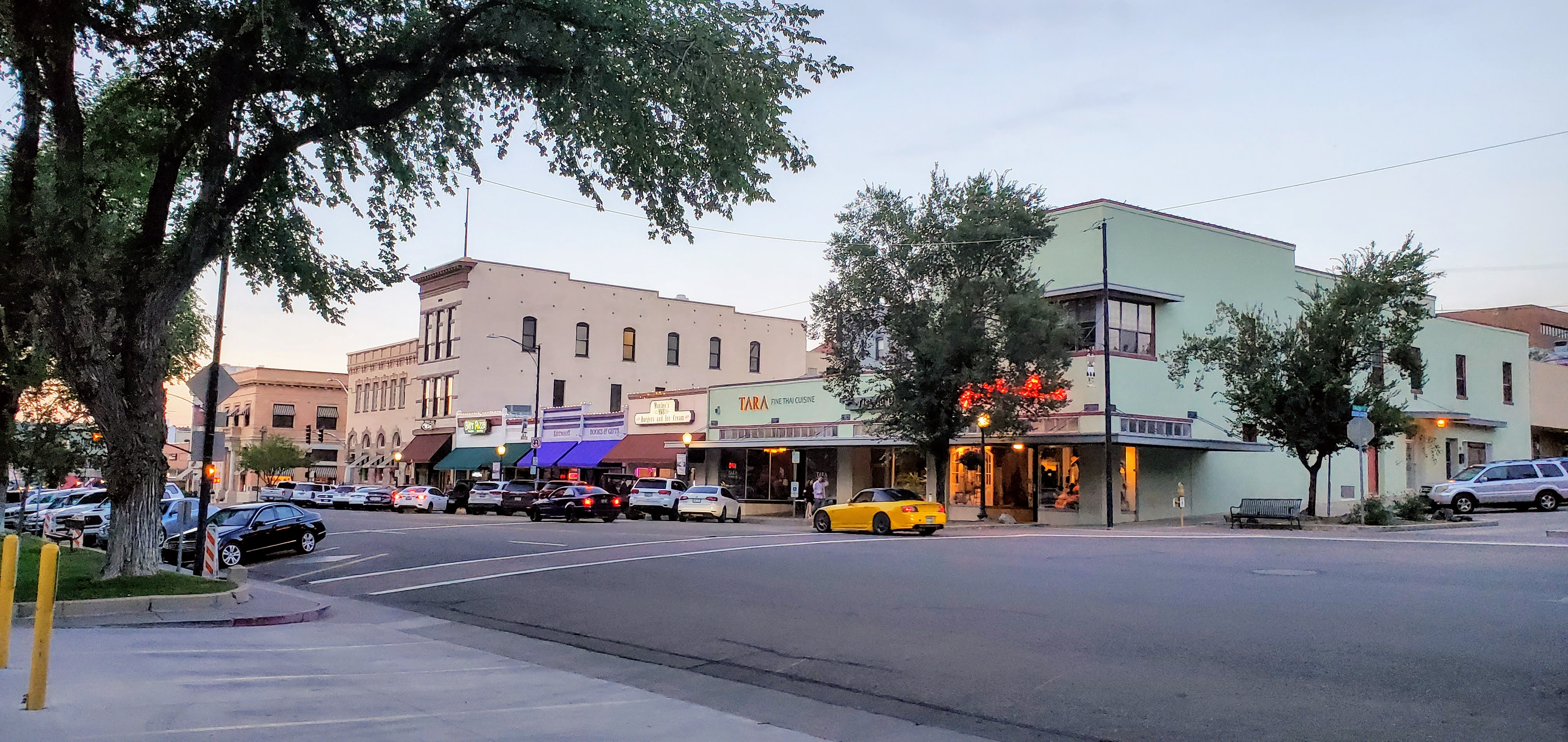
101-123 S. Cortez Street, 2020

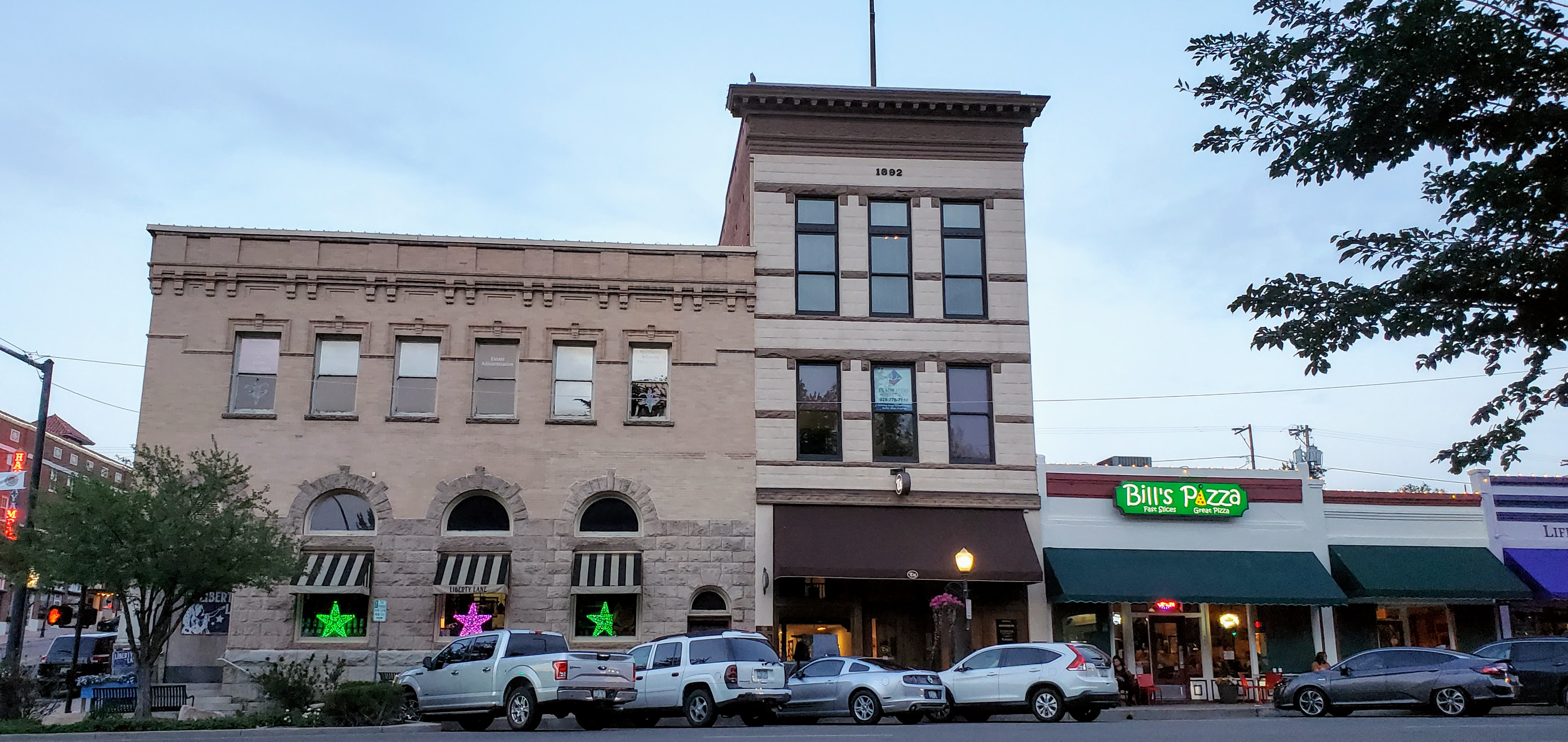
101-107 S. Cortez Street

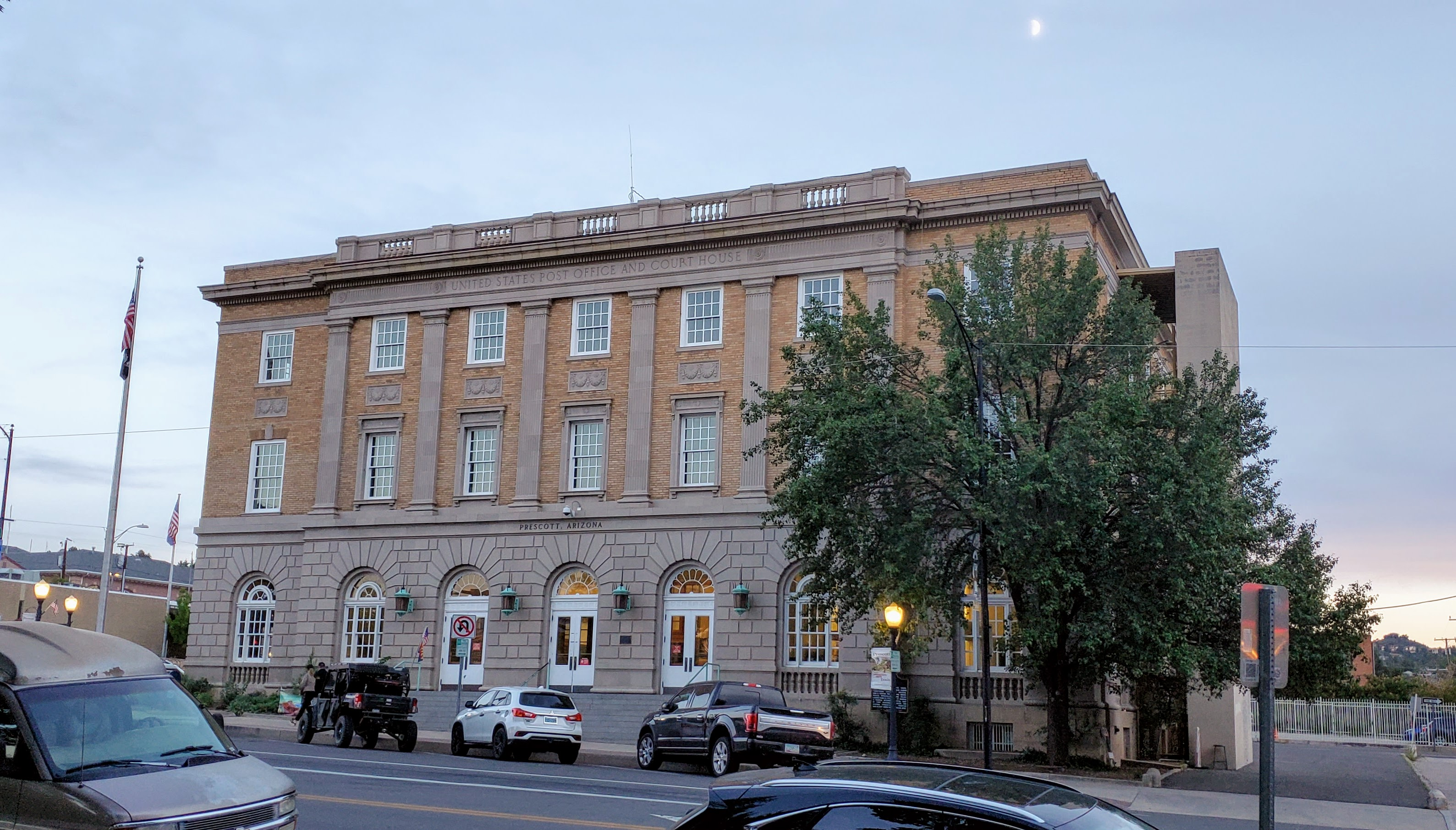
U.S. Post Office and Courthouse, 2020
