= Hassayampa Inn =

United States historic place in Prescott, Arizona

- Hassayampa Hotel
- U.S. National Register of Historic Places
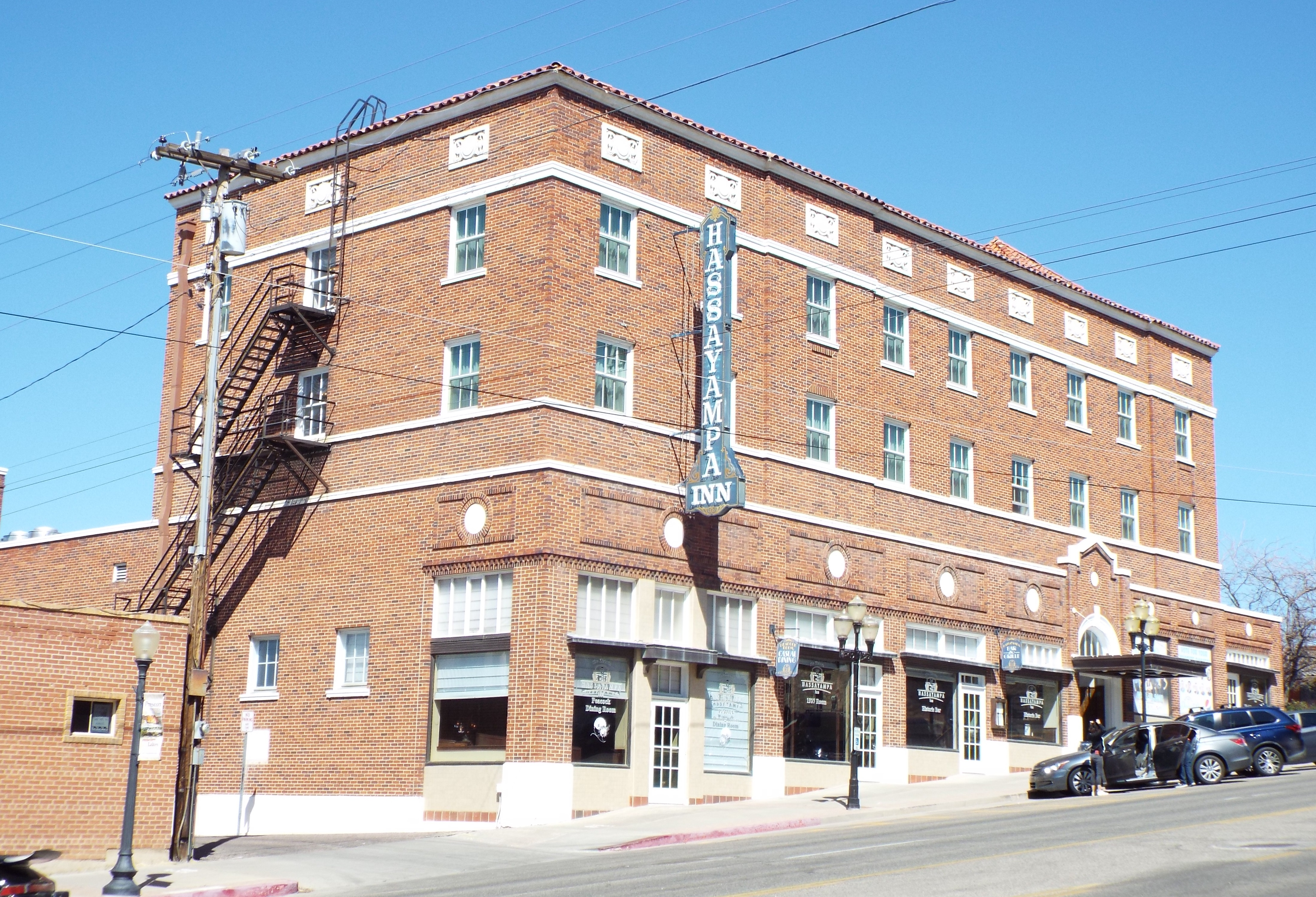

- Location within Arizona
- Location: 122 E. Gurley St, Prescott, Arizona
- Coordinates: 34°32′32″N 112°28′01″W
- Area: 1 acre (0.40 ha)
- Built: 1927
- Built by: Ramey Bros.
- Architect: Trost & Trost
- Architectural style: Mission/spanish Revival, Italian Renaissance Revival
- NRHP reference No.: 79000429
- Added to NRHP: November 29, 1979

The Hassayampa Inn, long known as the Hassayampa Hotel, in Prescott, Arizona, is a landmark on Gurley Street which was built in 1927. It was designed by architects Trost & Trost.

Its architecture is Mission/Spanish Revival and/or Italian Renaissance Revival.

It is listed on the National Register of Historic Places in 1979.

It is a member of the National Registry of the Historic Hotels of America.

It was built by the Ramey Bros., construction contractors of El Paso, Texas.
