= Prescott Armory Historic District =

- U.S. National Register of Historic Places
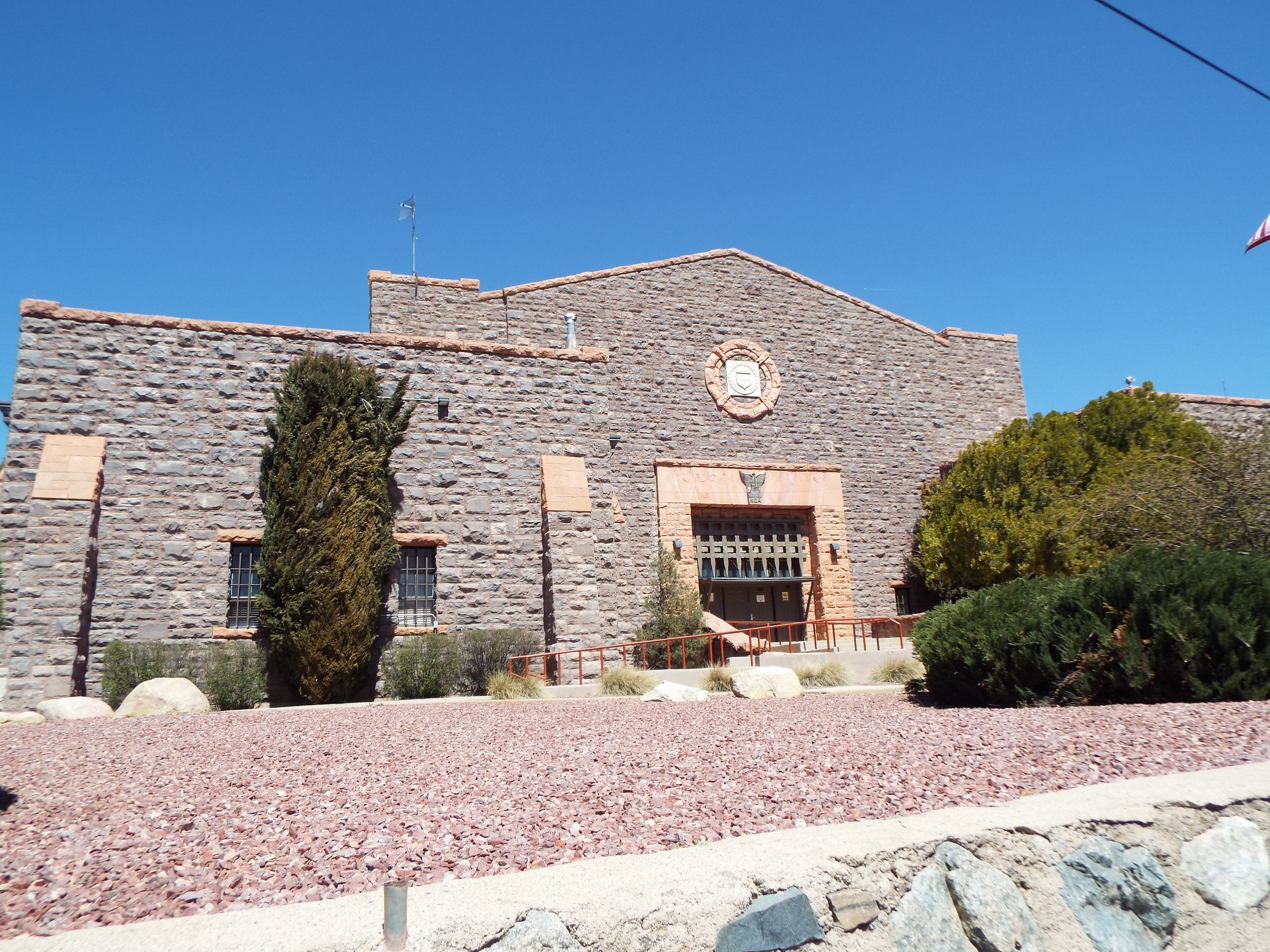
- Prescott National Guard Armory

- Location within Arizona
- Location: Roughly bounded by E. Gurley, E. Willis, N. Arizona, E. Sheldon and N. Rush Sts., Prescott, Arizona
- Coordinates: 34.557222°N 112.440556°W
- Area: 12 acres (4.9 ha)
- Built: 1931
- Built by: Charles Totten; et al.
- NRHP reference No.: 94000829
- Added to NRHP: August 15, 1994

The Prescott Armory Historic District is a 12 acres (4.9 ha) historic district which was listed on the National Register of Historic Places in 1994. It is a group of properties which "are all associated with Depression Era construction between 1929 and 1939."

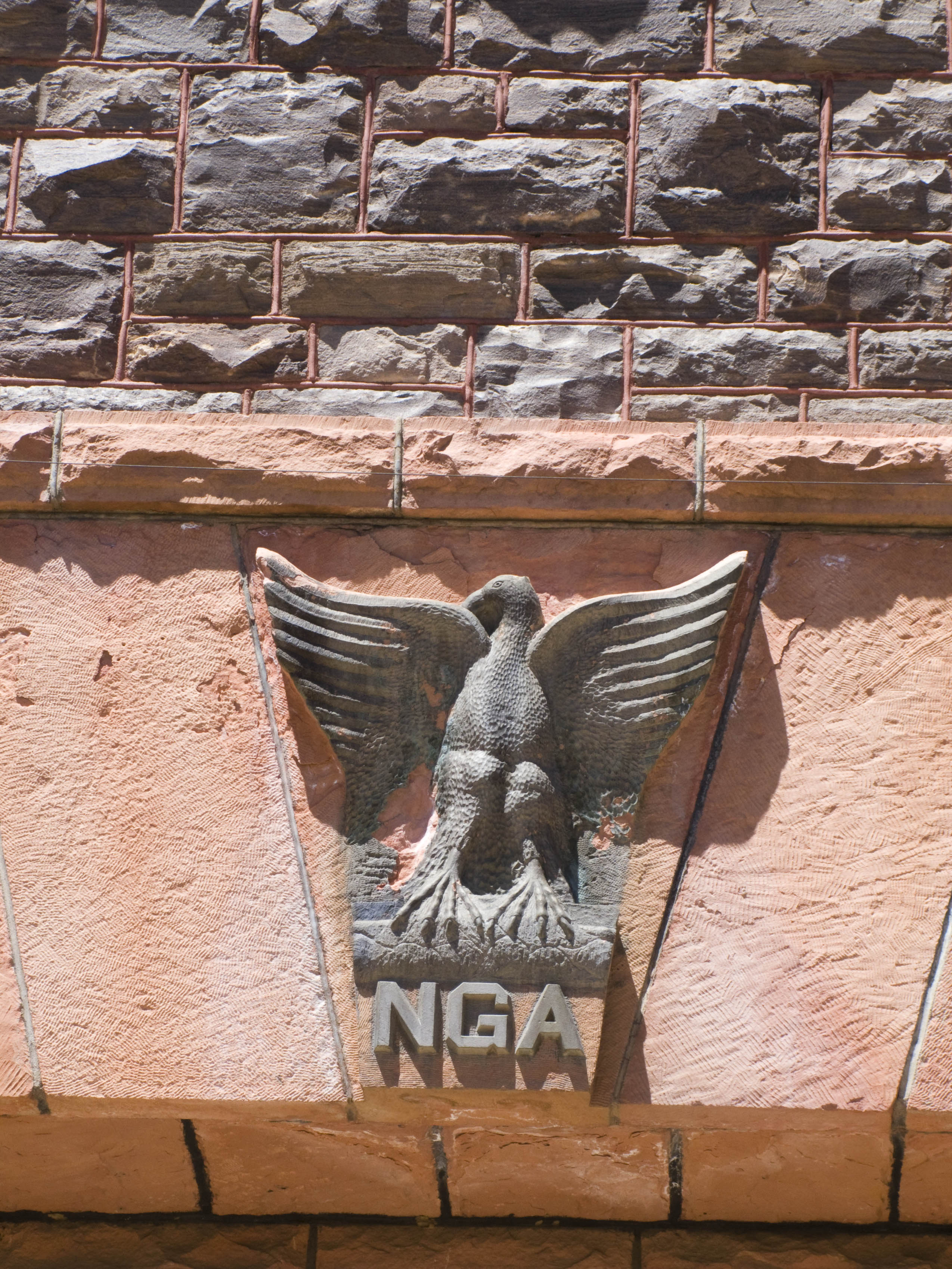
Detail upon National Guard Armory

The district includes the Prescott Citizen's Cemetery, the Smoki Pueblo and Museum, Prescott's National Guard Armory (now Prescott Activity Center), and the City Park and Ballfield (now Ken Lindley Field). All four of the buildings and two structures in the district are vernacular architecture (i.e. without high style). The armory, however, includes some elements of Richardsonian Romanesque architecture in its detailing, and the grandstand includes minor elements of Art Deco design.

The district is roughly bounded by E. Gurley, E. Willis, N. Arizona, E. Sheldon and N. Rush Streets.

It was deemed significant for "its association with the Depression-era in Prescott and the impact of various public relief efforts, both public and private. It is also significant ... because it presents a cohesive group of projects which represent a style and technique common during the Depression-era. The period of significance dates from 1930, when the first local efforts began in response to the Great Depression (1929-1942) and 1939, corresponding to the completion of the last building within the District, the Prescott National Guard Armory."

== Citizens Cemetery ==
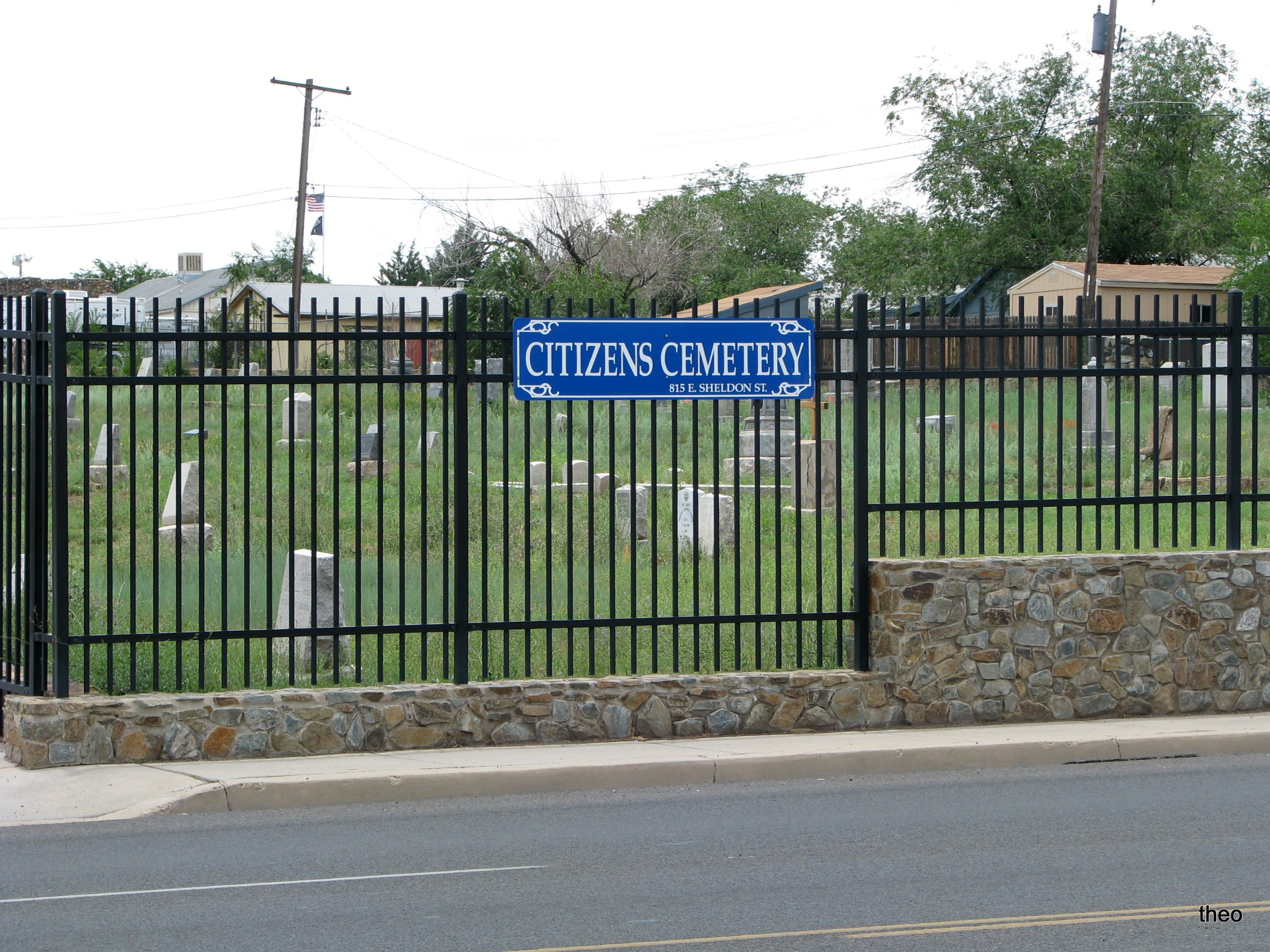
Cemetery

Prescott's Citizens Cemetery "is a very large, historic final “resting place” for at least 3,500 of the area's pioneers, miners, and merchants of all kinds, Citizens and non-Citizens, wealthy, indigent, famous and infamous, and unknown deceased." It began with a burial of Joel Woods, a Colorado legislator, on public land southwest of Fort Whipple. It was termed "Citizens Cemetery" by 1872, and was deeded to a Virginia Koch in 1876, and eventually came to be owned by Yavapai County. Eligibility for burials was limited in 1933, and it has since been closed for burials. Only about 600 gravesites are marked. The 6.5 acres (26,000 m^{2}) area of the cemetery was enclosed by a stone and masonry wall constructed in a Civil Works Administration project in 1934.

It has been maintained by the county and by volunteers of the Yavapai Cemetery Association.
