= Arizona State Route 89A =

State highway in Arizona, United States

State Route 89A
- SR 89A highlighted in red

Route information
- Maintained by ADOT, City of Sedona
- Length: 83.85 mi (134.94 km)
- Existed: 1993–present
- History: Originally designated as SR 79 in 1927; redesignated as US 89A by 1941
- Tourist routes: Mingus Mountain Scenic Road; Jerome-Clarkdale-Cottonwood Historic Road; Sedona-Oak Creek Canyon Scenic Road

Major junctions
- South end: SR 89 in Prescott
- SR 260 in Cottonwood; SR 179 in Sedona; I-17 in Flagstaff; I-40 in Flagstaff
- North end: BL 40 in Flagstaff

Location
- Country: United States
- State: Arizona
- Counties: Yavapai, Coconino

Highway system
- Arizona State Highway System; Interstate; US; State; Scenic Proposed; Former
| ← US 89A | SR 89A | → SR 90 |
| ← SR 78 | SR 79 (1927–1940) | → SR 79 |

State Route 89A (SR 89A) is an 83.85-mile (134.94 km) state highway that runs from Prescott north to Flagstaff in the U.S. state of Arizona. The highway begins at SR 89 in Yavapai County and heads northward from Prescott Valley, entering Jerome. From Jerome, the route then heads to Cottonwood and Clarkdale. The road then continues out to Sedona. The highway is notable for its scenic value as it winds over and through Mingus Mountain as well as passing through Sedona and the Oak Creek Canyon. The route then enters Coconino County soon after leaving Sedona. The highway proceeds to Flagstaff, where it crosses Interstate 17 (I-17) and I-40. The highway ends at I-40 Business in Flagstaff. What is now SR 89A became a state highway in the late 1920s as SR 79. The highway was extended and improved several times through 1938. SR 79 was renumbered to U.S. Route 89A (US 89A) in 1941 and then to SR 89A in the early 1990s.

== Route description ==
SR 89A runs from its southern terminus in Prescott northward through the towns of Jerome, Cottonwood and Sedona to its northern terminus in Flagstaff. The highway is known for its scenic views as it passes through the Sedona area and Oak Creek Canyon.

=== Prescott to Jerome ===
SR 89A's southern terminus is at a junction with SR 89 north of Prescott near the Antelope Hills Golf Course and Ernest A. Love Field. The road heads east from the junction with SR 89 as the Pioneer Parkway, a four-lane divided highway with diamond interchanges at most intersections. It continues as a divided highway until it reaches Fain Road in Prescott Valley. The route continues beyond this intersection as a two-lane undivided highway. The only at-grade intersection in this stretch is a junction with Great Western Drive, near milepost 321.

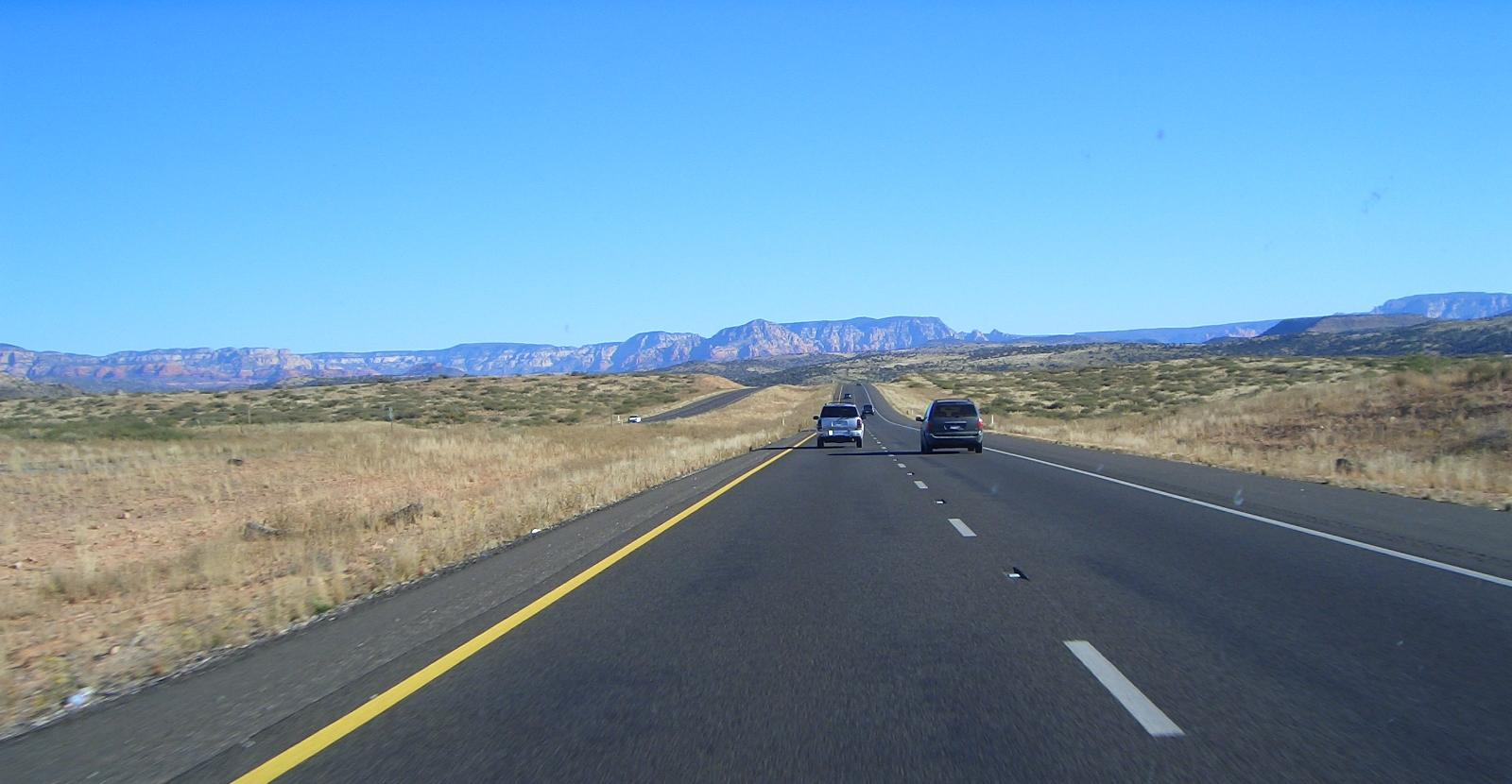
SR 89A north of Cottonwood

As SR 89A moves to the northeast, it begins to ascend the Black Hills mountain range. ADOT has designated this section of SR 89A as the Mingus Mountain Scenic Road by ADOT. The roadway follows the terrain through a series of hairpin turns as it climbs in elevation. Once SR 89A reaches passes over the mountains, it begins its descent into the Verde Valley. During its descent, SR 89A enters the town of Jerome. In Jerome, the highway provides access to the nearby Jerome State Historic Park.

=== Jerome to Sedona ===
Upon exiting Jerome, SR 89A heads northeast through the Verde Valley. The highway also picks up the Historic US 89A designation on the south end of Jerome. Officially named the Jerome-Clarkdale-Cottonwood Historic Road by the Arizona Department of Transportation, Historic US 89A is one of only four state designated historic routes in Arizona, the others being Historic Route 66, Historic U.S. Route 80 and the Apache Trail Historic Road. The historic route was designated on May 13, 1992, by ADOT and is about 10 miles long.

After SR 89A and Historic US 89A enter the town of Clarkdale, SR 89A turns southeast at a roundabout with Clarkdale Parkway. The route continues toward the southeast through Clarkdale before entering the town of Cottonwood. There, the highway starts heading east at Cottonwood Street before reaching an intersection with Main Street.

Historic US 89A, runs through the old downtown areas of both Clarkdale and Cottonwood. From the present day traffic circle between SR 89A and Clarkdale Parkway, Historic 89A continues north along Clarkdale Parkway, turning right at Main Street in Clarkdale, and then right again at Broadway. It continues past Tuzigoot National Monument, becoming Main Street in Cottonwood, and providing access to Dead Horse Ranch State Park. The route intersects Cottonwood Street, where the bypass route now intersects Main Street.

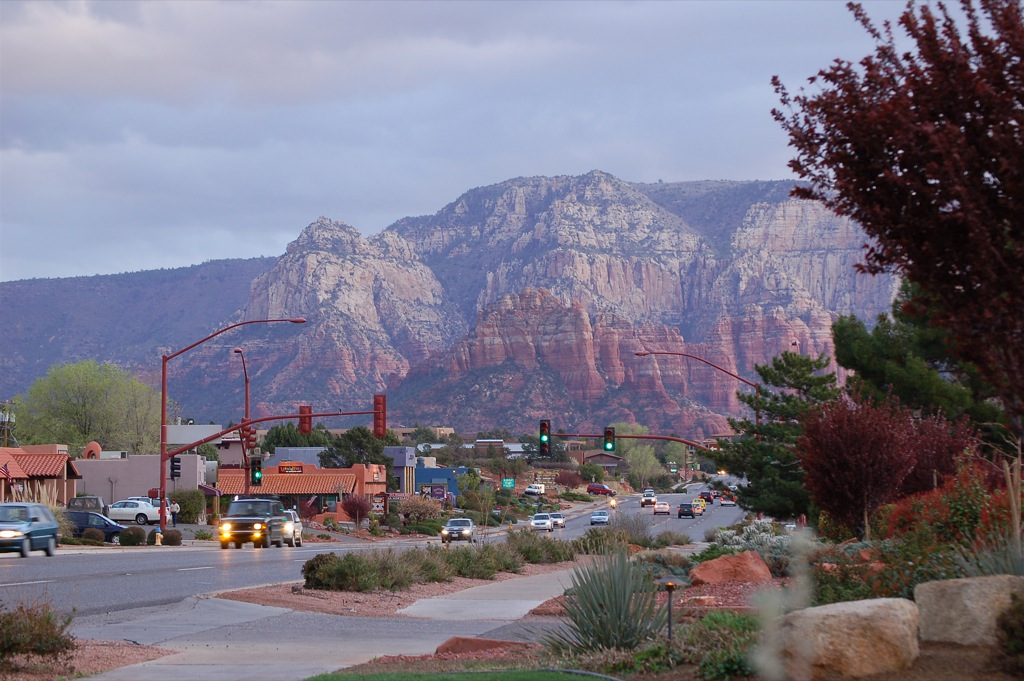
SR 89A in Sedona

Following the intersection with Cottonwood Street, the road follows Main Street to an intersection with SR 260, which heads to the south toward Camp Verde and I-17. SR 89A then moves northeastward towards Sedona. As the highway leaves Cottonwood, it again becomes a divided highway north of Rocking Chair Road, heading into desert. Before reaching Sedona, SR 89A provides access to Red Rock State Park.

The route remains a divided highway until it reaches Sedona, an arts and resort community known for its red sandstone formations. As it enters the city of Sedona, the route is known as the Si Birch Memorial Highway. The route continues east through Sedona, providing access to the Sedona Airport. SR 89A continues toward the east through Sedona to an intersection with SR 179, which heads south from this intersection through the southern part of Sedona to provide access to I-17.

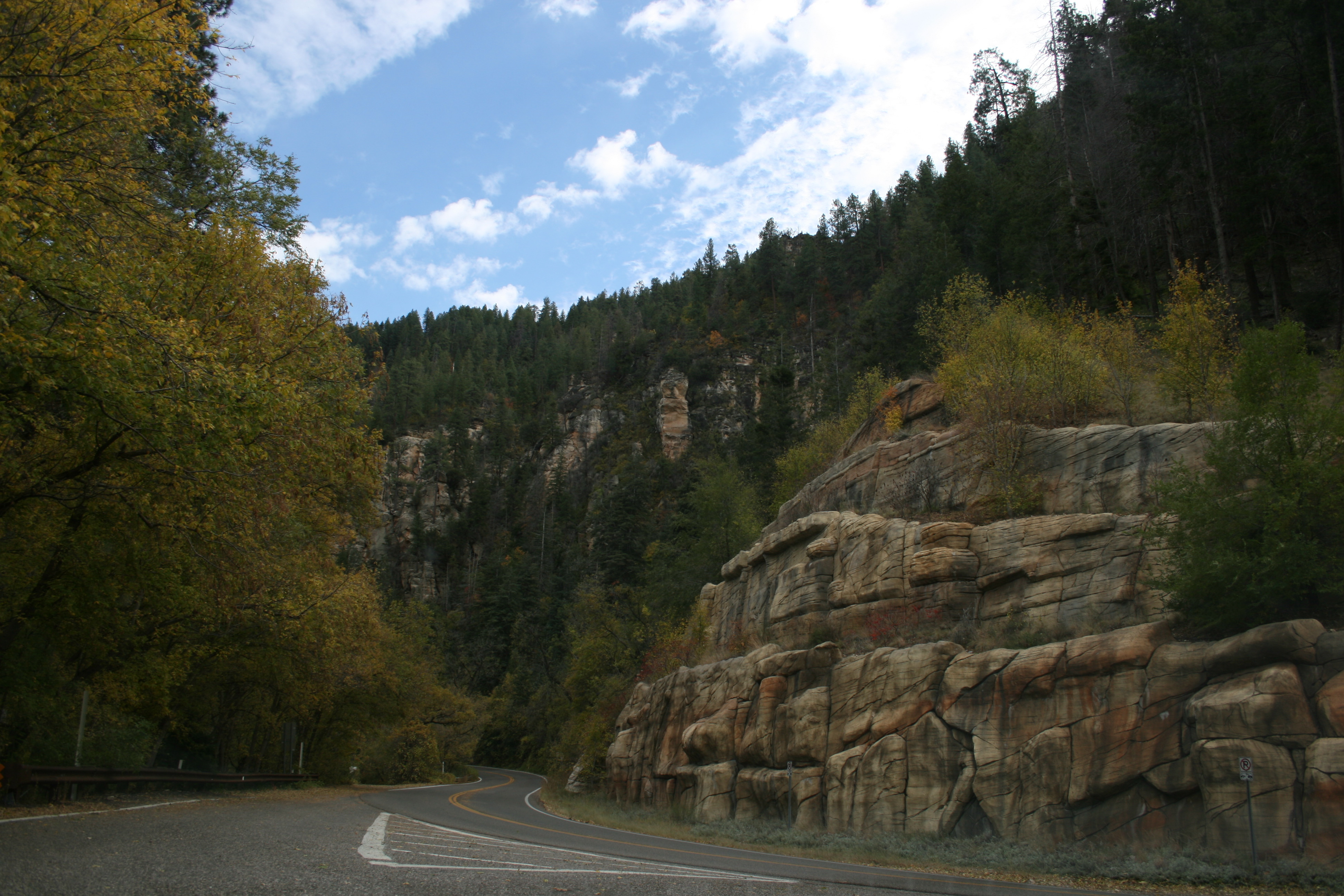
SR 89A descending Oak Creek Canyon

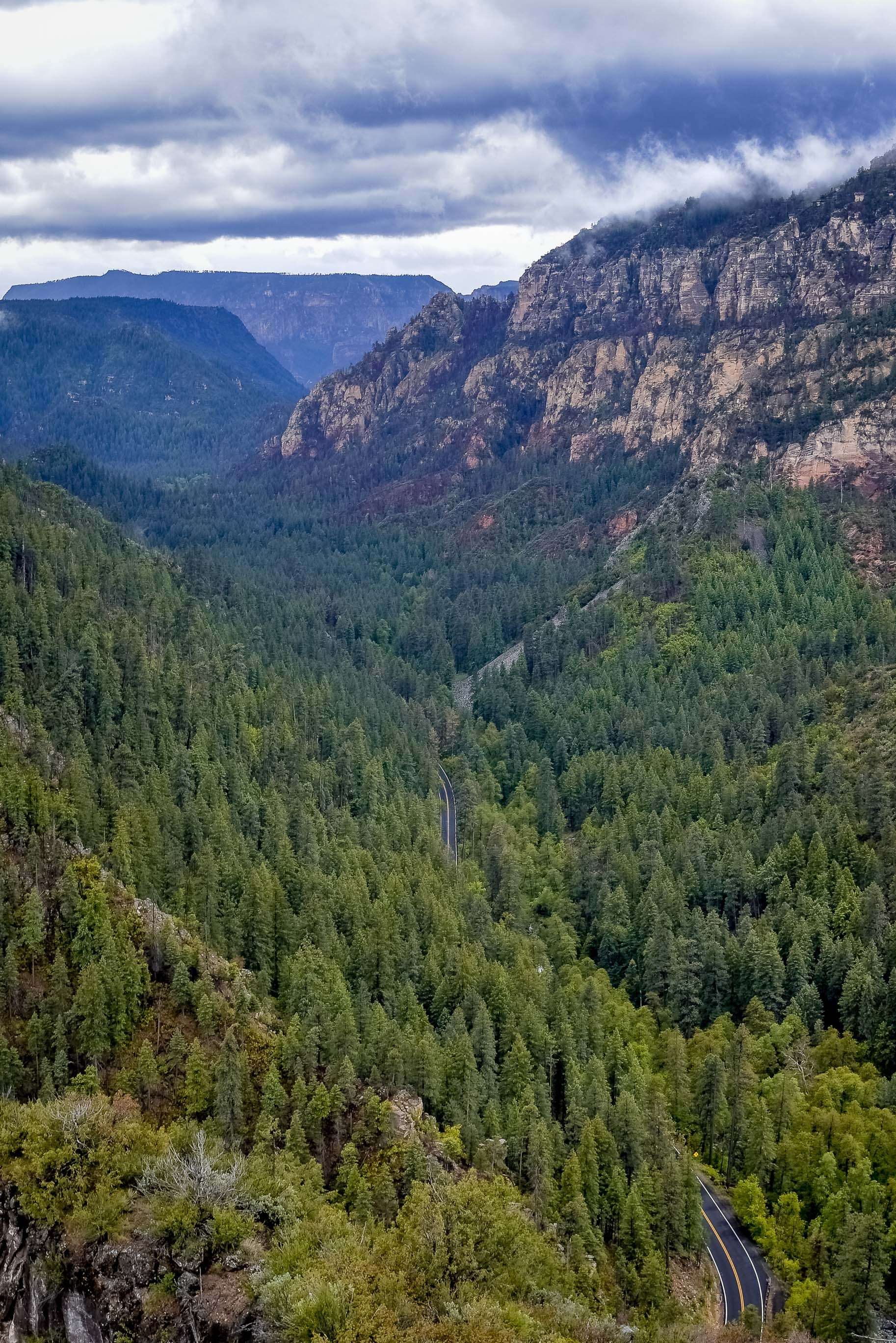
View of Oak Creek Canyon

=== Sedona to Flagstaff ===
Upon leaving Sedona, SR 89A becomes the state designated Sedona–Oak Creek Canyon Scenic Road. The highway heads northeast into a wooded area from Sedona and follows Oak Creek as it enters Oak Creek Canyon. SR 89A then curves to the north as it follows the creek and provides access to Slide Rock State Park along this portion of the highway. The roadway leaves the creek as it begins to ascend through the canyon. At the edge of the canyon, the Scenic Road designation ends.

Upon ascending, the road goes through a series of hairpin turns (no trucks over 50 ft.) toward the Mogollon Rim. The roadway continues northward away from the canyon towards Flagstaff. It curves northeastward as it passes to the west of the Forest Highlands Golf Club. The route continues to the northeast towards I-17 near Flagstaff Pulliam Airport.

SR 89A begins to run concurrently with I-17 as a freeway northward. The two highways continue north to an interchange with I-40, where I-17 terminates. The route continues north along Milton Road, to the west of Northern Arizona University before reaching its northern terminus at I-40 Business in Flagstaff.

== History ==
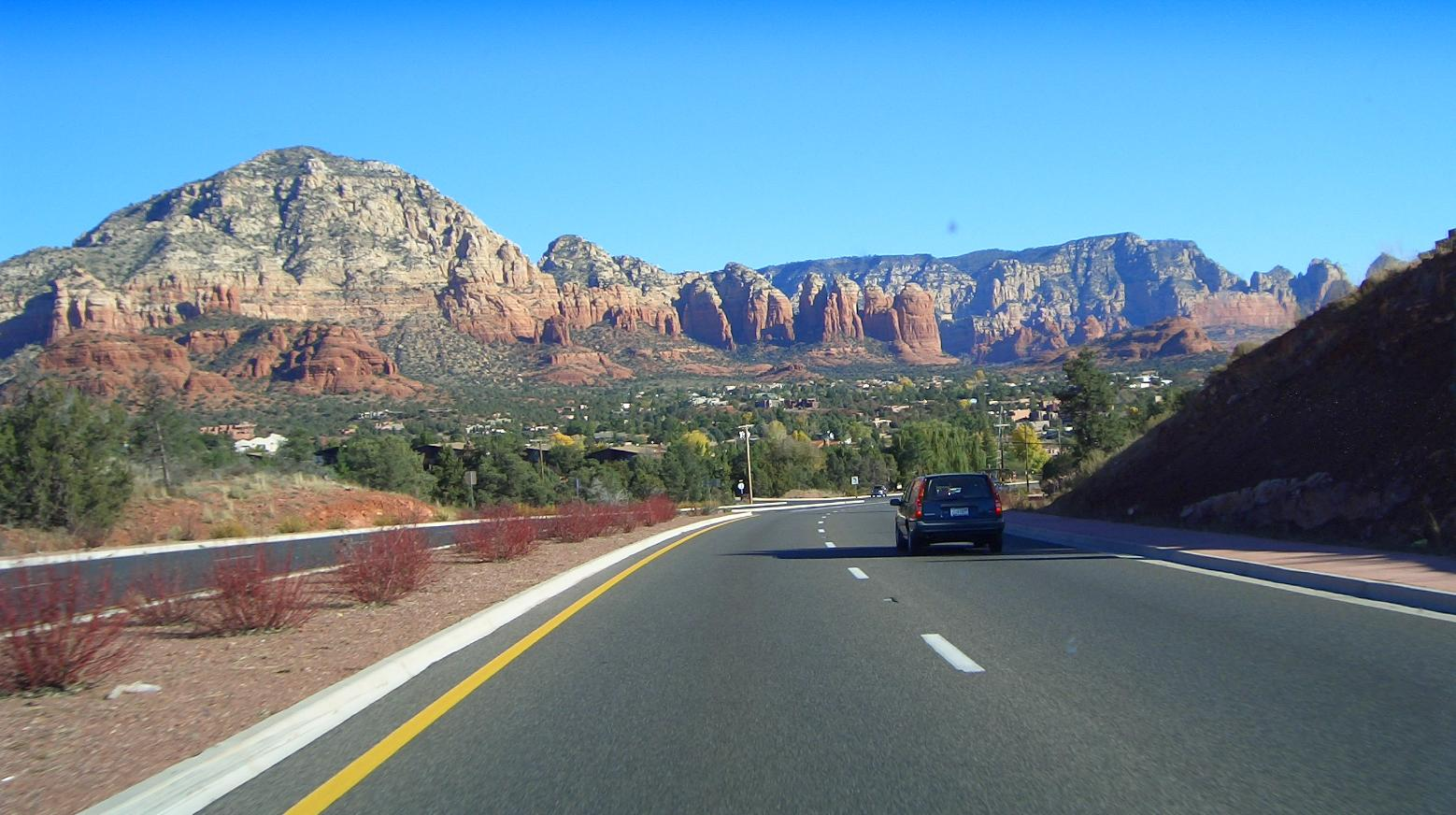
SR 89A south of Sedona

State Route 79
- Location: Prescott to Flagstaff
- Existed: 1927–1941

The routing of SR 89A was first defined as a state highway in 1927 as SR 79 by the Arizona Department of Transportation (ADOT). At the time, only the portion from Prescott to Clarkdale was built, but the remaining portion to Flagstaff had been planned. By 1929, the highway had been extended north to Sedona, although the entire highway was not paved at this time. A graded dirt road was built the following year between Flagstaff and Sedona. The southern half of the section between Sedona and Flagstaff had been improved to a gravel road by 1934, with the northern half under construction. The next year, the construction on the northern section near Flagstaff was complete. The southern end of the highway near Prescott and the section between Jerome and Cottonwood had been paved by this time. By 1938, the entire route had been paved.

By 1941, the highway was redesignated from SR 79 to US 89A. Before the establishment of the route for I-17, the only route to Flagstaff was through Prescott. There were two routes available: US 89A through Jerome, Cottonwood, Clarkdale, Sedona and Oak Creek Canyon or north through Chino Valley via US 89 to US 66. The route was redesignated from US 89A to SR 89A in 1993.

Before 2001, SR 89A had veered south into the granite dells near Watson Lake, but due to an aging Granite Creek bridge and increased traffic, Yavapai County acquired the necessary land to realign SR 89A away from the dells and near the airport.

== Junction list ==
| County | Location | mi | km | Exit | Destinations | Notes |
|---|---|---|---|---|---|---|
| Yavapai | Prescott | 317.42 | 510.84 | | SR 89 to I-40 – Prescott, Chino Valley | Southern terminus |
| Yavapai | Prescott | 317.42 | 510.84 | — | Pioneer Parkway west | Interchange; Pioneer Pkwy. exit 317 |
| Yavapai | Prescott | 318.45 | 512.50 | 318 | Larry Caldwell Drive | No exit number northbound |
| Yavapai | Prescott | 319.63 | 514.39 | 319 | Granite Dells Parkway | North end of freeway |
| Yavapai | Prescott Valley | 322.14 | 518.43 | 322 | Glassford Hill Road | South end of freeway |
| Yavapai | Prescott Valley | 323.38 | 520.43 | 323 | Viewpoint Drive | |
| Yavapai | Prescott Valley | 324.47 | 522.18 | | Fain Road (SR 89A Spur south) to SR 69 / I-17 – Phoenix, Cordes Junction | At-grade intersection; north end of freeway; northern terminus of SR 89A Spur; eastern terminus of Pioneer Parkway |
| Yavapai | Jerome | 343.50 | 552.81 | | Historic US 89A begins (Clark Street begins) | Southern end of Historic US 89A (Clark Street) concurrency; western terminus of Historic US 89A |
| Yavapai | Clarkdale | 349.01 | 561.68 | | Historic US 89A east (Clarkdale Parkway) / Cement Plant Road – Clarkdale | Northern end of Historic US 89A concurrency; roundabout |
| Yavapai | Cottonwood | 353.08 | 568.23 | | Historic US 89A west (Main Street north) – Clarkdale | Eastern terminus of Historic US 89A |
| Yavapai | Cottonwood | 355.20 | 571.64 | | SR 260 east to I-17 – Camp Verde | Western terminus of SR 260 |
| Yavapai | | 368.37 | 592.83 | | Lower Red Rock Loop Road | To Red Rock State Park |
| Yavapai | Sedona | 369.64 | 594.88 | | Upper Red Rock Loop Road | To Red Rock State Park |
| Coconino | Sedona | 374.19– 374.20 | 602.20– 602.22 | | Hyatt Drive / SR 179 south to I-17 | Roundabout; north end state maintenance; northern terminus of SR 179 |
| Coconino | Sedona | 374.84 | 603.25 | | Owenby Way – Sedona Heritage Museum | Roundabout; one-way, outbound access only; south end state maintenance |
| Coconino | Wilson Canyon | 376.09 | 605.26 | | Midgeley Bridge | |
| Coconino | Flagstaff | 398.96 | 642.06 | | Fort Tuthill County Park / Beulah Boulevard | Roundabout; north end state maintenance |
| Coconino | Flagstaff | 398.97– 399.09 | 642.08– 642.27 | | I-17 south – Phoenix | South end state maintenance; southern end of I-17 concurrency; I-17 exit 337; south end of freeway section |
| Coconino | Flagstaff | | | 339 | Lake Mary Road – Mormon Lake | Northbound exit only; exit number follows I-17 |
| Coconino | Flagstaff | 402.00 | 646.96 | 340 | I-17 ends / I-40 – Los Angeles, Albuquerque | Northern terminus of I-17; northern end of I-17 concurrency; exit number follows I-17; signed as exits 340A (east) and 340B (west); northbound left entrance from eastbound; I-40 exit 195 |
| Coconino | Flagstaff | 402.06 | 647.05 | 401 (Note: ADOT signs it as exit 341, but it is officially exit 401) | McConnell Drive | Northbound exit and southbound entrance; north end of freeway |
| Coconino | Flagstaff | 403.18 | 648.86 | | BL 40 / Historic US 66 to I-40 / US 89 / US 180 – Los Angeles, Page, Grand Canyon | Northern terminus; road continues as I-40 BL/Historic US 66 east (Milton Road north) |
1.000 mi = 1.609 km; 1.000 km = 0.621 mi: Concurrency terminus; Incomplete access

== Spur route ==
State Route 89A Spur
- Fain Road
- Location: Prescott Valley
- Length: 7.22 mi (11.62 km)
- Existed: July 16, 2004–present

A map of the unsigned spur highlighted in red.

State Route 89A Spur (SR 89A Spur or SS 89A) is a 7.22-mile-long (11.62 km) unsigned highway routed along Fain Road in Prescott Valley. SR 89A Spur was originally established on July 16, 2004, over a small section of Fain Road immediately east of the intersection with SR 89A proper. The route was extended over the remainder of Fain Road to SR 69 on August 18, 2011. The road was originally two lanes wide but has since been widened to a four-lane divided highway. Its primary purpose is as an eastern bypass around Prescott. The Central Yavapai Metropolitan Planning Organization planned a freeway to connect SR 169 and SR 89A via Fain Road/SR 89A Spur as part of their 2025 regional plan.

=== Major junctions ===
The entire route is in Yavapai County.

| Location | mi | km | Exit | Destinations | Notes |
|---|---|---|---|---|---|
| | 7.22 | 11.62 | | SR 69 – Prescott, Phoenix | Southern terminus; road continues as Prescott Country Club Boulevard |
| | 3.28 | 5.28 | 328 | Lakeshore Drive | Interchange |
| Prescott Valley | 0.00 | 0.00 | | SR 89A to SR 89 – Prescott, Cottonwood | Northern terminus; road continues as SR 89A south (Pioneer Parkway west) |
1.000 mi = 1.609 km; 1.000 km = 0.621 mi

== Historic route ==
Jerome–Clarkdale–Cottonwood Historic Road
- Location: Jerome to Cottonwood
- Length: 10.9 mi (17.5 km)

U.S. Route 89A Historic (Historic US 89A) is a 10.9-mile-long (17.5 km) stretch of former US Route 89A between Jerome and Cottonwood. Its western terminus is at the southwest edges of Jerome town limits, along SR 89A. In Clarkdale, the historic route splits from SR 89A, passing through downtown Clarkdale and downtown Cottonwood. Its eastern terminus is at SR 89A, at the intersection of Main Street and Cottonwood Street.

=== Major intersections ===
The entire route is in Yavapai County.

| Location | mi | km | Destinations | Notes |
|---|---|---|---|---|
| Jerome | 0.00 | 0.00 | SR 89A south | West end of SR 89A concurrency; continuation beyond western terminus |
| Clarkdale | 5.3 | 8.5 | SR 89A north / Cement Plant Road | Roundabout; east end of SR 89A concurrency |
| Cottonwood | 10.9 | 17.5 | SR 89A | Eastern terminus; road continues as SR 89A north (Main Street east) |
1.000 mi = 1.609 km; 1.000 km = 0.621 mi: Concurrency terminus

== See also ==
- Mariposa, a restaurant on Route 89A in Sedona
