= Arizona State Route 179 =

State highway in Arizona

State Route 179
- SR 179 highlighted in red

Route information
- Maintained by ADOT
- Length: 14.49 mi (23.32 km)
- Tourist routes: Red Rock Scenic Road

Major junctions
- South end: I-17 south of Village of Oak Creek
- North end: SR 89A in Sedona

Location
- Country: United States
- State: Arizona

Highway system
- Arizona State Highway System; Interstate; US; State; Scenic Proposed; Former
← SR 177	→ SR 180A

State Route 179, also known as SR 179 or the Red Rock Scenic Byway, is a north–south state highway in Arizona, United States, running from Interstate 17 to SR 89A in Sedona, entering Coconino County from Yavapai County. In 2006, the United States Department of Transportation awarded SR 179 its highest designation within the National Scenic Byways Program: the All-American Road designation, due to the red rock and sandstone formations through which it travels along its 7.5-mile (12.1 km) length within the hills of the Coconino National Forest. The All-American Road designation also signifies to the traveling public that this is a road that is "a destination unto itself."

== Route description ==
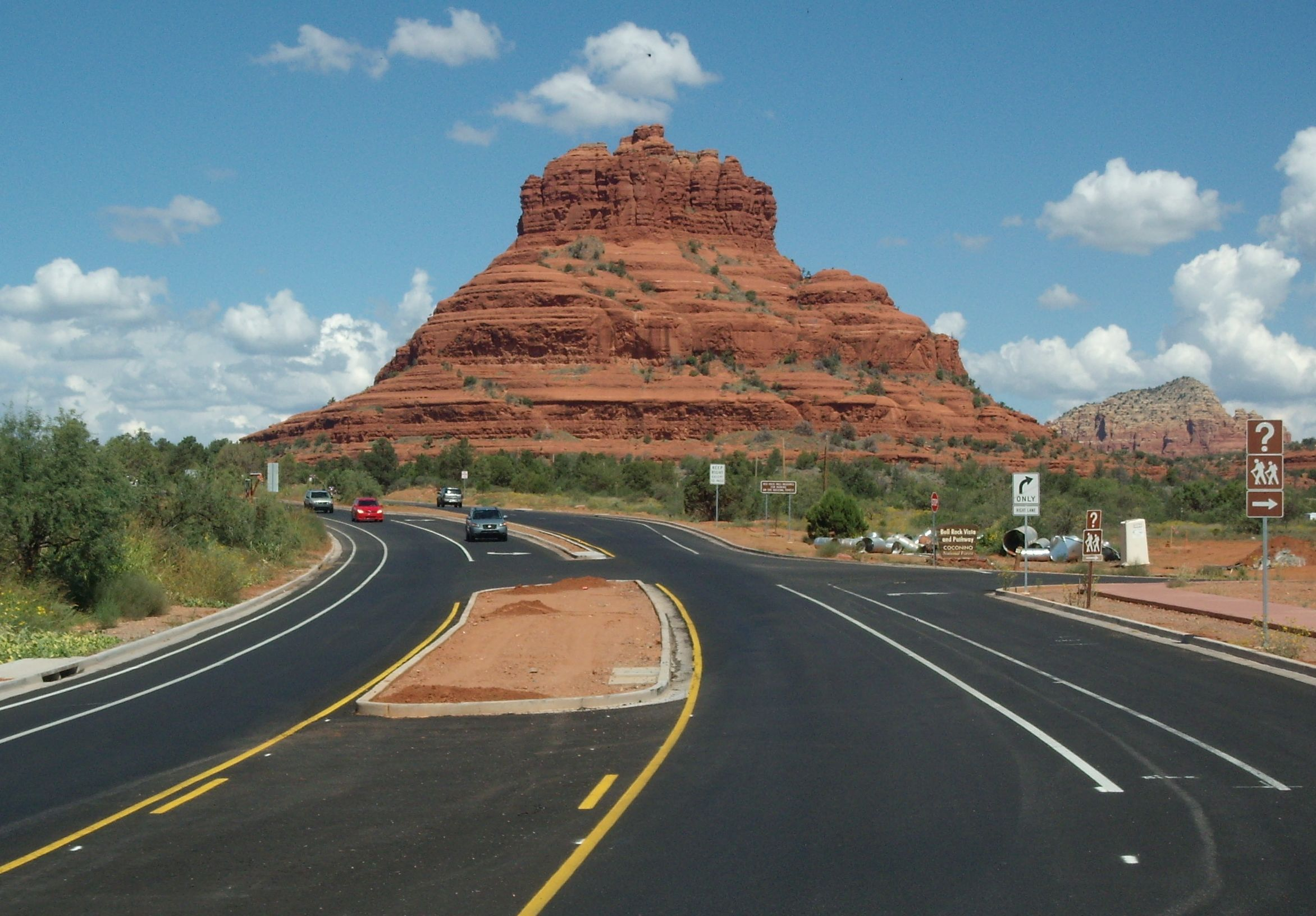
SR 179 at Bell Rock

The southern terminus of SR 179 is at exit 298 off of I-17; the exit is about 15 miles (24 km) north of Camp Verde. SR 179 heads northwest from the interchange briefly before curving towards the north. It keeps this heading as it passes through the red rock area of the Village of Oak Creek on its way to Sedona, just a few miles north. As it enters the Sedona city limits, it roughly follows along the east bank of Oak Creek. It crosses the creek near Tlaquepaque Arts and Shopping Village, just before reaching its northern terminus at SR 89A.

== History ==
The original SR 179 was designated between 1935 and 1939 from SR 79 (now SR 89A) to SR 69 in Prescott Valley. By 1960, this route was cancelled, and SR 179 was designated on its current route.

== Junction list ==
County	Location	mi	km	Destinations	Notes
Yavapai		0.00	0.00	I-17 – Flagstaff, Phoenix	Southern terminus; I-17 exit 298; continues south as Forest Service Road 618
Coconino	Sedona	14.49	23.32	SR 89A / Hyatt Drive – Cottonwood, Flagstaff	Roundabout; northern terminus; former US 89A
1.000 mi = 1.609 km; 1.000 km = 0.621 mi
