= Arizona State Route 89 =

State highway in Arizona, United States

State Route 89
- SR 89 highlighted in red

Route information
- Maintained by ADOT, City of Prescott
- Length: 104.53 mi (168.22 km)
- Existed: June 13, 1992 (from U.S. Route 89)–present

Major junctions
- South end: US 93 in Wickenburg
- SR 71 in Congress; SR 69 in Prescott; SR 89A in Prescott
- North end: I-40 in Ash Fork

Location
- Country: United States
- State: Arizona
- County: Yavapai

Highway system
- Arizona State Highway System; Interstate; US; State; Scenic Proposed; Former
← US 89	→ US 89A

State Route 89 (SR 89) is a 104.53-mile (168.22 km) state highway in the U.S. state of Arizona. It is part of the former route of U.S. Route 89 (US 89) throughout the state.

== Route description ==
The southern terminus of SR 89 is located at an intersection with U.S. Route 93 northwest of Wickenburg. It is a largely south–north route; the largest city through which it now passes is Prescott, where it meets SR 69 and the extremely scenic SR 89A. The segment between Prescott and Congress (intersection with SR 71) is quite scenic. The northern terminus of the highway is located at an interchange with Interstate 40 (I-40) in Ash Fork.

== History ==
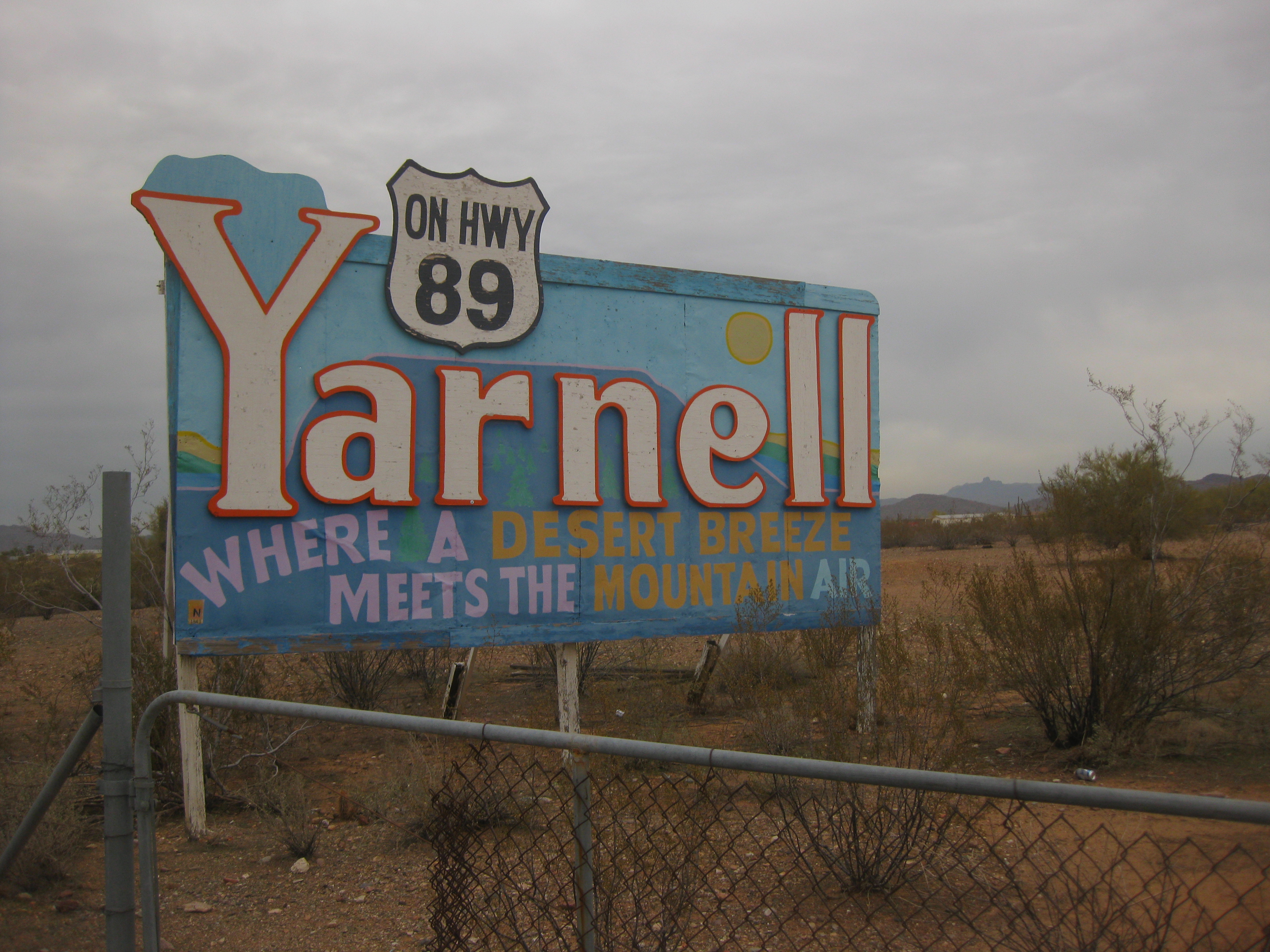
Yarnell, Arizona, along SR 89

This highway was a segment of US 89 between Ash Fork at I-40 and US 93 northwest of Wickenburg until June 13, 1992 when the US 89 designation was removed south of US 89's current southern terminus with Interstate 40 in Flagstaff. Interstate highways offered shorter and more direct routes than the old long-distance US 89 in central and southern Arizona.

== Junction list ==
The entire route is in Yavapai County.

Location	mi	km	Destinations	Notes
Wickenburg	0.00	0.00	US 93 – Wickenburg, Phoenix, Kingman	Southern terminus; former US 89/SR 93 south
Congress	9.88	15.90	SR 71 south – Kingman, Los Angeles	
Prescott	52.00	83.69	Copper Basin Road / Brookside Boulevard	North end state maintenance
Prescott	54.43	87.60	Overland Road – Veterans Cemetery	Right-in/right-out interchange; northbound exit only; south end state maintenance
Prescott	54.55	87.79	SR 69 south – Prescott Valley, Phoenix	Interchange; no southbound exit
Prescott	54.55	87.79	Gurley Street	Partial interchange; southbound left exit only; northbound access is via Aven Drive intersection
Prescott	54.74	88.10	VA Medical Center	North end state maintenance
Prescott	56.91	91.59	Prescott Lakes Parkway to SR 69 – Phoenix	
Prescott	61.09	98.31	SR 89A north (Pioneer Parkway) to SR 69 – Prescott Valley, Jerome, Cottonwood, Phoenix, Yavapai County Fairgrounds	Interchange; former US 89A north; Pioneer Parkway exit 317
Prescott	58.13	93.55	Willow Creek Road / Deep Well Ranch Road – Prescott Airport	Roundabout; south end state maintenance
Ash Fork	104.53	168.22	I-40 – Flagstaff, Williams, Grand Canyon, Los Angeles BL 40 west / Historic US 66 west – Ash Fork	Northern terminus; I-40 exit 146; highway continues as BL 40/Historic US 66 west
1.000 mi = 1.609 km; 1.000 km = 0.621 mi: Incomplete access

== See also ==
- Drake, Arizona, site of the old Hell Canyon Bridge formerly used by US 89, now on the National Register of Historic Places.
