= Arizona State Route 169 =

State highway in Arizona, United States

State Route 169
- SR 169 highlighted in red

Route information
- Maintained by ADOT
- Length: 15.16 mi (24.40 km)
- Existed: 1971–present

Major junctions
- South end: SR 69 in Dewey-Humboldt
- North end: I-17 near Camp Verde

Location
- Country: United States
- State: Arizona

Highway system
- Arizona State Highway System; Interstate; US; State; Scenic Proposed; Former
← SR 166	→ SR 170

State Route 169, also known as SR 169 and Cherry Road, is an east–west highway in central Arizona, with its western terminus at its junction with its parent road State Route 69 at Dewey and its eastern terminus at Exit 278 of Interstate 17. In conjunction with SR 69 and I-17, it serves as the most direct route between Prescott and the Verde Valley, bypassing the scenic, but dangerous mountain grades of State Route 89A through Jerome.

Despite its east–west alignment, this highway is marked as a north–south route.

== Route description ==
The western terminus of SR 169 is located at a junction with SR 69 in Dewey. It heads east from this intersection through Dewey along Cherry Road. After briefly heading in an easterly direction, the highway curves towards the northeast. It curves back towards the southeast near Old Cherry Road. The highway continues along this heading until it reaches its eastern terminus at an interchange with I-17 southwest of Camp Verde.

== History ==
The route was established in 1957 along its current route.

== Junction list ==
The entire route is in Yavapai County.

Location	mi	km	Destinations	Notes
Dewey-Humboldt	0.00	0.00	SR 69 – Prescott	
	15.16	24.40	I-17 – Flagstaff, Phoenix	I-17 exit 278
1.000 mi = 1.609 km; 1.000 km = 0.621 mi
