= Interstate 17 =

Interstate Highway in central Arizona

Interstate 17
- Arizona Veterans Highway
- I-17 highlighted in red

Route information
- Maintained by ADOT
- Length: 145.93 mi (234.85 km)
- Existed: August 14, 1957–present
- History: Completed in 1978
- NHS: Entire route

Major junctions
- South end: I-10 / US 60 in Phoenix
- I-10 in Phoenix; US 60 in Phoenix; Loop 101 in Phoenix; Loop 303 in Phoenix; SR 74 in Phoenix; SR 69 in Cordes Lakes; SR 169 near Dewey-Humboldt; SR 260 in Camp Verde; SR 179 near Sedona; SR 89A in Flagstaff
- North end: I-40 / SR 89A in Flagstaff

Location
- Country: United States
- State: Arizona
- Counties: Maricopa, Yavapai, Coconino

Highway system
- Interstate Highway System; Main; Auxiliary; Suffixed; Business; Future; Arizona State Highway System; Interstate; US; State; Scenic Proposed; Former
← I-15	→ I-19

Interstate 17 (I-17) is a north–south Interstate Highway located entirely within the US state of Arizona. I-17's southern terminus lies in Phoenix, at I-10/US 60 and its northern terminus is in Flagstaff, at I-40.

Most of I-17 is known as the Arizona Veterans Highway. In the Phoenix metropolitan area, it is mostly known as the Black Canyon Freeway, however, the southern 4.16 miles (6.69 km) are part of the Maricopa Freeway. The portion of the highway south of Cordes Lakes was built along the alignment of State Route 69 (SR 69), while the northern part was built along old SR 79's alignment. The final section of I-17 was completed in 1978.

I-17 gains more than one mile (1.6 km) in elevation between Phoenix at 1,117 feet (340 m) and Flagstaff at 7,000 feet (2,100 m). The highway features several scenic view exits along its route that overlook the many mountains and valleys in northern Arizona.

== Route description ==
I-17 is known as the Black Canyon Freeway from the northern end of the Phoenix Metropolitan Area to a point 2.2 miles (3.5 km) south of The Stack interchange with I-10 northwest of Downtown Phoenix. (It is accompanied by frontage roads for most of this portion, and they carry the Black Canyon Highway name to distinguish from the freeway status.) At the Durango Curve southwest of downtown, between the 19th Avenue and Buckeye Road interchanges, it picks up the designation Maricopa Freeway all the way to the southern terminus at the second I-10 junction. It is one of the metropolitan area's primary freeways. It has two interchanges with I-10 in Phoenix.

The northern portion of the B Line of the Valley Metro Rail & Streetcar system runs over a bridge of I-17 from Mountain View Road to Metro Parkway, serving one station at Metro Parkway.

I-17 ends at I-40 and SR 89A (Milton Road) in Flagstaff.

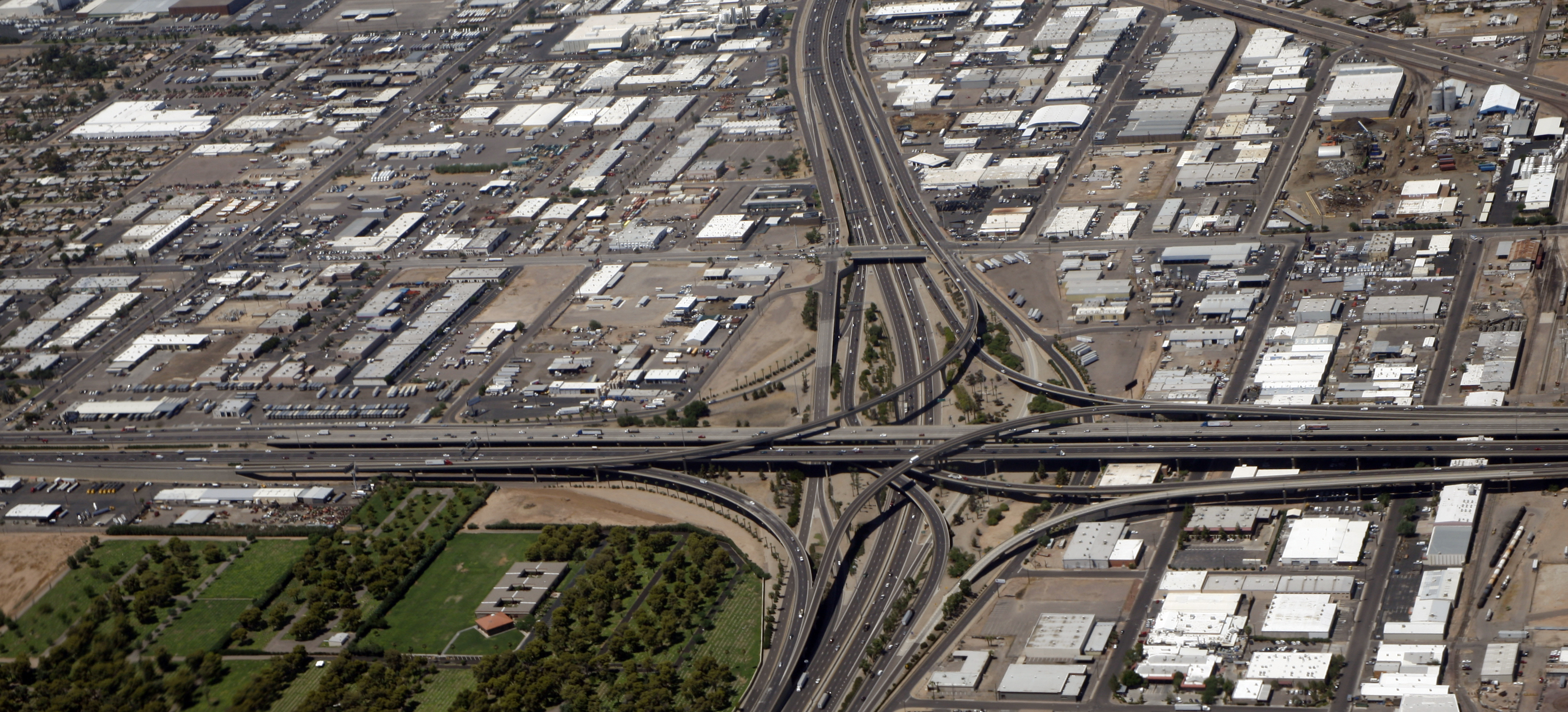
"The Stack", intersection of I-10 and I-17. Looking north up I-17, downtown Phoenix.

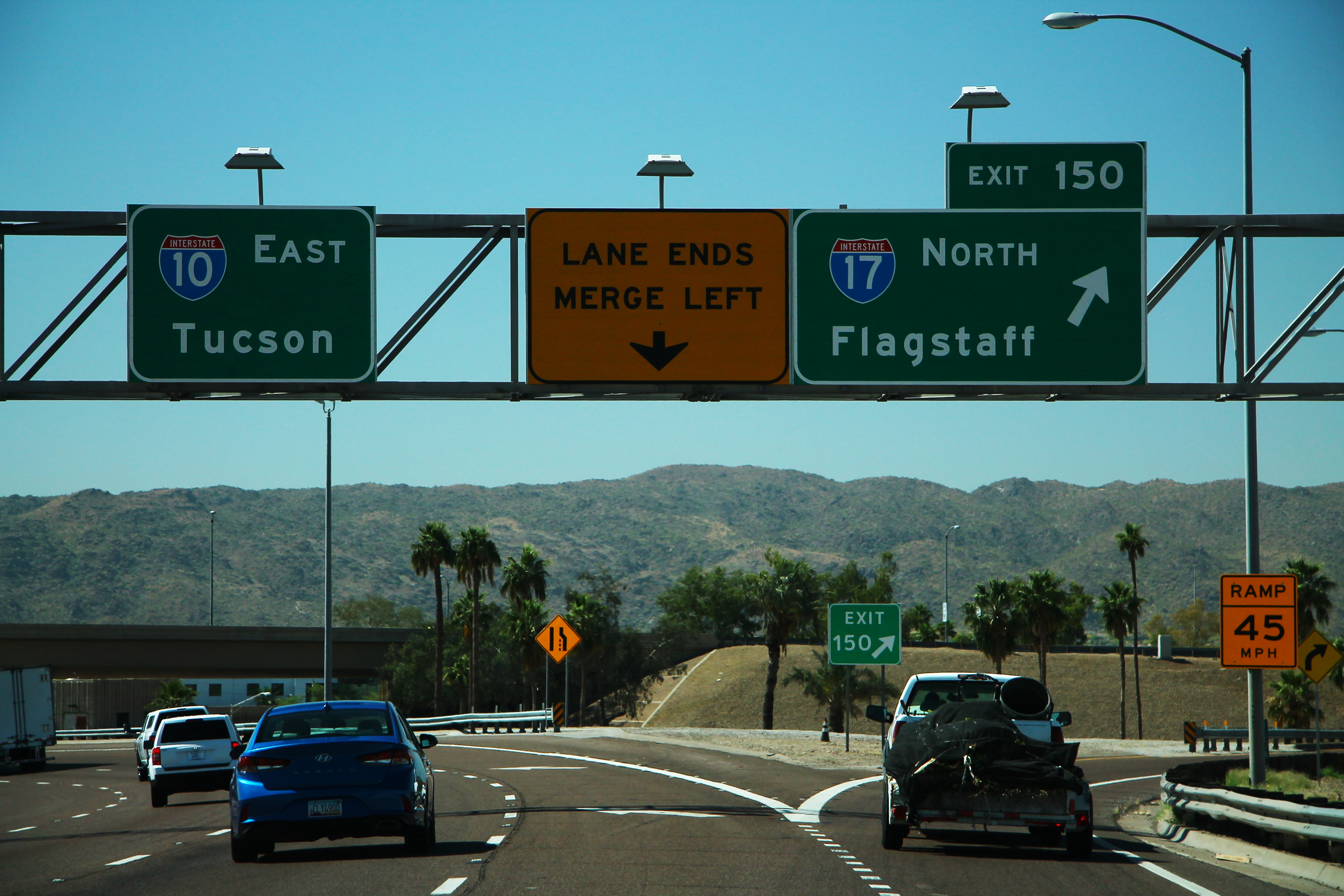
Southern terminus at I-10 in Phoenix

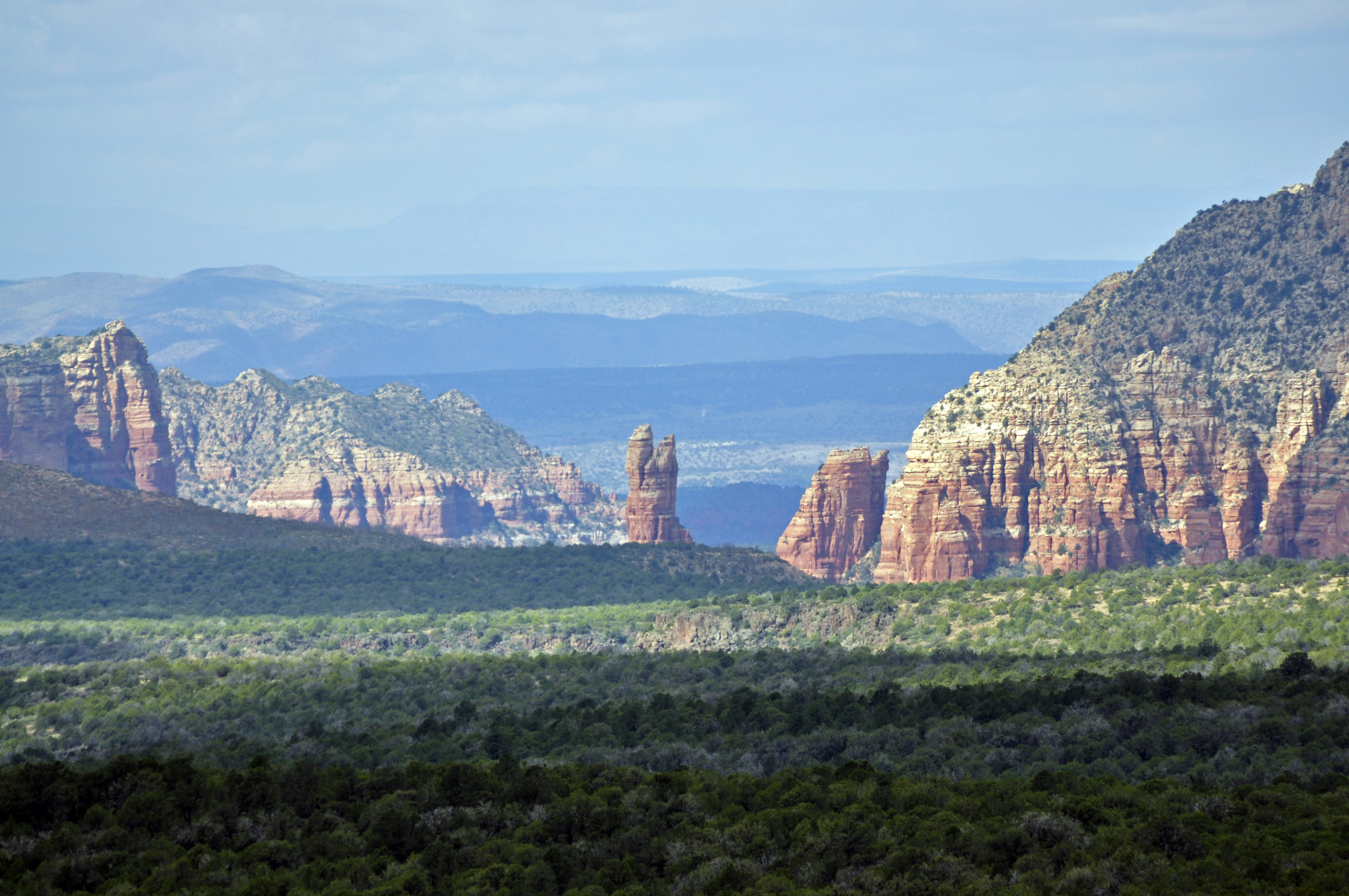
View of the Red Rocks of Sedona from I-17, just south of Munds Park

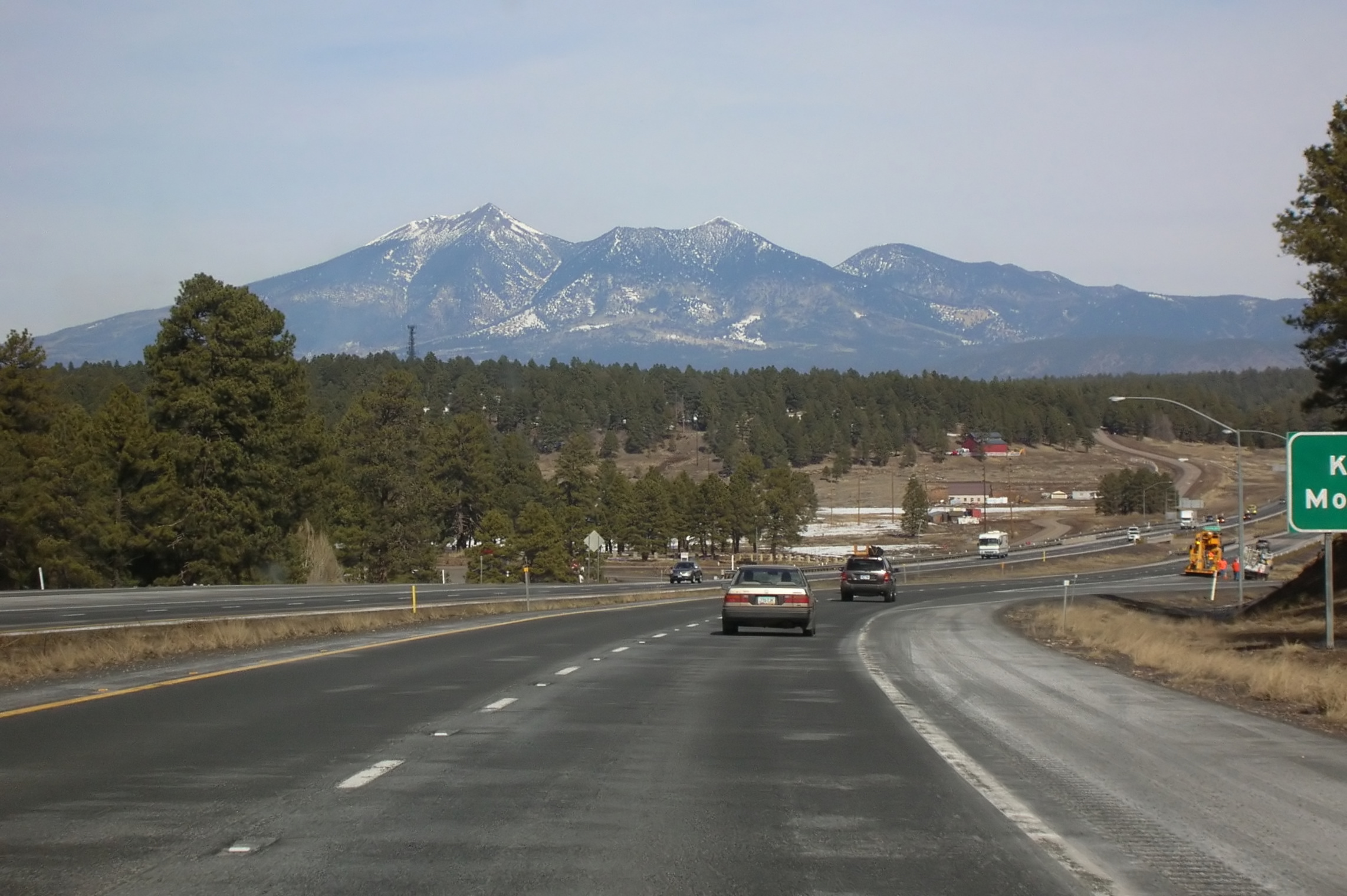
I-17 near Flagstaff

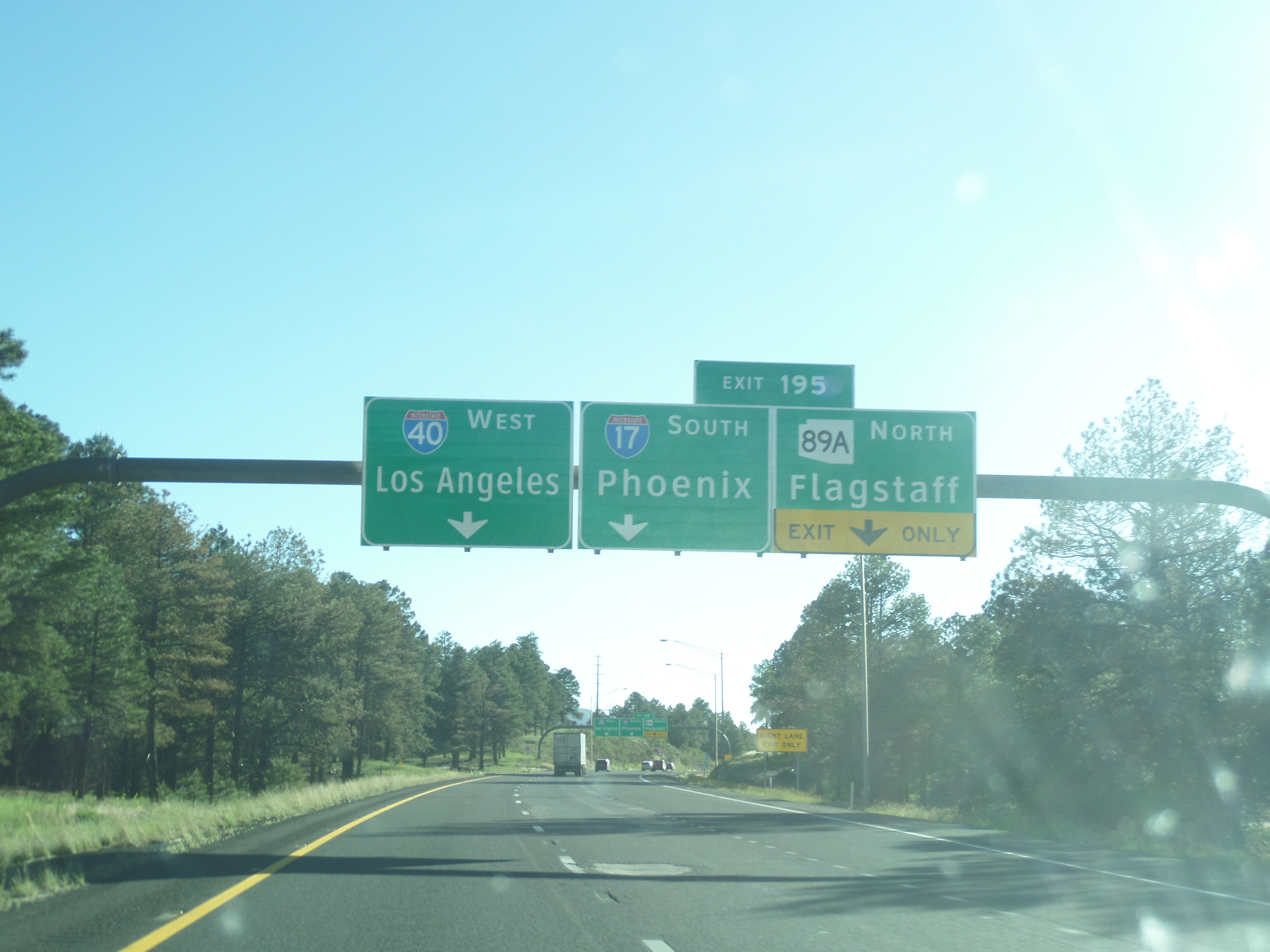
Northern terminus at I-40 as seen from I-40 in Flagstaff

== History ==
The I-17 corridor roughly follows the first stagecoach route through the Black Canyon, established in 1878 between Cañon (now Black Canyon City) and Prescott. A later highway through White Spar from Wickenburg to Yarnell was improved in 1925 and incorporated into US 89 in 1926.

In 1936, SR 69 was established as a state route from Phoenix north to Prescott. The road was completed by 1940 to Prescott. In 1954, a new route north to Flagstaff was established as SR 79. In May 1956, the Black Canyon Highway from Phoenix to Flagstaff was completed, but not to Interstate standards. It was incorporated into the new Interstate Highway System, established by the federal government later that year, and designated as part of I-17.

The first interchange on the Black Canyon Freeway was built in 1950 west of downtown Phoenix and was extended to Grand Avenue in 1957. The freeway was extended to McDowell Road by 1971 and out of the Phoenix suburbs by 1974, at a cost of $33 million. By 1971, I-17 had been completed from Phoenix northward to Camp Verde where a short stretch had not been completed to standards. The stretch from SR 279 (now SR 260) north to SR 179 was also complete. The largest section yet to be completed was from SR 179 north to Flagstaff. This segment was still just a two-lane roadway, but it did have full traffic interchanges built at crossroads. The portion from I-40 south to the Flagstaff Municipal Airport had been completed by this time. The final section of I-17, near Camp Verde and Montezuma Castle, began construction in February 1977 and opened to traffic in August 1978.

In 1993, officials in Arizona proposed an extension of I-17 to connect with I-15 in Utah,, but plans were ultimately scrapped due to environmental concerns.

The existing interchange with Happy Valley Road in Phoenix was converted to a diverging diamond interchange (DDI). The project was finished in the fall of 2020.

Due to increasing weekend traffic on I-17 between the Phoenix area and northern Arizona, primarily between Phoenix in the south, and Sedona, Flagstaff, and the Grand Canyon in the north, ADOT started plans to widen a 34-mile (55 km) section of four-lane freeway between Anthem and the Sunset Point Rest Area in 2018. In 2021, the design was chosen, with a standard third general-purpose lane set to be added in both directions between Anthem and Black Canyon City, but due to the mountainous topography north of Black Canyon City to Sunset Point, two flex lanes will be added in a separate carriageway next to the existing southbound lanes. The lanes will be allocated depending on whichever direction has the most traffic, generally this will be northbound traffic from Monday through Saturday, and southbound traffic on Sundays. A combination of six different safety systems (vehicle arresting barriers, automated arm gates, concrete barriers, steel gates, dynamic messaging signs, and cameras) will control access to these lanes. Construction began in 2022 and in May 2025, the additional lanes from Anthem to Black Canyon City opened. The flex lanes were completed in December of 2025.

== Exit list ==
I-17 has the unusual distinction of starting at approximately milepost 194 instead of at milepost 0. This is a holdover from Arizona's old system of marking mileposts, where a branching route would continue the milepost numbering of its original host, instead of starting over at zero. I-17 inherited its milepost locations from SR 69, which the freeway replaced between Phoenix and Cordes Junction. SR 69's mileposting was such that it coincided with US 89's mileposting, which was 201.6 where the two routes intersected. When I-17 was constructed, the existing mileposting for SR 69 was retained.

County	Location	mi	km	Exit	Destinations	Notes
Maricopa	Phoenix	0.00	0.00		I-10 east / US 60 east – Globe, Tucson	Southern end of US 60 concurrency; southern terminus; Maricopa Freeway continues east as I-10/US 60; I-10 exit 150A
Maricopa	Phoenix	0.31	0.50	194	I-10 west – Sky Harbor	Southbound exit and northbound entrance; I-10 exit 150B
Maricopa	Phoenix	1.14	1.83	195A	16th Street	Southbound exit and northbound entrance
Maricopa	Phoenix	2.15	3.46	195B	7th Street / Central Avenue	No southbound signage for Central Avenue
Maricopa	Phoenix	3.16	5.09	196	7th Avenue / Central Avenue	No northbound signage for Central Avenue
Maricopa	Phoenix	4.16	6.69	197	19th Avenue / Durango Street	No northbound signage for Durango Street
Maricopa	Phoenix				SR 30 west (Tres Rios Freeway)	Planned interchange at Durango Curve
Maricopa	Phoenix			West end of Maricopa Freeway; South end of Black Canyon Freeway		
Maricopa	Phoenix	5.03	8.10	198	Buckeye Road (Historic US 80)	Northbound exit only
Maricopa	Phoenix	5.34	8.59	199A	Grant Street / Buckeye Road (Historic US 80)	No northbound signage for Buckeye Road
Maricopa	Phoenix	5.73	9.22	199B	Jefferson Street	Southbound exit only
Maricopa	Phoenix	5.88	9.46	199B	Adams Street / Van Buren Street	Northbound exit and entrance only; Van Buren Street is former I-10 BL
Maricopa	Phoenix	6.49	10.44	200A	I-10 – Central Phoenix, Los Angeles	The Stack; I-10 exit 143
Maricopa	Phoenix	7.05	11.35	200B	McDowell Road / Van Buren Street	No northbound signage for Van Buren Street
Maricopa	Phoenix	7.84	12.62		US 60 west (Grand Avenue)	Planned HOV-only interchange; northbound exit and southbound entrance; to be northern end of US 60 concurrency
Maricopa	Phoenix	7.84	12.62	—	US 60 / US 89 / SR 93 (Grand Avenue)	Closed in the 1980s; former US 60/US 70/US 89/SR 93
Maricopa	Phoenix	8.09	13.02	201	Thomas Road to US 60 west (Grand Avenue)	Northern end of US 60 concurrency; no southbound signage for Grand Avenue
Maricopa	Phoenix	9.08	14.61	202	Indian School Road	
Maricopa	Phoenix	10.08	16.22	203	Camelback Road	
Maricopa	Phoenix	11.09	17.85	204	Bethany Home Road	
Maricopa	Phoenix	12.09	19.46	205	Glendale Avenue	
Maricopa	Phoenix	13.09	21.07	206	Northern Avenue	
Maricopa	Phoenix	14.14	22.76	207	Dunlap Avenue	
Maricopa	Phoenix	15.13	24.35	208	Peoria Avenue	
Maricopa	Phoenix	16.13	25.96	209	Cactus Road	
Maricopa	Phoenix	17.12	27.55	210	Thunderbird Road	
Maricopa	Phoenix	18.12	29.16	211	Greenway Road	
Maricopa	Phoenix	19.13	30.79	212	Bell Road	
Maricopa	Phoenix	20.15	32.43	214A-B	Union Hills Drive / Yorkshire Drive	Signed separately as exits 214A (Union Hills) and 214B (Yorkshire) northbound; Union Hills Drive was formerly signed as exit 213
Maricopa	Phoenix	21.11	33.97	214C	Loop 101	Loop 101 exits 23B-C; northbound entrance includes direct exit ramp onto Deer Valley Road (exit 215B)
Maricopa	Phoenix	21.66– 22.16	34.86– 35.66	215	Rose Garden Lane / Deer Valley Road	Signed as exit 215A northbound and 215B southbound
Maricopa	Phoenix	23.27	37.45	217	Pinnacle Peak Road	
Maricopa	Phoenix	24.19	38.93	218	Happy Valley Road	
Maricopa	Phoenix	25.23	40.60	219	Jomax Road	
Maricopa	Phoenix	27.25	43.85	220	Dixileta Drive	Northbound exit and southbound entrance
Maricopa	Phoenix	28.19	45.37	221A	Loop 303 south (Bob Stump Memorial Parkway)	Future flyover interchange; to be signed as exit 221B southbound; Loop 303 exits 138A-B; future clockwise terminus of Loop 303
Maricopa	Phoenix	28.19	45.37	221	Loop 303 south (Bob Stump Memorial Parkway) / Sonoran Desert Drive	Loop 303 exit 138; current clockwise terminus of Loop 303
Maricopa	Phoenix	28.19	45.37	Northern terminus of Black Canyon Freeway		
Maricopa	Phoenix	29.17	46.94	222	Dove Valley Road	
Maricopa	Phoenix	30.17	48.55	223	SR 74 west (Carefree Highway) – Wickenburg	Signed as exits 223A (east) and 223B (west) northbound; eastern terminus of SR 74
Maricopa	Anthem	31.70	51.02	225	Pioneer Road	
Maricopa	Anthem	33.21	53.45	227	Daisy Mountain Drive	
Maricopa	Anthem	35.24	56.71	229	Anthem Way	
Maricopa	New River	38.20	61.48	232	New River	
Maricopa	New River	42.18	67.88	236	Table Mesa Road	
Maricopa–Yavapai county line	Black Canyon City	48.29	77.72	242	Black Canyon City, Rock Springs	Former I-17 BL north; No southbound entrance
Yavapai	Black Canyon City	50.56	81.37	244	Black Canyon City	Former I-17 BL south
Yavapai				—	I-17 north (Flex Lanes)	South end of reversible Flex lanes
Yavapai		54.36	87.48	248	Bumble Bee, Crown King	No access to or from Flex Lanes
Yavapai				—	I-17 south (Flex Lanes)	North end of reversible Flex lanes; no access to southbound Flex Lanes from Sunset Point Rest Area
Yavapai		58.48	94.11	252	Sunset Point Rest Area and Scenic View	Frontage roads provide all-direction access to a unified Rest Area / Scenic View off west side of freeway
Yavapai		61.85	99.54	256	Badger Springs Road	
Yavapai	Cordes Lakes	65.23	104.98	259	Bloody Basin Road	
Yavapai	Cordes Lakes	68.44	110.14	262	SR 69 north / Cordes Lakes Road – Prescott	Northbound exit and southbound entrance
Yavapai	Cordes Lakes	68.77	110.67	263	Arcosanti Road to SR 69 north – Prescott	Northbound exit signed as Arcosanti Road only
Yavapai		74.53	119.94	268	Orme Road / Dugas Road	
Yavapai		84.16	135.44	278	SR 169 south – Dewey-Humboldt, Prescott	Northern terminus of SR 169
Yavapai		89.04	143.30	—	Runaway Truck ramp	Northbound left exit and southbound left entrance
Yavapai	Camp Verde	91.31	146.95	285	General Crook Trail	
Yavapai	Camp Verde	93.06	149.77	287	SR 260 to SR 89A – Cottonwood, Payson	Former SR 279
Yavapai	Camp Verde	95.74	154.08	289	Montezuma Castle National Monument	
Yavapai	Verde River			Dan Bell Memorial Bridge		
Yavapai	Lake Montezuma	99.04	159.39	293	CR 30 west – McGuireville, Cornville, Montezuma Well	Eastern terminus of CR 30
Yavapai		102.29– 102.36	164.62– 164.73	McGuireville Rest Areas		
Yavapai		104.75	168.58	298	SR 179 north – Sedona	Southern terminus of SR 179
Yavapai		112.09	180.39	306	Stoneman Lake Road	
Coconino		118.67	190.98	Scenic View (southbound only)		
Coconino		121.37	195.33	315	Rocky Park Road	
Coconino		123.65	199.00	317	Fox Ranch Road	
Coconino		126.29	203.24	320	Schnebly Hill Road	
Coconino	Munds Park	128.51	206.82	322	Munds Park	
Coconino	Munds Park	129.04	207.67	Christensen Rest Areas		
Coconino		132.01	212.45	326	Willard Springs Road	
Coconino		134.55	216.54	328	Newman Park Road	
Coconino		136.90	220.32	331	Kelly Canyon Road	
Coconino	Kachina Village	139.65	224.74	333	Kachina Boulevard / Mountainaire Road	
Coconino	Flagstaff	143.17	230.41	337	SR 89A south (John Wesley Powell Boulevard) – Sedona, Flagstaff Pulliam Airport	Southern end of SR 89A concurrency
Coconino	Flagstaff	145.55	234.24	339	Lake Mary Road – Mormon Lake	Northbound exit only
Coconino	Flagstaff	145.76	234.58	340	I-40 – Los Angeles, Albuquerque SR 89A north – Flagstaff, Grand Canyon	Northern end of SR 89A concurrency; signed as exits 340A (east) and 340B (west); I-40 exit 195; freeway continues as SR 89A north (former SR 79)
1.000 mi = 1.609 km; 1.000 km = 0.621 mi: Closed/former; Concurrency terminus; Proposed; Incomplete access; Route transition

== Former business route ==
State Business Route 17
- Location: Black Canyon City
- Length: 3 mi (4.8 km)
- Existed: 2011

State Business Route 17 (also known as SR 17 Bus.) was a three-mile (4.8 km) business loop of I-17 that served the west side of Black Canyon City, Arizona. SR 17 Bus. followed Old Black Canyon Highway (formerly SR 69 before I-17 replaced most of the route between Phoenix and Cordes Junction) from exit 242 south of town at a diamond interchange to another diamond interchange at exit 244 north of town. The business route was subsequently transferred from state to local maintenance and because of ADOT's policy of not signing business loops on nonstate maintained roadways, the route was decommissioned in 2011.

Major intersections
The entire route was in Black Canyon City.

County	mi	km	Destinations	Notes
Maricopa–Yavapai county line	0.000	0.000	I-17 – Phoenix, Flagstaff	Southern terminus; I-17 exit 242
Yavapai	3.000	4.828	I-17 – Flagstaff, Phoenix	Northern terminus; I-17 exit 244
1.000 mi = 1.609 km; 1.000 km = 0.621 mi

== See also ==
- Roads and freeways in metropolitan Phoenix
- Interstate 19
