= Arizona State Route 69 =

State highway in Yavapai County, Arizona

State Route 69
- Black Canyon Highway
- SR 69 highlighted in red

Route information
- Maintained by ADOT
- Length: 33.87 mi (54.51 km)
- Existed: May 19, 1936–present

Major junctions
- South end: I-17 in Cordes Lakes
- SR 169 in Dewey-Humboldt
- North end: SR 89 in Prescott

Location
- Country: United States
- State: Arizona
- Counties: Yavapai

Highway system
- Arizona State Highway System; Interstate; US; State; Scenic Proposed; Former
← SR 68	→ SR 69T

State Route 69 (SR 69) is a highway that serves as the main road to Prescott, Arizona, from Interstate 17. The highway mainly consists of four-lanes (two per side), although some sections in Prescott and Prescott Valley are wider. Prior to the construction of Interstate 17 in the 1960s and early 1970s, State Route 69 continued south to Phoenix, Arizona, as the Prescott-Phoenix Hwy or Black Canyon Highway on a different alignment, through the ghost towns of Bumble Bee and Cordes.

== Route description ==
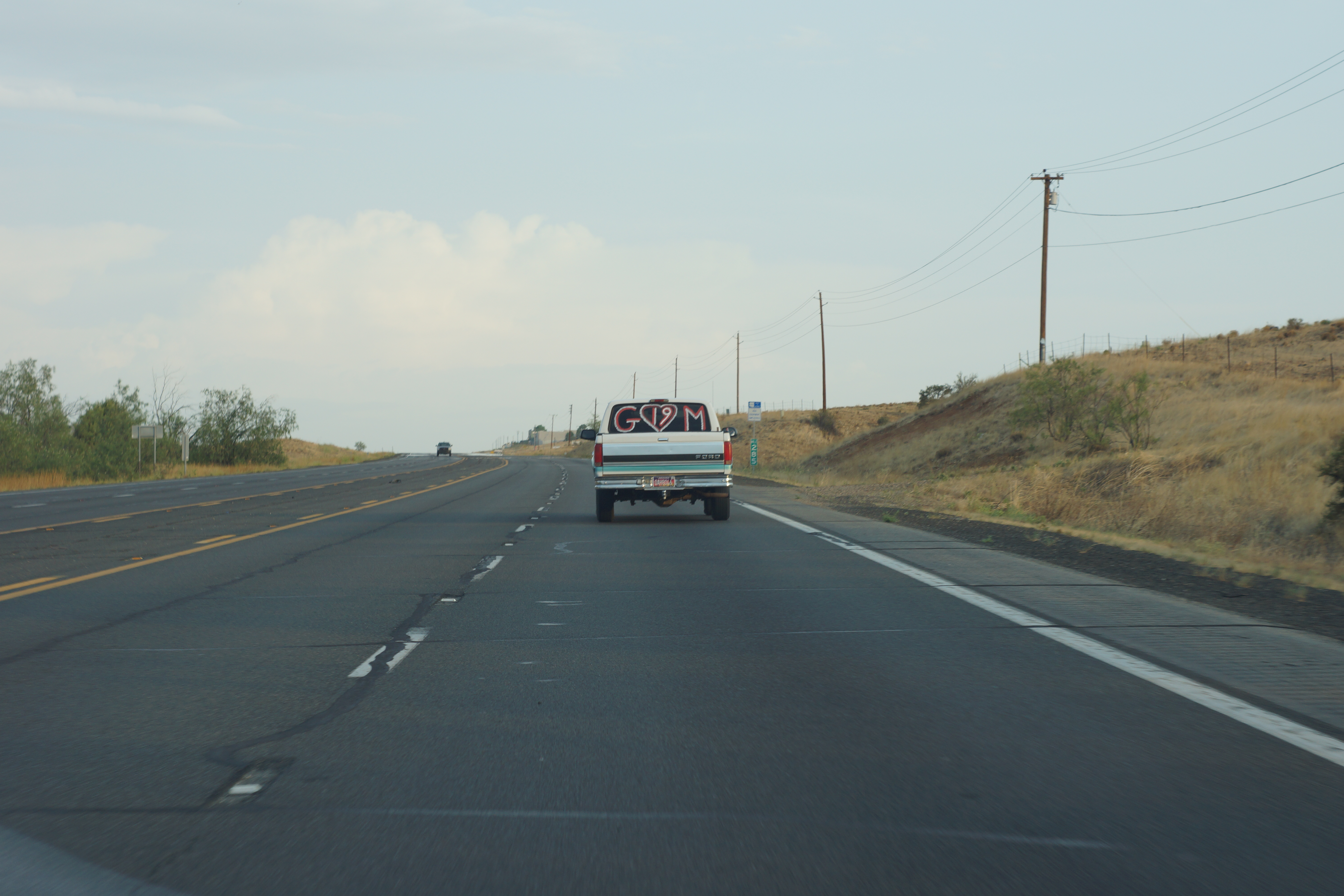
Arizona State Route 69

The southern terminus of SR 69 is located at exit 262 of I-17, at a spot known as Cordes Junction. It heads northwest from this interchange passing through Mayer before curving towards the north at Poland Junction. It continues north to a junction with SR 169 in Dewey-Humboldt. The highway gradually curves towards the west after this junction as it heads through Prescott Valley. It continues its gradual curve towards the southwest until it curves towards the west near Yavapai Hills. The highway continues towards the west until it reaches its terminus at SR 89 in Prescott.

== History ==
Original signage for SR 69.

SR 69 was first established as a state highway on May 19, 1936. The new route served as a shorter connection than the pre-existing US 89 from Phoenix to Prescott for northbound travelers. The original route taken by SR 69 reached Mayer from Black Canyon City, by way of Bumble Bee and Cordes. By 1951, a new paved alignment of SR 69 had been constructed between New River and Cordes, bypassing the original road through Bumble Bee. By 1958, SR 69 was re-routed on another new alignment through Cordes Junction, bypassing the remainder old route between New River and Mayer, through Cordes. Despite being bypassed by a newer alignment, the original route was still owned and maintained by the state until December 28, 1962. SR 69 was truncated from Phoenix to Cordes Junction in 1970, after Interstate 17 was completed.

== Junction list ==
The entire route is in Yavapai County.

Location	mi	km	Exit	Destinations	Notes
Cordes Lakes	0.00	0.00		I-17 south – Phoenix	Southern terminus; former SR 69 south
Cordes Lakes	0.90	1.45	263	Arcosanti Road to I-17 north – Flagstaff	Interchange; southbound exit and northbound entrance; I-17 north is former SR 79 north
Dewey-Humboldt	19.05	30.66		SR 169 north to I-17 – Camp Verde	
Prescott Valley	21.17	34.07		Fain Road (SR 89A Spur north) – Fairgrounds	SR 89A Spur (unsigned) continues 7.2 miles (11.6 km) north to meet SR 89A
Prescott	34.01	54.73		SR 89 north – Chino Valley, Ash Fork	Interchange; northbound exit only; former US 89
Prescott				Overland Road	Right-in/right-out interchange; southbound entrance only
Prescott				Gurley Street – Business District	Interchange; northbound left exit only
Prescott	34.12	54.91		SR 89 south (Sheldon Street)	Northern terminus; former US 89
1.000 mi = 1.609 km; 1.000 km = 0.621 mi: Incomplete access
