= The Stack =

Freeway interchange in Phoenix, Arizona

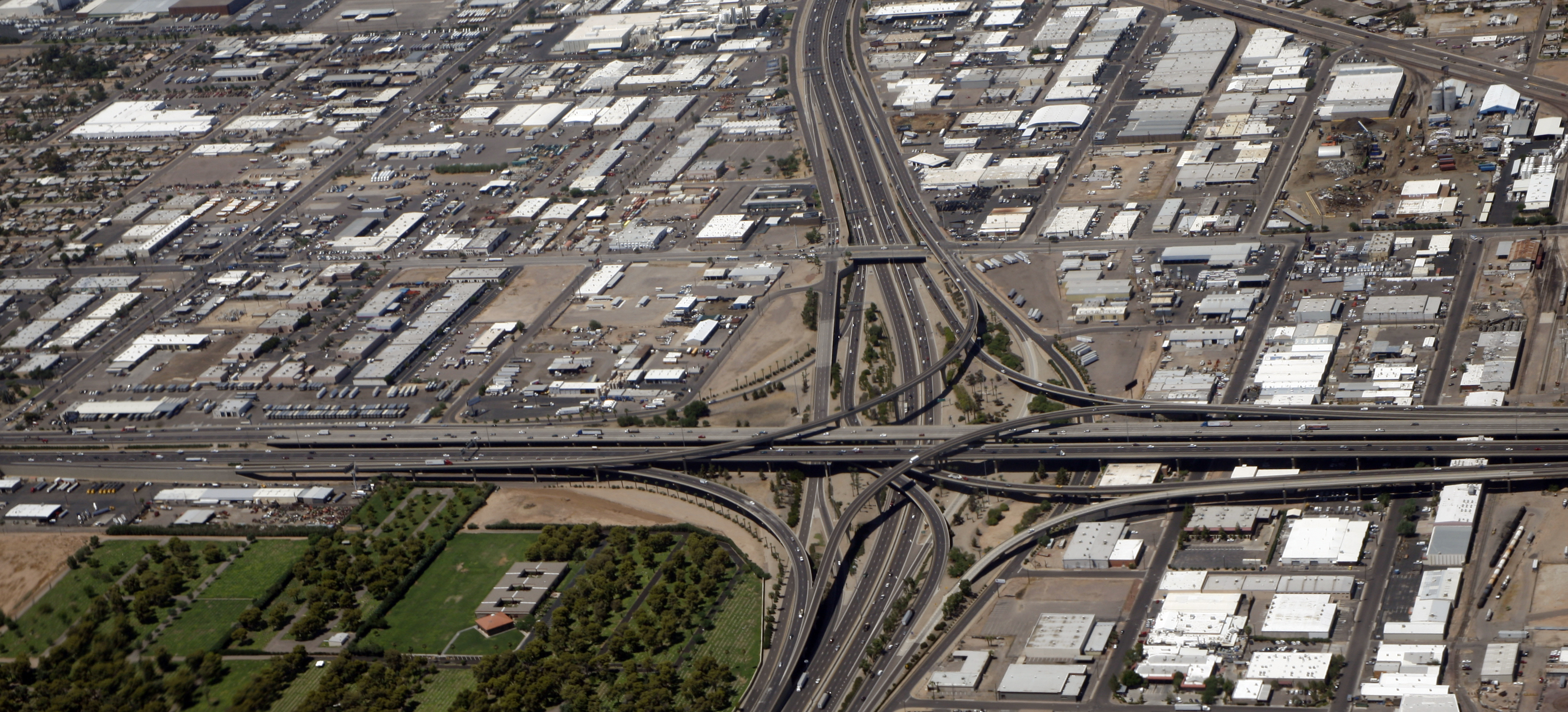
- "The Stack", intersection of Interstate 10 and I-17. Looking north up I-17, downtown Phoenix.

Location
- Phoenix, Arizona
- Coordinates: 33.462°N 112.108°W
- Roads at junction: I-10 (Papago Freeway); I-17 / US 60 (Black Canyon Freeway)

Construction
- Type: Stack interchange
- Opened: 1990
- Maintained by: ADOT

The Stack is a colloquialism used to describe the symmetrical, four-level stack interchange in Phoenix, Arizona that facilitates movements between Interstate 17/U.S. Route 60 and Interstate 10.

== Description ==
In 2006, the Stack interchange saw an average of 235,000 cars pass through it daily on Interstate 10 eastbound and westbound and an average of 120,000 cars on northbound and southbound Interstate 17. The interchange constitutes exit 200A on Interstate 17 and exits 143A and 143B on Interstate 10. Access is provided in all directions, and there are no direct HOV lane connections. Interstate 17 has two frontage roads running both southbound and northbound through the interchange known as Black Canyon Highway.

US 60 runs concurrently with I-17 throughout this interchange.

== History ==
The stack was the Phoenix Metropolitan Area and Arizona's first four-level stack interchange upon its completion in 1990 and one of the last portions of I-10 in Arizona to be completed.

== Congestion ==
In a 2007 study by Forbes, the Stack ranked number twelve in the United States in terms of delays with 16 million hours of delays each year. This is much better than the Mini Stack, which logged 22 million hours of delays, the fourth-worst in the nation.

== See also ==
- Metropolitan Phoenix freeways
- Mini Stack
- SuperRedTan Interchange
