= Lake Mary Road =

Local road in Arizona

- Lake Mary Road highlighted in red

Route information
- Maintained by Coconino County, City of Flagstaff
- Length: 53.7 mi (86.4 km)
- Component highways: CR 3

Major junctions
- South end: SR 87 near Clint’s Well
- I-17 / SR 89A in Flagstaff
- North end: Beulah Boulevard in Flagstaff

Location
- Country: United States
- State: Arizona
- Counties: Coconino

Highway system
- Coconino County Roads

Lake Mary Road is a north–south road in the U.S. state of Arizona. In 1967, the Arizona Department of Transportation added the road into the state highway system with the designation of State Route 487. However, by the late 1970s it had been returned to its original name, and no reason for its decommissioning is currently known. Today, the road traverses 53.7 miles (86.4 km) through Coconino County from State Route 87 (SR 87) east of Clint's Well to its northern terminus in Flagstaff. The section outside of Flagstaff is designated Coconino County Road 3 (CR 3).

== Route description ==
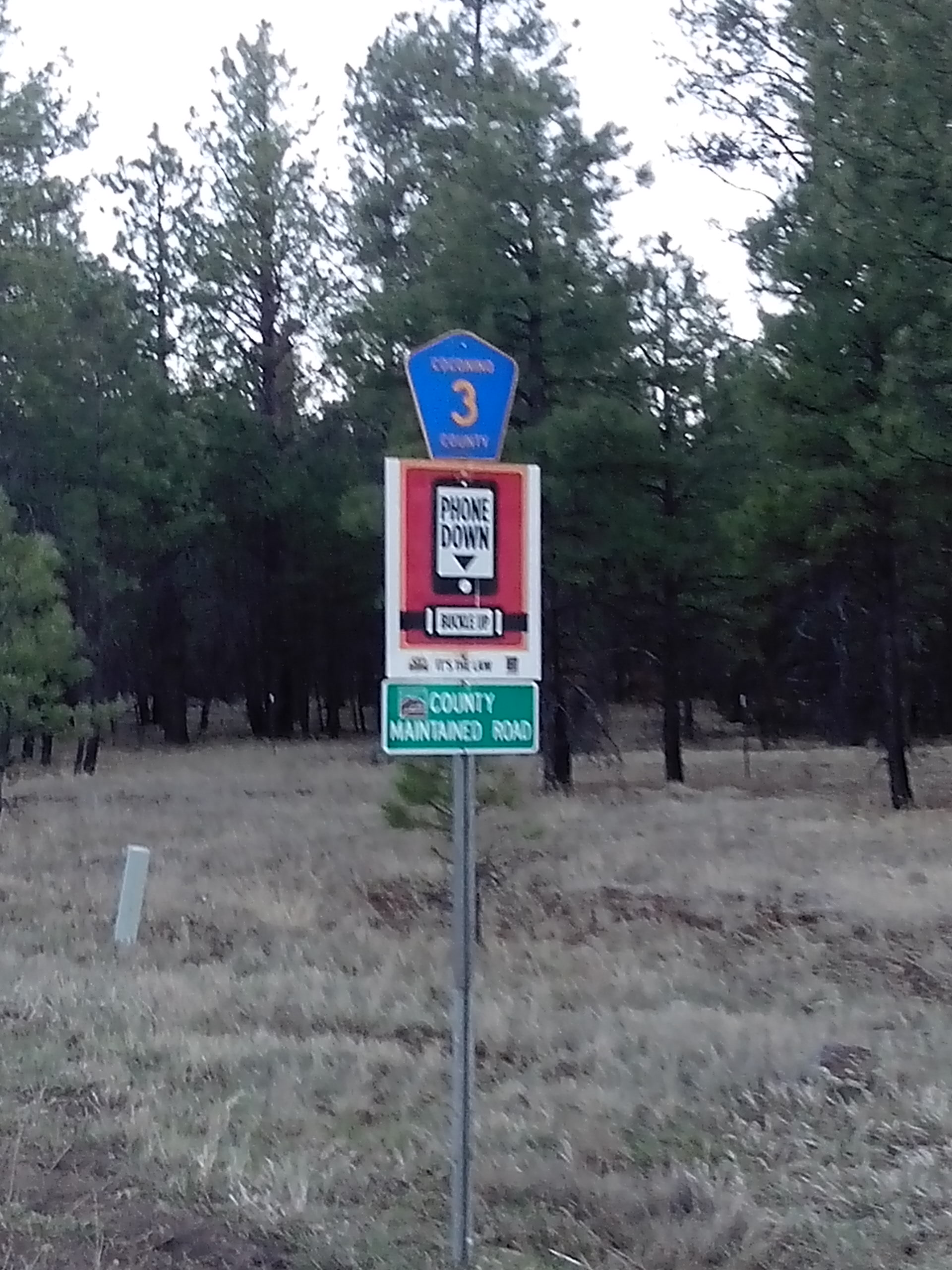
CR 3 marker on Lake Mary Road south of Flagstaff city limits

Lake Mary Road begins as CR 3. Its southern terminus is at an intersection with SR 87 in southern Coconino County, north of the Mogollon Rim. From there, Lake Mary Road (CR 3) heads north-northwest, traveling for 15.5 miles (24.9 km) before reaching the tiny community of Happy Jack. After that, the road curves north heading towards Mormon Lake, the largest natural lake in Arizona. During the winter months, the stretch of Lake Mary Road east of Mormon Lake is closed, and travelers using the road must take Mormon Lake Road around the west side of the lake before getting back onto Lake Mary Road. Roughly five miles (8.0 km) north of Mormon Lake, the road passes by Upper Lake Mary, at which point it heads west-northwest past Lower Lake Mary and towards Flagstaff. Upon reaching Flagstaff city limits, CR 3 ends and Lake Mary Road continues. The road reaches its northern end at Beulah Boulevard in Flagstaff, at the southwest corner of the Interstate 17/Interstate 40 (I-17/I-40) interchange.

Lake Mary Road, sometimes referred to as Forest Highway 3, is known for its recreational opportunities, as it runs through pine forest areas and past three northern Arizona lakes. It is also renowned for its gently rolling hills and wide roadway shoulders, making bicycling along the road attractive. The road has also become a destination for recreational runners, because the road has wide shoulders and easy access to trailheads and parking spots. The road maintains a minimum elevation of approximately 6,730 feet (2,050 m) above sea level for its entire length, while its peak elevation is over 7,500 feet (2,300 m) above sea level.

== Major intersections ==
The entire route is in Coconino County.

| Location | mi | km | Destinations | Notes |
|---|---|---|---|---|
| | 0.00 | 0.00 | SR 87 – Winslow, Payson CR 3 begins | Southern terminus of Lake Mary Road/CR 3 |
| | 27.1 | 43.6 | Mormon Lake Road (CR 90 north) | Counterclockwise terminus of CR 90 |
Stretch of road closed winters
| | 33.3 | 53.6 | Mormon Lake Road (CR 90 west) | Clockwise terminus of CR 90 |
| | 48.2 | 77.6 | CR 3 ends | Flagstaff city limits |
| Flagstaff | 53.5 | 86.1 | I-17 / SR 89A | No outbound access to freeway; inbound access from NB I-17 only; I-17 exit 339 |
| Flagstaff | 53.7 | 86.4 | Beulah Boulevard to Historic US 66 / I-17 (SR 89A) / I-40 – Flagstaff | Northern terminus of Lake Mary Road; Beulah Boulevard is former US 89A; road continues west as University Heights Drive North |
1.000 mi = 1.609 km; 1.000 km = 0.621 mi: Concurrency terminus; Incomplete access
