= Prescott Valley, Arizona =

Town in Yavapai County, Arizona

- Town
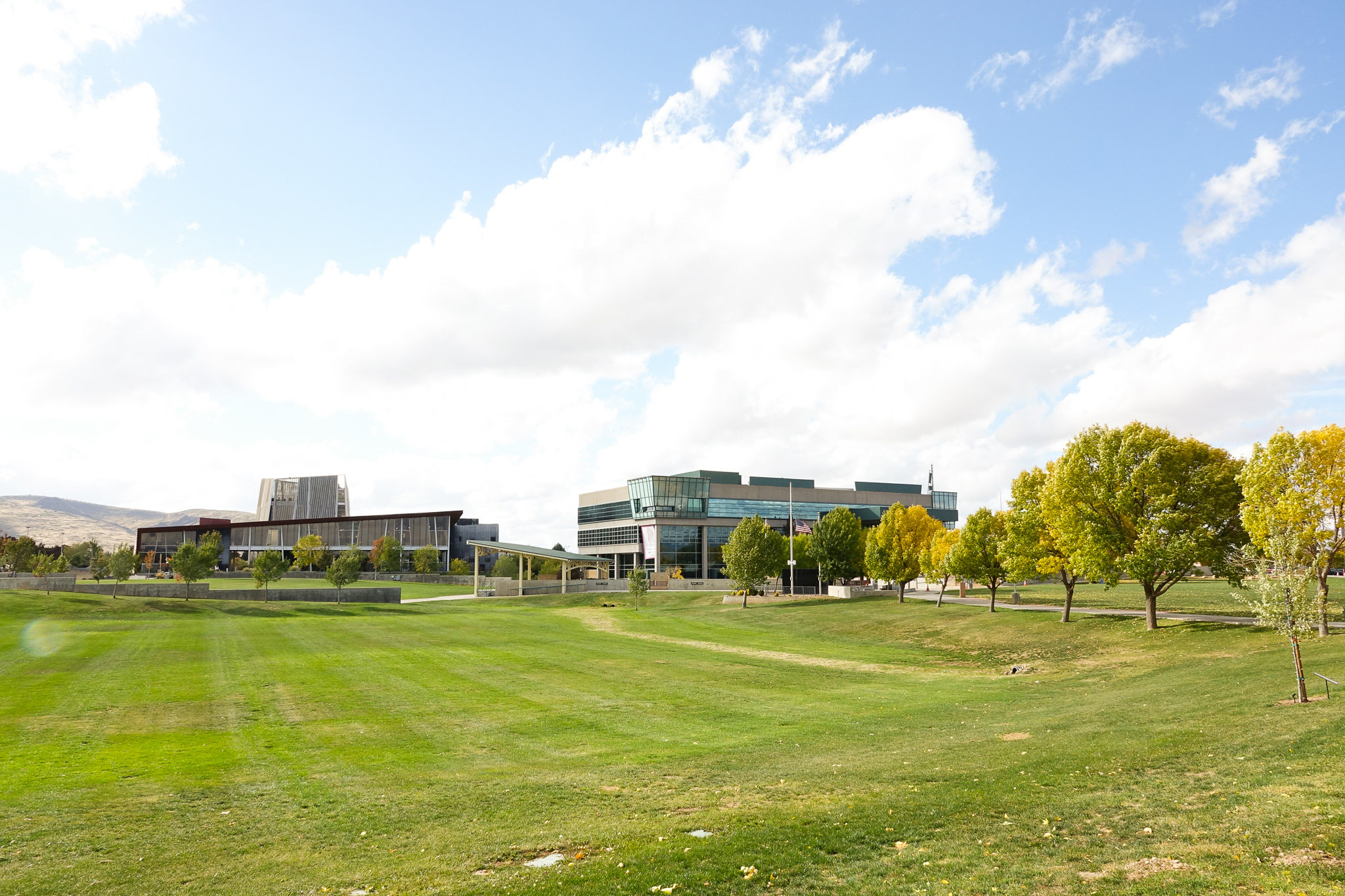
- Skyline view of Prescott Valley civic center

- Location of Prescott Valley in Yavapai County, Arizona

- Location in Arizona Prescott Valley (the United States)
- Coordinates: 34°35′50″N 112°19′07″W
- Country: United States
- State: Arizona
- County: Yavapai
- Incorporated (town): 1978

Area
  - Town: 40.46 sq mi (104.80 km^{2})
  - Land: 40.46 sq mi (104.80 km^{2})
  - Water: 0 sq mi (0.00 km^{2})
- Elevation: 5,063 ft (1,543 m)

Population (2020)
  - Town: 46,785
  - Density: 1,156/sq mi (446.4/km^{2})
  - Metro: 218,844 (US: 199th)
- Time zone: UTC-7 (MST)
- ZIP codes: 86312, 86314, 86315
- Area code: 928
- FIPS code: 04-57450
- GNIS feature ID: 2412507
- Website: http://www.prescottvalley-az.gov

Prescott Valley is a town located in Yavapai County, Arizona, United States, approximately 8 miles (13 km) east of Prescott. According to the 2020 United States census, Prescott Valley has a population of 46,785 residents.

== History ==
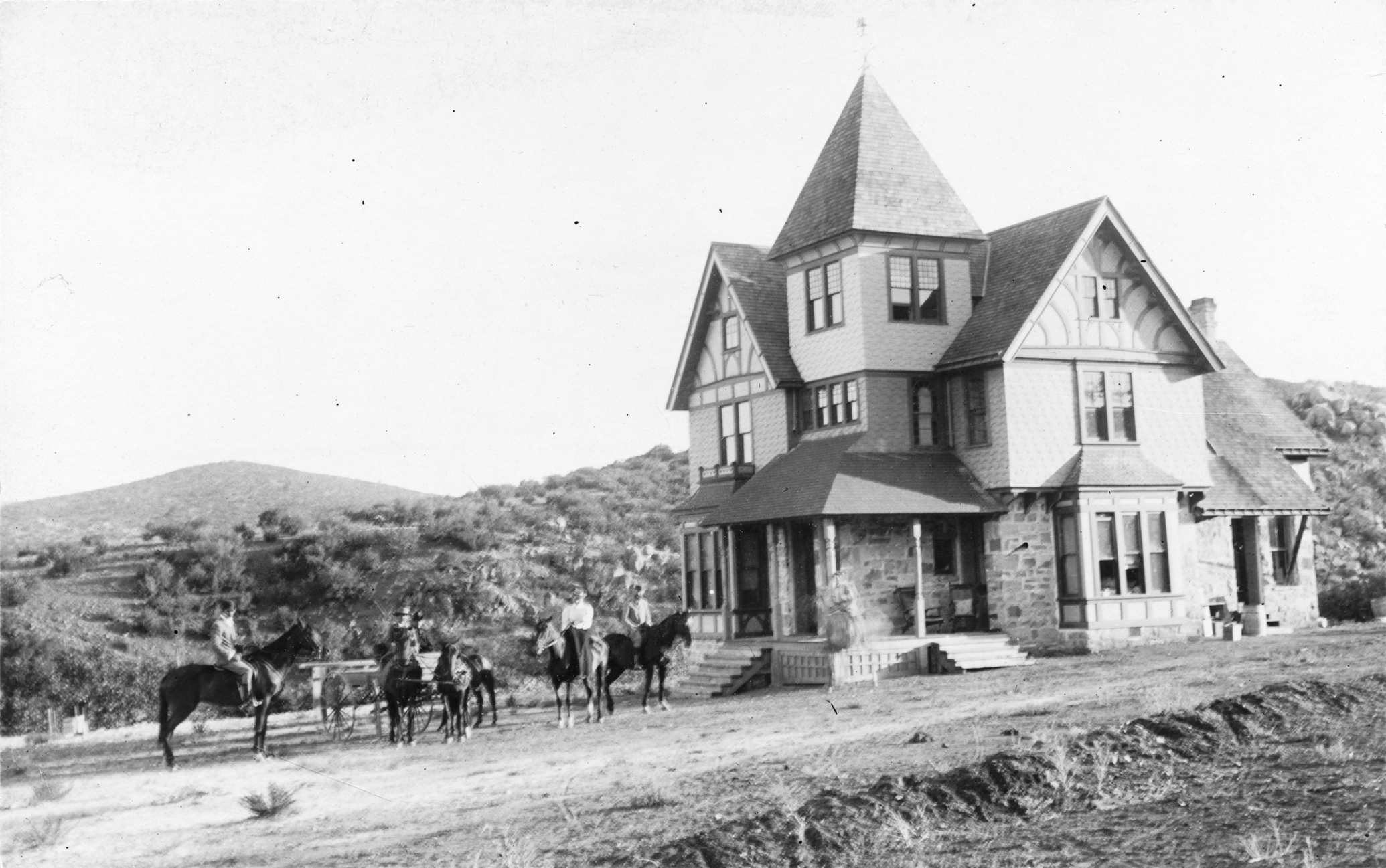
Barlow Massick's House

Prescott Valley's Fitzmaurice Ruins contain artifacts from the early Mountain Patayan people who inhabited the area some 1,400 years ago. The Walker Party discovered gold along Lynx Creek in 1863. The Lynx Creek placers went on to produce a recorded 29,000 troy ounces (900 kg) of gold. Estimates of actual production range up to 80,000 troy ounces (2,500 kg), which would be worth about $138 million at 2020 prices.

Prescott Valley, formerly known as Lonesome Valley, was settled by ranchers in the 1880s, raising beef to supply the miners and new settlers. The Fain family, pioneer ranchers, still ranch in the valley.

Thomas Gibson Barlow-Massicks arrived in the area in the early 1890s and built the historic "castle" that stood in Fain Park until a fire destroyed it in May 2026. Massicks had a hydraulic gold mining operation in Lynx Creek Canyon and built the company mining camp of Massicks, Arizona, just east of his Victorian home, the castle. The fireplace with chimney just inside the castle's fence is all that remains of the Massicks store. Massicks accidentally shot himself and died in April 1899 at the age of 37. In the 1930s, there was a gold dredging operation, the Doodle Bug Diggings, farther east in Lynx Creek Canyon.

In the mid-1960s, Prescott Valley Incorporated, a real-estate company from Phoenix, purchased land in an area 10 miles east of Prescott known as Lonesome Valley. In 1966, representatives from Prescott Valley Inc. began traveling to the Midwest to sell home lots. By 1978, more than 1,500 residents were living in the unincorporated area now known as Prescott Valley. In 1978, 80 percent of the voters of Prescott Valley voted for incorporation as a town. The town celebrated its 40th anniversary in 2018.

In 1985, Prescott Valley got its first licensed radio station. The station was the first solar powered FM station in the United States. Today, Arizona's Hometown Radio Group has grown to seven stations throughout Arizona.

== Geography ==
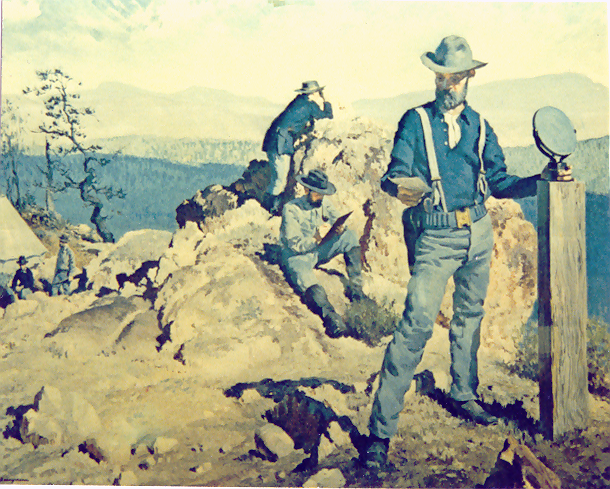
Heliograph signaling

Prescott Valley (locally, PV) is located in central Arizona approximately 85 miles (137 km) north of Phoenix at 5,100 feet (1,600 m). elevation. PV has good access to Arizona State Route 89, SR-89A and SR-69, connecting to Interstates 17 and 40. Air service is available at Ernest A. Love Field, approximately 8 miles (13 km) northwest.

One of PV's landmarks, Glassford Hill (elevation 6,177 feet (1,883 m)) was an active volcano between 10 and 14 million years ago. Colonel William A. Glassford traveled the area in the 1880s and helped build a system of 27 heliograph stations to monitor the movements of Apache Indians, U.S. military troops and civilians. Glassford Hill was a part of that early communications system.

=== Climate ===
According to the Köppen climate classification, Prescott Valley has a cold semi arid climate (abbreviated BSk).

Climate data for Prescott Valley, 1991–2020 simulated normals (5118 ft elevation)
Month	Jan	Feb	Mar	Apr	May	Jun	Jul	Aug	Sep	Oct	Nov	Dec	Year
Mean daily maximum °F (°C)	52.7 (11.5)	55.4 (13.0)	61.2 (16.2)	67.3 (19.6)	75.7 (24.3)	86.4 (30.2)	89.2 (31.8)	86.9 (30.5)	82.2 (27.9)	72.7 (22.6)	61.5 (16.4)	51.6 (10.9)	70.2 (21.2)
Daily mean °F (°C)	39.2 (4.0)	41.7 (5.4)	46.8 (8.2)	52.3 (11.3)	60.4 (15.8)	70.0 (21.1)	75.2 (24.0)	73.6 (23.1)	67.6 (19.8)	57.0 (13.9)	46.4 (8.0)	38.3 (3.5)	55.7 (13.2)
Mean daily minimum °F (°C)	25.7 (−3.5)	28.0 (−2.2)	32.4 (0.2)	37.6 (3.1)	45.1 (7.3)	53.8 (12.1)	61.3 (16.3)	60.3 (15.7)	52.9 (11.6)	41.4 (5.2)	31.3 (−0.4)	25.0 (−3.9)	41.2 (5.1)
Average precipitation inches (mm)	1.39 (35.31)	1.57 (39.95)	1.31 (33.30)	0.51 (12.98)	0.41 (10.37)	0.36 (9.12)	2.39 (60.80)	2.46 (62.59)	1.65 (41.99)	0.93 (23.64)	0.77 (19.57)	1.27 (32.16)	15.02 (381.78)
Average dew point °F (°C)	21.6 (−5.8)	22.5 (−5.3)	24.4 (−4.2)	24.4 (−4.2)	28.8 (−1.8)	31.5 (−0.3)	47.7 (8.7)	51.8 (11.0)	43.7 (6.5)	31.8 (−0.1)	24.3 (−4.3)	20.5 (−6.4)	31.1 (−0.5)
Source: Prism Climate Group

== Demographics ==
Historical population
Census	Pop.	Note	%±
1970	244		—
1980	2,284		836.1%
1990	8,858		287.8%
2000	23,535		165.7%
2010	38,822		65.0%
2020	46,785		20.5%
U.S. Decennial Census

=== Racial and ethnic composition ===
Prescott Valley town, Arizona – Racial and ethnic composition Note: the US Census treats Hispanic/Latino as an ethnic category. This table excludes Latinos from the racial categories and assigns them to a separate category. Hispanics/Latinos may be of any race.
Race / Ethnicity (NH = Non-Hispanic)	2020	2010	2000	1990	1980
White alone (NH)	73.6% (34,422)	78.8% (30,588)	85.5% (20,120)	92.6% (8,205)	97.2% (2,221)
Black alone (NH)	0.9% (404)	0.7% (278)	0.5% (107)	0.4% (39)	0.1% (2)
American Indian alone (NH)	0.9% (400)	0.9% (336)	0.8% (196)	0.7% (64)	0.6% (14)
Asian alone (NH)	1.5% (713)	1.1% (435)	0.5% (125)	0.4% (38)	
Pacific Islander alone (NH)	0.2% (71)	0.1% (46)	0.1% (34)		
Other race alone (NH)	0.4% (164)	0.1% (38)	0% (8)	0.1% (9)	
Multiracial (NH)	3.9% (1,835)	1.6% (617)	1.4% (328)	—	—
Hispanic/Latino (any race)	18.8% (8,776)	16.7% (6,484)	11.1% (2,617)	5.7% (503)	2.1% (47)

=== 2020 census ===
As of the 2020 census, Prescott Valley had a population of 46,785. The median age was 49.4 years. 18.9% of residents were under the age of 18 and 30.0% of residents were 65 years of age or older. For every 100 females there were 94.4 males, and for every 100 females age 18 and over there were 92.0 males age 18 and over.

91.0% of residents lived in urban areas, while 9.0% lived in rural areas.

There were 19,691 households in Prescott Valley, of which 23.6% had children under the age of 18 living in them. Of all households, 50.9% were married-couple households, 16.3% were households with a male householder and no spouse or partner present, and 25.6% were households with a female householder and no spouse or partner present. About 26.2% of all households were made up of individuals and 16.0% had someone living alone who was 65 years of age or older.

There were 21,276 housing units, of which 7.4% were vacant. The homeowner vacancy rate was 1.8% and the rental vacancy rate was 4.8%.

=== Income and poverty ===
The median income for a household in the town was $60,033 and the per capita income for the town was $30,686. About 11.6% of the population were below the poverty line.

== Economy ==
Prescott Valley's economy consists of industrial, manufacturing, retail and service businesses. Many retirees live there due to relatively inexpensive housing and the mild climate.

=== Top employers ===
According to the Prescott Valley Economic Development Foundation, the top employers in the town as of April 2022 are:

#	Employer	# of Employees
1	Yavapai Regional Medical Center - East Campus	756
2	Humboldt Unified School District	679
3	MI Windows and Doors	440
4	Ace Hardware Retail Support Distribution Center	418
5	Walmart	380
6	Town of Prescott Valley	273
7	Fry's Food Store	232
8	Mountain Valley Regional Rehabilitation Hospital	195
9	Home Depot	180
10	Safeway, Inc.	160
11	Superior Industries	150

== Culture ==
Prescott was the location of Arizona's first Elks Lodge (BPOE). In December 1895 a group of enterprising businessmen in Prescott, sturdy products of the early west, chartered the original petition for a dispensation and later established the Prescott Elks Lodge #330. "Mother Lodge of Arizona" The Prescott Elks Opera House was built by the lodge in 1905. The Prescott Elks Lodge is now located in Prescott Valley and has served the community for more than 116 years.

== Attractions ==
Prescott Valley is located within 10 minutes of the Prescott National Forest, with lakes, fishing, hiking and camping. The Entertainment District is located downtown and offers a variety of restaurants, a 6,000-seat events center, a multi-screen movie theater, and retail shops. There are 27 parks. Fain Park preserves remnants of early 20th century gold mining along Lynx Creek.

=== Sports ===
The Northern Arizona Suns, a minor league basketball team in the NBA G League, played in the Findlay Toyota Center from 2016 to 2020.

The Arizona Sundogs minor professional ice hockey team called Prescott Valley its home from 2006 to 2014. The team won the Central Hockey League championship in 2008.

The Arizona Adrenaline indoor football team also played two seasons in the Tim's Toyota Center (now the Findlay Toyota Center.) A new team, the Northern Arizona Wranglers of the Indoor Football League, began play in 2021 and won the league's National Championship in 2022.

Prescott Valley's Mountain Valley Splash is an outdoor community pool that seasonally offers children's swim lessons, water aerobics, school swim team practices, and recreational swim.

=== Parks and trails ===
Prescott Valley has over 300 acres of community parks and trails that are open to the public. Parks range from athletic fields to playgrounds, walking paths, and waterways. The trails offer a variety of terrain and views depending on time of year/seasons.

=== Fain Park ===
The Fain family, who were one of the original pioneer families to settle in Prescott Valley, donated the land in which Fain Park is located to the citizens of Prescott Valley. The Fain Lake is located within the park. Also located in the park is the Victorian British Manor known as “The Castle”. The structure was built in 1891, by English entrepreneur Thomas Gibson Barlow-Massicks. Barlow-Massicks established a gold mining operation and some of the equipment which he used is on display there. The Chapel of the Valley opened in 2002. The stained glass windows of the chapel, made in 1906 in Germany, once belonged to the Mercy Hospital which burned to the ground in 1940. Henry Lovell Brooks (1912–2006), an educator and organist for the First Congregational Church in Prescott, helped build the Chapel of the Valley and donated the windows and a 1877 Estey Reed Pipe Organ. Fain Park was listed in the National Register of Historic Places, as part of the Lynx Creek District, on August 31, 1978, reference # 78000571. Fain Park is located at south of Arizona State Route 69 and east of Stoneridge Drive.

== Transportation ==
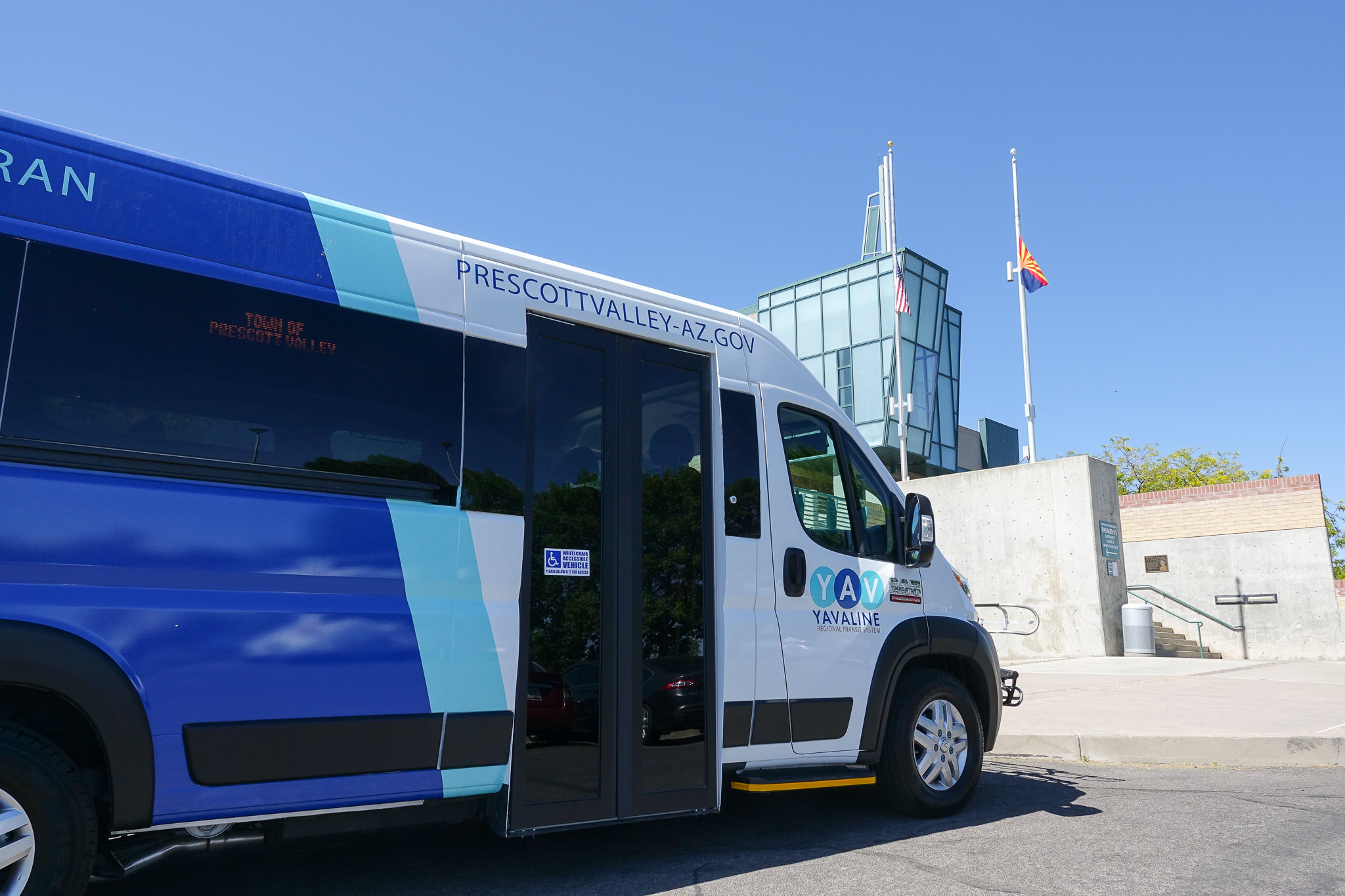
Yavaline bus in front of Prescott Valley civic center

There are three main thoroughfares in and around Prescott Valley which include Arizona State Route 89A, Arizona State Route 69 and Fain Road. Arizona State Route 89A is a four lane divided highway that connects Prescott Valley to northern Prescott and Ernest A. Love Field Airport to the west and to the east Jerome, Cottonwood and Sedona. Arizona State Route 69 is a six lane roadway that connects Prescott Valley to downtown Prescott and Interstate 17. Fain Road is a four lane limited access freeway that links Arizona State Route 89A and Arizona State Route 69 in the east. In 2006 the town of Prescott Valley proposed the Great western Corridor from Arizona State Route 89A to Outer Loop road in Chino Valley, Arizona.

Created in 2022, the YavaLine Regional Transit System (“YAV”) is the first-ever transit service in the Prescott Valley area. The YAV is starting with a shared ride, on-demand service.

== Notable people ==
- Sharlot Hall's family had a ranch between present-day Prescott Valley and Dewey. She lived there from 1890 to about 1925.
