= Canon Elementary School District =

School district in Arizona, United States

Address
- 34630 South School Loop Road Black Canyon City, Arizona, 85324; United States

District information
- Type: Public
- Grades: PreK–8
- NCES District ID: 0401650

Students and staff
- Students: 129
- Teachers: 12.0
- Staff: 16.5
- Student–teacher ratio: 10.75

Other information
- Website: www.canon50.org

Cañon Elementary School District 50 is a school district in Black Canyon City, Yavapai County, Arizona. It operates a single K-8 school, Cañon Elementary School.

The district includes most of Black Canyon City census-designated place. It also includes Bumble Bee.

Its area is 170 square miles (440 km^{2}).

== History ==
The school district's history started circa 1898.

Beginning in 1974 and through 1976 there was a political conflict over allegations of moving mail to the wrong place and antagonizing a faculty member, targeting the board of education's clerk, who stated that the accusations had no merit. This spilled into a conflict between factions of board members. The conflict continued into 1978, and the accused board member expressed hope that after an election, the conflicts would subside.

As of 1984 the district sends high school students and junior high level special education students to the Deer Valley Unified School District (DVUSD). In 1984, 27 students from Cañon attended DVUSD. That year Deer Valley sued Cañon, which stated it was unable to pay for the tuition costs of the district and acknowledged that it was billed for the correct amount. The Arizona Republic described this as a "friendly lawsuit", since according to the DVUSD officials, Cañon district officials stated that the lawsuit was the only mechanism through which it could pay DVUSD.

In 2006 enrollment was under 300. That year, there was a proposal for a referendum on whether the Canon school district should consolidate with the DVUSD, or with the Mayer Unified School District, or to do nothing.
