= Cordes Lakes, Arizona =

CDP in Yavapai County, Arizona

- CDP
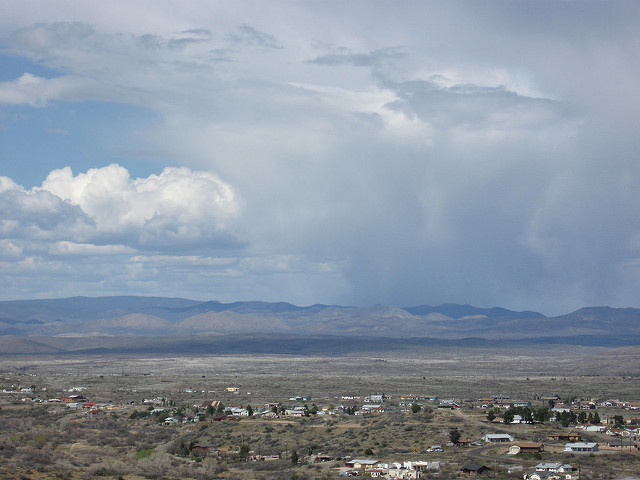

- Location in Yavapai County and the state of Arizona

- Location in the United States
- Coordinates: 34°18′46″N 112°07′12″W
- Country: United States
- State: Arizona
- County: Yavapai

Area
  - Total: 10.83 sq mi (28.04 km^{2})
  - Land: 10.83 sq mi (28.04 km^{2})
  - Water: 0 sq mi (0.00 km^{2})
- Elevation: 3,714 ft (1,132 m)

Population (2020)
  - Total: 2,684
  - Density: 247.9/sq mi (95.73/km^{2})
- Time zone: UTC-7 (MST)
- ZIP code: 86333
- Area code: 928
- FIPS code: 04-15765
- GNIS feature ID: 2407661

Cordes Lakes is a census-designated place (CDP) in Yavapai County, Arizona, United States. The population was 2,058 at the 2000 census. The Agua Fria National Monument lies to the east and south of the community and Arcosanti is to the north.

Cordes Junction, at the intersection of Arizona State Route 69 and I-17, is located within the CDP of Cordes Lakes.

== Geography ==
According to the United States Census Bureau, the CDP has a total area of 10.9 square miles (28 km^{2}), all land.

Lying in the foothills of Prescott Valley, Cordes Lakes has common terrain of a middle latitude desert, including but not limited to tall long stretching hills, mesas, several species of cacti, and large rock formations.

The Cordes Lakes' back roads lead straight to the Agua Fria National Monument.

== Demographics ==
Historical population
Census	Pop.	Note	%±
2020	2,684		—
U.S. Decennial Census

=== 2020 census ===
As of the 2020 census, Cordes Lakes had a population of 2,684. The median age was 54.6 years. 17.0% of residents were under the age of 18 and 31.5% were 65 years of age or older. For every 100 females, there were 109.0 males, and for every 100 females age 18 and over, there were 107.7 males age 18 and over.

0.0% of residents lived in urban areas, while 100.0% lived in rural areas.

There were 1,207 households in Cordes Lakes, of which 17.0% had children under the age of 18 living in them. Of all households, 40.3% were married-couple households, 27.2% were households with a male householder and no spouse or partner present, and 23.6% were households with a female householder and no spouse or partner present. About 34.8% of all households were made up of individuals, and 20.9% had someone living alone who was 65 years of age or older.

There were 1,431 housing units, of which 15.7% were vacant. The homeowner vacancy rate was 3.5%, and the rental vacancy rate was 16.5%.

Racial composition as of the 2020 census
Race	Number	Percent
White	2,299	85.7%
Black or African American	18	0.7%
American Indian and Alaska Native	21	0.8%
Asian	19	0.7%
Native Hawaiian and Other Pacific Islander	7	0.3%
Some other race	124	4.6%
Two or more races	196	7.3%
Hispanic or Latino (of any race)	302	11.3%

=== 2000 census ===
As of the census of 2000, there were 2,058 people, 866 households, and 582 families residing in the CDP. The population density was 189.2 inhabitants per square mile (73.1/km^{2}). There were 1,079 housing units at an average density of 99.2 per square mile (38.3/km^{2}). The racial makeup of the CDP was 97.0% White, 0.2% Black or African American, 0.9% Native American, 0.2% Asian, 0.2% Pacific Islander, 0.7% from other races, and 1.4% from two or more races. 6.2% of the population were Hispanic or Latino of any race.

There were 866 households, out of which 19.9% had children under the age of 18 living with them, 55.0% were married couples living together, 7.9% had a female householder with no husband present, and 32.7% were non-families. 26.6% of all households were made up of individuals, and 13.2% had someone living alone who was 65 years of age or older. The average household size was 2.33 and the average family size was 2.77.

In the CDP, the population was spread out, with 21.2% under the age of 18, 4.9% from 18 to 24, 21.7% from 25 to 44, 27.1% from 45 to 64, and 25.1% who were 65 years of age or older. The median age was 47 years. For every 100 females, there were 103.8 males. For every 100 females age 18 and over, there were 103.6 males.

The median income for a household in the CDP was $29,097, and the median income for a family was $32,300. Males had a median income of $27,692 versus $16,250 for females. The per capita income for the CDP was $13,720. About 12.6% of families and 17.7% of the population were below the poverty line, including 37.2% of those under age 18 and 7.1% of those age 65 or over.

== Education ==
Residents are in the Mayer Unified School District.

== See also ==
- Census-designated places in Arizona
