= Bumble Bee, Arizona =

Ghost town in Yavapai County, Arizona

- Ghost town
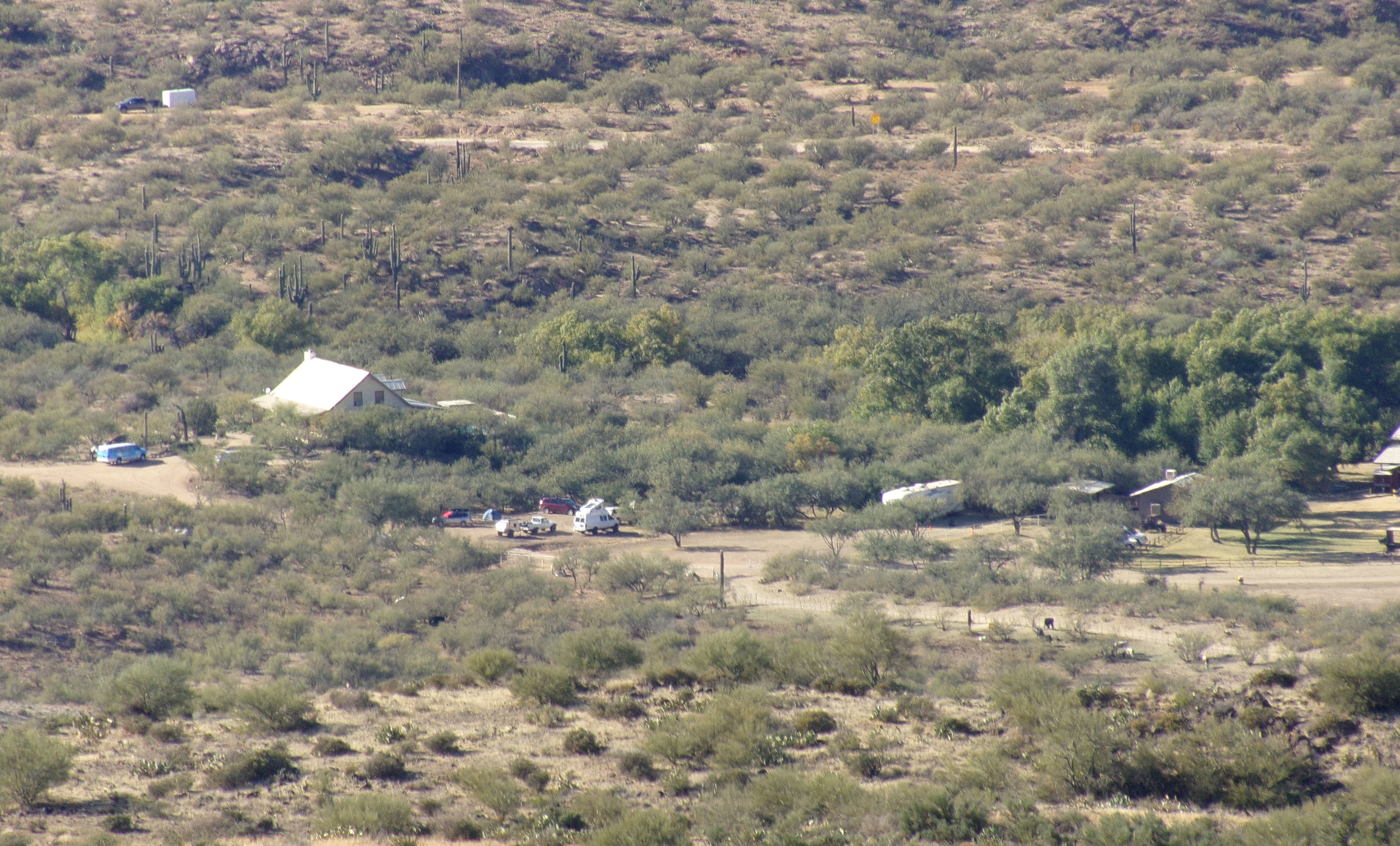
- Bumble Bee townsite, 2017. Bumble Bee Creek is above the house.

- Location within the state of Arizona Bumble Bee, Arizona (the United States)
- Coordinates: 34°12′03″N 112°09′11″W
- Country: United States
- State: Arizona
- County: Yavapai
- Elevation: 2,579 ft (786 m)
- Time zone: UTC-7 (Mountain (MST))
- GNIS feature ID: 27000

Bumble Bee is a ghost town in the Bradshaw Mountains of Yavapai County, Arizona, United States, named for nearby Bumble Bee Creek. The townsite area is commonly used by RV campers in winter.

== History ==
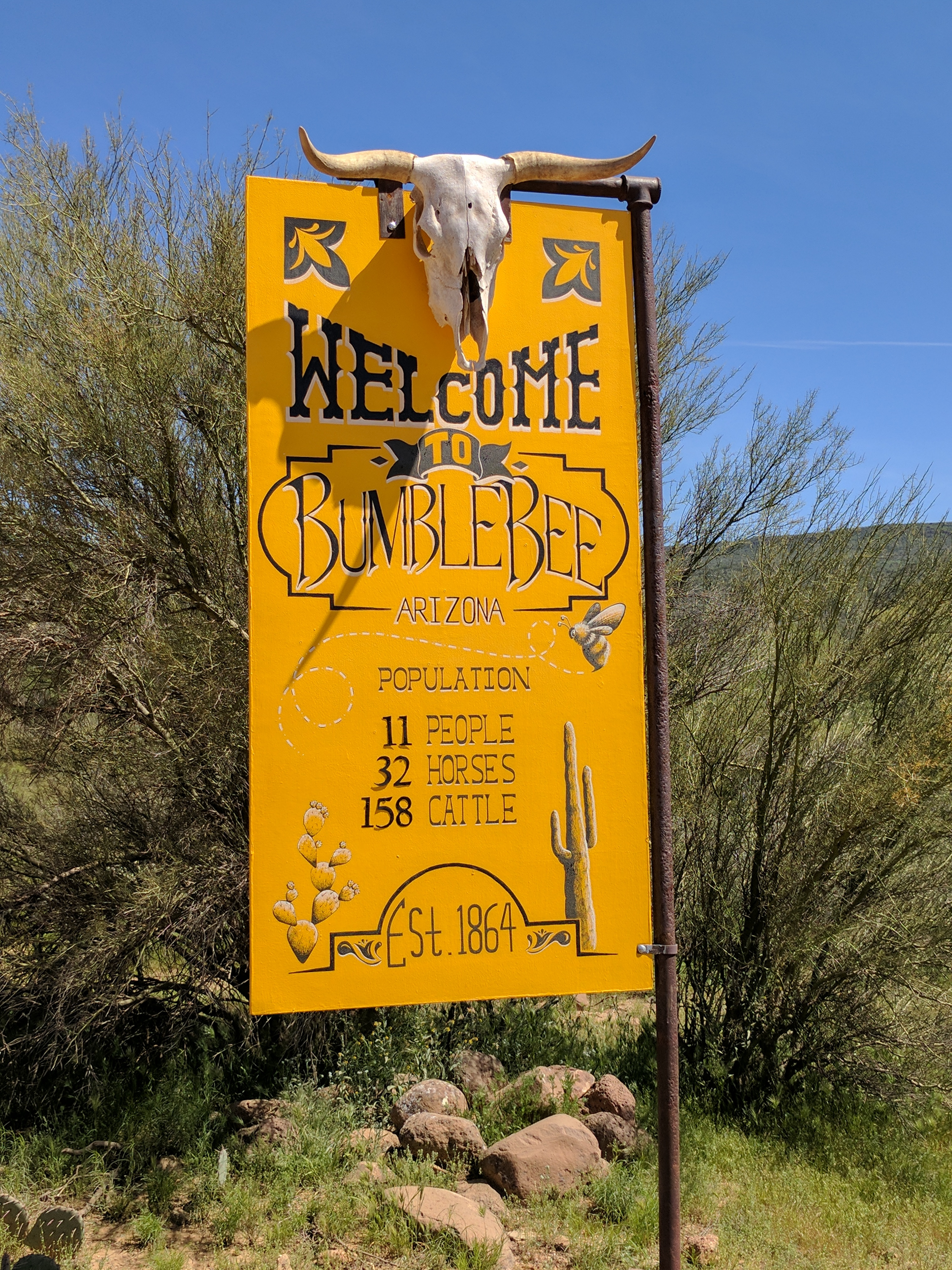
Road sign along Bumble Bee Road, 2017

Established in 1863, Bumble Bee served as a stagecoach stop and an outpost for the U.S. Cavalry, with a post office established in 1879. The creek, and by extension the town, were so named because early travelers in the area claimed that the indigenous people there were as "thick as bumblebees".

Bumble Bee's population was 25 in 1920, and 20 in 1940.

=== Ghost town status ===
With the demise of the stagecoach and the mining in the surrounding area, the site eventually faded away. An attempt by Jeff Martin to make the town a tourist attraction during the mid-1930s resulted in the construction of the current buildings. In 1960, Charles A. Penn, the retired publisher of Railroad Model Craftsman magazine, purchased the site and tried once again to establish a tourist attraction and museum. Penn died before his plans came to fruition and the property reverted to private ownership. Many of the faux historic buildings have since been torn down and smaller homes have been built in their place.

Bumble Bee is located 55 miles north of Phoenix, just off I-17 at Exit #248.

== Education ==
Bumble Bee is in the Canon Elementary School District.
