= Flagstaff Pulliam Airport =

Airport in Coconino County, Arizona

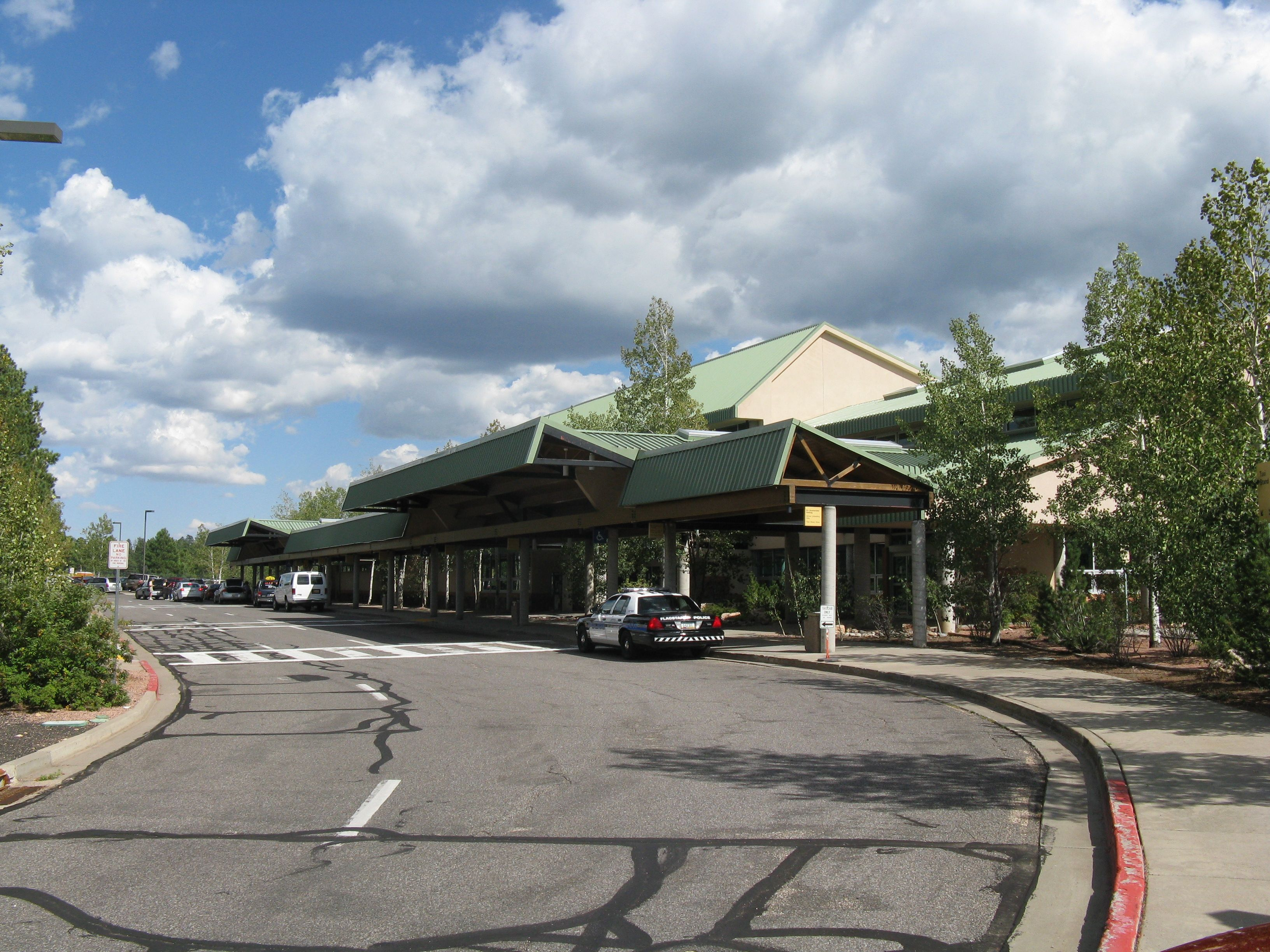
- Passenger terminal
- IATA: FLG; ICAO: KFLG; FAA LID: FLG

Summary
- Airport type: Public
- Owner/Operator: City of Flagstaff
- Serves: Flagstaff, Arizona
- Elevation AMSL: 7,014 ft (2,138 m)
- Coordinates: 35°08′16″N 111°40′28″W
- Website: flyflagstaffaz.com

Maps
- FAA airport diagram as of January 2021
- Location within Arizona Location within the United States

Runways
| Direction | Length | | Surface |
| Direction | ft | m | Surface |
|---|---|---|---|
| 3/21 | 8,800 | 2,682 | Asphalt |

Statistics (2022)
- Aircraft operations: 39,851
- Based aircraft: 112
- Source: Federal Aviation Administration

Flagstaff Pulliam Airport (IATA: FLG, ICAO: KFLG, FAA LID: FLG) is 5 miles (4.3 nmi; 8.0 km) south of Flagstaff, in Coconino County, Arizona, United States. The airport is serviced by American Eagle, and is also used for general aviation. The National Plan of Integrated Airport Systems for 2011–2015 called it a "primary commercial service" airport (more than 10,000 enplanements per year). It is the closest airport to Grand Canyon National Park with scheduled passenger service from a major airline or a major airline's affiliate.

== Facilities ==
The airport was built in 1948, and named after Clarence T. Maggie Pulliam, a former Flagstaff city manager who worked for the city for 44 years.

The airport covers 763 acres (309 ha) at an elevation of 7,014 ft (2,138 m). Its one runway, 3/21, has an asphalt surface and is 8,800 feet (2,700 m) in length and 150 feet (46 m) in width.

In the year ending December 31, 2024, the airport had 39,791 aircraft operations, an average of 109 per day: 40% general aviation, 28% air taxi, 22% local general aviation, 8% military, and 1% airline.

== Airlines and destinations ==
=== Passenger ===
| Airlines | Destinations |
|---|---|
| American Airlines | Seasonal: Dallas/Fort Worth |
| American Eagle | Dallas/Fort Worth, Phoenix–Sky Harbor |
| Delta Connection | Salt Lake City (begins June 7, 2027) |
| United Express | Denver (resumes August 10, 2027) |

=== Top domestic destinations ===
Top domestic destinations from FLG (August 2024 – July 2025)
| Rank | Airport | Passengers | Airline |
|---|---|---|---|
| 1 | Phoenix, Arizona | 54,930 | American Eagle |
| 2 | Dallas/Fort Worth, Texas | 25,410 | American Eagle |

== History ==
Commercial air service to Flagstaff began in the late 1940s with Arizona Airways, which merged into Frontier Airlines in 1950. Frontier operated Douglas DC-3, Convair 340, and Convair 580 aircraft with service to Phoenix and direct, no-change-of-plane flights to Denver via Gallup, Farmington, and Durango. The airline ceased operations at Flagstaff in 1979.

Throughout the 1970s and 1980s, several commuter airlines provided service, primarily to Phoenix. These included Cochise Airlines, Desert Air Service, Desert Pacific Airlines, SunWest Airlines, and SkyWest Airlines, operating various commuter aircraft such as the Fairchild Swearingen Metroliner, Beechcraft C99, and de Havilland Canada DHC-6 Twin Otter. SunWest also served Albuquerque via Gallup. SkyWest began service in the late 1970s and later flew as **Western Express** for Western Airlines, then as Delta Connection following Western’s merger with Delta Air Lines in 1987. SkyWest flights to Phoenix and Las Vegas continued through 1994. American Eagle, operated by Wings West Airlines, briefly served Flagstaff from 1986 to 1987.

America West Airlines launched service in 1987 with de Havilland Dash 8 flights to Phoenix and Las Vegas. Service later transitioned to Mesa Airlines operating as America West Express with Beechcraft 1900D and Embraer EMB-120 Brasilia aircraft. Flights increased to up to 16 daily departures by 1996. After mergers, this service became US Airways Express, and in 2012, regional jet service was introduced with Canadair CRJ-200s. Following the 2015 merger of US Airways with American Airlines, American Eagle resumed operations, and service was upgraded to Canadair CRJ-700 jets in 2017. A seasonal Saturday-only flight to Los Angeles operated briefly in summer 2018.

From 2008 to 2010, Horizon Air, on behalf of Alaska Airlines, operated Bombardier Q400 turboprops to Los Angeles, some stopping in Prescott, Arizona. The Q400 is the largest and fastest variant of the DHC-8 family.

SkyWest Airlines operating as American Eagle continues to operate scheduled passenger flights serving the airport with Canadair CRJ-700 regional jets to the American Airlines hub at Phoenix Sky Harbor International Airport and added new flights to Dallas Fort Worth International Airport on April 2, 2019. American Eagle also operated a seasonal service between Los Angeles (LAX) and Flagstaff beginning in October 2024, but did not renew the seasonal service for 2025.

Trans States Airlines, operating as United Express via a code sharing agreement with United Airlines, began flights on March 31, 2019 from Flagstaff to the United Airlines hub at Denver International Airport. Twice daily round-trip flights were initially being flown with Embraer ERJ-145 regional jet aircraft. Trans States was shut down in 2020 and CommutAir provided United Express service between the airport and Denver using Embraer ERJ-145 regional jets through October 2022.

=== Accidents at or near FLG ===
On January 11, 1995, an Empire Airlines Cessna 208 Caravan crashed 2 km (1.3 miles) SSE of FLG due to incorrectly configuring the aircraft fuel system prior to takeoff and impacting trees attempting to return to the airport. The sole occupant, the pilot, was killed.

== See also ==
- List of airports in Arizona
