= Mogollon Rim =

Escarpment of the Colorado Plateau in Arizona, US

Coordinates: 34°20′12″N 110°56′14″W

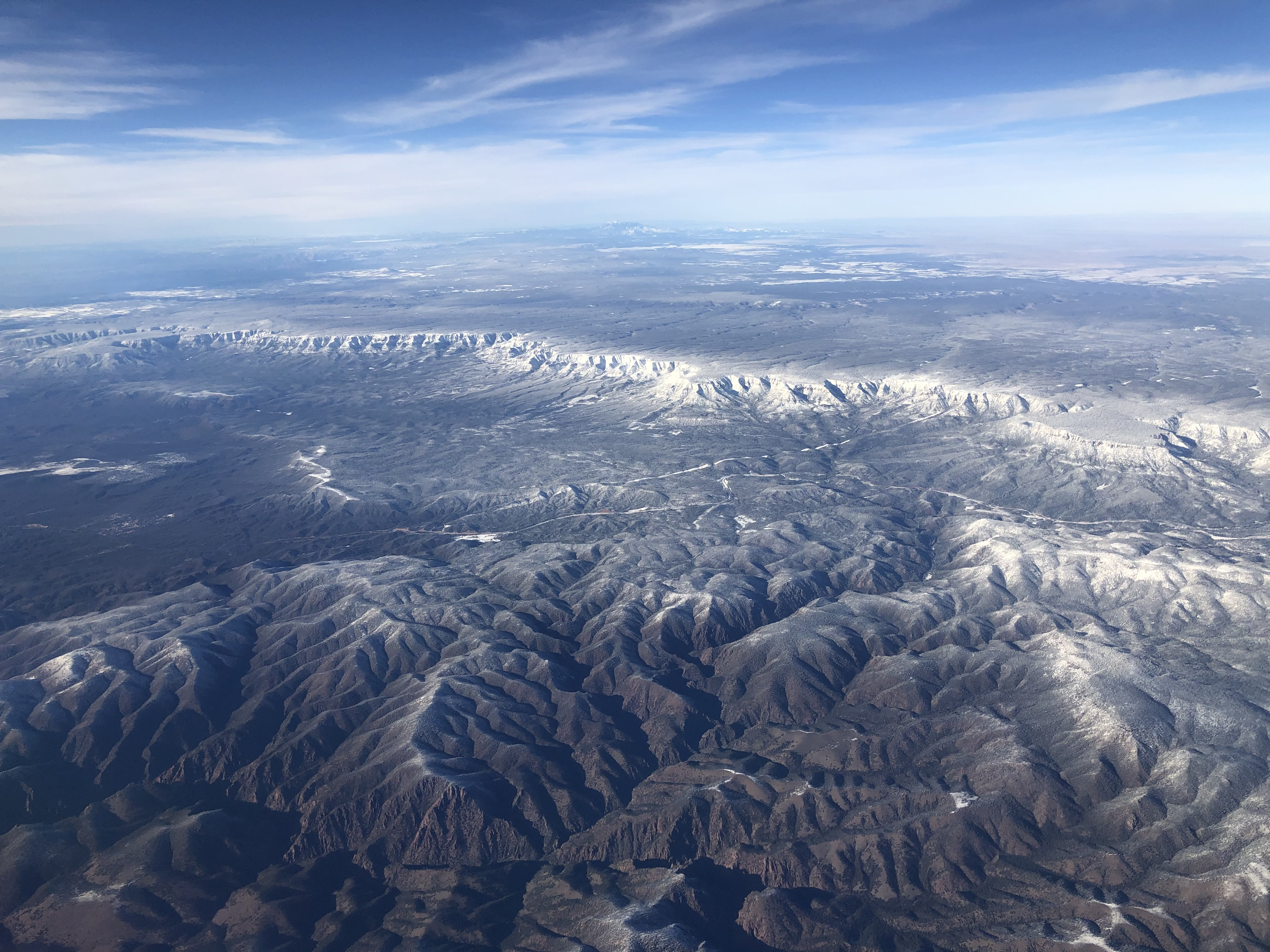
The Mogollon Rim northeast of Payson

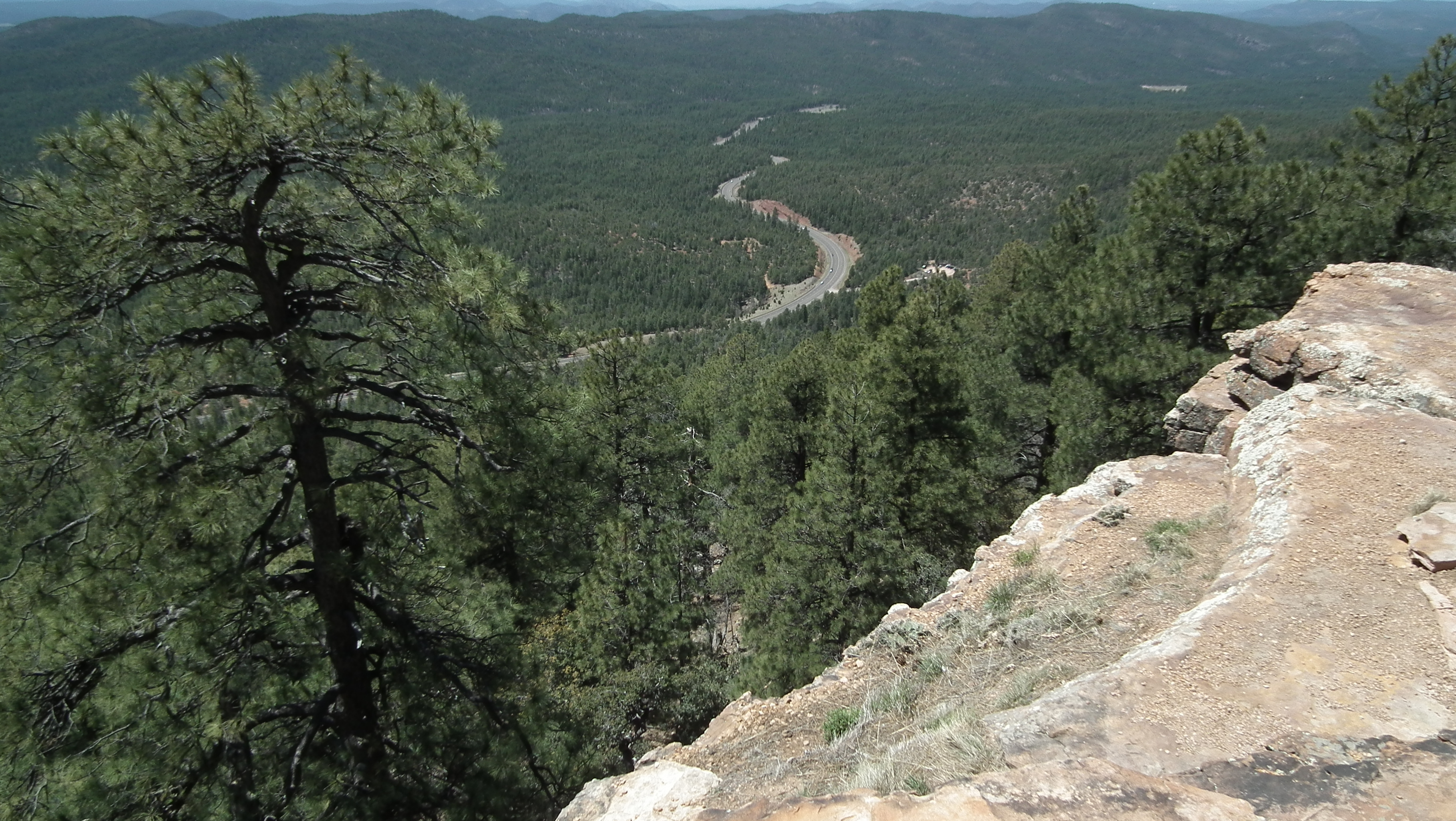
View from the east Rim

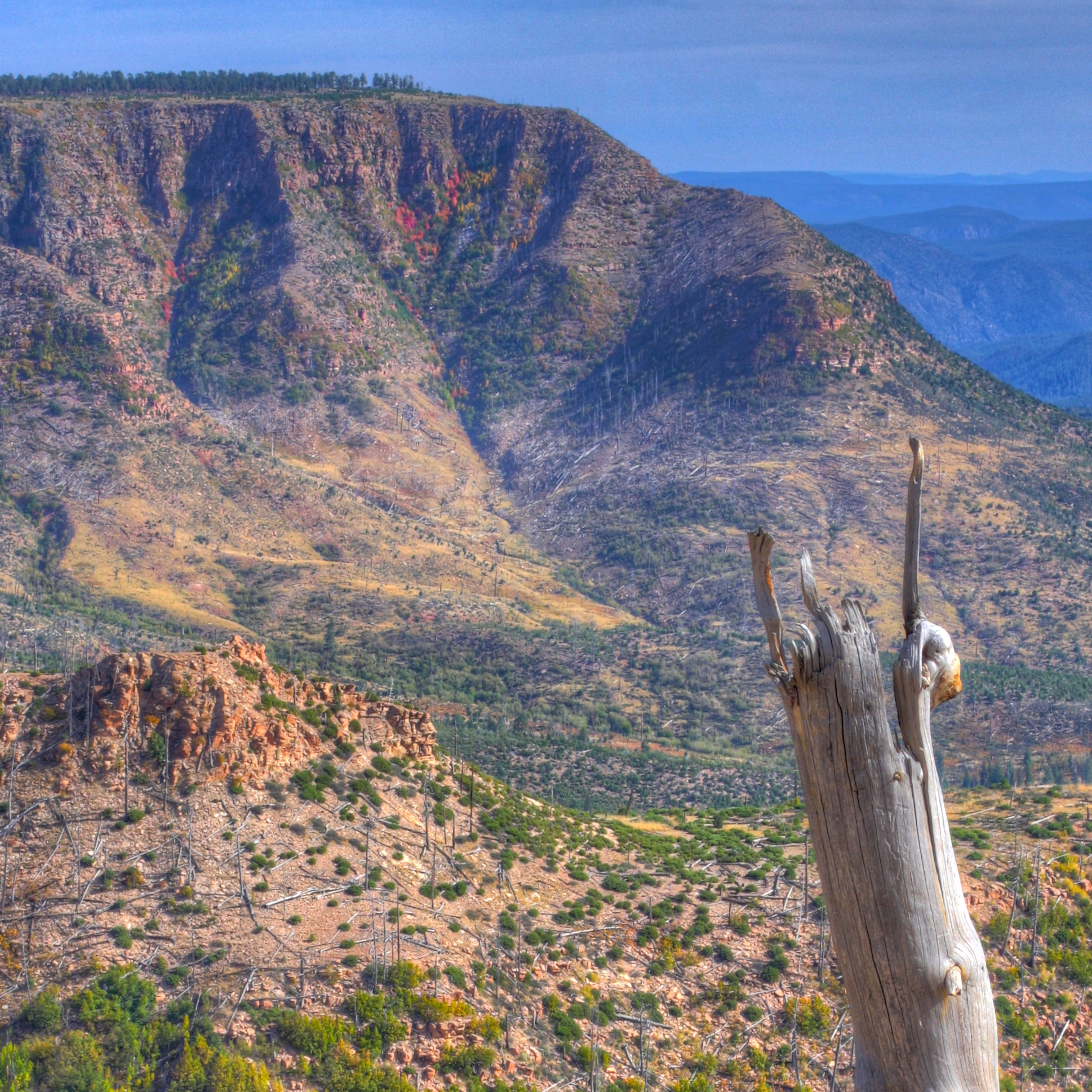
View of Mogollon Rim, east of Pine

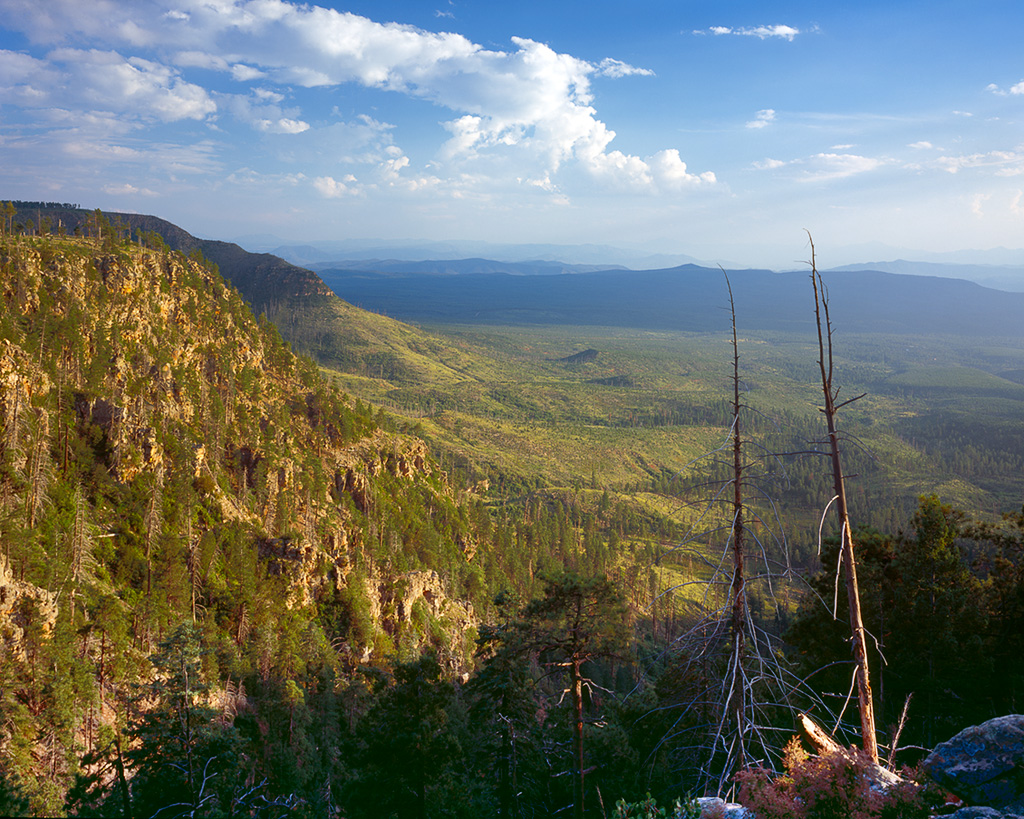
View from Mogollon Rim near Payson

The Mogollon Rim (/moʊɡəˈjoʊn/) is a topographical and geological feature cutting across the northern half of the U.S. state of Arizona. It extends approximately 200 miles (320 km), starting in northern Yavapai County and running eastward, ending near the border with New Mexico. It forms the southern edge of the Colorado Plateau in Arizona.

== Description ==
The Rim is an escarpment defining the southwestern edge of the Colorado Plateau. Its central and most spectacular portions are characterized by high cliffs of limestone and sandstone, namely the Kaibab Limestone and Coconino Sandstone cliffs. The escarpment was created by erosion and faulting, creating canyons such as Fossil Creek Canyon and Pine Canyon. The name Mogollon comes from Don Juan Ignacio Flores Mogollón, the Spanish Governor of New Mexico from 1712 to 1715.

Much of the land south of the Mogollon Rim lies 4,000 to 5,000 feet (1,200 to 1,500 m) above sea level, with the escarpment rising to about 8,000 ft (2,400 m). Extensive Ponderosa pine forests are found both on the slopes of the Rim and on the plateau to the north. The Mogollon Rim is a major floristic and faunal boundary, with species characteristic of the Rocky Mountains living on the top of the plateau, and species native to the Mexican Sierra Madre Occidental on the slopes below and in the Madrean Sky Islands (high, isolated mountain ranges) further south.

The Mogollon Rim's limestones and sandstones were formed from sediments deposited in the Carboniferous and Permian Periods. Several of the Rim's rock formations are also seen on the walls of the Grand Canyon. In many places, the Rim is capped or buried by extensive basaltic lava flows.

The uppermost sandstone stratum of the Mogollon Rim, called the Coconino Sandstone, forms white cliffs reaching several hundred feet high at some points. This formation of the Permian Period is of aeolian (windblown) origin and is one of the thickest sand-dune-derived sandstones on earth.

Cities and towns near the Mogollon Rim include Sedona, Payson, Show Low, Alpine and Pinetop-Lakeside. The Mogollon Rim is practically bisected by Interstate 17 which runs north-to-south between Flagstaff and Phoenix.

In June 2002, the eastern portion of the Mogollon Rim was the site of Arizona's second-largest wildfire, the 470,000-acre (1,900 km^{2}) Rodeo–Chediski Fire. The Mogollon Rim was also the site of the Dude fire that started on June 25, 1990. This fire grew to cover over 30,000 acres (120 km^{2}) and killed six wildland firefighters. Other large fires have burned along the Mogollon Rim since 1990, and the area's Ponderosa pine forests remain vulnerable because of past fire-suppression efforts and the buildup of available dry fuel.

Western novel author Zane Grey built a hunting cabin on the slopes of the Mogollon Rim just northeast of Payson, above Tonto Creek. The cabin was restored by the Phoenix air-conditioning magnate William Goettl during the late 1960s, but it was destroyed by the Dude Fire in 1990.

Louis L'Amour's novel The Sackett Brand, set near the Mogollon Rim, includes descriptions of its cliffs.

Cross country skiing is possible atop sections of the Mogollon rim after winter snowstorms. The average winter snowfall near Happy Jack, Arizona is typically quoted as being between roughly 60 and 100 inches (152 and 254 cm respectively), with some winters receiving much more snowfall and others less. This is similar to Munds Park, AZ and other high elevation areas atop the Mogollon rim. Areas to the east such as those near Forest Lakes and Heber, Arizona, may receive less average snowfall before averages increase again towards Pinetop-Lakeside, AZ and McNary, Arizona, and the White Mountains.

== Flora and Fauna ==
The Mogollon rim falls within the wider Arizona/New Mexico Mountains ecoregion, which contains a diverse array of plant and animal life. There may be at least 2,817 native species of vascular plants in the Arizona/New Mexico Mountains ecoregion as of 1999. This area includes virtually the entire Mogollon rim region and adjacent areas.

Plant species that may be encountered in the region include Ponderosa Pine, Arizona White Oak, Emory Oak, Gambel Oak, Quaking Aspen, Arizona Walnut, Alligator Juniper, Douglas fir, Engelmann Spruce, White Fir, Arizona Sycamore, Bigtooth Maple, various Penstemon species, Golden Columbine, Arizona Thistle, several Opuntia species, Agave chrysantha, and numerous species of the family Asteraceae.

Animal species that may be encountered in the region include Rocky Mountain elk, Coyote, American black bear, Bighorn sheep, Javelina, Cougar, Mule deer, more than 300 bird species, North American beaver, more than 20 bat species, Western Hercules Beetle, Giant Desert Centipede, Arizona Blonde Tarantula, Arizona Black Rattlesnake, Arizona Mountain Kingsnake, Wright's mountain tree frog, Canyon tree frog, Western chorus frog, isolated populations of the Chiricahua leopard frog and the Northern leopard frog, Barred tiger salamander, native fish species such as; Roundtail chub, Gila trout, Speckled dace, Longfin dace as well as established introduced fish species such as Rainbow trout, Brown trout, Largemouth bass, Smallmouth bass, Green sunfish, Bluegill and Crayfish.

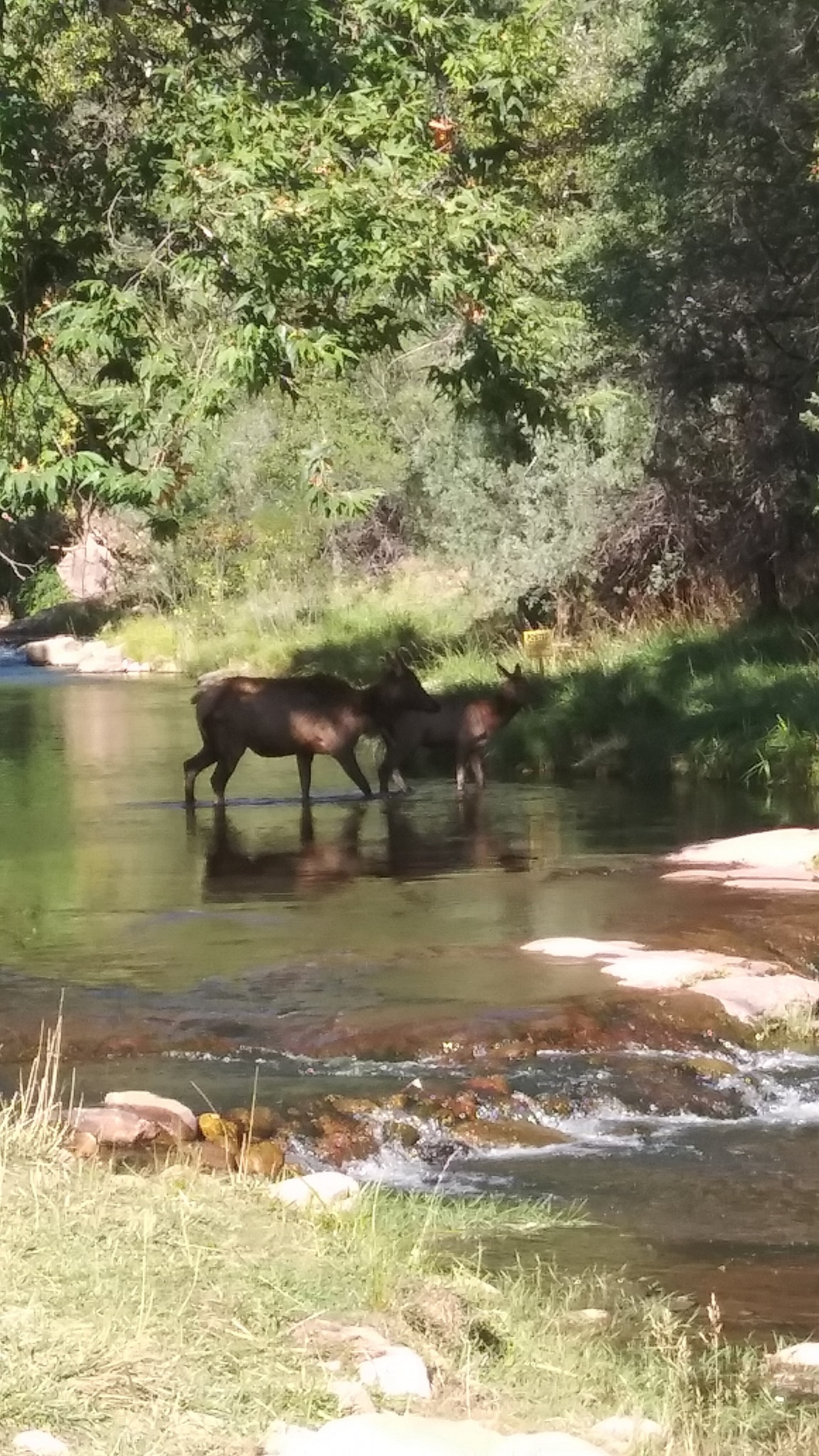
Elk in the East Verde River

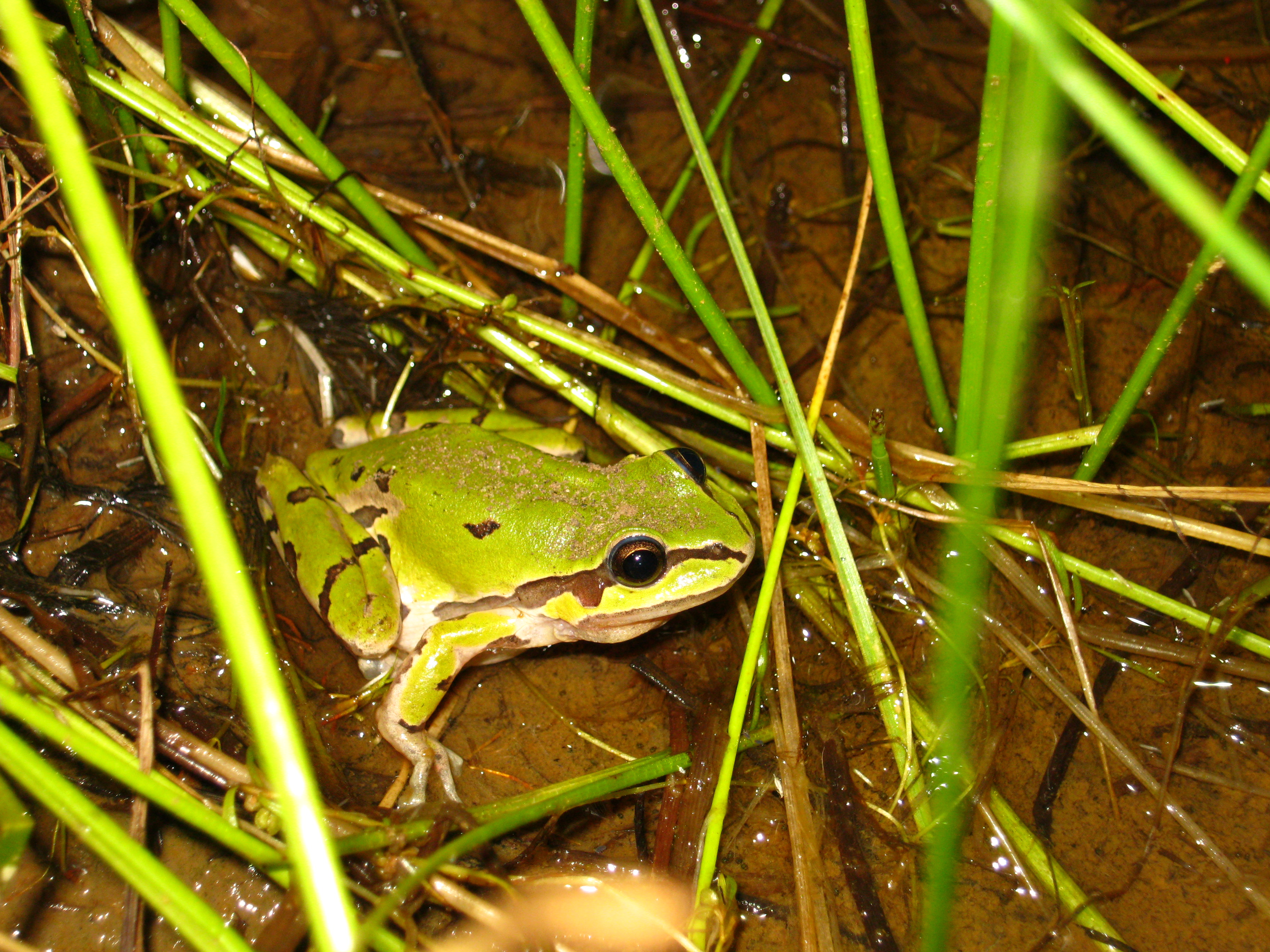
Wright's mountain tree frog, Coconino County, AZ

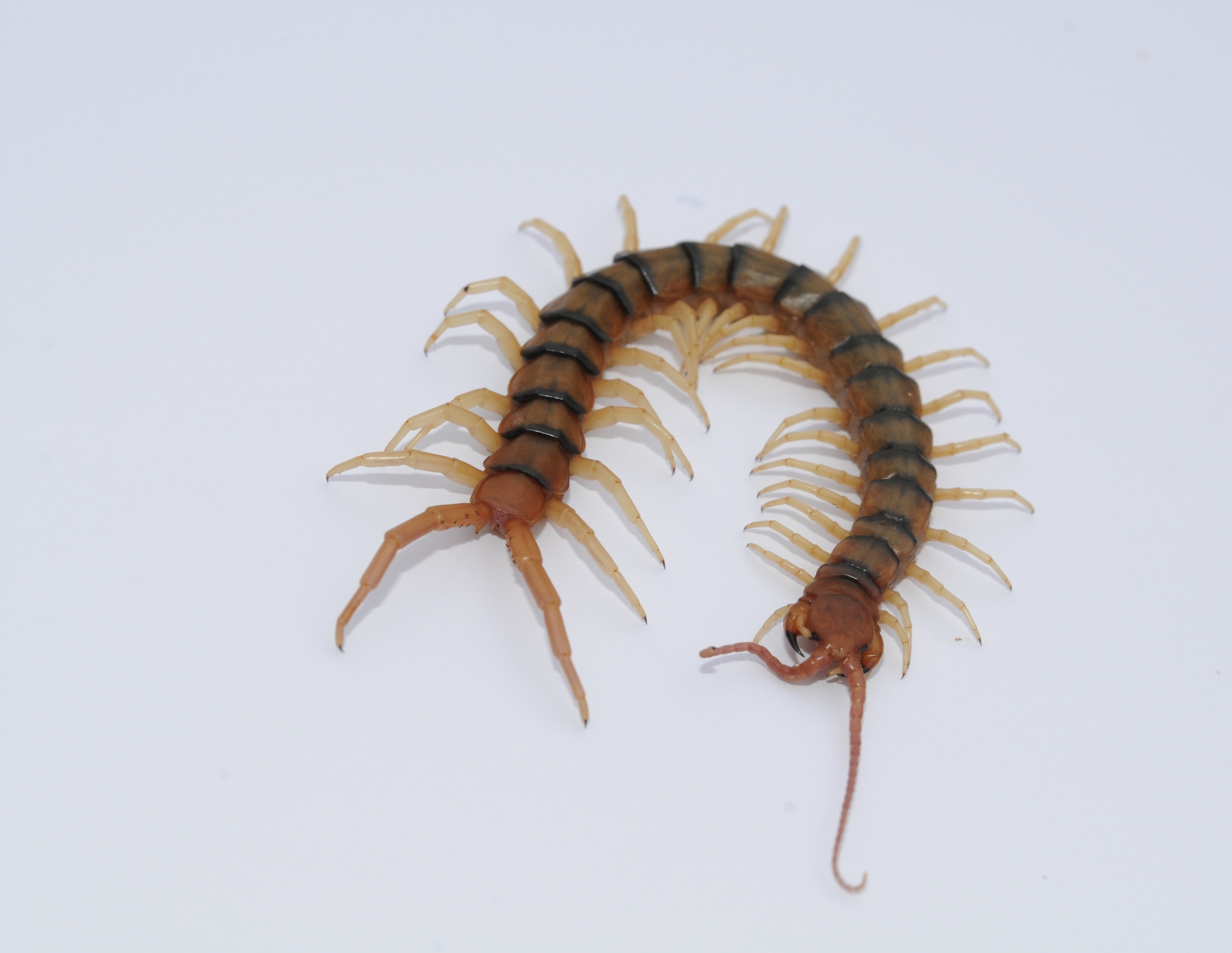
Scolopendra polymorpha, near Payson, AZ

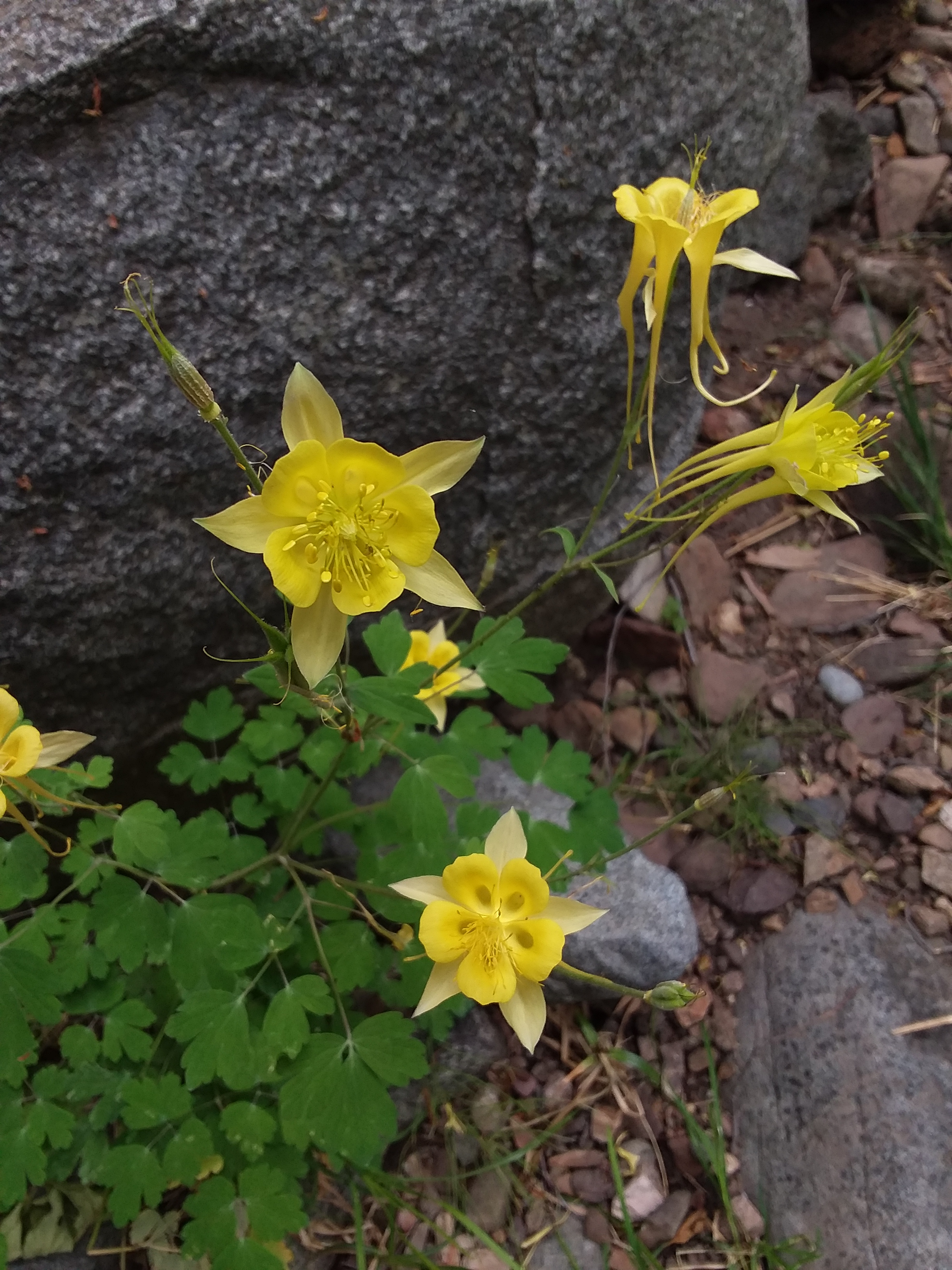
Columbine Gila County, AZ

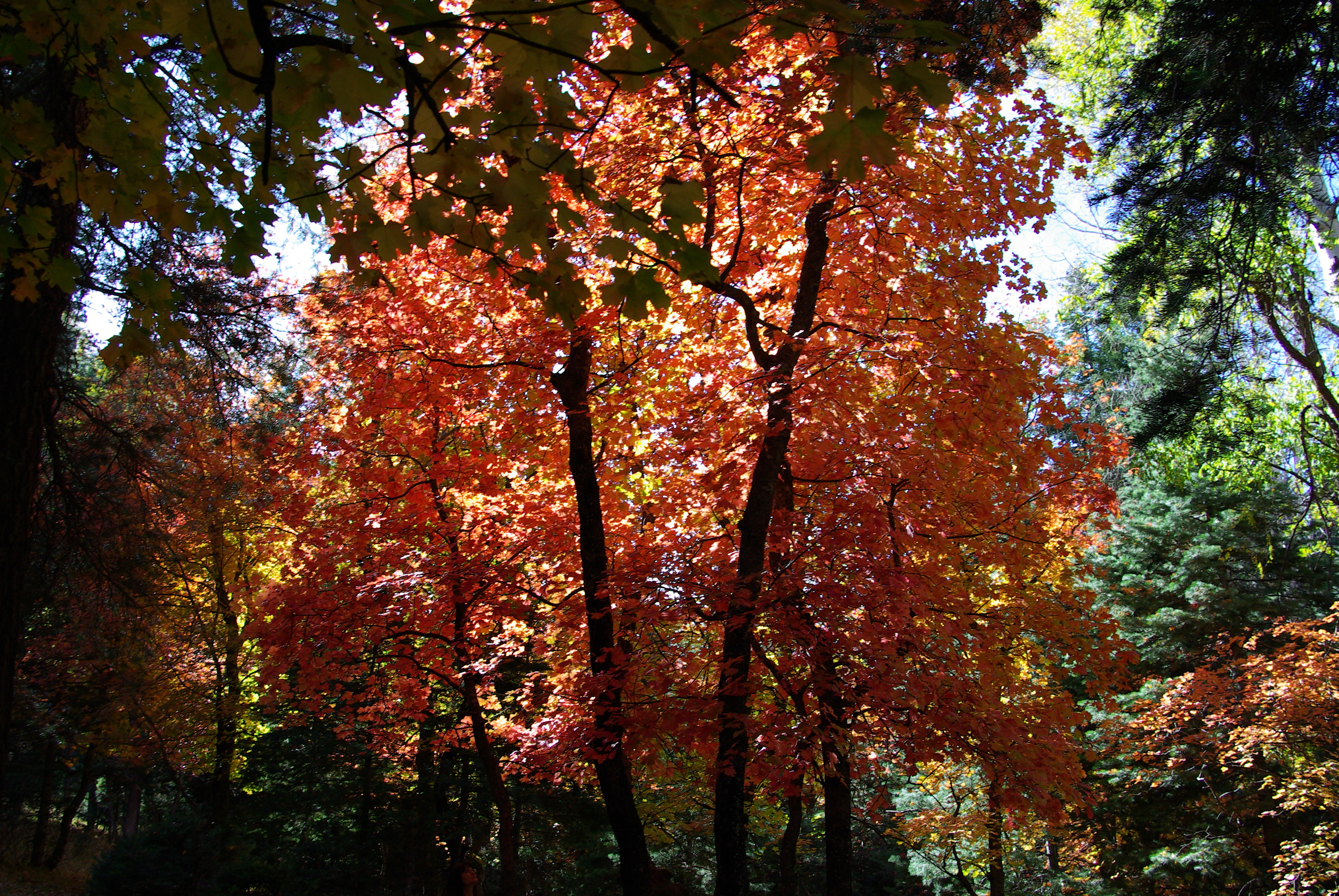

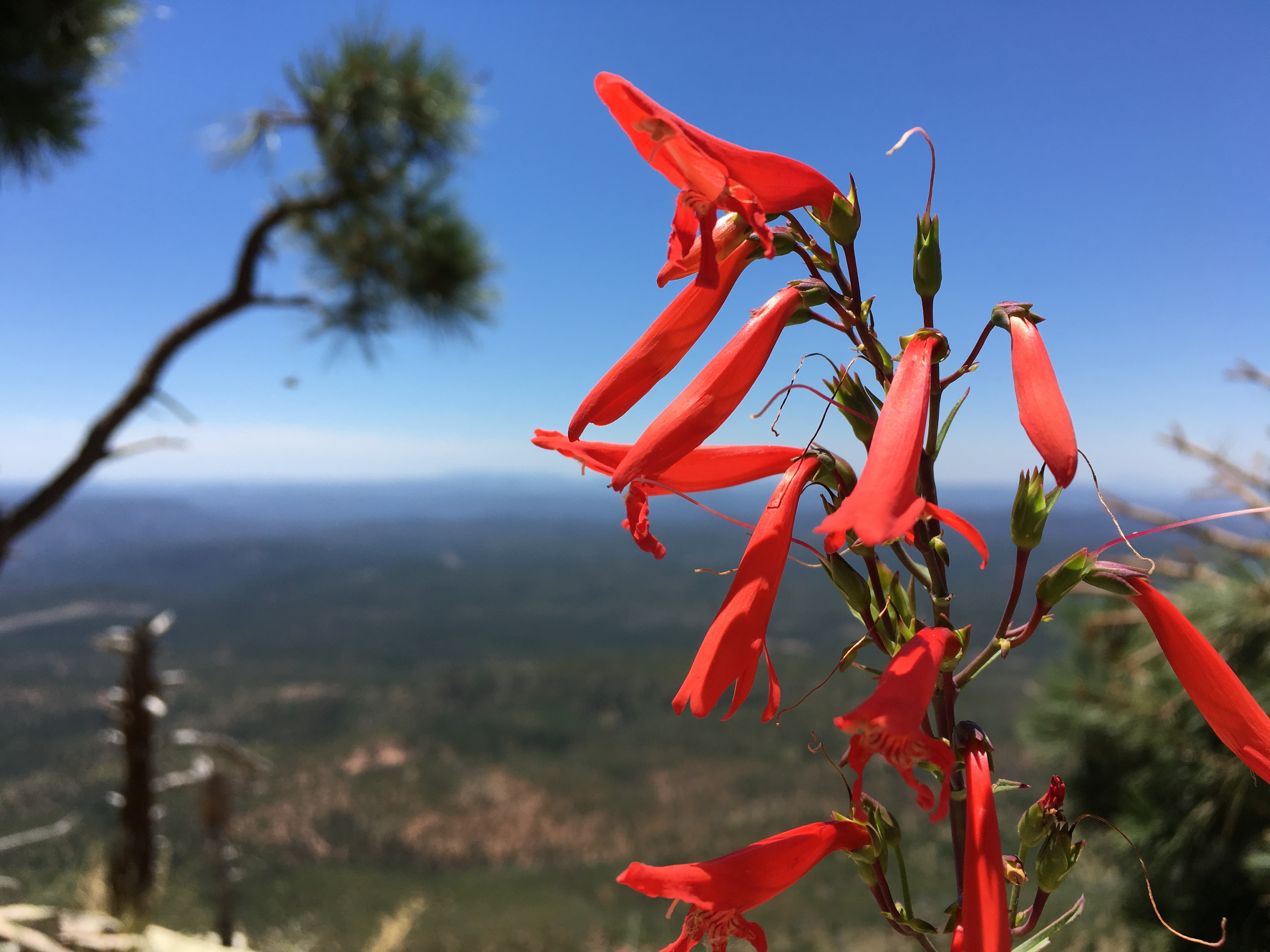
Penstemon atop the Mogollon rim

== Hydrology ==
The Mogollon rim drains an extensive area, and has numerous springs and creeks (perennial and intermittent) draining from it. The Verde Valley alone may have more than 820 natural springs, many of which originate from surface precipitation and subsurface waters of the Mogollon rim. Springs along the Mogollon rim can occur in almost all local rock types and the ground water flow system may be highly complex and spring water flow may be highly variable. Average annual precipitation along the Mogollon rim is also somewhat variable by location and elevation, some high areas along the edge of the rim and in high elevation canyons may receive in excess of 30-35 inches (762-889mm) of annual precipitation. Precipitation is generally split between two seasons of increased precipitation, one in winter from November-April where much of the precipitation may fall as snow at higher elevations and the other being the summer North American monsoon from mid June to the end of September. It is estimated that at least 1,730,000 acre-feet of precipitation falls on the Mogollon rim annually on average.

Some of the many creeks that drain from the Mogollon rim include: Sycamore Creek, Oak Creek, West Fork Oak Creek, Wet Beaver Creek, West Clear Creek, East Clear Creek, Fossil Creek, Pine Creek, East Verde River, Tonto Creek, Horton Creek, Christopher Creek, Hunter Creek, Haigler Creek, Canyon Creek, Cibecue Creek, and Carrizo Creek.

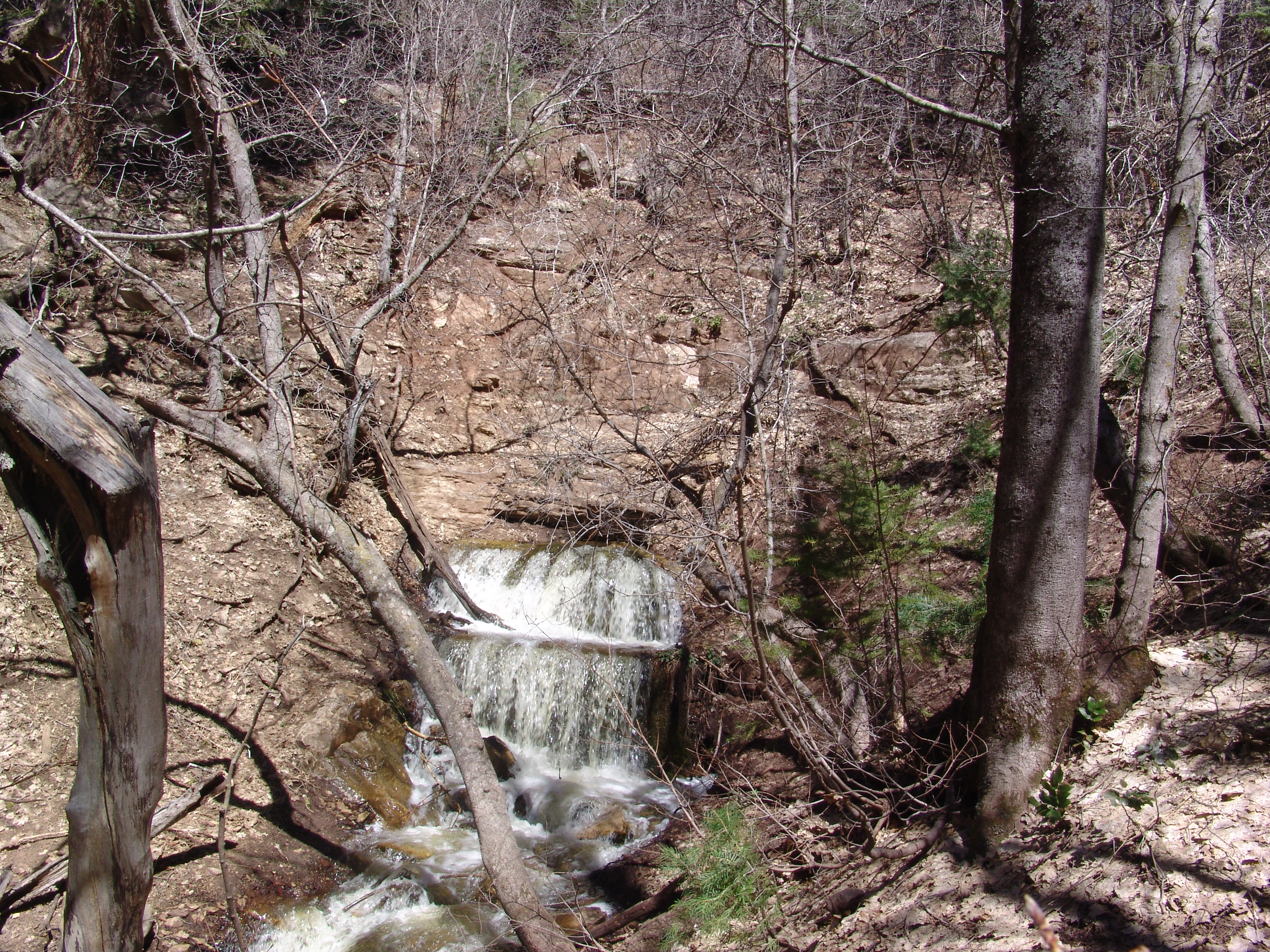
One of the two adjacent springs that form Horton Creek, collectively called Horton Springs. These springs emerge from the rock just under the Mogollon rim.

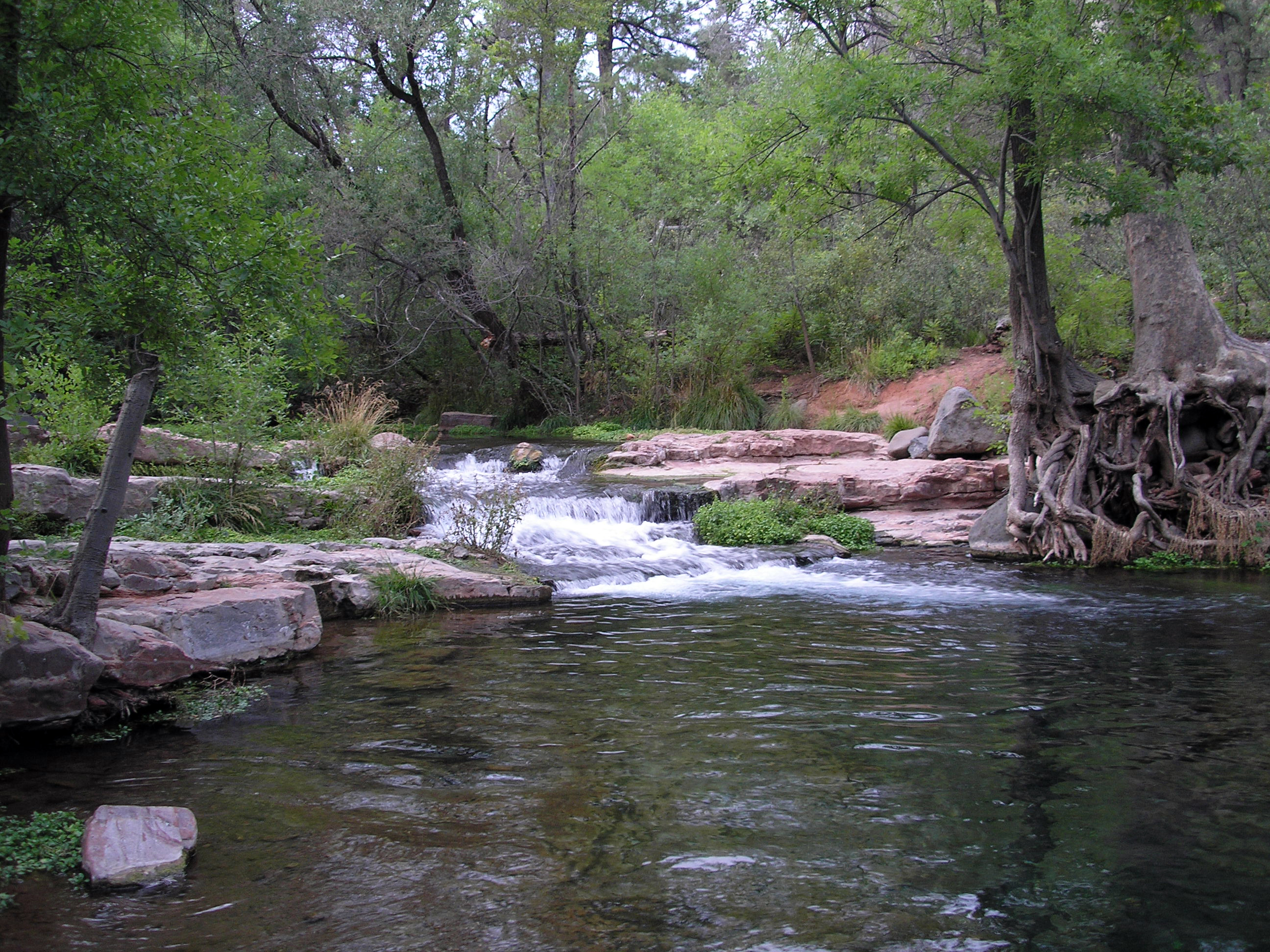
Fossil Springs, Fossil Creek

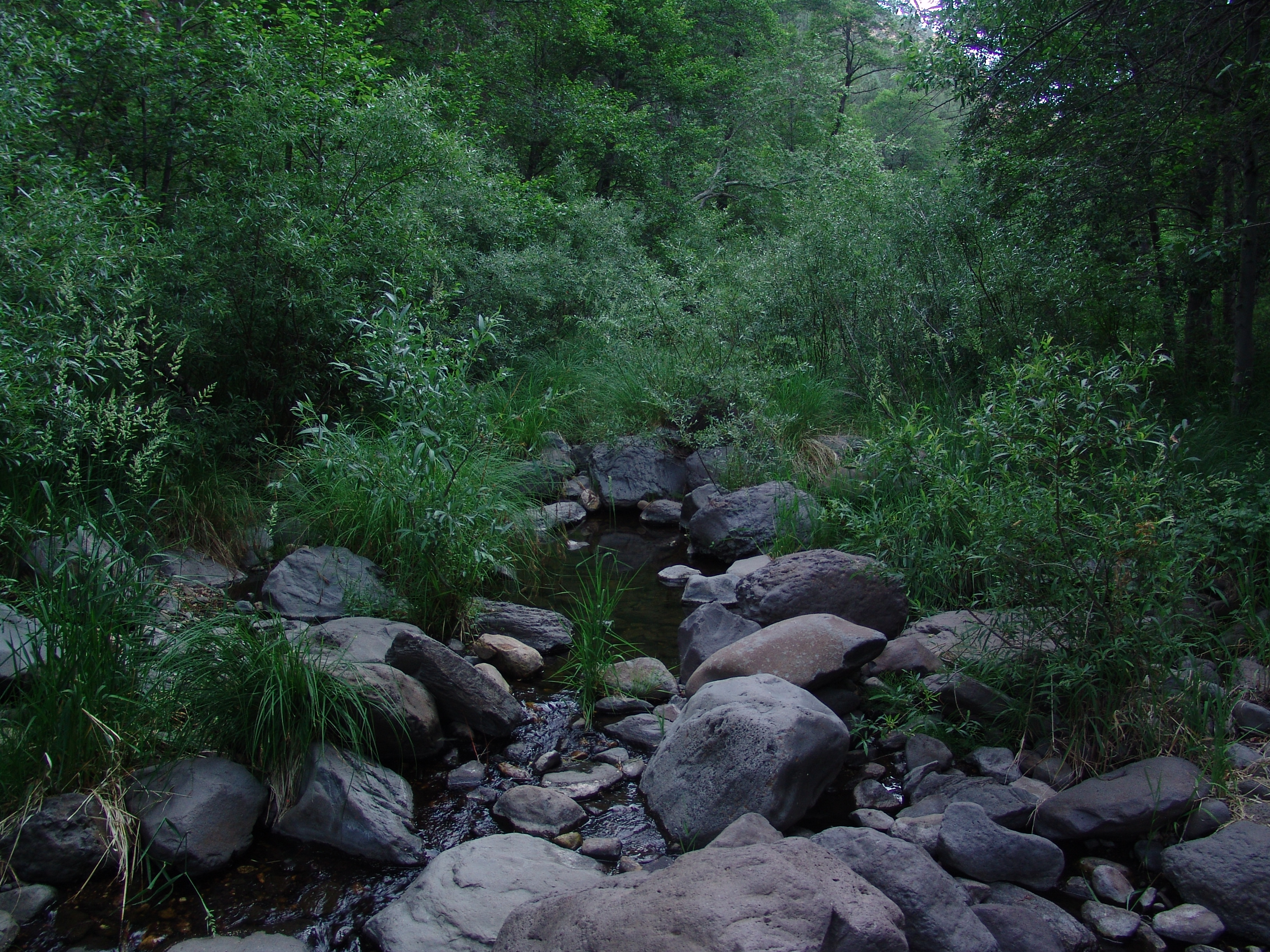
Upper Oak Creek, above the confluence with West Fork Oak Creek.

== Gallery ==
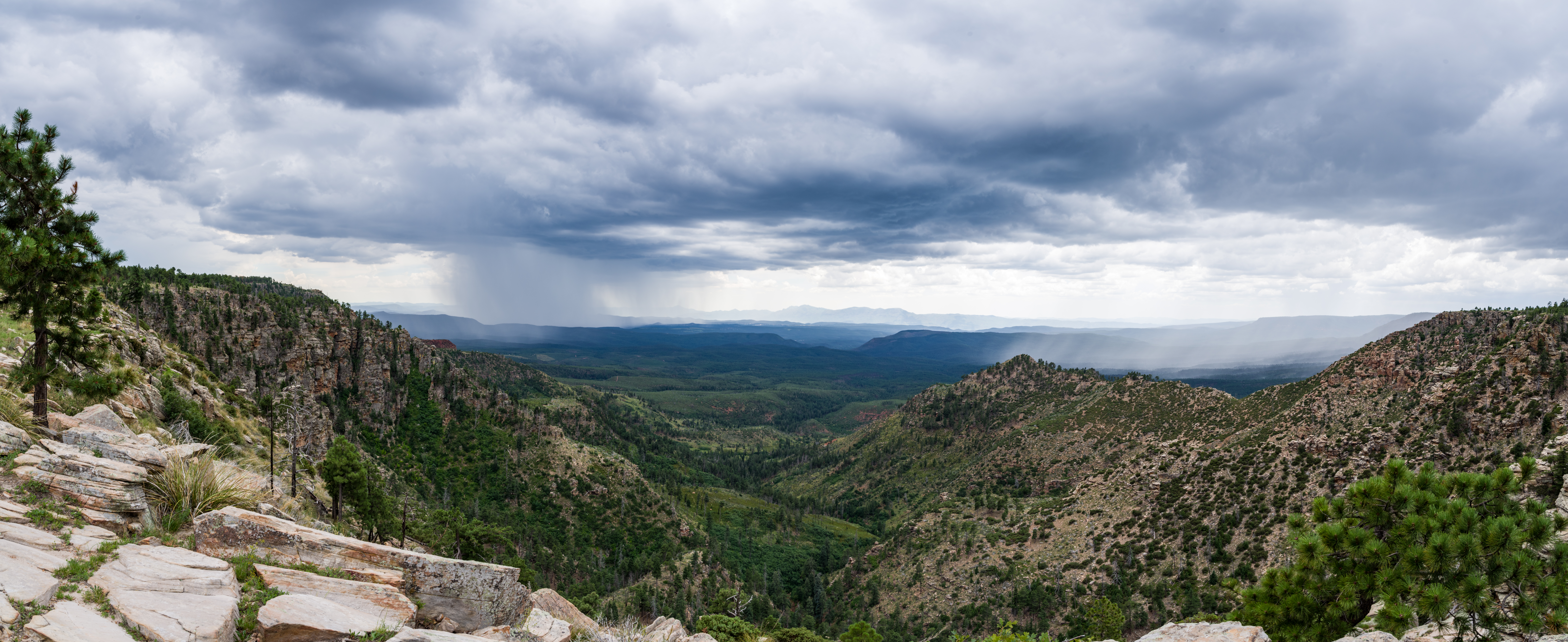

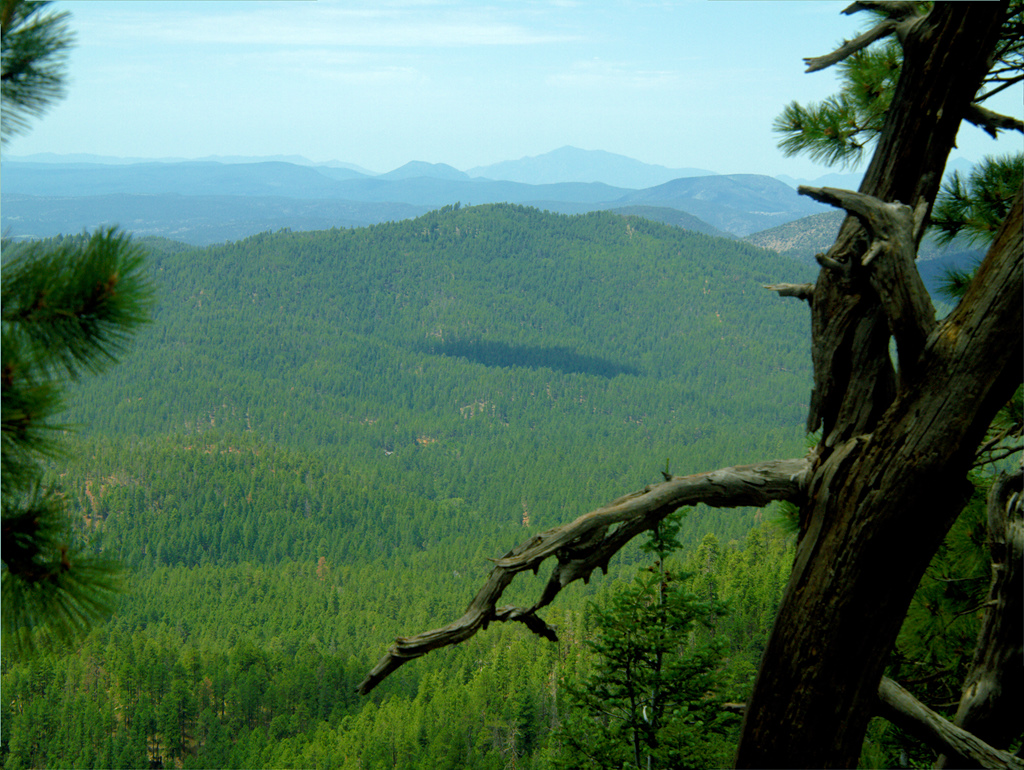

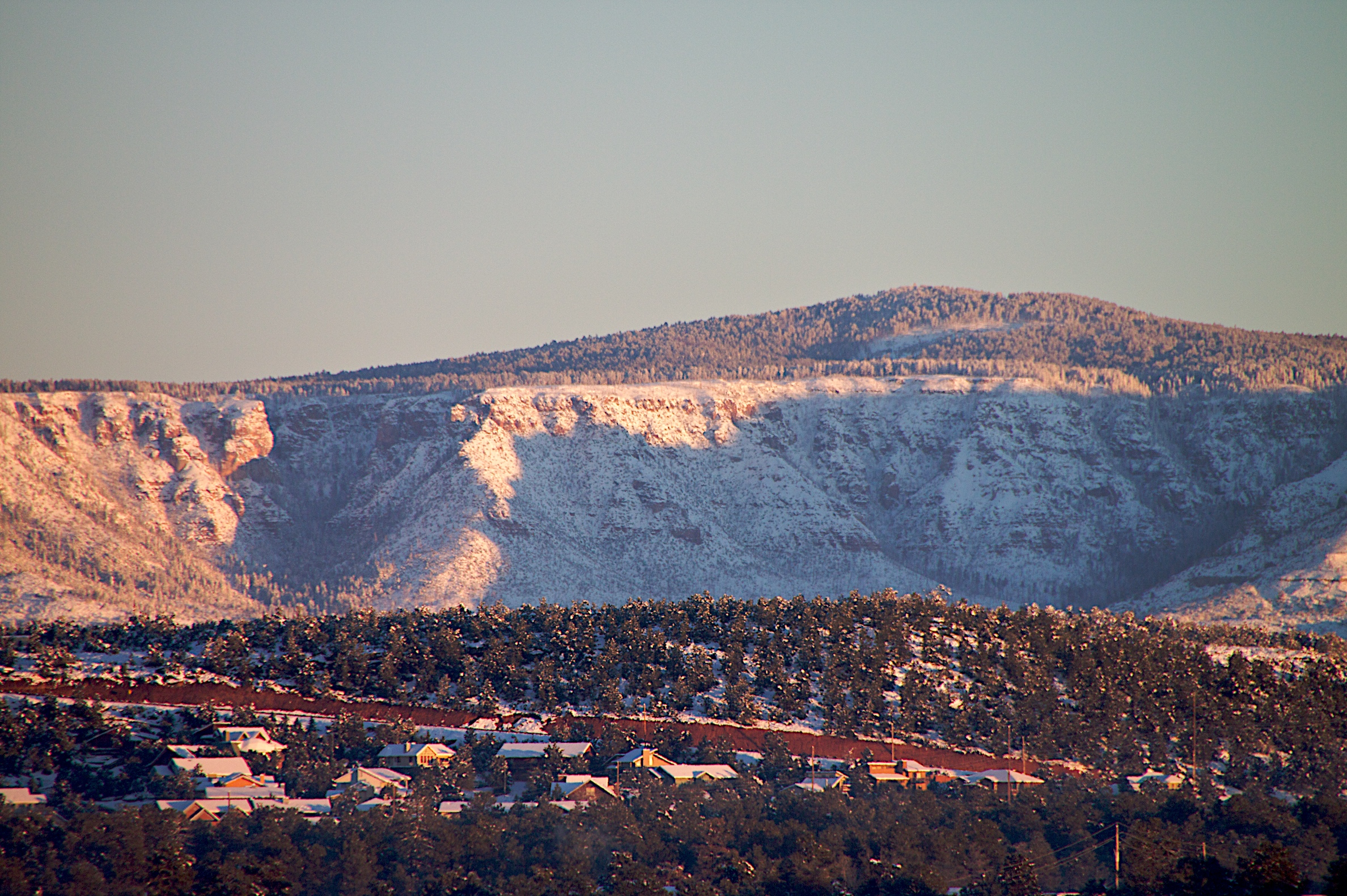
Mogollon Rim viewed from Payson, Arizona

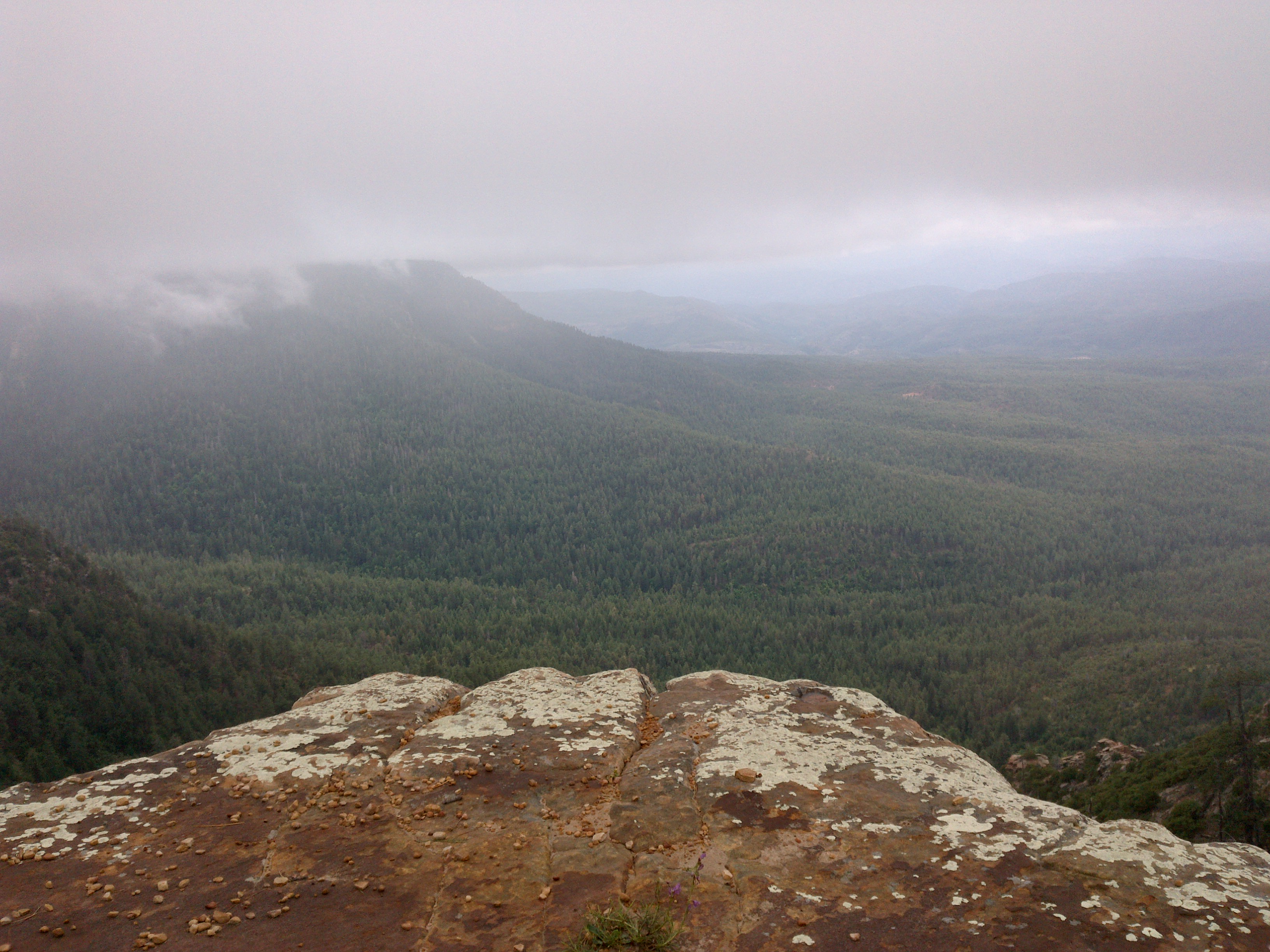

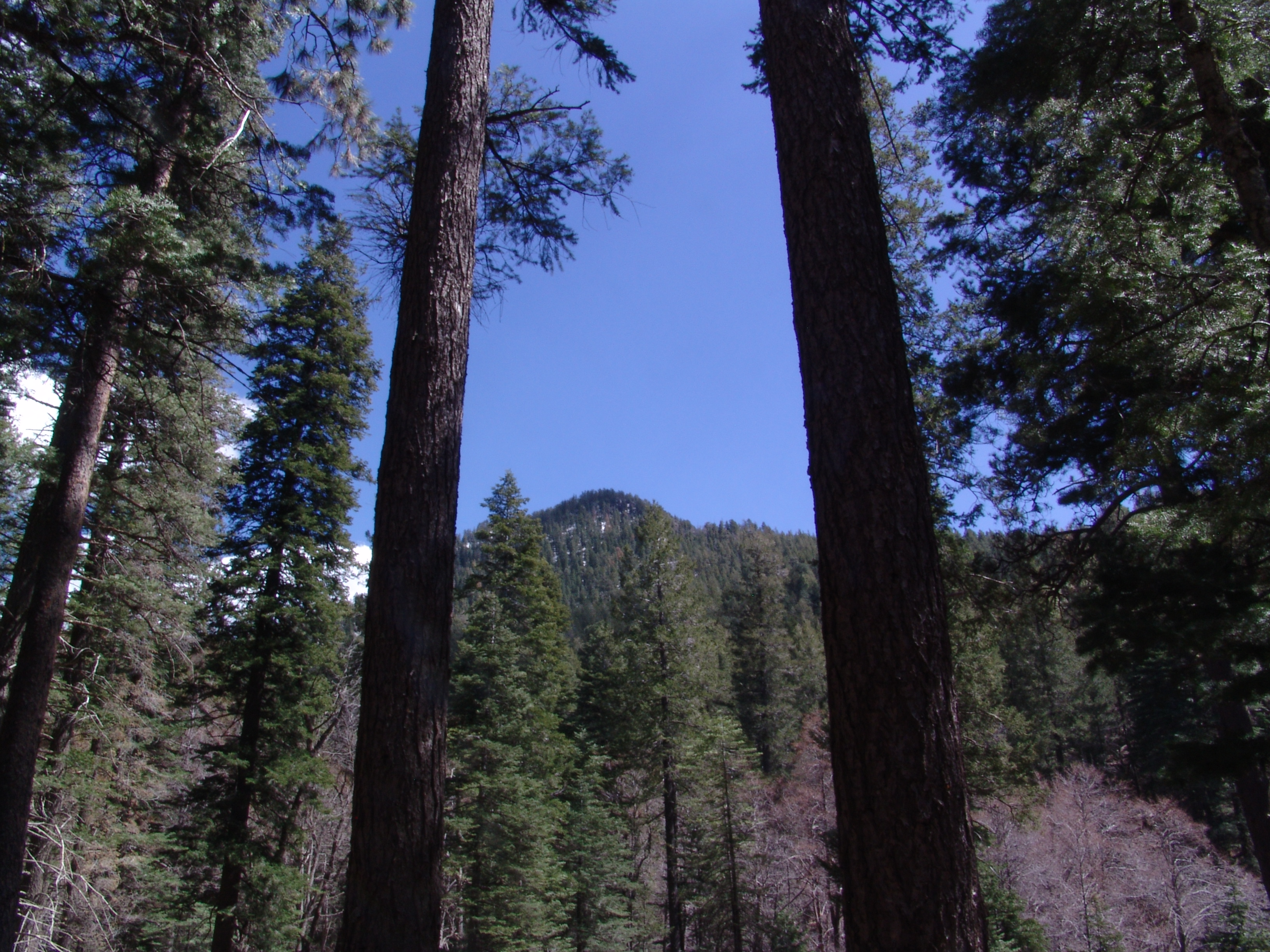

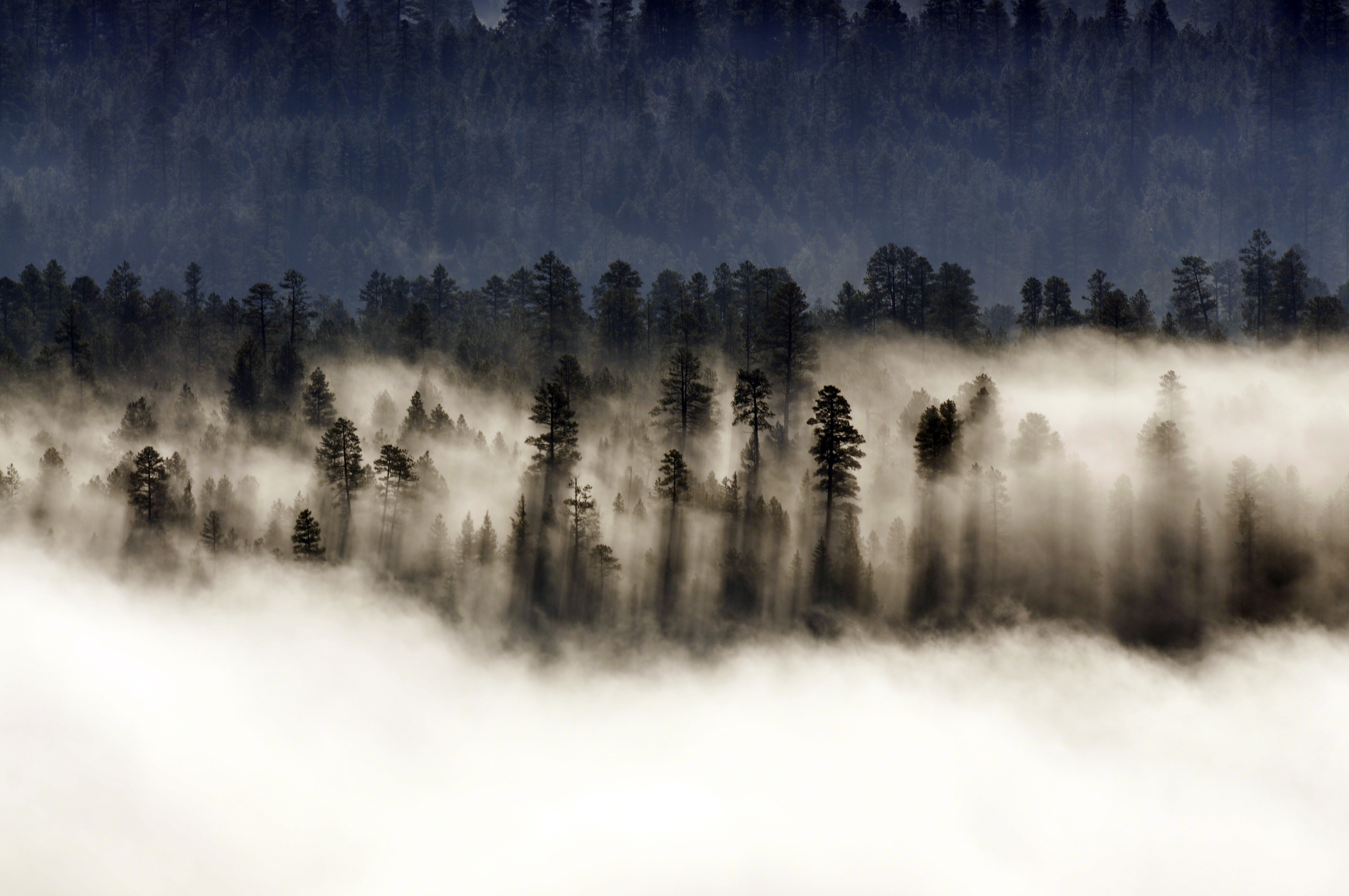
Misty forest atop the Mogollon Rim near East Clear Creek

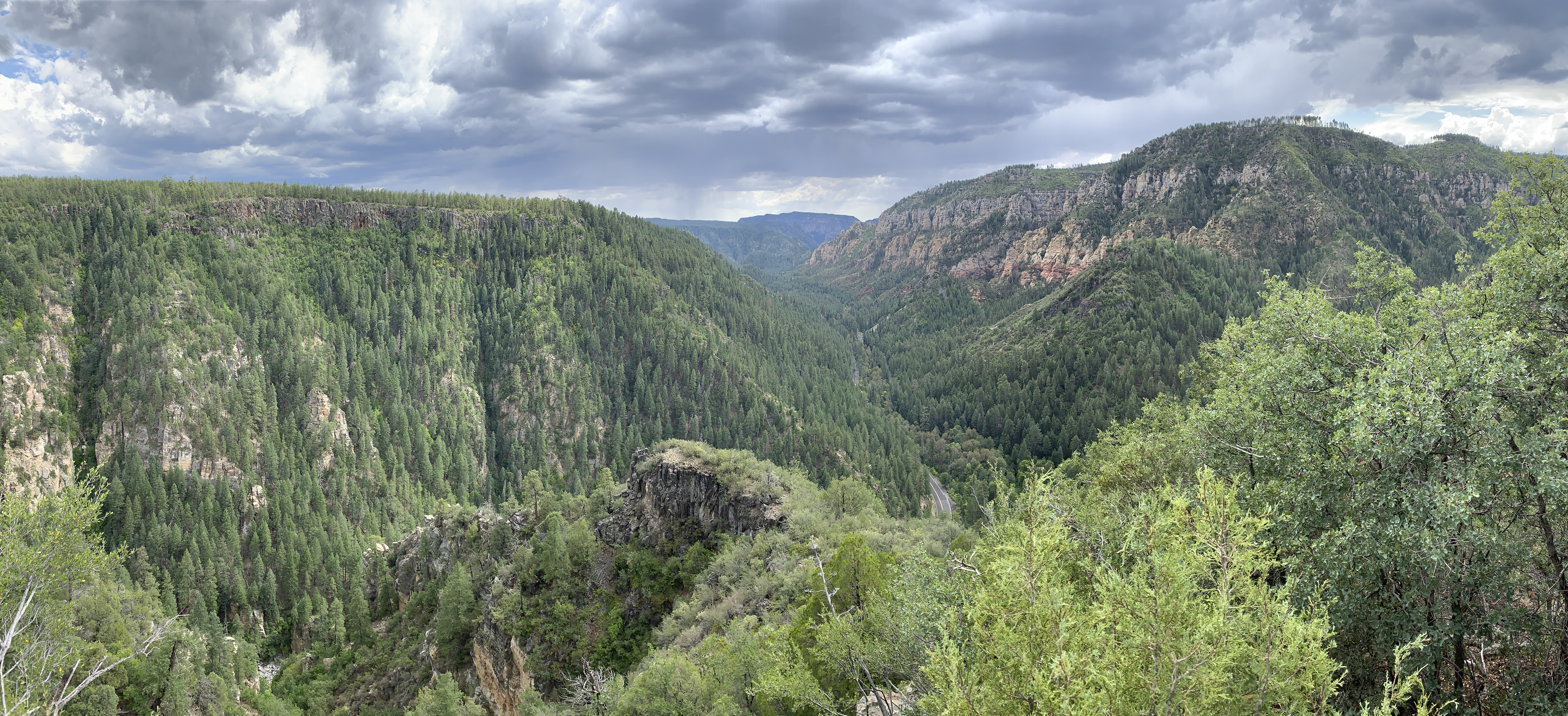
Oak Creek Canyon

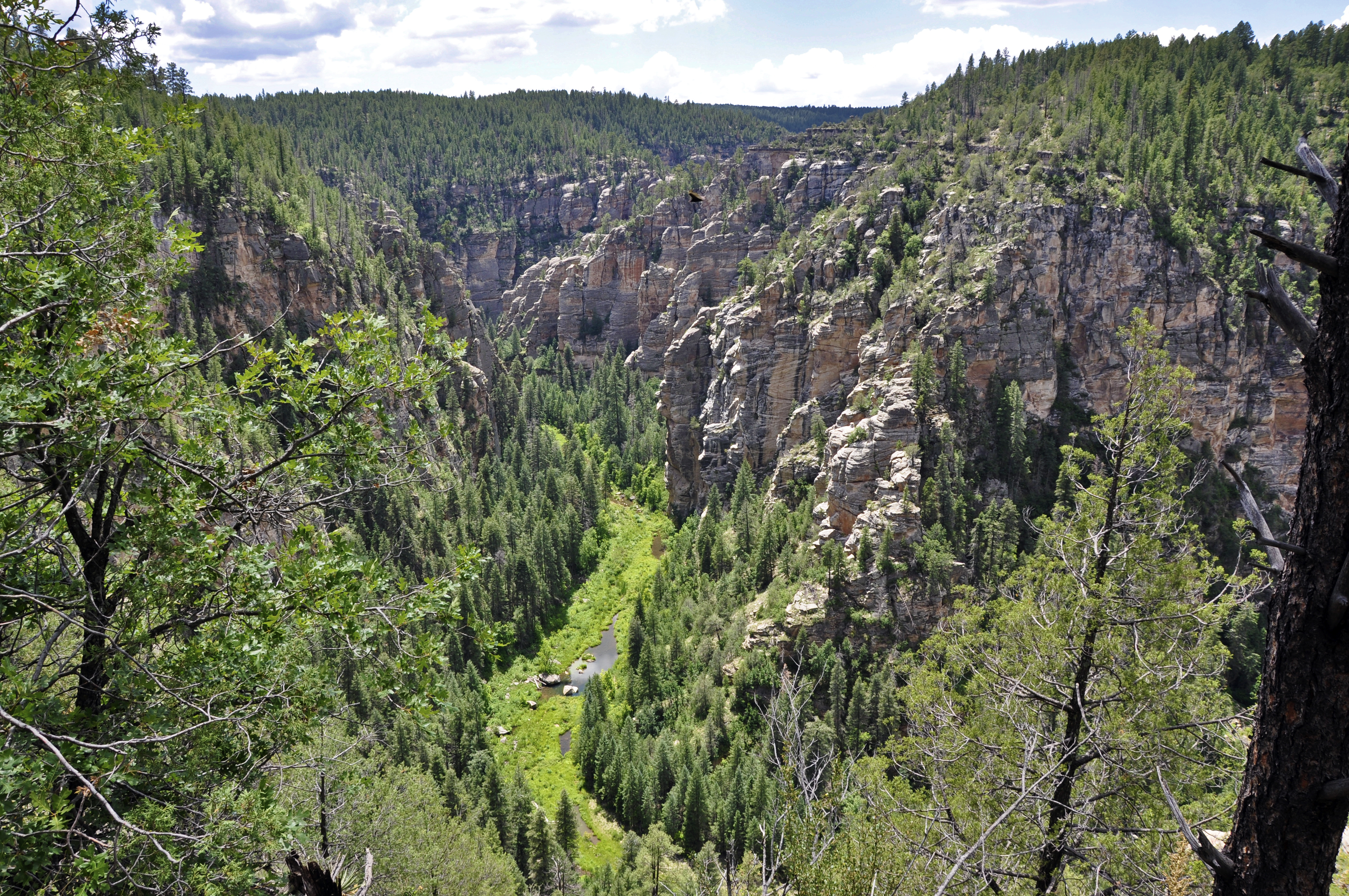
West Clear Creek Wilderness

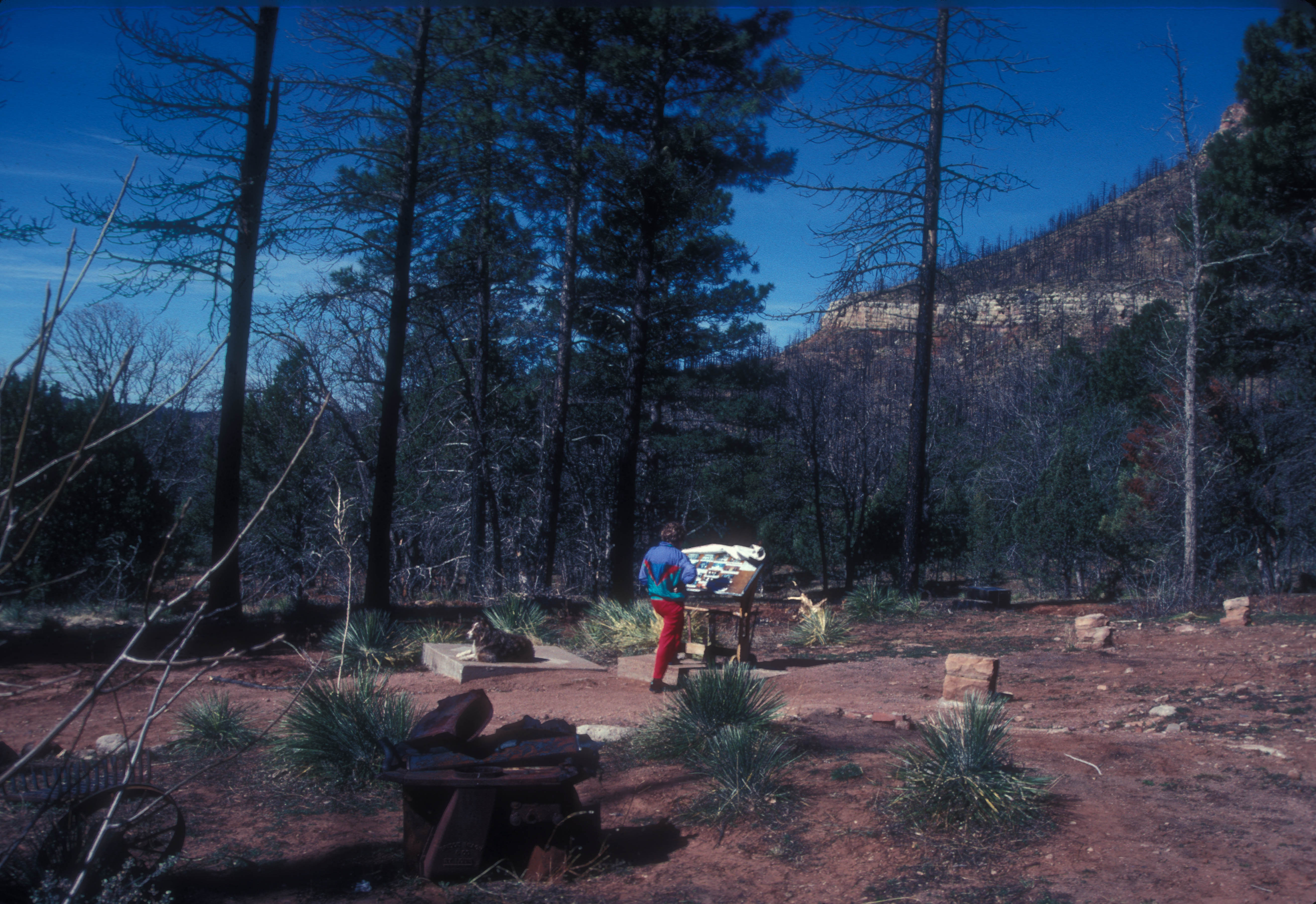
Site of Zane Grey's lodge

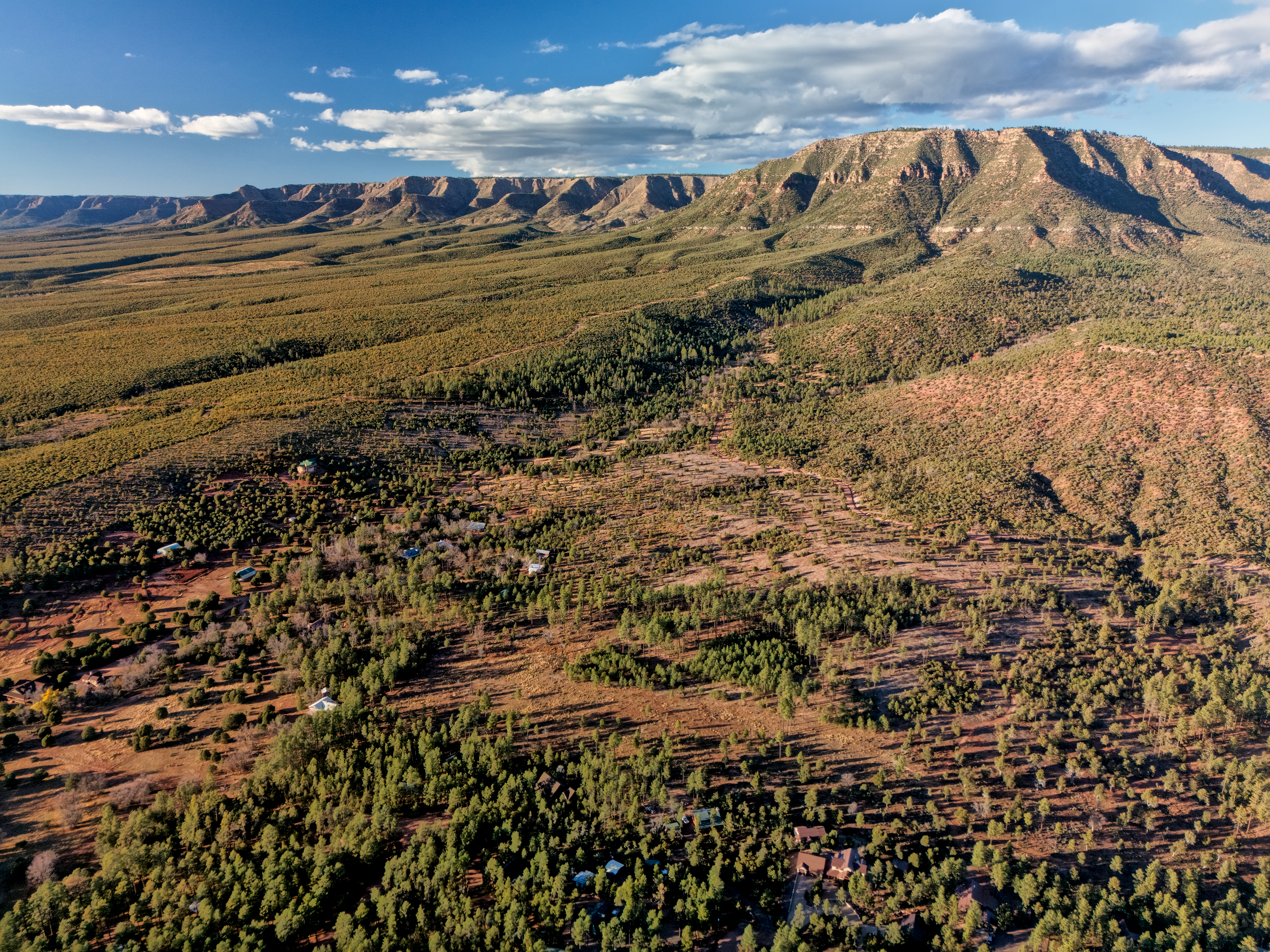
Aerial view of the Mogollon Rim from above Mead Ranch

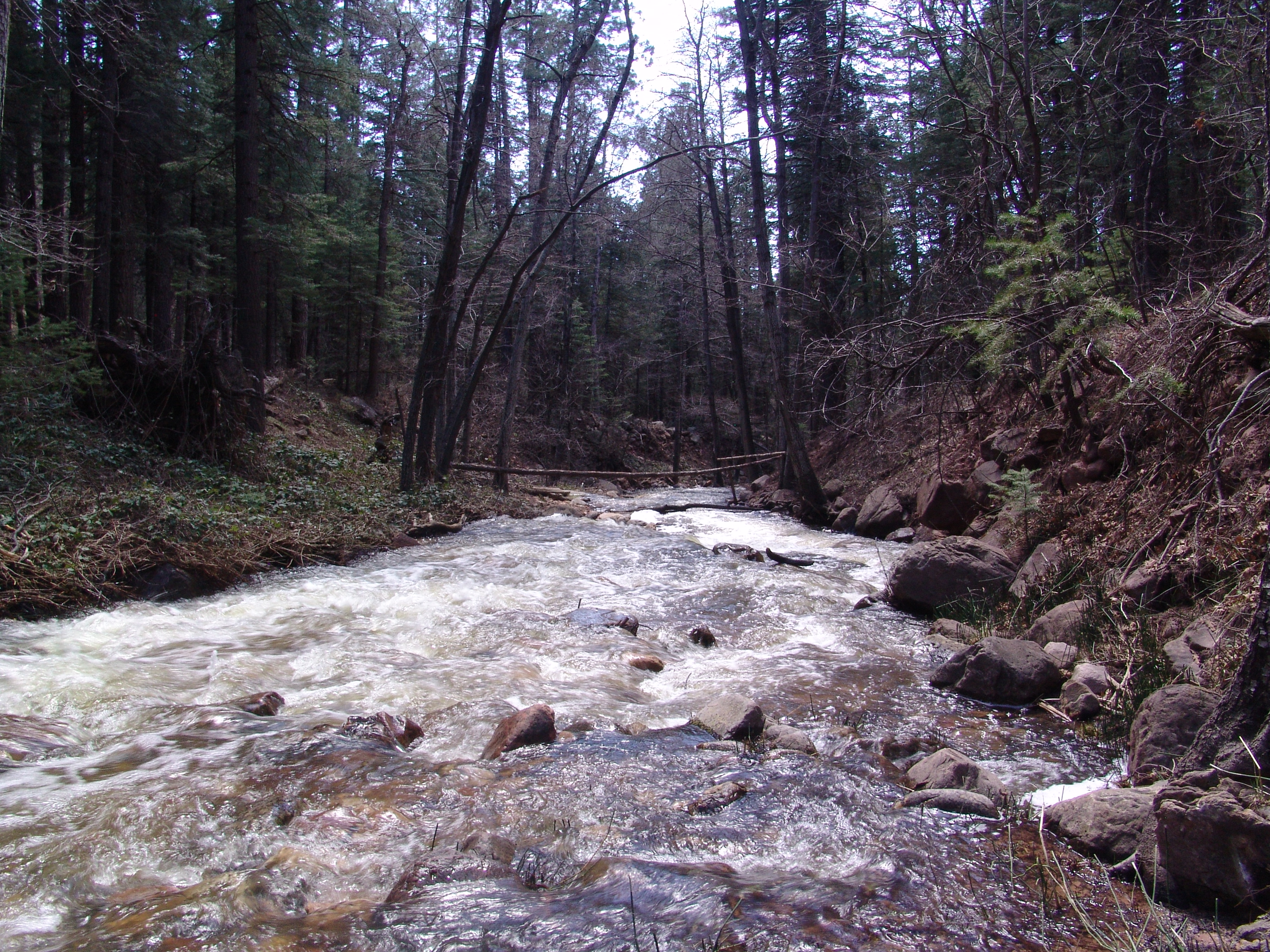
Horton Creek

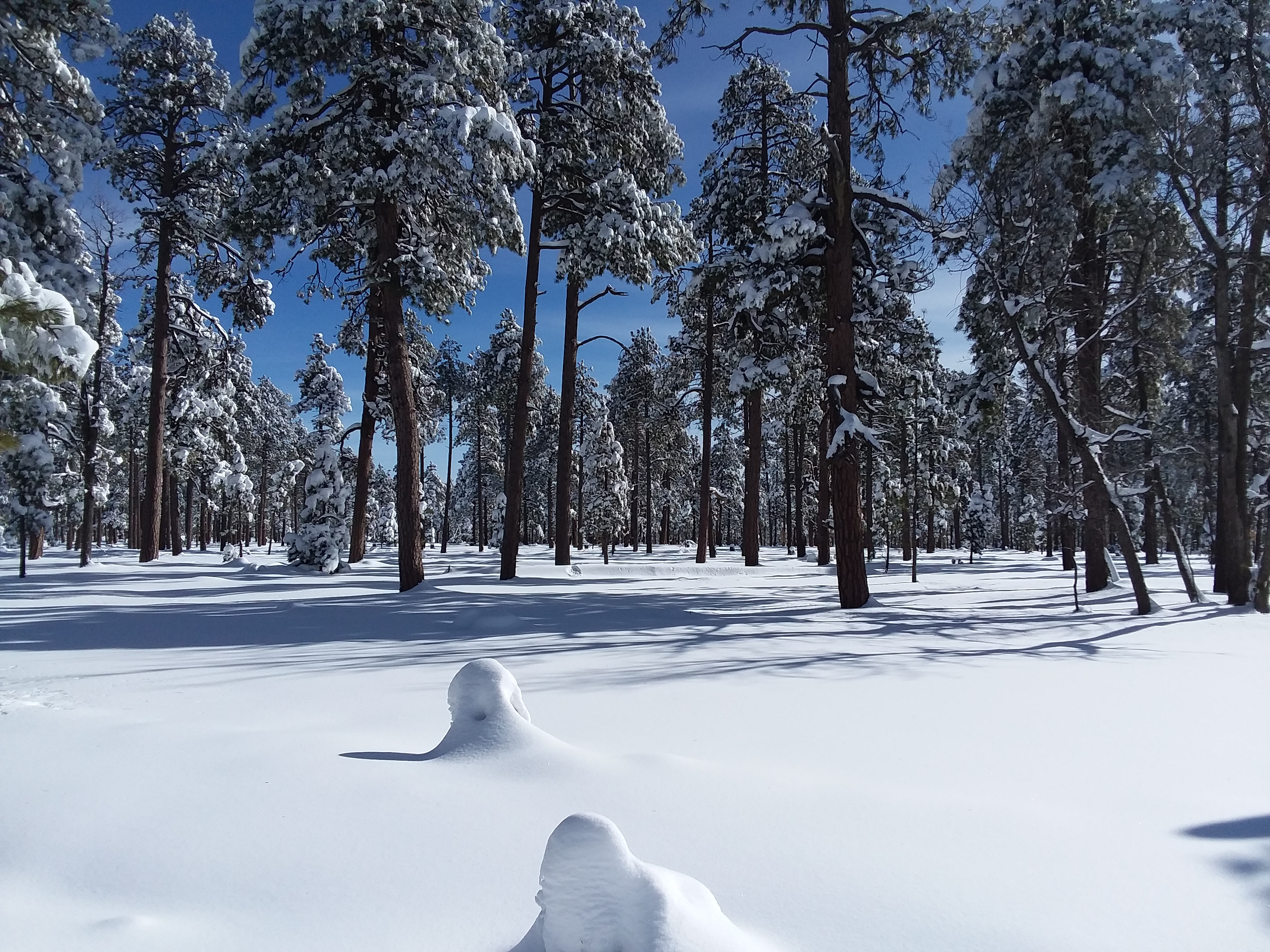

Video

== See also ==
- Hellsgate Wilderness
- Mogollon Monster
- Mogollon Mountains
- Pinyon-juniper woodland
- List of escarpments
