= Oak Creek (Verde River tributary) =

River in Arizona, United States

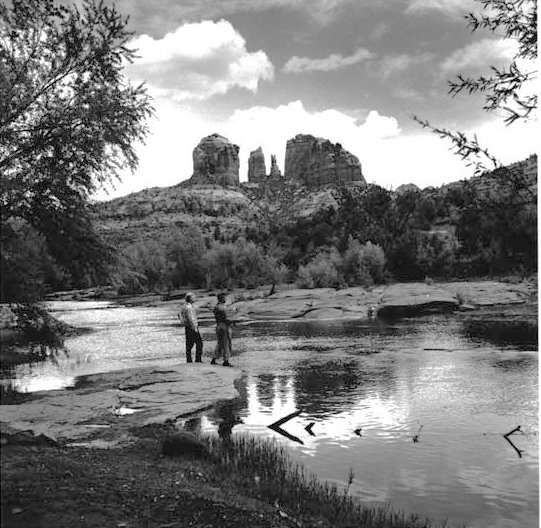
- Oak Creek flowing by Cathedral Rock in Coconino National Forest

Location
- Country: United States
- State: Arizona
- County: Yavapai, Coconino

Physical characteristics
- Source
  - location: Mogollon Rim
  - coordinates: 34.920350°N 111.675368°W
- Mouth: Verde River
  - location: near Cottonwood
  - coordinates: 34.677956°N 111.941455°W
- Length: 50 mi (80 km)
- Discharge
  - location: near Cottonwood

Oak Creek is a major tributary of the Verde River in northern Arizona, United States. It is around 50 miles (80 km) long, with its source along the Mogollon Rim, south of Flagstaff. It empties into the Verde River around 6 miles (9.7 km) southeast of Cottonwood. It flows through Oak Creek Canyon for the upper third (around 15 miles (24 km)) of its course, between Flagstaff and Sedona.

Oak Creek begins at river mile 62 of the Verde River.

== See also ==
- List of rivers of Arizona
