= Horton Creek (Arizona) =

Stream in Pima County, Arizona, US

Coordinates: 34°20′24″N 111°05′43″W

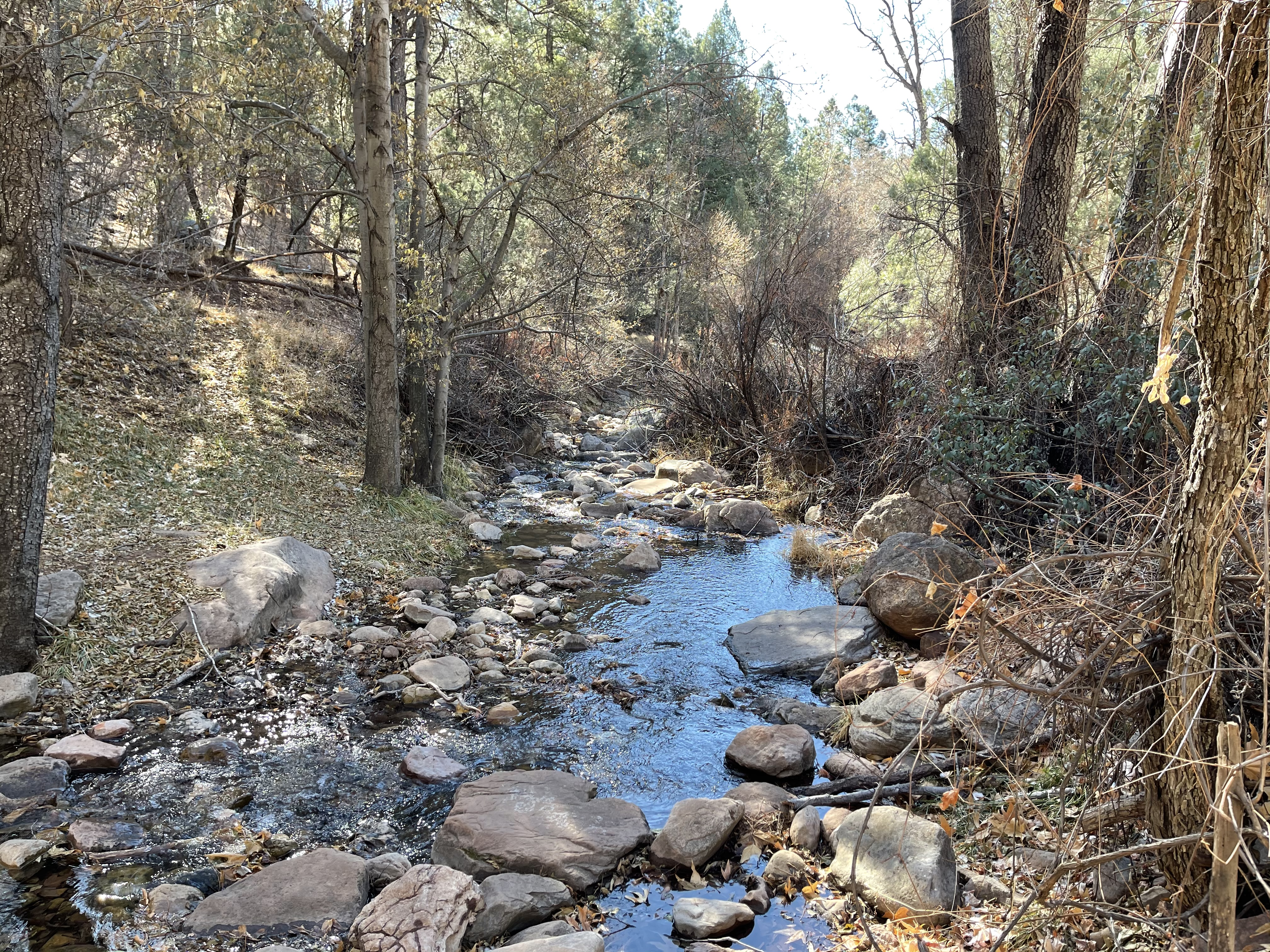

Location
- Country: United States
- State: Arizona

Physical characteristics
- Source
  - location: spring
  - elevation: 6,700 ft (2,000 m)
- Mouth
  - location: confluence with Tonto Creek
  - elevation: 5,400 ft (1,600 m)

Horton Creek is located in the Mogollon Rim area of the state of Arizona, United States. The closest town Payson is 20 miles (32 km) away. The facilities are maintained by Tonto National Forest division of the USDA Forest Service.

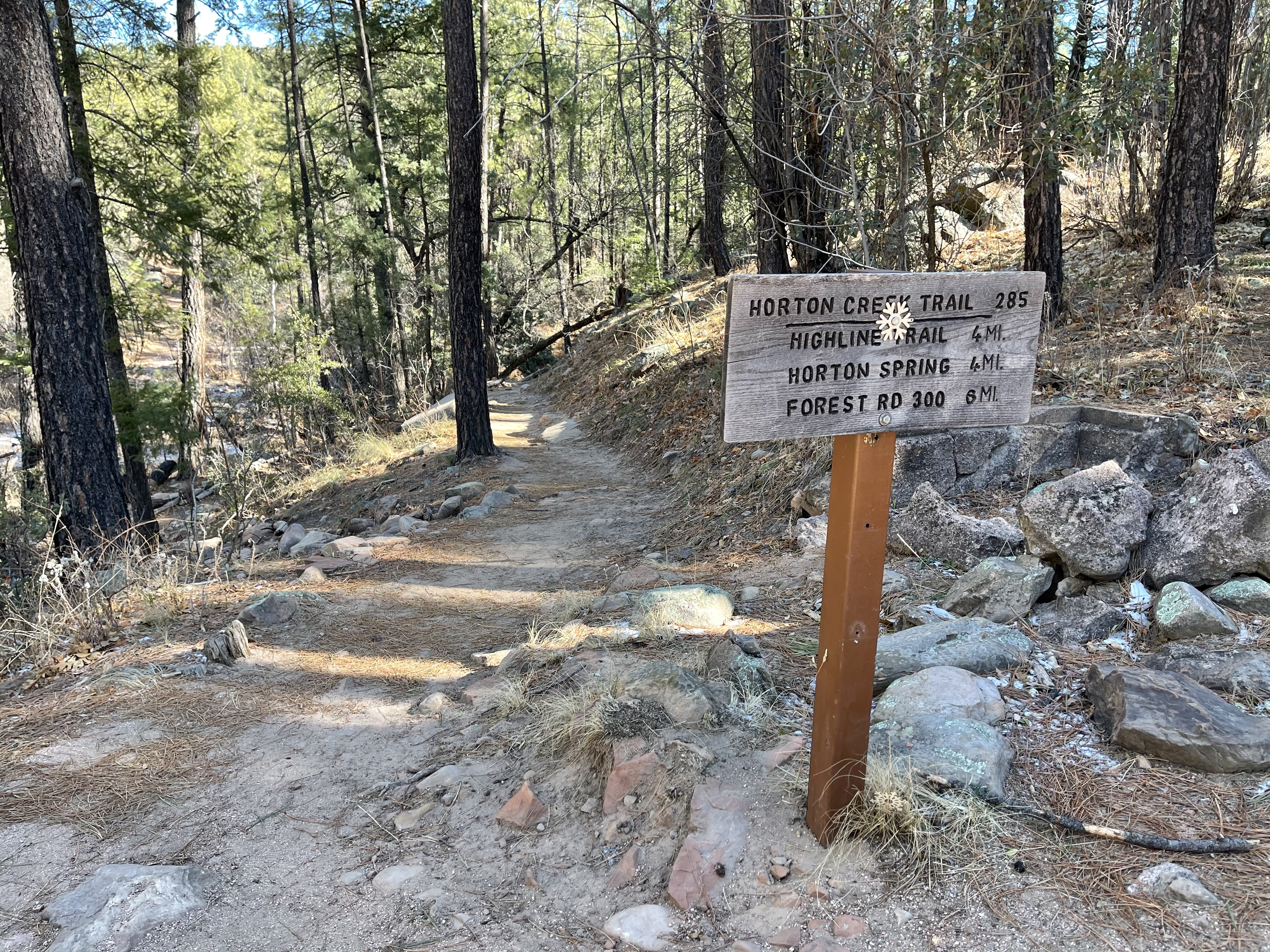
Horton Creek Trailhead off the Zane Grey Highway where Horton Creek enters Tonto Creek.

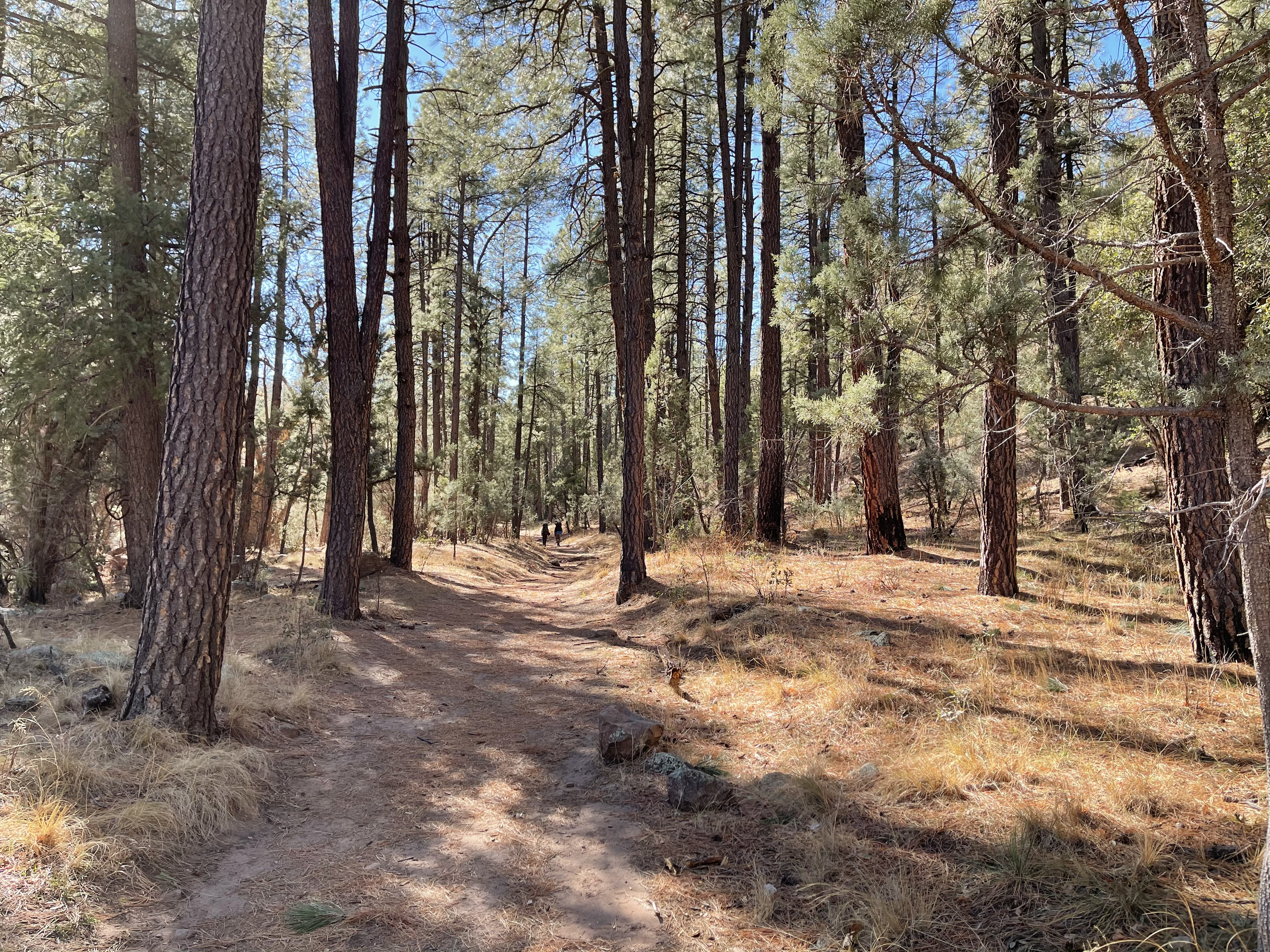
Horton Creek Trail passing through a forest of Arizona Ponderosa Pine.

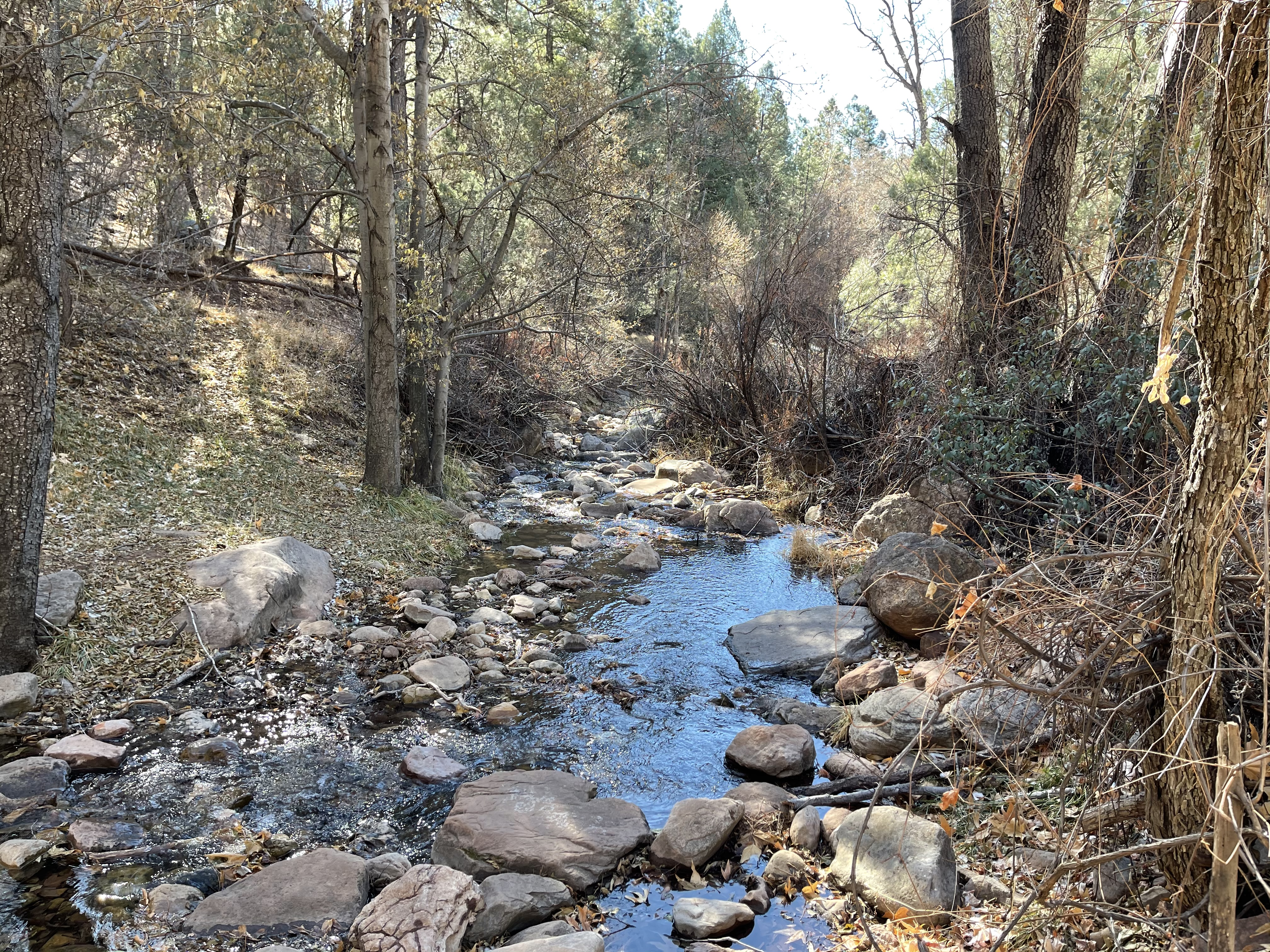
Horton Creek, Arizona in December.

== Fish species ==
- Rainbow trout
- Brown trout

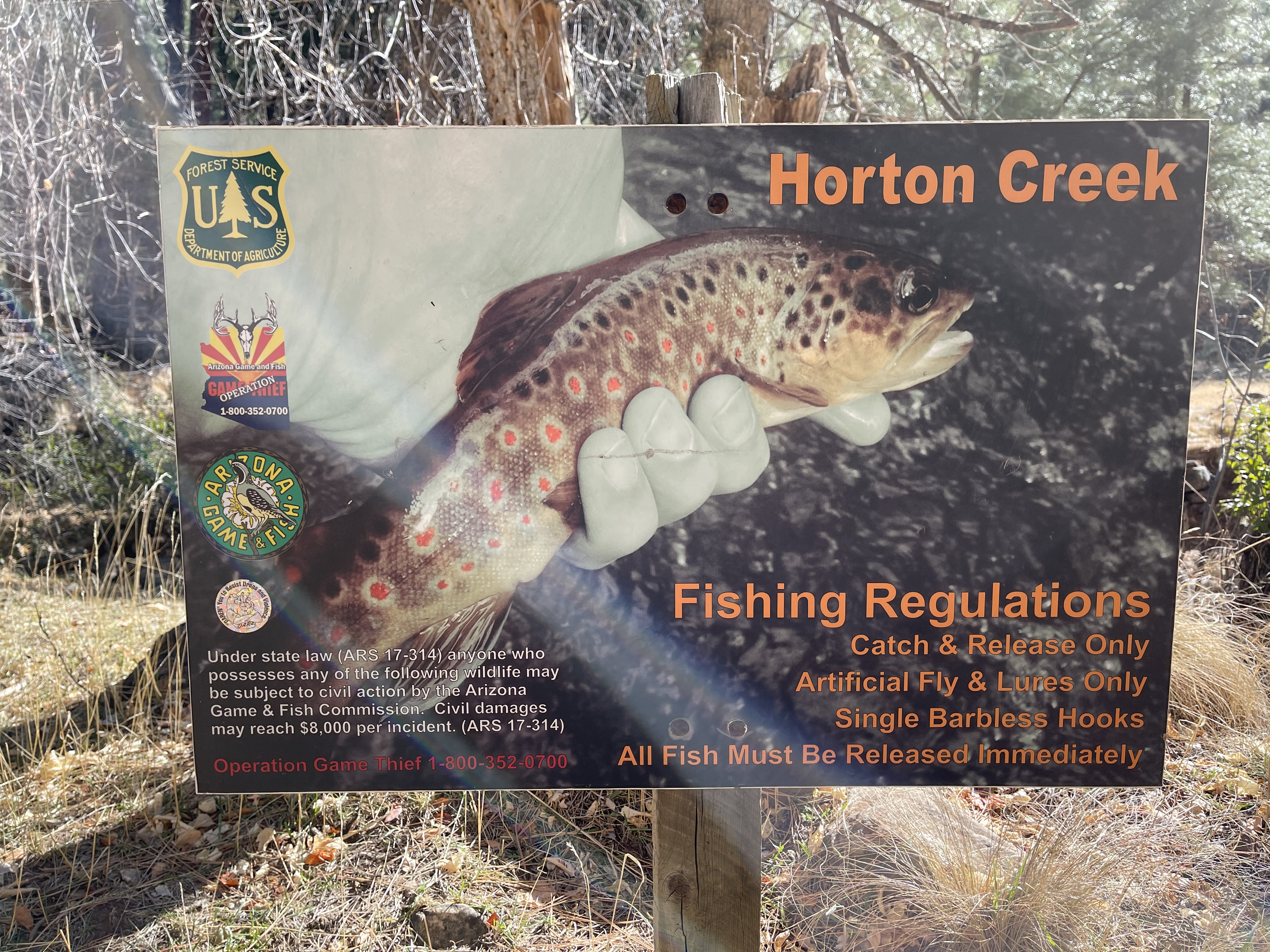
Horton Creek, Arizona fishing regulations.
