= West Clear Creek Wilderness =

Protected area in northern Arizona

- IUCN category Ib (wilderness area)
- Map of West Clear Creek Wilderness. Wilderness is bright green, West Clear Creek is red and Clover Creek is purple.
- Location: Yavapai / Coconino counties, Arizona, United States
- Nearest city: Camp Verde, Arizona
- Coordinates: 34°30′48″N 111°45′51″W
- Area: 15,238 acres (6,167 ha)
- Established: 1984
- Governing body: U.S. Forest Service

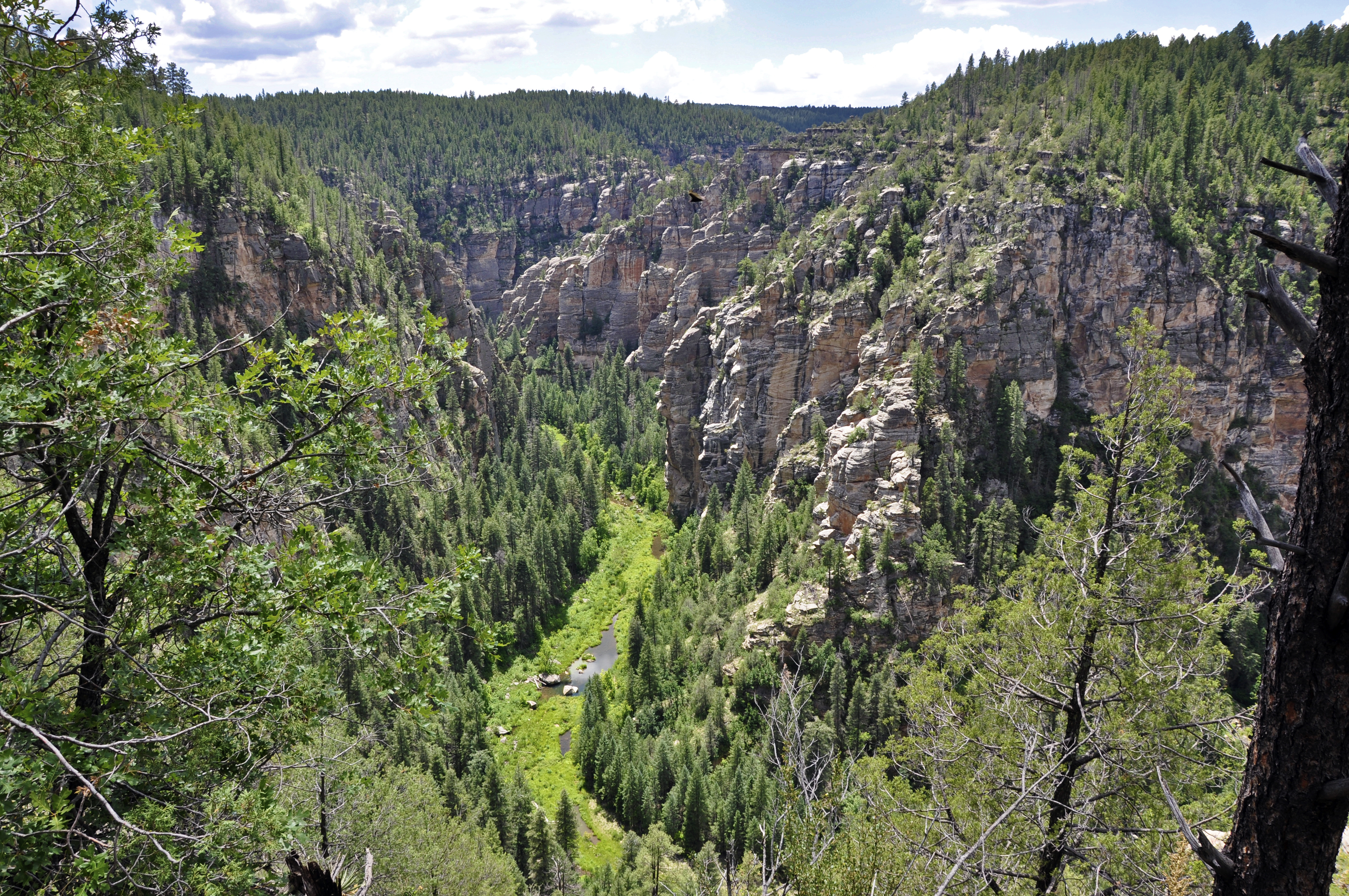
Eastern end of the West Clear Creek Wilderness

The West Clear Creek Wilderness is a 15,238-acre (6,167 ha) wilderness area in the U.S. state of Arizona. West Clear Creek is formed by the junction of Willow Creek and Clover Creek in the Mogollon Rim, which is part of the Colorado Plateau; the Mogollon Rim is the major part of the Arizona transition zone at the southwest of the Colorado Plateau of Utah-Colorado, Arizona-New Mexico. Located east of Camp Verde, the area is part of Coconino National Forest. Common activities in West Clear Creek are swimming, camping, backpacking, hunting, fishing, and hiking. A variety of plants and animals can be found year-round, along with extremely cold water.

== See also ==
- Wilderness Act
- List of U.S. Wilderness Areas
- List of Arizona Wilderness Areas
