= West Fork Trail =

Hiking trail in the Coconino National Forest

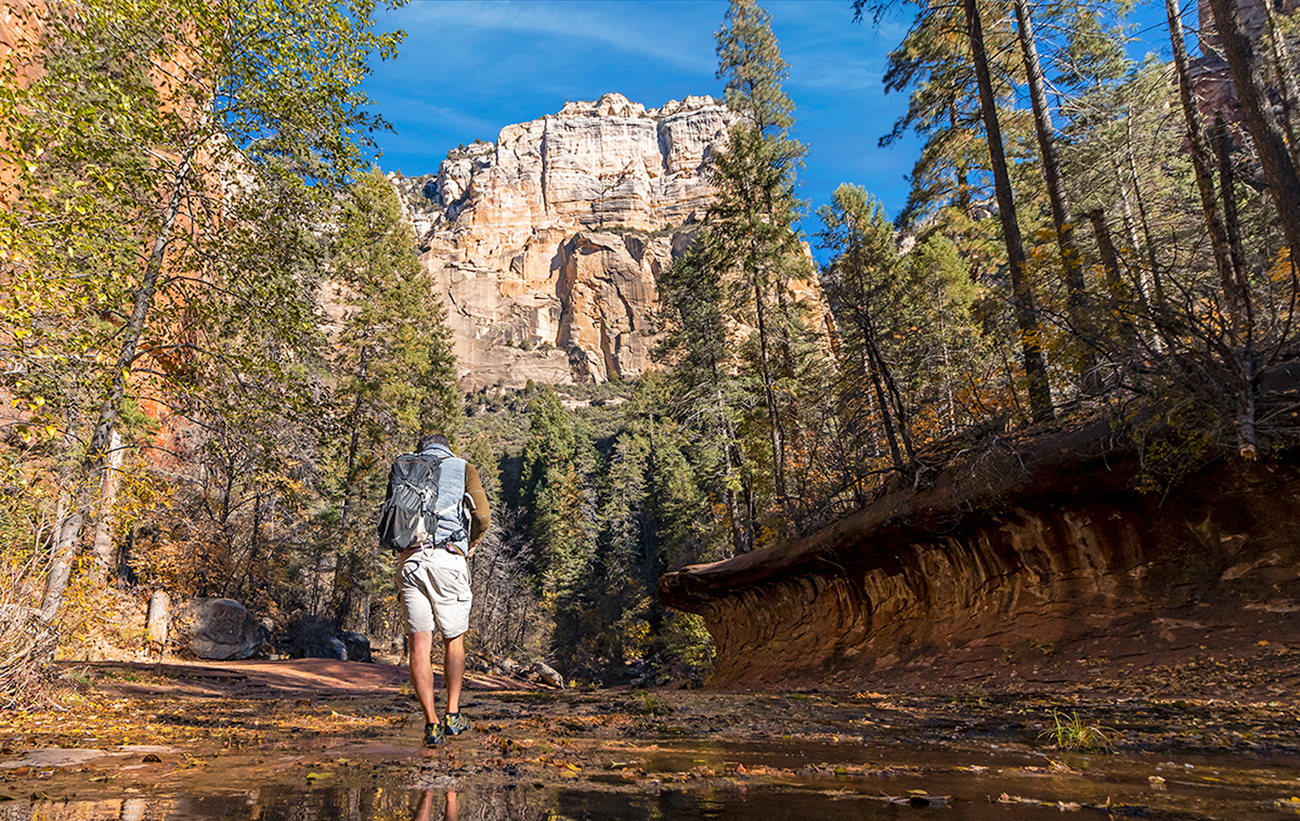
A Hiker On The West Fork Trail In Sedona, Arizona.

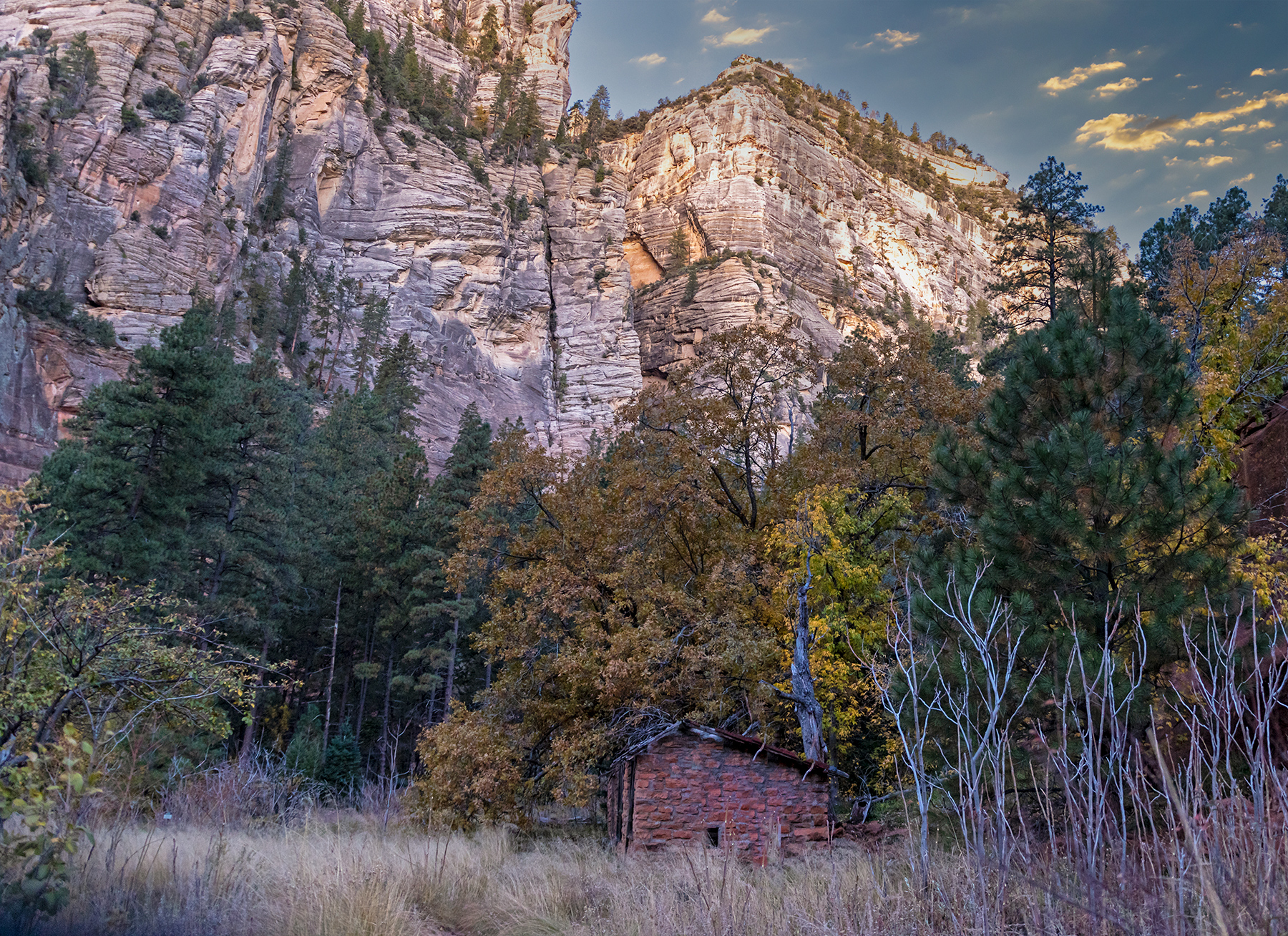
West Fork Trail Entrance

The West Fork Trail of Oak Creek Canyon has been called one of the best trails in Coconino National Forest and one of the top ten trails in the United States.

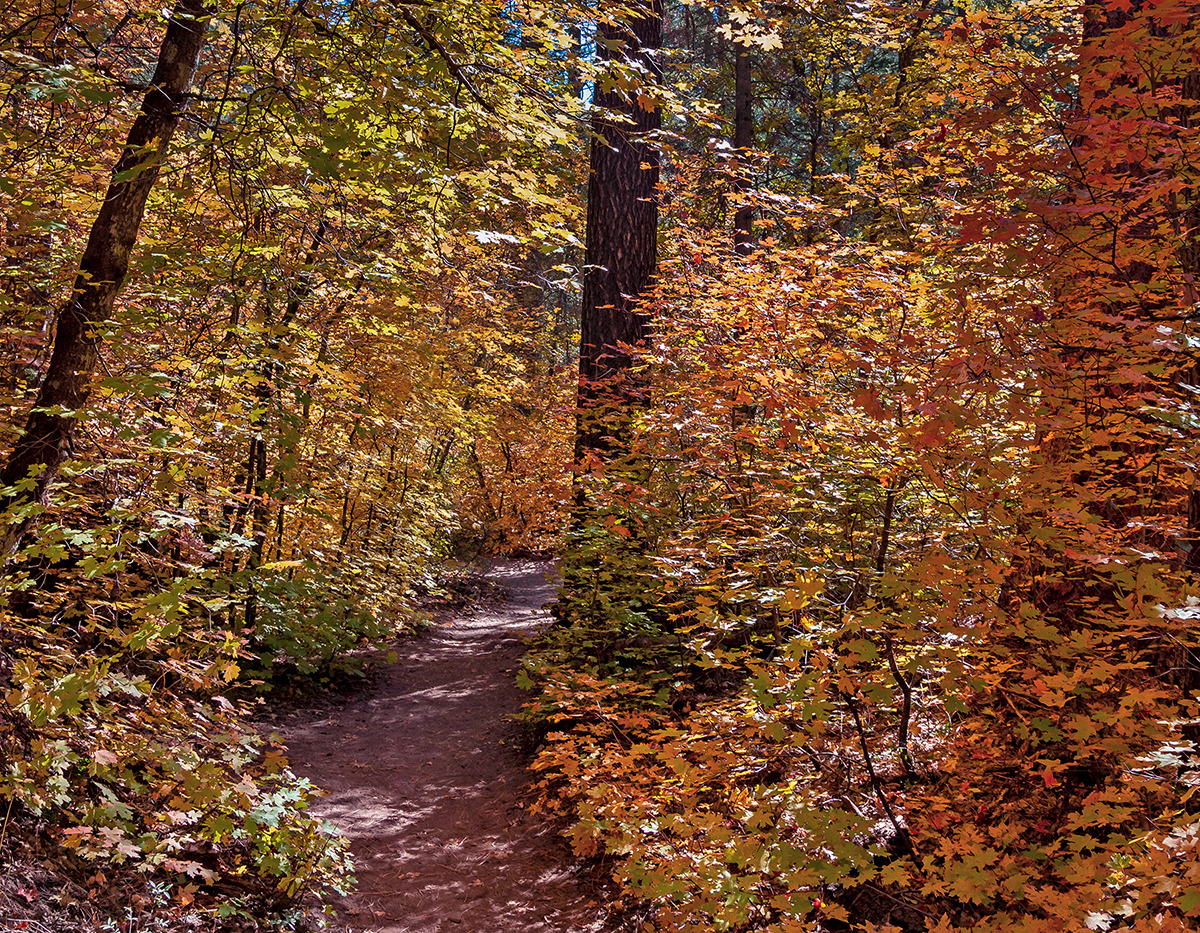
Colorful Fall Colors On West Fork Trail In Sedona
