= Oak Creek Canyon =

River gorge located in northern Arizona between the cities of Flagstaff and Sedona

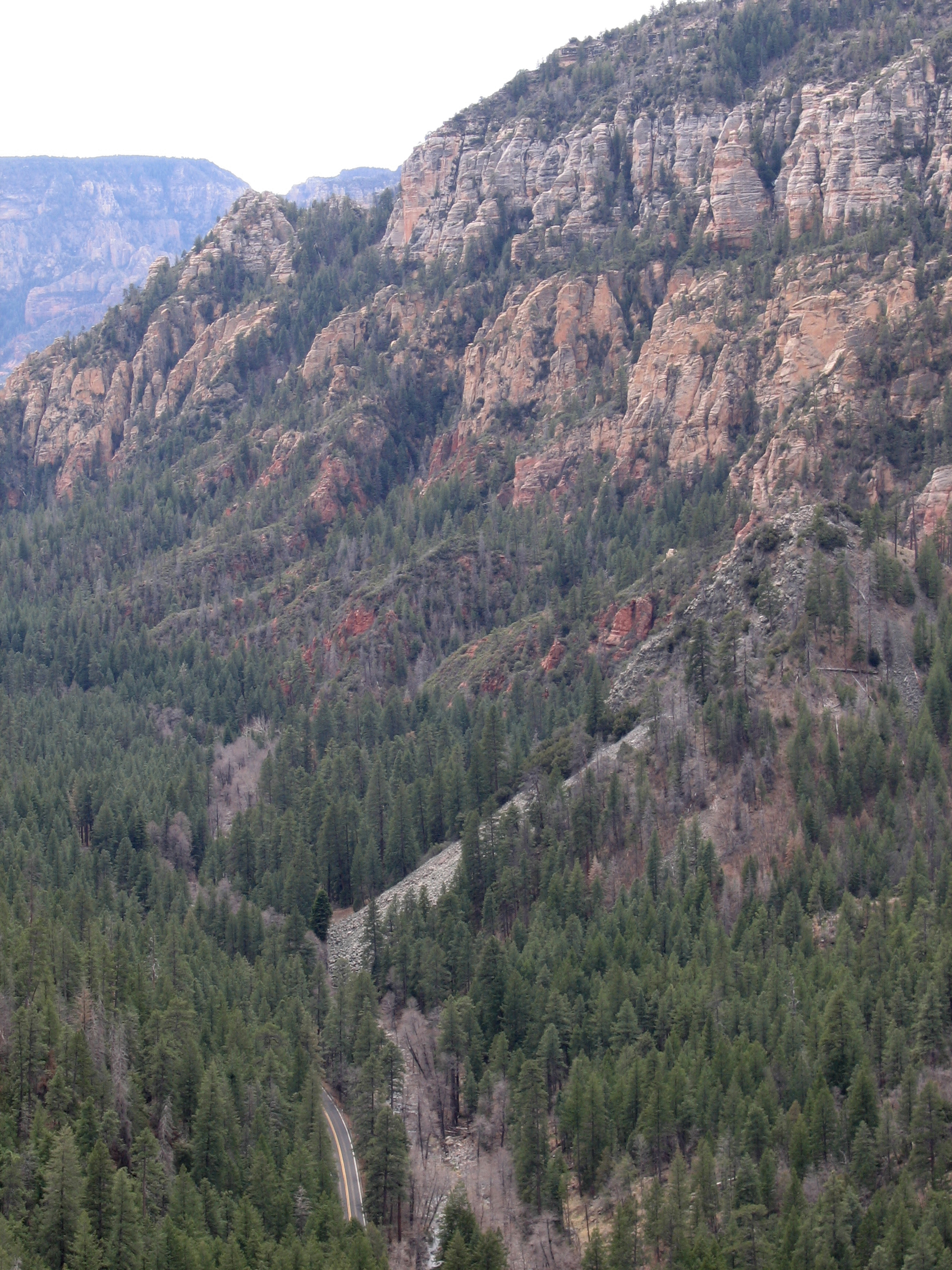
- South view, from above north terminus (Coconino Plateau); Coconino Sandstone cliffs above Hermit Formation, on west canyon wall
- Route of Oak Creek (in red) and West Fork Oak Creek (in purple)
- Length: 12 miles (19 km) North–South
- Width: 0.8 to 2.5 miles (1.3 to 4.0 km)

Geography
- Coordinates: 34°54′45″N 111°43′37″W
- Traversed by: Arizona State Route 89A
- Rivers: Oak Creek

Oak Creek Canyon is a river gorge located in northern Arizona between the cities of Flagstaff and Sedona. State Route 89A enters the canyon on its north end via a series of hairpin turns before traversing the bottom of the canyon for about 13 miles (21 km) until the highway enters the town of Sedona.

== Geography ==
Oak Creek Canyon is about 12 miles (19 km) long, ranging in width from 0.8 to 2.5 miles (1.3 to 4.0 km). The depth of the canyon ranges from 800 to 2,000 feet (240 to 610 m). However, due to the faulting that played a major role in its formation, the west rim of the canyon is 700 feet (210 m) higher than the east rim. The average elevation of the west rim is 7,200 feet (2,200 m) while the east rim elevation is 6,500 feet (2,000 m).

=== Oak Creek ===
Oak Creek, a tributary of the Verde River, flows along the bottom of the canyon, and is one of the few perennial streams in the high desert region of northern Arizona. Oak Creek is largely responsible for carving the modern Oak Creek Canyon, although movement along the Oak Creek Fault, a 30-mile (48 km) long north–south normal fault line, is thought to have played a role as well. Oak Creek has an elevation of 4,300 feet (1,300 m) just north of Sedona to 6,000 feet (1,800 m) at the northern terminus of the canyon.

Oak Creek enters more open country south of Sedona. It meanders past the communities of Page Springs and Cornville, and reaches its confluence with the Verde River about 6 miles (9.7 km) southeast of Cottonwood. In June 2006, the southern portion of the canyon, near Slide Rock State Park, was affected by a 4,300-acre (17 km^{2}) wildfire known as the "Brins Fire".

== Geology ==
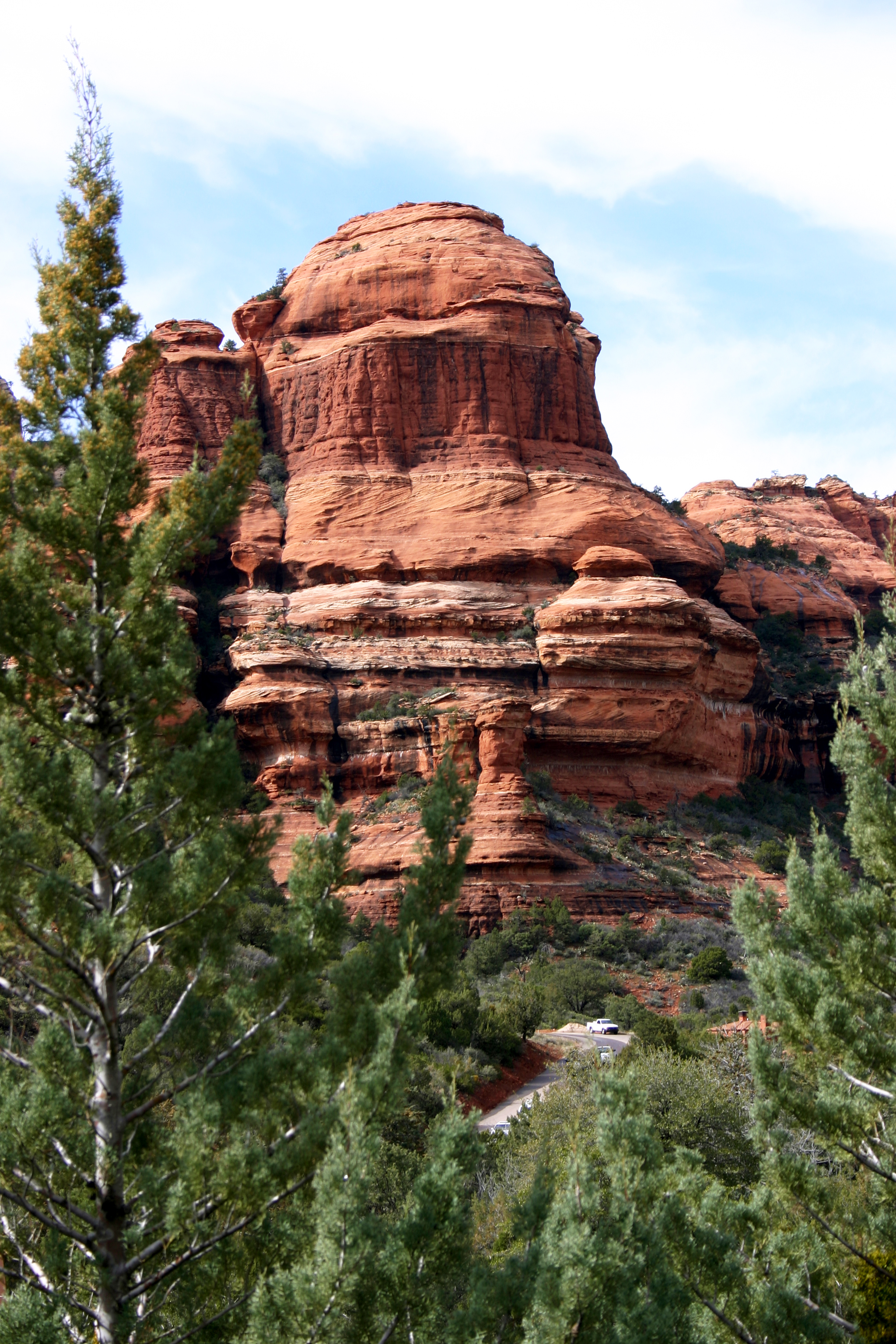
Sandstone formation in Oak Creek Canyon

Geologic evidence suggests the formation of an ancestral Oak Creek Canyon along the Oak Creek Fault about eight to ten million years ago. The ancestral Oak Creek Canyon was then filled in by gravel deposits and a series of lava flows between 6–8 million years ago during the Miocene Epoch. About this time, the Oak Creek Fault became active again and the modern Oak Creek Canyon began to develop along the fault zone as a result of the erosional action of Oak Creek. The normal, down-to-the-east motion of the Oak Creek Fault during the most recent faulting period resulted in the west rim of the canyon being about 700 feet (210 meters) higher than the east rim.

The spectacularly eroded walls of the canyon are formed mostly of Paleozoic sedimentary rocks. Exposures of the Kaibab Limestone, (the geologic formation found at the top of the Grand Canyon), and the Toroweap Formation are found only at the northern end of the canyon. The more predominant rock units exposed in the cliffs of southern Oak Creek Canyon are the buff to white colored, frequently cross-bedded Permian Coconino Sandstone and the red sandstones of the Permian Schnebly Hill Formation. Unlike all the other formations exposed in Oak Creek Canyon, the Schnebly Hill Formation is not present at the Grand Canyon. The youngest rocks exposed in the canyon are a series of basalt lava flows that form the east rim, the youngest of which is an estimated 6 million years old.

== Recreation ==
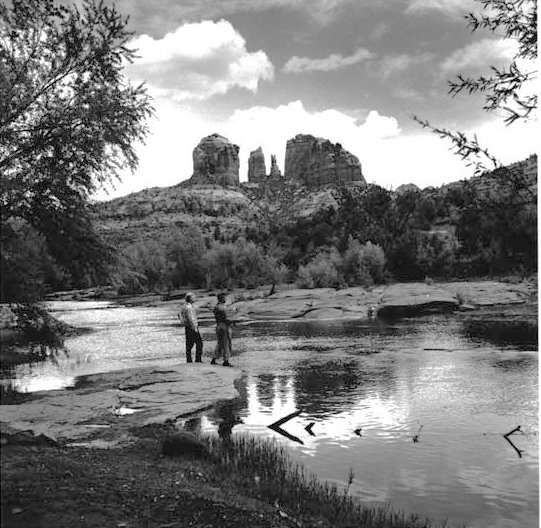
Fishing in Oak Creek, Cathedral Rock in background, 1959.

Oak Creek Canyon is located within the Coconino National Forest. Portions of the canyon have been designated federal wilderness areas as part of the Red Rock-Secret Mountain Wilderness. The United States Forest Service operates several campgrounds, picnic areas, and recreation areas within the canyon. Slide Rock State Park, home to a natural water slide along Oak Creek, is also located within Oak Creek Canyon. Other recreational activities include swimming and fishing in Oak Creek. There are 49 fishable miles along the creek where rainbow trout, brown trout, largemouth bass, smallmouth bass, catfish (channel) and catfish (flathead) can be found. Hiking the many trails leading into side canyons or up to the rim of the canyon is a popular activity for the area. West Fork Trail leads the first 3 miles (4.8 km) up the West Fork of Oak Creek, a 14-mile (23 km) long narrow side canyon, and is the most popular trail in the Coconino National Forest.

== 2014 Slide Fire ==
On May 20, 2014, at around 4 PM, a wildfire was reported just north of Slide Rock State Park. The fire was 100% contained on June 4, 2014, with 21,227 acres burned. Total personnel included over 1,230 firefighters, 50 crews, 29 engines, and 9 helicopters.

After the fire, the Sedona Fire District installed nine outdoor warning sirens throughout the canyon. They are used for situations including wildfires, flash flooding, severe weather, and other emergencies. The siren system is tested yearly, in the summer months.

== Education ==
The Oak Creek Canyon census-designated place is within the Flagstaff Unified School District. The zoned secondary schools are Mount Elden Middle School and Flagstaff High School.
