= Mount Wilson =

Mount Wilson can refer to several things:

Antarctica

- Mount Wilson (Antarctica), a mountain on the Bowman Coast of Antarctica

Australia

- Mount Wilson, New South Wales, a mountain with a small hamlet

New Zealand

- Mount Wilson (New Zealand), highest point of Polar Range

United States

- Mount Wilson (Arizona)
- Mount Wilson (California)
  - Mount Wilson Observatory
- Mount Wilson (Colorado)
- Mount Wilson, Nevada, a census-designated place in Lincoln County
- Mount Wilson (Clark County, Nevada)
- Mount Wilson (Lyon County, Nevada)
- Mount Wilson (Vermont)

== See also ==
- Wilson Mountain
- List of peaks named Mount Wilson
