= Lost Wilson Mountain =

Mountain in Yavapai County, Arizona

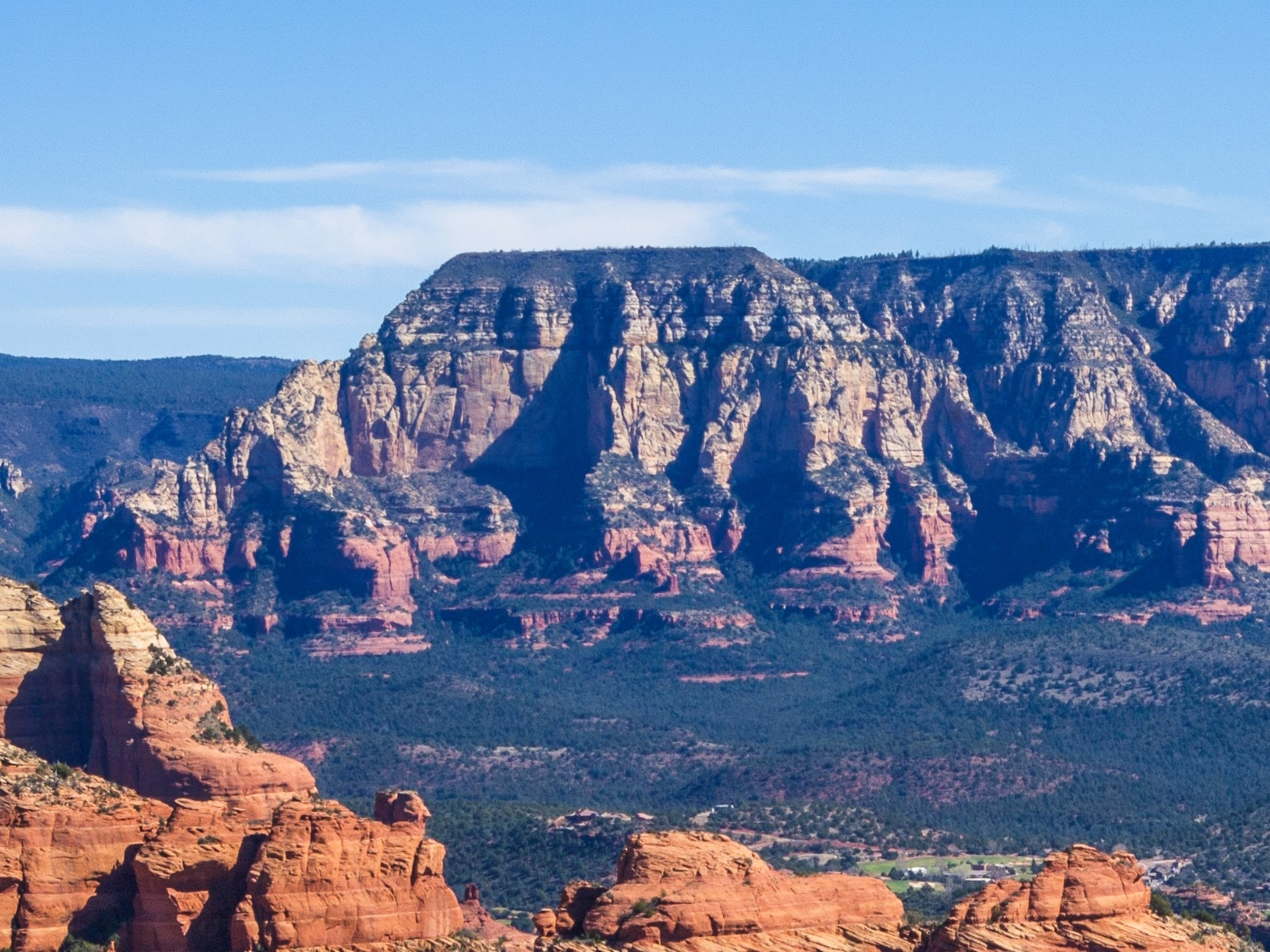
- West aspect (from Bear Mountain)

Highest point
- Elevation: 6,762 ft (2,061 m)
- Prominence: 342 ft (104 m)
- Parent peak: Wilson Mountain (7,122 ft)
- Isolation: 1.79 mi (2.88 km)
- Coordinates: 34°55′44″N 111°46′46″W

Naming
- Etymology: Richard Wilson

Geography
- Location within Arizona Location within the United States
- Country: United States
- State: Arizona
- County: Yavapai
- Protected area: Red Rock-Secret Mountain Wilderness
- Parent range: Colorado Plateau
- Topo map: USGS Wilson Mountain AZ

Geology
- Rock age: Permian
- Rock type(s): Basalt; Coconino Sandstone; Schnebly Hill Formation

Lost Wilson Mountain is a 6,762-foot-elevation (2,061-meter) summit in Yavapai County, Arizona, United States.

== Description ==
Wilson Mountain is located four miles north of Sedona in the Red Rock-Secret Mountain Wilderness, on land managed by Coconino National Forest. It is the third-highest peak in the wilderness. The summit lies within Yavapai County, whereas the eastern half of this landform is within Coconino County. Precipitation runoff from this mountain drains into the Oak Creek watershed. Topographic relief is significant as the summit rises 1,760 feet (536 meters) above Sterling Canyon in 0.6 mile (1 km). The nearest higher neighbor is Wilson Mountain, 1.79 miles (2.88 km) to the southeast. The mountain's toponym has been officially adopted by the United States Board on Geographic Names.

== Climate ==
According to the Köppen climate classification system, Lost Wilson Mountain is located in a temperate semi-arid climate zone. Climbers can expect afternoon rain and lightning from the seasonal monsoon in late July and August.

== See also ==
- List of mountain peaks of Arizona

== Gallery ==
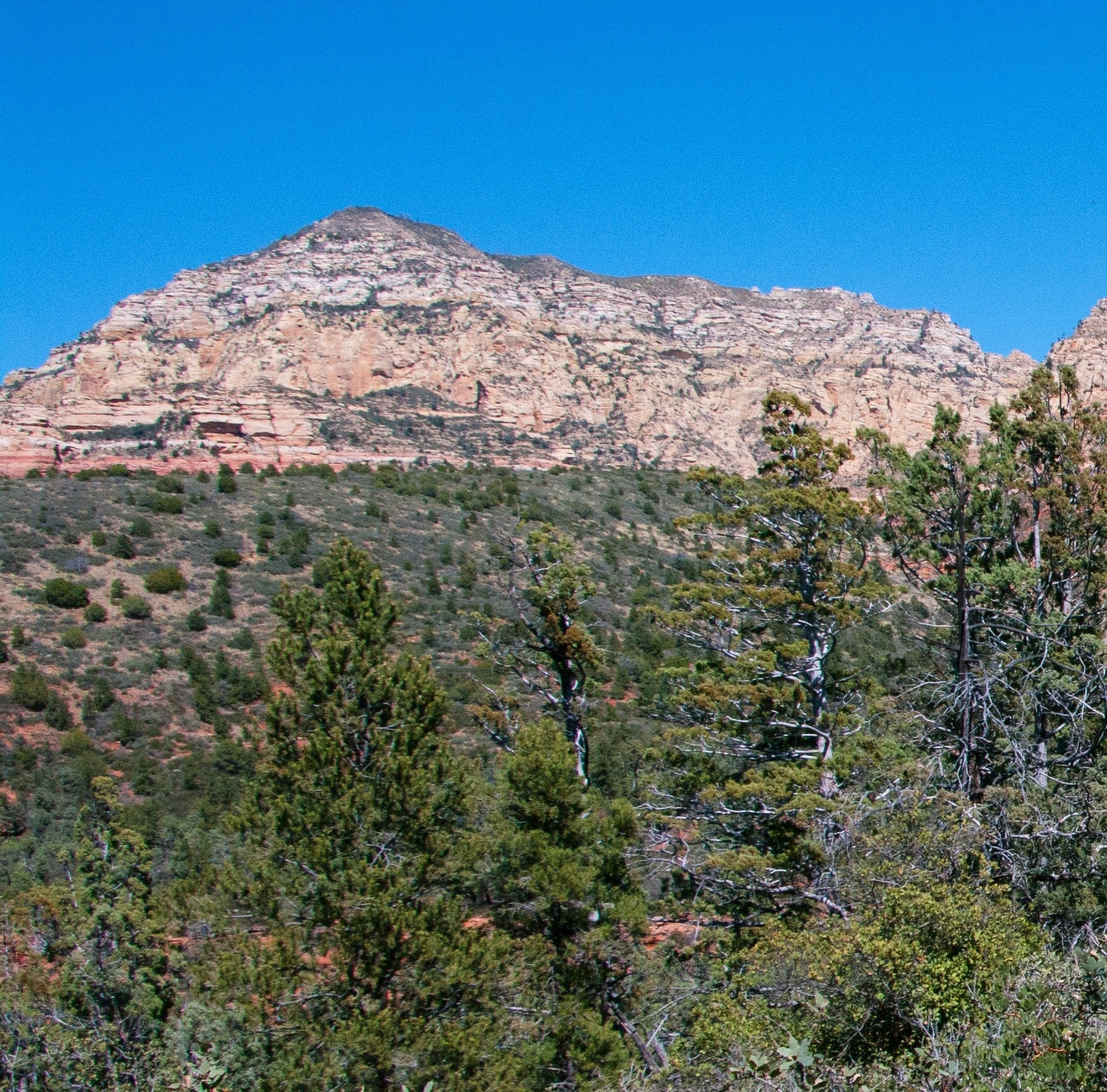
South aspect of Lost Wilson Mountain

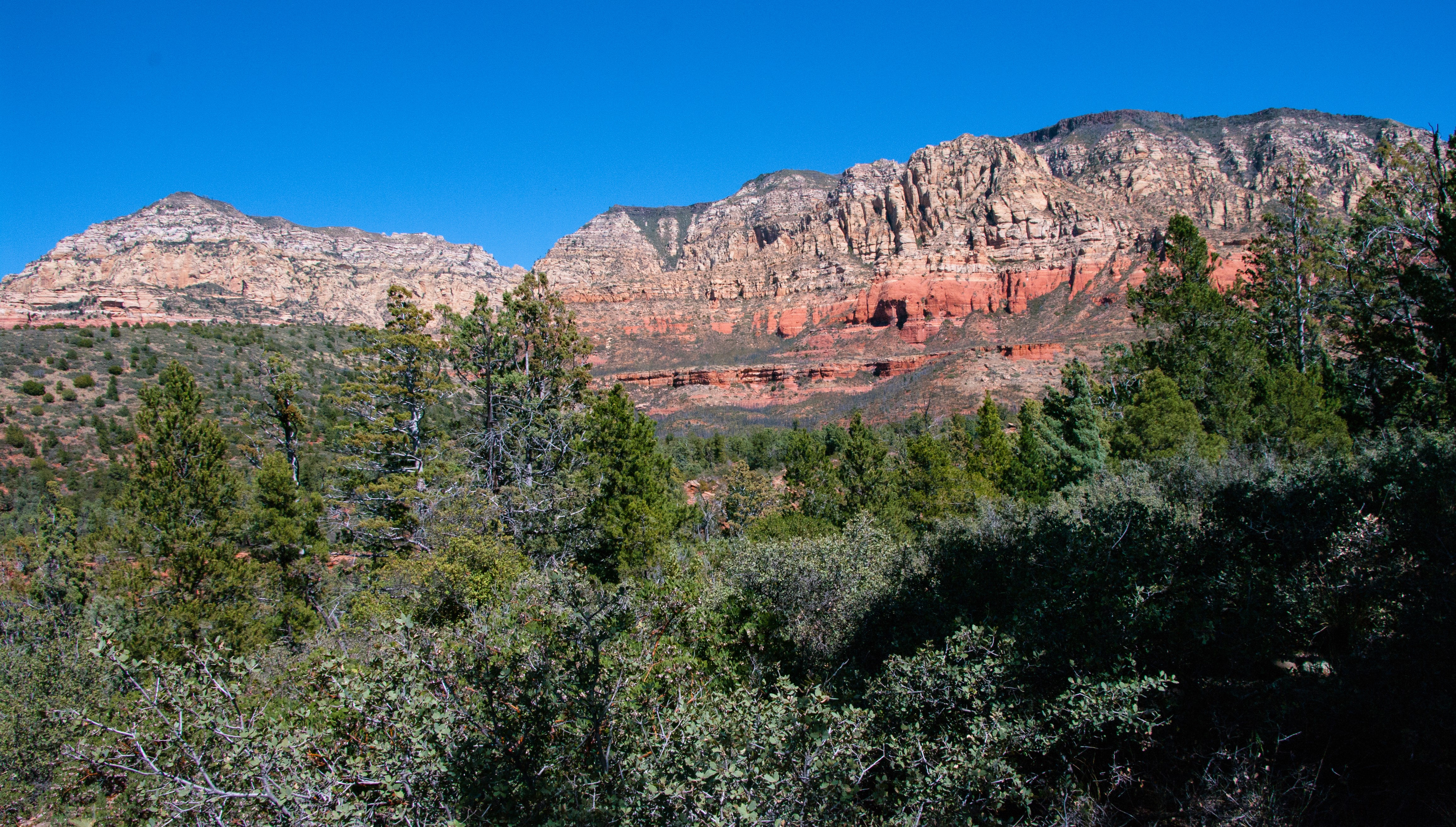
Lost Wilson Mountain to left, Wilson Mountain to right. From Brins Mesa Trail

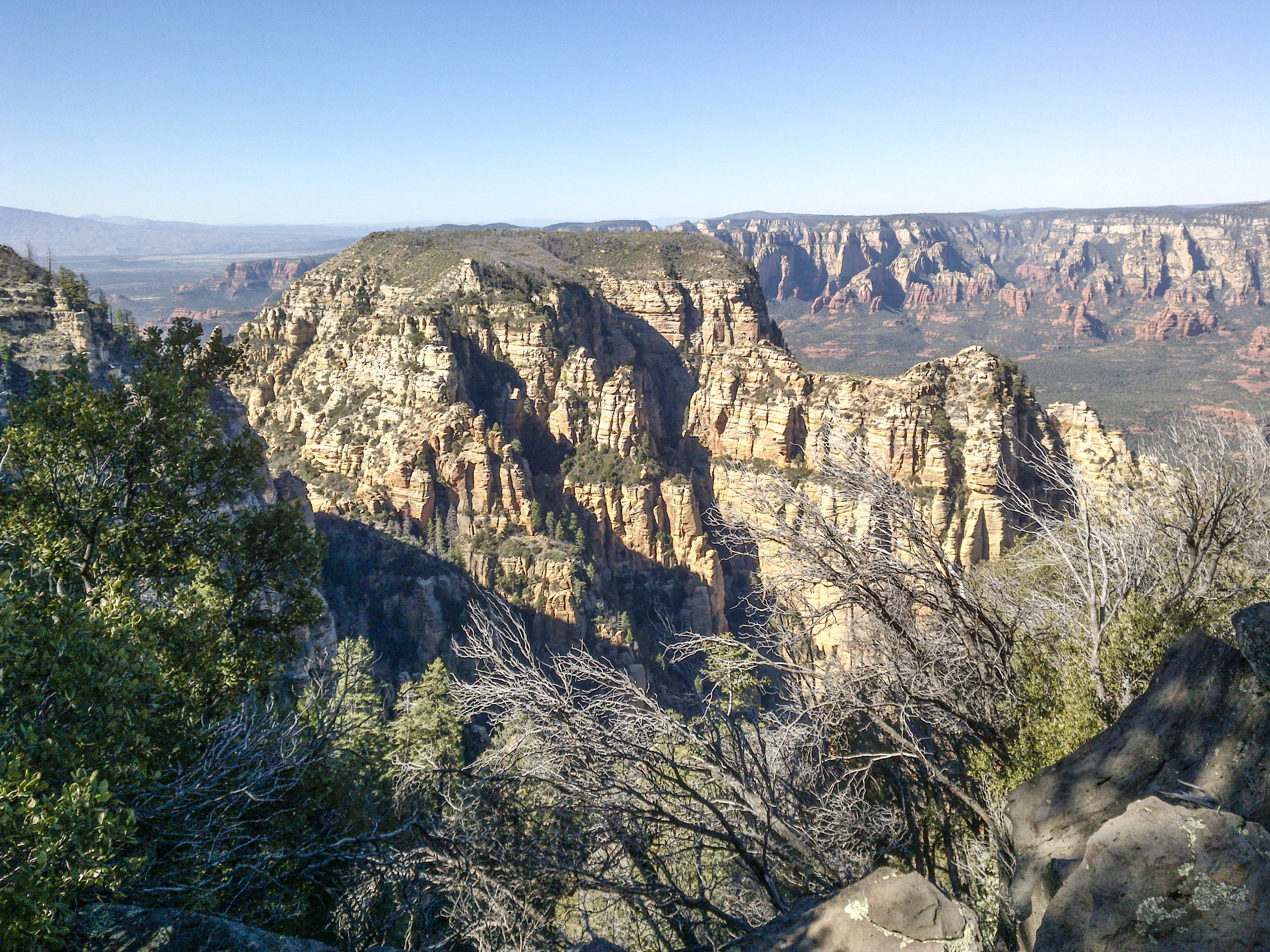
East aspect of Lost Wilson Mountain seen from the north end of Wilson Mountain

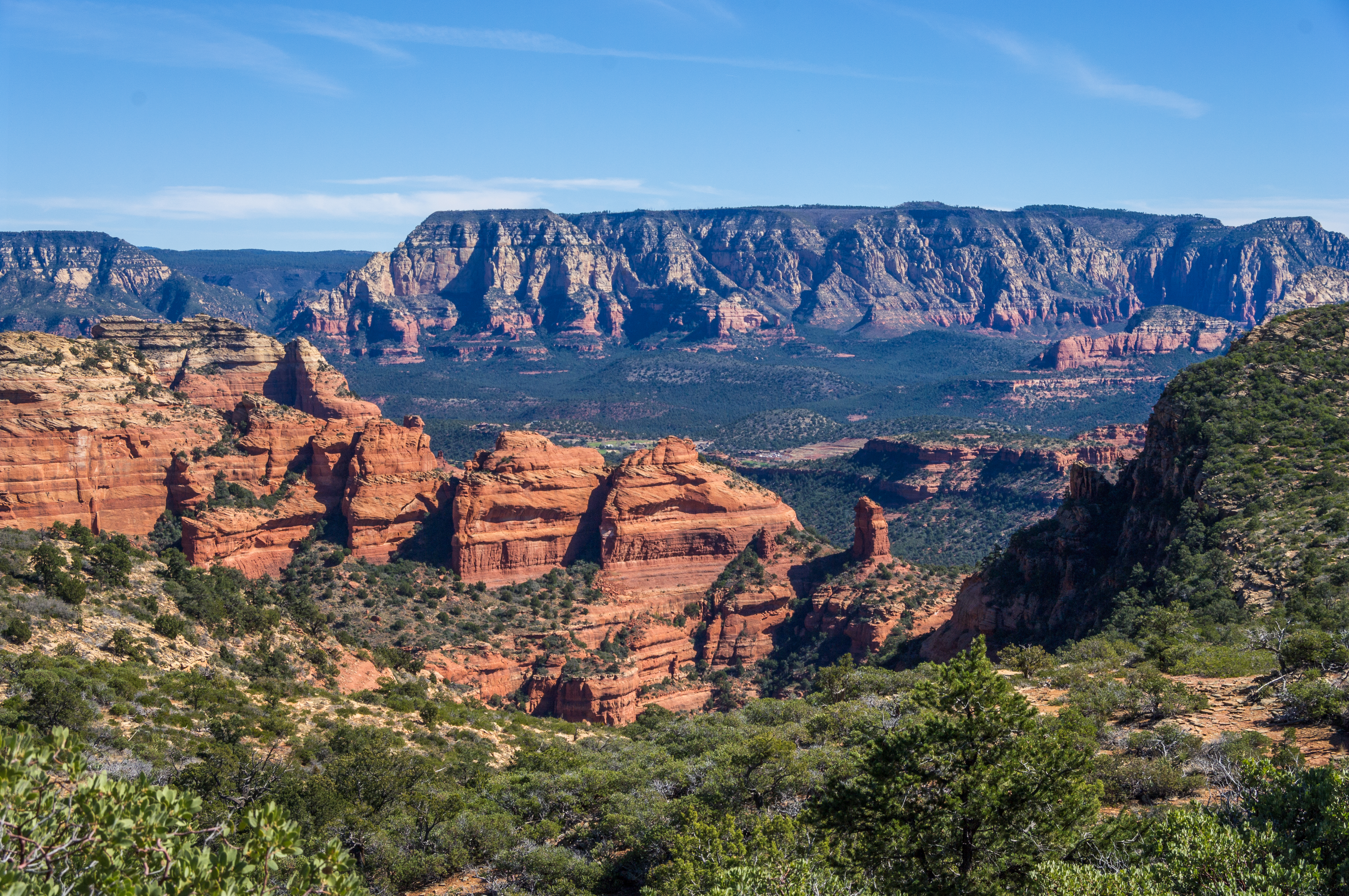
West aspect of Lost Wilson Mountain on skyline left of center
Wilson Mountain to right. View from Bear Mountain
