= List of peaks named Mount Wilson =

Several peaks are named Mount Wilson or similar:

== Antarctica ==
- Mount Wilson (Antarctica)

== Australia ==
- Wilsons Peak

== Canada ==
- Mount Wilson (Alberta)
- Mount Wilson (British Columbia)
- Mount Wilson (Yukon)

== United States ==
Name	USGS link	State	County	USGS map	Coordinates
Mount Wilson		Alaska	Prince of Wales-Outer Ketchikan (CA)	Bradfield Canal A-2	56°05′48″N 130°21′48″W
Wilson Mountain		Alabama	Calhoun	Colvin Gap	33°54′14″N 085°50′15″W
Wilson Mountain		Alabama	Morgan	Somerville	34°25′07″N 086°49′05″W
Mount Wilson		Arizona	Mohave	Mount Wilson	35°59′48″N 114°36′40″W
Wilson Mountain		Arizona	Coconino	Wilson Mountain	34°55′04″N 111°45′04″W
Wilson Mountain		Arizona	Coconino	Munds Park	34°54′45″N 111°44′56″W
Wilson Mountain		Arkansas	Pike	Lodi	34°19′27″N 093°37′58″W
Wilson Knob		Arkansas	Pulaski	Olmstead	34°57′41″N 092°09′33″W
Mount Wilson		California	Los Angeles	Mount Wilson	34°13′26″N 118°03′37″W
Willson Peak		California	Santa Clara	Gilroy Hot Springs	37°05′43″N 121°26′06″W
Wilson Butte		California	Mono	June Lake	37°46′57″N 119°01′34″W
Mount Wilson		Colorado	Dolores	Mount Wilson	37°50′21″N 107°59′27″W
Wilson Mesa		Colorado	Rio Blanco	Sleepy Cat Peak	40°12′21″N 107°31′14″W
Wilson Peak		Colorado	San Miguel	Mount Wilson	37°51′37″N 107°59′05″W
Wilson Knob		Georgia	Rabun	Rabun Bald	34°56′36″N 083°19′05″W
Wilson Mountain		Georgia	Union	Coosa Bald	34°48′09″N 083°55′33″W
Wilson Mountain		Georgia	Fannin	Noontootla	34°42′29″N 084°14′46″W
Willson Peak		Idaho	Valley	Profile Gap	45°03′12″N 115°26′48″W
Wilson Peak		Idaho	Gem	Tripod Peak	44°27′27″N 116°09′33″W
Wilson Peak		Idaho	Boise	Sunset Mountain	43°58′01″N 115°45′02″W
Wilson Mountain		Idaho	Lemhi	Hoodoo Meadows	45°05′17″N 114°37′30″W
Wilson Butte		Idaho	Jerome	Star Lake	42°47′06″N 114°12′51″W
Wilson Mountain		Idaho	Benewah	Santa	47°09′08″N 116°24′31″W
Wilson Peak		Idaho	Owyhee	Wilson Peak	43°18′16″N 116°44′40″W
Wilson Mountain		Kentucky	Estill	Leighton	37°36′58″N 083°58′14″W
Wilson Mountain		Massachusetts	Norfolk	Newton	42°15′25″N 071°12′05″W
Wilson Peak		Montana	Gallatin	Gallatin Peak	45°19′37″N 111°19′32″W
Wilson Butte		Montana	Cascade	Antelope Butte	47°23′58″N 111°22′55″W
Mount Wilson		Nevada	Clark	Blue Diamond	36°05′37″N 115°29′01″W
Mount Wilson		Nevada	Lincoln	Schoolmarm Basin	38°15′00″N 114°23′36″W
Mount Wilson		Nevada	Lyon	Wilson Canyon	38°51′02″N 119°13′08″W
Mount Wilson		Nevada	Nye	Northumberland Pass	38°55′52″N 116°50′31″W
Wilson Mesa		New Mexico	Colfax	Johnson Park	36°51′05″N 104°10′38″W
Wilson Mesa		New Mexico	Colfax	Abreu Canyon	36°38′14″N 105°06′59″W
Wilson Mountain		New Mexico	Grant	Brushy Mountain	32°47′50″N 108°41′30″W
Wilson Mountain		New Mexico	Grant	Wilson Mountain	33°09′17″N 108°54′49″W
Wilson Mountain		New York	St. Lawrence	Brother Ponds	44°18′23″N 074°51′14″W
Wilson Knob		North Carolina	Mitchell	Micaville	35°59′14″N 082°07′31″W
Wilson Mountain		North Carolina	Ashe	Baldwin Gap	36°23′53″N 081°43′46″W
Mount Wilson		Oregon	Wasco	Mount Wilson	45°04′01″N 121°39′25″W
Wilson Mountain		Tennessee	Overton	Hilham	36°26′03″N 085°24′34″W
Wilson Mountain		Tennessee	Johnson	Zionville	36°22′16″N 081°43′44″W
Wilson Knob		Tennessee	Greene	Flag Pond	36°04′42″N 082°34′37″W
Wilson Knob		Tennessee	McMinn	Englewood	35°24′20″N 084°26′42″W
Wilson Mountain		Texas	Coke	Dead Indian Mountain	32°02′59″N 100°45′03″W
Wilson Mesa		Utah	San Juan	The Rincon	37°16′08″N 110°46′04″W
Wilson Mesa		Utah	Grand	Warner Lake	38°32′33″N 109°22′11″W
Wilson Peak		Utah	Garfield	Wilson Peak	37°41′21″N 112°18′15″W
Mount Wilson		Vermont	Addison	Lincoln	44°00′17″N 072°55′35″W
Wilson Mountain		Virginia	Alleghany	Clifton Forge	37°48′45″N 079°47′31″W
Wilson Mountain		Virginia	Rockbridge	Arnold Valley	37°34′35″N 079°34′07″W
Wilson Mountain		Virginia	Bath	Burnsville	38°08′25″N 079°44′09″W
Wilson Knob		Virginia	Carroll	Lambsburg	36°36′48″N 080°52′26″W
Wilson Butte		Washington	Douglas	Alameda Flat	48°01′08″N 119°08′19″W
Mount Wilson		Washington	Asotin	Jim Creek Butte	45°59′53″N 116°58′39″W
Wilson Mountain		Washington	Stevens	Goddards Peak	48°22′08″N 117°35′22″W
Wilson Knob		West Virginia	Upshur	Roanoke	38°52′53″N 080°22′54″W
Mount Woodrow Wilson		Wyoming	Sublette/Fremont	Gannett Peak	43°10′01″N 109°39′06″W
