= Wilson Mountain =

Wilson Mountain may refer to:

- Wilson Mountain (Virginia)
- Wilson Mountain (Arizona)
- Wilson Mountain Reservation, Massachusetts

== See also ==
- Mount Wilson
