= Capitol Butte =

Summit in Arizona, United States

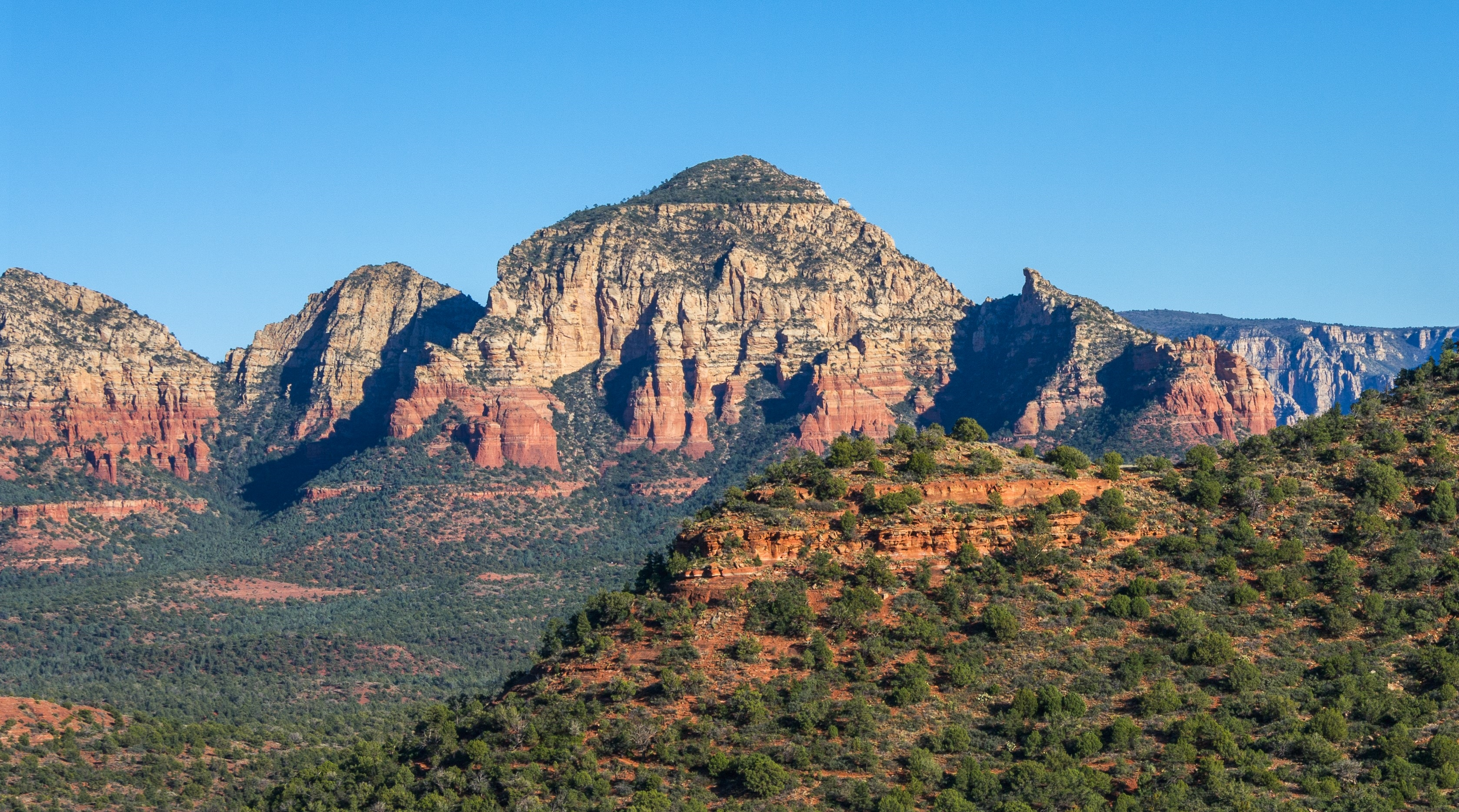
- West aspect

Highest point
- Elevation: 6,355 ft (1,937 m)
- Prominence: 1,455 ft (443 m)
- Parent peak: Wilson Mountain (7,122 ft)
- Isolation: 3.36 mi (5.41 km)
- Coordinates: 34°53′10″N 111°48′26″W

Geography
- Location within Arizona Location within the United States
- Country: United States
- State: Arizona
- County: Yavapai
- Protected area: Red Rock-Secret Mountain Wilderness
- Parent range: Colorado Plateau
- Topo map: USGS Wilson Mountain

Geology
- Rock age: Permian
- Rock type(s): Coconino Sandstone; Schnebly Hill Formation

Climbing
- Easiest route: (class 3) Southwest ridge

Capitol Butte is a 6,355-foot-elevation (1,937-meter) summit in Yavapai County, Arizona, United States.

== Description ==
Capitol Butte is located three miles immediately northwest of Sedona in the Red Rock-Secret Mountain Wilderness, on land managed by Coconino National Forest. The nearest higher neighbor is Lost Wilson Mountain 3.1 miles (5 km) to the north-northeast. Precipitation runoff from this feature drains to Oak Creek which is part of the Verde River watershed. Topographic relief is significant as the summit rises over 1,700 feet (518 meters) above West Sedona in 0.6 mile (1 km). Capitol Butte is composed of light-colored Coconino Sandstone overlaying reddish Schnebly Hill Formation.

== Etymology ==
The landform's toponym was officially adopted in 1971 by the United States Board on Geographic Names. It is unknown how the butte came to be called "Capitol," however it does resemble a capitol dome in appearance. Previous variant names for the landform included Capital Butte, Gray Mountain, Grayback Mountain, and Judge Oteys Tombstone. Locals call it "Thunder Mountain."

== Climate ==
According to the Köppen climate classification system, Capitol Butte is located in a temperate semi-arid climate zone. Climbers can expect afternoon rain and lightning from the seasonal monsoon in late July and August.

== See also ==
- List of mountain peaks of Arizona

== Gallery ==
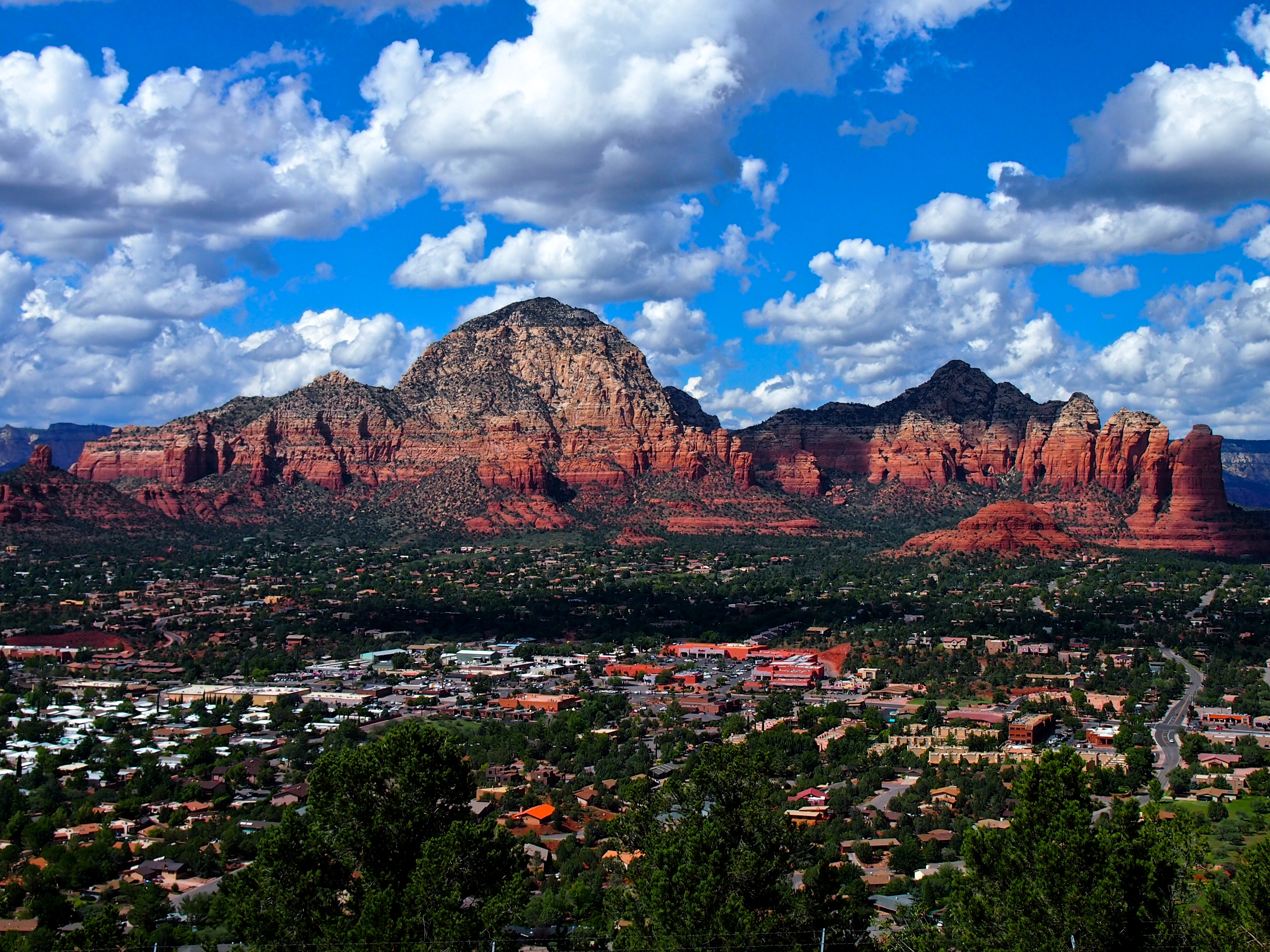
South aspect of Capitol Butte rises above Sedona

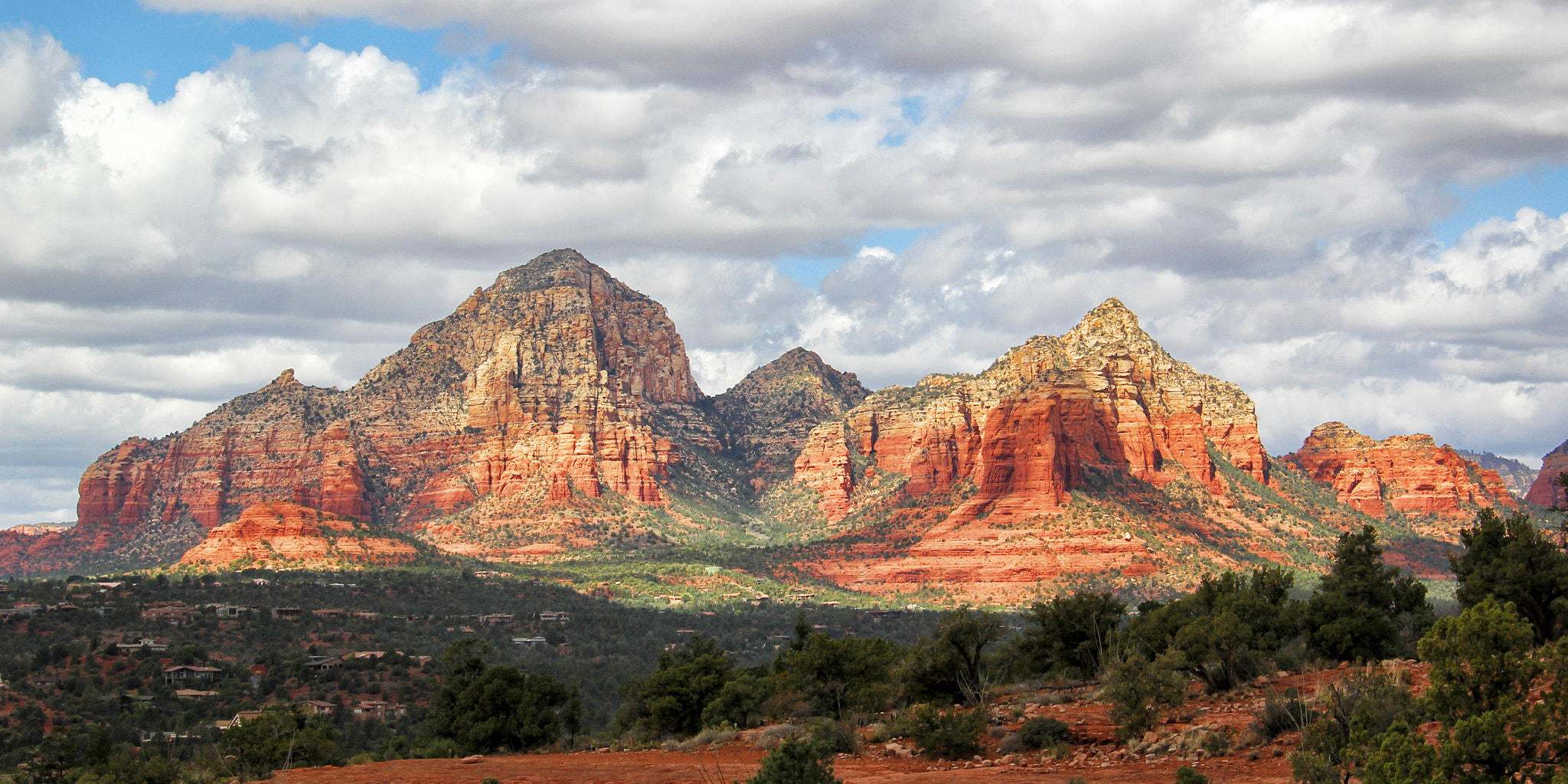
Capitol Butte to left

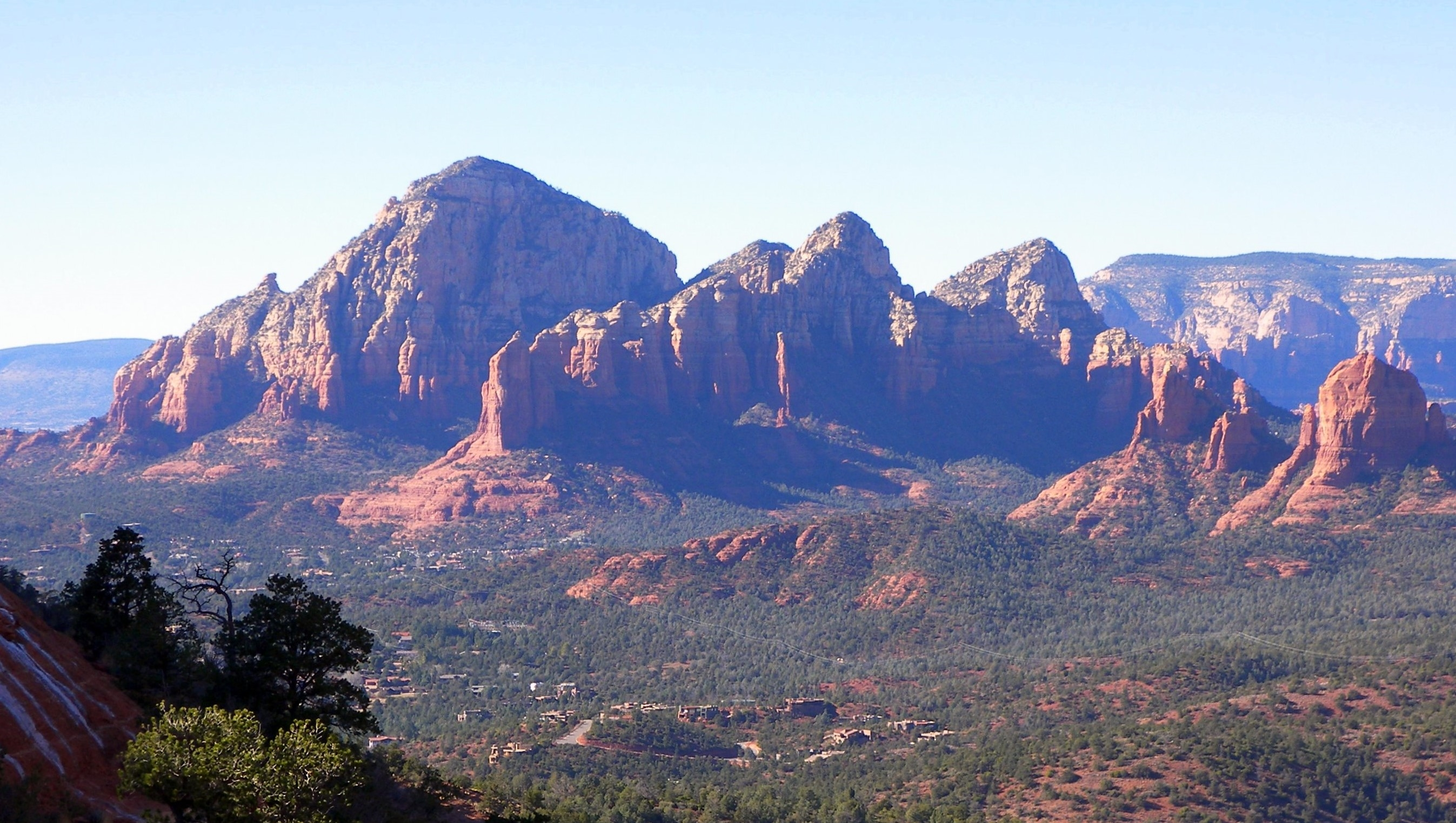
East aspect (left)

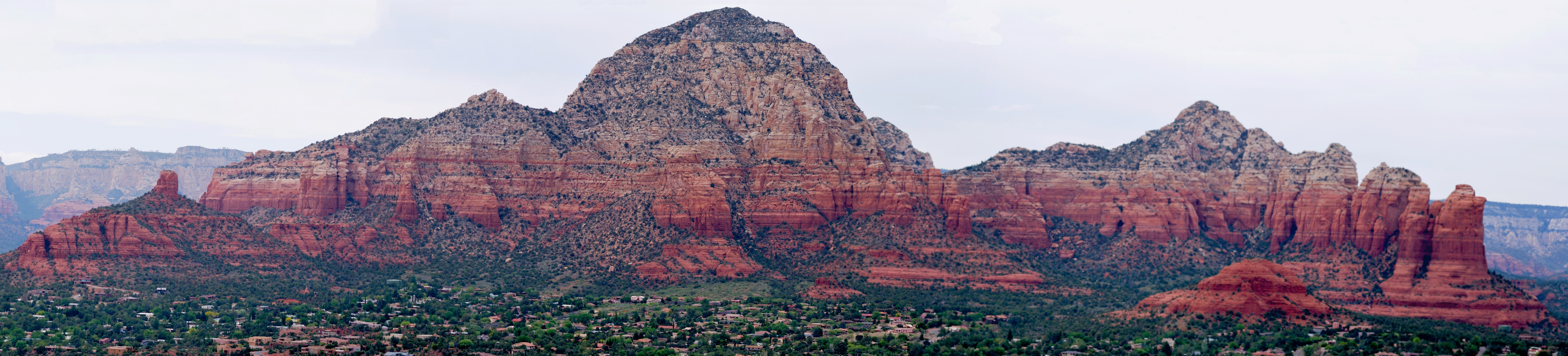
South aspect
