= Bear Mountain (Loy Butte, Arizona) =

Mountain in Arizona, United States

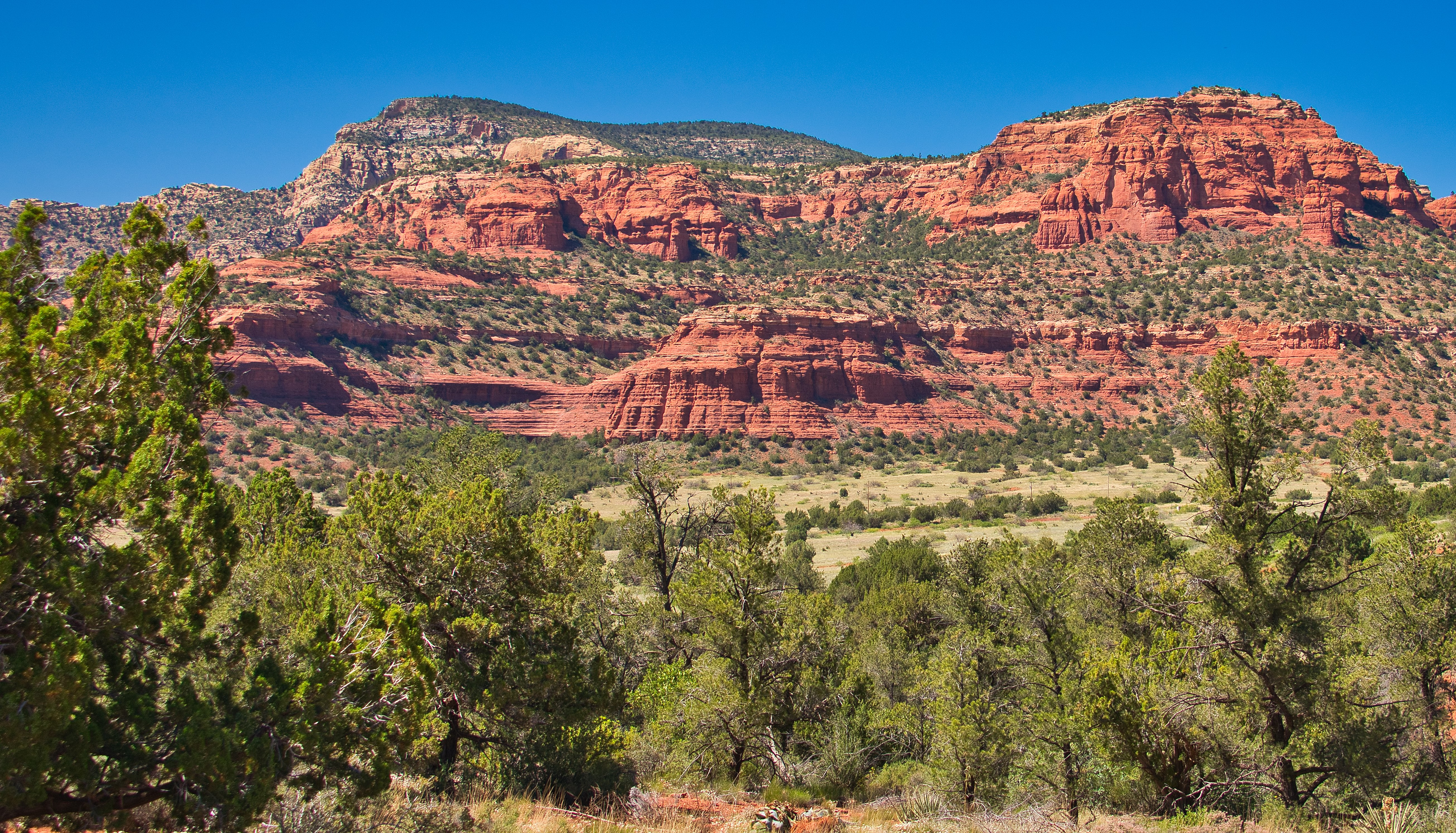
- South aspect

Highest point
- Elevation: 6,572 ft (2,003 m)
- Prominence: 702 ft (214 m)
- Parent peak: Lost Mountain (6,583 ft)
- Isolation: 1.12 mi (1.80 km)
- Coordinates: 34°55′47″N 111°53′01″W

Geography
- Location within Arizona Location within the United States
- Country: United States
- State: Arizona
- County: Yavapai
- Protected area: Red Rock-Secret Mountain Wilderness
- Parent range: Colorado Plateau
- Topo map(s): USGS Loy Butte & Wilson Mountain

Geology
- Rock age: Permian
- Rock type(s): Coconino Sandstone; Schnebly Hill Formation

Climbing
- Easiest route: (class 2) hiking

Bear Mountain is a 6,572-foot-elevation (2,003-meter) summit in Yavapai County, Arizona, United States.

== Description ==
Bear Mountain is located eight miles northwest of Sedona in the Red Rock-Secret Mountain Wilderness, on land managed by Coconino National Forest. The nearest higher neighbor is Lost Mountain one mile (1.6 km) to the north. Precipitation runoff from this mountain drains into the Oak Creek watershed. Topographic relief is significant as the summit rises 1,570 feet (479 meters) above Boynton Canyon in one-half mile (0.8 km). Bear Mountain is composed of light-colored Coconino Sandstone overlaying reddish Schnebly Hill Formation. The mountain's toponym has been officially adopted by the United States Board on Geographic Names.

== Climate ==
According to the Köppen climate classification system, Bear Mountain is located in a temperate semi-arid climate zone. Hikers can expect afternoon rain and lightning from the seasonal monsoon in late July and August.

== See also ==
- List of mountain peaks of Arizona

== Gallery ==
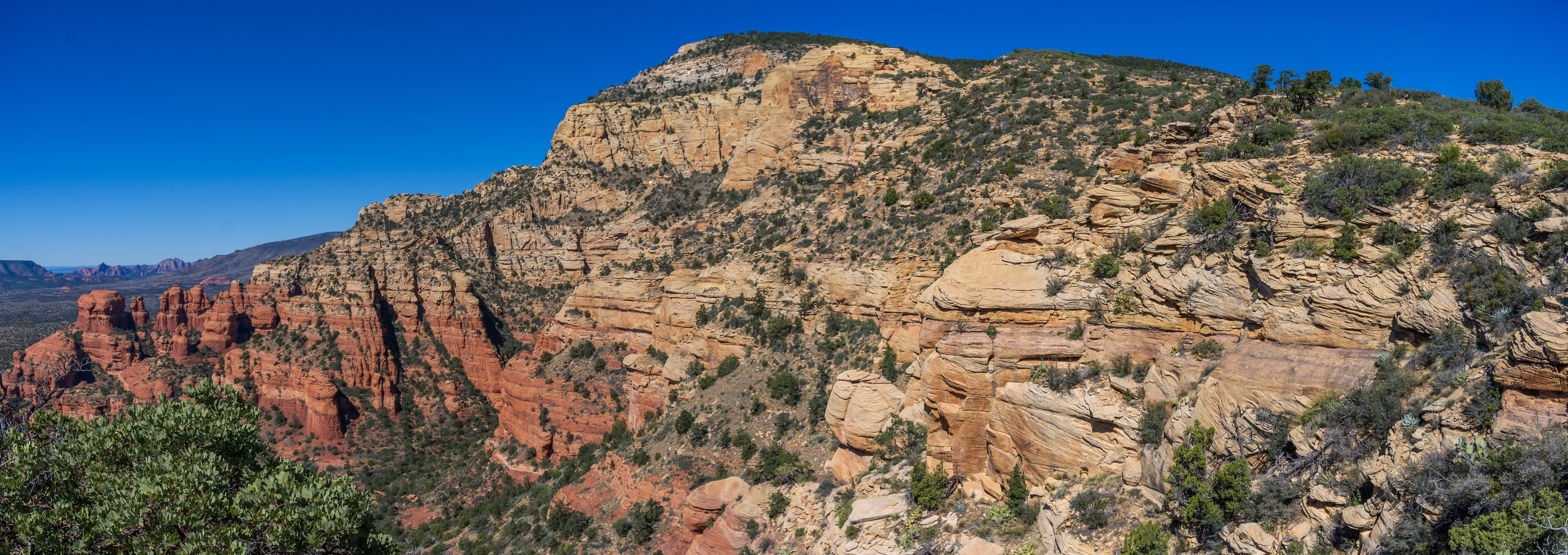
View of Bear Mountain on the approach to the final ascent. Cream-colored Coconino Sandstone overlaying reddish Schnebly Hill Formation.

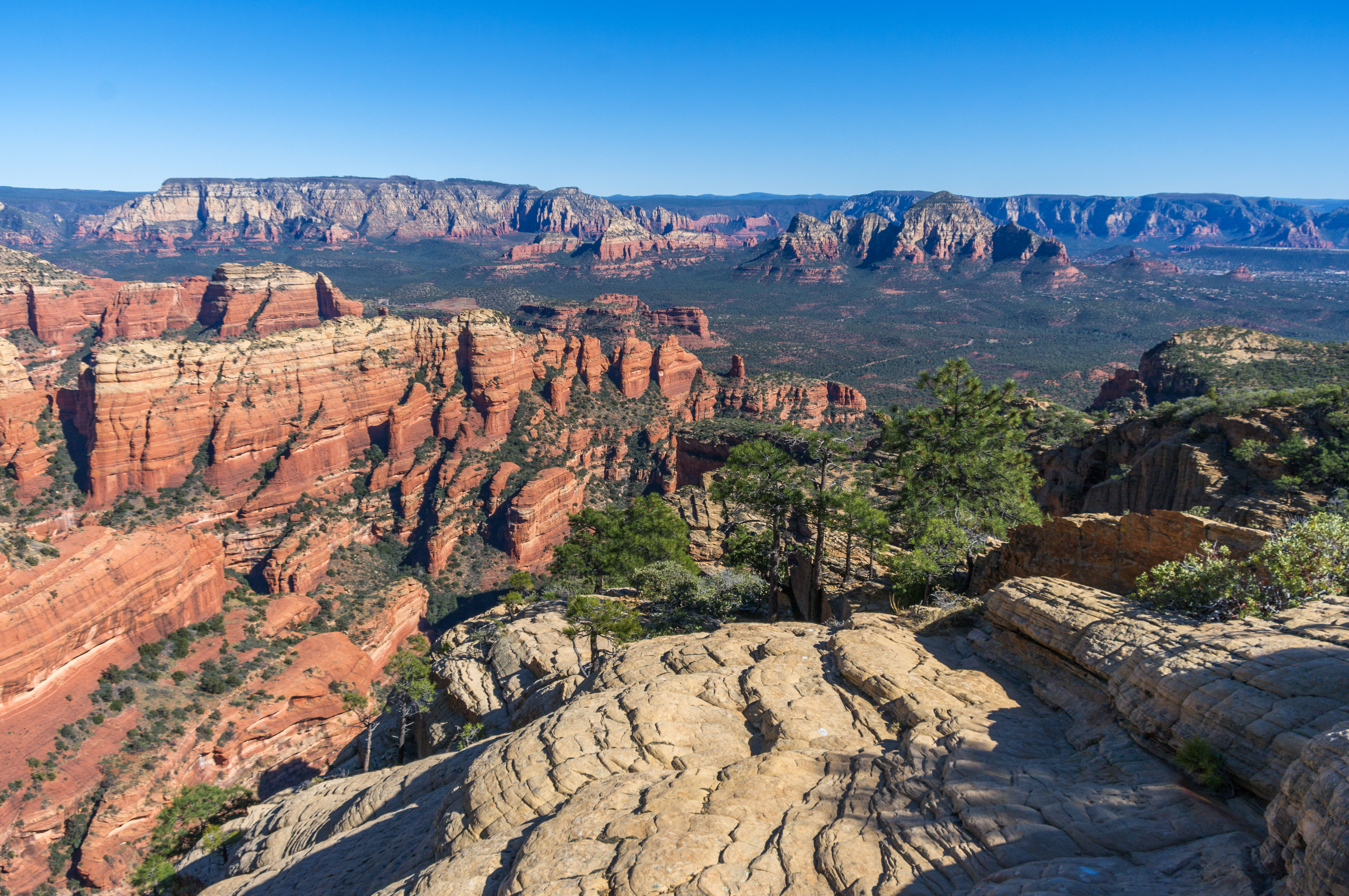
View from Bear Mountain looking to Wilson Mountain and Capitol Butte.

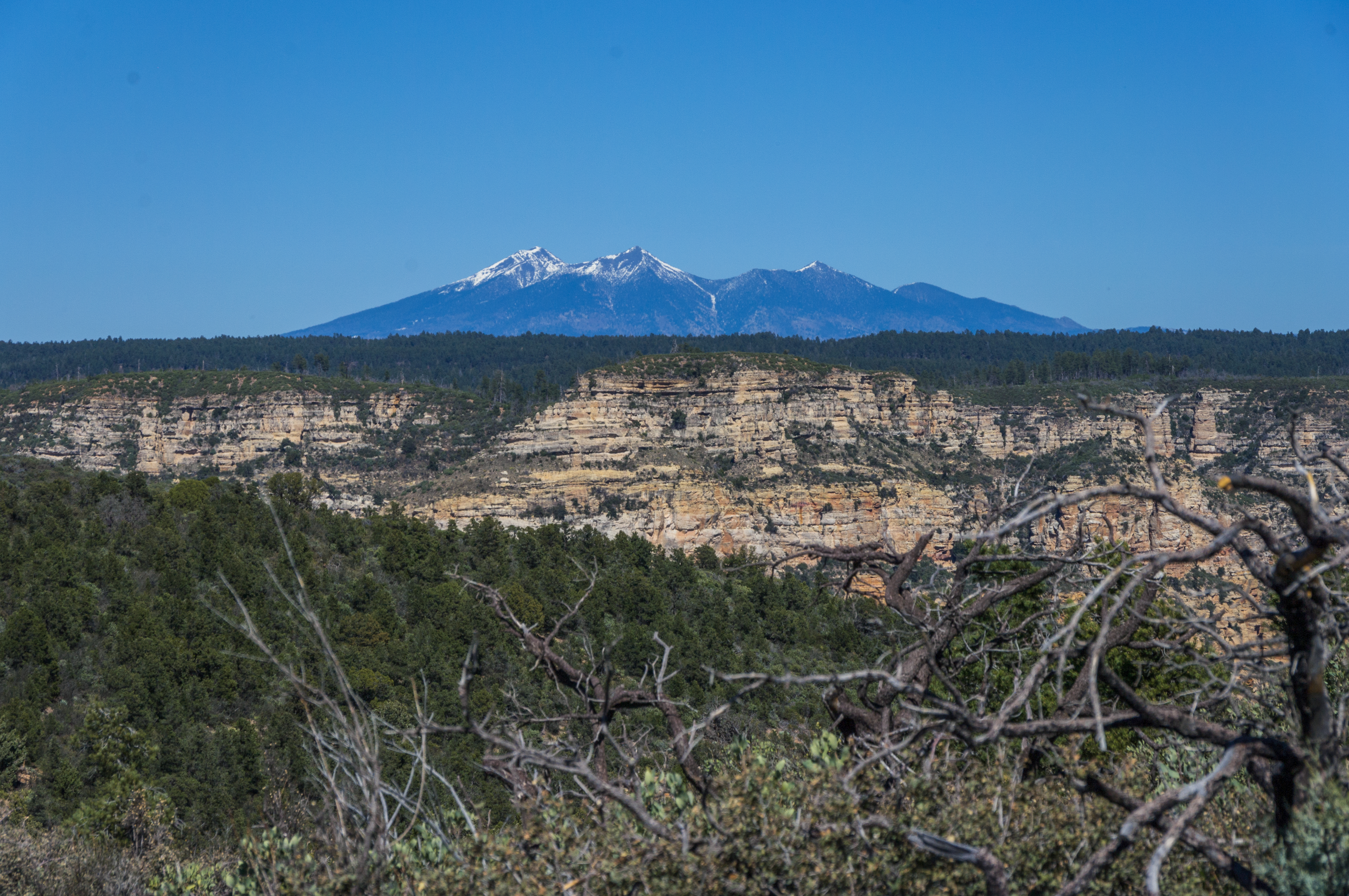
View of the San Francisco Peaks from Bear Mountain.

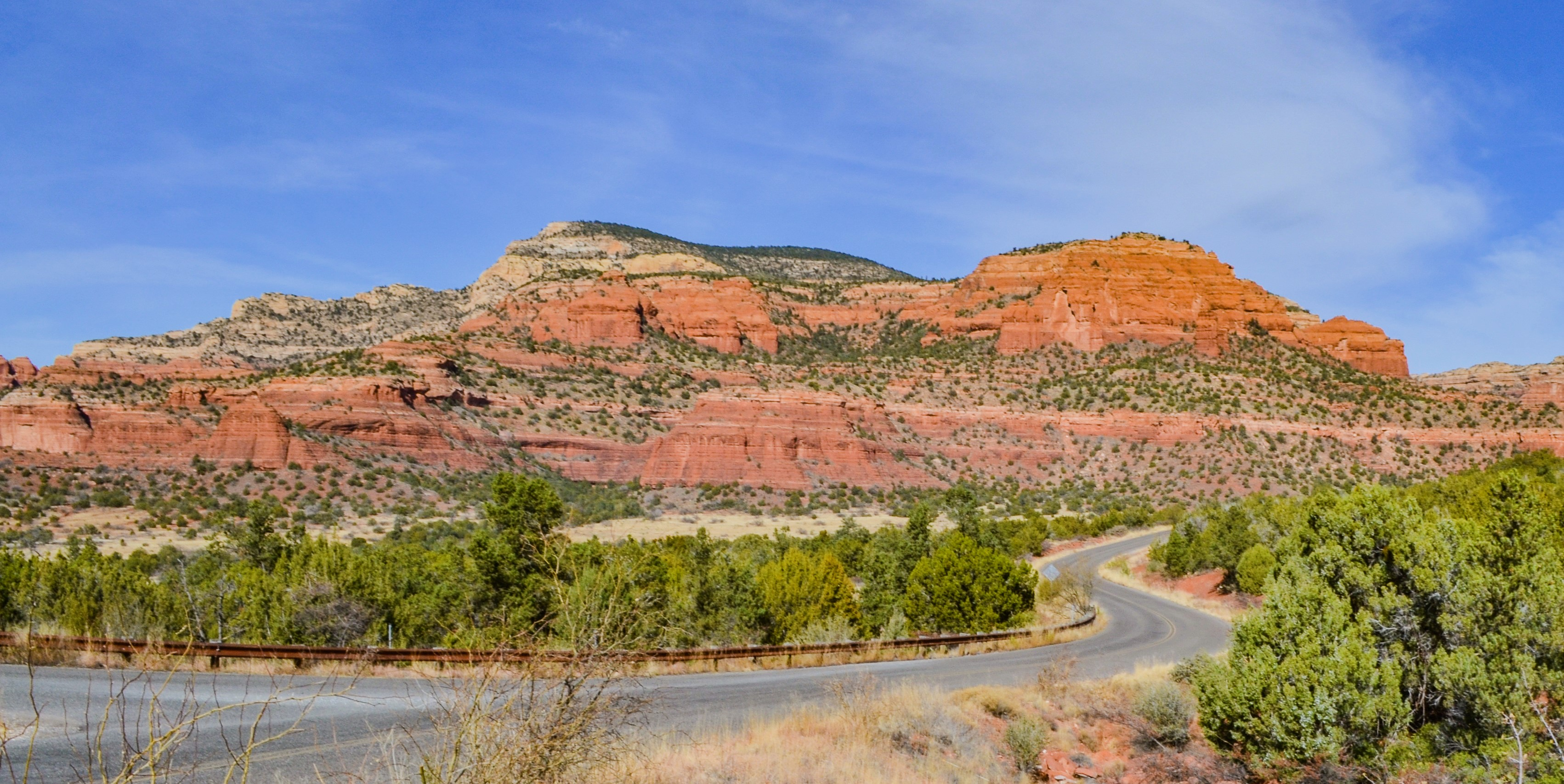
Bear Mountain
