= Mount Wilson Wilderness =

Protected area in Mohave County, Arizona

- IUCN category Ib (wilderness area)
- Location within Arizona
- Location: Mohave County, Arizona, United States
- Nearest city: Boulder City, NV
- Coordinates: 35.961253°N 114.578729°W
- Area: 23,900 acres (9,700 ha)
- Established: 1990
- Governing body: U.S. Bureau of Land Management

Mount Wilson Wilderness is a 23,900-acre wilderness area located within the Black Mountains in Mohave County Arizona, directly bordering Lake Mead National Recreation Area. It is located 19 miles south of the Hoover Dam and can be accessed by dirt roads originating from Temple Bar Road. It is managed by the Bureau of Land Management Kingman Field Office.

The protected area consists of Wilson Ridge and its highest peak, the 5,445-foot Mount Wilson. The mountain range sustains a diverse ecosystem of desert flora and fauna and sits along steep, 3,000-foot cliffs, providing views of Lake Mead and the surrounding badlands and mountains.
