= East Pocket Knob =

Mountain in Arizona, United States

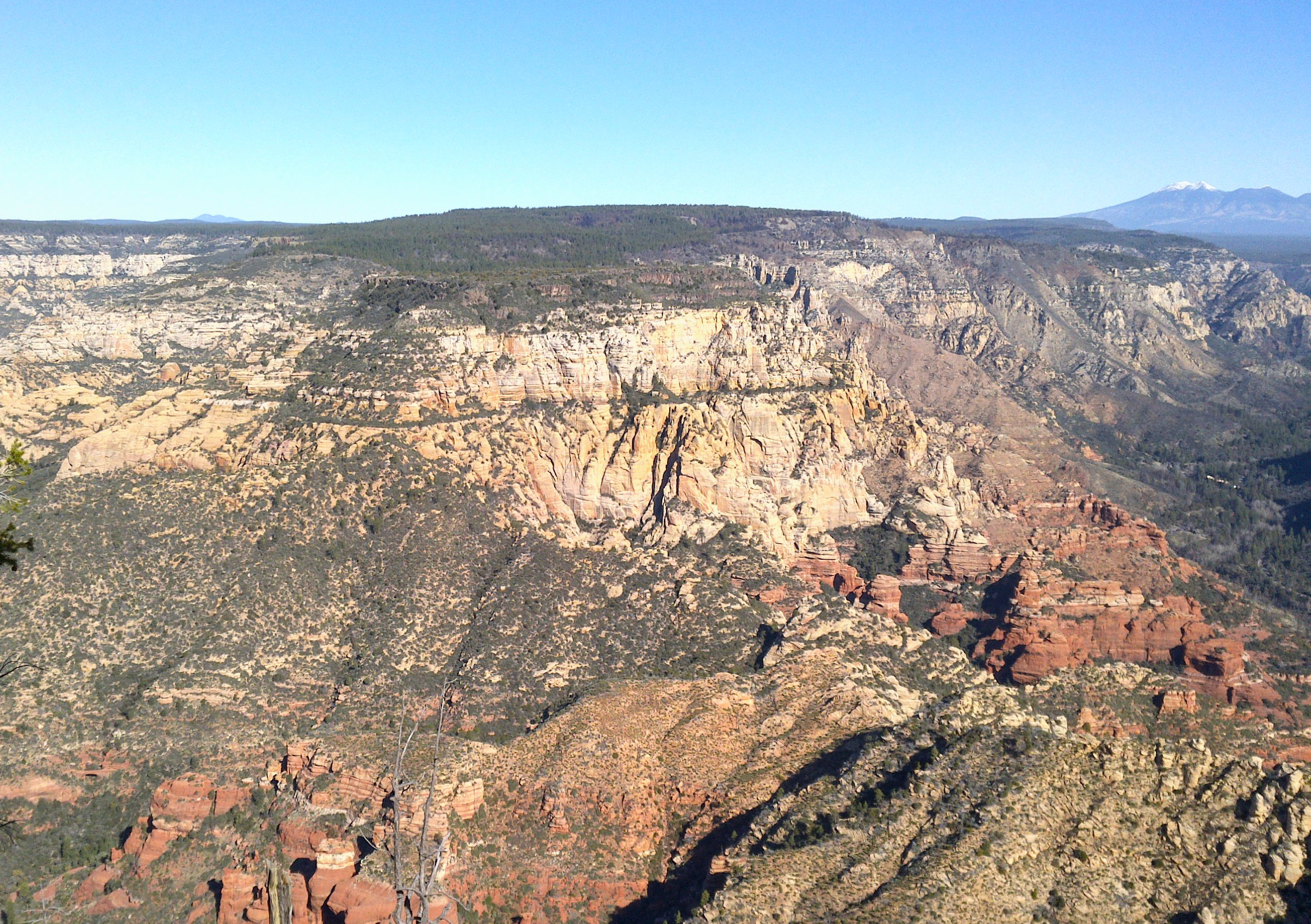
- South aspect, from Wilson Mountain

Highest point
- Elevation: 7,196 ft (2,193 m)
- Prominence: 401 ft (122 m)
- Parent peak: Turkey Butte (7,374 ft)
- Isolation: 5.28 mi (8.50 km)
- Coordinates: 34°58′32″N 111°46′07″W

Geography
- Location within Arizona Location within the United States
- Country: United States
- State: Arizona
- County: Coconino
- Protected area: Red Rock-Secret Mountain Wilderness
- Parent range: Colorado Plateau
- Topo map: USGS Wilson Mountain

Geology
- Rock age: Permian
- Rock type(s): Basalt; Coconino Sandstone

Climbing
- Easiest route: Trail

East Pocket Knob is a 7,196-foot-elevation (2,193-meter) summit in Coconino County, Arizona, United States.

== Description ==
East Pocket Knob is located 7.5 miles (12.1 km) north of Sedona in the Red Rock-Secret Mountain Wilderness, on land managed by Coconino National Forest. It is the highest point in the wilderness. Precipitation runoff from this mountain drains to Oak Creek which is part of the Verde River watershed. Topographic relief is significant as the summit rises 2,000 feet (610 meters) above Oak Creek Canyon in one mile (1.6 km). The nearest higher neighbor is Smith Butte, five miles (8 km) to the northeast. East Pocket Knob is composed of a layer of dark-gray basalt overlaying light-colored Coconino Sandstone. Hiking the strenuous A. B. Young Trail to the fire lookout tower at the summit covers two miles (one-way) with 33 switchbacks and 1,950 feet of elevation gain. The trail was originally built by C.S. (Bear) Howard in the 1880s to access grazing pastures on the plateau, then it was reconstructed in the 1930s by the Civilian Conservation Corps as supervised by A.B. Young. The lookout was built in 1943 and is one of only two wooden fire lookouts remaining in Arizona. The landform's toponym has been officially adopted by the United States Board on Geographic Names. "Pocket" was a term that pioneers used for an isolated area of land surrounded by cliffs on three sides.

== Climate ==
According to the Köppen climate classification system, East Pocket Knob is located in a temperate semi-arid climate zone. Hikers can expect afternoon rain and lightning from the seasonal monsoon in late July and August. Spring and autumn offer the most favorable weather for hiking the trail to East Pocket Knob.

== See also ==
- List of mountain peaks of Arizona
