= Mount Wilson (Lyon County, Nevada) =

Mountain in Lyon County, Nevada, United States

Coordinates: 38°51′02″N 119°13′12″W

Mount Wilson is a summit in the U.S. state of Nevada. The elevation is 6,745 feet (2,056 m).

Mount Wilson was named after David Wilson.
