= Red Rock-Secret Mountain Wilderness =

Protected area in the Coconino National Forest

- IUCN category Ib (wilderness area)
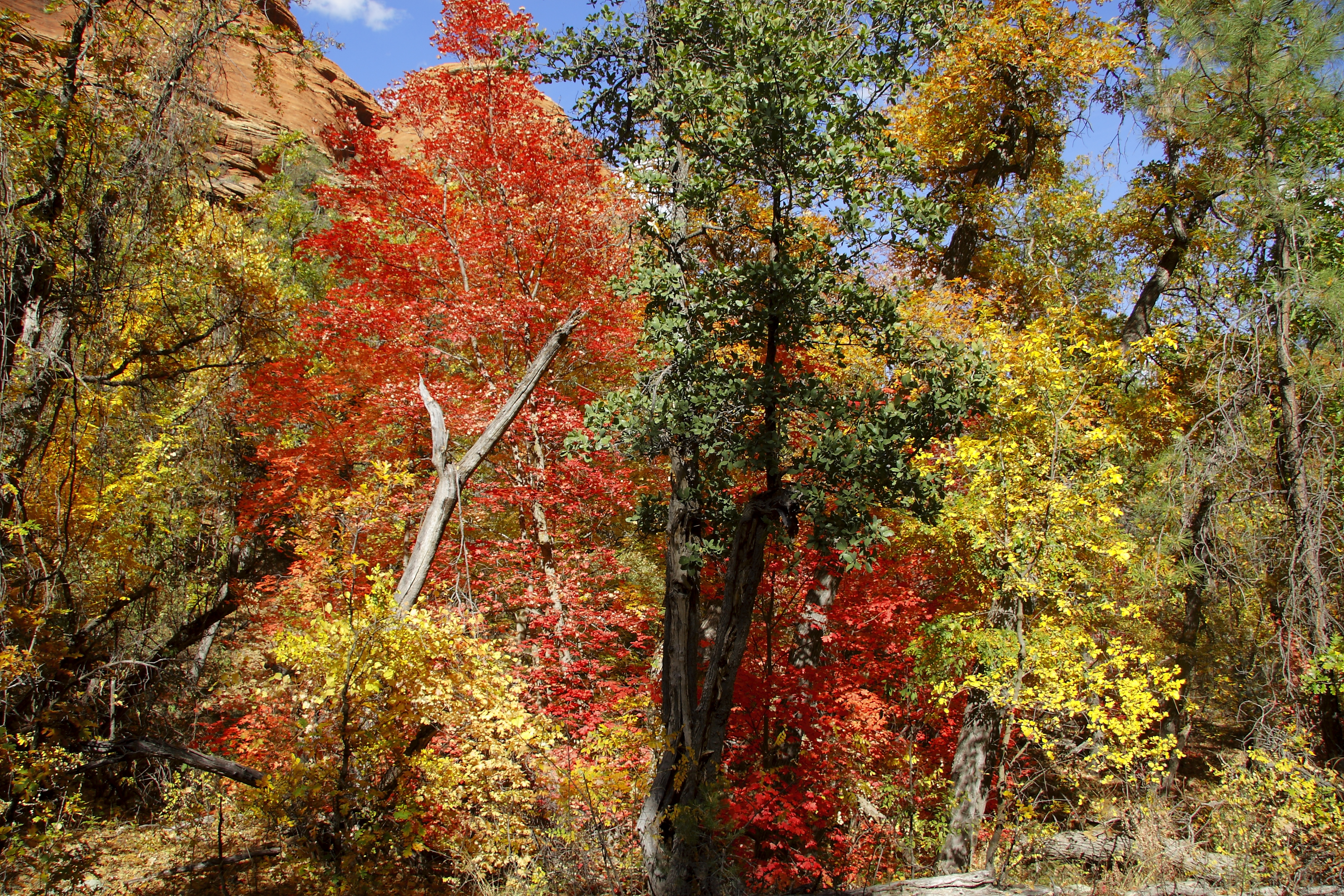
- Fall colors in Boynton Canyon
- Location: Coconino / Yavapai counties, Arizona, United States
- Nearest city: Sedona, AZ
- Coordinates: 34°57′56″N 111°51′24″W
- Area: 47,194 acres (191 km^{2})
- Established: 1984
- Governing body: U.S. Forest Service

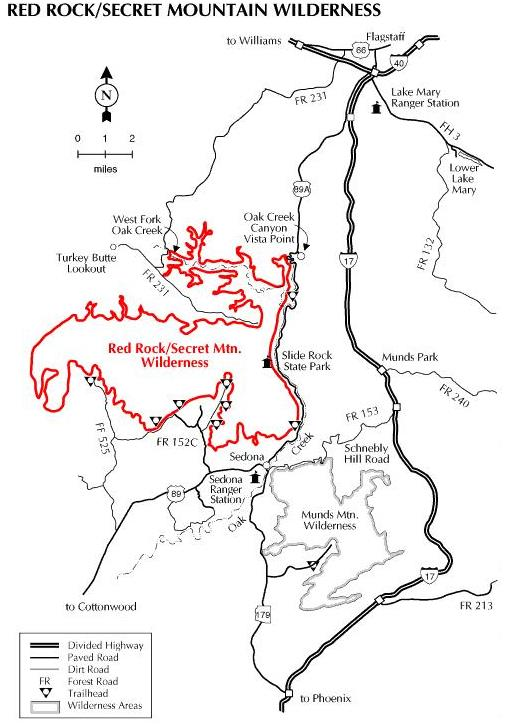
Map of Red Rock-Secret Mountain Wilderness

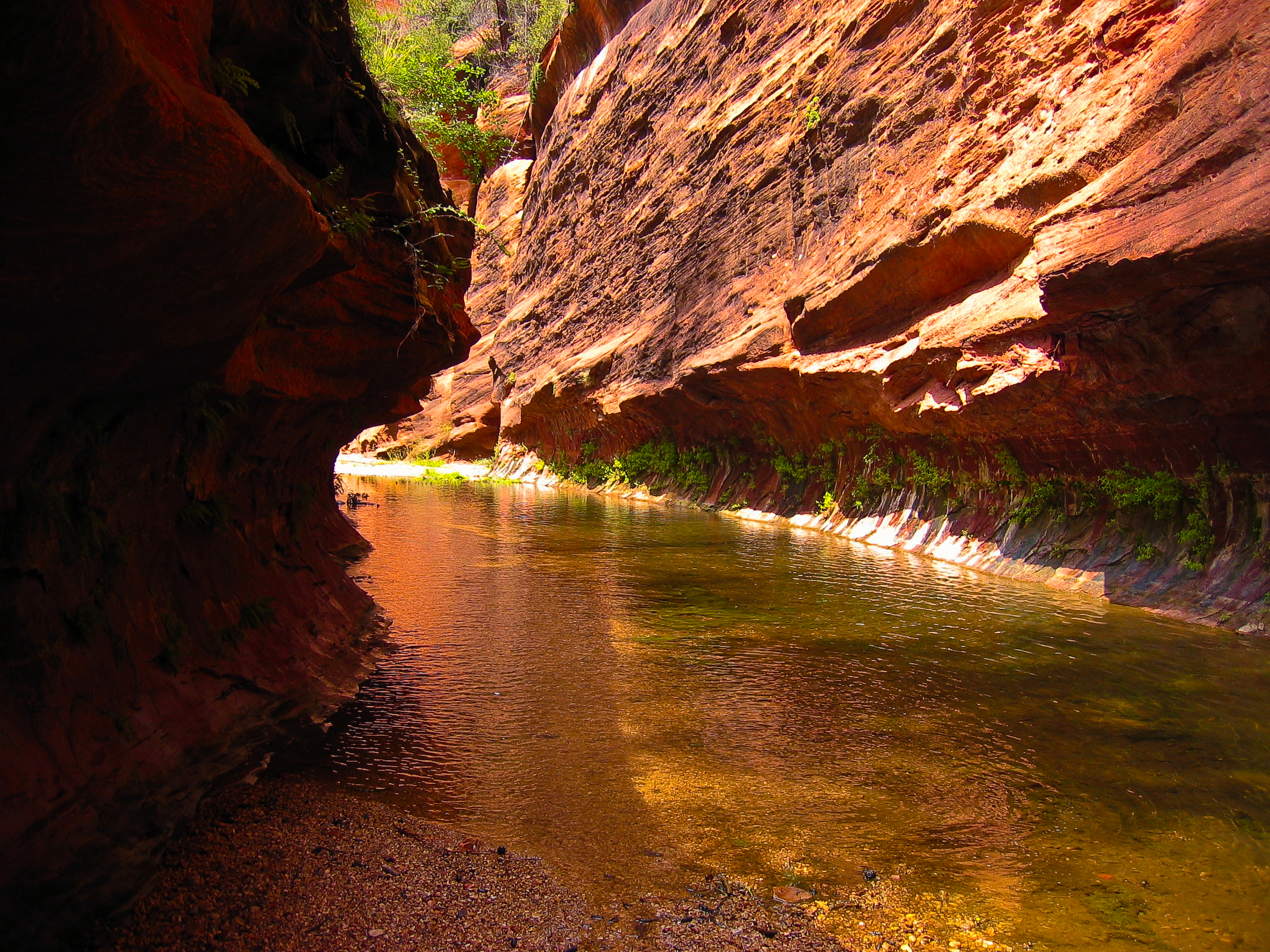
West Fork of Oak Creek Canyon, West Fork Trail

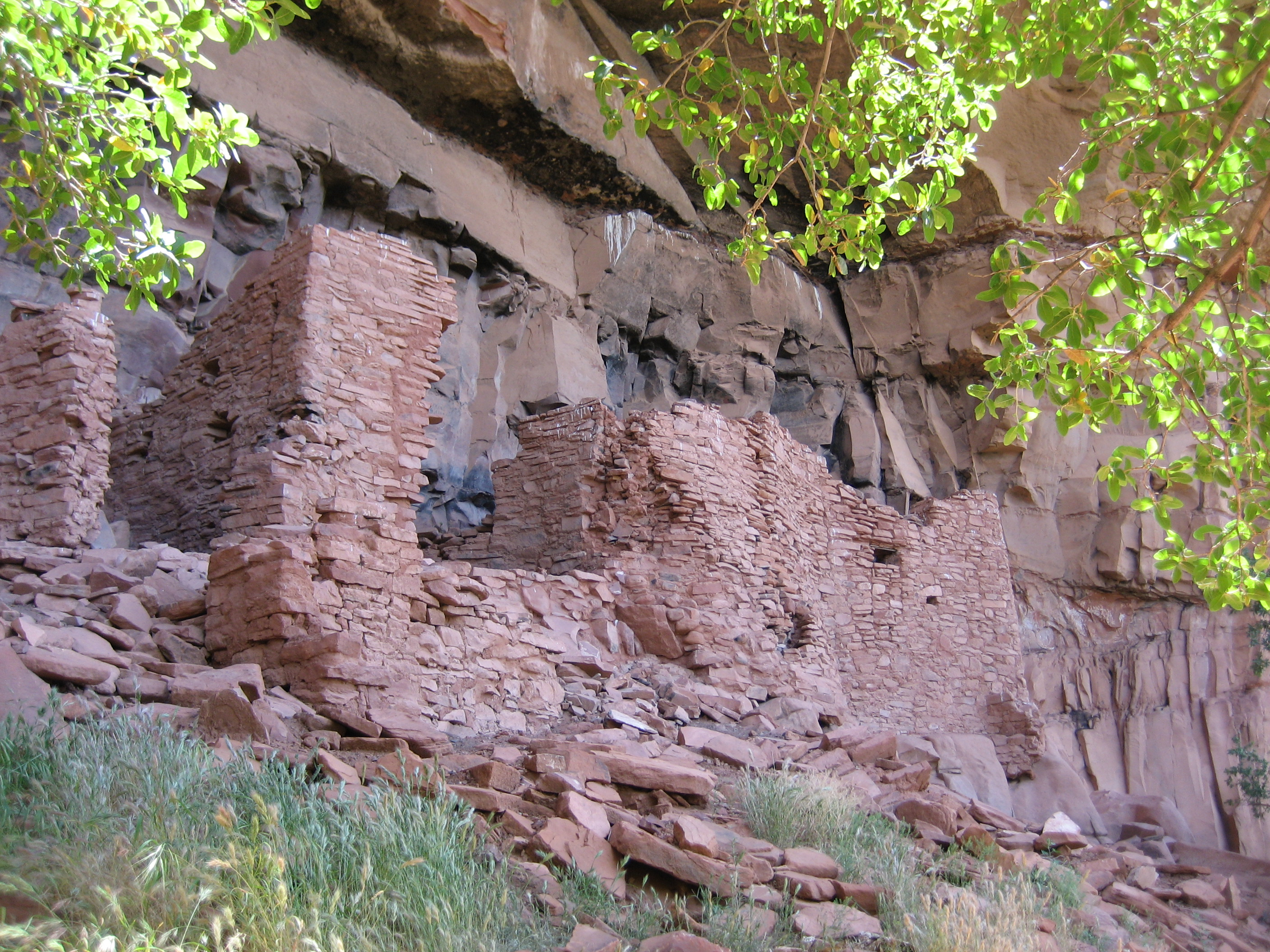
Sinagua ruin at Honanki, just south of the wilderness

The Red Rock-Secret Mountain Wilderness is a 47,195-acre (19,099 ha) wilderness area located within the Coconino National Forest in the U.S. state of Arizona.

The wilderness is predominantly wind and water sculpted pinnacles, windows, arches, and slot canyons, and the red-rock cliffs of the Mogollon Rim that mark the edge of the Colorado Plateau. Bordered on the east by Sycamore Canyon Wilderness, the high mesas of Secret Mountain and Wilson Mountain jut out into the lower country and canyons as deep as 1,500 feet (457 m) drain into Oak Creek and the Verde River.

Petroglyphs and abandoned cliff dwellings can be found in the wilderness.

== Wildlife ==
The high rims are relatively cool and moist compared with the lower desertland of the wilderness, and a wide variety of vegetation supports plentiful wildlife, including elk, mule deer, white-tailed deer, javelina, coyote, rabbit, mountain lion, and black bear.

== Recreation ==
Common recreational activities in the Red Rock-Secret Mountain Wilderness include horseback riding, photography, wildlife viewing, swimming, and hiking. There are numerous short trails in the wilderness:

- Mooney #12 (4.2 miles (6.8 km)) – Originally built to drive cattle to and from summer pastures on the Mogollon Rim, and still used for this purpose, the trail is steep and the views are good.
- Vultee Arch #22 (1.75 miles (2.8 km)) – This trail follows the bottom of Sterling Canyon, a drainage that is dry most of the year. It dead ends at a bronze plaque placed in memoriam for Gerard and Sylvia Vultee who lost their lives in an aircraft crash on January 29, 1938. The actual crash site is more than a mile north and at a much higher elevation, on East Picket Mesa. On the north side of the canyon across from the plaque is the sandstone arch named for Gerard "Jerry" Vultee, an early aircraft designer from California.
- Dry Creek #52 (2.5 miles (4.0 km)) – This trail is often hiked as part of a 6.2-mile (10.0 km) loop.
- Sterling Pass #46 (2.4 miles (3.9 km)) – Named for a local settler, this trail leads over a high saddle from Oak Creek Canyon into Sterling Canyon. Vultee Arch is also accessible from this trail.
- A.B. Young #100 (2.4 miles (3.9 km)) – Believed to have been built originally by C.S. "Bear" Howard in the 1880s, it was reconstructed in the 1930s by the Civilian Conservation Corps and supervised by A.B. Young. The trail climbs from Oak Creek Canyon to East Pocket Knob which is the highest point in the wilderness.
- West Fork Trail #108 (3 miles (4.8 km)) – This is the most popular trail in the Coconino National Forest and hikers should not expect solitude.
- Secret Mountain #109 (5 miles (8.0 km)) – This trail winds along the south edge of Secret Mountain, past the tops of several deep canyons including Hart Well, Boynton, and Long, and ends at the 6,607-foot (2,014 m) summit of Secret Mountain.
- Wilson Mountain/North Wilson #123 (5.6 miles (9.0 km)) – A strenuous 2,300-foot (701 m) climb to a view stretching over hundreds of square miles of scenic canyon country.
- Brin's Mesa #119 (3 miles (4.8 km)) – Hike past Coffee Pot Rock, Wilson Mountain, and Chimney Rock to the expansive view at Brin's Mesa.
- Fay Canyon #53 (1.1 miles (1.8 km)) – This trail in a box canyon leads past a natural arch to a dead end with evidence of ancient Indian dwellings.
- Loy Canyon #5 (5 miles (8.0 km)) – This path was used by the Samuel Loy family in the 1880s to move their livestock to and from summer pastures on the Mogollon Rim. The trail features a 2,300-foot (701 m) climb to the top of Secret Mountain.
- Boynton Canyon #47 (2.5 miles (4.0 km)) – Scenic, but somewhat busy, hike to a box canyon.
- Bear Mountain #54 (2.3 miles (3.7 km)) – This trail is a strenuous hike to the top of Bear Mountain. The trail ascends over 1,800 feet in elevation.

== See also ==
- List of Arizona Wilderness Areas
- List of U.S. Wilderness Areas
- Wilderness Act
