= Mount Wilson (Arizona) =

Landform in Mohave County, Arizona

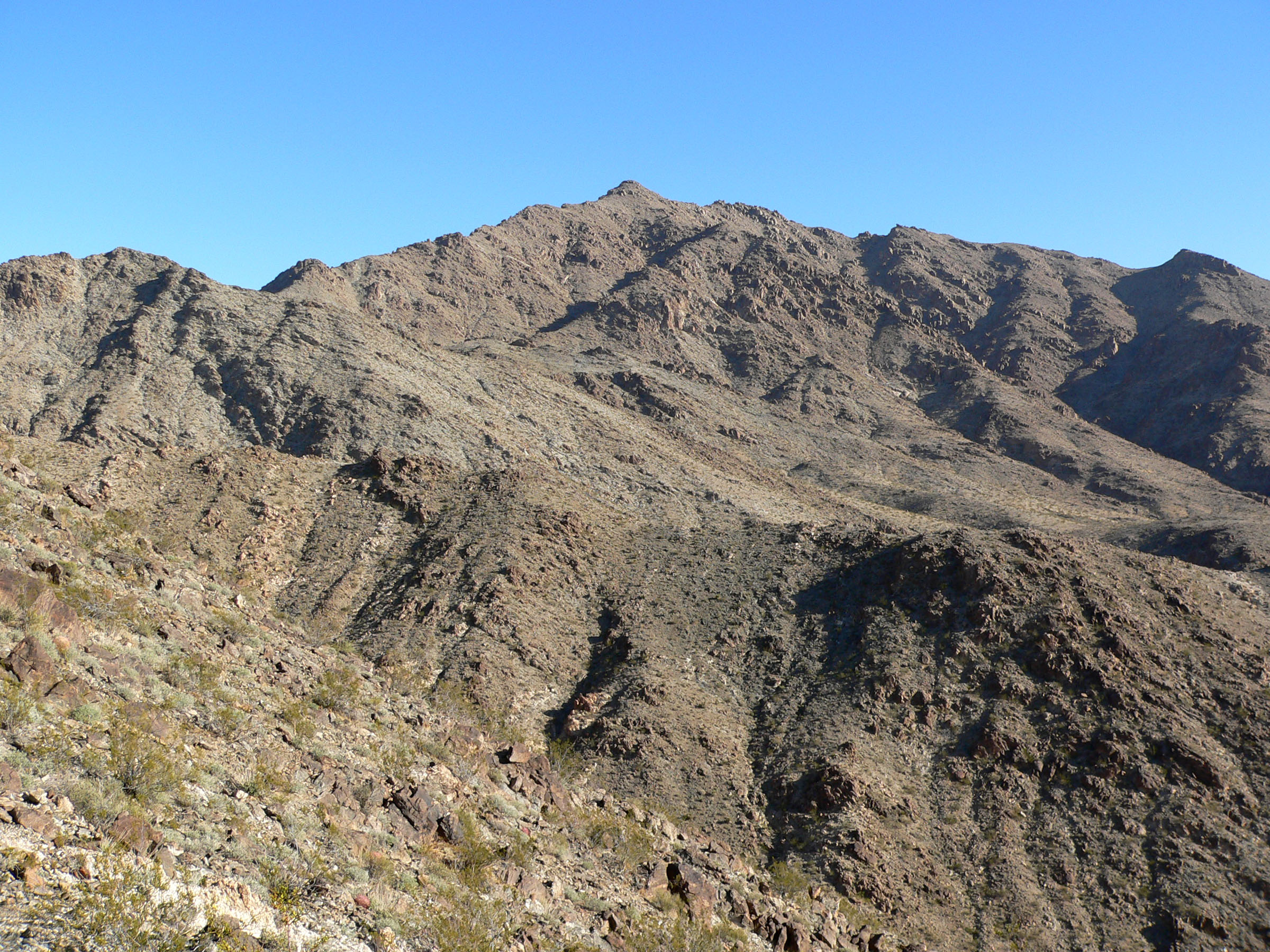
- Mount Wilson in December 2006

Highest point
- Elevation: 5,446 ft (1,660 m) NAVD 88
- Prominence: 3,205 ft (977 m)
- Coordinates: 35°59′48″N 114°36′43″W

Geography
- Location within Arizona
- Location: Mohave County, Arizona, U.S.
- Parent range: Black Mountains
- Topo map: USGS Mount Wilson

Mount Wilson is a mountain in Mohave County, Arizona, U.S. At 5,456 feet (1,663 m), it is the second highest point of the Black Mountains after Mount Perkins.

Mount Wilson Wilderness is a 23,900-acre protected wilderness area centered around the mountain, established in 1990 under the Arizona Desert Wilderness Act and managed by the Bureau of Land Management. This desert wilderness includes eight miles of the Wilson Ridge and is surrounded by the Lake Mead National Recreation Area.
