= Wilson Mountain (Arizona) =

Mountain in Arizona, United States

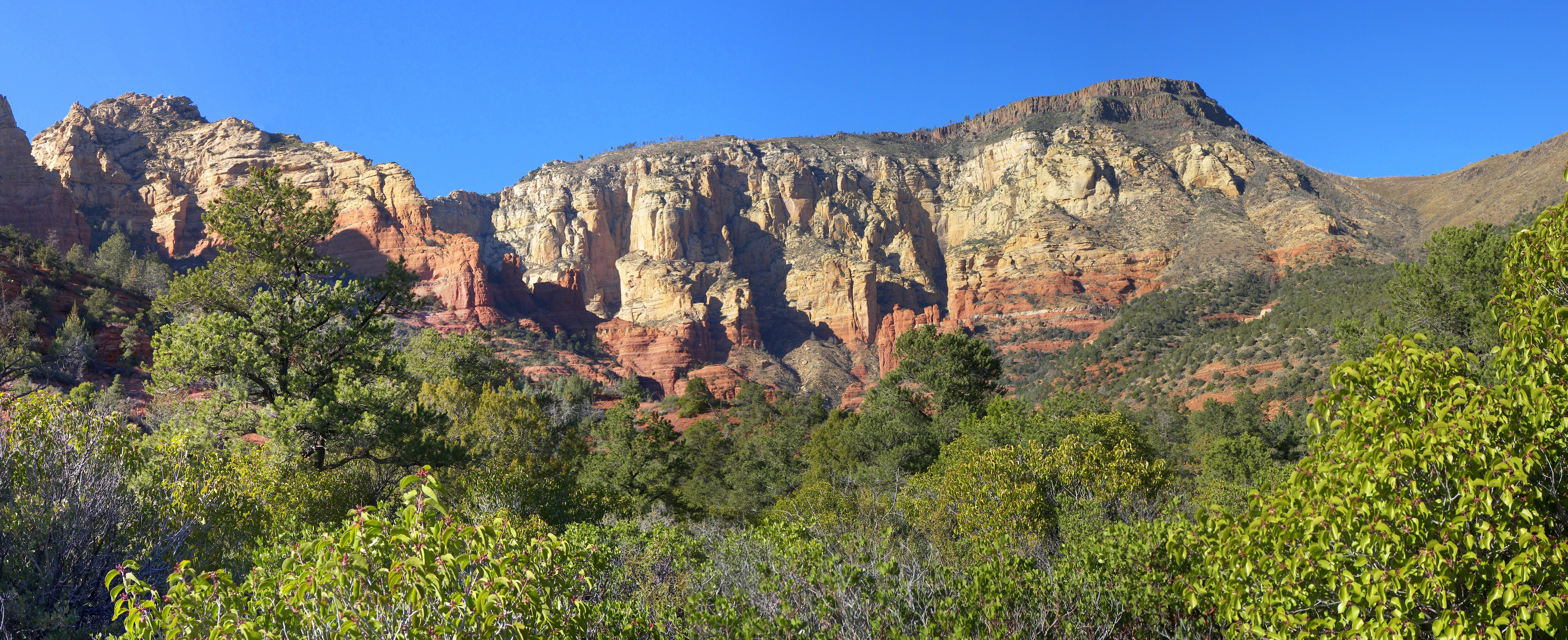
- South aspect

Highest point
- Elevation: 7,122 ft (2,171 m)
- Prominence: 1,422 ft (433 m)
- Parent peak: East Pocket Knob (7,196 ft)
- Isolation: 4.12 mi (6.63 km)
- Coordinates: 34°55′04″N 111°45′04″W

Naming
- Etymology: Richard Wilson

Geography
- Location within Arizona Location within the United States
- Country: United States
- State: Arizona
- County: Coconino
- Protected area: Red Rock-Secret Mountain Wilderness
- Parent range: Colorado Plateau
- Topo map: USGS Wilson Mountain

Geology
- Rock age: Permian
- Mountain type: Mesa
- Rock type(s): Basalt; Coconino Sandstone; Schnebly Hill Formation

Climbing
- Easiest route: Scrambling (class 2+)

Wilson Mountain is a 7,122-foot-elevation (2,171-meter) summit in Coconino County, Arizona, United States.

== Description ==
Wilson Mountain is located three miles north of Sedona in the Red Rock-Secret Mountain Wilderness, on land managed by Coconino National Forest. It is the highest peak in Sedona, and second-highest in the wilderness. Precipitation runoff from this mountain drains to Oak Creek which is part of the Verde River watershed. Topographic relief is significant as the summit rises over 2,400 feet (732 meters) above Oak Creek Canyon in one mile (1.6 km). The nearest higher neighbor is East Pocket Knob, 3.73 miles (6 km) to the north. Wilson Mountain is composed of light-colored Coconino Sandstone overlaying reddish Schnebly Hill Formation, which is all capped by a layer of dark-gray basalt. Hiking to the top via the Wilson Mountain Trail covers 5.6 miles (one-way) with 2,300 feet of elevation gain.

== Etymology ==
Wilson Mountain and Wilson Canyon, which is on the mountain's southern slope, are named after Richard Wilson who was killed by a grizzly bear in the canyon in June 1885. Wilson, a bear hunter, was unable to resist the temptation to shoot the large grizzly with a small rifle he had with him instead of his usual large caliber bear gun, which was being repaired. The bear was only wounded, and attacked Wilson, and his mauled body was found nine days later. The mountain's toponym has been officially adopted by the United States Board on Geographic Names. Landforms officially named in association include Wilson Canyon, Lost Wilson Mountain, and First Bench of Wilson Mountain.

== Climate ==
According to the Köppen climate classification system, Wilson Mountain is located in a temperate semi-arid climate zone. Hikers can expect afternoon rain and lightning from the seasonal monsoon in late July and August.

== See also ==
- List of mountain peaks of Arizona

== Gallery ==
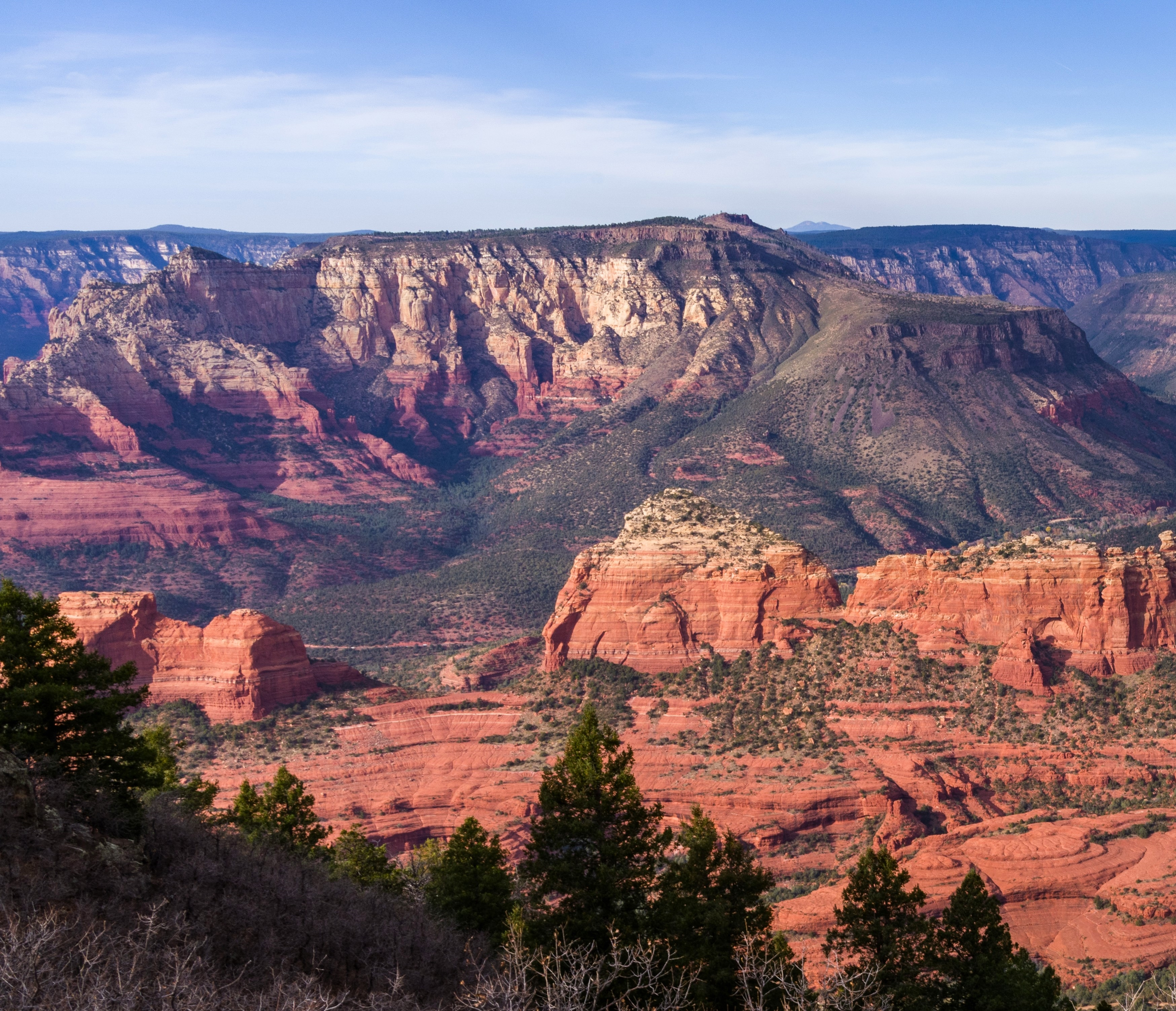
Wilson Mountain viewed from Munds Mountain

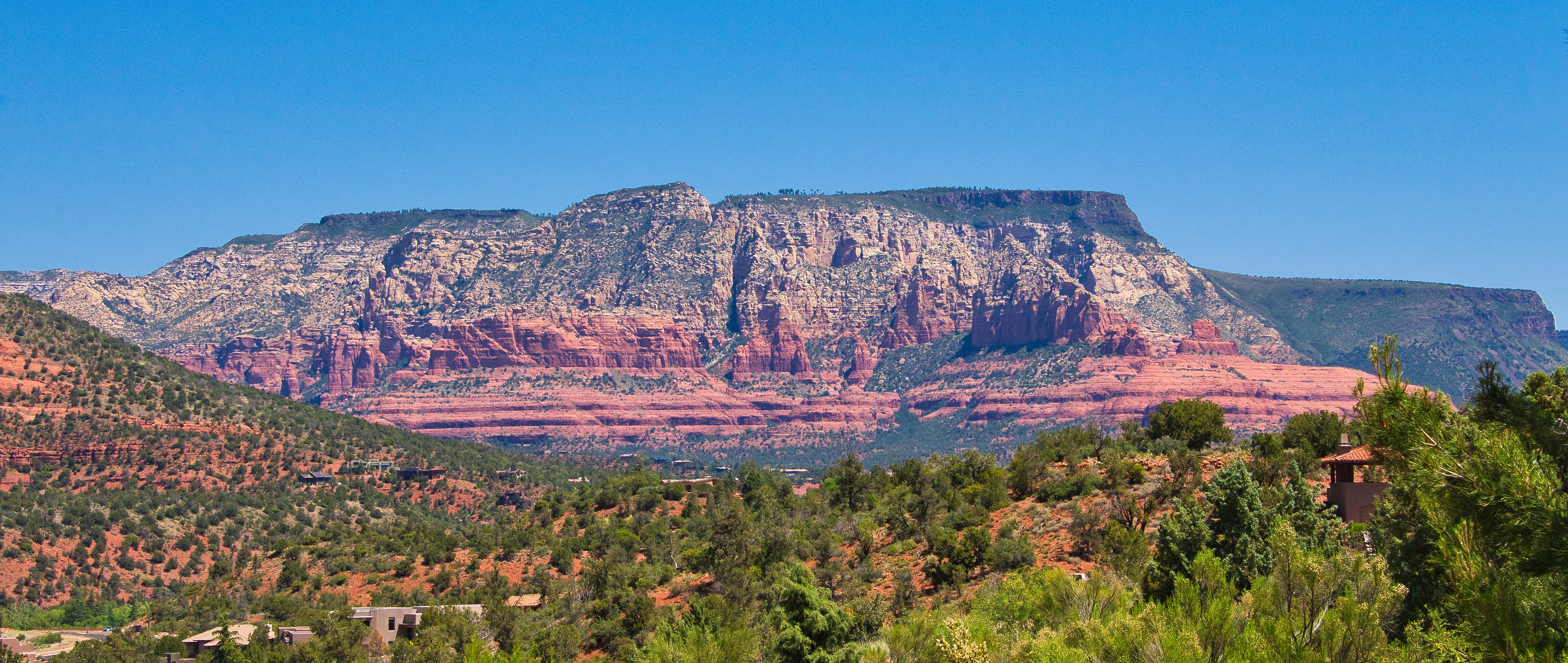
SSW aspect, from airport

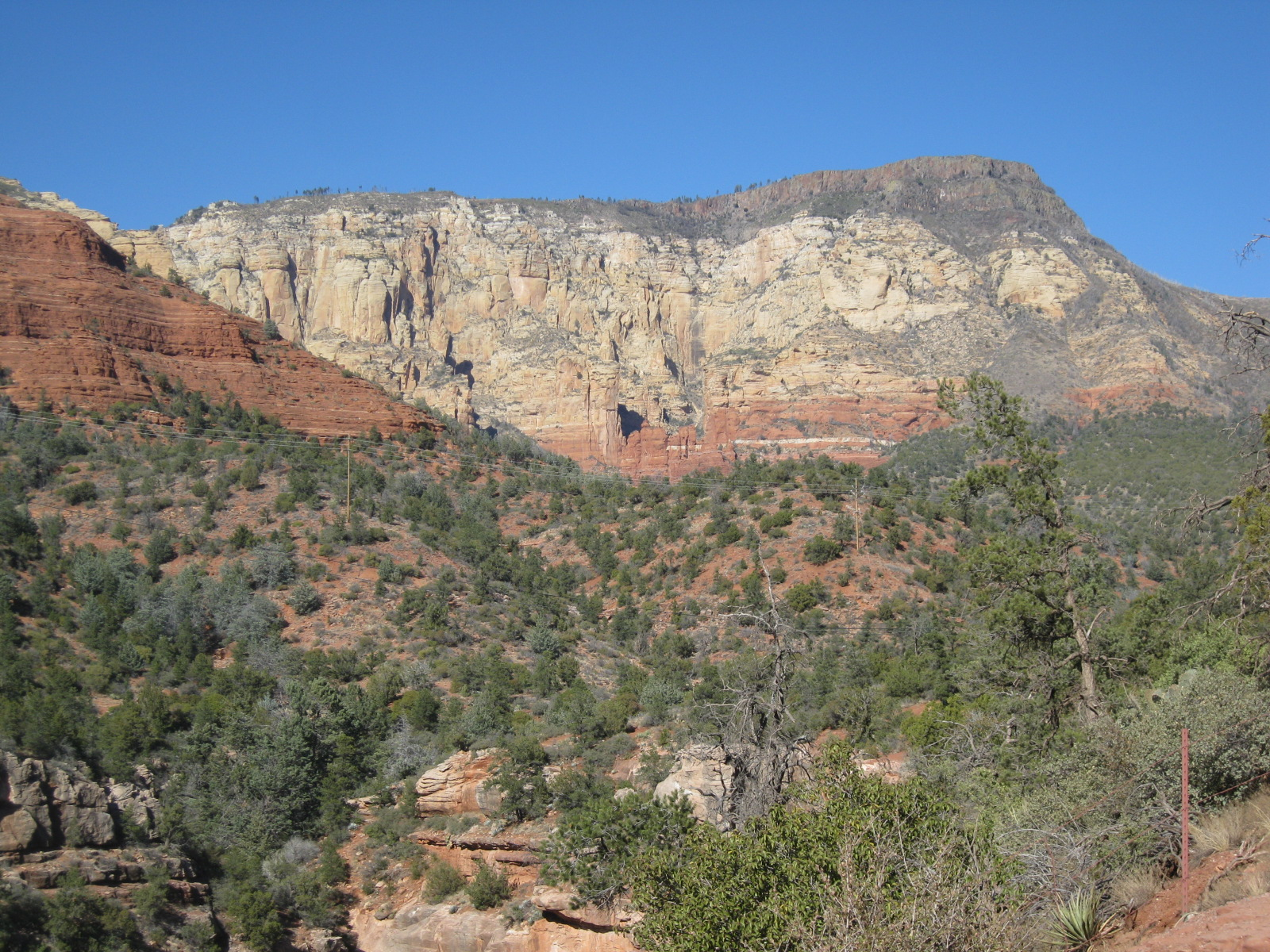
South aspect from Midgely Bridge on Highway 89A

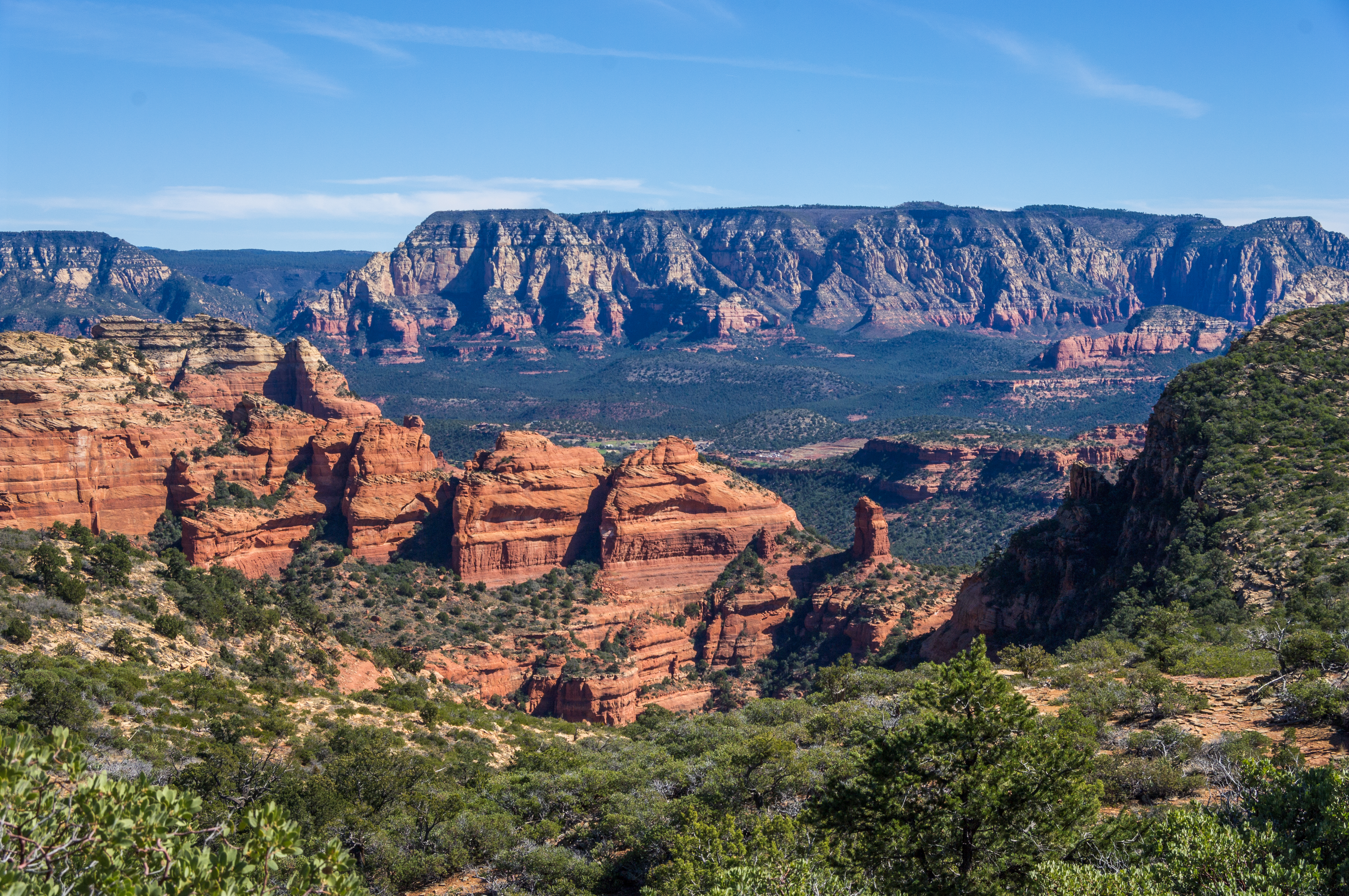
West aspect of Wilson Mountain on skyline viewed from Bear Mountain

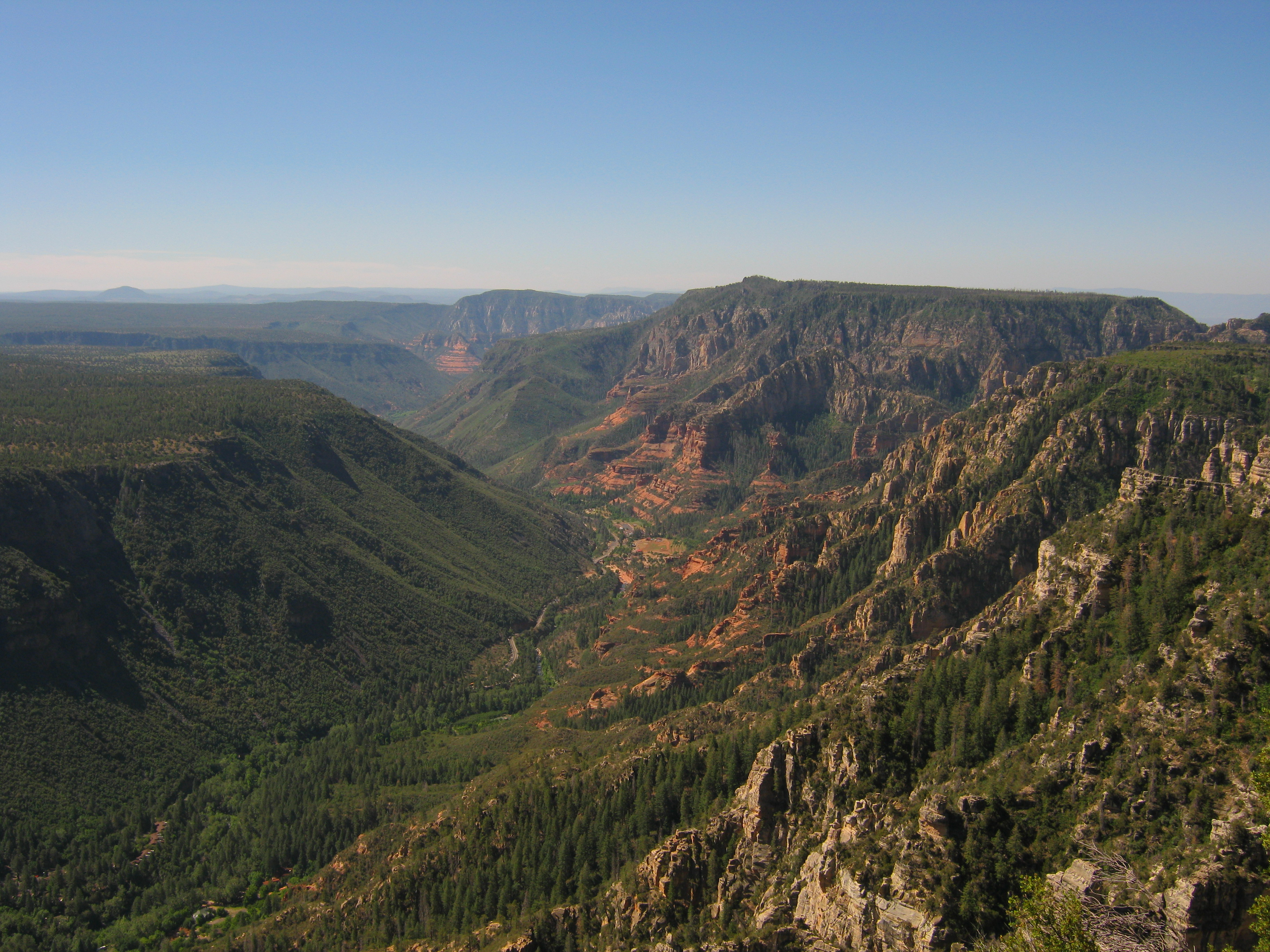
North aspect of Wilson Mountain to right of center, with Oak Creek Canyon below.
