= Munds Mountain Wilderness =

Protected area in the Coconino National Forest, Arizona

- IUCN category Ib (wilderness area)
- Location: Coconino and Yavapai counties, United States
- Nearest city: Sedona
- Coordinates: 34°49′N 111°43′W
- Area: 18,150 acres (7,350 ha)
- Established: 1984
- Governing body: U.S. Forest Service

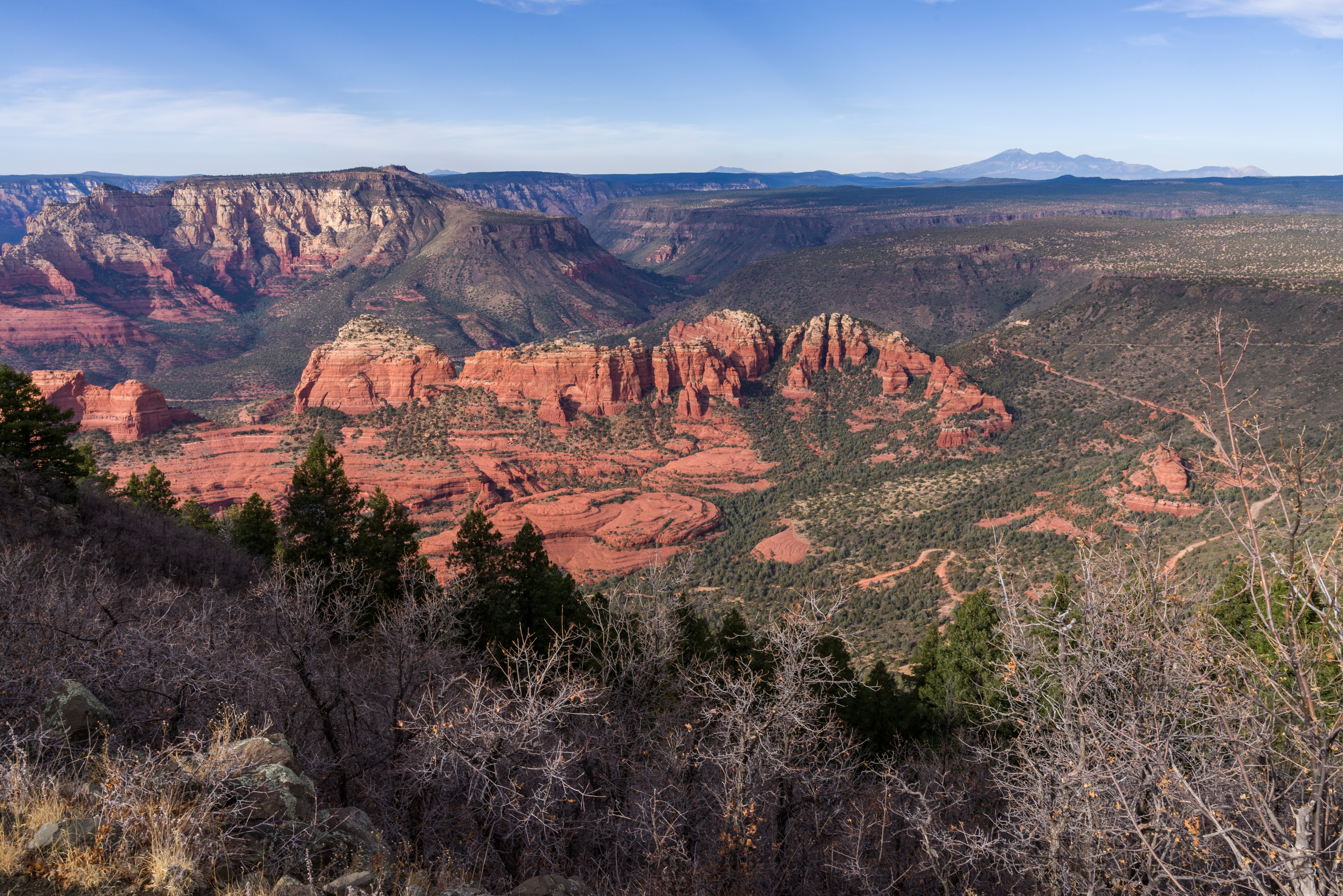
The Munds Mountain Trail

Munds Mountain Wilderness is an 18,150-acre (7,345 ha) wilderness area in the Coconino National Forest in the U.S. state of Arizona. It is immediately southeast of Sedona between Arizona State Route 179 and Interstate 17. The wilderness lies within the Munds Mountain and Sedona quadrangles of the national topographic map of the United States Geological Survey.

Several trails meander through the wilderness, including the Jacks Canyon and Hot Loop trails leading from Oak Creek Canyon to high overlooks. The 10.4-mile (16.7 km) Hot Loop Trail runs generally north–south over Horse Mesa. Landmarks visible from vantage points along this trail include Bell Rock, Courthouse Butte, Sycamore Pass, and Woods Canyon. Jacks Canyon Trail also meanders generally north–south, with significant east–west segments, for 6.5 miles (10.5 km) through the wilderness near Sedona and Oak Creek. It connects with the steep Munds Mountain Trail, from which the major Sedona-area rock formations and other landmarks in the region are visible.

Depending on the elevation, flora and fauna in this wilderness include desert cottontails, black-tailed jackrabbits, Gambel's quail, desert sagebrush, oaks, pinyon pines, junipers, Arizona cypress, catclaw acacia, false palo verde, and banana yucca, among others.

== See also ==
- List of Arizona Wilderness Areas
- List of U.S. Wilderness Areas
- Wilderness Act
