= Cathedral Rock =

Landform in Arizona, United States

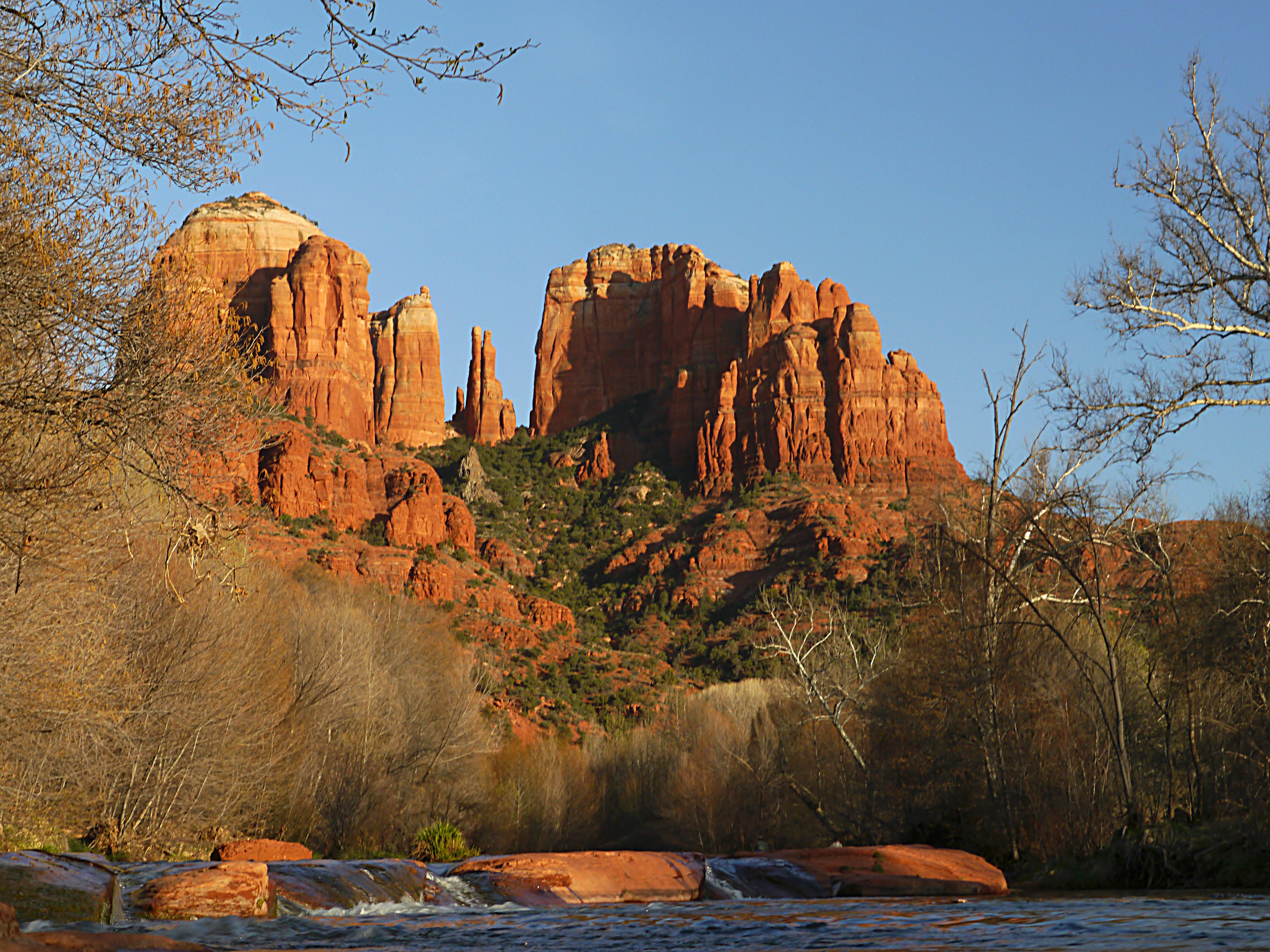
- Cathedral Rock at sunset

Highest point
- Elevation: 4,967 ft (1,514 m) NGVD 29
- Prominence: 284 ft (87 m)
- Coordinates: 34°49′12″N 111°47′36″W

Geography
- Location within Arizona Location within the United States
- Location: Yavapai County, Arizona, U.S.
- Topo map: USGS Sedona

Cathedral Rock is a natural sandstone butte near Sedona, Arizona, United States, and one of the most-photographed sights in the state. The rock formation is located in Coconino National Forest in Yavapai County, about 1 mile (1.6 km) west of State Route 179 (SR 179), and about 2.5 mi (4.0 km) south of the "Y" intersection of SR 179 and SR 89A in uptown Sedona. The summit elevation of Cathedral Rock is 4,967 ft (1,514 m).

The Cathedral Rock trail (USFS Trail #170) is a popular short, steep ascent from the Back O' Beyond trailhead to the saddle points or "gaps" in Cathedral Rock.

Geologically, Cathedral Rock is carved from the Permian Schnebly Hill formation, a redbed sandstone formed from coastal sand dunes near the shoreline of the ancient Pedregosa Sea. Ripple marks are prominent along the lower Cathedral Rock trail, and a black basalt dike may be seen in the first saddle.

Cathedral Rock was called "Court House Rock" on some early maps, and Courthouse Butte was called "Church House Rock", which has caused endless confusion ever since.

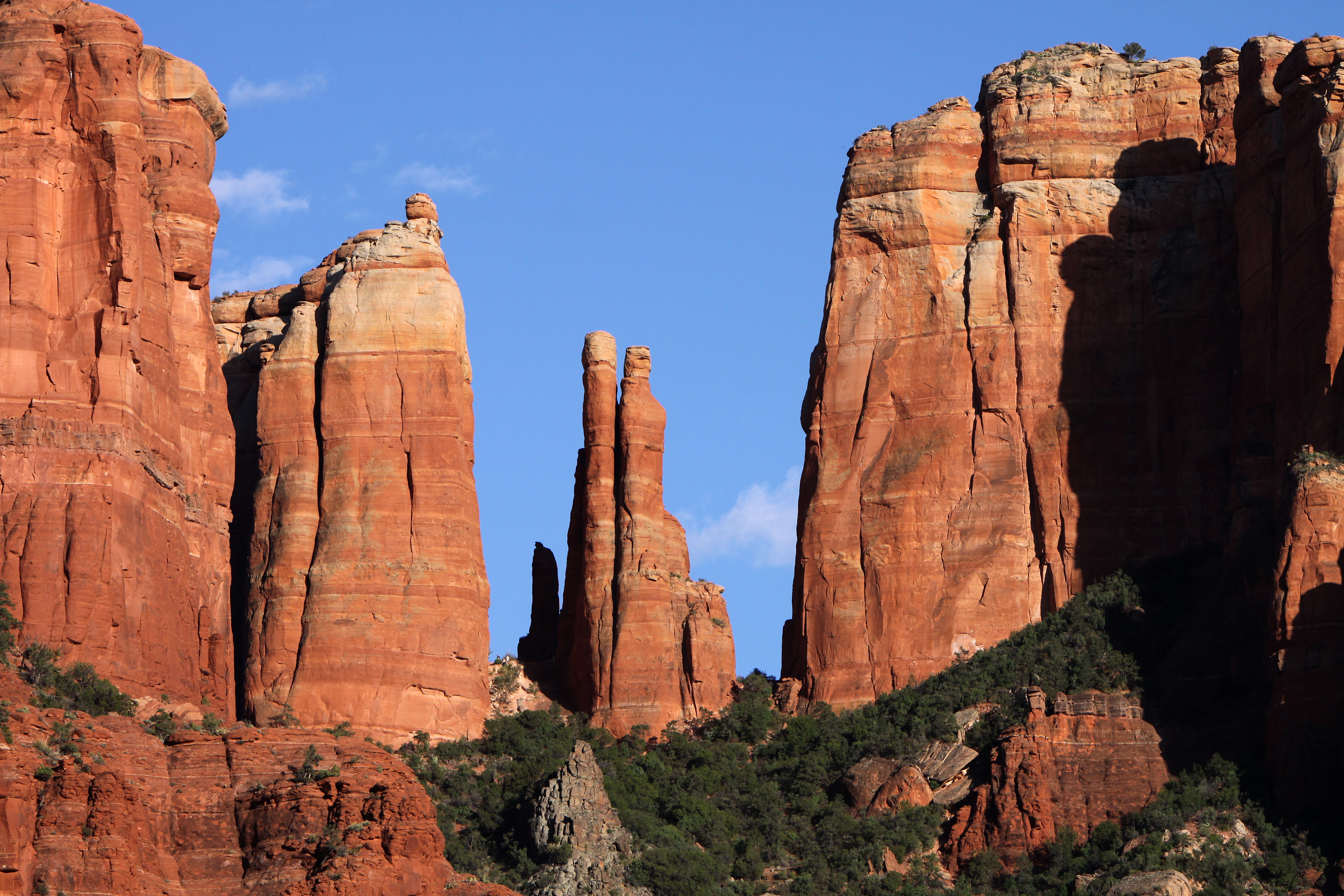
These saddle points or "gaps" may be reached via the steep Cathedral Rock trail.

== See also ==
- Bell Rock
