= Schnebly Hill Formation =

Dark red sandstone, the major component of the red rocks of Sedona, Arizona

Coordinates: 34.8909°N 111.7056°W

- Stratigraphic range: 286–273 Ma
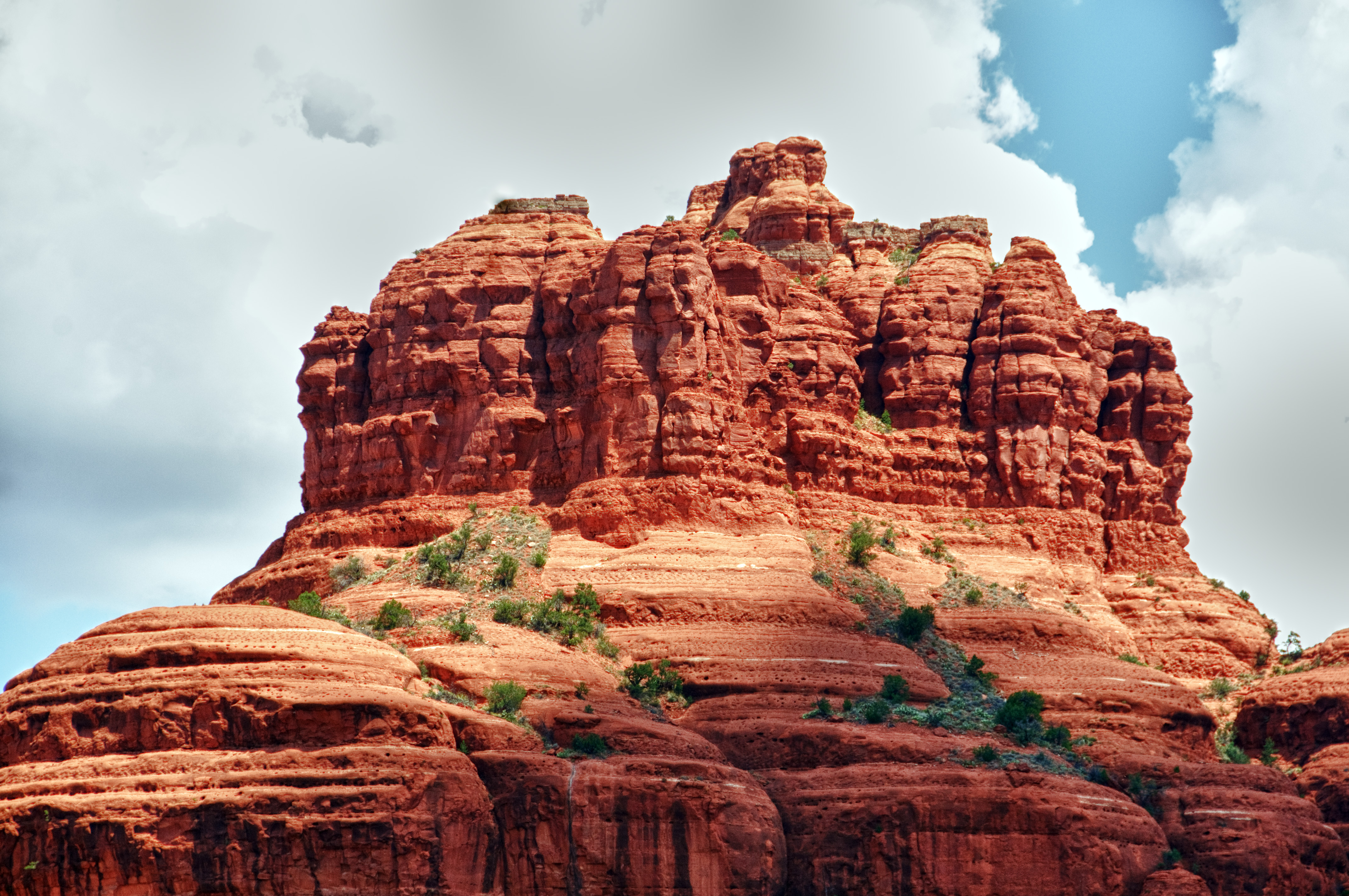
- Bell Rock, Sedona
- Thickness: 800 feet (240 m) to 1,000 feet (300 m)

Lithology
- Primary: Sandstone

Location
- Region: Colorado Plateau
- Country: United States

Type section
- Named for: Sedona Schnebly
- Location: Arizona
- Thickness at type section: 800 feet (240 m) to 1,000 feet (300 m)

The Schnebly Hill Formation is a section of red bed deposits found at the Colorado Plateau, near Sedona, Arizona. It is a dark red sandstone, from 800 feet (240 m) to 1,000 feet (300 m) thick. It lies between Coconino Sandstone and the older Hermit Formation. It is near the Supai Group.

The source of the name "Schnebly" is Sedona Schnebly, after whom the city of Sedona was named.

== Geology ==
The formation traces to the Permian Age.

The formation is the most prominent layer of the red rocks of the Sedona area due the presence of hematite – iron-oxide (rust) – giving the sandstone a red color. The Schnebly Hill Sandstone formation comprises three sections:

- the Bell Rock member,
- the Fort Apache member, and
- the Sycamore Pass member.

== See also ==
=== Sedona-area rocks ===
- Bell Rock
- Capitol Butte
- Cathedral Rock
- Courthouse Butte
- Red Rock State Park
- Slide Rock State Park
- Two Nuns

=== Local geology ===
- Colorado Plateau
- Mogollon Rim
- Supai Group

=== Local interest ===
- Cottonwood, Arizona
- Honanki
- Jerome, Arizona
- Jerome State Historic Park
- Chapel of the Holy Cross
- Oak Creek Canyon
- Palatki Heritage Site
- Slide Rock State Park

== External links and references ==
- Schnebly Hill Formation, a few images
- A hiking site on the Schnebly Hill Formation
- Travels in goeology, Sedona area
- How were Sedona's red rocks formed?
- Relationship between Schnebly Hill Formation and the Supai Group
- On YouTube video
