= Two Nuns =

Summit in Arizona, United States

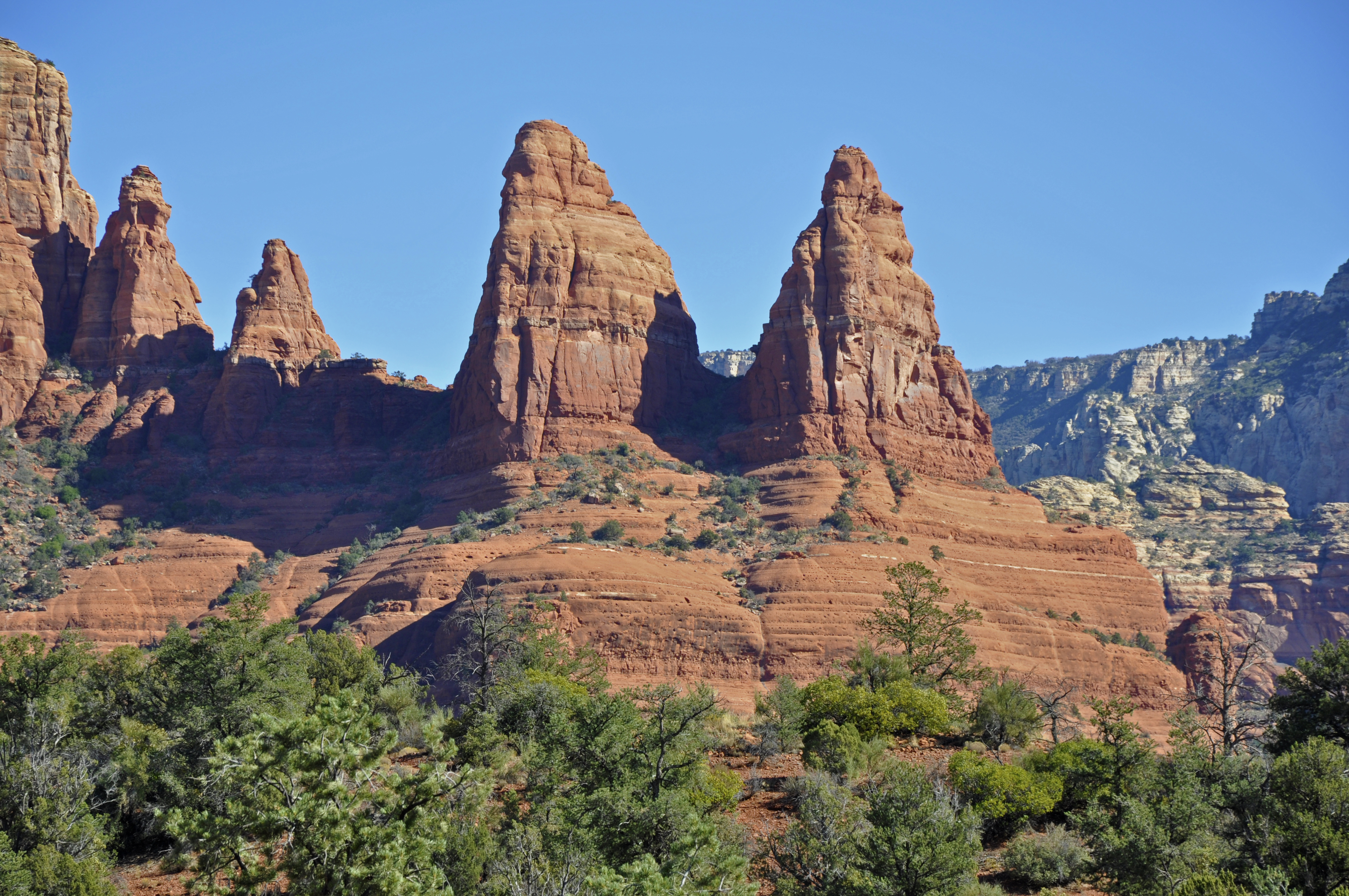
- West aspect

Highest point
- Elevation: 5,140 ft (1,567 m)
- Prominence: 200 ft (61 m)
- Isolation: 0.2 mi (0.32 km)
- Coordinates: 34°49′47″N 111°45′26″W

Geography
- Location within Arizona Location within the United States
- Country: United States
- State: Arizona
- County: Coconino
- Protected area: Coconino National Forest
- Parent range: Colorado Plateau
- Topo map: USGS Sedona

Geology
- Rock age: Permian
- Rock type: Sandstone

Climbing
- First ascent: 1970 Fred Beckey
- Easiest route: class 5.10

Two Nuns are 5,140-foot-elevation (1,567-meter) summits in Coconino County, Arizona, United States.

== Description ==
Two Nuns is located 2.5 miles (4.0 km) south of Sedona and one-half mile (0.8 km) east of Chapel of the Holy Cross, on land managed by Coconino National Forest. Precipitation runoff from this landform drains to Oak Creek which is part of the Verde River watershed. Topographic relief is significant as the summit rises 740 feet (226 meters) above Little Horse Park in 0.2 mile (0.32 km). Two Nuns is composed of reddish sandstone of the Schnebly Hill Formation. The landform's Two Nuns toponym has not been officially adopted by the United States Board on Geographic Names, so various names exist such as "The Nuns", "Twin Nuns", "Christianity Spire", "Streaker Spire" and "The Four Nuns."

== North Nun ==
North Nun is also known as Christianity Spire. It is sometimes also called Beckey's Spire for Fred Beckey who made the first ascent in 1970. The class 5.10 rock-climbing route called Blast from the Past was first climbed by Tom Isaac and Jeff Bowman.

== South Nun ==
The South Nun is also known as Streaker Spire. The North Face (class 5.7+) was first climbed in 1972 by Scott Baxter, Ross Hardwick, Karl Karlstrom, and Geoff Parker.

== Climate ==
According to the Köppen climate classification system, Two Nuns is located in a temperate semi-arid climate zone. Climbers can expect afternoon rain and lightning from the seasonal monsoon in late July and August.

== See also ==
- List of mountain peaks of Arizona

== Gallery ==
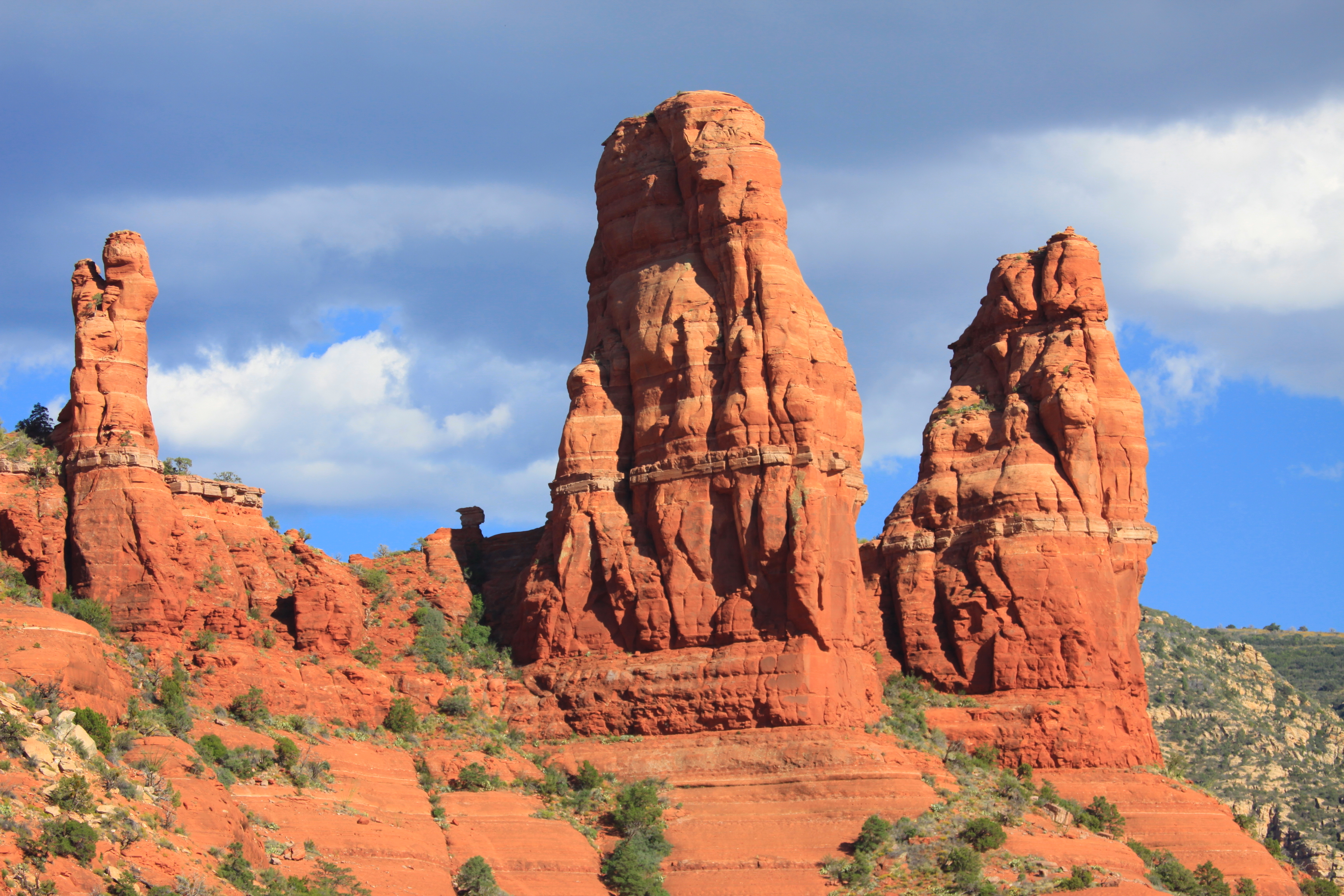
Christianity Spire centered, Streaker Spire on the right

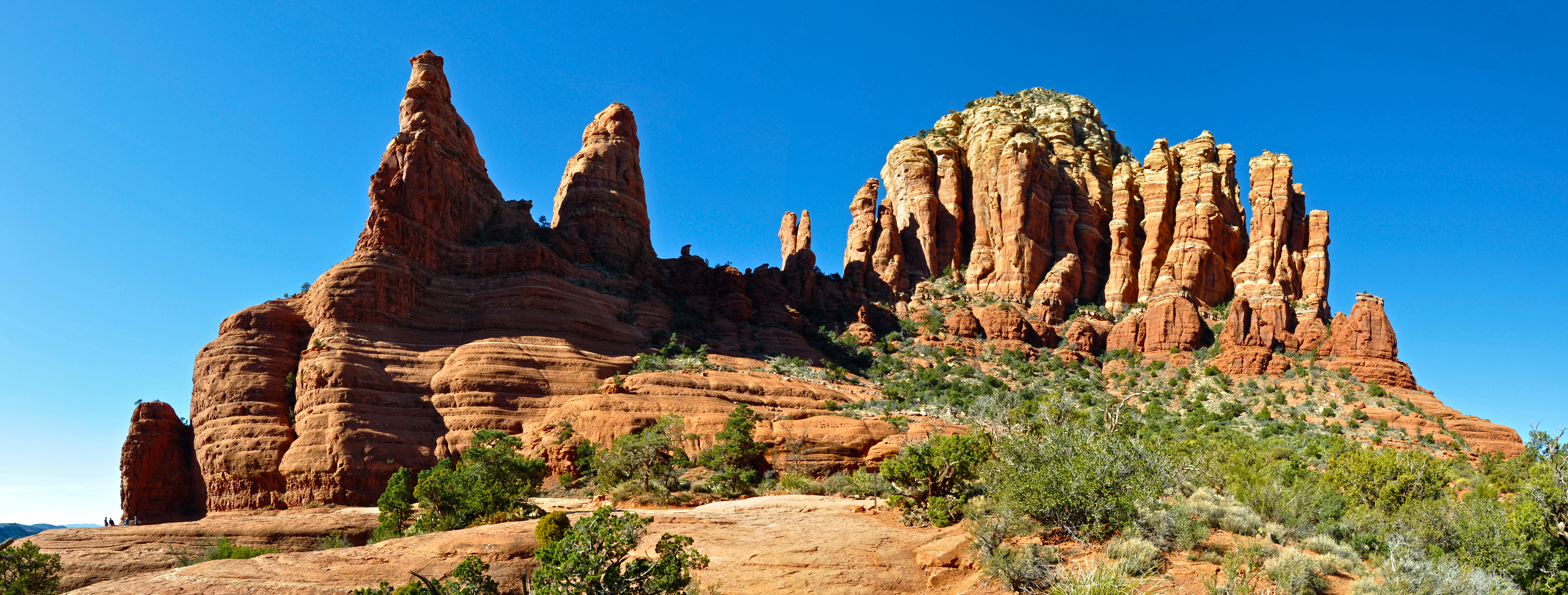
East aspect
