= Tinder Fire =

2018 wildfire in Arizona, United States

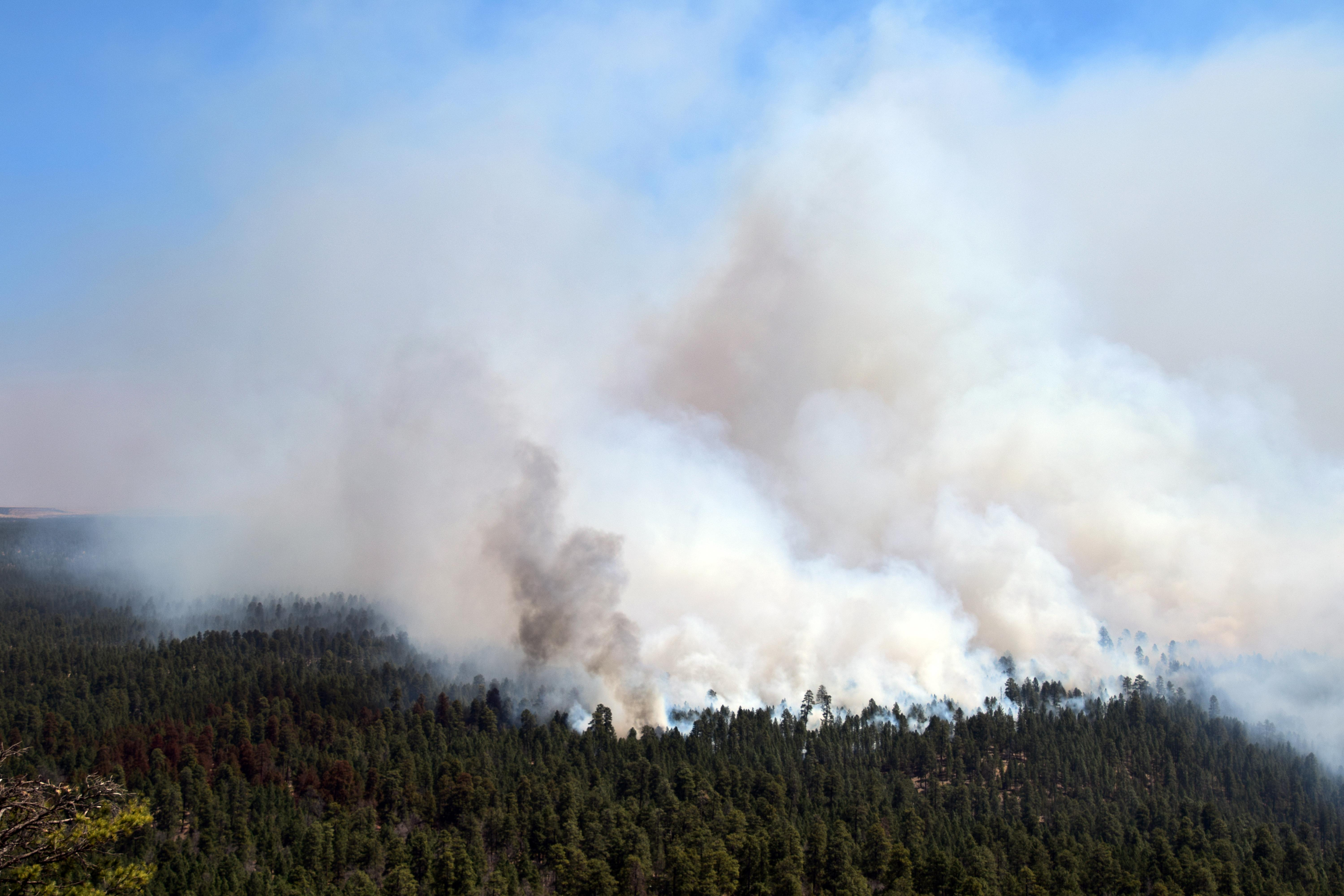
- Tinder Fire on April 30, 2018
- Date: April 27 – May 24, 2018
- Location: Coconino National Forest, Arizona, United States
- Coordinates: 34.558°N 111.161°W

Statistics
- Burned area: 16,309 acres (6,600 ha; 25.483 mi^{2})

Impacts
- Structures lost: 96
- Cost: $7.5 million (equivalent to $9.6 million in 2025)

Ignition
- Cause: Illegal campfire

Map
- Location within Arizona Location within the United States

The Tinder Fire was a wildfire that burned 16,309 acres (6,600 ha) of the Coconino National Forest in the U.S. state of Arizona during April and May 2018. The fire was detected by a United States Forest Service (USFS) lookout tower on April 27, 2018, and firefighters began working to contain its spread within the day. Benefiting from strong winds, low humidity, and high temperatures, the fire grew rapidly over late April, prompting the closure of Arizona State Route 87 and evacuation orders for 1,000 houses in Coconino County. These orders remained until May 4. Almost 700 firefighters were involved in combating the fire, which was fully contained on May 24. The investigation into the fire determined that the Tinder Fire was caused by a prohibited campfire.

== Background ==
Wildfires are a natural part of the ecological cycle of the Southwestern United States. The Tinder Fire was one of 2,000 wildfires that burned 165,356 acres (66,917 ha) in Arizona in 2018. In January 2018, Doug Ducey, the governor of Arizona, warned that the state—then in a historically dry winter season, plagued by drought, and recovering from the 2017 wildfire season—could face a "disastrous" wildfire season in 2018. At the time the Tinder Fire began, weather conditions in the Mogollon Rim region of Arizona were abnormally dry, hot, and windy; four red flag warnings had been issued by the National Weather Service for the area since April 1.

== Fire ==
At 11:43 a.m. (Mountain Time), April 27, 2018, a United States Forest Service (USFS) lookout tower spotted smoke rising from a location near the Kinder Crossing Trail 1.5 mi (2.4 km) east of the Blue Ridge Reservoir, in the Coconino National Forest. The fire was intended to be named after this trail, but a dispatcher's error resulted in the name Tinder Fire, which was retained. Within the day, 100 firefighters had arrived to combat the Tinder Fire, then at a size of 150 acres (61 ha). Winds up to 50 mph (80 km/h) fanned the fire and hindered firefighting aviation—which was grounded on April 29 by a civilian drone flying over the fire—over April 28 and April 29. This rapid growth prompted the closure of Arizona State Route 87 (SR 87), evacuation orders for 1,000 homes in Coconino County, and the declaration of a state of emergency in Coconino County by Ducey on April 30.

By May 1, the Tinder Fire had grown to a size of 11,420 acres (4,620 ha) and destroyed 30 buildings. The next day, rain and snow slowed the growth of the fire and allowed firefighters to make progress in containing its spread. By May 3, 625 firefighters were digging firebreaks around the Tinder Fire. The evacuation orders were lifted on May 4, by which time the fire had grown to an area of 15,841 acres (6,411 ha), but was believed to be 79% contained. SR 87 was also reopened to public traffic on May 4. By May 12, the fire had grown to 16,309 acres (6,600 ha), but no further, despite windy conditions; by May 24, authorities declared it to be 95% contained.

== Aftermath ==
The Tinder Fire burned 16,309 acres (6,600 ha) over 27 days and cost $7.5 million (equivalent to $9.6 million in 2025) to contain and suppress. About 10% of this area suffered total foliage mortality. The Tinder Fire destroyed 96 buildings, of which 33 were homes and 63 were minor structures. At the fire's peak, 695 firefighters worked to contain its spread.

The USFS began to investigate the cause of the fire on April 27 and concluded by May 1 that it was an abandoned, illegal campfire. The USFS were unable to determine the responsible party or parties.
