= Red Mountain (Coconino County, Arizona) =

Volcanic cinder cone in Coconino County, Arizona, US

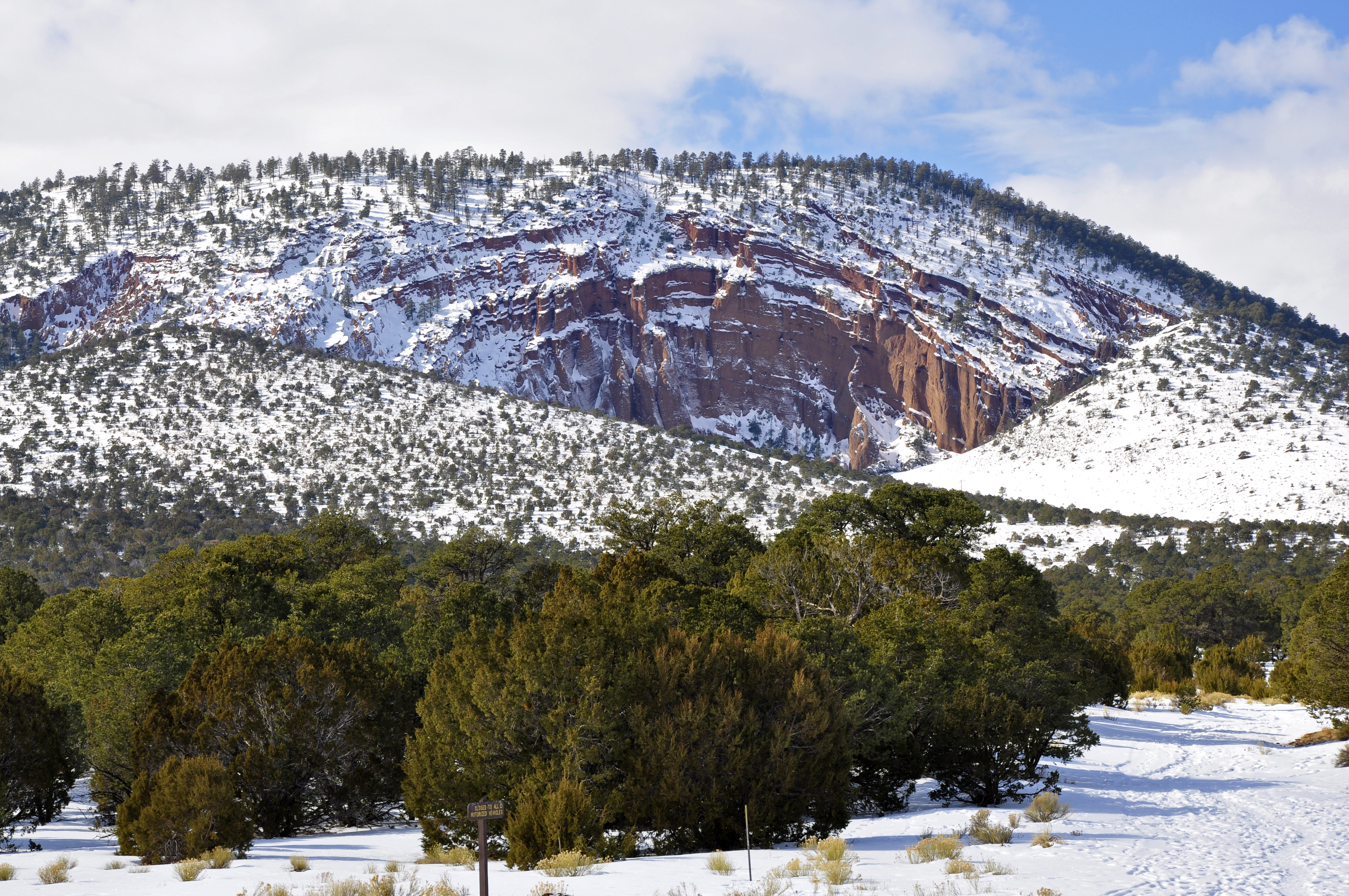
- Red Mountain in winter. Snow outlines the eroded amphitheater, which may have resulted from a steam-blast explosion

Highest point
- Elevation: 7,968 ft (2,429 m) NGVD 29
- Prominence: 1,005 ft (306 m)
- Coordinates: 35°31′23″N 111°52′32″W

Geography
- Location within Arizona
- Location: Coconino County, Arizona, U.S.
- Topo map: USGS Chapel Mountain

Geology
- Mountain type: cinder cone
- Volcanic field: San Francisco volcanic field

Red Mountain is a volcanic cinder cone located in the Coconino National Forest of northern Arizona, United States, 25 miles northwest of Flagstaff. It rises 1,000 feet (300 m) above the surroundings terrain and is shaped like the letter "U", with its opening towards the west. Geological Survey (USGS) and Northern Arizona University scientists suggest that Red Mountain was formed in eruptions nearly 740,000 years ago.

== Geology ==
Red Mountain is a cinder cone in the San Francisco volcanic field that is noted for its red color and U shape when viewed from above. The cone was erupted from a volcanic vent that now sits under the intact material that comprises the U shape of the mountain. Overall, the pattern of volcanism is not symmetric about the vent suggesting either that lava was erupted under conditions of a strong west to east wind or late stage lava flows emanating from the vent may have rafted material out to the east. The origin of the large amphitheater that sits within the U is unclear. Predominate theories suggest it resulted from a steam eruption. This steam eruption may have resulted from the superheating of rainfall on cinders that were still hot. The well cemented cinders that make up the walls of the U may also result from interaction with rainwater. Chemical reactions driven by heated rainwater would also explain the variations in the color of the cinders.

The trail into the amphitheater contains small black grains that are often mistaken for Apache's tears (obsidian). These grains are actually large crystals of pyroxene and amphibole.
