= Lava River Cave (Arizona) =

Lava tube cave in Coconino County, Arizona

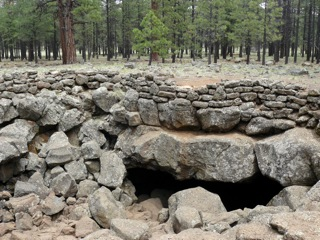
- Entrance to Lava River Cave
- Interactive map of Lava River Cave
- Location: Coconino National Forest, Coconino County, Arizona, U.S.
- Coordinates: 35°20′32.17″N 111°50′8.19″W
- Length: 3,820 feet (1,160 m)
- Access: Public

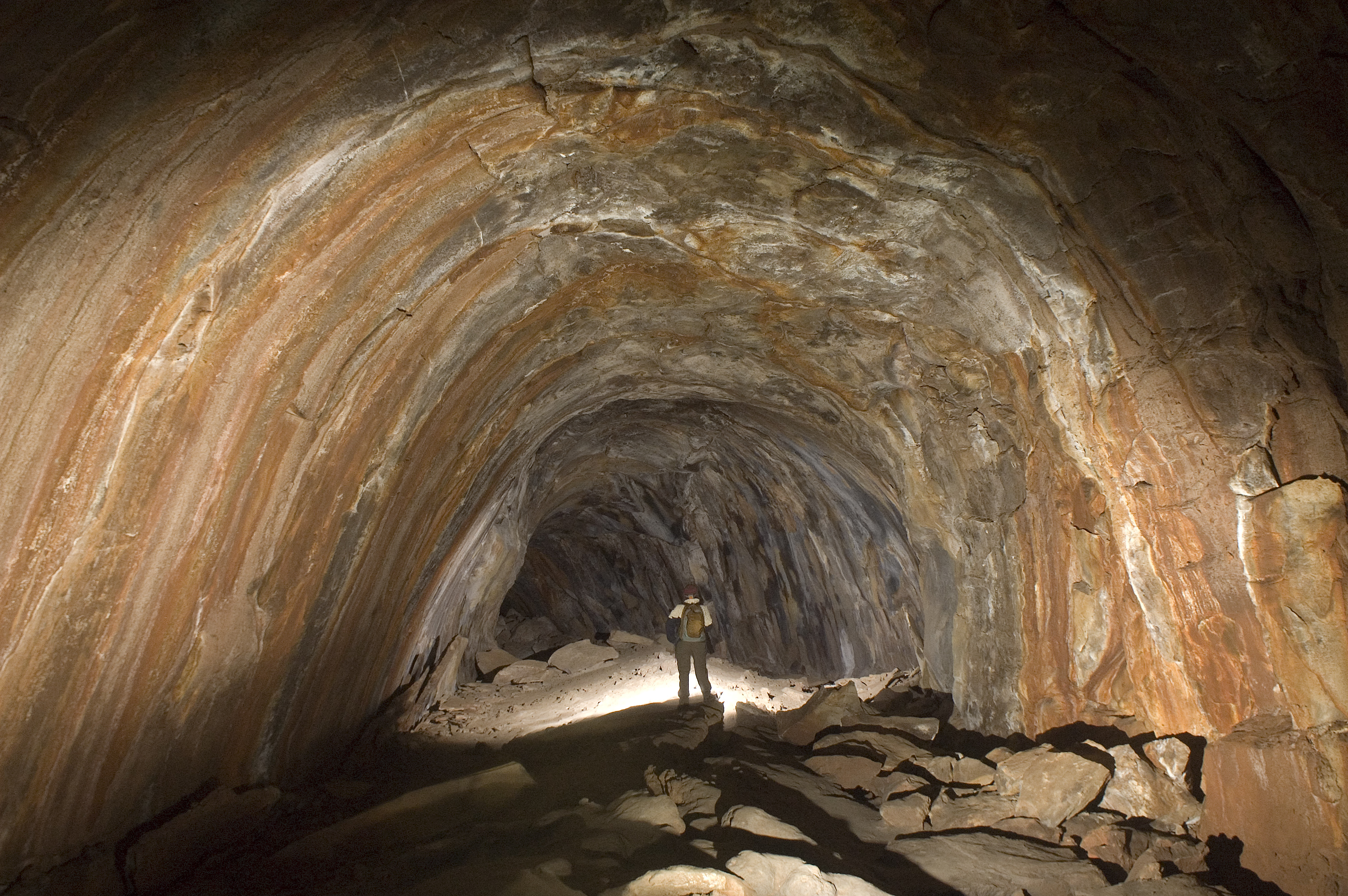
Multiflash image of the interior of Lava River Cave, Arizona

Lava River Cave is a lava tube in northern Arizona's Coconino National Forest. At approximately 0.75-mile (1.21 km) long, it is the longest cave of its kind known in Arizona. The cave was discovered by some lumbermen in 1915 and has historically been referred to as "Government Cave" due to its location on the eastern edge of Government Prairie and southeast of Government Peak. Today, Lava River Cave is freely accessible to the general public.

Geologists believe the cave was formed sometime between 650,000 and 700,000 years ago when molten lava erupted from a volcanic vent in nearby Hart Prairie. The top, sides and bottom of the flow cooled and solidified, while lava in the middle flowed out, leaving a hollow space to form the cave. Examples of both ʻAʻā and Pāhoehoe basaltic lava can be seen in the cave.

The cave is mostly dry, but due to the temperature change, there is a lot of condensation on the walls, ceiling and floor near the entrance, which makes it slippery. Temperatures inside are around 40 °F (5 °C) during the summer and stay between 35 and 45°F(2 and 7 °C) year round, and it is not uncommon for some of the rocks to be covered with ice. The cave can range in height from 30 feet (9.1 m) to only 2 to 3 feet (0.61 to 0.91 m), although the latter only at a side passage that rejoins the main tunnel. There are no light sources inside. It is recommended visitors have sturdy hiking boots, warm clothing, and multiple sources of light.

Litter and graffiti have been problems since the late 1960s. A major restoration effort was organized in May 1991. Almost all the litter was packed out and much of the graffiti removed at that time. Dogs should not be taken in the cave since there are only limited and very slow biological processes to render their urine and feces unobjectionable.

The entrance to the cave is around 14 miles (23 km) west of Flagstaff, Arizona. Being in Coconino National Forest, the cave is managed by the United States Forest Service. While the cave is open year-round, the dirt roads which lead there may be impassable to cars in winter months or during wet weather conditions, and Forest Roads 245 and 171 are typically closed in winter, so visitors may need to ski in. A recreation pass is required, which can be an America the Beautiful Interagency Pass, a Red Rock Pass, or a pass bought at the onsite fee machines.
