= San Francisco Mountains National Forest =

Former name of the Coconino National Forest in Arizona

Coordinates: 35°20′N 111°41′W

San Francisco Mountains National Forest was established as the San Francisco Mountains Forest Reserve by the United States General Land Office in Arizona on August 17, 1898 with 975,360 acres (3,947.1 km^{2}). After the transfer of federal forests to the U.S. Forest Service in 1905, it became a National Forest on March 4, 1907. On July 1, 1908 the entire forest was combined with other lands to create Coconino National Forest and the name was discontinued.
