= Courthouse Butte =

Natural feature in Yavapi County, Arizona

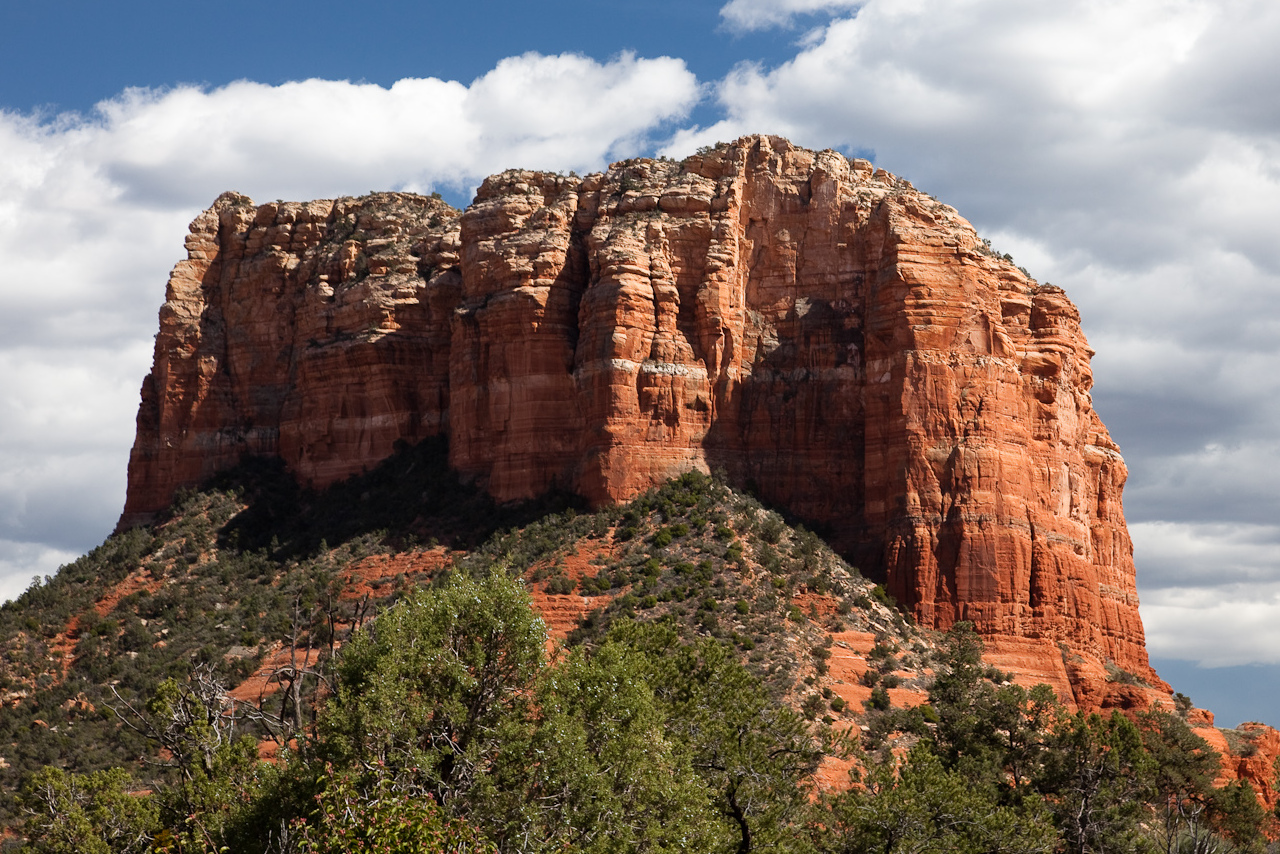

Highest point
- Elevation: 5,454 ft (1,662 m) NGVD 29
- Prominence: 971 ft (296 m)
- Coordinates: 34°48′10″N 111°45′17″W

Geography
- Location within Arizona Location within the United States
- Location: Yavapai County, Arizona, U.S.
- Topo map: USGS Sedona

Courthouse Butte is a butte just north of the Village of Oak Creek, Arizona, United States, south of Sedona in Yavapai County. Summit elevation is 5,454 feet (1,662 m). It is just east of Bell Rock.

There are many different trails to hike, bike, and run on around Courthouse Butte. One of the primary trails is a 4.5-mile trail starting from the North Bell Rock Trailhead. Courthouse Butte's first recorded ascent was done in the early 1900s. There are also many climbing routes ranging from 5.6 to 5.11+ with a bit of scrambling.

Geologically, Courthouse Butte is composed of horizontally bedded sedimentary rock of the Permian Supai Formation.

Courthouse Butte seen from Bell Rock Trail, looking northeast

== See also ==
- Cathedral Rock
- Schnebly Hill Formation
- Bell Rock
