= Red beds =

Sedimentary rocks with ferric oxides

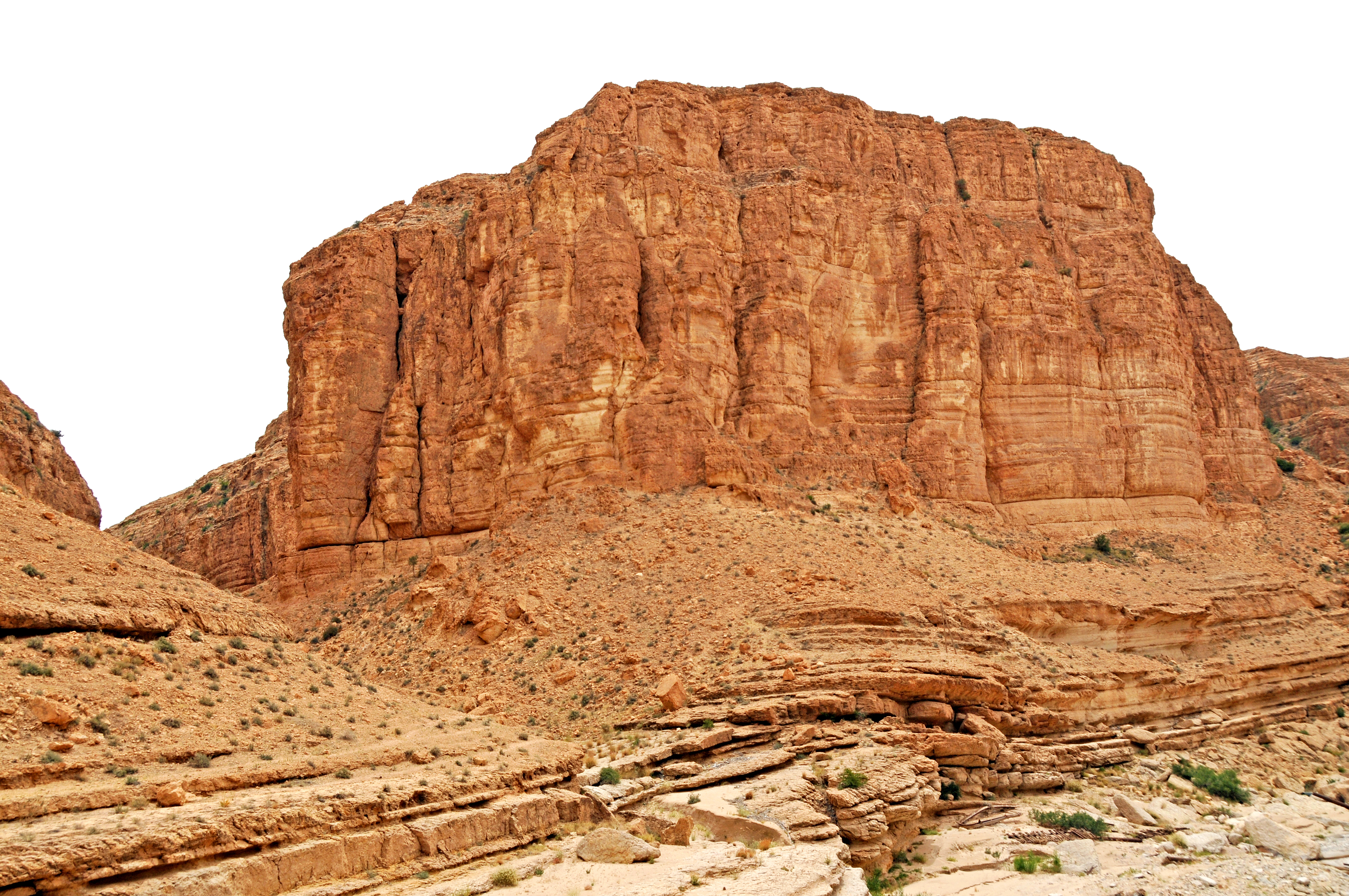
Red butte, Selja Gorges, Tunisia

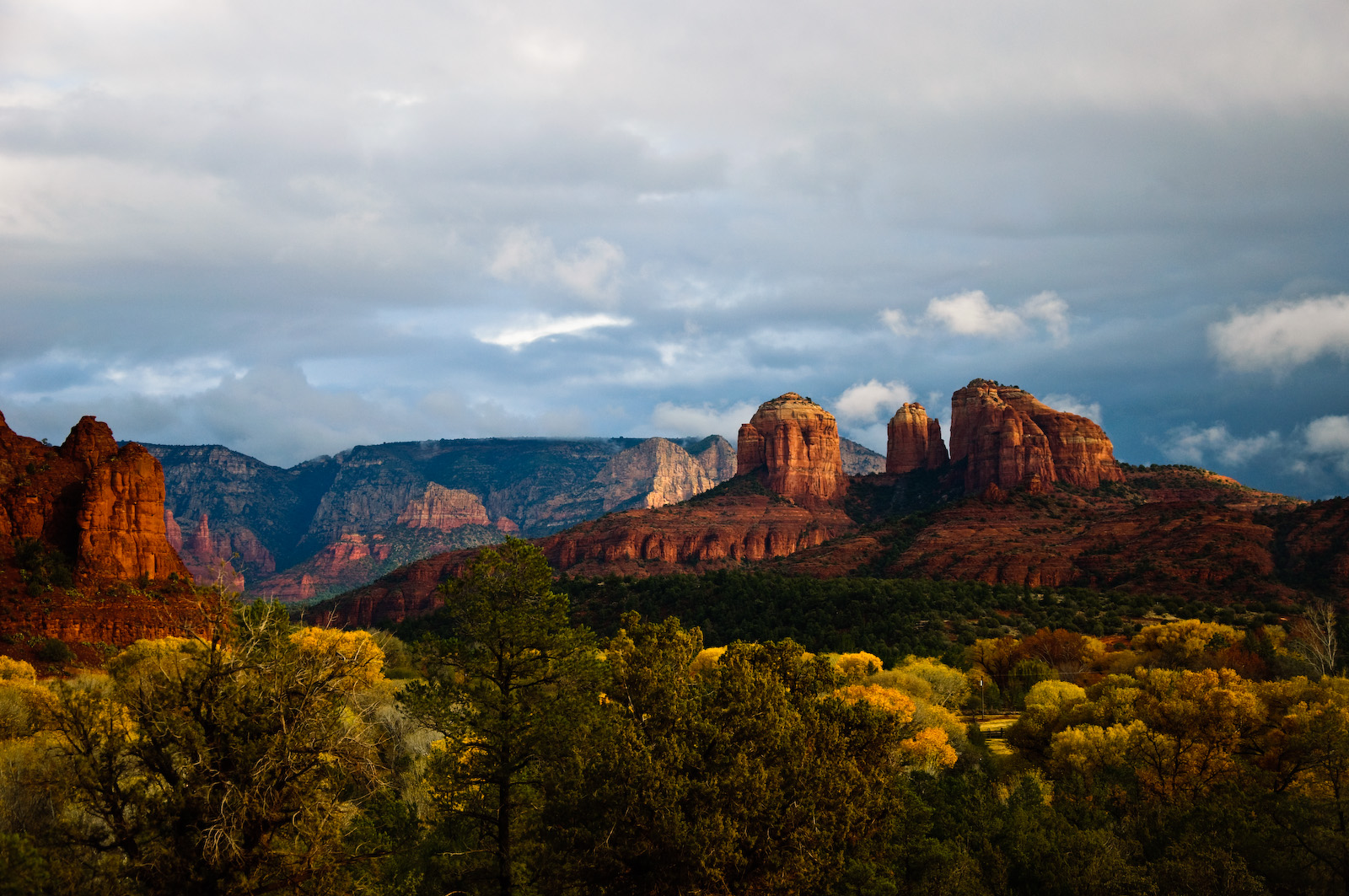
Cathedral Rock near Sedona, made of Permian redbeds

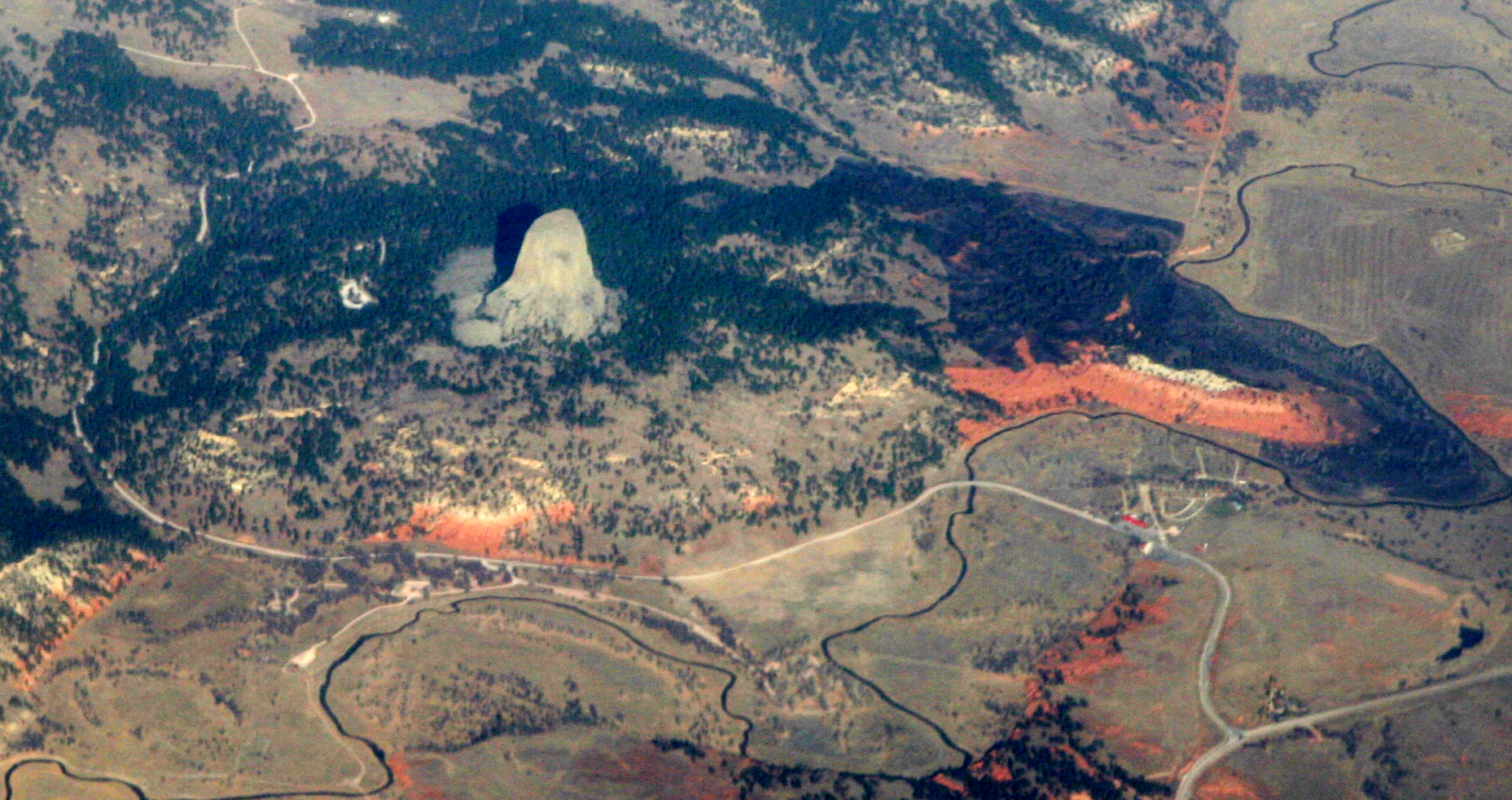
Red beds of the Permo-Triassic Spearfish Formation surround Devils Tower National Monument.

Red beds (or redbeds) are sedimentary rocks, typically consisting of sandstone, siltstone, and shale, that are predominantly red in color due to the presence of ferric oxides. Frequently, these red-colored sedimentary strata locally contain thin beds of conglomerate, marl, limestone, or some combination of these sedimentary rocks. The ferric oxides, which are responsible for the red color of red beds, typically occur as a coating on the grains of sediments comprising red beds. Classic examples of red beds are the Permian and Triassic strata of the western United States and the Devonian Old Red Sandstone facies of Europe.

== Primary red beds ==
Primary red beds may be formed by the erosion and redeposition of red soils or older red beds, but a fundamental problem with this hypothesis is the relative scarcity of red-colored source sediments of suitable age close to an area of red-bed sediments in Cheshire, England. Primary red beds may also form by in situ (early diagenetic) reddening of the sediment by the dehydration of brown or drab colored ferric hydroxides. These ferric hydroxides commonly include goethite (FeO-OH) and so-called "amorphous ferric hydroxide" or limonite. Much of this material may be the mineral ferrihydrite (Fe_{2}O_{3} H_{2}O).

This dehydration or "aging" process has been found to be intimately associated with pedogenesis in alluvial floodplains and desert environments. Goethite (ferric hydroxide) is normally unstable relative to hematite and, in the absence of water or at elevated temperature, will readily dehydrate according to the reaction:

2FeOOH (goethite) → Fe_{2}O_{3} (hematite) +H_{2}O

The Gibbs free energy (G) for the reaction goethite → hematite (at 250 °C) is −2.76 kJ/mol and G becomes increasingly negative with smaller particle size. Thus detrital ferric hydroxides, including goethite and ferrihydrite, will spontaneously transform into red-colored hematite pigment with time. This process not only accounts for the progressive reddening of alluvium but also the fact that older desert dune sands are more intensely reddened than their younger equivalents.

== Diagenetic red beds ==
Red beds may form during diagenesis. The key to this mechanism is the intrastratal alteration of ferromagnesian silicates by oxygenated groundwaters during burial. Walker's studies show that the hydrolysis of hornblende and other iron-bearing detritus follows Goldich dissolution series. This is controlled by the Gibbs free energy of the particular reaction. For example, the most easily altered material would be olivine: e.g.

$\ce{Fe_2SiO_4 \mathrm{(fayalite)} + O_2 -> Fe_2O_3 \mathrm{(hematite)} + SiO_2 \mathrm{(quartz)}}$, $E = -27.53 \mathrm{kJ/mol}$

A key feature of this process, and exemplified by the reaction, is the production of a suite of by-products which are precipitated as authigenic phases. These include mixed layer clays (illite – montmorillonite), quartz, potassium feldspar and carbonates as well as the pigmentary ferric oxides. Reddening progresses as the diagenetic alteration becomes more advanced, and is thus a time-dependent mechanism. The other implication is that reddening of this type is not specific to a particular depositional environment. However, the favourable conditions for diagenetic red bed formation i.e. positive E_{h} and neutral-alkaline pH are most commonly found in hot, semi-arid areas, and this is why red beds are traditionally associated with such climates.

== Secondary red beds ==
Secondary red beds are characterized by irregular color zonation, often related to sub-unconformity weathering profiles. The color boundaries may cross-cut lithological contacts and show more intense reddening adjacent to unconformities. Secondary reddening phases might be superimposed on earlier formed primary red beds in the Carboniferous of the southern North Sea. Post-diagenetic alteration may take place through reactions such as pyrite oxidation:

$\ce{3O_2 + 4 FeS_2 -> Fe_2O_3 \mathrm{(hematite)} + 8S}$, $E = -789 \mathrm{kJ/mol}$

and siderite oxidation:

$\ce{O_2 + 4FeCO_3 -> 2Fe_2O_3 \mathrm{(hematite)} + 4CO_2}$, $E = -346 \mathrm{kJ/mol}$

Secondary red beds formed in this way are an excellent example of telodiagenesis. They are linked to the uplift, erosion and surface weathering of previously deposited sediments and require conditions similar to primary and diagenetic red beds for their formation.

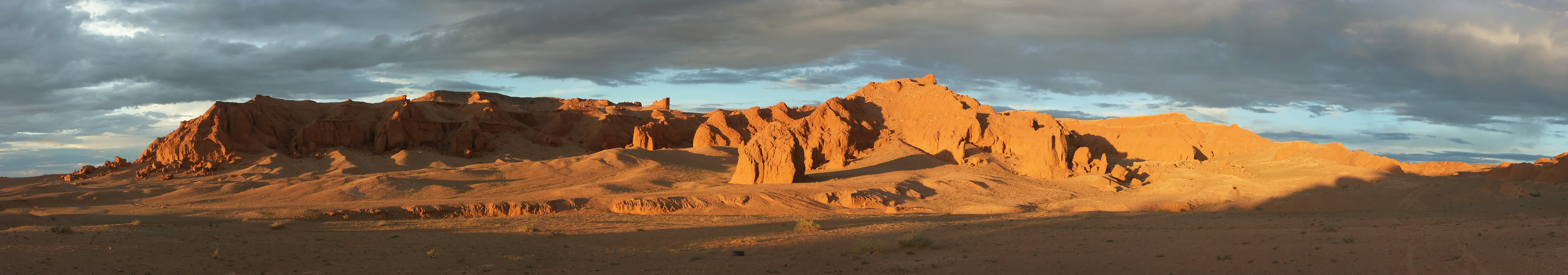
Panorama of the Flaming Cliffs of Mongolia

== See also ==
- Red Beds of Texas and Oklahoma
- Chugwater Formation
- Red Hills, Kansas
- Old Red Sandstone
- New Red Sandstone
