= Coconino National Forest =

United States protected area in Arizona

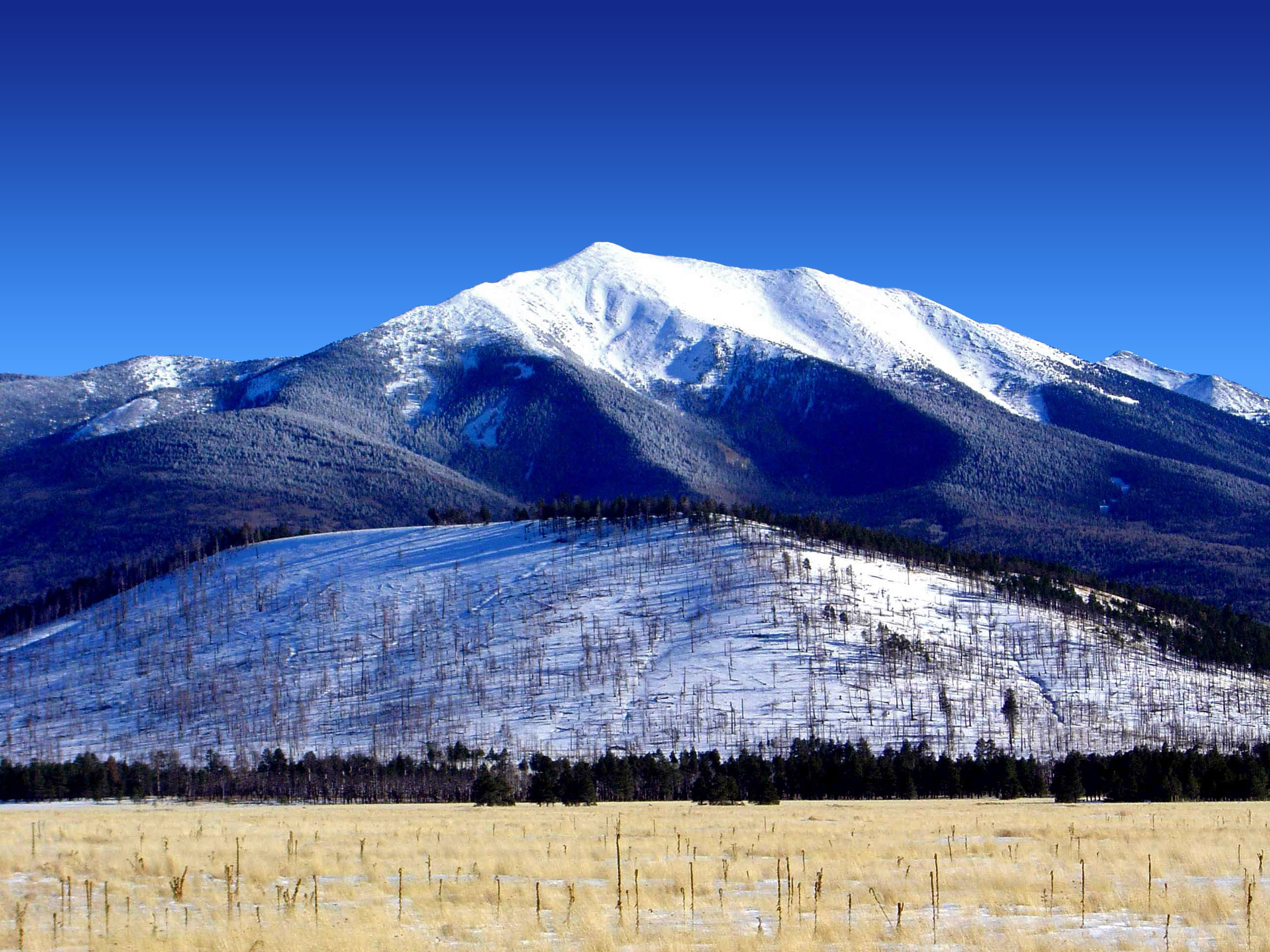
- San Francisco Peaks, winter
- Location in the United States
- Location: Coconino, Yavapai, and Gila counties, Arizona, US
- Nearest city: Flagstaff, Arizona
- Coordinates: 34°45′27″N 111°45′52″W
- Area: 1,856,038 acres (7,511.12 km^{2})
- Established: July 2, 1908
- Visitors: roughly 1,890,000 (in 2004)
- Governing body: U.S. Forest Service
- Website: www.fs.usda.gov/coconino

The Coconino National Forest is a 1.856-million acre (751,000 ha) United States National Forest located in northern Arizona in the vicinity of Flagstaff, with elevations ranging from 2,600 ft (800 m) to the highest point in Arizona at 12,633 ft (3,851 m) (Humphrey's Peak). Originally established in 1898 as the "San Francisco Mountains National Forest Reserve", the area was designated a U.S. National Forest by Pres. Theodore Roosevelt on July 2, 1908, when the San Francisco Mountains National Forest Reserve was merged with lands from other surrounding forest reserves to create the Coconino National Forest. Today, the Coconino National Forest contains diverse landscapes, including deserts, ponderosa pine forests, flatlands, mesas, alpine tundra, and ancient volcanic peaks.

The forest surrounds the towns of Sedona and Flagstaff and borders four other national forests; the Kaibab National Forest to the west and northwest, the Prescott National Forest to the southwest, the Tonto National Forest to the south, and the Apache-Sitgreaves National Forest to the southeast. The forest contains all or parts of nine designated wilderness areas, including the Kachina Peaks Wilderness, which includes the summit of the San Francisco Peaks. The headquarters are in Flagstaff. The Coconino National Forest consists of three districts: Flagstaff Ranger District, Mogollon Rim Ranger District, and Red Rock Ranger District, which have local ranger district offices in Flagstaff, Happy Jack, and Sedona.

== Etymology ==
Coconino is the word the Hopi use for Havasupai and Yavapai Indians. The Coconino National Forest was so named because it is located in the central portion of Coconino County.

== Geography ==
The elevation in the forest ranges from 2,600 feet (800 m) in the southern part of the forest near the Verde River to 12,633 feet (3,851 m) at the summit of Humphreys Peak, the highest point in the state of Arizona. Much of the forest is a high altitude plateau (average elevation is roughly 7,000 feet (2,100 m) on the plateau) that is located in the midst of the largest contiguous ponderosa pine forest in North America. The southern border of this plateau is the Mogollon Rim, a nearly 400 miles (600 km) long escarpment running across central Arizona that also marks the southern boundary of the Colorado Plateau. The Coconino National Forest is divided into three districts that each possess their distinct geography and environments.

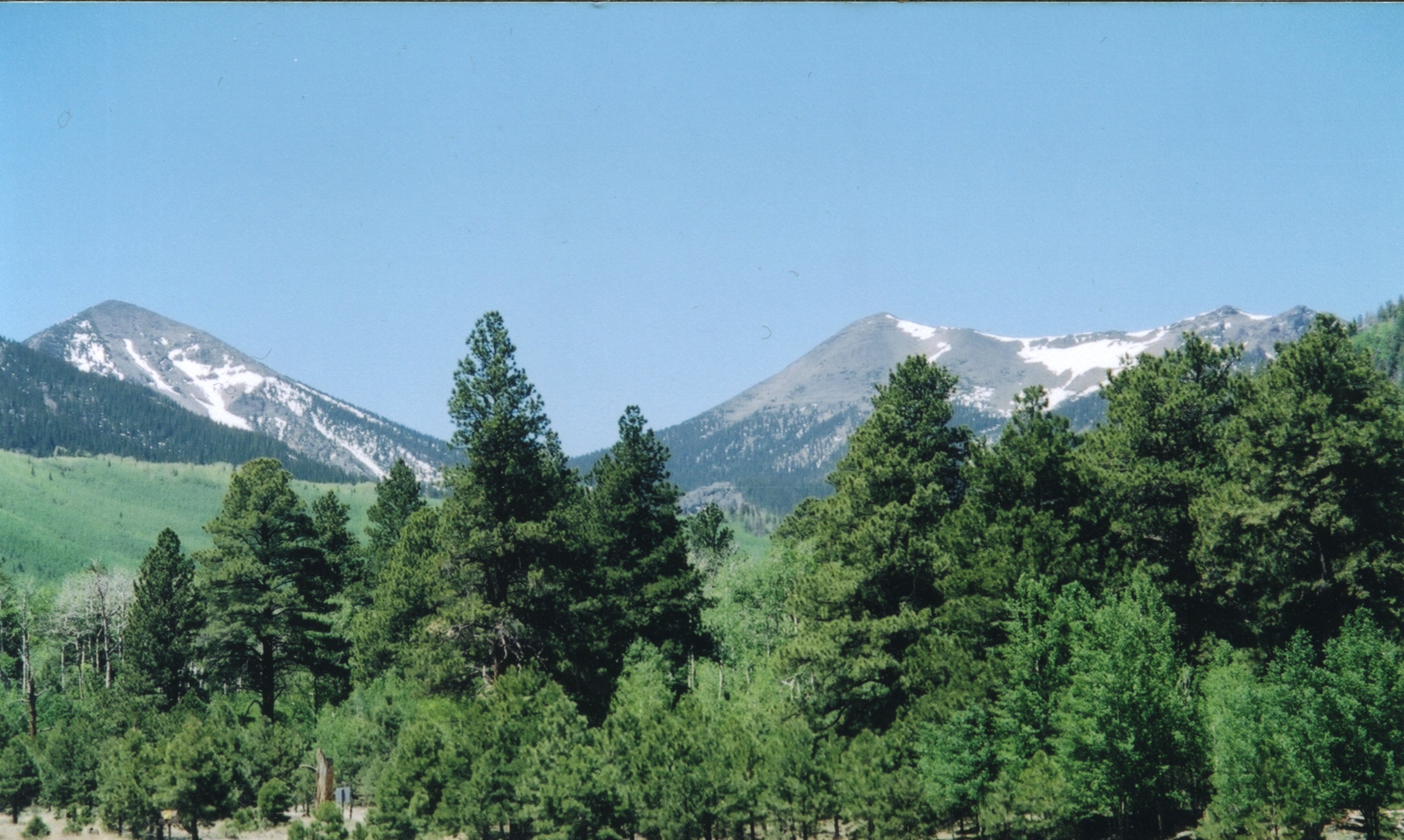
Inner Basin of San Francisco Peaks in the summer. Agassiz Peak at the center, and Fremont Peak at left.

The northernmost district, known as the Flagstaff District, is home to the San Francisco Peaks, an ancient group of volcanic summits. The highest peak, Humphreys Peak, is the highest point in Arizona at 12,633 feet (3,851 m). The second, third, and fourth highest peaks in Arizona are found nearby. The San Francisco Peaks are the dominant structure of the San Francisco Volcanic Field, an 1,800 square miles (4,700 km^{2}) volcanic field that contains more than 600 volcanic features. The Coconino National Forest encompasses a large portion of the volcanic field and so the forest landscape around Flagstaff is dotted with tree-covered cinder cones, lava flows, and lava tubes (such as Lava River Cave). The Flagstaff District surrounds two United States National Monuments near Flagstaff, Walnut Canyon National Monument and Sunset Crater Volcano National Monument the latter of which preserves the youngest cinder cone in the San Francisco Volcanic Field, Sunset Crater. The forest borders another National Monument, Wupatki National Monument on its northeast corner.

Located in the southern portion of the Flagstaff District is Mormon Lake, the largest natural lake in the state of Arizona. Several other natural lakes, including Ashurst Lake and Marshall Lake, dot the top of Anderson Mesa, an approximately 20-mile (32 km) long ridge that rises 200 to 400 feet (60−120 m) above the surrounding landscape. Anderson Mesa is best known for the branch of Lowell Observatory located along the edge of the mesa. At the base of the southwest side of Anderson Mesa are two narrow, manmade reservoirs constructed in the early 1900s, Upper Lake Mary and Lower Lake Mary. Upper Lake Mary contains water year round in all but the very driest years while Lower Lake Mary, located just to the northwest of Upper Lake Mary, usually resembles a wet meadow rather than a lake.

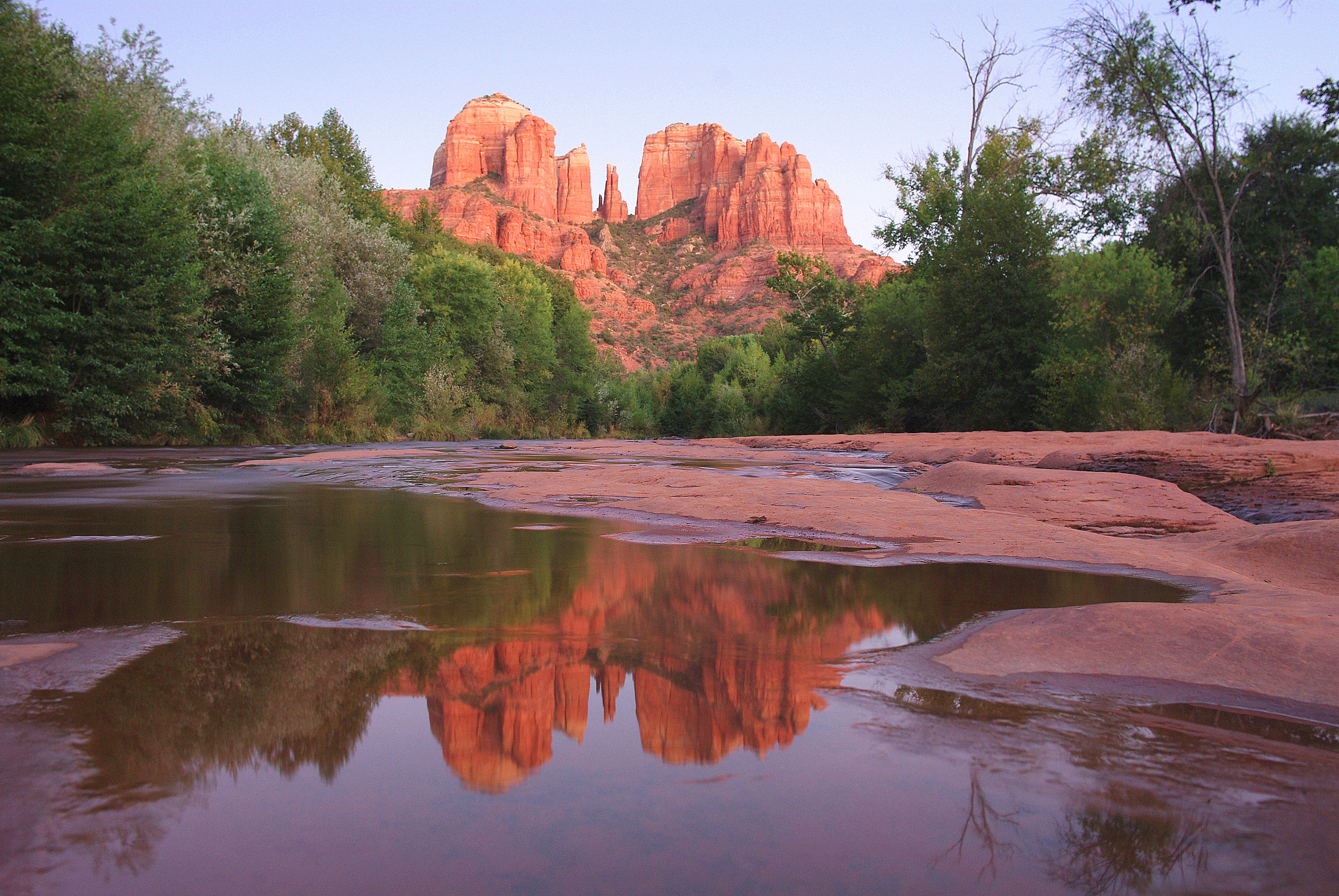
Cathedral Rock at Red Rock Crossing

The Red Rock district, centered on the town of Sedona, encompasses many of the famous red rock buttes and mesas, and canyons that have made Sedona famous as a resort town. Just north of Sedona is Oak Creek Canyon, one of the many large canyons located along the Mogollon Rim. Oak Creek Canyon is one of the most popular recreation destinations in the Coconino National Forest and along with Sedona is Arizona's second most popular tourist attraction, second only to the Grand Canyon. Oak Creek Canyon is also a popular leaf peeping area in the fall as it is one of the few areas in the forest where deciduous trees are the dominant vegetation type. This region is also home to Sycamore Canyon, the second largest canyon in Arizona. Elevations in this part of the forest are substantially lower (Sedona is at 4,500 feet (1,400 m) above sea level) than the rest of the forest resulting in higher temperatures year round.

The Third district is the Mogollon Rim District, located along the Mogollon Rim south of the Mormon Lake District and east of the Red Rock District. The landscape here resembles the Mormon Lake District with a number of small lakes and perennial streams scattered among a dense ponderosa pine forest. The southern boundary of the district is the edge of the Mogollon Rim where the Coconino National Forest borders the Tonto National Forest and Coconino County borders Gila County.

== Flora ==
Conifers and other evergreen plants are the dominant type of vegetation in the Coconino National Forest. Due in part to the dry climate, deciduous trees are rare except for in some moist areas along creeks and streams. While the ponderosa pine is by far the most common tree species in the Coconino National Forest, vegetation type varies depending on the elevation of a certain area.

At the lowest elevations, in the extreme southwestern portion of the forest, actual trees are scarce and the landscape is dominated by various small shrubs and sagebrushes. At elevations between 4,500 feet and 6,500 feet (1,400−2,000 m), which includes the area surrounding Sedona, various species of juniper including the alligator juniper and the Utah juniper are predominant. Other common tree and shrubs of this environment, often classified as the "juniper-pinyon woodlands", include Arizona cypress, manzanita, and pinyon pine. Hikers often encounter Parry's agave, yuccas, and prickly pear cacti in this region as well.

The huge stands of ponderosa pine on the forest are found primarily at elevations between 6,500 feet and 8,000 feet (2,000−2,400 m). Other species scattered among this region include gambel oak, quaking aspen, and Rocky Mountain Juniper.

The highest elevations in the forest are located in the San Francisco Peaks area north of Flagstaff. Here grow large conifers such as Engelmann spruce, blue spruce, subalpine fir, corkbark fir (a variety of subalpine fir found only in isolated areas of Arizona and New Mexico), Douglas-fir, bristlecone pine, and limber pine. Isolated stands of quaking aspen, usually the first tree to regenerate following a severe wildfire, are scattered across the mountain.

Above 11,000 feet (3,400 m) is found the only alpine tundra region in Arizona. Vegetation is scarce in this region. A few small bristlecone pines are found otherwise the area is above tree line and inhabited by small grasses, lichens, and alpine wildflowers. At this high elevation with exposure to extreme cold and strong winds, the alpine tundra mostly consists of boulder fields and loose gravel. The only trees that exist are short, shrubby, and wind-deformed.

== Wildfire ==
Wildfire is a major concern across the Coconino National Forest. Despite the abundance of green vegetation throughout the forest, the region is classified as a high desert. Flagstaff, located in the northern part of the forest, receives about 22 inches (560 mm) of precipitation annually—including an average annual snowfall of 100 inches (250 cm)—while other areas of the forest receive even less. The lack of any significant rainfall during the spring and early summer combined with the high temperatures and strong winds that are commonplace during that time of year results in fire danger that is usually defined as "very high" or "extreme" during the months of May through July. The danger of a major wildfire is increased by the fact that there are a number of cities and communities surrounded by forest land. Restrictions on campfires and smoking in the forest are common during peak fire season. Occasionally, the fire danger will become so great that the forest is closed to all public entry until substantial precipitation is received to minimize the danger of a stray spark setting off a destructive wildfire.

Over the past few years, the Coconino National Forest has increased its use of prescribed burns as a tool to prevent major wildfires. This strategy, along with forest thinning, has been especially widespread in areas of the forest that surround urban areas.

== Wilderness areas ==
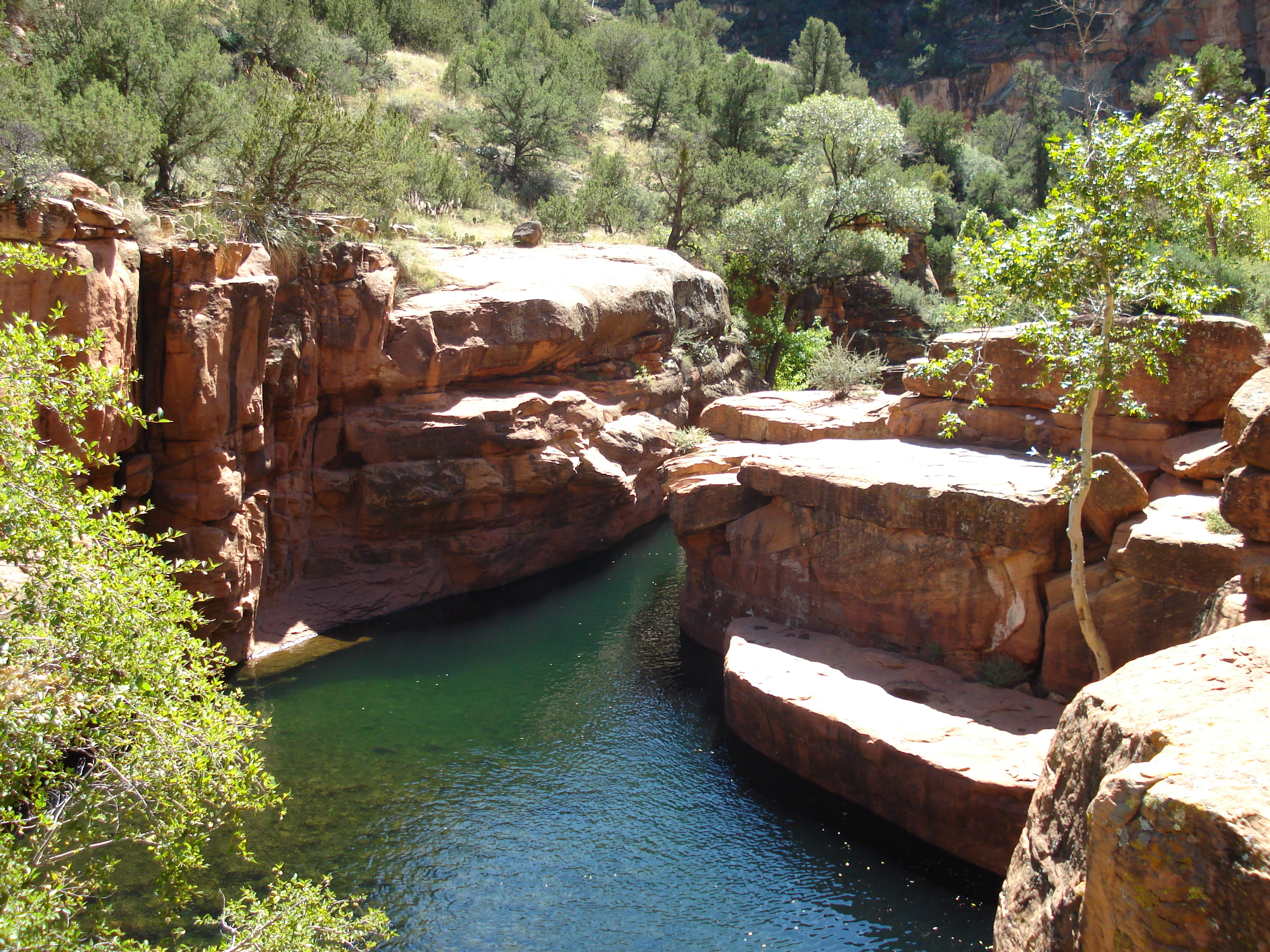
Wet Beaver Creek in Coconino National Forest

There are ten federally designated U.S. Wilderness Areas within or partially within the Coconino National Forest:

- Fossil Springs Wilderness
- Kachina Peaks Wilderness
- Kendrick Mountain Wilderness (mostly in Kaibab NF)
- Mazatzal Wilderness (mostly in Tonto NF)
- Munds Mountain Wilderness
- Red Rock-Secret Mountain Wilderness
- Strawberry Crater Wilderness
- Sycamore Canyon Wilderness (partly in Prescott NF and Kaibab NF)
- West Clear Creek Wilderness
- Wet Beaver Wilderness

== History ==
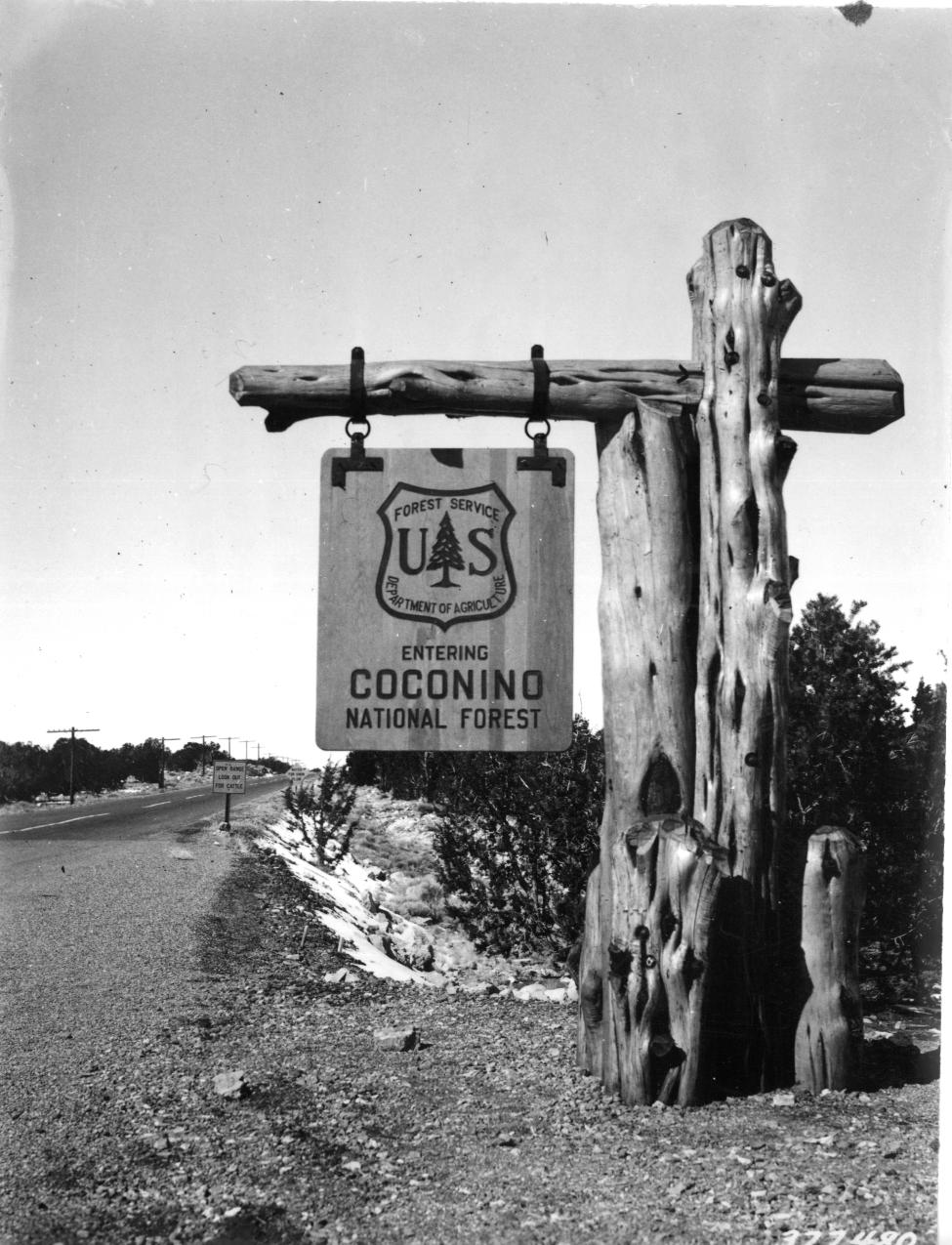
"Entering Coconino National Forest", Route 66, 1939

When the United States acquired the territory comprising Arizona and New Mexico by treaty with Mexico in 1848, those lands not already privately owned, including Spanish and Mexican land grants, nor reserved by treaty for the various Indian tribes, became a part of the "public domain" and open under various laws to settlement, purchase, and use.

In 1898, President William McKinley established the San Francisco Mountain Forest Reserve, at the request of Gifford Pinchot, head of the US Division of Forestry. Local reaction was hostile—citizens of Williams, Arizona held a mass protest, and the Williams News editorialized that the reserve "virtually destroys Coconino County."

In 1905, the Forest Reserves were transferred to the Department of Agriculture. Some 21 million acres (85,000 km^{2}) of public lands, almost one-eighth of the area of Arizona and New Mexico, were now to be administered by the new Forest Service.

In 1908, the Coconino National Forest was established from parts of the Tonto, Black Mesa, Grand Canyon, and entire San Francisco Mountains National Forests.

== See also ==
- List of national forests of the United States
- Red Mountain (Coconino County, Arizona)
- Tinder Fire
