= Bell Rock (Arizona) =

Landmark near Sedona, Arizona

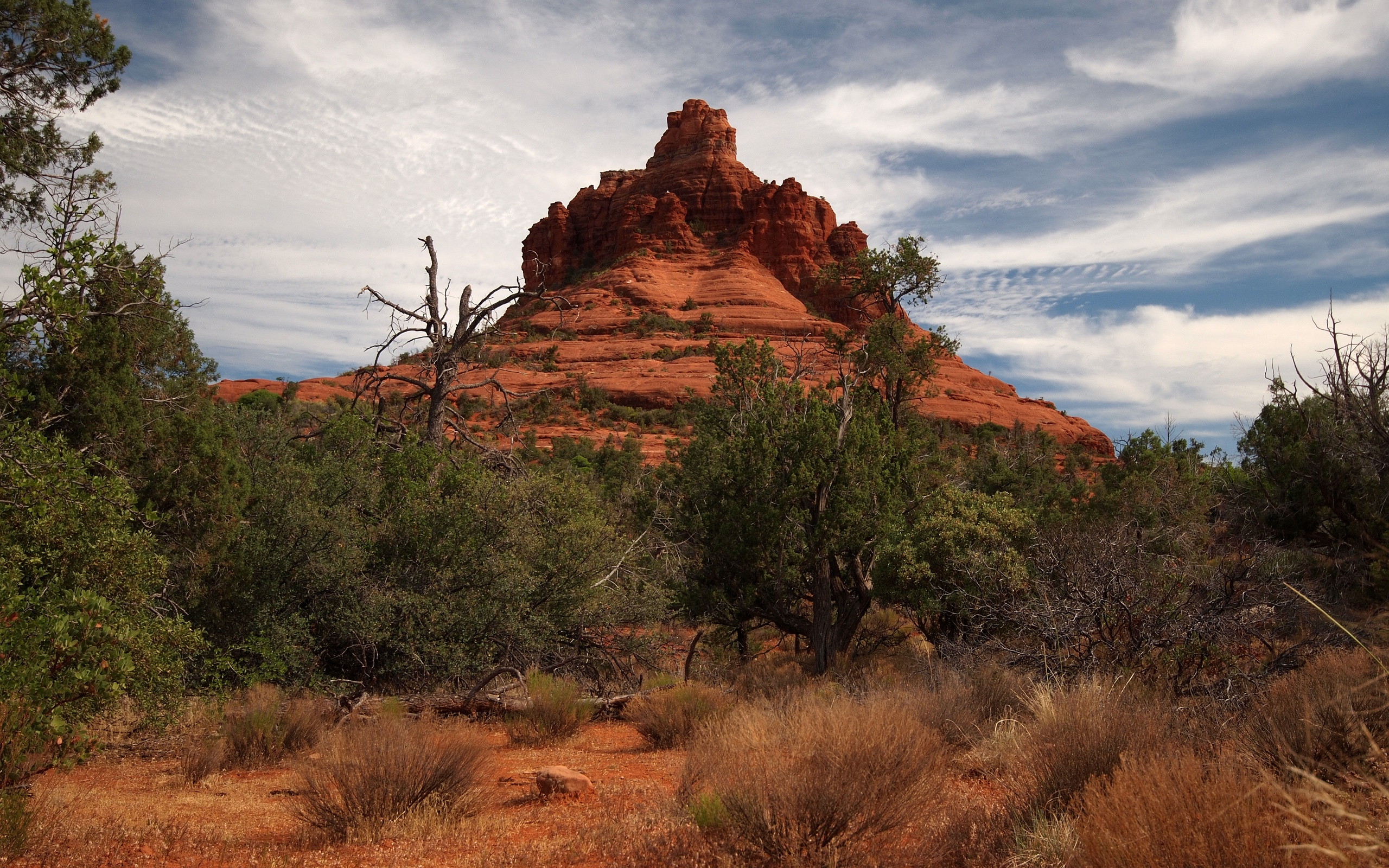

Highest point
- Elevation: 4,919 ft (1,499 m) NGVD 29
- Prominence: 479 ft (146 m)
- Coordinates: 34°48′01″N 111°45′53″W

Geography
- Location within Arizona
- Location: Yavapai, Arizona, U.S.
- Topo map: USGS Sedona

Bell Rock is a butte just north of the Village of Oak Creek, Arizona, United States, south of Sedona in Yavapai County. With an elevation at its summit of 4,919 feet (1,499 m), it is just west of Courthouse Butte. Its panoramic views make it a popular landmark and tourist attraction.

The most popular route is a moderate hike that reaches a small plateau on the northwest face of the butte. A challenging unmarked trail must be taken to reach the summit.

== Geology ==
Bell Rock is a butte composed of horizontally bedded sedimentary rock of the Permian Supai Formation.

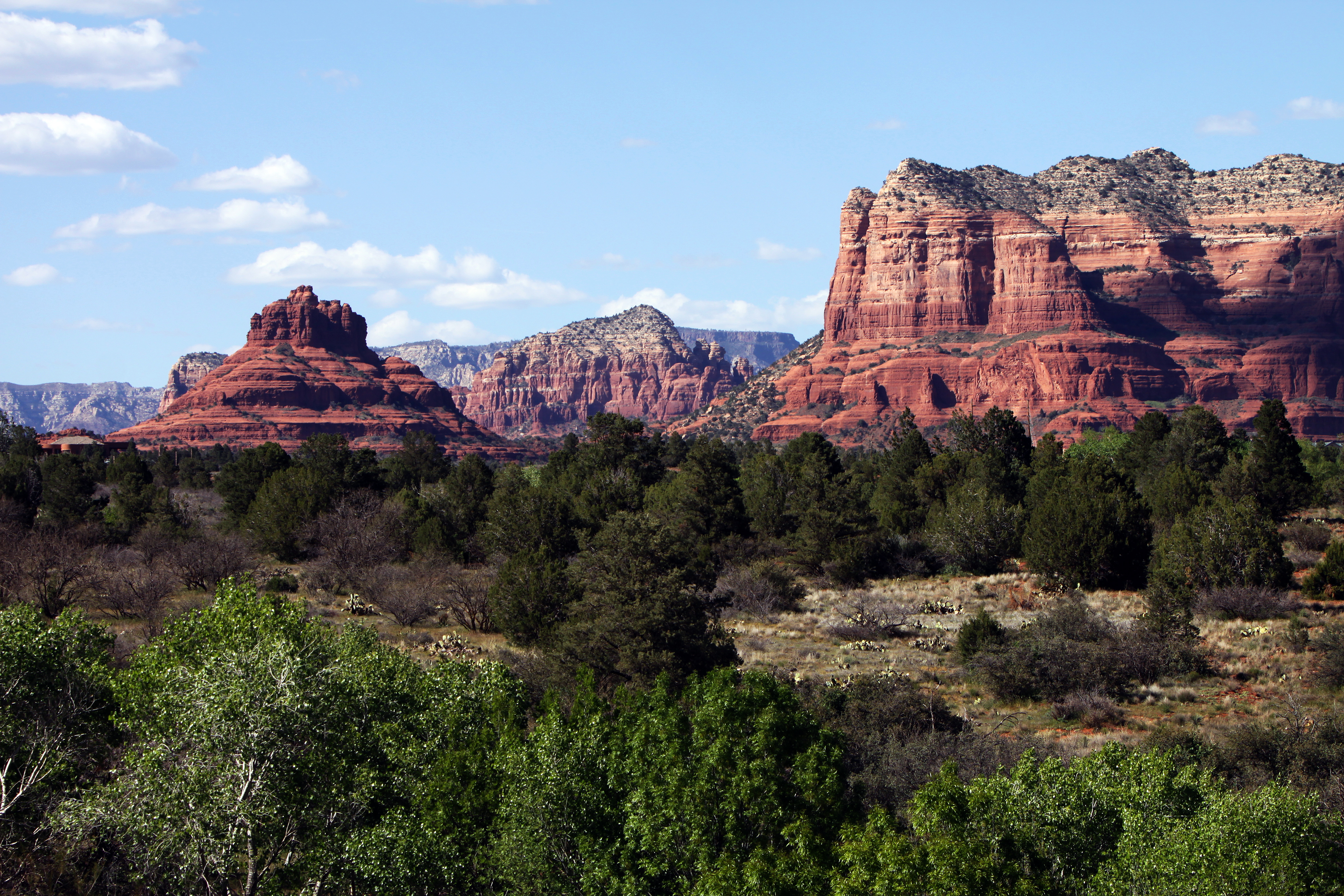
Bell Rock (at left), with Courthouse Butte to its right.

== See also ==
- Schnebly Hill Formation
