= Peeples Valley, Arizona =

CDP in Yavapai County, Arizona

- CDP
- Location in Yavapai County and the state of Arizona

- Location in the United States
- Coordinates: 34°15′42″N 112°46′07″W
- Country: United States
- State: Arizona
- County: Yavapai

Area
  - Total: 15.14 sq mi (39.21 km^{2})
  - Land: 15.14 sq mi (39.21 km^{2})
  - Water: 0 sq mi (0.00 km^{2})
- Elevation: 4,479 ft (1,365 m)

Population (2020)
  - Total: 499
  - Density: 32.9/sq mi (12.72/km^{2})
- Time zone: UTC-7 (MST)
- FIPS code: 04-53910
- GNIS feature ID: 2409049

Peeples Valley (Yavapai: Wachinivo) is a census-designated place (CDP) in Yavapai County, Arizona, United States. The population was 374 at the 2000 census.

Peeples Valley is named for prospector A. H. Peeples, who was the leader of the group that discovered Rich Hill, a gold deposit at Weaver, Arizona, in 1863.

== Geography ==
According to the United States Census Bureau, the CDP has a total area of 15.0 square miles (39 km^{2}), all land.

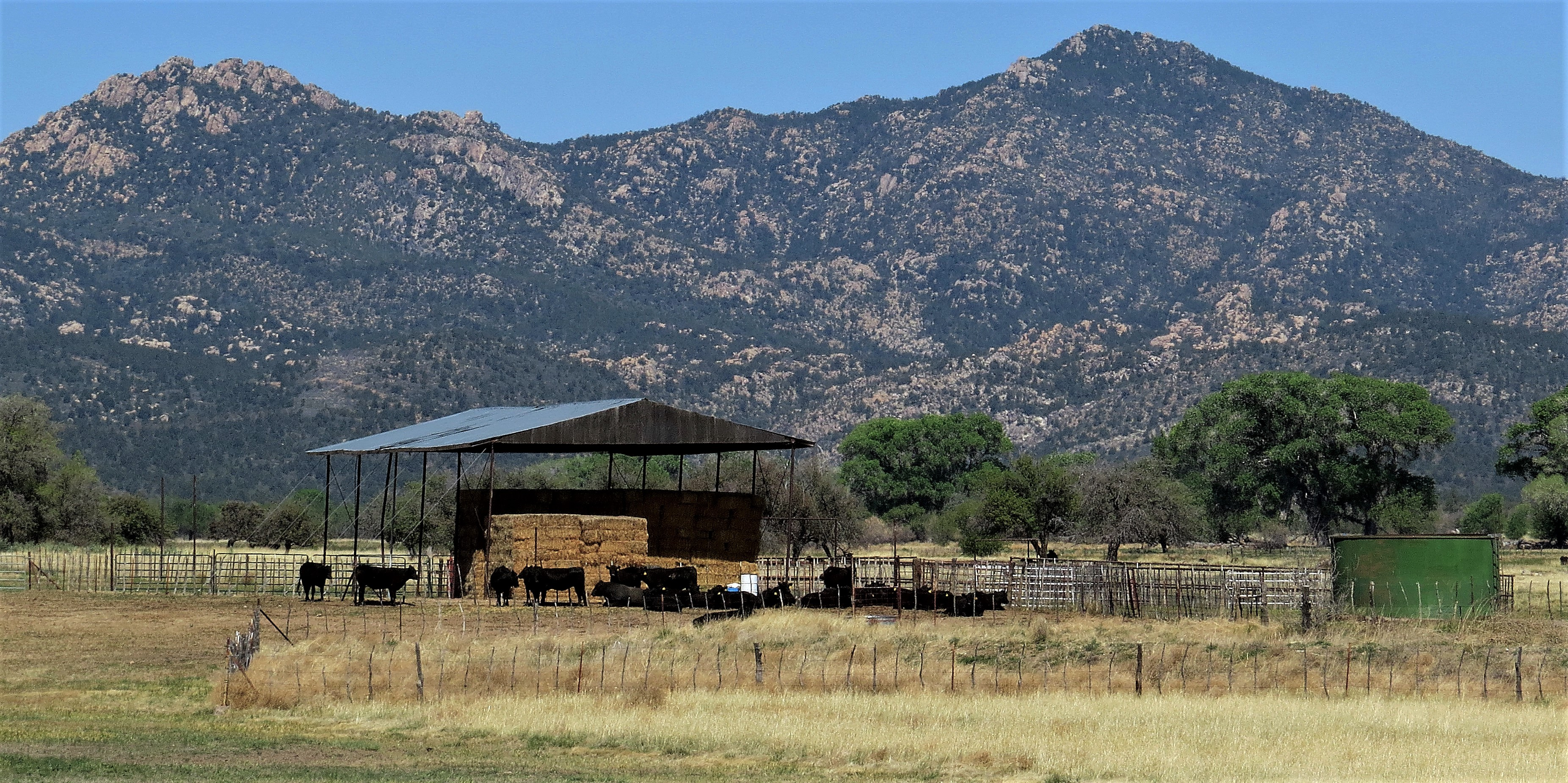
Peeples Valley ranch

== Government and infrastructure ==
A post office in Peeples Valley opened circa 1927, and moved to Yarnell Heights in 1929 while retaining its name.

== Education ==
It is in the Yarnell Elementary School District, which operates Model Creek School.

After the 8th grade, students move on to Prescott High School of the Prescott Unified School District. Previously students could choose between that school and Wickenburg High School of the Wickenburg Unified School District, but in order to reduce taxes, the district board removed the Wickenburg option in November 2018.

For a period of time the Peeples Valley School District sent students to the Yarnell district, as the former did not operate any schools. On July 1, 1980, the Yarnell district absorbed the Peeples Valley district.

== Demographics ==
Historical population
Census	Pop.	Note	%±
2020	499		—
U.S. Decennial Census

As of the census of 2000, there were 374 people, 176 households, and 127 families residing in the CDP. The population density was 24.9 inhabitants per square mile (9.6/km^{2}). There were 230 housing units at an average density of 15.3 per square mile (5.9/km^{2}). The racial makeup of the CDP was 91.4% White, 1.1% Black or African American, 1.1% Native American, 0.3% Asian, 2.7% from other races, and 3.5% from two or more races. 5.4% of the population were Hispanic or Latino of any race.

There were 176 households, out of which 14.2% had children under the age of 18 living with them, 64.2% were married couples living together, 6.3% had a female householder with no husband present, and 27.3% were non-families. 22.7% of all households were made up of individuals, and 11.9% had someone living alone who was 65 years of age or older. The average household size was 2.13 and the average family size was 2.42.

In the CDP, the population was spread out, with 14.4% under the age of 18, 2.4% from 18 to 24, 17.6% from 25 to 44, 31.8% from 45 to 64, and 33.7% who were 65 years of age or older. The median age was 57 years. For every 100 females, there were 92.8 males. For every 100 females age 18 and over, there were 90.5 males.

The median income for a household in the CDP was $24,861, and the median income for a family was $34,107. Males had a median income of $41,250 versus $18,750 for females. The per capita income for the CDP was $15,353. About 7.0% of families and 9.7% of the population were below the poverty line, including none of those under age 18 and 14.4% of those age 65 or over.
