= List of places in Arizona (F) =

This is a list of cities, towns, unincorporated communities, counties, and other places in the U.S. state of Arizona, which start with the letter F. This list is derived from the Geographic Names Information System, which has numerous errors, so it also includes many ghost towns and historical places that are not necessarily communities or actual populated places. This list also includes information on the number and names of counties in which the place lies, its lower and upper ZIP code bounds, if applicable, its U.S. Geological Survey (USGS) reference number(s) (called the GNIS), class as designated by the USGS, and incorporated community located in (if applicable).

== F ==
| Name of place | Number of counties | Principal county | GNIS #(s) | Class | Located in | ZIP code | |
| Name of place | Number of counties | Principal county | GNIS #(s) | Class | Located in | Lower | Upper |
|---|---|---|---|---|---|---|---|
| First Mesa | 1 | Navajo County | 2408213 | CDP | | | |
| Flagstaff | 1 | Coconino County | 2410509 | Civil (City) | | 86001 | |
| Florence | 1 | Pinal County | 2412633 | Civil (Town) | | 85232 | |
| Flowing Springs | 1 | Pima County | 2582783 | CDP | | | |
| Flowing Wells | 1 | Pima County | 2408221 | CDP | | | |
| Forepaugh | 1 | Maricopa County | 24419 | Populated Place | | | |
| Forest Lakes Estates | 1 | Coconino County | 37795 | Populated Place | | | |
| Forrest | 1 | Cochise County | 24420 | Populated Place | | | |
| Fort Apache | 1 | Navajo County | 2582784 | CDP | | 85926 | |
| Fort Defiance | 1 | Apache County | 2408236 | CDP | | 86504 | |
| Fort Huachuca | 1 | Cochise County | 2512200 | Military | | 85613 | |
| Fort McDowell | 1 | Maricopa County | 29117 | Populated Place | | 85264 | |
| Fort McDowell Yavapai Nation | 1 | Maricopa County | 36978 | Civil (Indian reservation) | | 85253 | |
| Fort Misery | 1 | Yavapai County | 29118 | Populated Place | | | |
| Fort Mohave | 1 | Mohave County | 2628855 | CDP | | 86427 | |
| Fort Mojave Indian Reservation | 1 | Mohave County | 24003 | Civil (Indian reservation) | | 92363 | |
| Fort Thomas | 1 | Graham County | 2582785 | CDP | | 85536 | |
| Fort Tuthill | 1 | Coconino County | 29119 | Populated Place | | | |
| Fortuna | 1 | Yuma County | 24422 | Populated Place | Fortuna Foothills | | |
| Fortuna Foothills | 1 | Yuma County | 2408247 | CDP | | | |
| Fort Valley | 1 | Coconino County | 2582786 | CDP | | | |
| Fort Whipple | 1 | Yavapai County | 42739 | Populated Place | Prescott | | |
| Fort Yuma Indian Reservation | 1 | Yuma County | 242378 | Civil (Indian reservation) | | 85344 | |
| Fountain Hills | 1 | Maricopa County | 2412647 | Civil (Town) | | 85268 | |
| Franconia | 1 | Mohave County | 24424 | Populated Place | | | |
| Franklin | 1 | Greenlee County | 2582787 | CDP | | 85534 | |
| Frazier Wells | 1 | Coconino County | 4832 | Populated Place | | | |
| Fredonia | 1 | Coconino County | 2412657 | Civil (Town) | | 86022 | |
| Freedom Acres | 1 | Gila County | 2582788 | CDP | | | |
| Friendly Corners | 1 | Pinal County | 4861 | Populated Place | | 85231 | |
| Fry | 1 | Cochise County | 4869 | Populated Place | Sierra Vista | 85635 | |
