= Yarnell, Arizona =

CDP in Yavapai County, Arizona

- CDP
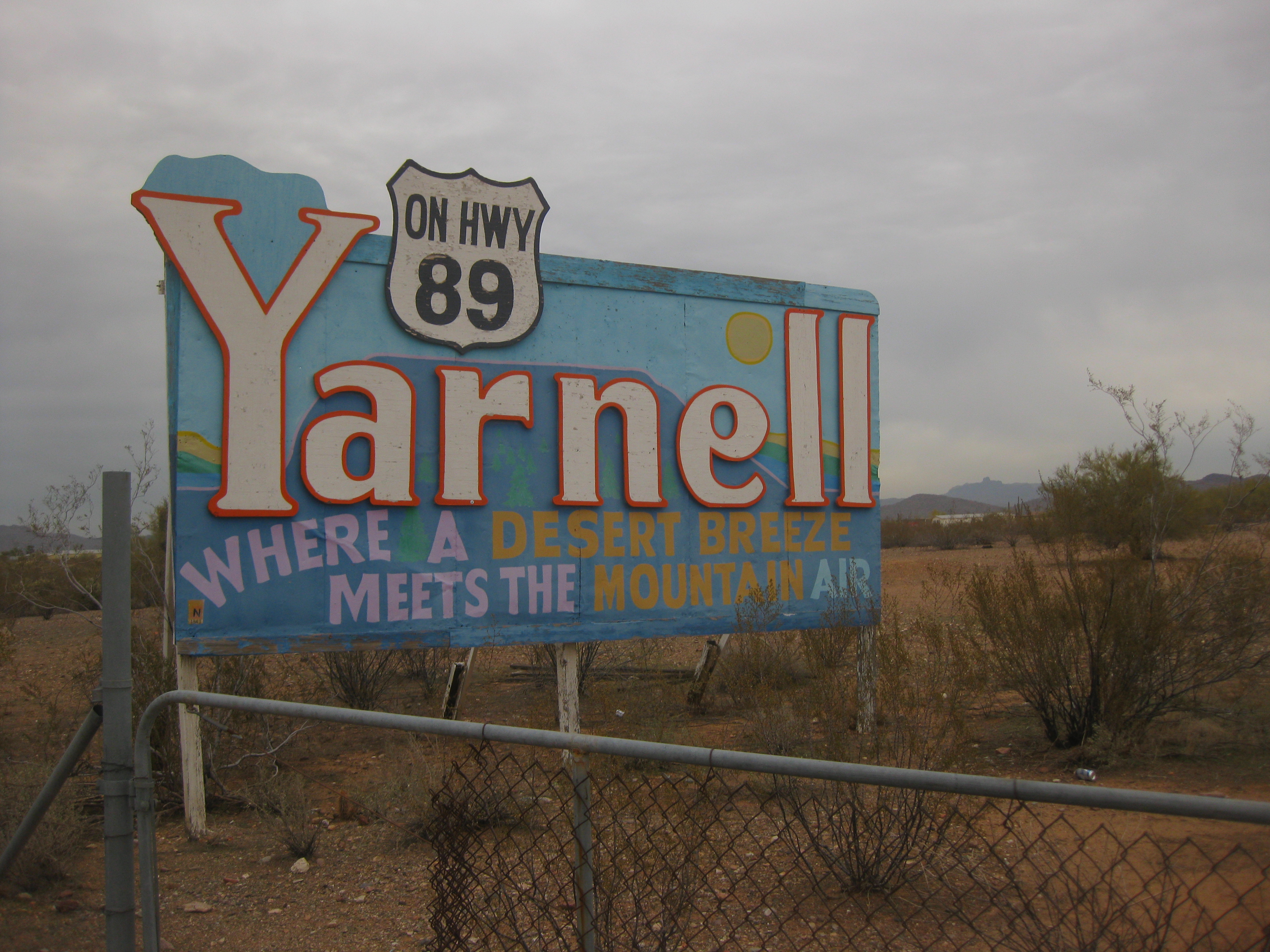
- Sign at entrance to Yarnell

- Location in Yavapai County and the state of Arizona

- Location in the United States
- Coordinates: 34°13′21″N 112°44′59″W
- Country: United States
- State: Arizona
- County: Yavapai

Area
  - Total: 8.87 sq mi (22.98 km^{2})
  - Land: 8.87 sq mi (22.98 km^{2})
  - Water: 0 sq mi (0.00 km^{2})
- Elevation: 4,780 ft (1,457 m)

Population (2020)
  - Total: 570
  - Density: 64/sq mi (24.8/km^{2})
- Time zone: UTC-7 (MST)
- ZIP code: 85362
- Area code: 928
- FIPS code: 04-84980
- GNIS feature ID: 0014039

Yarnell is a census-designated place (CDP) in Yavapai County, Arizona, United States. The population of Yarnell was 649 at the 2010 census. Yarnell's economy is based on ranching, mining and services to travelers and retirees. Peeples Valley, three miles north, is closely linked to Yarnell.

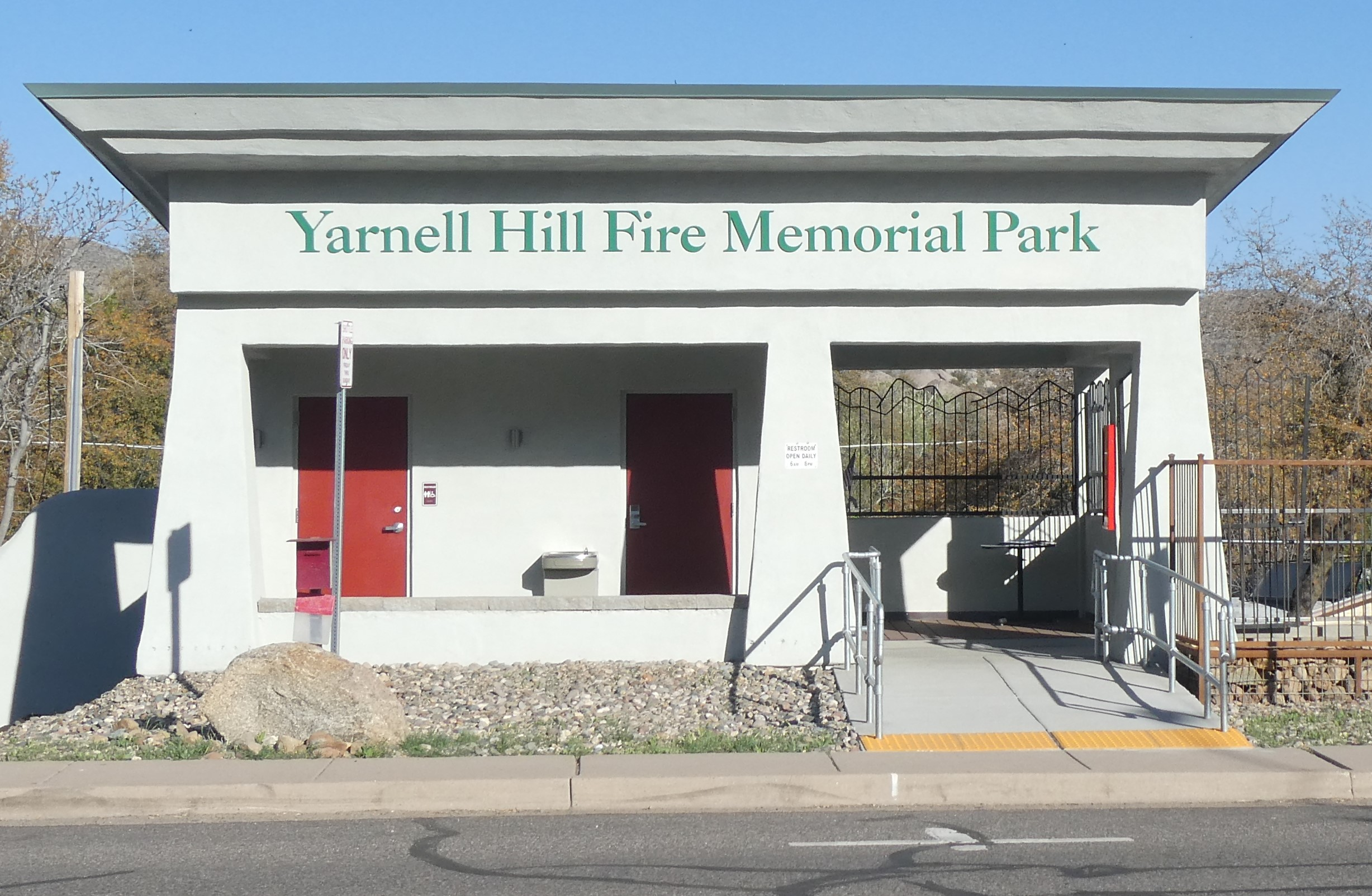
View from Arizona State Highway 89

== History ==
Gold was discovered in Yarnell in about 1865 by Charles Genung (1839–1916), a well-known area pioneer. The community is named after Harrison Yarnell, a later prospector, who discovered the Yarnell mine in 1873. Old U.S. Route 89 (now State Route 89), which goes through Yarnell, was paved in 1933, and for many years was the main highway from Phoenix to Wickenburg, Prescott and northern Arizona.

On June 30, 2013, the Yarnell Hill Fire destroyed half of the town and killed 19 firefighters.

== Geography ==
Yarnell is located at 34°13′21″N 112°44′59″W (34.222569, -112.749608).

According to the United States Census Bureau, the CDP has a total area of 8.8 square miles (23 km^{2}), all land.

== Attractions ==
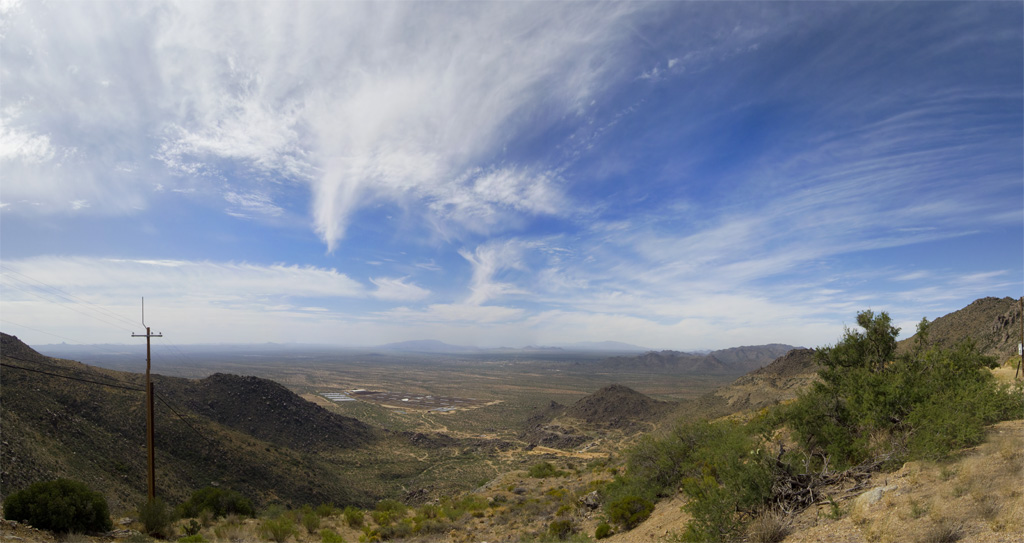
Top of Yarnell Hill looking toward Wickenburg.

Yarnell Hill, which Highway 89 descends 1,300 feet in four miles, is a popular scenic drive.

The newest Arizona State Park, Granite Mountain Hotshots Memorial State Park, is just three miles south of Yarnell on State Highway 89. It was dedicated in 2016 as a place to remember the 19 Granite Mountain Hotshot Firefighters who were lost on June 30, 2013, while fighting the Yarnell Hill Fire.

Yarnell Hill Fire Memorial Park is located in downtown Yarnell across from the Yarnell Fire Department’s administration building. Several etched metal signs give information about the Fire and about how it affected the citizens of Yarnell and Peeples Valley.

The Shrine of St. Joseph of the Mountains is a Catholic religious monument which features statuary hidden in the boulders. A short trail leads visitors through the stations of the cross.

The ghost towns of Stanton, Octave and Congress are nearby, as well as Harper's Flat. Rich Hill in Weaver was the richest placer gold discovery in Arizona, discovered in 1863 by a party led by the mountain man Pauline Weaver and the prospector A. H. Peeples.

== Demographics ==
Historical population
Census	Pop.	Note	%±
2000	645		—
2010	649		0.6%
2020	570		−12.2%
U.S. Decennial Census

Yarnell CDP, Arizona - Racial and ethnic composition Note: the US Census treats Hispanic/Latino as an ethnic category. This table excludes Latinos from the racial categories and assigns them to a separate category. Hispanics/Latinos may be of any race.
Race / Ethnicity (NH = Non-Hispanic)	2020	2010	2000
White alone (NH)	83.5% (476)	90% (584)	96.1% (620)
Black alone (NH)	2.5% (14)	0.3% (2)	0.2% (1)
American Indian alone (NH)	1.4% (8)	0.9% (6)	0.2% (1)
Asian alone (NH)	0.4% (2)	0.2% (1)	0% (0)
Pacific Islander alone (NH)	0% (0)	0% (0)	0.2% (1)
Other race alone (NH)	0.4% (2)	0% (0)	0% (0)
Multiracial (NH)	2.8% (16)	2.3% (15)	1.6% (10)
Hispanic/Latino (any race)	9.1% (52)	6.3% (41)	1.9% (12)

The most reported detailed racial/ethnic groups in 2020 were German (23.2%), English (18.4%), Irish (12.8%), and Mexican (6.1%).

At the 2000 census, there were 645 people, 359 households and 188 families residing in the CDP. The population density was 73.1 inhabitants per square mile (28.2/km^{2}). There were 516 housing units at an average density of 58.5 per square mile (22.6/km^{2}). The racial makeup of the CDP was 96.9% White, 0.2% Black or African American, 0.2% Native American, 0.2% Pacific Islander, 1.1% from other races, and 1.6% from two or more races. 1.9% of the population were Hispanic or Latino of any race.

There were 359 households, of which 10.6% had children under the age of 18 living with them, 41.8% were married couples living together, 6.1% had a female householder with no husband present, and 47.6% were non-families. 40.9% of all households were made up of individuals, and 17.5% had someone living alone who was 65 years of age or older. The average household size was 1.80 and the average family size was 2.35.

11.2% of the population were under the age of 18, 1.7% from 18 to 24, 16.4% from 25 to 44, 37.7% from 45 to 64, and 33.0% who were 65 years of age or older. The median age was 57 years. For every 100 females, there were 114.3 males. For every 100 females age 18 and over, there were 113.0 males.

The median household income was $24,792 and the median family income was $35,417. Males had a median income of $33,333 compared with $23,750 for females. The per capita income for the CDP was $18,837. About 11.5% of families and 14.0% of the population were below the poverty line, including 18.0% of those under age 18 and 5.0% of those age 65 or over.

== Education ==
The Yarnell Elementary School District 52 serves students in grades Pre-K to 8 for most of the CDP, while a section of the CDP lies in the Congress Elementary School District. The former district operates Model Creek School.

After the 8th grade, Model Creek students move on to Prescott High School of the Prescott Unified School District. Previously Model Creek students could choose between that school and Wickenburg High School of the Wickenburg Unified School District, but in order to reduce taxes, the Yarnell Elementary District board removed the Wickenburg option in November 2018. The Congress district sends high school students to Wickenburg High. Congress district students attended Wickenburg USD for all grade levels prior to 2001, when the Congress K-8 facility opened.
