= Wilhoit, Arizona =

Census-designated place in Yavapai County, Arizona, United States

- CDP
- Abandoned gas station in Wilhoit, 1991

- Location in Yavapai County and the state of Arizona

- Location in the United States
- Coordinates: 34°24′04″N 112°38′10″W
- Country: United States
- State: Arizona
- County: Yavapai

Area
  - Total: 15.69 sq mi (40.63 km^{2})
  - Land: 15.69 sq mi (40.63 km^{2})
  - Water: 0 sq mi (0.00 km^{2})
- Elevation: 4,590 ft (1,400 m)

Population (2020)
  - Total: 864
  - Density: 55.1/sq mi (21.26/km^{2})
- Time zone: UTC-7 (MST)
- ZIP code: 86332
- Area code: 928
- FIPS code: 04-82950
- GNIS feature ID: 2409594

Wilhoit is a census-designated place (CDP) in Yavapai County, Arizona, United States. The population was 664 at the 2000 census.

== History ==
In the mid-1920s, a road was being built to connect Phoenix and Prescott, by way of Congress and Yarnell. There, a man by the name of Frank Wilhoit (1891-1964) built culverts for the road, and then later homesteaded that area with his wife, Christina Wilhoit (1889-1975). The Wilhoit family then built a gas station and garage on one side of the road, and a restaurant on the other. Mr. Wilhoit operated the garage and Mrs. Wilhoit operated the restaurant which remained busy, as foreigners to the town needed a place to eat, and that they also needed an auto-garage considering tires in the 1920s did not hold up well on gravel roads. Mr. and Mrs. Wilhoit would later leave the area and move to Wickenburg around 1930, but the small area retained the name and the area later evolved into a place well known for its mobile homes.

== Geography ==
According to the United States Census Bureau, the CDP has a total area of 15.7 square miles (41 km^{2}), all land.

== Demographics ==
Historical population
Census	Pop.	Note	%±
2020	864		—
U.S. Decennial Census

As of the census of 2000, there were 664 people, 298 households, and 187 families living in the CDP. The population density was 42.4 inhabitants per square mile (16.4/km^{2}). There were 363 housing units at an average density of 23.2 per square mile (9.0/km^{2}). The racial makeup of the CDP was 95.6% White, 0.9% Native American, 0.3% Asian, 1.8% from other races, and 1.4% from two or more races. 5.7% of the population were Hispanic or Latino of any race.

There were 298 households, out of which 17.1% had children under the age of 18 living with them, 55.0% were married couples living together, 6.7% had a female householder with no husband present, and 37.2% were non-families. 32.2% of all households were made up of individuals, and 16.1% had someone living alone who was 65 years of age or older. The average household size was 2.23 and the average family size was 2.81.

In the CDP, the population was spread out, with 19.1% under the age of 18, 4.5% from 18 to 24, 17.6% from 25 to 44, 33.7% from 45 to 64, and 25.0% who were 65 years of age or older. The median age was 50 years. For every 100 females, there were 90.3 males. For every 100 females age 18 and over, there were 95.3 males.

The median income for a household in the CDP was $23,500, and the median income for a family was $30,938. Males had a median income of $27,222 versus $25,938 for females. The per capita income for the CDP was $14,466. About 10.1% of families and 16.8% of the population were below the poverty line, including 23.1% of those under age 18 and 9.7% of those age 65 or over.

== Education ==
It is in the Kirkland Elementary School District. As of 1976 the Prescott Unified School District takes secondary students from the Kirkland district, as it is required to under law. The district operates Prescott High School.

== See also ==
- List of census-designated places in Arizona
