= Skull Valley =

Skull Valley may refer to:

== Valleys ==
- Skull Valley (Utah), a valley in Tooele County, Utah, United States
  - Skull Valley Indian Reservation
- Skull Valley (Arizona), a valley in Yavapai County, Arizona, United States
  - Skull Valley, Arizona, an unincorporated community in the Skull Valley

== Other uses ==
- Skull Valley Elementary School District, public school district in Skull Valley, Arizona
  - Skull Valley Elementary School, the only school in the Skull Valley Elementary School District
- Skull Valley Road, Utah State Route 196, which runs the length of the Skull Valley in Utah
