= Williamson Valley =

Williamson Valley may refer to:

- Williamson Valley (Arizona) in Yavapai County, Arizona
- Williamson Valley (California) in San Benito County, California
