= Cape May Point School District =

School district in New Jersey, US

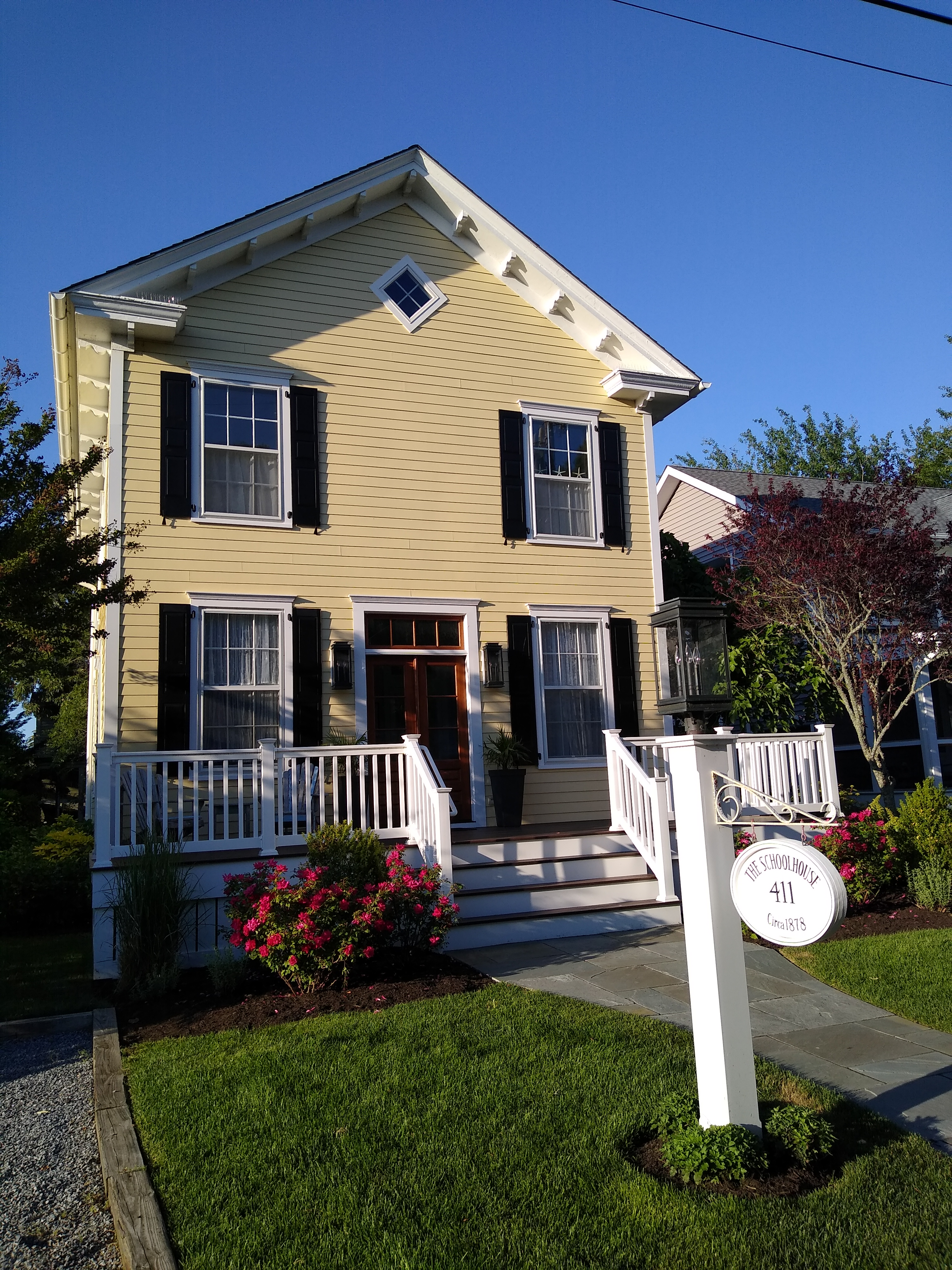
The Schoolhouse, a house, was formerly the Cape May Point school

Cape May Point School District is a non-operating school district based in Cape May Point, New Jersey. All students are sent to schools outside of the district. Cape May Point became a borough in 1878 and then again in 1908, and there was a 1-8 school in Cape May Point from the 1870s until 1931.

== History ==
A two-story grade 1-8 school opened in the 1870s, with the lower and upper four grades each having the lower and upper floors. The area media did not cover the opening of the school, which would not have been in existence when Sea Grove (as Cape May Point was first known) was first established but which did exist in 1878. George Eldredge, who previously taught in Cape May City, was the first known teacher and principal, and at the time he was the sole school employee. According to subsequent newspaper reports, almost each year there was a different teacher, meaning that Eldredge, according to Joe Jordan, author of Cape May Point, The Illustrated History-1875 to the Present, likely left shortly after his term began. Jordan wrote that due to the lack of year-round residents and therefore few pupils, "It's doubtful that overcrowding was ever a problem." Cape May Point became a borough in 1878, and while it became a part of Lower Township in 1896, it again became its own municipality in 1908. Burton J. Smith became principal in 1922. The district began sending students to Lower Township School District in 1931 and closed the former school. It served as a duplex apartment building, and then was converted into a single family house. Jordan stated that the house owner preserved as many of the historical details as they could.

Cape May Point under Frank Rutherford, the mayor, chose not to join the Lower Cape May Regional School District when it was formed; in the 1960s several children living there attended Roman Catholic schools. Former town clerk Irene Schreiner stated "Frank Rutherford always said it was the best thing we ever did. We could send the kids wherever we want and pay per student."

In 2007 Lucille E. Davy, the New Jersey Commissioner of Education, stated that the CMP school board will remain in operation instead of the school board being dissolved. Taxation in CMP would have changed if the CMP school board was dissolved. While the New Jersey government forcibly merged non-operating districts which sent students to one school district each in 2010, Cape May Point was not affected despite the government intending to merge non-operating districts which each sent students to multiple districts.

== Sending ==
For pre-kindergarten through sixth grade, public school students attend Cape May City Elementary School in Cape May City, as part of a sending/receiving relationship with the Cape May City School District. Most students in the Cape May elementary district come from the United States Coast Guard Training Center Cape May. For seventh through twelfth grades, public school students attend the schools of the Lower Cape May Regional School District, which serves students from Cape May City, Cape May Point, Lower Township and West Cape May.

== Operations ==
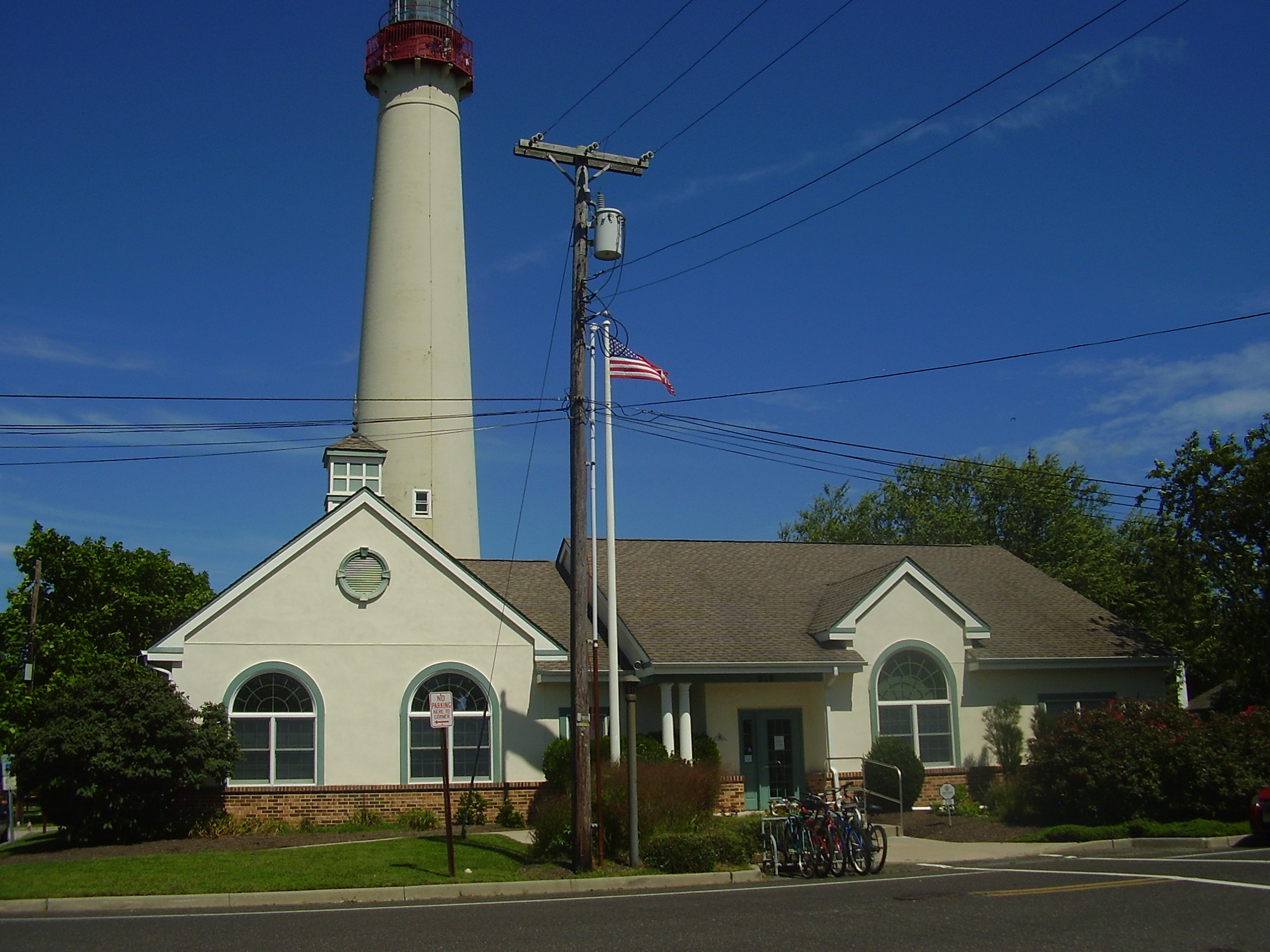
Board meetings are held at borough hall

Members of the Cape May Point Board of Education are permitted to attend board meetings at the school districts that receive Cape May Point students, but the Cape May Point board members cannot vote on any matters in the receiving districts. Cape May Point delegates matters of curriculum and the operations of the schools which receive Cape May Point students to the receiving districts. As of 2014 the school taxation rate is $0.01 or below, specifically $0.0075 per $100 of assessed property value. In 2004, because of the low school taxation, Cape May Point had among the lowest property tax rates in New Jersey.

Operating expenses depend on the number of students sent each year. Excess funds are stored for later usage. The district pays an administrator.

The school board holds its meetings at Cape May Point Borough Hall.

== Sending students ==
Circa the 2010s the number of Cape May Point students going to receiving schools was between no students to five students. In 2012 there were four students. Since all of them moved away, in 2013 there were no students being sent at all. In 2014 it had no students going to the LCMR district. In the 2019–2020 school year there were three students in Cape May Point attending the receiving public schools.

== See also ==
- List of school districts in New Jersey

Sending school districts (equivalent of a New Jersey non-operating school district) in Arizona:

- Chevelon Butte School District
- Walnut Grove Elementary School District
- Congress Elementary School District (was a sending district prior to 2001)
