= Potato Patch, Arizona =

Human settlement in Yapavai County, Arizona, US

Potato Patch
- Unincorporated community
- Location in the state of Arizona
- Coordinates: 34°25′48″N 112°24′51″W
- Country: United States
- State: Arizona
- County: Yavapai
- Elevation: 6,861 ft (2,091 m)
- Time zone: UTC−7 (MST (no DST))
- Area code: 928
- GNIS feature ID: 33142

Potato Patch is a populated place in Yavapai County, Arizona, United States.

== Education ==
It is in the Prescott Unified School District, which operates Prescott High School.
