= Brian Stauffer =

American artist, and illustrator (born 1966)

- Born: June 20, 1966 (age 59); Prescott, Arizona, US
- Education: Yavapai College; The University of Arizona (BFA)
- Known for: illustration

Brian Stauffer (born May 20, 1966 in Prescott, Arizona) is an American artist and illustrator. Stauffer begins works with hand-drawn sketches, then incorporates painted elements and scanned found objects. The final works are digital, but often the hand-drawn elements remain as part of the finished works.

== Early life and education ==
Stauffer was born in Prescott, Arizona, and attended Prescott High School. His father was a fine artist.

Stauffer attended Yavapai College as a music major. During his second year, Stauffer began working in graphic arts, working with Yavapai instructor and color theorist Glen Peterson. Stauffer later attended The University of Arizona, where he received a BFA in 1989.

Before taking on illustration as a full-time career, Stauffer worked as an art director at New Times in Phoenix, The Miami New Times, and for Starmedia. While working at The Miami New Times, Stauffer sent a few of his illustration samples to Fred Woodward at Rolling Stone magazine who, with Gail Anderson, gave him his first freelance assignment for a movie review.

=== Influences ===
Stauffer cites the works of John Heartfield and Alexander Calder as major influences.

== Work ==
Stauffer gained recognition early in his illustration career for his November 13, 2000, cover for The Nation, titled Alfred E. Bush, which depicted President George W. Bush as Alfred E. Neuman, the fictitious mascot and cover boy of Mad Magazine. In 2005, the cover was selected by the American Society of Magazine Editors as number 23 of the top 40 magazine covers in the last 40 years.

Stauffer was featured as a cover illustrator for magazines such as The New Yorker, The Nation, and Worth Magazine. In 2010, the Society of Publication Designers recognized the work of design director Dean Sebring and Stauffer for their Worth Magazine covers.

Stauffer was recognized for his contributions to smaller publications, including his work for SF Weekly, and cover illustrations for the Dallas Observer, and Seattle Weekly, among others.

=== Book illustrations ===
- Art by Karen Salmonsohn, Random House (2003)
- Fashion by Karen Salmonsohn, Random House (2003)

=== Notable poster work ===
- Savannah Music Festival (2013)
- Death of a Salesman, Soulpepper Theatre Company (2010)
- What The Butler Saw Soulpepper Theatre Company (2010)
- The Barber of Seville Vancouver Opera, Queen Elizabeth Theatre (2012)

== Awards ==
- Silver Medal (Institutional), 2015, Society of Illustrators, Ambition for the Kroll Foundation, art directed b Kit Hinrichs
- Silver Medal (Institutional), 2012, Society of Illustrators, Digital Evidence And The Smoking Gun for Emory Law, art directed by Winnie Hume
- Gold Medal (Editorial), 2010, Society of Illustrators, Infighting Police for Village Voice Media, art directed by Peter Storch
- Gold Medal for editorial illustration, Society of Illustrators, 2010
- Gold Print Editorial Award, International Design Awards IDA, Winner with Andrew J. Nilsen, Worlds Apart (2012)
- Gold Medal (with Dean Sebring, Worth Magazine) Society of Publication Designers (2010)
- Silver Medals (2) Worth Magazine covers, The Art Directors Club (2012)
- First place illustration Good Cop Bad Cop for Phoenix New Times, AltWeekly Awards (2010)
- First place illustration 7-Up vs. Coke, Part 2 for Riverfront Times, AltWeekly Awards (2009)
- First place illustration The Suitcase Murders for Miami New Times, AltWeekly Awards (2008)
