= Groom Creek, Arizona =

Community in Yavapai County, Arizona, US

Coordinates: 34°28′32″N 112°25′53″W

Groom Creek is an unincorporated community in Yavapai County, in the U.S. state of Arizona.

== History ==
A post office called Groom Creek was in operation between 1901 and 1942. The community was named for Robert W. Groom, a prospector.

== Education ==
It is in the Prescott Unified School District, which operates Prescott High School.

== Summer Camps ==
The thickly forested, high-elevation terrain of Groom Creek is cooler in the summer than most places in Arizona, with a maximum high temperature averaging 85 degrees Fahrenheit (29 degrees Celsius) in July. Because of this, there have been children's summer camps located in the area for many decades. As of 2025 these include:

- Camp Maripai (Girl Scouts, Arizona Cactus-Pine Council)
- Camp Wamatochick (Teen Round-up Ministries)
- Camp Sky-Y (Valley of the Sun YMCA)
- Friendly Pines Camp (Private)
- Kamp Kipa (Phoenix Laestadian Lutheran Church)
- Pine Summit Bible Camp (Non-profit/non-denominational Christian)
- Whispering Pines Camp (Community of Christ)
