= David Yetman =

American academic

David Albert Yetman (born 1941) is an American academic expert on the State of Sonora in northwestern Mexico, and an Emmy Award-winning television presenter on the world's deserts. He is a research social scientist at the University of Arizona.

== Background ==
Yetman was born in New Jersey. His father was a minister for the Methodist Church. Following the onset of acute asthma, his family moved with him to the dry climate of southern Arizona when he was a teenager. They arrived in Duncan, Arizona, in 1954 and then moved to Prescott in 1955, where Yetman went to Prescott High School.

Remaining in southern Arizona, he began trading carvings in the 1970s made by the Seri Indians of Sonora, Mexico and began to investigate their livelihoods and culture (Yetman 1988). He also worked in the Chiricahua Mountains. He completed a PhD in philosophy (University of Arizona, 1972). In 1977 he ran for political office and was elected to the Pima County Board of Supervisors as a Democrat, serving until 1988. He used this role to preserve public lands in and around Tucson. He then worked as Executive Director of the Tucson Audubon Society, and then from 1992, joined the University of Arizona’s Southwest Center as Research Social Scientist.

Yetman's TV career as host of The Desert Speaks began in 2000, a series lasting 9 years. His Emmy Award-winning PBS series In the Americas with David Yetman began in 2011 and deals with quirky and interesting corners of the Western Hemisphere. As of 2024, ten seasons of ten episodes each have aired and a season 11 is being promoted.

Yetman lives in Tucson.

== Contributions ==
Yetman is a 'voice' for desert regions and their peoples. Like colleagues at the University of Arizona, Gary Nabhan, Tom Sheridan and Joe Wilder, his focus is on the desert regions of south-west USA and Northern Mexico. He specializes in the plants, geography and the lifeways and cultures of the region's indigenous peoples, particularly in northwestern Mexico. By 2010 he estimated he had crossed the US-Mexican border 500 times. His publications date back to the 1980s and often deal with the plant use of particular tribes and peoples.

== Books ==
- Yetman, D.A. 1988. Where the desert meets the sea: a trader in the land of the Seri Indians.. Tucson: Pepper Press.
- Yetman, D.A. 1988. Scattered round stones: a Mayo village in Sonora, Mexico. Albuquerque: University of New Mexico Press
- Martin P.S., D.A. Yetman, M. Fishbein, P. Jenkins, T.R. van Devender, R.K. Wilson. 1998. Gentry's Río Mayo plants: the tropical deciduous forest & environs of northwest Mexico.
- Yetman, D.A. 1996. Sonora: an intimate geography. Albuquerque: University of New Mexico Press.
- Yetman, D.A. and TR. van Devender. 2002. Mayo ethnobotany: land history, and traditional knowledge in Northwest Mexico.. University of California Press.
- Yetman, D.A. 2002. Hidden People: The Guarijíos of Northwest Mexico and their ethnobotany.. Albuquerque: University of New Mexico Press.
- Yetman, D.A. 2006. The organ pipe cactus. Tucson: University of Arizona Press.
- Yetman, D.A. 2007. The Great Cacti: ethnobotany and biogeography. Tucson: University of Arizona Press.
- Yetman, D.A. 2009. 50 Common edible and useful plants of the Southwest. Tucson: Western National Parks Association.
- Yetman, D.A. and DL Shaul. 2010. The Ópatas: in search of a Sonoran people. Tucson: University of Arizona Press.
- Yetman, D.A. 2012. Conflict in colonial Sonora : Indians, priests, and settlers. Albuquerque: University of New Mexico Press.
- Yetman, D.A. 2020. "The Saguaro Cactus : A Natural History". Tucson : University of Arizona Press.
- Yetman, D.A. 2021. "Natural Landmarks of Arizona". Tucson : University of Arizona Press.

== Media ==
- Host of the APT KUAT TV series, The Desert Speaks 2000-2009.
- Host of In the Americas PBS TV series (2011-), eight seasons of 10 episodes each here

== Awards ==
- Emmy Award in 2007 for documentary television work, The Desert Speaks
- Emmy Award in 2014 for PBS documentary television work, In the Americas with David Yetman.
- The David Yetman Award for Exhibiting or Promoting Conservation in Southern Arizona is awarded yearly by the Tucson Audubon Society.
- There is a 5.4 miles (8.7 km) long David Yetman Trail in the mountains west of Tucson, named in honour of his conservation efforts.
