= Williamson, Arizona =

CDP in Yavapai County, Arizona

- CDP
- Location in Yavapai County and the state of Arizona

- Location in the United States
- Coordinates: 34°40′28″N 112°31′50″W
- Country: United States
- State: Arizona
- County: Yavapai

Area
  - Total: 58.15 sq mi (150.60 km^{2})
  - Land: 58.15 sq mi (150.60 km^{2})
  - Water: 0 sq mi (0.00 km^{2})
- Elevation: 5,053 ft (1,540 m)

Population (2020)
  - Total: 6,196
  - Density: 106.6/sq mi (41.14/km^{2})
- Time zone: UTC-7 (MST)
- FIPS code: 04-83388
- GNIS feature ID: 2409597

Williamson is a census-designated place (CDP) in Yavapai County, Arizona, United States. The population was 3,776 at the 2000 census and 6,196 at the 2020 census. The name "Wiliamson" is a misnomer, perhaps propagated by federal bureaucratic error; the area has long been known as "Williamson Valley" after the major road through the area, Williamson Valley Road.

== Geography ==
According to the United States Census Bureau, the CDP has a total area of 57.6 square miles (149 km^{2}), all land.

An attempt in 2009 to incorporate the area into a town failed after the neighboring town of Prescott voted against the proposal.

Part or all of the area of Williamson historically was referred to as Williamson Valley by area residents and by the county's Board of Supervisors, County Planning Commission, and staff. alike. In a County plan, however, "only the northern portion of the plan area is 'Williamson Valley.' The southern portion was long ago called Mint Valley".

== Demographics ==
Historical population
Census	Pop.	Note	%±
2020	6,196		—
U.S. Decennial Census

=== 2020 census ===
As of the 2020 census, Williamson had a population of 6,196. The median age was 64.5 years. 10.7% of residents were under the age of 18 and 48.6% of residents were 65 years of age or older. For every 100 females there were 94.2 males, and for every 100 females age 18 and over there were 95.2 males age 18 and over.

7.4% of residents lived in urban areas, while 92.6% lived in rural areas.

There were 2,787 households in Williamson, of which 13.0% had children under the age of 18 living in them. Of all households, 69.2% were married-couple households, 11.7% were households with a male householder and no spouse or partner present, and 13.9% were households with a female householder and no spouse or partner present. About 18.1% of all households were made up of individuals and 12.5% had someone living alone who was 65 years of age or older.

There were 3,189 housing units, of which 12.6% were vacant. The homeowner vacancy rate was 2.5% and the rental vacancy rate was 10.5%.

Racial composition as of the 2020 census
Race	Number	Percent
White	5,632	90.9%
Black or African American	21	0.3%
American Indian and Alaska Native	29	0.5%
Asian	42	0.7%
Native Hawaiian and Other Pacific Islander	5	0.1%
Some other race	104	1.7%
Two or more races	363	5.9%
Hispanic or Latino (of any race)	351	5.7%

=== 2000 census ===
At the 2000 census there were 3,776 people, 1,558 households, and 1,266 families in the CDP. The population density was 65.5 inhabitants per square mile (25.3/km^{2}). There were 1,718 housing units at an average density of 29.8 per square mile (11.5/km^{2}). The racial makeup of the CDP was 96.9% White, 0.1% Black or African American, 0.4% Native American, 0.3% Asian, 0.1% Pacific Islander, 0.8% from other races, and 1.4% from two or more races. 3.5% of the population were Hispanic or Latino of any race. Of the 1,558 households 20.9% had children under the age of 18 living with them, 74.8% were married couples living together, 4.4% had a female householder with no husband present, and 18.7% were non-families. 14.2% of households were one person and 5.1% were one person aged 65 or older. The average household size was 2.42 and the average family size was 2.65.

The age distribution was 17.7% under the age of 18, 3.8% from 18 to 24, 17.1% from 25 to 44, 41.3% from 45 to 64, and 20.1% 65 or older. The median age was 51 years. For every 100 females, there were 96.8 males. For every 100 females age 18 and over, there were 95.8 males.

The median household income was $47,182 and the median family income was $51,983. Males had a median income of $40,189 versus $26,500 for females. The per capita income for the CDP was $30,232. About 3.6% of families and 5.3% of the population were below the poverty line, including 7.1% of those under age 18 and 1.5% of those age 65 or over.

== Education ==
Much of Williamson is in Prescott Unified School District. Portions are in Chino Valley Unified School District and Williamson Valley Elementary School District. The Prescott district operates Prescott High School.
