= Lake Montezuma, Arizona =

CDP in Yavapai County, Arizona

- CDP
- The Rimrock Ranch airplane, around 1930. Rimrock Ranch was a dude ranch near Montezuma Well.

- Location in Yavapai County and the state of Arizona

- Location in the United States
- Coordinates: 34°37′55″N 111°47′43″W
- Country: United States
- State: Arizona
- County: Yavapai

Area
  - Total: 11.54 sq mi (29.89 km^{2})
  - Land: 11.53 sq mi (29.86 km^{2})
  - Water: 0.012 sq mi (0.03 km^{2})
- Elevation: 3,445 ft (1,050 m)

Population (2020)
  - Total: 5,111
  - Density: 443.3/sq mi (171.15/km^{2})
- Time zone: UTC-7 (MST)
- ZIP code: 86342
- Area code: 928
- FIPS code: 04-39720
- GNIS feature ID: 2408544

Lake Montezuma is a census-designated place (CDP) in Yavapai County in the U.S. state of Arizona. The population was 5,111 at the 2020 census. The CDP includes the communities of Rimrock and McGuireville. Located along Interstate 17, it is 20 miles (32 km) south of Sedona and 8 miles (13 km) north of Camp Verde in central Arizona's Verde Valley.

== History ==
The community was originally known as Beaver Creek as ranchers and farmers settled along the banks of the creek named for the prolific numbers of beavers found there.

Wales Arnold, the first settler along Beaver Creek, came to Beaver Creek in 1870 and lived at what became known as The Montezuma Well Ranch. Arnold, who came to Arizona as a member of the California Column during the Civil War ultimately became the sutler or civilian merchant of the firm Arnold and Bowers at Camp Lincoln following his discharge from the Army at Fort Whipple August 29, 1864. His partner in this enterprise was George Bowers who was killed by Indians near the head of Copper Canyon while en route to Prescott alongside a young soldier named Robert Nix. Arnold held several hay contracts with the Army at Camp Lincoln (renamed Fort Verde in 1868) and grew the first alfalfa known to be grown in the Verde Valley. The Montezuma Well Ranch served as a way station where mail riders changed horses when the mail began to be carried from Fort Whipple to Fort Wingate.

By 1879 there were several children along Beaver Creek and what became Beaver Creek School started when Ed Mulholland began teaching school there then.

The part of the community known as McGuireville began in 1910 when Eugene McGuire settled near the confluence of Dry Beaver Creek and Wet Beaver Creek. This was also at the junction of the historic road from Stoneman Lake which split there with one route going on to Cornville, Cottonwood and Jerome and the other going south to Camp Verde and on to Prescott via Copper Canyon or Cherry. Eugene McGuire along with his son Gene homesteaded there beginning in 1910. Their small store and gas station was supplanted by another store operated by Midge Montgomery who started Beaver Creek Store there in 1931.

The area generally became known as Rimrock in 1928 when Virginia Finnie, the daughter of a prominent local rancher, married Romaine Lowdermilk and the couple along with partner Russell Boardman started a dude ranch originally called Rimrock Lodge later known as Rimrock Dude Ranch. It was so named for the prominent limestone rimrocks forming the edges of the mesas visible from the hill top ranch. Her prominent guests were wanting efficient communications with the outside world so Virginia saw the need to establish a post office on the ranch. Virginia's Mother-in-law, Ella Loudermilk, became the first post mistress of the newly established Rimrock Post Office chartered July 11, 1928. People from the Coconino County line near Stoneman Lake, Apache Maid Ranch etc. and up and down the creek nearly to Camp Verde, picked up their mail at the Rimrock Post Office. The former area of Beaver Creek School district thus generally became known as Rimrock. One of Arizona's oldest continuously operated landing strips - The Rimrock Airport - is located here as dudes used to fly into the ranch in days gone by.

Around 1957 shortly after the Black Canyon Highway was built north from Phoenix, one of the largest ranches in Rimrock was turned into a subdivision called Lake Montezuma. The developers were planning on selling much of the property to out-of-state buyers and realized they needed something attractive in the name. They dug out a pond below the original ranch house and named it Lake Montezuma after the area's most significant local landmark - Montezuma Well National Monument.

In the area of the nearby Lawrence Crossing of the Wet Beaver Creek there are artifacts of the ancient Sinagua people, including water catchments for irrigation canals.

== Geography ==
According to the United States Census Bureau, the CDP has a total area of 12.0 square miles (31 km^{2}), of which 11.9 square miles (31 km^{2}) is land and 0.08% is water.

=== Climate ===
The Köppen Climate Classification subtype for this climate is BSk (cool semi-arid climate).

Climate data for Lake Montezuma, Arizona
Month	Jan	Feb	Mar	Apr	May	Jun	Jul	Aug	Sep	Oct	Nov	Dec	Year
Mean daily maximum °C (°F)	14 (57)	17 (62)	19 (66)	24 (75)	28 (83)	34 (94)	36 (97)	34 (94)	31 (88)	26 (78)	19 (66)	14 (57)	24 (76)
Mean daily minimum °C (°F)	−1 (30)	1 (33)	3 (37)	7 (44)	11 (52)	16 (61)	19 (67)	18 (65)	14 (58)	8 (47)	2 (35)	−1 (30)	8 (47)
Average precipitation mm (inches)	36 (1.4)	38 (1.5)	43 (1.7)	23 (0.9)	13 (0.5)	5.1 (0.2)	38 (1.5)	53 (2.1)	46 (1.8)	33 (1.3)	33 (1.3)	38 (1.5)	400 (15.6)
Source: Weatherbase

== Demographics ==
Historical population
Census	Pop.	Note	%±
2020	5,111		—
U.S. Decennial Census

=== 2020 census ===
As of the 2020 census, Lake Montezuma had a population of 5,111. The median age was 49.2 years. 19.9% of residents were under the age of 18 and 26.4% of residents were 65 years of age or older. For every 100 females there were 94.9 males, and for every 100 females age 18 and over there were 93.0 males age 18 and over.

0.0% of residents lived in urban areas, while 100.0% lived in rural areas.

There were 2,157 households in Lake Montezuma, of which 21.5% had children under the age of 18 living in them. Of all households, 45.6% were married-couple households, 19.8% were households with a male householder and no spouse or partner present, and 26.6% were households with a female householder and no spouse or partner present. About 30.8% of all households were made up of individuals and 15.6% had someone living alone who was 65 years of age or older.

There were 2,422 housing units, of which 10.9% were vacant. The homeowner vacancy rate was 1.9% and the rental vacancy rate was 4.3%.

Racial composition as of the 2020 census
Race	Number	Percent
White	3,919	76.7%
Black or African American	18	0.4%
American Indian and Alaska Native	197	3.9%
Asian	41	0.8%
Native Hawaiian and Other Pacific Islander	5	0.1%
Some other race	299	5.9%
Two or more races	632	12.4%
Hispanic or Latino (of any race)	887	17.4%

=== 2000 census ===
As of the 2000 census, there were 3,344 people, 1,471 households, and 938 families residing in the CDP. The population density was 279.7 inhabitants per square mile (108.0/km^{2}). There were 1,666 housing units at an average density of 139.4 per square mile (53.8/km^{2}). The racial makeup of the CDP was 92.6% White, 0.1% Black or African American, 2.3% Native American, 0.2% Asian, 2.8% from other races, and 2.0% from two or more races. 7.3% of the population were Hispanic or Latino of any race.

There were 1,471 households, out of which 20.6% had children under the age of 18 living with them, 51.7% were married couples living together, 8.5% had a female householder with no husband present, and 36.2% were non-families. 28.0% of all households were made up of individuals, and 11.9% had someone living alone who was 65 years of age or older. The average household size was 2.27 and the average family size was 2.73.

In the CDP, the population was spread out, with 19.6% under the age of 18, 6.4% from 18 to 24, 24.5% from 25 to 44, 28.5% from 45 to 64, and 21.1% who were 65 years of age or older. The median age was 45 years. For every 100 females, there were 92.7 males. For every 100 females age 18 and over, there were 92.1 males.

The median income for a household in the CDP was $33,750, and the median income for a family was $36,864. Males had a median income of $22,365 versus $21,538 for females. The per capita income for the CDP was $17,043. About 7.2% of families and 9.1% of the population were below the poverty line, including 12.4% of those under age 18 and 1.4% of those age 65 or over.

== Education ==
It is in the Beaver Creek School District.

== Notable person ==
- Eulalia "Sister" Bourne, pioneer Arizona schoolteacher and author

== See also ==
- Coconino National Forest
- Wet Beaver Wilderness
- Montezuma Well
