= Bradshaw Mountain High School =

Location
- 6000 Long Look Dr. Prescott Valley, Arizona; United States; 34°35′55″N 112°20′47″W

Information
- Type: Public high school
- Established: 1976 (50 years ago)
- Superintendent: John Pothast
- CEEB code: 030071
- Principal: Brett Dahl
- Staff: 71.25 (FTE)
- Grades: 9–12
- Enrollment: 1,616 (2024–2025)
- Student to teacher ratio: 22.68
- Campus type: Rural/suburban
- Colors: Black, red, and white
- Mascot: Bears
- Accreditation: North Central Association
- Website: hs.humboldtunified.com

Bradshaw Mountain High School is a grade 9–12 school located in Prescott Valley, Arizona operated by the Humboldt Unified School District.

Humboldt USD includes most of Prescott Valley, all of Dewey Humboldt, and small portions of Chino Valley and Mayer.

== Notable alumni ==
- Dusty Brown, former MLB player (Boston Red Sox, Pittsburgh Pirates)
- Ben Diggins, former MLB player (Milwaukee Brewers)
