= Chevelon Butte School District =

School district in Arizona, United States

Address
- 3031 Old Rim Rd. Forest Lakes, Arizona, 85931; United States

District information
- Type: Public
- NCES District ID: 0401920

Other information
- Website: www.chevelonbutte.org

Chevelon Butte School District 5, also known as Chevelon Butte Elementary School District (CBESD), is a school district in Coconino County, Arizona.

The district boundary includes Forest Lakes and most of Blue Ridge.

The district does not operate any schools. It contracts with other school districts to take students within its borders. Heber-Overgaard Unified School District takes students from the Forest Lakes area. Pine Strawberry School District takes elementary level students from the CBESD Blue Ridge area, while Payson Unified School District takes secondary school students from the CBESD Blue Ridge area. The district previously sent its Blue Ridge area students to Winslow Unified School District, including Winslow High School.

== See also ==
Sending school districts in Arizona:

- Walnut Grove Elementary School District (closed in 2021)
- Congress Elementary School District (was a sending district prior to 2001)

Non-operating school districts (school districts which do not operate any schools) in New Jersey:

- Cape May Point School District
- Sea Isle City School District
