= Yavapai County, Arizona =

County in Arizona, United States

- County
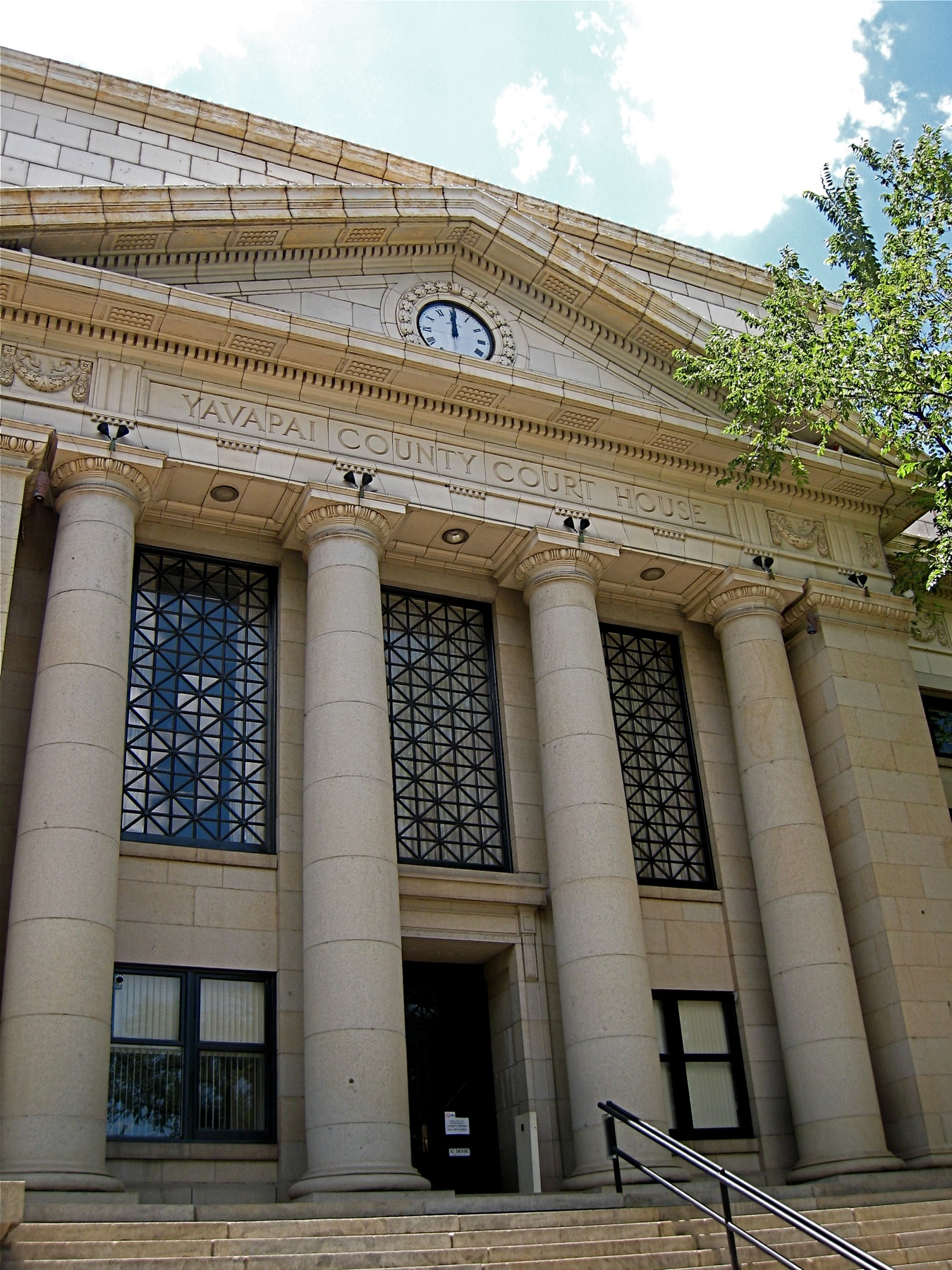
- Yavapai County Courthouse in Prescott

- Flag Seal Logo

- Location within the U.S. state of Arizona
- Coordinates: 34°33′41″N 112°32′24″W
- Country: United States
- State: Arizona
- Founded: November 9, 1864
- Named for: Yavapai people
- Seat: Prescott
- Largest city: Prescott Valley

Area
  - Total: 8,128 sq mi (21,050 km^{2})
  - Land: 8,123 sq mi (21,040 km^{2})
  - Water: 4.4 sq mi (11 km^{2}) 0.05%

Population (2020)
  - Total: 236,209
  - Estimate (2025): 252,552 ▲
  - Density: 29.08/sq mi (11.23/km^{2})
- Time zone: UTC−7 (Mountain)
- Congressional district: 2nd
- Website: yavapaiaz.gov

Yavapai County (/ˈjævəˌpaɪ/ YA-və-py) is a county near the center of the U.S. state of Arizona. As of the 2020 census, its population was 236,209, making it the fourth-most populous county in Arizona. The county seat is Prescott.

Yavapai County comprises the Prescott Valley-Prescott, AZ Metropolitan Statistical Area as well as the northern portions of Peoria and Wickenburg, the balance of which are in the Phoenix Metropolitan Area.

== History ==
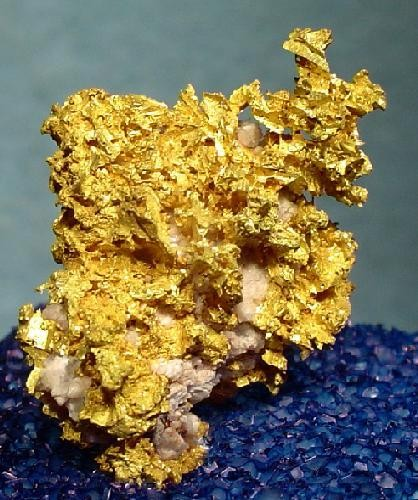
Old gold specimen from an unknown Yavapai County mine. Size: 2.0 cm × 1.8 cm × 1.7 cm (0.8 in × 0.7 in × 0.7 in).

Yavapai County was one of the four original Arizona counties created by the 1st Arizona Territorial Legislature. The county territory was defined as being east of longitude 113° 20' and north of the Gila River. Soon thereafter, the counties of Apache, Coconino, Maricopa, and Navajo were carved from the original Yavapai County. Yavapai County's present boundaries were established in 1891.

The county is named after the Yavapai people, who were the principal inhabitants at the time the United States annexed the area.

County level law enforcement services have been provided by Yavapai County Sheriff's Office since 1864.

== Geography ==
According to the United States Census Bureau, the county has a total area of 8,128 square miles (21,050 km^{2}), of which 8,123 square miles (21,040 km^{2}) is land and 4.4 square miles (11 km^{2}) (0.05%) is water. It has about 93% of the area of the U.S. state of New Jersey. It is larger than three U.S. states (Rhode Island, Delaware and Connecticut) and the District of Columbia combined.

The county's topography makes a dramatic transition from the lower Sonoran Desert to the south to the heights of the Coconino Plateau to the north, and the Mogollon Rim to the east. The highest point above sea level (MSL) in Yavapai County is Mount Union at an elevation of 7,979 ft (2,432 m) and the lowest is Agua Fria River drainage, now under Lake Pleasant.

=== Adjacent counties ===
- Mohave County – west
- La Paz County – southwest
- Maricopa County – south
- Gila County – south/southeast
- Coconino County – north/northeast

=== Major highways ===
- Interstate 11 (Future)
- Interstate 17
- Interstate 40
- U.S. Route 93
- State Route 66
- State Route 69
- State Route 71
- State Route 89
  - State Route 89A
- State Route 96
- State Route 97
- State Route 169
- State Route 179
- State Route 260
- State Route 279

=== National protected areas ===
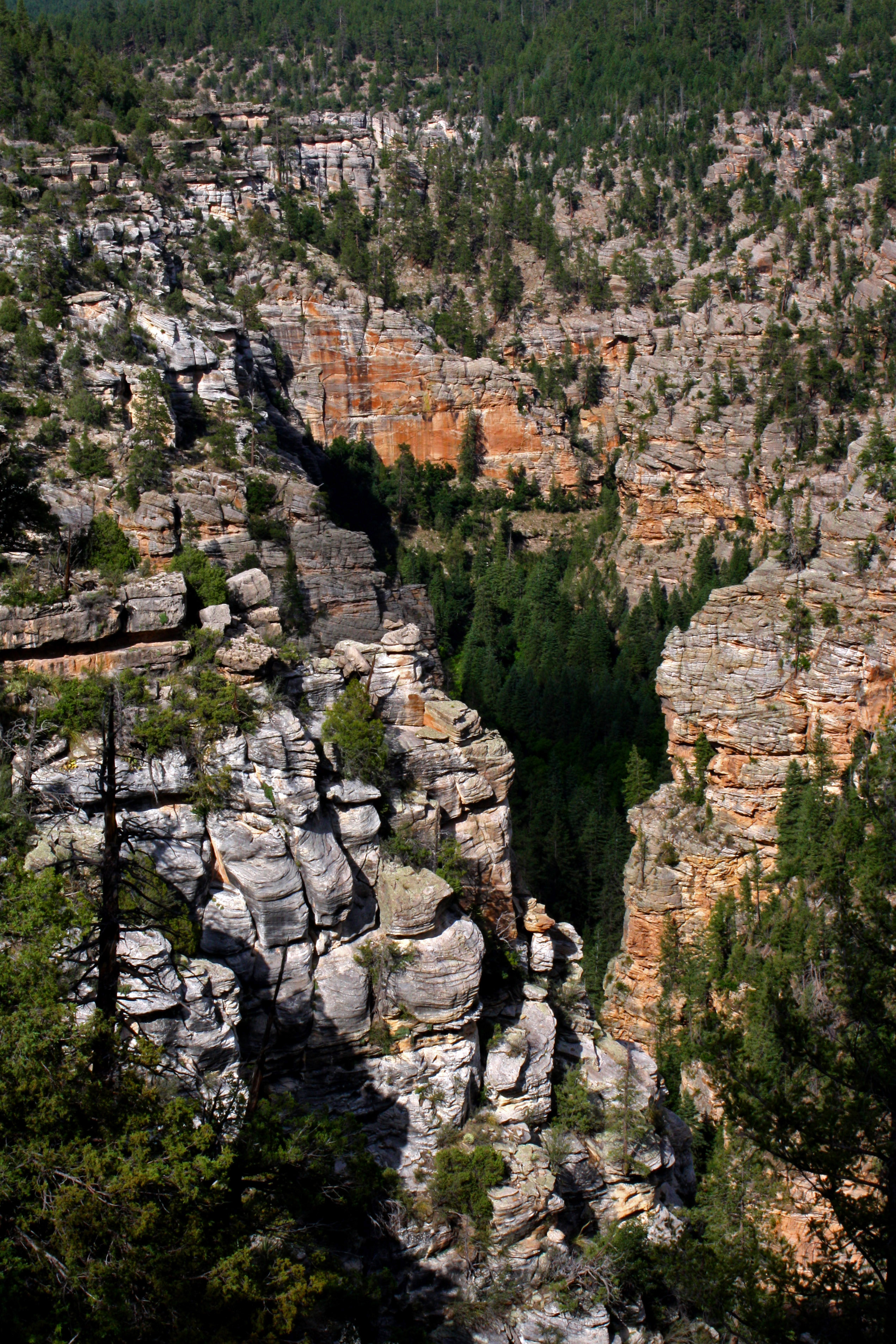
West Clear Creek Wilderness

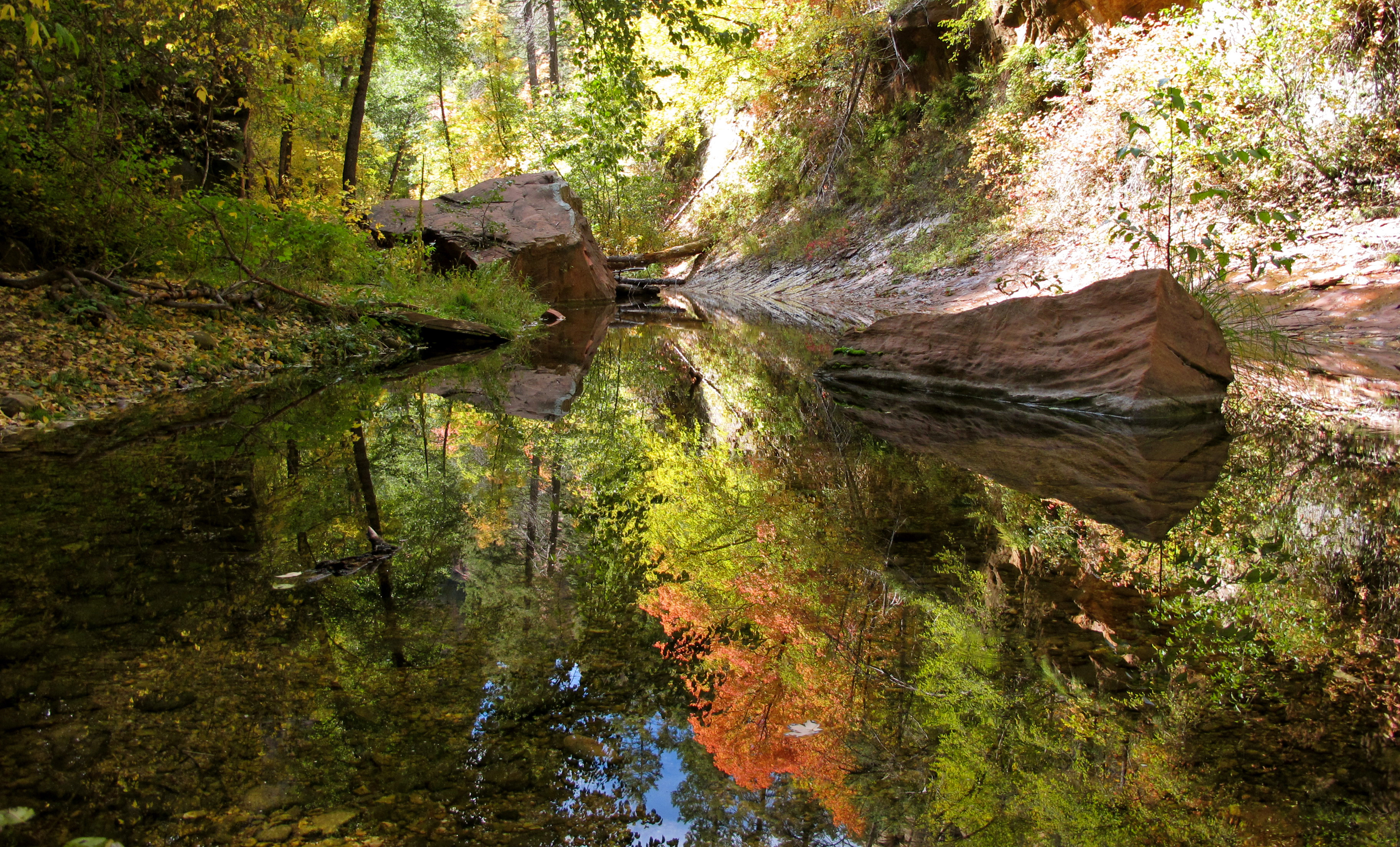
West Fork of Oak Creek, in the Red Rock-Secret Mountain Wilderness

- Agua Fria National Monument
- Coconino National Forest (part)
- Kaibab National Forest (part)
- Montezuma Castle National Monument
- Prescott National Forest (part)
- Tonto National Forest (part)
- Tuzigoot National Monument

There are nineteen official wilderness areas in Yavapai County that are part of the National Wilderness Preservation System. Fourteen of these are integral parts of National Forests listed above, whereas five are managed by the Bureau of Land Management. Some of these extend into neighboring counties (as indicated below):

- Apache Creek Wilderness (Prescott NF)
- Arrastra Mountain Wilderness (BLM) mostly in Mohave County; also partly in La Paz County
- Castle Creek Wilderness (Prescott NF)
- Cedar Bench Wilderness (Prescott NF)
- Fossil Springs Wilderness (Coconino NF) mostly in Coconino County
- Granite Mountain Wilderness (Arizona) (Prescott NF)
- Hassayampa River Canyon Wilderness (BLM)
- Hells Canyon Wilderness (Arizona) (BLM) partly in Maricopa County
- Juniper Mesa Wilderness (Prescott NF)
- Mazatzal Wilderness (Tonto NF / Coconino NF) partly in Gila County; Maricopa County
- Munds Mountain Wilderness (Coconino NF) mostly in Coconino County
- Pine Mountain Wilderness (Tonto NF/Prescott NF)
- Red Rock-Secret Mountain Wilderness (Coconino NF) partly in Coconino County
- Sycamore Canyon Wilderness (Prescott NF/Coconino NF / Kaibab NF) mostly in Coconino County
- Tres Alamos Wilderness (BLM)
- Upper Burro Creek Wilderness (BLM) partly in Mohave County
- West Clear Creek Wilderness (Coconino NF) partly in Coconino County
- Wet Beaver Wilderness (Coconino NF) partly in Coconino County
- Woodchute Wilderness (Prescott NF)

=== Land ownership and management ===
- Private ownership: about 25% of Yavapai County's land (by area) is privately owned.
- Public land: about 75% of the county's area is publicly owned, including

- Federal ownership: about 50% of the county's area is owned by the federal government of the United States, including

- National Forest lands, managed by the US Forest Service: 38% of the county's area
- Federal lands managed by the U.S. Bureau of Land Management: 11.6% of the county's area
- Small areas of federal land are managed by the U.S. Bureau of Indian Affairs and the National Park Service: less than 0.5% of the county's area.

Yavapai-Prescott Tribe 1,413 acres (572 ha)
Yavapai-Apache Nation 685 acres (277 ha)

- About 25% of Yavapai County is owned by the State of Arizona as state trust lands, managed by the Arizona State Land Department.

=== Flora and fauna ===
There are numerous flora and fauna species within Yavapai County. For example, a number of plants within the genus Ephedra and Coreopsis are found in the county. Yavapai County is also the location of several groves of the near-threatened California Fan Palm, Washingtonia filifera.

== Attractions ==
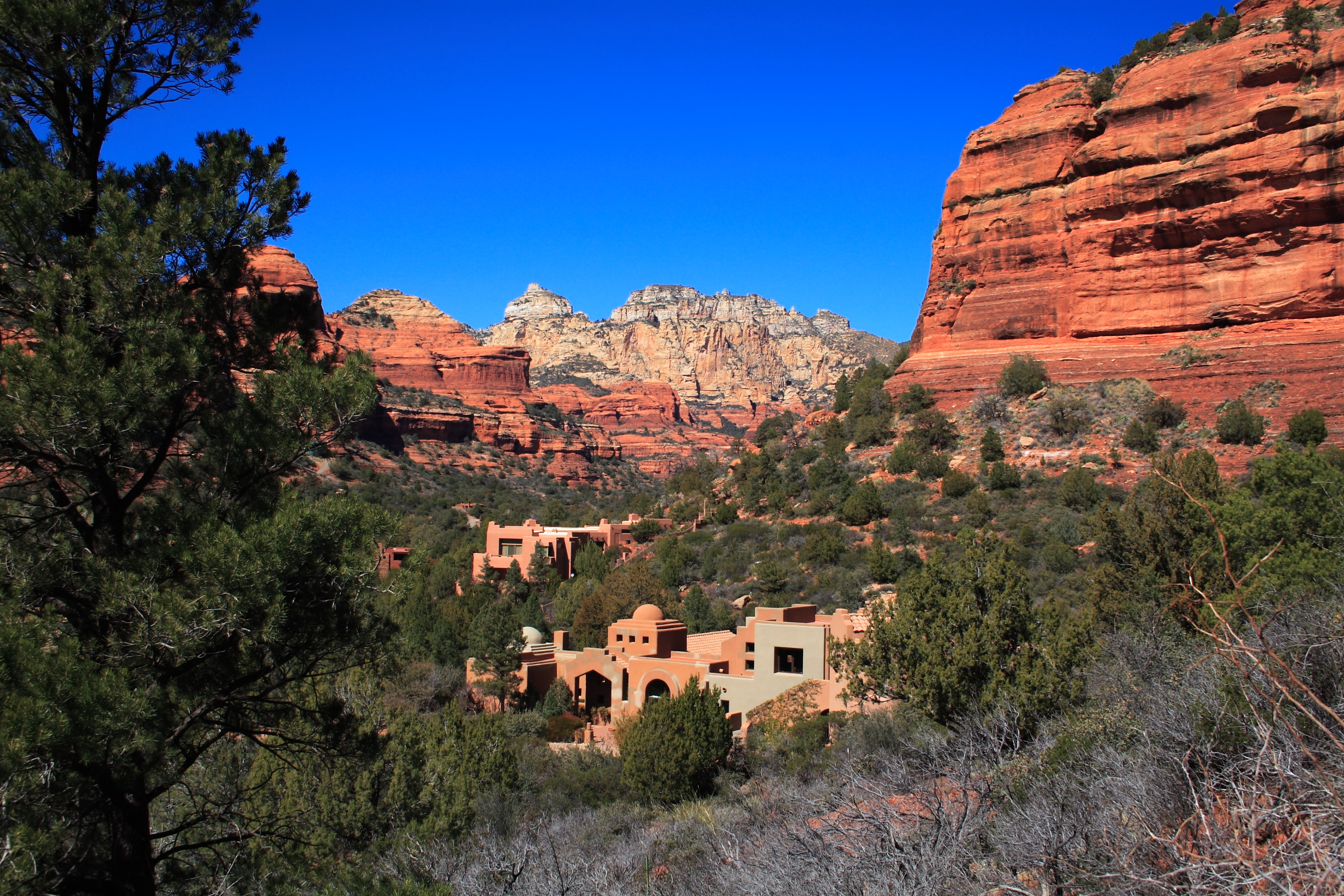
Enchantment Resort near Sedona

Yavapai County is home to Arcosanti, a prototype arcology, developed by Paolo Soleri, and under construction since 1970. Arcosanti is just north of Cordes Junction, Arizona.

Out of Africa Wildlife Park is a private zoo. The park moved to the Camp Verde area from the East Valley in 2005.

Approximately 10 miles (16 km) northwest of the town of Bagdad lies the Upper Burro Creek Wilderness Area, a 27,440-acre (11,105 ha) protected area home to at least 150 species of birds and featuring one of the Arizona desert's few undammed perennial streams.

== Demographics ==
Historical population
Census	Pop.	Note	%±
1870	2,142		—
1880	5,013		134.0%
1890	8,685		73.2%
1900	13,799		58.9%
1910	15,996		15.9%
1920	24,016		50.1%
1930	28,470		18.5%
1940	26,511		−6.9%
1950	24,991		−5.7%
1960	28,912		15.7%
1970	36,733		27.1%
1980	68,145		85.5%
1990	107,714		58.1%
2000	167,517		55.5%
2010	211,033		26.0%
2020	236,209		11.9%
2025 (est.)	252,552	▲	6.9%
U.S. Decennial Census; 1790–1960 1900–1990; 1990–2000 2010–2020

=== Racial and ethnic composition ===
Yavapai County, Arizona – Racial and ethnic composition Note: the US Census treats Hispanic/Latino as an ethnic category. This table excludes Latinos from the racial categories and assigns them to a separate category. Hispanics/Latinos may be of any race.
Race / Ethnicity (NH = Non-Hispanic)	2020	2010	2000	1990	1980
White alone (NH)	77.6% (183,296)	82% (172,968)	86.6% (145,037)	91.3% (98,391)	91.9% (62,617)
Black alone (NH)	0.6% (1,415)	0.5% (1,104)	0.4% (589)	0.3% (305)	0.3% (216)
American Indian alone (NH)	1.4% (3,319)	1.3% (2,799)	1.4% (2,355)	1.5% (1,580)	1.4% (950)
Asian alone (NH)	1.2% (2,802)	0.8% (1,703)	0.5% (833)	0.4% (470)	0.2% (129)
Pacific Islander alone (NH)	0.1% (269)	0.1% (182)	0.1% (128)		
Other race alone (NH)	0.5% (1,071)	0.1% (188)	0.1% (89)	0.1% (69)	0.1% (37)
Multiracial (NH)	4.1% (9,647)	1.6% (3,361)	1.3% (2,110)	—	—
Hispanic/Latino (any race)	14.6% (34,390)	13.6% (28,728)	9.8% (16,376)	6.4% (6,899)	6.2% (4,196)

=== American Community Survey 2025 data ===
The United States Census Bureau estimated that in 2025, Yavapai County’s population was 252.552. It was also estimated that the county's population was 76,63% Non-Hispanic White, 16,42% Hispanic or Latino, 0,76% Non-Hispanic Black, 1,51% Asian, 1,44% Native American, 0,13% Pacific Islander, and 3,10% Multiracial.

Total	Population	Percentage
Non-Hispanic White	193,534	76.63%
Hispanic or Latino	41,477	16.42%
Non-Hispanic Black	1,921	0.76%
Asian	3,821	1.51%
Native American	3,637	1.44%
Pacific Islander	324	0.13%
Non-Hispanic Multiracial	7,838	3.10%

=== 2020 census ===
As of the 2020 census, the county had a population of 236,209. Of the residents, 15.7% were under the age of 18 and 33.8% were 65 years of age or older; the median age was 55.5 years. For every 100 females there were 96.4 males, and for every 100 females age 18 and over there were 94.9 males. 68.0% of residents lived in urban areas and 32.0% lived in rural areas.

The racial makeup of the county was 81.5% White, 0.7% Black or African American, 1.8% American Indian and Alaska Native, 1.2% Asian, 0.1% Native Hawaiian and Pacific Islander, 5.3% from some other race, and 9.4% from two or more races. Hispanic or Latino residents of any race comprised 14.6% of the population.

There were 104,425 households in the county, of which 18.5% had children under the age of 18 living with them and 25.7% had a female householder with no spouse or partner present. About 30.1% of all households were made up of individuals and 17.8% had someone living alone who was 65 years of age or older.

There were 121,154 housing units, of which 13.8% were vacant. Among occupied housing units, 73.5% were owner-occupied and 26.5% were renter-occupied. The homeowner vacancy rate was 2.2% and the rental vacancy rate was 7.5%.

=== 2010 census ===
As of the census of 2010, there were 211,033 people, 90,903 households, and 57,597 families living in the county. The population density was 26.0 inhabitants per square mile (10.0 inhabitants/km^{2}). There were 110,432 housing units at an average density of 13.6 units per square mile (5.3 units/km^{2}). The racial makeup of the county was 89.3% white, 1.7% American Indian, 0.8% Asian, 0.6% black or African American, 0.1% Pacific islander, 4.9% from other races, and 2.5% from two or more races. Those of Hispanic or Latino origin made up 13.6% of the population. The largest ancestry groups were:

- 22.5% German
- 16.0% Irish
- 15.8% English
- 11.5% Mexican
- 5.4% Italian
- 5.0% American
- 4.7% French
- 3.4% Scottish
- 3.1% Polish
- 2.9% Swedish
- 2.6% Norwegian
- 2.6% Scotch-Irish
- 2.5% Dutch
- 1.2% Russian
- 1.0% Welsh
- 1.0% Danish

Of the 90,903 households, 22.8% had children under the age of 18 living with them, 50.3% were married couples living together, 9.0% had a female householder with no husband present, 36.6% were non-families, and 29.1% of all households were made up of individuals. The average household size was 2.28 and the average family size was 2.78. The median age was 49.2 years.

The median income for a household in the county was $43,290 and the median income for a family was $53,499. Males had a median income of $40,854 versus $31,705 for females. The per capita income for the county was $25,527. About 8.8% of families and 13.7% of the population were below the poverty line, including 20.1% of those under age 18 and 6.1% of those age 65 or over.

=== 2000 census ===
As of the census of 2000, there were 167,517 people, 70,171 households, and 46,733 families living in the county. The population density was 21 inhabitants per square mile (8.1 inhabitants/km^{2}). There were 81,730 housing units at an average density of 10 units per square mile (3.9 units/km^{2}). The racial makeup of the county was 91.9% White, 0.4% Black or African American, 1.6% Native American, 0.5% Asian, 0.1% Pacific Islander, 3.6% from other races, and 2.0% from two or more races. 9.8% of the population were Hispanic or Latino of any race.

There were 70,171 households, out of which 23.8% had children under the age of 18 living with them, 55.0% were married couples living together, 8.1% had a female householder with no husband present, and 33.4% were non-families. 26.7% of all households were made up of individuals, and 12.4% had someone living alone who was 65 years of age or older. The average household size was 2.33 and the average family size was 2.79.

In the county, the population was spread out, with 21.1% under the age of 18, 7.1% from 18 to 24, 22.4% from 25 to 44, 27.4% from 45 to 64, and 22.0% who were 65 years of age or older. The median age was 44 years. For every 100 females there were 96.2 males. For every 100 females age 18 and over, there were 93.5 males.

The median income for a household in the county was $34,901, and the median income for a family was $40,910. Males had a median income of $30,738 versus $22,114 for females. The per capita income for the county was $19,727. About 7.9% of families and 11.9% of the population were below the poverty line, including 15.9% of those under age 18 and 6.7% of those age 65 or over.

Yavapai County is defined as the Prescott Metropolitan Statistical Area by the United States Census Bureau.

== Politics ==
Yavapai has historically been the most Republican county in Arizona, though it has become rivalled by Graham and exceeded by Mohave since the turn of the century. No Democratic presidential nominee has won Yavapai County since Harry S. Truman in 1948, and even when the county did go Democratic in the Truman and Roosevelt eras, it typically did so by a smaller margin than any other county in the state.

United States presidential election results for Yavapai County, Arizona
Year	Republican		Democratic		Third party(ies)	
Year	No.	%	No.	%	No.	%
1912	445	18.84%	1,001	42.38%	916	38.78%
1916	1,716	34.44%	2,893	58.06%	374	7.51%
1920	3,625	61.69%	2,251	38.31%	0	0.00%
1924	2,827	41.80%	1,800	26.62%	2,136	31.58%
1928	4,507	57.83%	3,285	42.15%	2	0.03%
1932	2,626	28.73%	6,326	69.20%	189	2.07%
1936	2,794	28.15%	6,628	66.77%	504	5.08%
1940	3,987	38.78%	6,217	60.46%	78	0.76%
1944	3,529	44.33%	4,395	55.21%	36	0.45%
1948	4,287	48.05%	4,439	49.75%	196	2.20%
1952	6,567	64.41%	3,628	35.59%	0	0.00%
1956	6,339	65.66%	3,315	34.34%	0	0.00%
1960	6,813	61.12%	4,325	38.80%	9	0.08%
1964	7,749	57.16%	5,747	42.39%	60	0.44%
1968	8,296	58.44%	3,989	28.10%	1,911	13.46%
1972	12,277	65.77%	3,977	21.30%	2,413	12.93%
1976	12,998	60.18%	7,685	35.58%	917	4.25%
1980	19,823	68.37%	6,664	22.98%	2,507	8.65%
1984	24,802	70.89%	9,609	27.46%	577	1.65%
1988	27,842	64.44%	14,514	33.59%	850	1.97%
1992	23,419	39.42%	18,268	30.75%	17,728	29.84%
1996	29,921	50.29%	21,801	36.64%	7,773	13.06%
2000	40,144	58.84%	24,063	35.27%	4,021	5.89%
2004	53,468	61.05%	33,127	37.82%	988	1.13%
2008	61,192	61.08%	36,889	36.82%	2,104	2.10%
2012	64,468	64.04%	33,918	33.69%	2,281	2.27%
2016	71,330	62.32%	35,590	31.10%	7,530	6.58%
2020	91,527	63.88%	49,602	34.62%	2,151	1.50%
2024	99,346	66.48%	48,717	32.60%	1,365	0.91%

== Communities ==
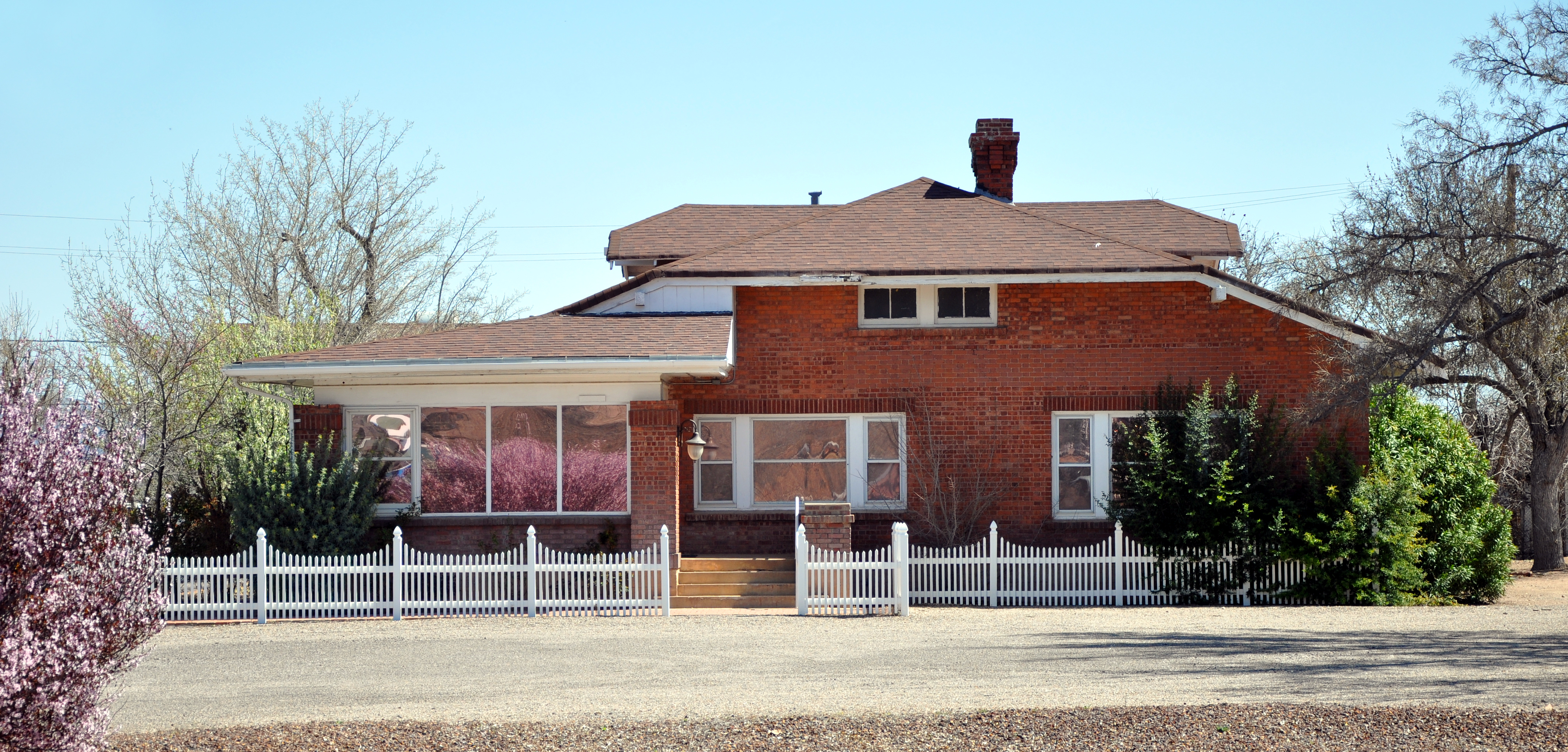
Former Superintendent's Residence, UVX Smelter, Cottonwood. Listed on the National Register of Historic Places.

=== Cities ===
- Cottonwood
- Prescott (county seat)
- Sedona (partly in Coconino County)

=== Towns ===
- Camp Verde
- Chino Valley
- Clarkdale
- Dewey-Humboldt
- Jerome
- Prescott Valley
- Wickenburg (partly in Maricopa County)

=== Census-designated places ===
- Ash Fork
- Bagdad
- Black Canyon City
- Congress
- Cordes Lakes
- Cornville
- Lake Montezuma
- Mayer
- Paulden
- Peeples Valley
- Seligman
- Spring Valley
- Verde Village
- Village of Oak Creek
- Wilhoit
- Williamson
- Yarnell

=== Indian communities ===
- Yavapai-Apache Nation
- Yavapai-Prescott Tribe

=== Unincorporated communities ===
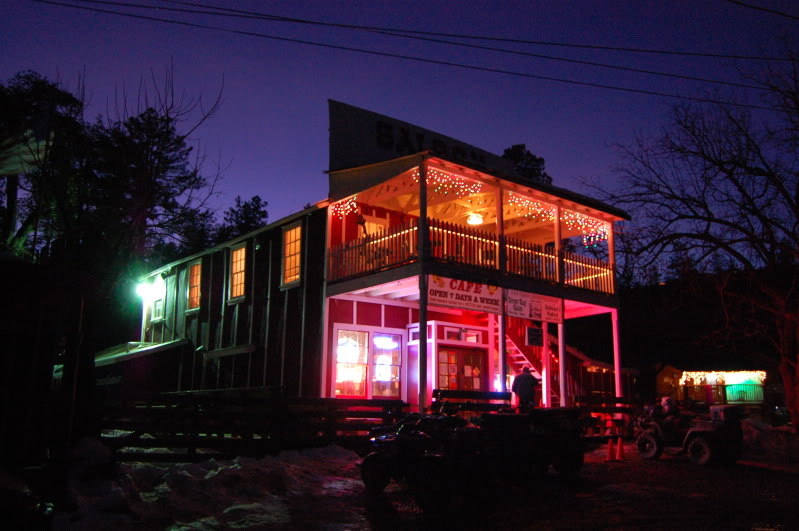
Crown King Saloon, 2011

- Arcosanti
- Bumble Bee
- Cherry
- Cleator
- Clemenceau
- Cordes
- Crown King
- Drake
- Groom Creek
- Iron Springs
- Kirkland
- Ponderosa Park
- Skull Valley
- Tip Top

=== Ghost towns ===
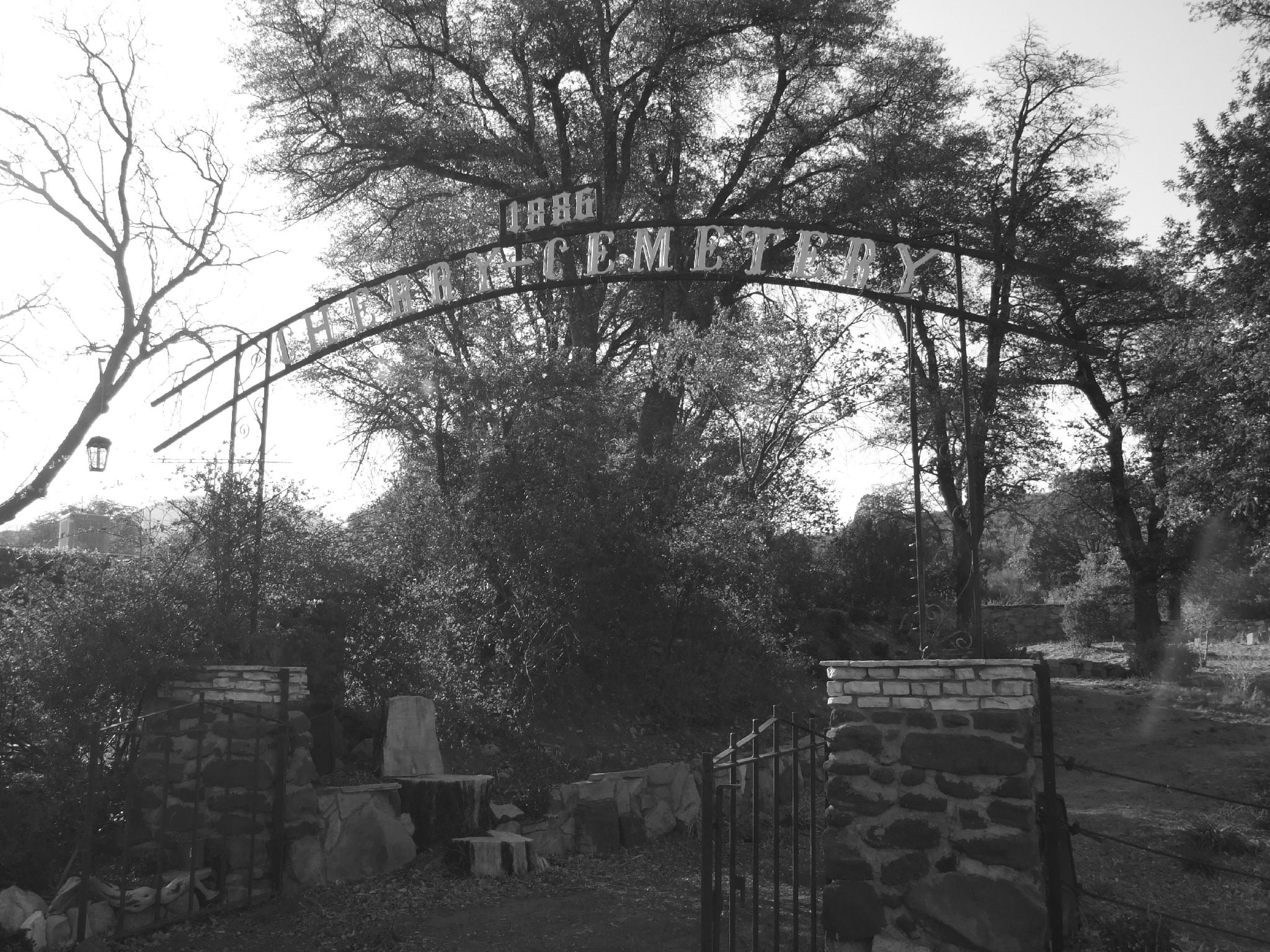
Cherry cemetery, established 1886

- Alexandra
- American Ranch
- Apron Crossing
- Big Bug
- Bradshaw City
- Bumble Bee
- Chaparral
- Catoctin
- Cherry
- Cleator
- Clemenceau
- Congress
- Cordes
- Curtis
- Gillett
- Jerome Junction
- Octave
- Simmons
- Stanton
- Stoddard
- Tip Top
- Weaver
- Columbia

=== Geographic features ===
- Sunset Point is a cliff adjacent to Interstate 17. It has an elevation of 3,091 ft (942 m). The Sunset Point Rest Area, located at the top of the cliff, provides travelers with a scenic view.

=== County population ranking ===
The population ranking of the following table is based on the 2010 census of Yavapai County.

† county seat

Rank	City/Town/etc.	Population (2010 Census)	Municipal type	Incorporated
1	Peoria (most of population in Maricopa County)	154,065	City	1954
2	† Prescott	39,843	City	1883
3	Prescott Valley	38,822	Town	1978
4	Verde Village	11,605	CDP	
5	Cottonwood	11,265	City	1960
6	Camp Verde	10,873	Town	1986
7	Chino Valley	10,817	Town	1970
8	Sedona (partly in Coconino County)	10,031	City	1988
9	Wickenburg (Most of population in Maricopa County)	6,363	Town	1909
10	Village of Oak Creek (Big Park)	6,147	CDP	
11	Williamson	5,438	CDP	
12	Paulden	5,231	CDP	
13	Lake Montezuma	4,706	CDP	
14	Clarkdale	4,097	Town	1957
15	Dewey-Humboldt	3,894	Town	2004
16	Cornville	3,280	CDP	
17	Black Canyon City	2,837	CDP	
18	Cordes Lakes	2,633	CDP	
19	Congress	1,975	CDP	
20	Bagdad	1,876	CDP	
21	Mayer	1,497	CDP	
22	Spring Valley	1,148	CDP	
23	Wilhoit	868	CDP	
24	Yarnell	649	CDP	
25	Seligman	445	CDP	
26	Jerome	444	Town	1899
27	Peeples Valley	428	CDP	
28	Ash Fork	396	CDP	

== Education ==
School districts include:

Unified:

- Ash Fork Joint Unified School District
- Bagdad Unified School District
- Camp Verde Unified School District
- Chino Valley Unified District
- Humboldt Unified School District
- Mayer Unified School District
- Prescott Unified School District
- Seligman Unified School District
- Sedona-Oak Creek Unified School District
- Wickenburg Unified School District

Secondary:

- Mingus Union High School District

Elementary:

- Beaver Creek School District
- Canon Elementary School District
- Clarkdale-Jerome Elementary School District
- Congress Elementary School District
- Cottonwood-Oak Creek School District
- Crown King Elementary School District
- Hillside Elementary District
- Kirkland Elementary School District
- Pine-Strawberry Elementary School District
- Skull Valley School District
- Williamson Valley Elementary School District
- Yarnell Elementary School District

Former school districts:

- Walnut Grove Elementary School District – Closed in 2021

== See also ==
- National Register of Historic Places listings in Yavapai County, Arizona

== General sources ==
- Fuis, G. S. (1996). The geology and mechanics of formation of the Fort Rock dome, Yavapai County, Arizona. U.S. Geological Survey Professional Paper 1266. Washington, D.C.: U.S. Geological Survey, U.S. Department of the Interior. doi:10.3133/pp1266.
