= Walnut Grove Elementary School District =

Former school district in Yavapai County, Arizona

Walnut Grove Elementary School District #7 was a school district in Yavapai County, Arizona. It operated a school in the Walnut Grove area, then became a sending school district.

It served Walnut Grove and Castle Hot Springs.

== History ==
The school district began circa 1875 and its final building, a one room schoolhouse, was established in 1930. The schoolhouse was along the Hassayampa River. Randy Collier of The Arizona Republic described the building as "a small clapboard structure".

In February 1984 it had seven students, and in May 1984 it had nine students, ranging from 6 years old to 14 years old and with three Mexican ranch-residing students ungraded, and one teacher. The three Mexican children were not legally in the United States at the time. Their undocumented status became a political issue with the adult residents while the other children at the school played and socialized with them like with each other.

Peter Schwepker of The Arizona Republic stated that the student teacher ratio being low meant a lot of individualized attention in the classroom as well as flexibility with scheduling. At the same time its costs related to transportation and salary of faculty increased and there were concerns that the school could be closed. In February 1984 the annual cost of the school was $65,000. At that time a total of 20 families lived in the district.

On November 14, 1984, the school board voted to change the school from K–8 to K–6, transferring the last two grades, which included two students, to schools in Prescott, Arizona. By December 1984 the sole teacher was put on paid leave, and a mother of a student served as a substitute teacher.

At the end of the district's life it did not operate any schools, and most of the students within the district borders did home schooling. The district sent students opting for traditional schooling to Kirkland Elementary School (K–8) of Kirkland Elementary School District #23 and Prescott High School of Prescott Unified School District.

On June 30, 2021, the district was disestablished due to insufficient numbers of students. The Kirkland district received the Walnut Grove territory to the north. The southern portion, including Castle Hot Springs Resort, was given to the Wickenburg Unified School District. As of 2021 no K–12 students lived in the southern section, and most of the land there was owned by the State of Arizona or the federal Bureau of Land Management. The assets of the Walnut Grove district were given to these two districts and the Western Maricopa Education Center (West-MEC).

== See also ==
Sending school districts in Arizona:

- Chevelon Butte Elementary School District
- Congress Elementary School District (was a sending district prior to 2001)

Non-operating school districts (school districts which do not operate any schools) in New Jersey:

- Cape May Point School District
- Sea Isle City School District
