= Beaver Creek School District =

School district in Arizona, United States

Beaver Creek School District 26

Location
- 4810 E. Beaver Creek Rd. Rimrock, Arizona 86335 United States

Other information
- Website: www.bcs.k12.az.us

Beaver Creek School District 26 is a public school district based in Yavapai County, Arizona, United States.

It includes Lake Montezuma census-designated place. It also includes the community of McGuireville.
