= Cherry, Arizona =

Ghost town in Yavapai County, Arizona

- Ghost town
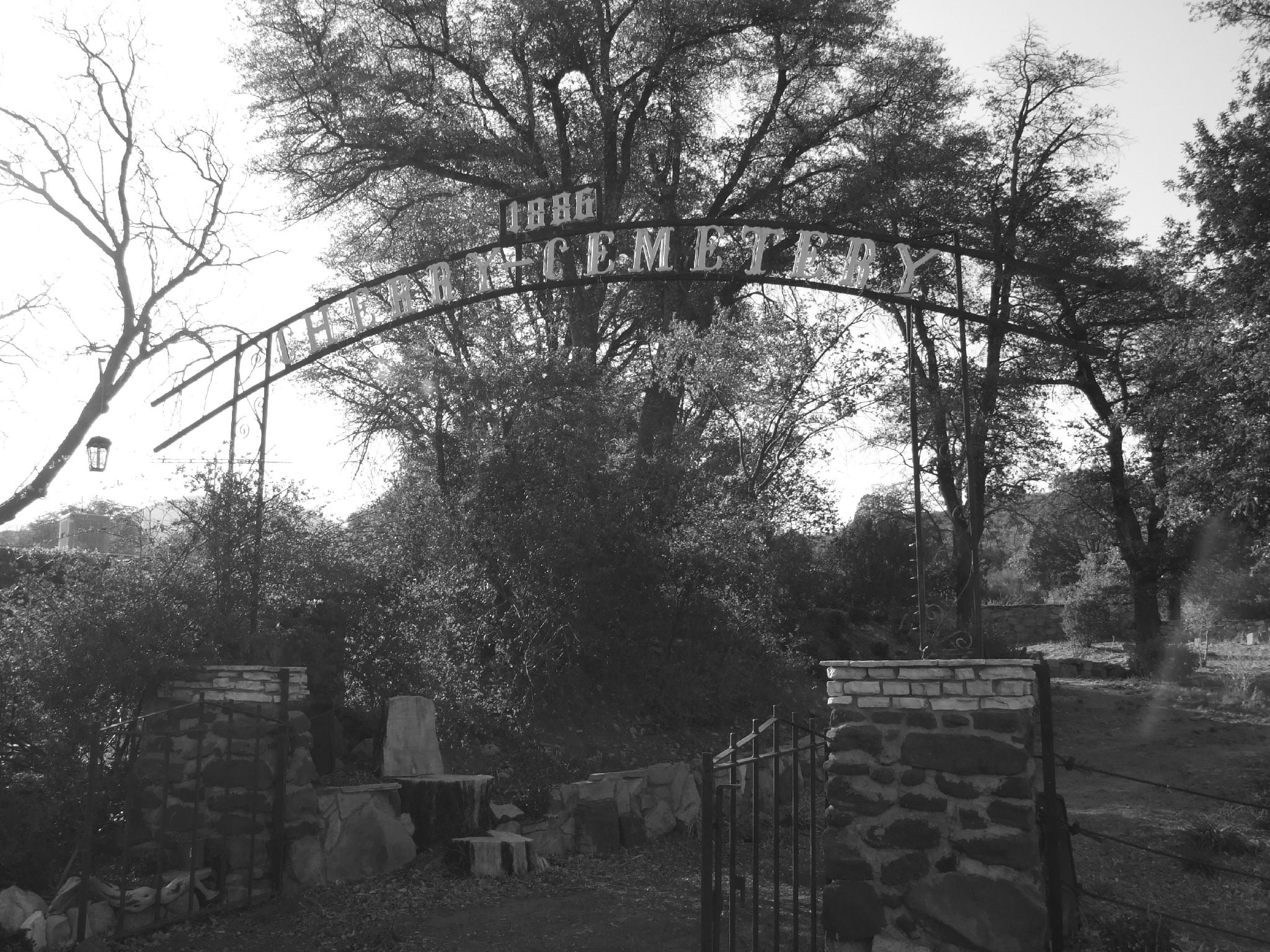
- Cherry cemetery, est. 1886

- Location within the state of Arizona Cherry, Arizona (the United States)
- Coordinates: 34°35′17″N 112°02′31″W
- Country: United States
- State: Arizona
- County: Yavapai
- Elevation: 5,007 ft (1,526 m)
- Time zone: UTC-7 (Mountain (MST))
- GNIS feature ID: 27538

Cherry is a mining ghost town in central Yavapai County, Arizona, United States, between Dewey and Camp Verde.

== History ==
Cherry's post office was established March 3, 1884, and discontinued March 15, 1943. Notable mines in the area include the Federal, Bunker, Sunnybrook, Logan and Gold Bullion mines. About 400 people lived and worked in Cherry during its prime. At present, Cherry is a small retirement and vacation-home community. A number of the original buildings are still in use. The Cherry cemetery has several graves from the late 19th and early 20th centuries.

== Education ==
It is in the Humboldt Unified School District.
