= Williamson Valley (Arizona) =

Valley in Yavapai County, Arizona

Williamson Valley, also known as Williamsons Valley, is a valley in Yavapai County, Arizona. The mouth of the valley is at an elevation of 4,442 feet / 1,354 meters, where it meets the Big Chino Valley. Its head is located at an elevation of 4,600 feet, at 34°46′48″N 112°39′37″W.

It is partly or all in Williamson, Arizona, a CDP area which also includes part or all of Mint Valley.
