= Don Corbitt =

American football player (1924–1993)

No. 54
- Position: Center

Personal information
- Born: April 1, 1924; Creston, Iowa, U.S.
- Died: September 3, 1993 (aged 69); Phoenix, Arizona, U.S.
- Listed height: 6 ft 4 in (1.93 m)
- Listed weight: 224 lb (102 kg)

Career information
- High school: Prescott (Prescott, Arizona)
- College: Arizona
- NFL draft: 1948: 28th round, 258th overall pick

Career history
- Washington Redskins (1948)

Career NFL statistics
- Games played: 3
- Stats at Pro Football Reference

Donald Oliver Corbitt (April 1, 1924 – September 3, 1993) was an American professional football offensive lineman in the National Football League (NFL) for the Washington Redskins. He played college football at the University of Arizona and was drafted in the 28th round of the 1948 NFL draft.

== Early life ==
Donald Oliver Corbitt was born on April 1, 1924, in Creston, Iowa. He attended Prescott High School in Arizona. He played football at the University of Arizona.

== Career ==
Corbitt played center. He was drafted 258th overall in the 28th round of the 1948 NFL draft by the Washington Redskins.

Corbitt served in the United States Navy. He served one term on the Phoenix Municipal Aeronautics Advisory Board. He was a member of the Board of Directors of the Tanner Cos. and American Cable TV.

== Personal life ==
Corbitt married Joan. They had four children, Corinne, Elisa, Donald A. and Robert C.

Corbitt died on September 3, 1993, in Phoenix, Arizona.
