= Skull Valley, Arizona =

Populated place in Yavapai County, Arizona

- town
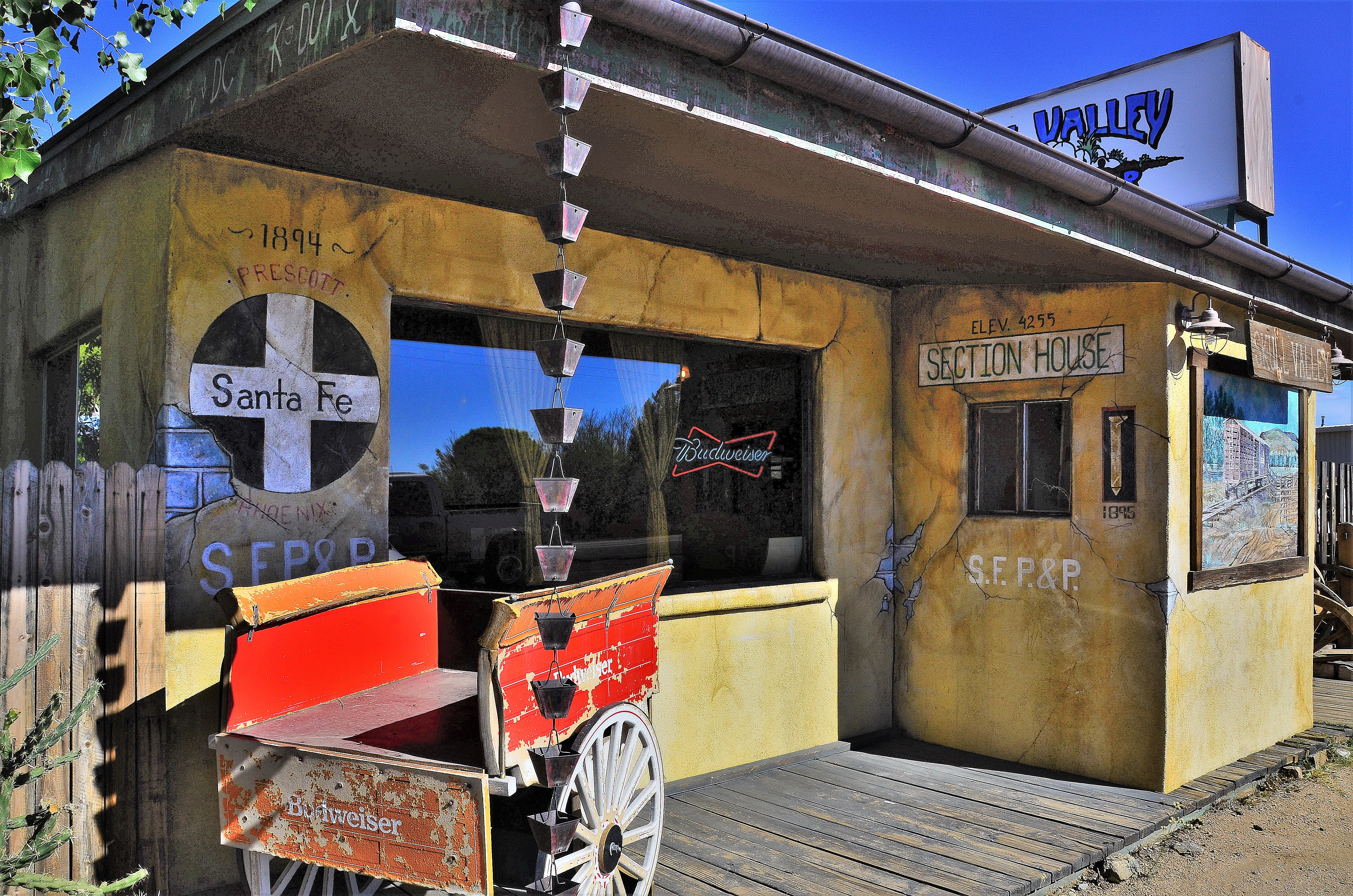
- Old railroad building

- Location within the state of Arizona Skull Valley, Arizona (the United States)
- Coordinates: 34°30′19″N 112°41′08″W
- Country: United States
- State: Arizona
- County: Yavapai
- Elevation: 4,265 ft (1,300 m)

Population (2000)
  - Total: 743
- Time zone: UTC-7 (Mountain (MST))
- ZIP codes: 86338
- Area code: 928
- GNIS feature ID: 34495

Skull Valley (Yavapai: Pa:qwawa Kyo) is a small, unincorporated town in Yavapai County, Arizona, United States. It is located seventeen miles west of Prescott. The community has a post office. As of the 2020 census, the population in the Skull Valley Elementary School District was greater than 800 people.

== History ==
Yavapai historian Maurice Crandall writes that:

Skull Valley, known to us as Bakwaeguó ("Hair," so named because the mountain nearby resembles a pile of hair), was the site of an 1866 massacre of Yavapais. Whites who settled in the area years later named it Skull Valley because of the large number of Yavapai skulls they found there.

According to Arizona state historian Marshall Trimble, the name is derived from the skeletal remains caused by a battle between Yavapai and Maricopa people.

Skull Valley's population was 21 in 1920, and was 100 in the 1960 Census.

Skull Valley was home to George Phippen (1915–1966), a well known western artist, co-founder and first president of the Cowboy Artists of America.

The area's history is preserved by the Skull Valley Historical Society, which operates a free museum. Robert L. Pearson, a native of the area and retired wildlife manager, created an online photo gallery of the area's insects. In mid-2019, Skull Valley was featured on S.B. Schreffler's Revisiting History in which Robert L. Pearson appeared as a guest on the Revisiting People series.

Two cemeteries remain from years ago: the Old Skull Valley Cemetery and a newer Christopherson Cemetery.

== Education ==
Skull Valley is served by the Skull Valley School District.
