= Worth (magazine) =

American financial, wealth management, and lifestyle magazine

- Format: Magazine, Digital and Events
- Owner: Clarim Holdings LLC
- Editor: various
- Founded: 1986
- Language: English
- Headquarters: New York City, U.S.
- Circulation: undisclosed
- ISSN: 1931-9908
- Website: www.worth.com

Worth is an American financial, wealth management, and life-style magazine founded in 1986 and purchased by Clarim Holdings in 2019. The magazine addresses financial, legal, and life-style issues for high-net-worth individuals. The content focuses on various topics including business, technology, philanthropy, finance, climate, and sustainability and life-style.
