= Williamson Valley (California) =

Valley in California, United States

Williamson Valley is a valley in the Gabilan Range in San Benito County, California. Its mouth is at an elevation of 2,205 feet / 672 meters. Its head is found at an elevation of 2,360 feet, at 36°32′06″N 121°17′51″W.
