= Skull Valley School District =

School district in Yavapai County, Arizona

Coordinates: 34.5022°N 112.6865°W

Skull Valley Elementary School
- 3150 South Old Skull Valley Road, Skull Valley, Arizona 86338; United States

Information
- Type: Public school
- Principal: Brandi Vastine
- Faculty: 4
- Enrollment: 14
- Website: http://www.skullvalleyschool.org/home

Skull Valley School District is a school district in Yavapai County, Arizona. It operates a single public K-8 school, Skull Valley Elementary School, in Skull Valley. The school has four teachers and generally 20–30 students. Enrollment in 2017 was 14 students.

As of 1976 the Prescott Unified School District takes secondary students from the Skull Valley district, as it is required to under law. The district operates Prescott High School.

The school district has leased land to the Skull Valley Historical Society, which has a museum next door to the school, and the historical school building itself is a significant historical structure in the area.

As of the 2003 census, the population in the Skull Valley Elementary School District was 525 people.

The school has two classrooms.

== Historical significance ==
Although official records do not indicate this, area settlers recall that a school was established in 1878. The school had been formally established by the early 1900s, when it offered education to children in all of the grades.

The two-room schoolhouse structure, built in 1925, still stands on the school grounds.

Despite extensive consolidations over time in Yavapai County, Arizona, Skull Valley still has a school. The new/current elementary school building sits on the same land, next to the historical schoolhouse. Students above the 8th grade are bused to Prescott to attend high school. The Prescott Unified School District operates Prescott High School.

== Programs ==
In 1988 it began participating in a county-led program to improve students' emotional well-being, aimed at school districts with total student populations under 600.

It participates in a track meet intended for low population schools in the area. The track meet, which Hillside Elementary School District, Kirkland Elementary School District, and Yarnell Elementary School District also participate in, began in 1957.
