= Yarnell Elementary School District =

School district in Arizona, United States

Address
- 18912 Hays Ranch Road Peeples Valley, Arizona, 86332; United States

District information
- Type: Public
- Grades: PreK–8
- NCES District ID: 0409510

Students and staff
- Students: 37
- Teachers: 4.3
- Staff: 9.48
- Student–teacher ratio: 8.6

Other information
- Website: www.modelcreekschool.org

Yarnell Elementary School District (YESD) is a school district headquartered in Peeples Valley, Arizona. It has one school, Model Creek School.

The school district area includes Peeples Valley and a section of Yarnell.

The school has a combined principal and superintendent.

After the 8th grade, students move on to Prescott High School of the Prescott Unified School District. Previously students could choose between that school and Wickenburg High School of the Wickenburg Unified School District, but in order to reduce taxes, the district board removed the Wickenburg option in November 2018.

== History ==
For a period of time the Peeples Valley School District sent students to the Yarnell district, as the former did not operate any schools. On July 1, 1980, the Yarnell district absorbed the Peeples Valley district.

Prior to the Yarnell Hill Fire in 2013, the school had around 50 students. The student population fell to around 32 because the fire had damaged housing. This meant that the school's funding was halved.

In 2014 its enrollment was 30, and its budget was negative $150,000. In 2014 the board of directors agreed to keep the school in operation.

== Programs ==
It participates in a track meet intended for low population schools in the area. The track meet, which Hillside Elementary School District, Kirkland Elementary School District, and Skull Valley Elementary School District also participate in, began in 1957.
