= Forepaugh, Arizona =

- Populated place
- Location within the state of Arizona Forepaugh (the United States)
- Coordinates: 33°58′17″N 113°02′47″W
- Country: United States
- State: Arizona
- County: Maricopa
- Elevation: 2,303 ft (702 m)
- Time zone: UTC-7 (Mountain (MST))
  - Summer (DST): UTC-7 (MST)
- Area code: 928
- FIPS code: 04-23410
- GNIS feature ID: 24080

Forepaugh is a populated place situated in Maricopa County, Arizona, United States. It has an estimated elevation of 2,303 feet (702 m) above sea level. It is located along the Arizona and California Railroad.

== Education ==
Forepaugh is in the Wickenburg Unified School District.
