= Wickenburg High School =

Public school in Arizona

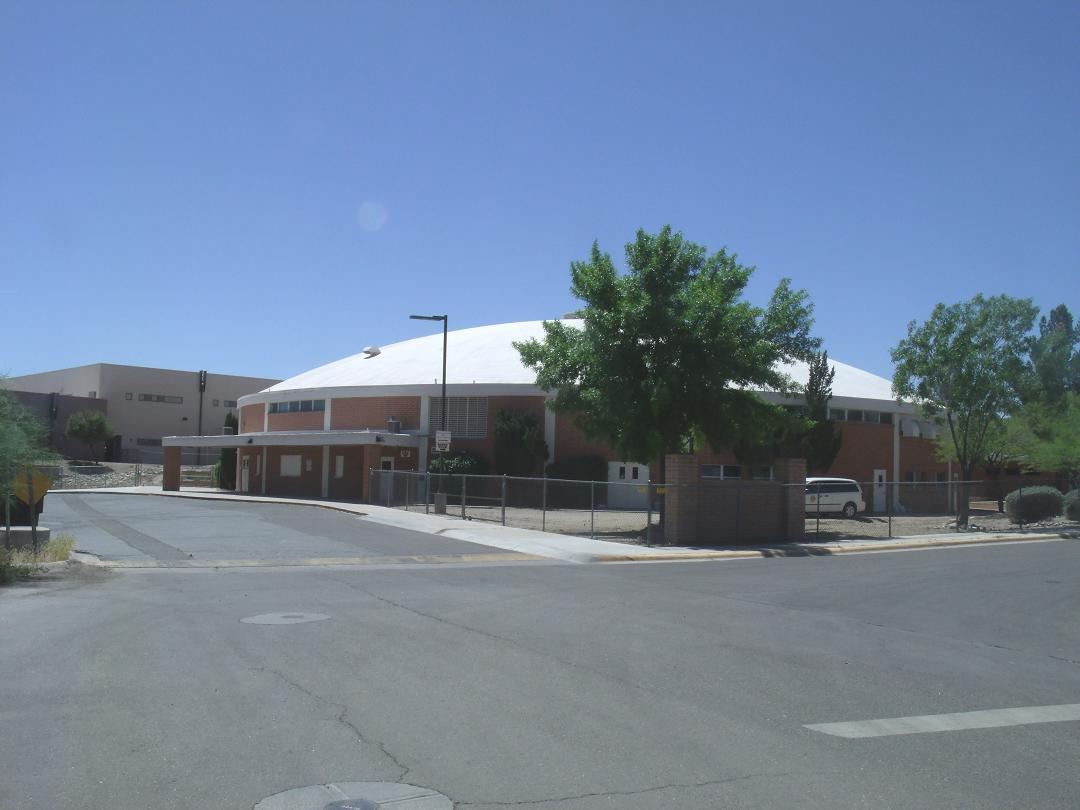
- The former Wickenburg High School building
- Arizona 85390; United States

Information
- School type: Public high school
- School district: Wickenburg Unified School District
- Principal: Garrett Maier
- Grades: 9–12
- Enrollment: 403 (2024–2025)
- Colors: Purple and gold
- Mascot: Wranglers
- Information: 928.684.6600
- Website: whs.wickenburgschools.org

- Wickenburg High School Gymnasium
- U.S. National Register of Historic Places
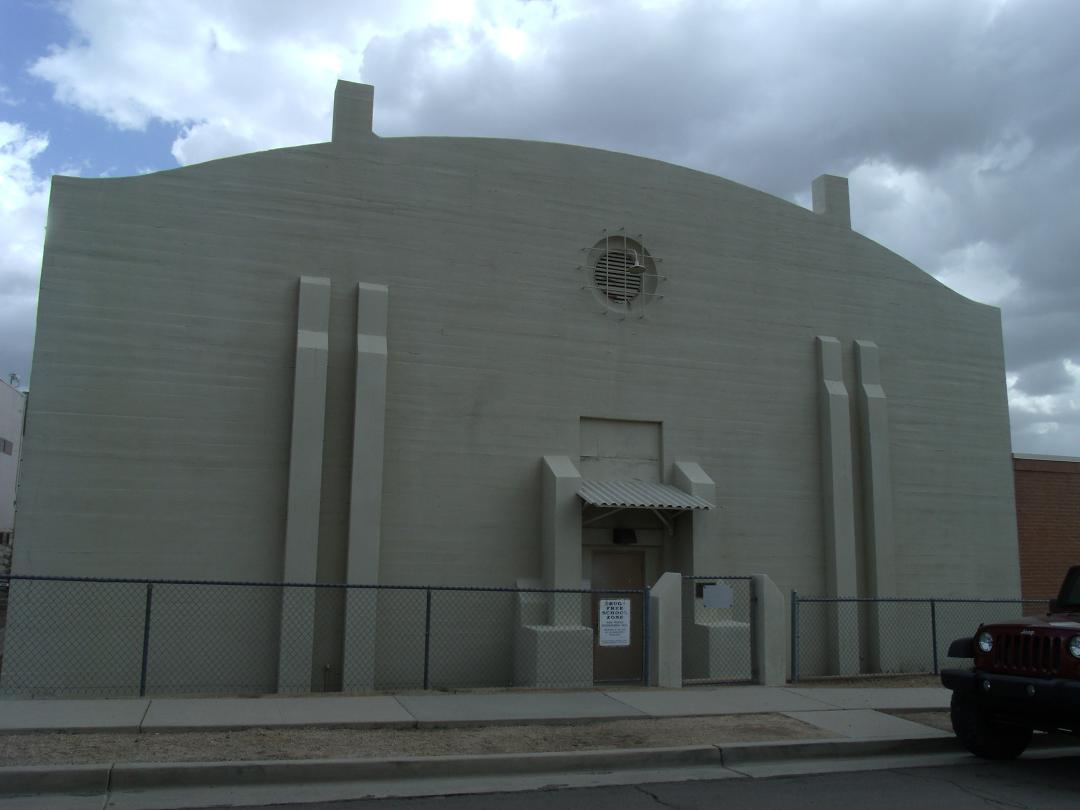
- Wickenburg High School Gymnasium

- Location within Arizona Location within the United States
- Location: 1090 S. Vulture Mine Rd. Wickenburg, Arizona
- Coordinates: 33°58′3″N 112°43′36″W
- Area: approx. 10 acres
- Built: 1925/1934/1999
- Architect: Lescher & Mahoney
- Architectural style: Colonial Revival/Moderne, WPA Moderne
- MPS: Wickenburg MRA
- NRHP reference No.: 86001595, 86001594
- Added to NRHP: July 10, 1986

Wickenburg High School is a high school in Wickenburg, Arizona under the jurisdiction of the Wickenburg Unified School District#9. The original campus was built at 101 Coconino St. in 1925, with the gym annex added in 1935. In 1999, the high school was relocated to its current building at 1090 S. Vulture Mine Rd.

== Service area ==
Within Maricopa County, the school district, and therefore Wickenburg High's attendance boundary, includes that county's portion of Wickenburg and sections of Buckeye and Surprise. Within Yavapai County it includes that county's portion of Wickenburg and that county's section of Peoria.

Congress Elementary School District sends high school students to Wickenburg High. Previously students from the Yarnell Elementary School District (model Creek School) could select Wickenburg High as an option for high school, but in order to reduce taxes, the Yarnell Elementary district board removed the Wickenburg option in November 2018.

== History ==
The original high school campus is double-listed on the National Register of Historic Places in Arizona. The original Colonial Revival high school and annex were completed in 1925 and 1935, respectively. In 1934, the Works Progress Administration-built gymnasium was completed in a Moderne style. It is the town's only WPA building and the larger of two cast-in-place concrete structures in the town; it also is separately listed. The two buildings were put on the NRHP at the same time (July 1986). The original high school campus now serves as the Wrangler Event Center and the district office for WUSD #9.

During the evacuation period of the Yarnell Hill Fire, the school was used as an evacuation shelter for the nearby town of Yarnell.

== Academic Course Offerings ==
Wickenburg High School offers academic courses in the areas listed below. The high school offers several Career & Technical Education (CTE) programs including Agriculture, Business Management, Coding, and Culinary Arts; each of which have their own Career & Technical Student Organization such as FFA.

1. English
2. Mathematics
3. Science
4. Social Studies
5. International Language
6. Fine & Performing Arts
7. Career & Technical Education
8. Physical Education
