= Friendly Corners, Arizona =

- Populated place
- Location within the state of Arizona Friendly Corners (the United States)
- Coordinates: 32°37′04″N 111°33′03″W
- Country: United States
- State: Arizona
- County: Pinal
- Elevation: 1,663 ft (507 m)
- Time zone: UTC-7 (Mountain (MST))
  - Summer (DST): UTC-7 (MST)
- Area code: 520
- FIPS code: 04-25930
- GNIS feature ID: 4861

Friendly Corners is a populated place situated in Pinal County, Arizona, United States. It has an estimated elevation of 1,663 feet (507 m) above sea level.
