= Wickenburg Unified School District =

School district in Arizona, United States

Address
- 101 Coconino Street Wickenburg, Arizona, 85390; United States

District information
- Type: Public
- Grades: PreK–12
- NCES District ID: 0409190

Students and staff
- Students: 1,201
- Teachers: 73.15
- Staff: 80.45
- Student–teacher ratio: 16.42

Other information
- Website: www.wickenburgschools.org

Wickenburg Unified School District #9 (WUSD) is a school district headquartered in Wickenburg, Arizona.

== History ==
The school district serving Wickenburg was established as School District No.9 on October 6, 1879. Its original boundaries extended along the Hassayampa River and covered Wickenberg and the surrounding area.

In 1997, the question of whether the Wickenburg district and the Congress Elementary School District should merge was put on the ballot in both districts. Wickenburg USD residents voted in favor.

In 2020, Barbara Remondini became the superintendent.

On June 30, 2021, the Walnut Grove Elementary School District was disestablished due to insufficient numbers of students, so the southern portion was given to Wickenburg Unified. As of 2021 no K-12 students lived in that section, and most of it was owned by the State of Arizona or the federal Bureau of Land Management.

== Attendance area ==
It includes sections of Maricopa and Yavapai counties, totaling 916 square miles (2,370 km^{2}). Additionally, in 2021 the district had some students from La Paz County.

It includes slivers of Buckeye and Surprise in Maricopa County and the Yavapai County section of Peoria. It also includes all of its namesake city of Wickenburg, which spills into both counties. It also serves Allah and Forepaugh.

In addition, Congress Elementary School District sends high school students to Wickenburg High. Previously students from the Yarnell Elementary School District (Model Creek School) could select Wickenburg High as an option for high school, but in order to reduce taxes, the Yarnell Elementary district board removed the Wickenburg option in November 2018. Prior to 2001, when the Congress K-8 school opened, all levels of students in the Congress district went to Wickenburg schools.

== Schools ==
- Wickenburg High School
- Vulture Peak Middle School
- Festival Foothills Elementary School
- Hassayampa Elementary School
- Wickenburg Virtual Academy
