= Prescott High School (Arizona) =

- Home of the Badgers

Location
- 1050 N. Ruth Street; Prescott, Arizona; United States; 34°33′47″N 112°28′41″W

Information
- Type: Public
- School district: Prescott Unified School District
- CEEB code: 030345
- Principal: Adam Neely
- Staff: 63.15 (FTE)
- Grades: 9–12
- Enrollment: 1,466 (2023–2024)
- Student to teacher ratio: 23.21
- Colors: Blue and gold
- Mascot: Badger
- Website: phs.prescottschools.com

Prescott High School is a public high school located in the city of Prescott, Arizona. It is the only high school in the Prescott Unified School District. Historically, Prescott High School drew students from various adjacent school districts, mostly in Prescott Valley (Humboldt Unified School District) and Chino Valley, Arizona (Chino Valley Unified School District); those districts later established their own high schools.

== Service area ==
In addition to almost all of Prescott it serves most of Williamson and sections of Prescott Valley. It also includes Groom Creek, Iron Springs, and Potato Patch.

As of 1976 the district takes in high school students from the Hillside Elementary School District, Kirkland Elementary School District, and Skull Valley School District, as it is required to under law. It also takes students from the Yarnell Elementary School District.

Additionally it took high school students from the Walnut Grove Elementary School District, until that district dissolved in 2021.

== Academics and programs ==
PHS offers a solid academic program, including Advanced Placement and Honors courses. Courses offered include Business & Technology, English, Family & Consumer Science, Fine Arts, Foreign Language, Industrial Technology, Air Force Junior Reserve Officer Training Corps, Mathematics, PEAK, Physical Education, Science, Social Studies, and Special Education. Students also have the opportunity to participate in athletics, theater, orchestra, choir, band, jazz band, Academic Decathlon, and vocational education programs.

== Awards and accreditation ==
The Arizona Department of Education has awarded Prescott High School the distinguished label of "Excelling School" for the last two years. Since 1917, the school has been continuously accredited by North Central Association of Colleges and Schools.

== Athletics ==
Prescott High School is a member of the Arizona Interscholastic Association and is classified in the 4A Conference for schools with an enrollment of 950–1899 students.

SPRING sports include Track and field-Boys / Girls (Var/JV), Tennis-Boys / Girls (Var/JV), Softball-Girls (Var/JV/Frosh), and Baseball-Boys (Var/JV/Frosh).

FALL sports include Badminton-Girls (Var/JV), Cross Country-Boys / Girls (Var/JV), Golf (Varsity only), Football (Var/JV/Frosh), Swimming-Boys / Girls (Varsity only), and Volleyball-Girls (Var/JV/Frosh).

WINTER sports include Basketball-Boys (Var/JV/Frosh), Basketball-Girls (Var/JV/Frosh), Soccer-Boys (Var/JV), Soccer-Girls (Var/JV), and Wrestling (Var/JV/Frosh).

== Fine arts ==
Prescott High School has a Fine arts program. It consists of:

Art: Art 1–2, Art 3–4, Art 5–6, Art 7–8, Art AP, Sculpture, Adobe photoshop

Drama: Drama 1–2, Methods of Theater, Music Theatre

Drama productions: Drama Productions 1–2, Drama Productions 3–4

Choir: Women's Choir, Chorale, Show Choir

Band: Orchestra, Symphonic Band, Percussion/Guard, Wind Ensemble, Jazz Ensemble, Marching Band,

== Foreign languages ==
Prescott High School offers four different languages, whose levels combined total 11 classes.

Offered languages: French 1–2, French 3–4, French 5–6, German 1–2, German 3–4, Japanese 1–2, Japanese 3–4, Spanish 1–2, Spanish 3–4, Spanish 5–6, Spanish 1–2 for native speakers

== Notable alumni ==
- Ken Bennett, former Secretary of State of Arizona
- Robert M. Brutinel, Chief Justice of the Arizona Supreme Court
- Skylor Clinton, professional wrestler
- Don Corbitt (1924–1993), American football player
- John Denny, Major League Baseball pitcher from 1974 to 1986, won the Cy Young award in 1983
- Calvin C. Goode, the longest serving member of the Phoenix city council
- Fiorello LaGuardia, Mayor of New York City
- Kristin Mayes, Arizona Attorney General and a former Republican member of the Arizona Corporation Commission
- Skyler Page, creator of the TV show Clarence
- Jason Pridie, current MLB player (Minnesota Twins, New York Mets, Philadelphia Phillies, Arizona Diamondbacks)
- Nat Russo, fantasy fiction author, Class of 1988
- Brian Stauffer, award-winning illustrator
- David Yetman, American academic expert on Sonora, Mexico and an Emmy award-winning media presenter on the world's deserts; class of 1959
