= Congress Elementary School District =

School district in Arizona, United States

Address
- 26400 South Tenderfoot Hill Road Congress, Arizona, 85332; United States

District information
- Type: Public
- Grades: PreK–8
- NCES District ID: 0402220

Students and staff
- Students: 79
- Teachers: 9.5
- Staff: 12.1
- Student–teacher ratio: 8.32

Other information
- Website: www.congressdistrict.org

Congress Elementary School District is a K-8 school district headquartered in Congress, Arizona. It operates Congress Elementary School.

The district includes the Congress census-designated place and a portion of the Yarnell CDP.

The district sends high school students to Wickenburg High School of the Wickenburg Unified School District.

== History ==
Previously the Congress district did not operate any schools. Students attended Wickenburg USD for all grade levels.

At one point the Walnut Creek School consolidated into the Congress district.

Congress Elementary School opened in 2001 with all grade levels in elementary and middle school. Its initial enrollment was 110.

In 2010 the student enrollment was 112. That year the district began the practice of filing lawsuits against parents who had filed multiple requests to make information public, asking to set a condition so only a judge could allow their requests to go through. The district argued that the parents were harassing the district employees. This caused the San Francisco Examiner to write a critical article about this. Congress Elementary School District v. Warren resulted.

== Student performance ==
In 2015 its AZMerit scores were 77% for mathematics and 66% for English. 80 of its students took the exams.

== See also ==
Sending school districts in Arizona:

- Chevelon Butte School District
- Walnut Grove Elementary School District
