= Humboldt Unified School District =

School district in Yavapai County, Arizona

Address
- 6411 North Robert Road Prescott Valley, Arizona, 86314; United States

District information
- Type: Public
- Grades: PreK–12
- NCES District ID: 0403870

Students and staff
- Students: 5,244
- Teachers: 286.69
- Staff: 355.76
- Student–teacher ratio: 18.29

Other information
- Website: www.humboldtunified.com

Humboldt Unified School District is a school district based in Prescott Valley, Arizona, United States.

It includes most of Prescott Valley, all of Dewey Humboldt, small portions of Chino Valley and Mayer. It also includes Cherry.

It has about 5,800 students, 10 schools, and 800 employees. The district's superintendent is Dr. Christine Griffin.

It operates the following schools:

- Bradshaw Mountain High School
- Bradshaw Mountain Middle School
- Glassford Hill Middle School
- Coyote Springs Elementary School
- Granville Elementary School
- Humboldt Elementary School
- Lake Valley Elementary School
- Liberty K-8 Traditional School
- Mountain View Elementary School
- Bright Futures Preschool
