= Prescott Unified School District =

School district in Arizona, United States

Address
- 300 East Gurley Street Prescott, Arizona, 86301; United States

District information
- Type: Public
- Grades: PreK–12
- NCES District ID: 0406730

Students and staff
- Students: 3,819
- Teachers: 195.89
- Staff: 212.61
- Student–teacher ratio: 19.5

Other information
- Website: www.prescottschools.com

The Prescott Unified School District (PUSD) is a school district serving Prescott, Arizona. It operates four elementary schools, two middle schools, and one high school. The superintendent is Joe Howard.

== Service area ==
In addition to almost all of Prescott it serves most of Williamson and sections of Prescott Valley. It also includes Groom Creek, Iron Springs, and Potato Patch.

As of 1976 the district takes in high school students from the Hillside Elementary School District, Kirkland Elementary School District, and Skull Valley School District, as it is required to under law. It also takes students from the Yarnell Elementary School District.

Additionally it took high school students from the Walnut Grove Elementary School District, until that district dissolved in 2021.

== Schools ==
High school

- Prescott High School (Grades 9-12)

Middle schools

- Mile High Middle School (Grades 7-8)
- Granite Mountain Middle School (Grades 5-6)

Elementary schools (K-4)

- Taylor Hicks Elementary School
- Abia Judd Elementary School
- Lincoln Elementary School

Preschool

- Discovery Gardens Preschool
