= Congress Mine =

Inactive gold mine in Yavapai County, Arizona

Coordinates: 34°12′03″N 112°51′03″W

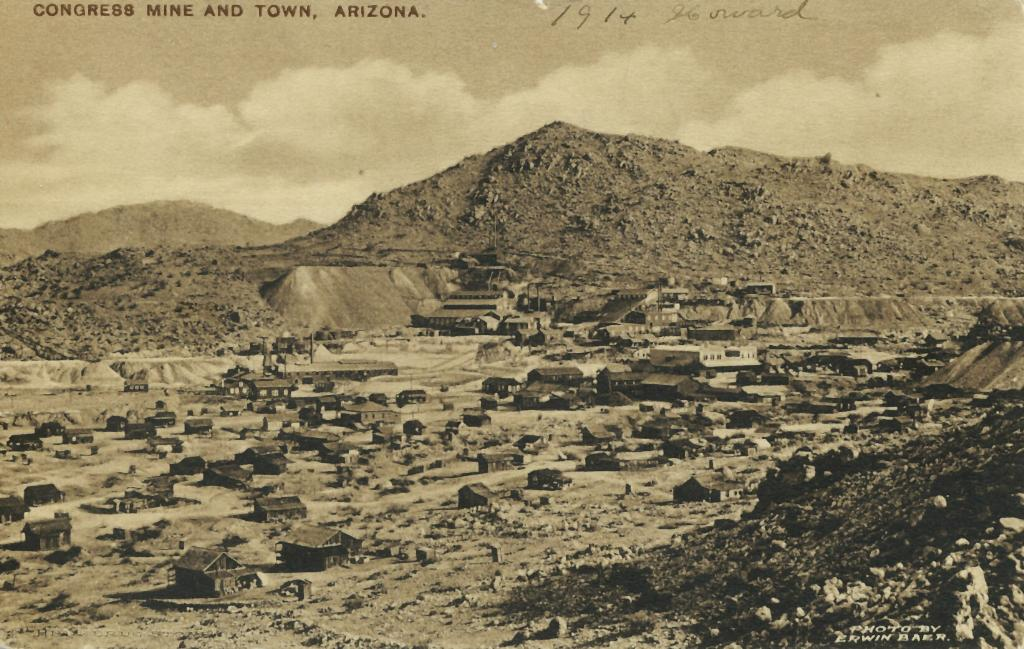
The town of Congress with the mine in the background, c. 1914

The Congress Mine is a gold mine located at the ghost town of Congress, Arizona, on the southeastern slope of the Date Creek Mountains, approximately 18 miles north-northeast of Wickenburg, Arizona, at an elevation of about 3,000 feet (Lat. 34.216 – Long. -122.841). The nearest community, four miles away, is modern Congress, formerly known as Congress Jct railroad station or Martinez Post Office. The Congress Mine produced substantial quantities of gold and was considered one of the most productive gold mines in Arizona.

The gold found in the mine was primarily small veins embedded in white quartz with inclusions of iron pyrite (fool's gold), iron, and sulfur. The Congress vein was considered a peculiar formation, characterized as "a dike of green stone trap." The ore ran through this dike and the dike was found throughout the entire geographical ledge. The most valuable ore-bearing rocks could be found lodged on or near a foot wall in the ledge usually in drifts 12 to 15 feet high. The vein had a dip of 22 degrees and was usually about 15 feet wide. The vein was accessed by shafts dug (often quite deep) into the areas around the ledge.

== History ==
Following the placer gold rush to the nearby Weaver district in 1863–34, prospectors began scouring the surrounding hills for gold lodes. In the 1860s miners organized the Date Creek Mining District (later renamed the Martinez district) after discovering gold in the Date Creek Mountains. One of the early prospectors was Dennis May, who would later discover the Congress Mine, but not until twenty years of sporadic, small scale operations in the immediate area. According to the Martinez Mining District records held by the Sharlot Hall Museum, Prescott, May first co-located a claim on the "Date Creek Lode" in 1870. By 1880, he was working what would become the Congress mine, staking with two prospector partners the Niagara claim June 26, 1880, followed by the adjacent Congress claim March 25, 1884. From Buffalo, New York, and in Arizona since 1866, May was a typical single-blanket prospector. In the early 1880s he was able to sell some other claims through mine promoter Frank Murphy, and began a more thorough working of the Congress group of claims. Here he found his bonanza.

May, again through promoter Frank Murphy, sold the Congress group in 1887 to Joseph "Diamond Jo" Reynolds for $30,000. Properly capitalized as the Congress Gold Company, a stamp mill was built and the mine opened. In 1891, while visiting his mine with Frank Murphy, the colorful Diamond Jo Reynolds died. Reynolds, childless, willed a part ownership of the mine to Murphy, who shut it down while promoting and building the railroad from Ash Fork on the Santa Fe mainline (across northern Arizona) to Phoenix via Prescott and via a point near the Congress mine. In 1894, with the railroad nearing completion of construction, Murphy and the Reynolds estate sold the Congress gold mine to a group of Tombstone mine owners (Tombstone's silver boom was bust). Headed by E.B. Gage, formerly superintendent of the Grand Central in Tombstone, the company relocated its miners and mill men to open the Congress. Financing came from the Grand Central backers, principally N.K. Fairbank of Chicago and Charles D. Arms and partners of Youngstown, Ohio. As superintendent they hired William F Staunton, formerly of the Tombstone M&M Co., who expanded operations, expanded the mill to 40 stamps, introduced the cyanide process, and turned the Congress into territorial Arizona's biggest gold producer.

In 1900, the number 1 shaft had reached a depth of 2,700 feet and was the deepest shaft in the Arizona Territory. The shafts generally ran at an angle of 22-22.5 degrees to follow the vein. In 1900, the mine consisted of about 30 separate claims of which the principle producers were the Congress, the Niagara and the Why Not, and had by then produced more than $5,000,000 (in 1900 dollars) worth of gold. Around this time the monthly payroll of the mine was reported to have about 400 miners.

In May 1901 the Congress Mine was visited by then President William McKinley on a tour of the country. The tour was orchestrated by Arizona Territorial Governor Nathan Oakes Murphy and brother Frank M. Murphy, who had re-acquired an interest in the Congress Mine. The tour helped promote Murphy's new company, the Development Company of America (DCA), which was organized to buy and develop properties. Murphy's DCA acquired the Congress, but retained the management of E.B. Gage and W.F. Staunton, both of whom later became prominent in the DCA. A week before president McKinley's visit, Staunton had completed the second 40 stamp mill and expanded the roasting and cyanide works. The Congress became the DCA's steady dividend producer.

In 1902, miners struck over reduction of pay, and over the right to organize a miners' union. The Western Federation of Miners had entered the district, with rumors of violence (the company's water pump was later dynamited by persons unknown). The company introduced low paid miners from Mexico. The strike failed, but territorial legislation was passed for an eight-hour work day.

In 1902, a competing syndicate from New York acquired a claim to property adjacent to the Congress Mine which was earlier ignored by the engineers of the Congress Gold Company as being devoid of precious minerals. This turned out to be a big oversight and the Senate Mine was developed. This caused great anxiety to the stockholders of the Congress Gold Mining Company and they began to acquire adjoining claims and nearby land. This proved to be a successful strategy as other gold veins were discovered.

More gold was discovered in previously ignored areas near the Congress Mine in 1902. Four more ore bearing ledges were discovered near the main (Congress) shaft which by this time had reached a depth of 3,200 feet. These ledges followed the same general geology as the previously discovered ore deposits running at an angle near 22 degrees.

The gold-bearing ore became scarcer the deeper the miners went and work underground diminished while the tailings were reprocessed. The owners of the mine then decided to prospect within the existing shafts for new veins of gold-bearing rocks. In 1905 a new offshoot vein was discovered at a level of 2,050 feet in the number 5 shaft. A horizontal shaft was dug to follow this vein. By this time the Congress Shaft had reached a depth of 4,000 feet with a few of the other shafts passing the 3,000 foot level. By 1906, with the discovery of new veins, the Congress Mine was again in full production. The ore near the 4,000 foot depth was reported to be richer than the veins at the lesser depths. At this time equipment included 12 hoists with steam engines ranging from 20 to 200 horsepower, a reduction plant with an 80 stamp mill, a new concentrating plant, a cyanide plant consisting of a roasting furnace and seven 90-ton leaching tanks and three 200-ton leaching tanks for non roasted ore.

In ensuring years, high-grade ores became harder to find and harder to get to and more work was done on the processing of tailings for the low-grade ores it contained. The Congress paid its last dividend in 1910 and company president Frank Murphy ordered the operation closed down. The Congress mine operated for the first three months of 1911 and then closed while the parent company which had concentrated on developing other properties, primarily at Tombstone (Tombstone Consolidated) and at Silver Bell copper district (Imperial Copper) ran into financial difficulties. The DCA, unable to pay its bonds, and its subsidiaries collapsed in 1911 with the Phelps Dodge and Guggenheims' ASARCO interests picking up the pieces. As the Congress played out, competing claims around it continued to be found and worked, though not to the same degree of success as the Congress Mine.

In 1912 the bankrupt Development Company of America (DCA) lost the Congress Mine but to the Frank M. Murphy interests. His attorney, T.G. Norris, began to sell off parts of the property including the rights to the mine dump and tailings, to other mining concerns. In 1913 the only activity at the mine was speculative, mostly centered on possible leases for reworking the tailings and dumps of discarded ore left over from the primary mining of the main shafts. It was reported that most of the machinery still stood at the site, looking as if it could start up again any time, "at the blowing of the whistle." The town of Congress, Arizona, was "hanging on" but with the majority of the mining activity stilled, a good number of residents (either miners or those associated with mining businesses) began moving to more active areas. Much of the news concerning the Congress Mine by this time began to shift focus from, "What is to come," to, "What once was." A few hopeful reports were printed from time to time that the Congress Mine would be re-opened. Sadly for the people of Congress, Arizona, these reports were erroneous and the most common reports were details of the equipment being removed from the mine complex to be utilized elsewhere. Also by this time, the mine was most commonly called the "Old Congress Mine," to distinguish it from other mines with the same name, particularly the re-opened Congress Mine near Silverton, Colorado. By 1914 the vast majority or reports concerning the Congress Mine centered on possible schemes to rework the tailings. No potential work within the mine itself was reported.

With Frank Murphy's death in 1917, any hope of reopening was gone. The estate sold the physical plant, mills, and mine railroad equipment shortly thereafter. As World War I progressed, references to the Old Congress Mine became almost non-existent and by the end of the war the only references to be found were in articles about news makers who were once associated with the Congress Mine. The heyday of one of the greatest gold mines in Arizona was over. A brief revival occurred with the rise of gold market values during the 1930s, when Frank Murphy's widow sold out her interest. The best history of the mine was published by family friend and former supt. Staunton in the Engineering & Mining Journal November 13, 1926.

=== Discovery and ownership ===
Successful mines have many fathers while a borrasca is an orphan. The Congress is no different. In 1903, a man named Ben Bartlett recounted on his death bed that he had discovered the Congress in the early 1870s. Some later sources say that Bartlett abandoned the mine, some say May and partner Edward Gilbert paid Bartlett $150 for the claim. Dennis May died in Phoenix on October 17, 1907. In his 1907 obituary, a later partner reportedly said May had re-staked an abandoned claim that became the Congress. Be that as it may, Dennis May was the first person to energetically develop the prospect into a small mine. The scale of production was minimal; May used a simple arrastra to work a few tons of ore. Later, May bought a farm near Buffalo, New York, but returned to prospect the Arizona desert, while Bartlett later became a laborer in the Congress mine. Ben Bartlett died February, 1903.

Frank Morrill Murphy, a Prescott, Arizona mining promoter, acted as a broker for the sale of the Congress mine to Joseph "Diamond Joe" Reynolds of Chicago. In 1887, their Congress Gold Company built a ten stamp mill (later expanded to twenty stamp mill) and produced $600,000 over the next four years. Frank Murphy, brother of Arizona Territorial Secretary (1889–90) and Governor (1890–1893, 1898–1902) Nathan Oakes Murphy, became a trusted friend of Joseph "Diamond Jo" Reynolds and was superintendent of the Congress mine after Mr. Reynolds purchased it. He was still the superintendent at the time of "Diamond Jo" Reynolds' death (he was at Mr. Reynolds' bedside at the mine when he died, and inherited a share of the property). Joseph "Diamond Jo" Reynolds died of pneumonia at the age of 71 on February 21, 1891, in his tent at the Congress Mine in Arizona. After his death, his estate was valued at between $8 and $10 million, completely debt free. His widow, Eleanor Morton Reynolds, became one of the executors of Joseph "Diamond Jo" Reynolds' estate and after his death she sold the mine in 1894 (they had no children heirs). Joseph "Diamond Jo" Reynolds had championed a railroad between Prescott and Phoenix, running through Congress, to reduce shipping costs to and from the mine. Immediately after his death, Frank Murphy concentrated on getting the railroad built and the Santa Fe, Prescott and Phoenix Railway reached Congress in 1894, then Phoenix in 1895.

A group from Tombstone took an option on the Congress in March 1894. They incorporated the Congress Gold Mining Company in 1895, and consummated the purchase of the mine from "Diamond Jo" Reynolds' estate. Since his death in 1891 the mine had been shut down. The principals in the new company when incorporated were C.D. Arms, Eliphalet Butler Gage, (a successful mine manager in Tombstone in the early days) as president, N.K. Fairbank, and Frank M. Murphy. The capital stock was valued at $1,000,000.

In 1900, it was reported that the Congress Mine had been sold again, this time to a syndicate headed by ex-Senator Warner Miller of New York for $3,000,000. This was later proven a false claim.

On April 5, 1901, the Congress Mine was sold to a syndicate headed by John William MacKay for $5,000,000. This was also false. Actually Frank Murphy and partners, Gage and partners, and others formed a holding company modeled after United States Steel Corporation. Called the Development Company of America, it acquired properties and developed them across the Southwest and northern Mexico. The DCA organized a subsidiary, the Congress Consolidated Mines Company, Limited, to acquire and manage its Congress holdings. Listed as the principal sellers were Frank M. Murphy, E.B. Gage and N.K. Fairbanks; not surprisingly, the buyers were Murphy, Gage, Fairbank et al. who made up the officers of the new corporation. At the time of the sale it was reported that the management would stay the same and that the former owners would retain some interest in the mine.

The Development Company of America with Frank Murphy as president, headquartered in New York City, also owned the Poland Mine Company, Imperial Copper Company (Silver Bell district west of Tucson), Tombstone Consolidated Mines Company of Tombstone, Arizona, vast timber lands in Chihuahua, the Christmas copper mines near Ray, a major smelter at SASCO to work the coppers ores of Silverbell/Imperial, and lesser properties. Under these subsidiaries were a number of mine railroads, mills, and undeveloped lands. At Congress they operated the mining railroad which ran 2 1/2 miles to the Congress Mine from Congress Junction, on Murphy and partner's Santa Fe, Prescott & Phoenix Railroad.

In 1912 the bankrupt Development Company of America sold the Imperial to a mining conglomerate headed up by the Guggenheim family; the Tombstone Con to the Phelps Dodge Corporation; and the Christmas, Congress, and other properties to the Murphy interests. After his death in 1917, his widow Ethel Meaney Murphy and the estate with the assistance of her attorney T.G. Norris divested themselves of the property by the mid-1930s.

== People associated with the mine ==
- Charles D. Arms: A member of the syndicate that purchased the Congress Mine from the estate of Joseph "Diamond Joe" Reynolds in 1894. He died in 1896 and his heirs continued active in the Congress and DCA. One of his daughter's homes is the Arms Family Museum of Local History in Youngstown, Ohio. He had previously made money in Ohio coal and iron, then speculated in Deadwood, Leadville, Tombstone and Aspen before the Congress.
- N. K. Fairbanks: Came into the Tombstone speculations of C D Arms and later with Murphy's railroad and mining investments, including the Congress. Chicago industrialist was one of the richest men of his time. Fairbank, Arizona, now a ghost town, named for him.
- Eliphalet Butler Gage: A prominent mine manager in early Tombstone, he had attracted Arms and Fairbank into the rich Grand Central mine. They followed him to Congress in 1894, and led in the 1901 reopening of the old Tombstone mines through their Tombstone Consolidated mining company, a DCA subsidiary. Resigned presidency of Congress, Tombstone and other DCA operating companies in 1909 and died 1913 in California.
- Edward F. Gilbert: According to a 1907 account, reportedly with Dennis May, rediscovered or purchased the Congress Mine in 1883 (but mining district records do not confirm this). Abandoned his share due to the evidently low grade of the surface ores. Died in Kingman in July 1907.
- Professor M. Goodloe: selected by Staunton to follow him as General Superintendent, Congress Mines, then up through the ranks of the DCA Company
- Ben Goodrich: General Counsel for the Development Company of America, parent company of the Congress Mines Company.
- Sam Gunn: Mine Foreman, Congress Mines Company
- John William MacKay: Head of the mining syndicate that reportedly bought the Congress Mine in 1901, but report false.
- Victor L. Mason: Vice President of the Development Company of America, parent company of the Congress Mines Company. Personal secretary of Secretary of War Russell Alger during the Spanish–American War, later Senator Alger, who was a major investor in the Murphy railroads and mines, including the Congress Con. Mason represented Alger's interests and also served as the assistant secretary of the Republican National Committee. Died in an early plane crash 1912.
- Frank Morrill Murphy: Brokered the sale of the mine from Dennis May, discoverer, to Joseph "Diamond Joe" Reynolds. Made superintendent by Mr. Reynolds; inherited a share of the mine upon Reynold's death 1891. The Congress helped Murphy become Arizona's first self-made millionaire. He would hold an interest in the mine until his death in 1917. Builder (1892–95)of the Santa Fe, Prescott and Phoenix Railway from Ash Fork through Prescott to Phoenix which served Congress, Arizona, and its many branches west to Parker and on into California, east to Ray, to Crown King and Poland, and shorter lines. Was principle organizer of the Development Company of America, which "acquired" the Congress in 1901. As president of DCA, 1901–1912, was CEO over Congress. He was also a back room political deal maker and the brother of Arizona Territorial Secretary and Governor Nathan Oakes Murphy. He died in Prescott, 1917, still owning the Congress.
- Joseph "Diamond Jo" Reynolds: Chicago businessman and Mississippi River steamboat man who purchased the mine from its discoverer, Dennis May. Mr. Reynolds died in 1891 while at the mine.
- W. F. Staunton: Graduate Columbia School of Mines. Successful supt of the Tombstone Mining & Milling Co, transferred to Congress in 1894 following the silver crash of 1893. Superintendent 1894–1901, when he was elevated under the DCA organization as general manager over its many interests, including the Congress Con. Later operated other mines in California and Arizona, notably the Verde Central at Jerome. Died in California 1947. His vast collection of papers, memoir, correspondence, etc. at the University of Arizona Special Collections provide an insider's view of the Congress mine, 1890s–1930s.

=== Mine-related deaths ===
- Alfred Jackson, Miner 12-21-1899
- A. L. White, Weather Observer 9-28-1896

== See also ==
- Sasco, Arizona
- Castle Hot Springs (Arizona)
