= Weaverville =

Weaverville may refer to a place in the United States:

- Weaverville, Arizona
- Weaverville, California
- Weaverville, North Carolina
