= Sasco (disambiguation) =

Sasco is a ghost town in Arizona, U.S.

Sasco or SASCO may also refer to

- Sakhalin Shipping Company
- South African Students Congress
- Sasco Brook, a brook dividing the Southport neighborhood of Fairfield and the Greens Farms neighborhood of Westport, both in Connecticut
- Saudi Automotive Services Company
