= Yavapai County Sheriff's Office =

Law enforcement agency in Arizona

- Abbreviation: YCSO

Agency overview
- Formed: 1864

Jurisdictional structure
- Operations jurisdiction: Yavapai County, Arizona, USA
- Map of Yavapai County Sheriff's Office's jurisdiction
- Area: 8,128 square miles (21,050 km^{2})
- Population: 212,635 (2007)
- General nature: Local civilian police

Operational structure
- Headquarters: Prescott, Arizona
- Agency executive: David Rhodes, Sheriff

Website
- http://www.ycsoaz.gov

The Yavapai County Sheriff's Office (YCSO) is a local law enforcement agency that serves Yavapai County, Arizona. It provides general-service law enforcement to unincorporated areas of Yavapai County, serving as the equivalent of the police for unincorporated areas of the county. It also operates the county jail system. The Yavapai County Sheriff's Office (YCSO) is headquartered in Prescott, Arizona.

== Organization ==
The current Sheriff is David Rhodes. The YCSO has three divisions:

- Law Enforcement Services Division
  - Northern Area Command
  - Eastern Area Command
  - Southeast Area Command
  - Southwest Area Command
  - Criminal Investigations Bureau
  - Support Services Bureau
- Detention Services Division
  - Administrative Services
  - Central ID Services
  - Housing Services
  - Inmate Services
  - Transportation Services
  - Medical Services
- Administrative Services Division
  - Records
  - Communications / Dispatch
  - Information Technology

== Sheriffs ==
#	Portrait	Name	Term in office	Length of service	Party affiliation	Previous office
1	No image available	Van Ness Cummings Smith (1837–1914; aged 77)	May 26, 1864 – February 18, 1865	268 days	Democratic	
2	No image available	Jerome Calkins (1830–?)	February 18, 1865 – January 24, 1866	340 days	Republican	
3	No image available	John T. Bourke ^{1} (1827–1868; aged 41)	January 24, 1866 – June 30, 1867	1 year, 157 days		
4	No image available	Andrew J. Moore ^{2} (d. 1885)	July 1, 1867 – January 21, 1868	204 days		
5	No image available	John L. Taylor ^{1}	January 21, 1868 – December 31, 1870	2 years, 344 days		
6		John H. Behan ^{1} (1844–1912; aged 67)	January 1, 1871 – December 31, 1872	2 years		
7	No image available	James S. Thomas ^{3}	January 1, 1873 – January 5, 1874	1 year		
8	No image available	Henry M. Herbert ^{1} (d. 1895)	January 17, 1874 – December 31, 1874	1 year		
9	No image available	Edward F. Bowers (1838–1879; aged 40)	January 1, 1875 – December 31, 1878	4 years		
10	Sheriff John R. Walker	John R. Walker (1832–1897; aged 64)	January 1, 1879 – December 31, 1882	4 years		
11	No image available	Jacob Henkle	January 1, 1883 – December 31, 1884	2 years		
12	William J. Mulvenon	William J. Mulvenon (1853–1915; aged 61)	January 1, 1885 – December 31, 1888	4 years		
13		William "Bucky" O'Neill (1860–1898; aged 38)	January 1, 1889 – December 31, 1890	2 years		
14	No image available	James R. Lowry (1850–1918; aged 67–68)	January 1, 1891 – December 31, 1894	4 years		
15	No image available	George C. Ruffner (1862–1933; aged 70)	January 1, 1895 – December 31, 1898	4 years	Democrat	
16	No image available	John L. Munds (1868–1953; aged 84)	January 1, 1899 – December 31, 1902	4 years	Democrat	
17	No image available	Joseph I. Roberts (1865–1925; aged 60)	January 1, 1903 – December 31, 1904	2 years	Republican	
18	No image available	James R. Lowry (2nd term)	January 1, 1905 – December 31, 1908	4 years		
19	No image available	James W. Smith	January 1, 1909 – December 31, 1911	3 years		
20	No image available	Charles C. Keeler (1859–?)	January 1, 1912 – December 31, 1914	3 years	Republican	
21	No image available	Joseph F. Young (1871–1941; aged 70)	January 1, 1915 – December 31, 1918	4 years	Democrat	
22	No image available	Warren G. Davis † (1875–1922; aged 46)	January 1, 1919 – September 5, 1922	3 years, 247 days	Republican	
23	No image available	Joseph P. Dillon ^{1} (1864–1933; aged 69)	September 6, 1922 – December 31, 1922	116 days		
24	No image available	George C. Ruffner (2nd Term)	January 1, 1923 – December 31, 1924	2 years	Democrat	
25	No image available	Edwin G. Weil (1870–1935; aged 64)	January 1, 1925 – December 31, 1926	2 years	Republican	
26.	No image available	George C. Ruffner (3rd Term) †	January 1, 1927 – July 23, 1933	6 years, 203 days	Democrat	
27	No image available	Robert M. Robbins ^{1} (1882–1957; aged 74)	July 29, 1933 – December 31, 1940	7 years, 155 days	Republican	
28.	No image available	Willis Butler (1910–1948; aged 38)	January 1, 1941 – December 31, 1946	6 years	Democrat	
29	No image available	Orville D. Bozarth (1886–1976; aged 89)	January 1, 1947 – December 31, 1954	8 years	Democrat	
30.	No image available	James G. Cramer (1914–1992; aged 78)	January 1, 1955 – December 31, 1962	8 years	Democrat	
31	No image available	G.A. "Al" Ayars ^{2} (1921–2007; aged 86)	January 1, 1963 – August 31, 1974	11 years, 242 days	Republican	
32	No image available	Robert H. Scott ^{1} (1931–2015; aged 84)	September 1, 1974 – December 31, 1976	2 years, 121 days	Republican	
33	No image available	Harold "Curly" Moore (1928–2015; aged 86)	January 1, 1977 – December 31, 1988	12 years	Republican	
34	No image available	G.C. "Buck" Buchanan (1942–2019; aged 77)	January 1, 1989 – December 31, 2004	16 years	Republican	
35	No image available	Roy "Steve" Waugh ^{2} (born in 1945; aged 75)	January 1, 2005 – June 2, 2011	6 years, 152 days	Republican	
36	No image available	Scott Mascher (born in 1961; aged 59)	June 3, 2011 – December 31, 2020	9 years, 209 days	Republican	
37	No image available	David Rhodes	January 1, 2021 – Incumbent		Republican	

Notes

1. Appointed
2. Resigned
3. Abandoned

† died in office

== Fallen officers ==
Since the establishment of the Yavapai County Sheriff's Office, eight officers have died in the line of duty.

== See also ==
- List of law enforcement agencies in Arizona
- Little Miss Nobody case
