= Anne Tolstoi Wallach =

American advertising executive and author (1929–2018)

- Born: Anne Tolstoi; February 19, 1929; Manhattan, New York, U.S.
- Died: June 27, 2018 (aged 89); Manhattan, New York, U.S.
- Education: Radcliffe College

Anne Tolstoi Wallach (February 19, 1929 – June 27, 2018) was an American advertising executive and author. Following her graduation from the Dalton School and Radcliffe College, she began working for the advertising agency J. Walter Thompson as a copy editor, and later a vice president and creative director. She worked as a vice president and creative supervisor for Grey Advertising and as a vice president for Cunningham & Walsh Inc.

Her debut novel, Women's Work, focused on a female advertising executive and received an uncommonly large advance of $850,000 in 1981 (equivalent to $3.01 million in 2025). Wallach wrote a nonfiction book, Paper Dolls — How to Find, Recognize, Buy, Collect and Sell the Cutouts of Two Centuries (1982), and two subsequent novels, Private Scores (1988) and Trials (1996).

== Early life ==
Wallach was born Anne Tolstoi on February 19, 1929, in Manhattan, New York. Her parents were Cecile (née Voice), a homemaker, and Edward Tolstoi, a Russian immigrant and physician who specialized in diabetes at Cornell Medical College. Her mother had schizophrenia and was hospitalized throughout Wallach's childhood. She was close to her father, who encouraged her to read and to attend cultural events with him as a child. She attended the Dalton School, graduating in 1945. She attended Radcliffe College, where she edited the literary magazine and aspired to be Edna St. Vincent Millay, sending copious poems to The New Yorker throughout her time as an undergraduate. She graduated cum laude with a bachelor's degree in English in 1949. While at college, she met her first two future husbands at The Harvard Crimson.

== Career ==
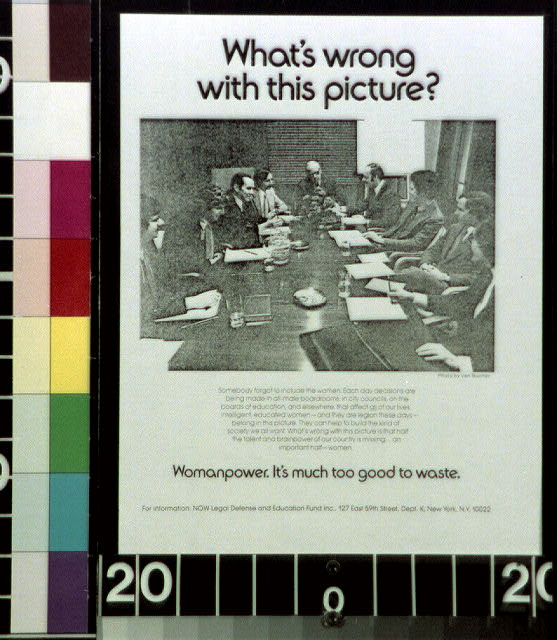
"Womanpower: It's much too good to waste", a campaign Wallach created for the National Organization for Women

Following graduation, Wallach began working for the advertising agency J. Walter Thompson as a typist on the basis of her secretarial experience and, after winning a competition, became a junior copy editor in the women's group. Established by a female vice president at the company, the women's group was created due to a belief that only women could advertise to other women. She took time out from the company, including working for Ogilvy between 1951 and 1952, and returned as an editorial writer in 1959. Wallach rose through the ranks, becoming a vice president and later the creative director at a time when it was the largest agency in the world. While at the company, she worked for the Ford Thunderbird, the first woman to work on the Ford account.

Wallach – described as a "staunch feminist" – was frustrated by advertisers' attitudes towards women. In 1971, she wrote an article for The New York Times about the "ad lib" movement, which applied the women's liberation movement to the advertising industry. That same year, she wrote an editorial titled "Is That Really Me? Today's Woman Has a Tough Time Recognizing Herself in Those TV Commercials" for TV Guide and an article for Advertising Age on the same subject the next year.

In 1973, Wallach worked on a campaign for the National Organization for Women's Legal Defense and Education Fund, which ran under the slogan "Womanpower: It's much too good to waste". Wallach worked with Midge Kovacs, an ad executive and the campaign coordinator, to create a series of advertisements, which ran nationally on television, radio and print, including CBS, Newsday, Business Week and in the women's magazines Ms. and Mademoiselle. One of the advertisements used an image of Wallach's Radcliffe diploma over the headline "Congratulations. You just spent twelve thousand dollars so she could join the typing pool".

Wallach left Thompson after fourteen years to become a vice president and creative supervisor for Grey Advertising, where she worked until 1975. She later joined Cunningham & Walsh Inc. as a vice president, where she was working in 1976. During her career, she worked on campaigns for brands such as Playtex and Aquafresh.

=== Literary career ===
In 1981, Wallach published her debut novel, Women's Work, which received a $850,000 advance (equivalent to $3.01 million in 2025) from the publishing company New American Library (NAL). The amount was considered a record for a debut novelist. The novel was about a female advertising executive who, frustrated by earning less than her male coworkers, decides to start her own marketing agency. Wallach said in interviews that the story was inspired by her own experiences as a woman in the advertising industry, telling The Boston Globe that, "the only thing I haven't done is tell off the board of directors." It was publicised in the Literary Guild and Doubleday Book Clubs and was one of the NAL's biggest fiction books of fall 1981, receiving the largest advertising campaign for a debut novel in the publisher's history. Following publication, Women's Work received mixed reviews from critics, including a starred review from Kirkus Reviews, but was not the commercial hit that was expected, spending only two weeks on the best-seller list. It was criticized by a review in The New York Times for the emotional protagonist, Domina Drexler.

Despite critical backlash, Wallach was able to use the publicity around Women's Work to draw focus to workplace issues, including the lack of maternity leave, and to publish the 1982 nonfiction book Paper Dolls — How to Find, Recognize, Buy, Collect and Sell the Cutouts of Two Centuries, based on her own collection of 3,000 dolls. Published by Van Nostrand Reinhold, it covered the history of paper dolls. Wallach began collecting the dolls as a child and built a wide collection of dolls, including dolls from the 18th century, which appear throughout the book. To research Paper Dolls, she travelled to museums and read mimeographs as there was little written about the subject.

Wallach left her career in advertising to continue writing, publishing the novels Private Scores in 1988 and Trials in 1996. The first novel focused on a casting director whose daughter is expelled from a prestigious private school in order to cover up the fact that she is being sexually assaulted. It received mixed reviews from The New York Times, which praised the timely nature of the topic but described the story as sensationalized. Her novel Trials was about a judge who is deciding the custody of a six-year-old girl following her father's death, which is contested by her father's gay lover and the child's aunt. The story discusses child abuse, AIDS and racism. The novel received a mixed review from Library Journal, which described it as a typical romance which suffers from gender and ethnic stereotyping. She also wrote articles for Harper's Bazaar.

== Personal life ==
Wallach married her first husband, Ronald M. Foster Jr., an employee benefits consultant, when she was 21. The couple had three children, Thomas, Alison and Alexander, and divorced in 1972. In 1959, she won a jingle contest sponsored by The Saturday Evening Post, with the prize being a ghost town in Arizona named Ulcer Gulch, which was renamed Foster's Ulcer Gulch. She married Richard W. Wallach, a state appellate judge, in 1976, a marriage which lasted until his death in 2003. She married Gerald Edward Maslon, a lawyer, in 2003, when she was 80 and he was 84. Maslon died in 2013.

== Death and legacy ==
Wallach died on June 27, 2018, at her home in Manhattan, due to complications from Parkinson's disease. She was 89. Her papers are held by the Schlesinger Library at the Radcliffe Institute for Advanced Study.

== Works ==
- Wallach, Anne Tolstoi (1981). Women's Work. New American Library.
- Wallach, Anne Tolstoi (1982). Paper Dolls — How to Find, Recognize, Buy, Collect and Sell the Cutouts of Two Centuries. Van Nostrand Reinhold.
- Wallach, Anne Tolstoi (1986). Private Scores. New American Library.
- Wallach, Anne Tolstoi (1996). Trials. Dutton.
