= Little Miss Nobody =

Little Miss Nobody may refer to:

== Entertainment ==
- Little Miss Nobody: A New Musical Comedy, an 1899 work by Harry Graham with music by Arthur E. Godfrey and Landon Ronald
- Little Miss Nobody (1916 film), a film featuring Harold Goodwin
- Little Miss Nobody (1917 film), a film directed by Harry F. Millarde
- Little Miss Nobody (1923 film), a film directed by Wilfrid Noy
- Little Miss Nobody (1933 film), a film starring Sebastian Shaw
- Little Miss Nobody (1936 film), a film starring Jane Withers

== People ==
- Little Miss Nobody case, a previously unidentified child murder victim
- Murder of Karen Price, a previously unidentified Welsh murder victim
