= Congress, Arizona =

CDP in Yavapai County, Arizona

- CDP
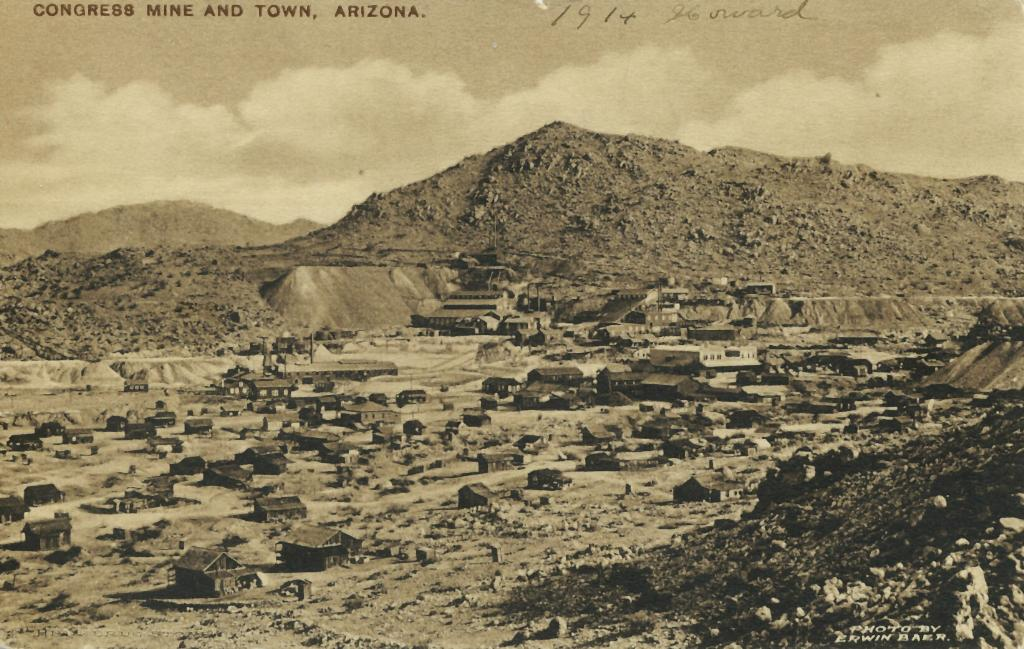
- View of Congress and the mine, c.1914.

- Location in Yavapai County and the state of Arizona

- Location in the United States
- Coordinates: 34°09′10″N 112°53′05″W
- Country: United States
- State: Arizona
- County: Yavapai

Area
  - Total: 37.77 sq mi (97.83 km^{2})
  - Land: 37.74 sq mi (97.74 km^{2})
  - Water: 0.035 sq mi (0.09 km^{2})
- Elevation: 3,002 ft (915 m)

Population (2020)
  - Total: 1,811
  - Density: 48.0/sq mi (18.53/km^{2})
- Time zone: UTC-7 (MST)
- ZIP code: 85332
- Area code: 928
- FIPS code: 04-15220
- GNIS feature ID: 2407653

Congress (aka Old Congress) is a census-designated place (CDP) in Yavapai County, Arizona, United States. Once a gold-mining center for the Congress Mine and then a ghost town, Congress serves as a retirement and bedroom community for nearby Wickenburg. The population was 1,811 at the 2020 census.

== History ==
Gold was discovered at the Congress Mine in 1884. By 1893, the Santa Fe, Prescott and Phoenix Railway passed within three miles of the mine, at Congress Junction. Congress boomed, and remained prosperous until the mid-1930s, when the mines closed. Total gold production at the Congress Mine exceeded $8 million at a production price of $20.67 per ounce – or about $400 million, at the 2007 price.

The post office moved to Congress Junction in 1938, where it remains. The community known as Congress is the old Congress Junction. Little remains at the original mining-camp townsite. The old Congress Cemetery is nearby.

== Geography ==
According to the United States Census Bureau, the CDP has a total area of 37.7 square miles (98 km^{2}), of which 37.6 square miles (97 km^{2}) is land and 0.04 square miles (0.10 km^{2}) (0.08%) is water.

=== Climate ===
According to the Köppen Climate Classification system, Congress has a semi-arid climate, abbreviated "BSk" on climate maps.

== Demographics ==
Historical population
Census	Pop.	Note	%±
2020	1,811		—
U.S. Decennial Census

=== 2020 census ===
As of the 2020 census, Congress had a population of 1,811. The population density was 47.9 per square mile. There were 1,166 housing units at an average density of 30.9 per square mile.

The median age was 66.2 years. 8.7% of residents were under the age of 18 and 53.5% of residents were 65 years of age or older. For every 100 females there were 103.3 males, and for every 100 females age 18 and over there were 106.6 males age 18 and over.

0.0% of residents lived in urban areas, while 100.0% lived in rural areas.

There were 908 households in Congress, of which 7.5% had children under the age of 18 living in them. Of all households, 56.6% were married-couple households, 15.7% were households with a male householder and no spouse or partner present, and 21.7% were households with a female householder and no spouse or partner present. About 30.1% of all households were made up of individuals and 19.6% had someone living alone who was 65 years of age or older. The average household size was 2.09 and the average family size was 2.57.

Of all housing units, 22.1% were vacant. The homeowner vacancy rate was 2.6% and the rental vacancy rate was 9.3%.

Racial composition as of the 2020 census
Race	Number	Percent
White	1,571	86.7%
Black or African American	11	0.6%
American Indian and Alaska Native	26	1.4%
Asian	13	0.7%
Native Hawaiian and Other Pacific Islander	1	0.1%
Some other race	69	3.8%
Two or more races	120	6.6%
Hispanic or Latino (of any race)	170	9.4%

=== Income and poverty ===
The median household income was $48,080 and the median family income was $57,675. About 9.8% of the population were below the poverty line, including 19.4% of those under age 18 and 6.4% of those age 65 or over. The employment rate was 24.4%, and 12.7% of residents had a bachelor's degree or higher.

== Education ==
Congress Elementary School District operates a local K-8 school. The district sends high school students to Wickenburg High School of the Wickenburg Unified School District. Students attended Wickenburg USD for all grade levels prior to 2001, when the Congress K-8 facility opened.

== Government and infrastructure ==
The Congress Post Office, of the United States Postal Service, opened in 2001.

== Gallery ==
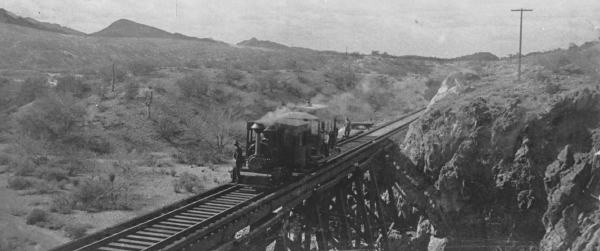
Porter locomotive #873, in service near Congress in the early 1900s.

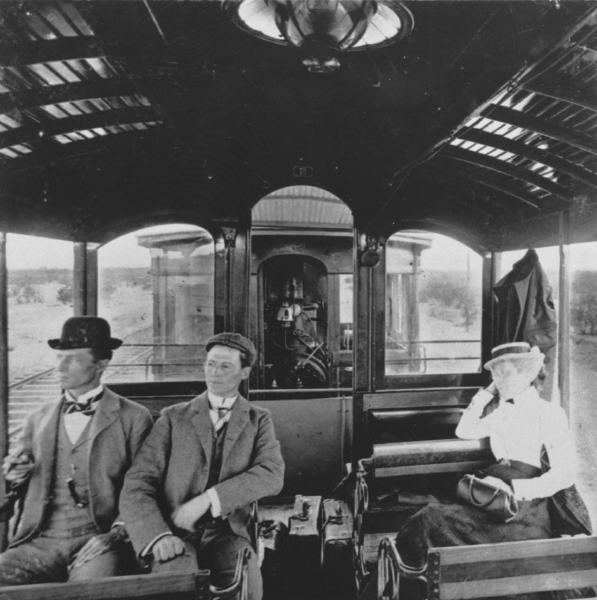
Congress residents on an excursion to Phoenix, c. 1905.

== See also ==
- Date Creek Mountains
- Stanton, Arizona
- Little Miss Nobody case – Sharon Lee Gallegos (1955–1960) whose murdered body was found in Congress
