= Picacho Peak State Park =

Protected area in Arizona

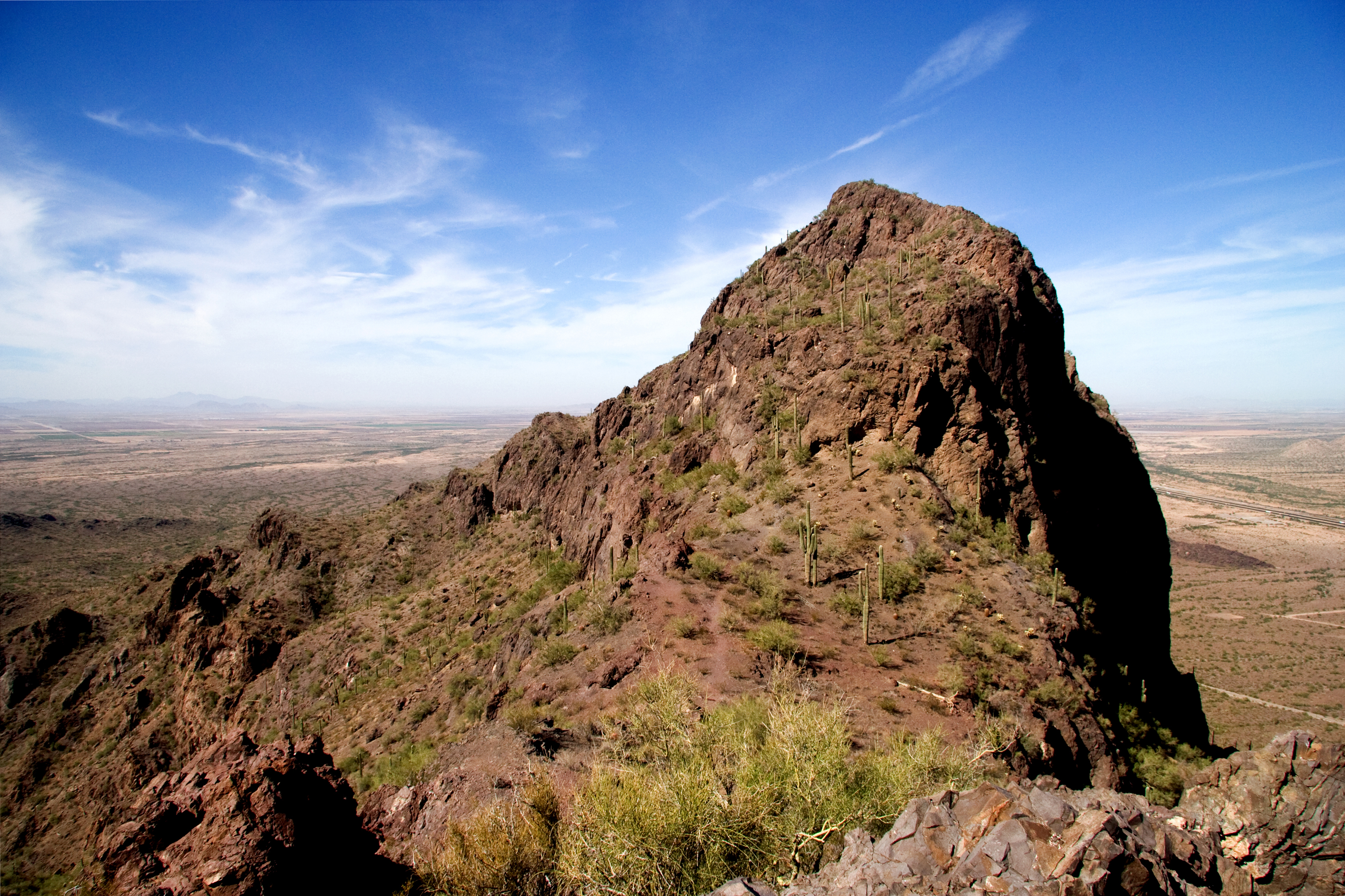

- Location within Arizona Location within the United States
- Interactive map of Picacho Peak State Park
- Location: Pinal County, Arizona, United States
- Coordinates: 32°38′45″N 111°24′04″W
- Area: 3,747 acres (1,516 ha)
- Elevation: 2,000 ft (610 m)
- Established: 1965
- Administrator: Arizona State Parks & Trails
- Visitors: 85,920 (in 2024)
- Website: Official website
- Picacho Pass Skirmish Site--Overland Mail Co. Stage Station at Picacho Pass
- U.S. National Register of Historic Places
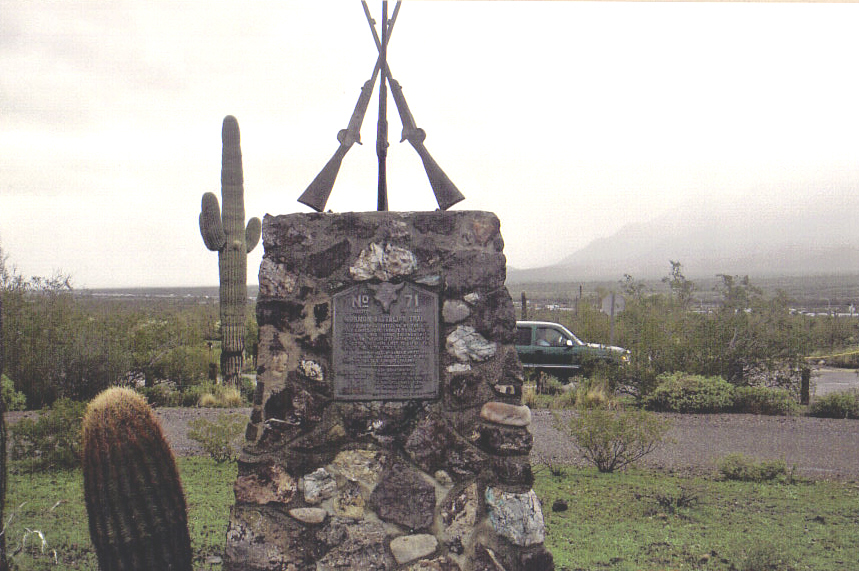
- Battle of Picacho Pass Monument
- Nearest city: Tucson, Arizona
- Area: 774 acres (313 ha)
- Built: 1858
- NRHP reference No.: 02001384
- Added to NRHP: November 22, 2002

Picacho Peak State Park is a state park surrounding Picacho Peak in Picacho, Arizona. The park is located between Casa Grande and Tucson near Interstate 10 in Pinal County. Its centerpiece spire is visible from downtown Tucson, a distance of 45 miles (72 km). The summit rises to 3,374 feet (1,028 m) above mean sea level. Though appearing to be the remnant of a volcanic neck, it is now believed to be a tilted and eroded piece of rock overlain by a lava flow.

== Name ==
The place name Picacho Peak is etymologically redundant: picacho means 'peak' in Spanish. In 1775 the peak was referred to as Cerro de Taca 'Taca Hill' by Father Francisco Garcés, using the Oʼodham name Tcacca or Taceo. It was also called Picacho del Tucson 'Tucson Peak' in the past.

== Description ==
The park is celebrated for wildflowers that appear mid-February to early April following good winter rain. Though set next to an interstate highway, the park's west face possesses an unspoiled Sonoran Desert setting. A small flat space on top of the spire can be reached via two trail heads. Portions of the trails are precarious, and hikers are aided by cables and catwalks. These additions make the routes some of the few via ferrata in the United States. From the top, there is a view south to the Santa Catalina Mountains near Tucson, east across Interstate 10 to Newman Peak, northwest to Tabletop Mountain near Casa Grande, north to the many mountain ranges surrounding Phoenix, and west to where the north-running Santa Cruz River runs underground supporting farms in a quaint desert valley.

== History ==
The Butterfield Overland Mail route had a stop near Picacho Peak. The park is near the site of the Battle of Picacho Pass, one of several American Civil War era engagements to occur in Arizona Territory. A Union cavalry patrol from California skirmished with Confederate scouts from Texas, and three men were killed. This marks the second westernmost battle of the American Civil War. Every year during early March, there are reenactments of the battle and other demonstrations of Civil War military history.

== Appearances in fiction ==
Picacho Peak features prominently in the novel The Host by Stephenie Meyer, serving as a guide to the main character in the first act of the story. Much of the action of the novel takes place in or near the state park.

Picacho Peak is a location in the hybrid animated feature film “Quantum Cowboys” (directed by Geoff Marslett). Some of the film’s action takes place near there and the three protagonists (played by Lily Gladstone, Kiowa Gordon and John Way) first get to know each other there. They are later attacked by marauders (David Arquette and Frank Mosley) near the base of the mountain.

== Plane crash ==
On June 8, 2024, a plane crashed near the summit of Picacho Peak, killing its pilot, 68-year-old James Galvin of Oro Valley.

== Gallery ==
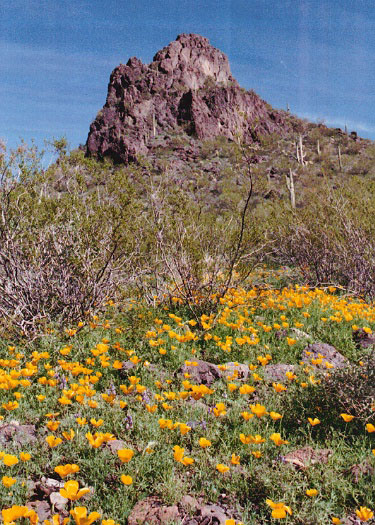
Spring wildflowers at Picacho Peak.

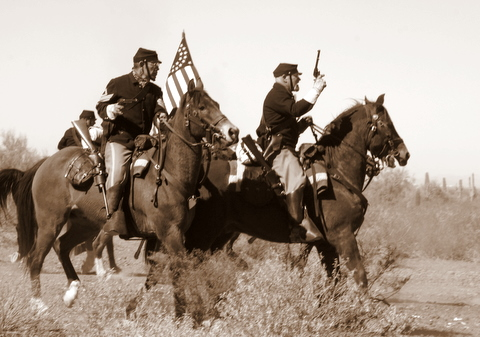
Re-enactment of the Battle of Picacho Peak in March 2007.

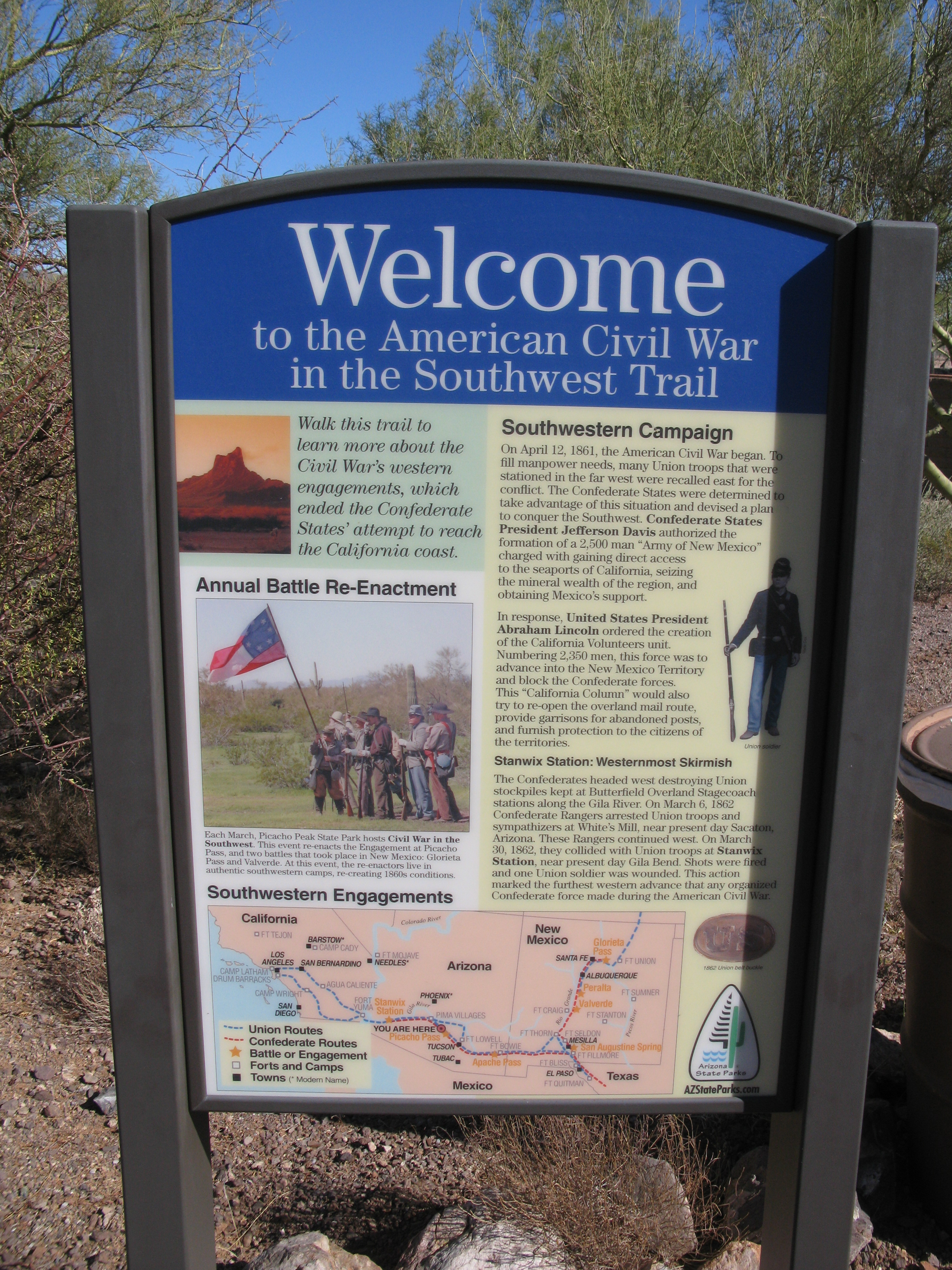

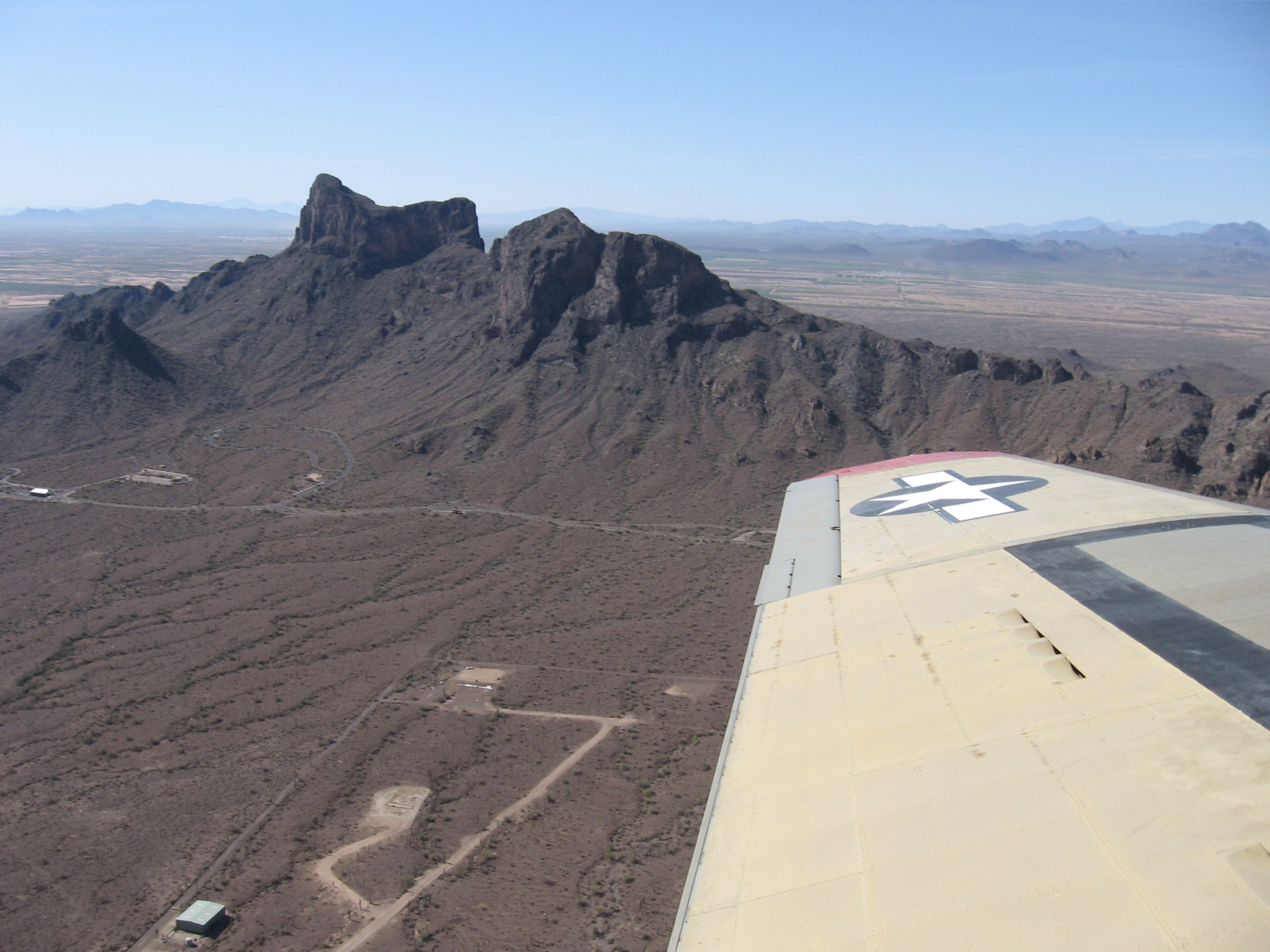
Aerial view of Picacho Peak taken from a Boeing B-17 Flying Fortress on April 20, 2013.

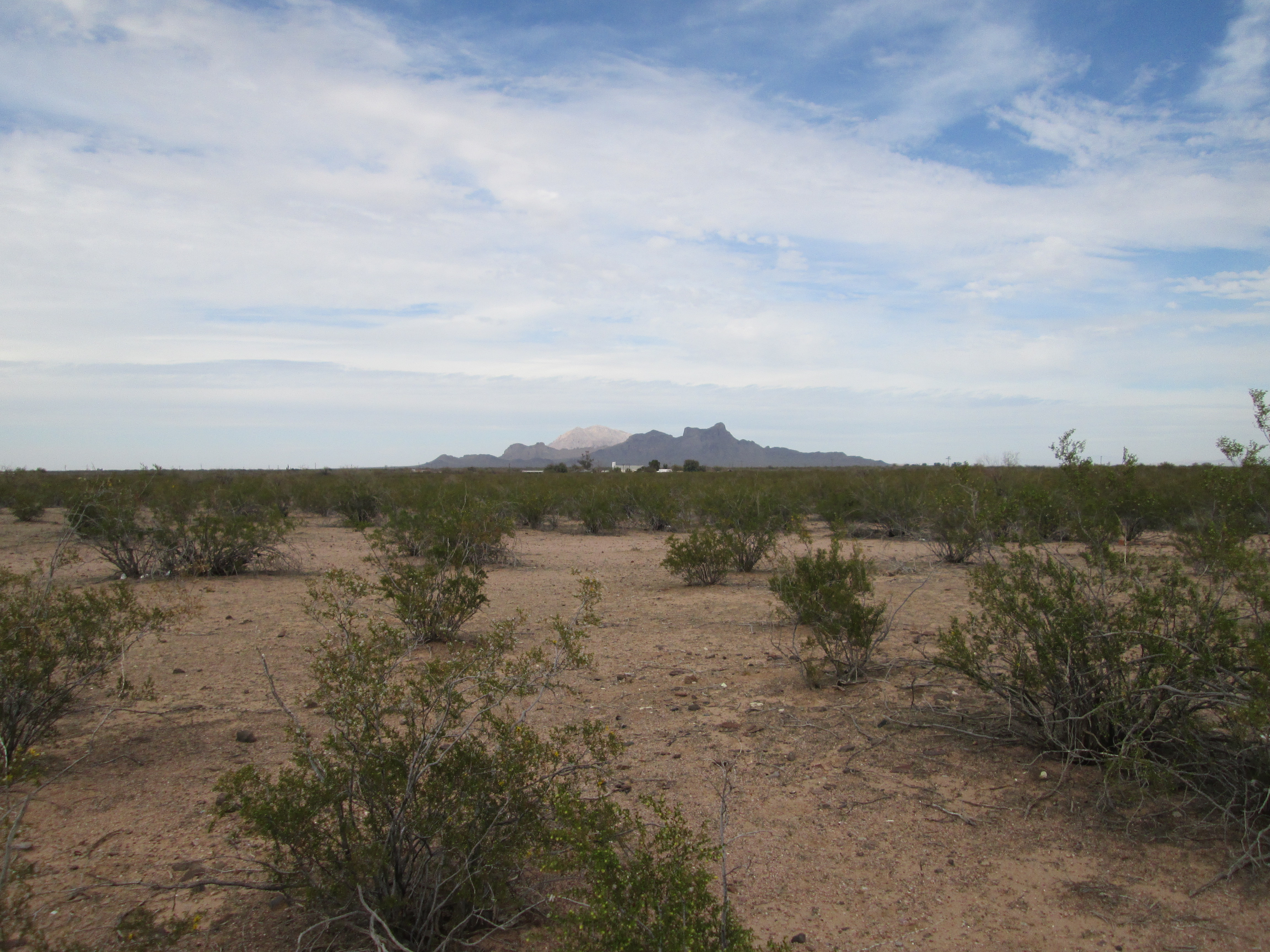
Picacho Peak from the ghost town of Sasco.

== See also ==
- Red Rock, Pinal County, Arizona
- Sasco, Arizona
