= Edward Tolstoi =

Russian-born American physician

- Born: 1897; Russian Empire
- Died: May 22, 1983 (aged 86)
- Education: Yale University; Cornell Medical College
- Occupation: Physician

Edward Tolstoi (1897–1983) was a physician who specialized in treating patients with diabetes. He was well known for authoring several books on diabetes care that espoused the free diet approach.

== Early life ==
Tolstoi was born in Russia and immigrated to the US when he was two years old. He was a 1919 graduate of Yale University. He went on to earn a medical degree from Cornell Medical College in 1923. He was later affiliated with Cornell Medical College and New York Hospital.

== Career ==
From the 1930s through the 1970s a controversy raged among diabetes caregivers. The free diet approach to diabetes care downplayed the importance of controlling blood glucose levels and emphasized preserving the lifestyle of the patient. The alternative, tight control, emphasized the importance of maintaining blood glucose levels within the normal range. Edward Tolstoi and Elliott P. Joslin were the two main authorities representing the two viewpoints. The two held a memorable in person debate in 1951 at the New York Academy of Medicine. The controversy was ultimately decided in favor of tight control when the results of the Diabetes Control and Complications Trial were published in 1993.

== Personal life ==
Tolstoi was married to Cecile Voice and had a daughter, Anne Tolstoi Wallach.

He died in Manhattan on May 22, 1983.
