= Oakes Murphy =

American politician (1849–1908)

Nathan Oakes Murphy
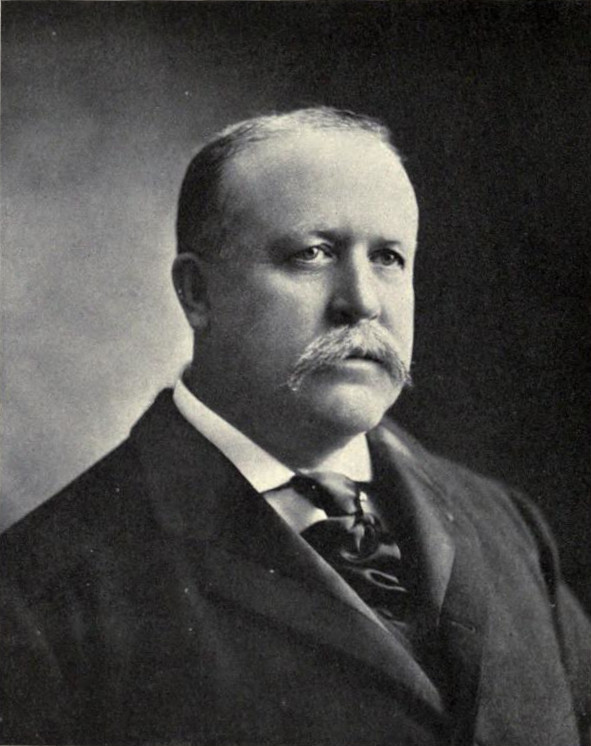

10th and 14th Governor of Arizona Territory
- In office August 1, 1898 – July 1, 1902
- Appointed by: William McKinley
- Preceded by: Myron H. McCord
- Succeeded by: Alexander Oswald Brodie
- In office May 11, 1892 – April 12, 1893
- Appointed by: Benjamin Harrison
- Preceded by: John N. Irwin
- Succeeded by: Louis Cameron Hughes

Delegate to the U.S. House of Representatives from Arizona Territory
- In office March 4, 1895 – March 3, 1897
- Preceded by: Marcus A. Smith
- Succeeded by: Marcus A. Smith

Personal details
- Born: October 14, 1849 Jefferson, Maine, U.S.
- Died: August 22, 1908 (aged 58) Coronado, California, U.S.
- Resting place: Rock Creek Cemetery; Washington, D.C., U.S.
- Party: Republican
- Spouses: Sarah E. Banghart (m. 1884; div. 1903) Emma D. Sells (m. 1904)

Nathan Oakes Murphy (October 14, 1849 – August 22, 1908) was the tenth and fourteenth Governor of Arizona Territory. As well as the territory's delegate to the House of Representatives.

Born in Jefferson, Maine, to Benjamin F. Murphy and Lucy Oakes Murphy. He attended the public schools. In 1856 the family moved to Wisconsin. From 1866 to 1869 he taught school in Wisconsin. He went to the western frontier and finally settled in Prescott, Arizona, in April 1883 where he engaged in mining and the real estate business. Secretary to the Governor of Arizona Territory in 1885. He was appointed secretary of Arizona Territory March 21, 1889. He served as delegate to the Republican National Convention in 1892. Governor of Arizona Territory 1892–1894.

Murphy was elected as a Republican to the Fifty-fourth Congress (March 4, 1895 – March 3, 1897). He was not a candidate for renomination in 1896. Again Governor of Arizona Territory and served from 1898 to 1902, when he resigned. He was an unsuccessful Republican candidate for election in 1900 to the Fifty-seventh Congress. He died in Coronado, California, August 22, 1908. He was interred in the Masonic Cemetery, San Diego, California but reinterred at Rock Creek Cemetery, Washington, D.C. in December 1909.

== Policies as governor ==
He supported the Mormon settlers in Arizona. He was an advocate for the statehood of Arizona. His efforts to make Arizona a more legitimate state included a territorial library in Phoenix, increasing mining operations, and a museum at the University of Arizona. He wanted the reduction on Indian reservations in Arizona. He also wanted the Prohibition of armed Indians.

== Frank Morrell Murphy ==
Oakes's brother, Frank was the owner of the Congress Mine, the Sasco smelter, and the builder of Castle Hot Springs. He also worked on what is now the Santa Fe Railroad, in northern Arizona.

U.S. House of Representatives
Preceded by Marcus A. Smith	Delegate to the U.S. House of Representatives from Arizona Territory; 1895–1897	Succeeded by Marcus A. Smith
