= Castle Hot Springs (Arizona) =

Thermal springs in Arizona, US

Coordinates: 33.98275°N 112.3619°W

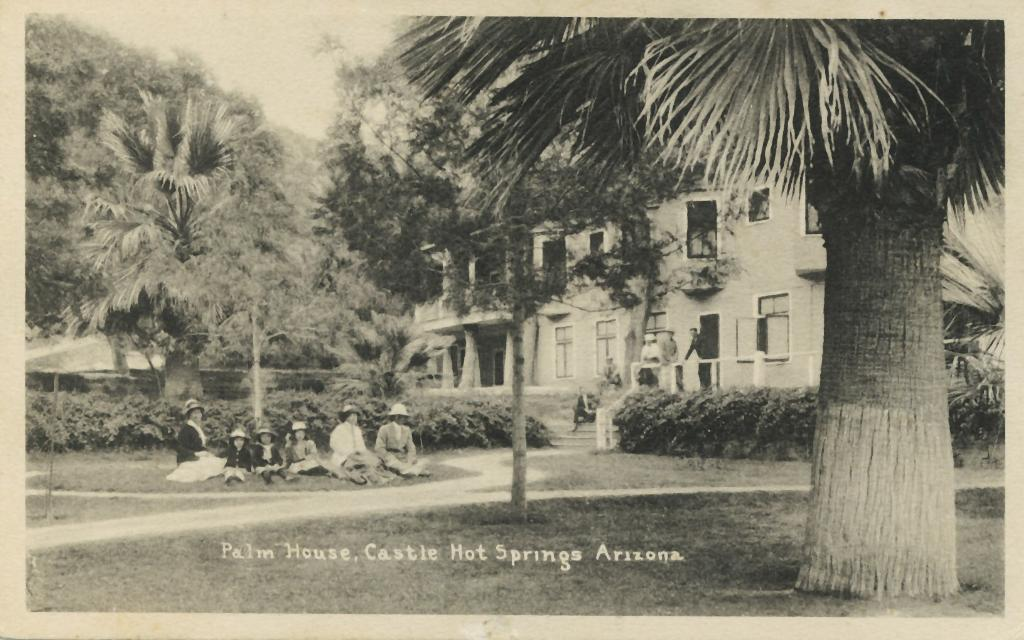
- Visitors next to the Palm House at Castle Hot Springs, Arizona, in 1908
- Interactive map of the Castle Hot Springs area
- Hotel chain: Relais & Châteaux

Website
- www.castlehotsprings.com

Castle Hot Springs is a restored historic resort in Morristown, Arizona. The original property opened in 1896 and the historic hotel claims the title of state's first wellness resort. It is listed on the National Register of Historic Places. The hotel is a member of Historic Hotels of America, the official program of the National Trust for Historic Preservation. It is located within the Hieroglyphic Mountains.

== History ==
The Apache Wars discouraged development of the area until the 1880s. Prospectors acquired land during the boom of land speculation after the American Civil War. One prospector, Thomas Mann, hoping to capitalize on the geothermal springs, constructed a basic boarding house near the pools to attract outdoorsmen and travelers. The area transformed when the springs and the adjacent land were purchased by Frank Murphy for the construction of a health resort. The resort was completed in 1896 by the brother of the Arizona Governor Oakes Murphy, and the newly renamed "Castle Hot Springs" was heavily advertised to potential clients. During the resort's heyday in the 1920s it was visited by celebrities such as Zane Grey, as well as famous families such as the Rockefellers.

Former President Theodore Roosevelt stayed at the hotel in 1911. Roosevelt was in the area to see the construction of the nearby Theodore Roosevelt Dam.

The resort was used by the United States military as a rehabilitation center from 1943 to 1944 to treat injured veterans of World War II. Future president John F. Kennedy spent three months at the resort during this period to recover from his wounds suffered during the sinking of his ship, PT-109.

The resort continued to be commercially operated until the main building was heavily damaged in a fire in 1976. The resort still comprises its swimming pool, administrative building and guest house along with the springs, which produce 180,000 gallons of hot water per day. The resort became a stop on the short-line Arizona and California Railroad in the 1990s.

The property was sold in March 2014 for $1.95 million. In March 2018, the resort announced a restoration was underway with plans for reopening in October of that year. The new owners have extensively remodeled and added to the property, adding 12 spring bungalows - with hot spring fed tubs, and 17 sky-view cabins. The resort reopened to visitors in February 2019.

== In media ==
Castle Hot Springs Resort was the subject of a 1994 documentary film by Mike Smith and a fellow student.

== See also ==
- Sasco, Arizona
- Treasures from American Film Archives: Treasures 5: The West, 1898–1938 (2011) (disc 3)
- Santa Monica Army Air Forces Redistribution Center
