= Stanton, Arizona =

Populated place in Yavapai County, Arizona

Stanton
- Populated place
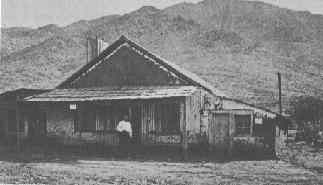
- Chuck Stanton in front of his store.
- Interactive map of Stanton
- Coordinates: 34°09′55″N 112°43′46″W
- Country: United States
- State: Arizona
- County: Yavapai County

Population
  - Total: ~3,500
- Time zone: MST (no DST)
- Post Office opened: March 5, 1875
- Post Office closed: June 15, 1905

Stanton is a populated place in Yavapai County, Arizona, United States that is now used as an RV park. The town was originally a stagecoach stop known as Antelope Station, and was later renamed "Stanton" after the businessman and crook Chuck Stanton, who took over the town in the 1870s. Stanton is located approximately twenty miles north of Wickenburg, at the base of Rich Hill, near the ghost towns of Octave and Weaver.

== History ==
The town of Stanton, like the towns of Octave and Weaver, owe their existence to a group of pioneers who discovered gold in the area in 1863. Led by the frontiersman Pauline Weaver, the explorers were camped along Antelope Creek when one of the men – a tracker named Alvaro – decided to go chasing after a runaway burro. After climbing to the top of what would become known as Rich Hill, Alvaro tripped over a pile of gold nuggets that were "as big as potatoes." Soon after, Pauline Weaver and a friend named Jack Swilling found another pile of gold on top of nearby Antelope Hill. Weaver said that gold was so plentiful in the area that he could pop nuggets out of the ground with a knife, and that one acre yielded nearly $500,000 in gold.

The 1863 strike transformed Antelope Station into a boomtown overnight. Originally just a small stage stop, by 1868 Antelope Station supported a population of 3,500 people. Chuck Stanton first arrived in town a few years later. He wasted no time in recruiting the help of some Mexican bandits so he could wipe out his competition and take control of the town. His first two victims were his neighbors, George "Yaqui" Wilson and William Partridge, both of whom owned a store and a stage stop. In August 1877, Stanton tricked Partridge into killing Wilson over some pigs, and so Partridge was arrested and sent to the Yuma Territorial Prison.

Once Wilson and Partridge were out of the way, Stanton focused on Wilson's business partner, John Timmerman, who arrived in town from Smith's Mill and formed a new partnership with a family-man named Barney Martin. Stanton's plan for dealing with Timmerman and Martin wasn't nearly as clever as Wilson's murder had been planned. He simply had his bandits ambush them out in the desert. The bandits also killed Barney's wife and his two little boys in what has since become known as the "Martin Family Massacre." Stanton was arrested for the murders, but due to the testimony of several false witnesses, the charges against him were dropped. Later on that year, however, Stanton was killed by a Mexican gunman named Lucero, and buried about a mile outside of town.

Following Stanton's death, the town continued to thrive for several years, but it was still considered to be a dangerous place. In 1892, for example, a Prescott newspaper reported that the residents of Stanton liked to "drink blood, eat fried rattlesnakes and fight mountain lions". Nevertheless, by the 1890s, Stanton was a legitimate community filled with miners, their families, a general store, a stamp mill, a hotel, a boarding house, and several other associated buildings. For some inexplicable reason, the town's name was officially changed back to Stanton in 1896. It didn't survive for much longer, though. By 1905 the gold in the area was just about gone. That same year the Stanton Post Office was closed for good, and the town was abandoned.

In the late 1950s, The Saturday Evening Post purchased the ten acre town and then gave it away during a "jingle contest." The new owners didn't know what to do with the town, and they later sold it. It remained uninhabited until the late 1960s, when hippies moved in and started burning the wooden buildings for firewood. In 1976, the Lost Dutchman's Mining Association (LDMA) acquired the property and has since used the town as a recreational vehicle park and campground, which is open for six months out of the year. The LDMA has restored a few of the town's original buildings, including Chuck Stanton's store, an old saloon and dance hall, and a hotel. The town jail is also standing, and work has been done to restore the town's pioneer cemeteries.

== See also ==
- List of ghost towns in Arizona
