= Red Rock, Pinal County, Arizona =

Unincorporated community in the state of Arizona, United States

Red Rock
- CDP
- Location in Arizona Red Rock (the United States)
- Coordinates: 32°34′29.24″N 111°19′28.62″W
- Country: United States
- State: Arizona
- County: Pinal

Area
  - Total: 47.31 sq mi (122.53 km^{2})
  - Land: 47.31 sq mi (122.52 km^{2})
  - Water: 0.0039 sq mi (0.01 km^{2})

Population (2020)
  - Total: 2,625
  - Density: 55.5/sq mi (21.42/km^{2})
- Time zone: UTC-7 (MST (no daylight saving time))
- ZIP code: 85245 and 85145
- FIPS code: 04-59760

Red Rock is a census-designated place (CDP) in South-Central Pinal County, Arizona, United States, located along Interstate 10. As of the 2020 census, it had a population of 2,625.

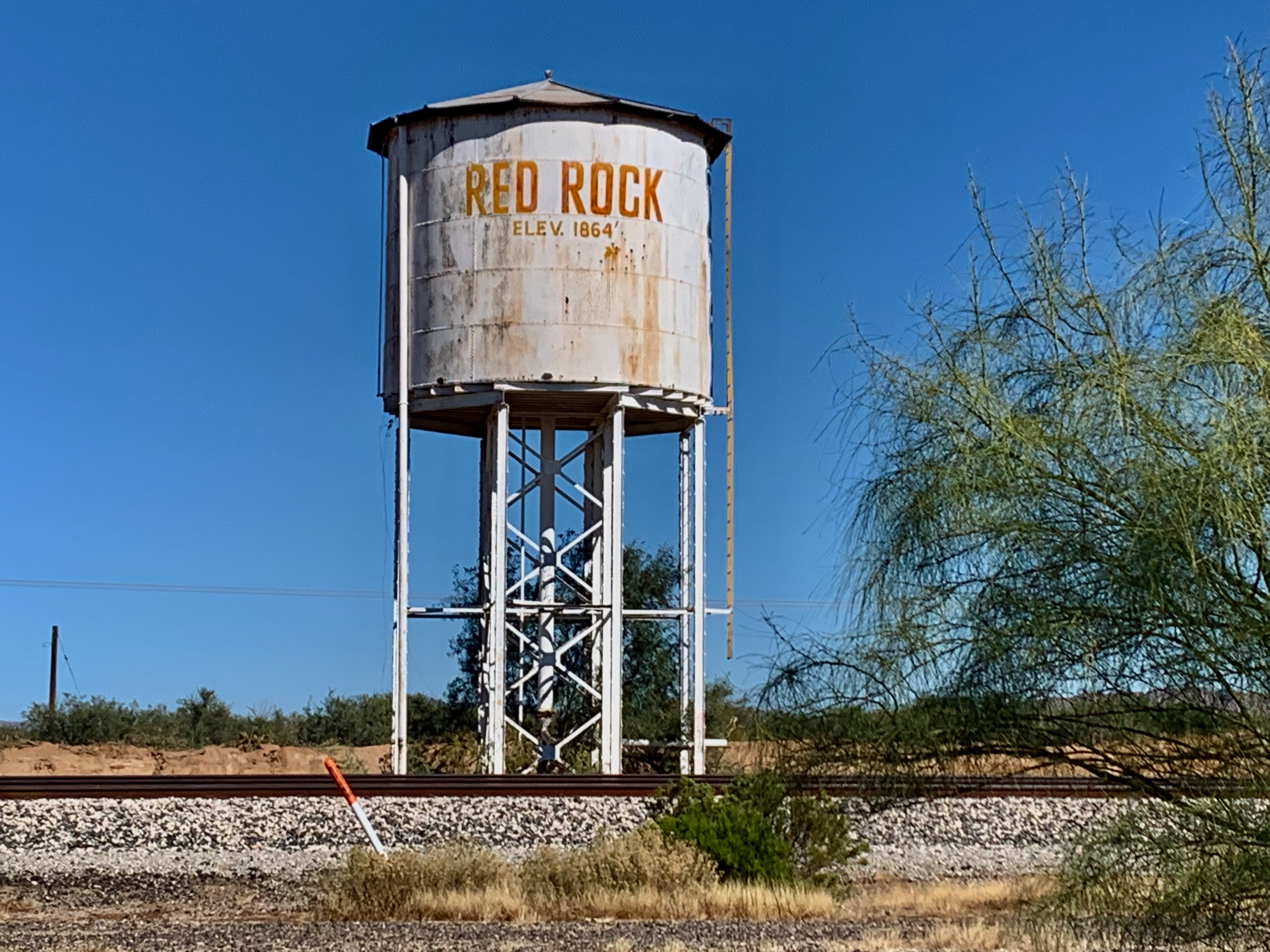
Red Rock Water Tank Near Railroad Tracks

The elevation is 1,865 feet (568 m), according to the water tower.

Mostly agricultural land until recent times, it is now starting to acquire some tract home communities.

The area also consists of large sections of undeveloped Sonoran Desert. Picacho Peak State Park is located about six miles northwest of Red Rock.

Red Rock also has a school called Red Rock Elementary school which goes from kindergarten through eighth grade.

Also home to the Saguaro Power Plant and the Saguaro Solar Power Station - a 1 MW solar trough concentrating power plant, both of which are owned by Arizona Public Service (APS).

ASU has contracted with APS to develop and operate a 29 MWdc solar facility at APS's Saguaro Generating Station near Red Rock, AZ. With the addition of this project to ASU's existing project portfolio, ASU will have driven the development of solar energy production beyond the 50MWdc milestone. As part of the transaction, APS will supply ASU with 65,000 MWh per year of solar energy, an increase of more than 150% above the current renewable energy used by the university.

Red Rock has a ZIP Code of 85245; in 2000, the population of the 85245 ZCTA was 332. Another zip code of 85145 was added.

Many homes in the area were built by PulteGroup.

== Demographics ==
Historical population
Census	Pop.	Note	%±
2010	2,169		—
2020	2,625		21.0%
U.S. Decennial Census

At the 2010 Census Red Rock had a population of 2,169. The racial and ethnic composition of the population was 66.3% non-Hispanic white, 1.9% Black or African American, 1.6% Native American, 1.0% Asian, 0.1% non-Hispanic reporting some other race, 5.8% reporting two or more races and 27.8% Hispanic or Latino.

== See also ==
- Santa Cruz River (Arizona)
- Sasco, Arizona
