= Pauline Weaver =

American prospector (1797–1867)

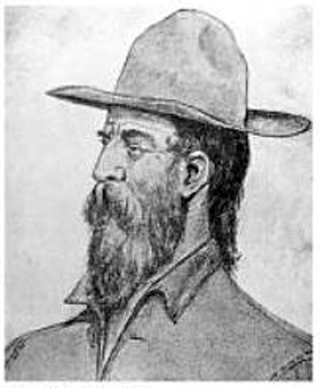
- Born: Powell Weaver c. 1797; White County, Tennessee, US
- Died: June 21, 1867 (aged 69–70); Camp Verde, Arizona, US
- Occupation: Frontiersman

Pauline Weaver (c. 1797 – June 21, 1867), born Powell Weaver, was an American mountain man, trapper, military scout, prospector, and explorer who was active in the early Southwestern United States. Several geographic features in Arizona are named after him.

== Life ==
Weaver was born Powell Weaver in White County, Tennessee. As a young man he worked for the Hudson's Bay Company in Canada. In 1830 he traveled to the Rocky Mountains with a group of nearly 50 other men on a trapping expedition. The trip took him to Taos, New Mexico, which he adopted as a base for his trapping and trading. It was among the people of Taos that his given name Powell was changed to the more-familiar to Spanish speakers Paulino, which in turn was translated back from Spanish to Pauline by English speakers. In 1831 he traveled from Taos to California, going through Arizona for the first time.

In August 1832, Weaver was baptized into the Catholic faith, and the next month he married Maria Dolores Martin in Taos. They had a son and two daughters. He later married a Native American woman in Arizona.

Weaver settled at a ranch near Banning, California, in 1845, and lived there for more than ten years.

Weaver usually maintained excellent relations with the indigenous peoples of the region, and consistently tried to smooth relations between them and the American settlers. Despite the usually good relationship, Weaver was seriously wounded in an Indian attack in the 1860s.

General Stephen Kearney recruited Weaver to scout for the Mormon Battalion in 1846. He served the military off-and-on for the next 20 years, as a scout and as intermediary between the Army and Indian tribes. During the Civil War, Weaver was the Chief of Scouts for the federal forces that engaged a Confederate unit on 15 April 1862 at the Battle of Picacho Pass in Arizona.

In 1862, Native Americans showed Weaver where gold could be found on the east side of the Colorado River. The discovery led to a gold rush and the establishment of La Paz, Arizona, which became a ghost town by 1875. In 1863 Weaver led the Peeples party on a prospecting expedition up the upper Hassayampa River to what was later named the Weaver Mountains where they found placer gold at Rich Hill, near present-day Yarnell, Arizona. In Weaver's honor the mining district was named the Weaver District.

== Death and further travels ==
Weaver died in 1867, and was buried at the Camp Verde army post with full military honors in recognition for his military service and for his services in keeping peace with the Indians.

When the military closed the Camp Verde post, Weaver's remains were moved to San Francisco, California. In 1929, Arizona Boy Scouts and school children raised money to have his body returned to Arizona, and he was buried for the third and final time on the grounds of the Arizona territorial capital at Prescott, Arizona.

== Arizona geographic features named after Weaver ==
- Weavers Needle in the Superstition Mountains
- Weaver Creek in Yavapai County
- Weaver Mountain in Yavapai County
- Weaver Mountains in Yavapai County
- Weaver Peak in Yavapai County
- Weaver Pass in La Paz County
- Weaver Wash in La Paz County
- Weaver, Arizona, now a ghost town, in Yavapai County
