= Murder of Sharon Lee Gallegos =

Formerly unidentified murder victim

Sharon Lee Gallegos
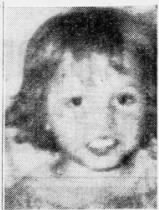
- Sharon Gallegos, c. spring 1960
- Born: September 6, 1955; Alamogordo, New Mexico, U.S.
- Disappeared: July 21, 1960; Alamogordo, New Mexico
- Died: c. July 21–24, 1960 (aged 4)
- Cause of death: Homicide
- Body discovered: July 31, 1960; Congress, Arizona, U.S.
- Resting place: Mountain View Cemetery, Prescott, Arizona, U.S. (1960-2022); Saint Francis Cemetery, Tularosa, New Mexico, U.S. 33.08087°N 106.01829°W (approximate)
- Other names: Little Miss Nobody
- Known for: Formerly unidentified victim of homicide; Formerly missing person; Unsolved murder victim
- Height: 3 ft 6 in (1.07 m) (approximate)

Sharon Lee Gallegos (September 6, 1955 – c. July 21–24, 1960) was a formerly unidentified American murder victim known as Little Miss Nobody whose body was found in Congress, Yavapai County, Arizona on July 31, 1960. Her remains were estimated to have been discovered within one to two weeks of the date of her murder. Due to the advanced state of decomposition of the child's remains, the specific cause of death of Gallegos has never been established, although her death has always been considered to be a homicide.

On March 15, 2022, investigators in Arizona announced the identification of Gallegos's remains, almost 62 years after the discovery of her body. The child had been kidnapped from outside her grandmother's home in Alamogordo, New Mexico by two unknown individuals ten days prior to the discovery of her body.

Gallegos became known as "Little Miss Nobody" after contemporary efforts to identify her proved unsuccessful and no family or friends came forward to identify or claim her body. Her 2022 identification is the oldest cold case identification in Yavapai County; efforts to identify her abductors/murderers are ongoing.

== Early life ==
Gallegos lived in Alamogordo with her mother, Guadelupe Gallegos, along with her two older siblings, Ramona and John, and her grandmother. Six other relatives lived in the same home, including four other children aged between five and fifteen. Her biological father, a soldier, had left the family when Gallegos was a baby, and the child had no contact with him.

Her family was not wealthy, and Gallegos's mother supported the family by working as a maid at a local motel. Despite general financial limitations, the Gallegos family was close-knit. Sharon herself has been described as a "feisty" and "happy-go-lucky" child who enjoyed performing simple errands for her mother and playing close to the family home with her siblings and other neighborhood children. Due to her fair complexion by comparison to her siblings, the child was affectionately known to relatives as "La Güera."

== Prior stalking concerns ==
Authorities believe the couple who kidnapped Gallegos had been actively stalking the child for days, if not weeks, before her actual kidnapping. On Sunday, July 17, a couple were observed in a distinctive dark-green sedan car with two children (one a freckle-faced male; one a "small" female) after Gallegos and her mother had attended a church service. Following the church service, the female abductor had asked several attendees probing questions pertaining to Sharon and her mother, Guadelupe.

Gallegos's mother later stated that her daughter's behavior had markedly changed in the days immediately prior to her disappearance. The girl became markedly nervous and wary, and suddenly ceased wishing to retrieve groceries for the family from a local grocery store (an errand she particularly enjoyed). She also became visibly upset whenever she observed this same distinctive dark-green car near her home or places she visited, asking relatives to pick her up and carry her past the vehicle.

Shortly thereafter, on or about July 19, this female abductor is known to have knocked on a neighbor's door, inquiring as to Gallegos's mother, her actual address, and asking about her children—specifically whether she had a little girl. Other questions asked included whether Gallegos's mother had numerous children and her current financial situation. This woman then claimed to this neighbor she wanted to offer a job to Gallegos's mother.

At the time of her disappearance, Gallegos was two months shy of her fifth birthday. She was approximately 3 ft 6 in (110 cm) in height and had light brown hair and brown eyes. She was last seen wearing pink shorts and white shoes. (Note: Gallegos's mother would state in a later interview her daughter was barefooted on the afternoon of her abduction, having left her shoes at home due to the hot weather.)

== Abduction ==
At approximately 3 p.m. on July 21, 1960, while playing with her two cousins (aged five and eleven), Gallegos was kidnapped in an alley at the rear of her Virginia Avenue home. The couple offered to buy Gallegos some candy and new clothing if she would get in the car with them. Gallegos refused, and the female suspect emerged from the car and grabbed the girl by the arm and forced her into the "dirty, old green car" (believed to be a dark-green 1951- or 1952-model Dodge or Plymouth sedan). This woman was described by the witnesses as a short, bespectacled and heavy-set individual in her 30s, with dirty blonde hair. The man was described as a fair, thin Caucasian with a long nose and straight, sandy-colored hair. Immediately after the woman dragged the child into the car, the driver sped away; the vehicle was last seen turning west onto Fifth Street at high speed.

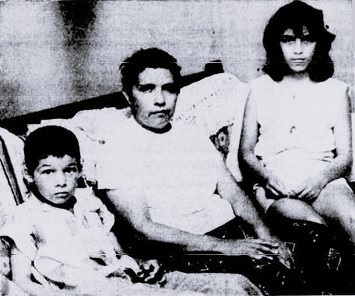
Gallegos's mother and siblings, pictured the day after her abduction

The child witnesses to Gallegos's abduction immediately reported the incident to her mother, who in turn immediately notified authorities. Within one hour, police had set up roadblocks at the Texas-New Mexico state border, ultimately searching numerous vehicles of the description described by the eyewitnesses at the roadblocks. This tactic failed to apprehend the abductors.

=== Motive ===
Although investigators remained open-minded as to the actual motive for the child's abduction, the prospect of kidnapping for ransom was quickly discounted both due to the family's modest means and the fact no demands for money were received. Moreover, the circumstances surrounding the abduction and evident previous stalking indicated the child had been specifically targeted. One of the child witnesses to Gallegos's abduction, 11-year-old Dolores Badial, was adamant she had observed the same vehicle into which the child had been dragged parked outside the Gallegos household shortly before the actual abduction as she and Gallegos had walked toward the vehicle en route to a local grocery store. According to Badial, the female occupant had been staring intently at the Gallegos household and the actual sight of the car had greatly distressed the child, who asked to be carried as the two passed the vehicle. (Note: Dolores Badial's older sister, 16-year-old Mary Lou Badial, also informed investigators that shortly before the actual abduction, she observed the female abductor sitting inside the vehicle, intently staring at the Gallegos residence.)

A friend and neighbor of the Gallegos family, Helen González, also informed investigators she had observed a dark-green vehicle matching the description provided by the eyewitnesses parked at the site of the abduction the previous Sunday. However, by July 28, investigators had announced their investigation into the possibility "a relative or possible acquaintance" of the Gallegos family being the abductor(s) had failed to bear any fruit.

== Discovery of remains ==
On July 31, 1960, the partially buried body of a female child was found in Sand Wash Creek Bed on Old Alamo Road in Congress, Arizona, approximately 29.8 miles from the town of Wickenburg and roughly half a mile west of Highway 93. Her body was discovered by a Las Vegas schoolteacher named Russell Allen, who had been searching for rocks to decorate his garden.

The body was clothed in red shorts and a buttoned blue blouse with a distinctive, vertical linear pattern. The child wore a pair of adult-sized rubber thong sandals that had been cut to fit her feet and fastened with leather straps. The child's toes and fingernails had evidently been painted bright red. Sections of the child's clothing were also recovered close to the shallow grave. The child's body was taken to Widmer Funeral Home, to undergo an autopsy.

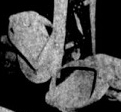
The sandals worn by the decedent, cut to fit the child's feet

Investigators at the scene later stated at the inquest that the individual(s) responsible for the child's death had possibly made two separate attempts to dig an alternate grave for the child's body at the location she was subsequently discovered. This conclusion was determined by two evident disturbances in the sand close to the actual burial site. In addition, evident tire impressions indicated the perpetrator(s) had driven off Highway 93 to the actual disposal location before "[turning] around" in their vehicle and driving from the actual burial location.

Two sets of footprints were recovered at the crime scene, one of which had evidently been made by an adult; the other possibly by the sandal-footed child, indicating she may have walked to the site of her murder. Investigators also recovered a rusted and apparently bloodstained pocket knife near the body, but were unable to definitively determine whether this item was connected to the crime. The clothing, knife, and footprint impressions found upon and/or near the child's body were sent to an FBI laboratory to undergo further examination.

=== Autopsy ===
The forensic pathologist who performed the autopsy determined that the body was that of a white girl, (Note: The actual race of the decedent was later ruled as being indeterminable.) most likely between the ages of five and seven years old, 3 feet–6 inches to 4 feet–5 inches in height, and likely weighing 50 to 60 pounds. (Note: Further examinations of the child's remains conducted shortly after the discovery of her body indicated she may have been as old as nine or as young as two at the time of her death.) The child had been dead for between one and two weeks prior to the discovery of her remains. Her hair color was brown, possibly having been tinted or dyed auburn, and she had a full set of intact milk teeth described as being in a markedly good condition.

The actual cause of death of the child was never determined by medical examiners, although her death was officially declared a homicide. (Note: Within a legal context, the act of homicide refers to all killings by other people as a result of a volitional act; not just the act of murder) Although unable to determine the actual cause of death, the forensic pathologist was able to definitively state the decedent had not suffered any puncture wounds or bone fractures, either at the time of her death or during her lifetime. Furthermore, the contemporary autopsy report states that her remains were charred, presumably from her body having been set alight around the time of her death, and none of the items of clothing recovered bore any puncture holes indicative of being penetrated by a knife.

Because the decedent had been in an advanced state of decomposition at the time of her discovery, creating an actual composite drawing of the child's facial features was not possible. (Note: Contemporary records retained at the National Missing and Unidentified Persons System state the child's face had actually been in a "recognizable" state at the time of her discovery.)

== Initial investigation ==
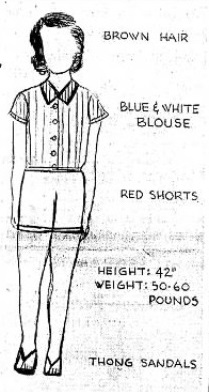
Police artist's sketch of the clothing worn by Little Miss Nobody at the time of her discovery and describing the child's estimated stature

With active assistance from the local media, private citizens, and (later) assistance from officials as eminent as individuals within the FBI, the Yavapai County Sheriff's Office worked tirelessly in their efforts to discover the decedent's identity. An all-points bulletin was initially broadcast across all sheriff radio and teletype networks following the discovery of the child's body.

Authorities interviewed numerous persons convicted of crimes against young children, and the sheriff's office also received dozens of letters, telephone calls, and telegrams in response to their nationwide public appeals for information in their efforts to discover the child's identity. Any possibility the decedent had been any known missing young girl was investigated, and discounted. (Note: Investigators initially speculated the child may have hailed from an impoverished background, and/or have been the child of migrants, although all investigative lines of inquiry into these theories failed to bear fruition.)

Due to initial eyewitness accounts of a family seen walking close to where the child's body was discovered on July 27, and that one of the two young girls within this troupe had been wearing similar clothing and sandals to the decedent, speculation that the child may have been a member of this family of transients was also considered. A known transient family named Davidson were subjected to over an hour of questioning in early August. The family had been seen hitchhiking close to Prescott in late-July, with a confirmed sighting occurring near Alamogordo on the date of Gallegos's abduction. Police questioning concluded that the family likely had no connection to either the unidentified child or Sharon Gallegos, and the family were released following the verification of their alibis.

=== Discounting of Gallegos ===
Investigators considered the unidentified child to potentially be Sharon Gallegos based upon her age (the decedent was initially determined to be aged between five and nine) and both the date and proximity of her disappearance. On August 2, a Yavapai County undersheriff informed the media: "It is possible that the body is that of [Gallegos], but we can't be sure." Despite the fact that the clothing the decedent wore was inconsistent to that Gallegos was wearing at the time of her abduction, investigators could not eliminate Gallegos as being the decedent due to this material fact, as her clothing and footwear could have easily been changed in the intervening ten days. Moreover, although the location of the unidentified child's remains was some 497 miles from the site of the Gallegos abduction, only ten days had elapsed between her abduction and this discovery.

Shortly thereafter, police released a statement indicating they believed the unidentified child—with a revised estimated age of "around seven"—was therefore older than Gallegos, and could not be the abductee.

=== Further investigations ===
As numerous leads of inquiry were pursued and discounted in the months following the child's discovery, Yavapai County Sheriff Jim Cramer, Deputy County Attorney George Ireland and other local law enforcement personnel expanded their search radius, ultimately travelling hundreds of miles via both air and land in their efforts to discover her identity.

In March 1961, a possibility arose that the decedent may have been Deborah Jane Dudley, a four-year-old girl missing from Virginia. Investigators had failed to find the bodies of Dudley and her remaining siblings after the body of her seven-year-old sister, Carol Ann, was found wrapped in a blanket on February 9, 1961; she having died due to a combination of the malnutrition, exposure, and neglect she had endured from both her parents. Deborah's remains were later found in Southern Virginia. She was later interred alongside her sister. The children's parents were later charged with both murders.

On August 8, 1961, Sheriff Cramer led a party of law enforcement officers and a camera crew to film the location where the child's body had been found. Later that afternoon, Sheriff Cramer and Yavapai County Attorney George Ireland presented evidence—including the adult-sized rubber sandals which had been cut to fit the child's feet—to the media, with Sheriff Cramer stating: "Somewhere, there is someone who has the answer that we have been looking for; maybe this will be the thing that will bring that person forward." The footage of this scene and the interview with Sheriff Cramer was later broadcast on television in the hope fresh leads toward establishing the identity of the child would ensue, although the program brought no significant new information.

Despite numerous and extensive local and national efforts conducted to identify the child, all contemporary efforts to either identify the decedent, or trace any of her relatives, failed.

External image
- The grave of Little Miss Nobody at Mountain View Cemetery

== Funeral ==
The funeral of the unidentified child was conducted on August 10, 1960, in Mountain View Cemetery. Local radio announcer Dave Palladin organized a campaign to raise funds to provide a dignified burial (as opposed to anonymous interment inside a pauper's grave). In interviews, Palladin stated his primary motivation was that he found the thought of a "little girl buried in Boot Hill" as being "insufferable" to him; adding his insistence that the child received a decent Christian burial. Prior to her funeral, the child had become colloquially known within and around Yavapai County as "Little Miss Nobody"—a name which remained affixed until her 2022 identification.

The funeral service for Little Miss Nobody was conducted at the Congregational Church in Prescott, Arizona, and was officiated by Dr. Charles Franklin Parker, with over 70 mourners in attendance. At this service, a placard was placed upon Little Miss Nobody's pale blue casket, with the inscription reading: "God's little child, date of birth unknown, date of death unknown." (Note: Among the several messages of condolence for Little Miss Nobody placed among the floral arrangements around her casket, one anonymous writer had written a note stating: 'Forgive us, child, for the weakness of men and, in turn, when in your final home, pray for us.') Her headstone is inscribed with a section of a quote from St. Matthew, which reads, "Blessed are the Pure in Heart."

During the eulogy at the funeral of Little Miss Nobody, Dr. Parker recited a poem entitled "For a Little Girl Unknown" before addressing those in attendance with a speech in which he stated: "Here is a little wanderer who has been in our midst. We don't know her name; we can only guess her age. It occurs to me we may not know, but God knows. There are no unknowns, no orphans in God's world. ... She doesn't need a name today. She has the name of an angel somewhere in eternity ... we may never know the why's and wherefores, but, somewhere, someone is going to be watching the paper to learn what happened to a little girl left on the desert. If there has been a misdeed, probably a disquieted conscience will go on and on." (Note: Within the eulogy he recited at the funeral for Little Miss Nobody, Dr. Parker predicted that the identity of this child would never be known.)

"Any detail, no matter how small [it may seem], is important in the quest to determine this child’s identity."

— Yavapai County Sheriff's Office, addressing the media following the release of the composite drawing of how Little Miss Nobody may have looked in life. March 2018.

2018 Forensic facial reconstruction of Gallegos, created by the National Center for Missing & Exploited Children.

== Renewed efforts ==
Due to recent advances in technology and DNA profiling, a decision to exhume the body of Little Miss Nobody to obtain a DNA sample was made in 2018, with The National Center for Missing and Exploited Children offering to pay for the exhumation and required testing. As a result, samples of the girl's DNA were successfully obtained from her body, and entered into both the National Missing and Unidentified Persons System and the National Center for Missing and Exploited Children databases for comparison with nationwide unsolved murders and missing person reports.

A renewed forensic examination of Little Miss Nobody's remains following her 2018 exhumation determined the highest likelihood of the child's age as between 3 and 6 years, with her height most likely being 3 ft 6 in. These updated estimates were based upon both the skeletal and dental conclusions from the examination of her remains.

The University of North Texas Center for Human Identification also created a detailed forensic facial reconstruction of the decedent, depicting how she may have appeared in life, before her body was reburied at Mountain View Cemetery.

In January 2022, samples of the child's DNA were sent to Othram Inc. in the hope advances in forensic genealogy may identify a close relative of the child and thus establish her identity.

== Identification ==
On March 15, 2022, the Yavapai County Sheriff's Office announced that Little Miss Nobody had been identified as Sharon Lee Gallegos. The child's identification was made via the usage of genetic genealogy analysis conducted by Othram Inc.: a corporation specializing in the usage of forensic genealogy to identify unidentified decedents. (Note: Previous genetic testing conducted upon the decedent had solely produced a mitochondrial DNA profile pertaining to the genetic background of the child's mother; the 2021 testing conducted by Othram Inc. yielded a more complete DNA profile. This profile was uploaded into the nationwide CODIS DNA database. No familial match to any relative convicted of a crime was obtained.) The child's identity had been established in February, although the official announcement of her identification was withheld pending Gallegos's surviving relatives' notification of developments. (Note: Gallegos's mother, Guadelupe, had died of natural causes in 2011 at the age of 87.)

At a press conference held to announce the formal identification of Little Miss Nobody, a spokesman for the Yavapai County Sheriff's Office informed all present prior to the actual announcement of Gallegos's identity of his hope nobody would again refer to her by the media moniker by which she had been known since 1960, adding the "unidentified little girl who won the hearts of Yavapai County in 1960, and who occupied the minds and time of our sheriff's office and partners for 62 years, will now, rightfully, be given her name back." A nephew of Gallegos then informed the media of the compassion given to his aunt by Prescott residents in the decades she had remained unidentified, stating: "[My family] were amazed how the people rallied around her. Thank you for keeping my aunt safe and never forgetting her."

=== Reburial ===
Sharon Lee Gallegos was reburied in the grounds of Saint Francis de Paula Catholic Church in Tularosa, New Mexico, on October 25, 2022. The child was laid to rest in the same grave as her mother and grandmother following a small ceremony attended by her family members. The choice of her final burial place was made by family members.

== Ongoing investigation ==
Investigations into Gallegos's abduction and murder are ongoing, with the primary focuses being upon identifying the child's abductors and determining the precise chain of events to occur in the ten days between the actual abduction and the discovery of Gallegos's body.

== See also ==
- Cold case
- Crime in Arizona
- Genetic genealogy
- List of murdered American children
- List of solved missing person cases (1950–1969)
- List of unsolved murders (1900–1979)
- National Center for Missing and Exploited Children
- The Doe Network
- Unidentified decedent

== Cited works and further reading ==
- Evans, Colin (1996). The Casebook of Forensic Detection: How Science Solved 100 of the World's Most Baffling Crimes. New York: John Wiley & Sons Inc. ISBN 0-471-07650-3.
- Halber, Deborah (2015). The Skeleton Crew: How Amateur Sleuths Are Solving America's Coldest Cases. New York: Simon & Schuster. ISBN 978-1-451-65758-6.
- Innes, Brian (2000). Bodies of Evidence: The Fascinating World of Forensic Science and How it Helped Solve More than 100 True Crimes. Leicester: Amber Books Ltd. ISBN 1-856-05623-6.
- Latham, Krista E.; Bartelink, Eric J.; Finnegan, Michael (2017). New Perspectives in Forensic Human Skeletal Identification. San Diego: Academic Press. ISBN 978-0-128-05429-1.
- Murray, Elizabeth A. (2012). Forensic Identification: Putting a Name and Face on Death. Minneapolis: Twenty-First Century Books. ISBN 978-1-467-70139-6.
- Newton, Michael (2004). The Encyclopedia of Unsolved Crimes. New York: Facts on File. ISBN 978-0-816-07818-9.
- Pettem, Silvia (2009). Someone's Daughter: In Search of Justice for Jane Doe. Plymouth: Taylor Trade Publishing. ISBN 978-1-589-79420-7.
- Pettem, Silvia (2017). The Long Term Missing: Hope and Help for Families. Maryland: Rowman & Littlefield. ISBN 978-1-442-25680-4.
- Ubelaker, Douglas H.; Scamell, Henry (1992). Bones: A Forensic Detective's Casebook. New York: M. Evans and Company Inc. ISBN 978-1-283-61515-0.
