= Weaver, Arizona =

Ghost town in Yavapai County, Arizona

Weaver
- Ghost town
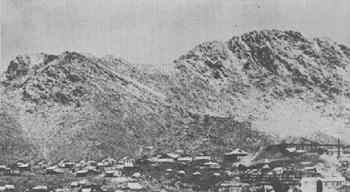
- The town of Weaver in 1888. Rich Hill is in the background.

- Location within Arizona
- Coordinates: 34°09′18″N 112°42′25″W
- Country: United States
- State: Arizona
- County: Yavapai
- Founded: circa 1863
- Abandoned: circa 1898
- Founder: Pauline Weaver
- Named for: Pauline Weaver
- Time zone: UTC-7 (MST (no DST))

Weaver, or Weaverville, is a former gold mining town, now a deserted ghost town, in Yavapai County, Arizona, United States. All that remains are some rusting mining machinery, a partially restored cemetery, and the ruins of a stone house.

== History ==
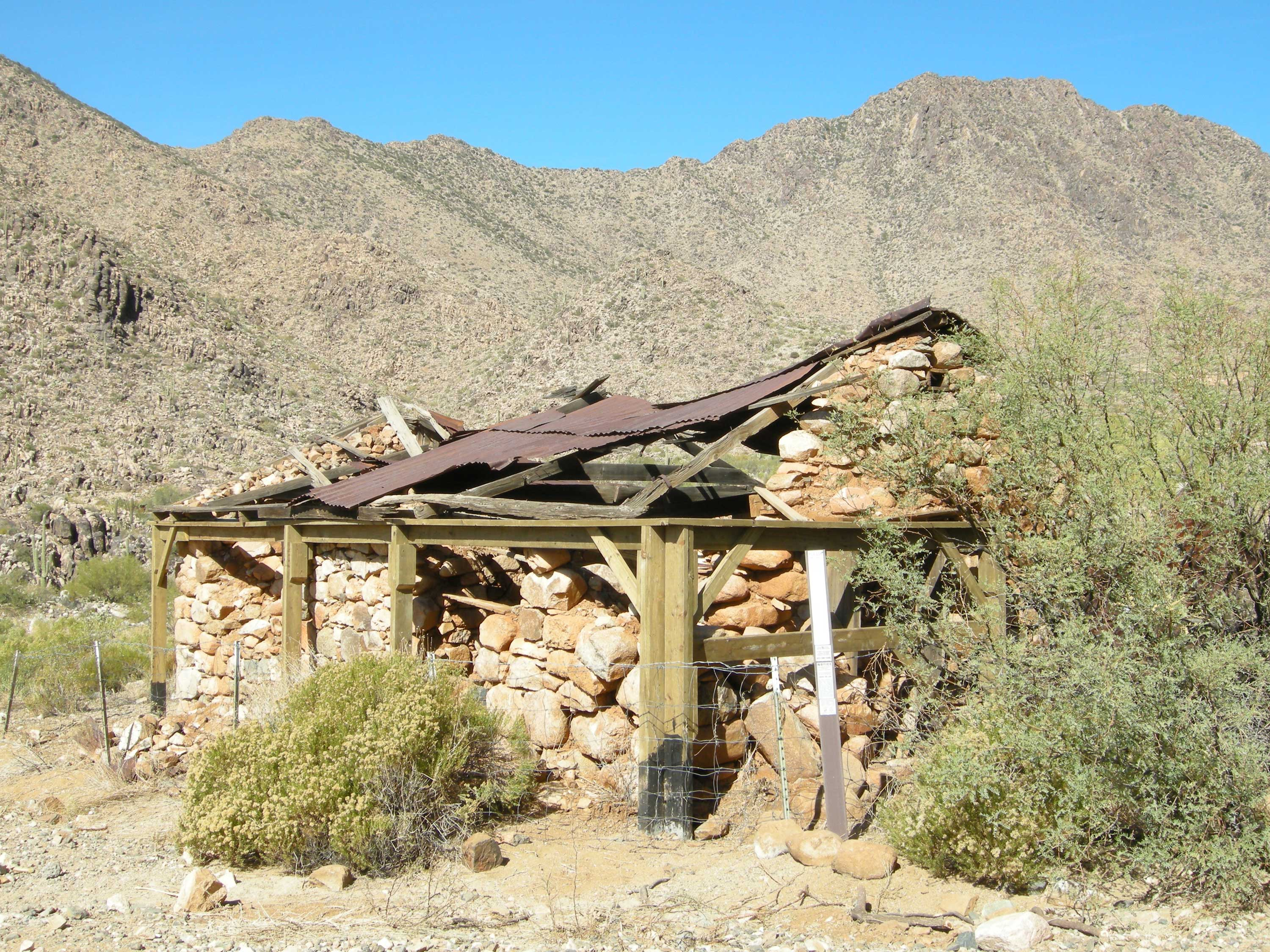
A ruin in Weaver.

The town of Weaverville was established shortly after the discovery of placer gold deposits on nearby Rich Hill in May 1863. The town was named after mountain man Pauline Weaver, who worked as a guide for the group of prospectors who made the discovery. The gold was discovered by a member of the party while chasing a stray donkey. After the placer deposits were exhausted, mining turned to the lode deposits that were the source of the placer gold.

Weaverville, soon shortened to Weaver, came under the control of Francisco Vega and his band of outlaws. Travelers and businesses avoided Weaver and its outlaw element in favor of the nearby towns of Stanton and Octave.

A post office was established at Weaver on May 26, 1899, but remained less than a year before it moved to nearby Octave on April 19, 1900.

== Geography ==
Weaver is along an unimproved road on the east side of Weaver Creek, at the southeast base of Rich Hill at 34°09′18″N 112°42′25″W, at an altitude of 3430 ft.

== See also ==
- List of ghost towns in Arizona
