= Van Ness Cummings Smith =

American city founder

- Born: 12 July 1837; Ludlow, Vermont, United States
- Died: 29 August 1914 (aged 77); Arizona
- Occupations: Businessman, Postmaster

Van Ness Cummings Smith was an American city founder and businessman who is best known for founding Roswell, New Mexico and being one of the founders of Prescott, Arizona.

== Early life and career ==
Smith was born on July 12, 1837 in Ludlow, Vermont one of four children to merchant Roswell Smith and Harriet (Cumming) Smith. He left home when he was a young man to take part in the California gold rush. After failing to make a fortune in California he joined a group of Argonauts who decided to try their luck in Arizona. They arrived near present day Prescott, Arizona in the summer of 1863. On November 24, 1863 at age 26 Smith was elected recorder of the Walker miner district. The census at the time showed he also became a rancher. In the Spring of 1864 Smith and the federal government decided to build a capital near Fort Whipple, Arizona. Smith contributed to the new town by bringing in crops. They named the town Prescott in honour of William H. Prescott, an American historian. In 1869 Smith along with his partner Aaron O. Wilburn arrived in New Mexico from Omaha, Nebraska. They built two adobe buildings , a general store, and an inn for travellers. Initially called Rio Hondo, Smith renamed it Roswell in honour of his father.

== Personal life ==
Smith never got married and had no children. He died on August 29, 1914, at the age of 77 and is buried in the Arizona Pioneers Home Cemetery in Prescott, Arizona
