= Octave, Arizona =

Former community in Yavapai County

Coordinates: 34°08′30″N 112°41′24″W

Octave is a ghost town in Yavapai County, Arizona, United States.

== History ==
Octave's population was estimated to be 100 in 1920.

It does have a cemetery and scattered graves.
