= Sasco, Arizona =

- Ghost town
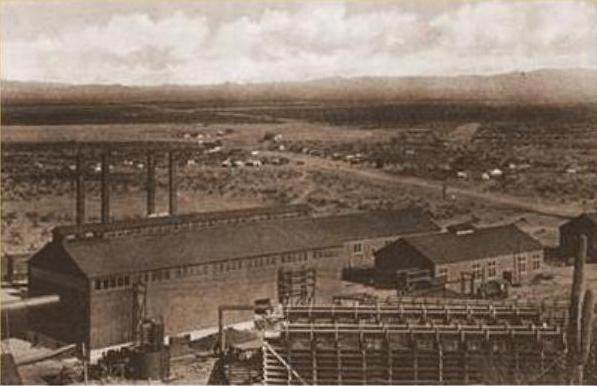
- The Sasco Power House with the town in the background

- Location within Arizona Location within the United States
- Coordinates: 32°32′06″N 111°26′22″W
- Country: United States
- State: Arizona
- County: Pinal
- Founded: 1907
- Abandoned: c.1921
- Elevation: 1,840 ft (560 m)

Population
  - Total: ~500
- Time zone: UTC-7 (MST (no DST))
- Post Office opened: July 10, 1907
- Post Office closed: September 15, 1919

Sasco is a ghost town located in Pinal County, Arizona, west of Red Rock. Sasco, which is an acronym for the Southern Arizona Smelter Company, was a company town with a large smelter that served several mines. Once an impressive and little-known ghost town, today Sasco is a common sporting destination with shotgun shells, airsoft bb's, paintball splatter, and litter in the area.

== History ==
Sasco owes its existence to the Development Company of America (DCA), which was headed by Governor Oakes Murphy's brother, Frank Morrell Murphy. Murphy believed that by consolidating the various mines, railroad, and processing companies in the Silver Bell Mountains into one single organization under his control, mining operations would be much more effective and profitable. Murphy's plan was years ahead of its time, because it called for the creation of one large mine that would employ hundreds of workers over a large area, as opposed to most other mines, which were still operated on a small scale, by only a "handful" of miners at a time.

In 1903, Murphy and his chief engineer, William Field Staunton, purchased the Union Mine and the Mammoth Mine in the Silver Bell Mountains and combined them to form the Imperial Copper Company and the Silver Bell Mine. One year later, DCA built the Arizona Southern Railroad to connect the Silver Bell Mine with the Southern Pacific Railroad at the town of Red Rock. Murphy's next move was to begin work on a large smelter complex and a new town to support it. The resulting Southern Arizona Smelting Company, or Sasco for short, was formed on August 10, 1906. Due to some initial financial problems, work did not begin on the new smelter until the summer of 1907, and it was not completed until February 1908.

When the smelter was finished, work on the town and efforts to attract settlers were undertaken. Soon the town of Sasco was home to a residential neighborhood of 600 people, as well as a few stores and saloons. Mead Goodloe, who oversaw the construction of the smelter, built a large brick home known as "the big house," which became the unofficial town center. A power house was also built to supply electricity to Sasco, the nearby town of Silverbell, and the Silver Bell Mine. In its heyday, the Sasco smelter employed 175 men and by 1910 had already processed 245,000 tons of copper ore.

Although Sasco was set to become "one of the premier smelting towns in the Southwest," its existence was very short. Between 1909 and 1911, problems with the DCA mining operations in the Tombstone area forced Murphy to file for bankruptcy, and the Sasco smelter was closed for the first time. Asarco took over the Silver Bell Mine in 1915 and reopened the Sasco smelter, which temporarily revived the town, but disaster again struck. During the winter of 1918 and 1919, the Spanish flu spread to Sasco and devastated it. Most of the graves in the Sasco Cemetery with plain concrete headstones represent victims of the pandemic.

Asarco closed the Silver Bell Mine in 1921 to focus on operations elsewhere, and in late 1933 most of the buildings in Sasco were demolished, along with the railroad that served the town. The remains of several structures can still be visited today, including the Hotel Rockland, the Sasco Jail, and the smelter complex. According to James E. Sherman, in his book Ghost Towns of Arizona, old broken glass and rusty cans can be found all over the area. The Sasco Cemetery is located northeast of the town site, next to the La Osa Ranch house.

== Gallery ==
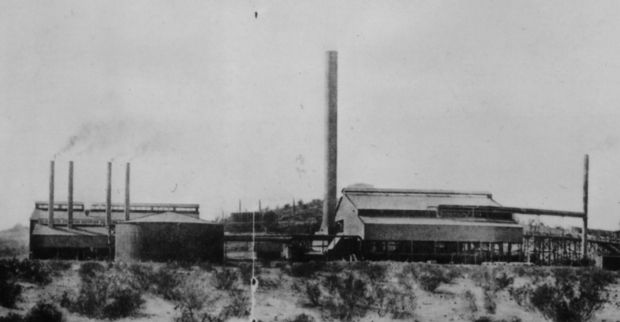
The smelter complex at Sasco in 1910.

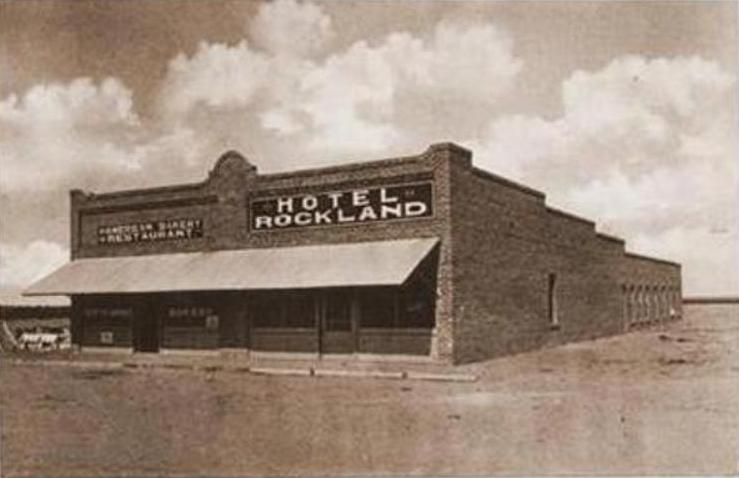
The Hotel Rockland sometime before 1921.

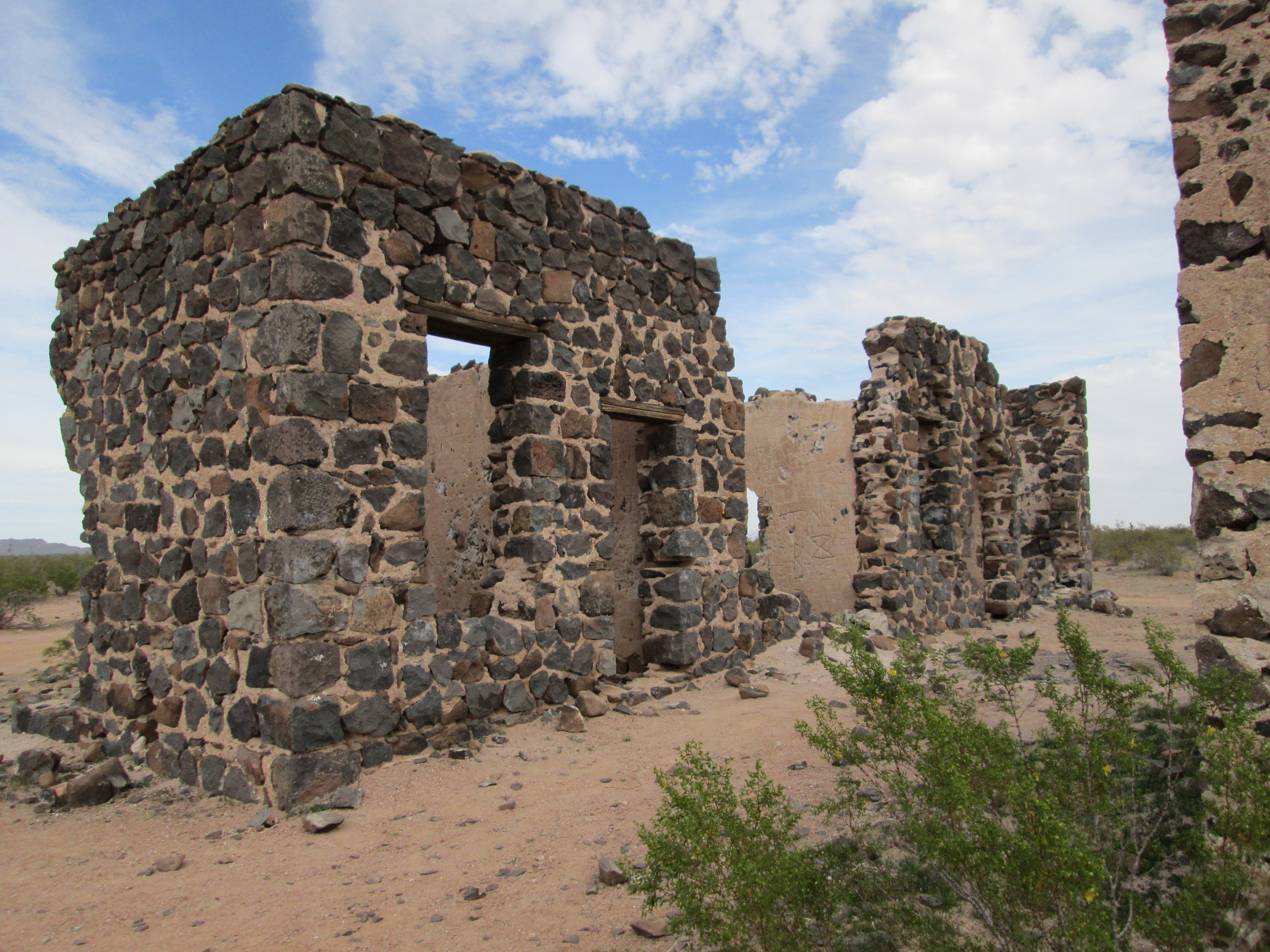
The Hotel Rockland in 2014.

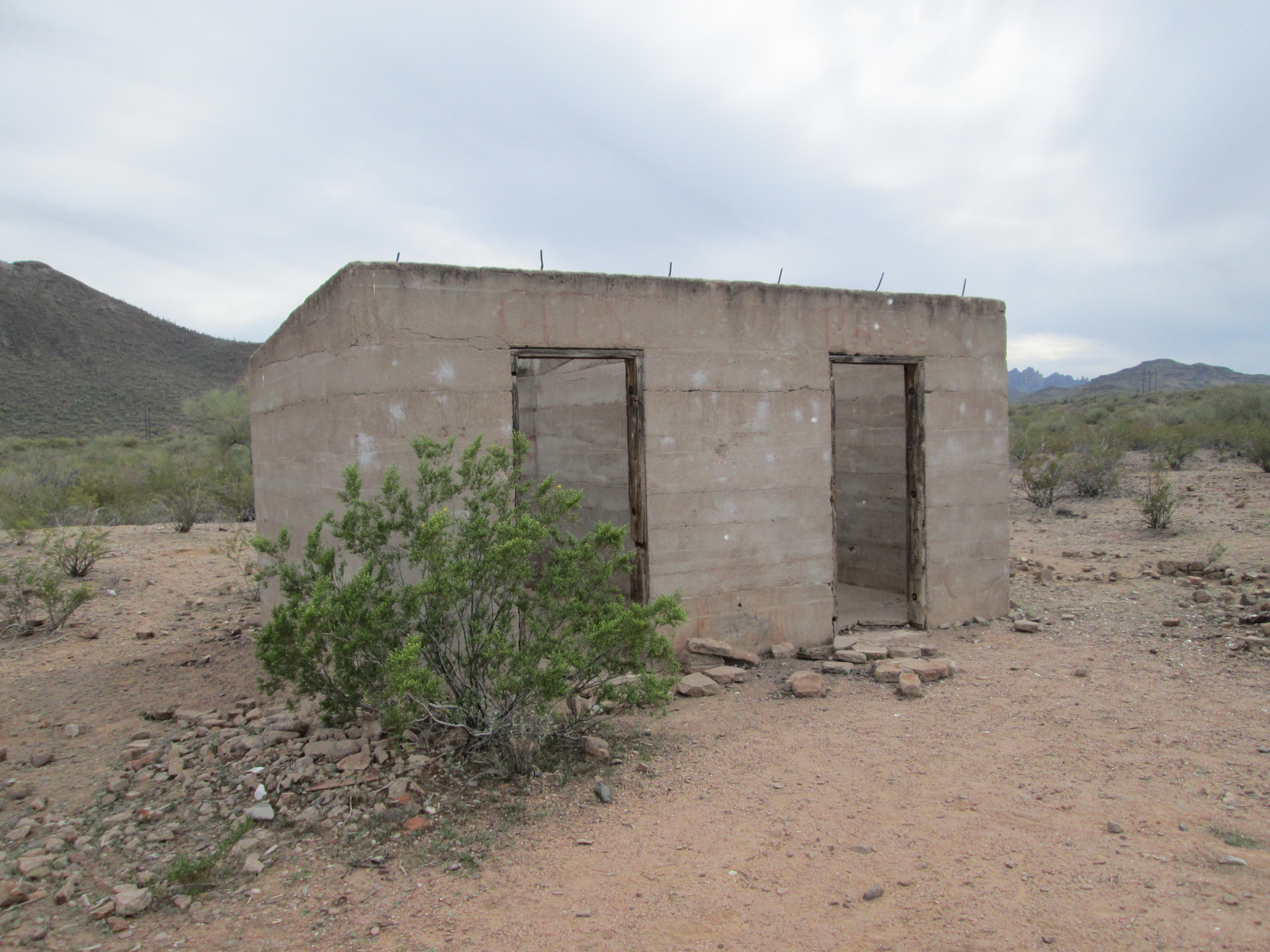
The Sasco Jail was built of concrete to stop prisoners from escaping.

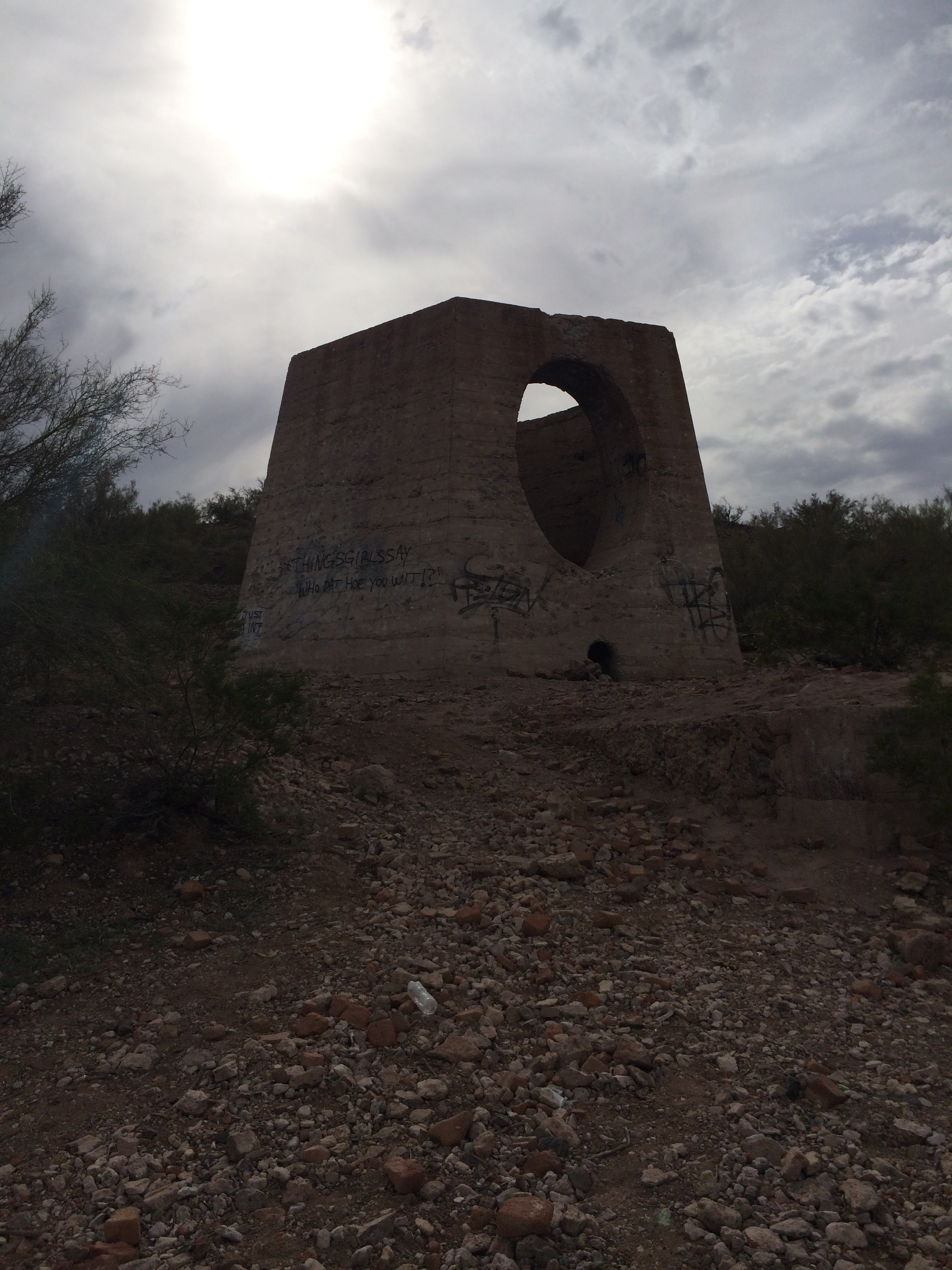
The ruins of the smelter at Sasco.

== See also ==
- List of ghost towns in Arizona
- Twin Buttes, Arizona
- Congress Mine
