= Bagdad, Arizona =

CDP in Yavapai County, Arizona

- CDP
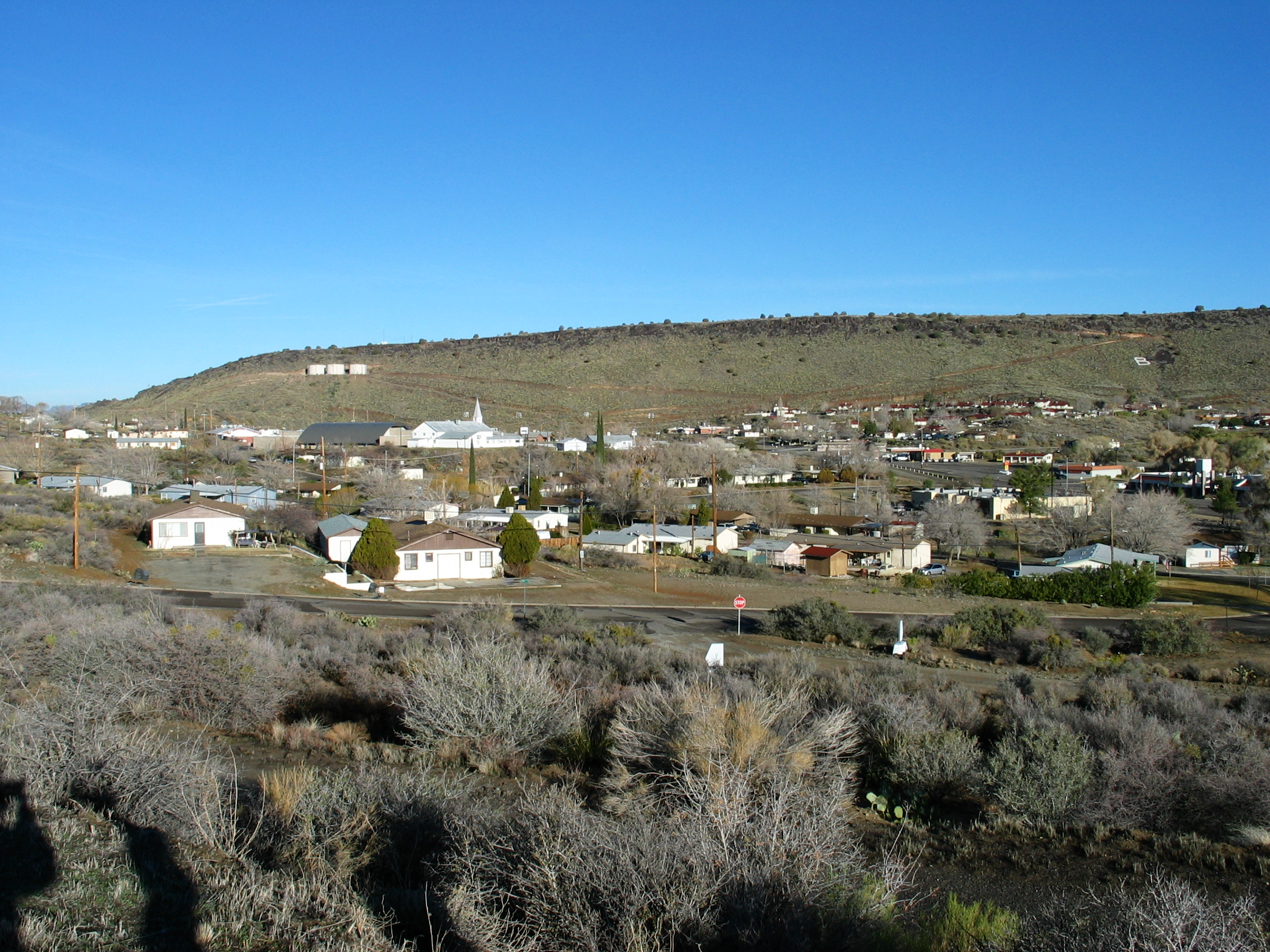
- Bagdad, Arizona townscape, January 2003

- Logo

- Location in Yavapai County and the state of Arizona
- Coordinates: 34°34′38″N 113°10′37″W
- Country: United States
- State: Arizona
- County: Yavapai

Area
  - Total: 8.06 sq mi (20.88 km^{2})
  - Land: 8.06 sq mi (20.88 km^{2})
  - Water: 0 sq mi (0.00 km^{2})
- Elevation: 3,793 ft (1,156 m)

Population (2020)
  - Total: 1,932
  - Density: 239.7/sq mi (92.55/km^{2})
- Time zone: UTC-7 (MST)
- ZIP code: 86321
- Area code: 928
- FIPS code: 04-05140
- GNIS feature ID: 2407792
- Website: bagdadaztown.com/history

Bagdad is a copper mining community and census-designated place (CDP) in Yavapai County, Arizona, United States, in the western part of the state. It is one of only two remaining company towns in Arizona. The population was 1,876 at the 2010 census, up from 1,578 in 2000.

== Name ==
According to folk etymology, the name "Bagdad" is not a misspelling of "Baghdad". Supposedly a father and son operated a small-scale copper mining operation there in the late 1800s. The father dug out the ore and the son loaded it into bags. When one bag was full he asked his father "Do you have a bag, dad?" However, this is disputed and some say the name derives from the Iraqi capital, Baghdad, imagined as an epitome of wealth and luxury.

== Demographics ==
Historical population
Census	Pop.	Note	%±
1930	275		—
1960	1,462		—
1970	2,079		42.2%
1980	2,331		12.1%
1990	1,858		−20.3%
2000	1,578		−15.1%
2010	1,876		18.9%
2020	1,932		3.0%
U.S. Decennial Census

Bagdad first appeared on the 1930 U.S. Census as the Bagdad Precinct of Yavapai County. It was recorded as having a Spanish/Hispanic majority for that census (the census would not separately feature that racial demographic again until 1980). With the combination of all county precincts into 3 districts in 1940, it did not formally appear again until 1960, when it reported as an unincorporated village. In 1980, it was made a census-designated place (CDP).

=== 2020 census ===
As of the 2020 census, Bagdad had a population of 1,932. The median age was 29.3 years. 32.6% of residents were under the age of 18 and 5.0% of residents were 65 years of age or older. For every 100 females there were 112.8 males, and for every 100 females age 18 and over there were 111.9 males age 18 and over.

0.0% of residents lived in urban areas, while 100.0% lived in rural areas.

There were 695 households in Bagdad, of which 44.5% had children under the age of 18 living in them. Of all households, 49.1% were married-couple households, 29.5% were households with a male householder and no spouse or partner present, and 15.0% were households with a female householder and no spouse or partner present. About 25.9% of all households were made up of individuals and 3.3% had someone living alone who was 65 years of age or older.

There were 821 housing units, of which 15.3% were vacant. The homeowner vacancy rate was 2.4% and the rental vacancy rate was 4.7%.

Racial composition as of the 2020 census
Race	Number	Percent
White	1,421	73.6%
Black or African American	4	0.2%
American Indian and Alaska Native	53	2.7%
Asian	27	1.4%
Native Hawaiian and Other Pacific Islander	3	0.2%
Some other race	149	7.7%
Two or more races	275	14.2%
Hispanic or Latino (of any race)	502	26.0%

=== 2010 census ===
As of the 2010 census, there were 1,876 people, 682 households, and 485 families residing in the CDP. The population density was 237.5 inhabitants per square mile (91.7/km^{2}). There were 838 housing units at an average density of 106.1 per square mile (41.0/km^{2}). The racial makeup of the CDP was 86.6% White, 0.5% Black or African American, 3.0% Native American, 0.3% Asian, 0.1% Pacific Islander, 6.3% from other races, and 3.3% from two or more races. 24.4% of the population were Hispanic or Latino of any race.

There were 682 households, out of which 43.4% had children under the age of 18 living with them, 57.0% were married couples living together, 5.9% had a female householder with no husband present, and 28.9% were non-families. 24.6% of all households were made up of individuals, and 3.1% had someone living alone who was 65 years of age or older. The average household size was 2.75 and the average family size was 3.29.

In the CDP, the population was spread out, with 33.1% under the age of 18, 8.6% from 18 to 24, 29.6% from 25 to 44, 24.3% from 45 to 64, and 4.4% who were 65 years of age or older. The median age was 30 years. For every 100 females, there were 123.9 males. For every 100 females age 18 and over, there were 119.0 males.

The median income for a household in the CDP was $58,277, and the median income for a family was $61,850. Males had a median income of $50,000 versus $40,506 for females. The per capita income for the CDP was $24,370. About 1.3% of families and 2.8% of the population were below the poverty line, including 4.8% of those under age 18 and 9.5% of those age 65 or over.

== Notable people ==
- Richie Albright (1940-2021), country musician

== Geography and climate ==
According to the United States Census Bureau, the CDP has a total area of 7.9 square miles (20 km^{2}), all land.

According to the Köppen climate classification system, Bagdad has a typical Arizona semi-arid climate, located on the boundary between BSh and BSk on climate maps.

Climate data for Bagdad, Arizona (1991–2020 normals, extremes 1929–present)
Month	Jan	Feb	Mar	Apr	May	Jun	Jul	Aug	Sep	Oct	Nov	Dec	Year
Record high °F (°C)	83 (28)	84 (29)	88 (31)	100 (38)	102 (39)	114 (46)	110 (43)	110 (43)	108 (42)	98 (37)	88 (31)	81 (27)	114 (46)
Mean maximum °F (°C)	70.0 (21.1)	72.3 (22.4)	78.5 (25.8)	87.3 (30.7)	94.0 (34.4)	101.5 (38.6)	104.4 (40.2)	102.8 (39.3)	97.9 (36.6)	90.5 (32.5)	79.8 (26.6)	70.6 (21.4)	105.6 (40.9)
Mean daily maximum °F (°C)	57.3 (14.1)	59.0 (15.0)	64.9 (18.3)	72.0 (22.2)	80.9 (27.2)	91.2 (32.9)	94.6 (34.8)	93.2 (34.0)	87.8 (31.0)	77.2 (25.1)	65.7 (18.7)	56.4 (13.6)	75.0 (23.9)
Daily mean °F (°C)	43.7 (6.5)	45.3 (7.4)	50.5 (10.3)	56.5 (13.6)	65.1 (18.4)	74.6 (23.7)	80.2 (26.8)	79.0 (26.1)	73.0 (22.8)	62.2 (16.8)	51.1 (10.6)	43.1 (6.2)	60.4 (15.8)
Mean daily minimum °F (°C)	30.2 (−1.0)	31.7 (−0.2)	36.0 (2.2)	41.0 (5.0)	49.3 (9.6)	58.0 (14.4)	65.8 (18.8)	64.9 (18.3)	58.3 (14.6)	47.1 (8.4)	36.5 (2.5)	29.8 (−1.2)	45.7 (7.6)
Mean minimum °F (°C)	22.2 (−5.4)	23.6 (−4.7)	28.6 (−1.9)	33.8 (1.0)	40.6 (4.8)	49.5 (9.7)	59.8 (15.4)	59.8 (15.4)	50.6 (10.3)	37.9 (3.3)	27.1 (−2.7)	22.2 (−5.4)	19.8 (−6.8)
Record low °F (°C)	9 (−13)	10 (−12)	17 (−8)	26 (−3)	31 (−1)	40 (4)	51 (11)	48 (9)	39 (4)	25 (−4)	18 (−8)	8 (−13)	8 (−13)
Average precipitation inches (mm)	2.14 (54)	2.32 (59)	1.74 (44)	0.60 (15)	0.37 (9.4)	0.21 (5.3)	1.25 (32)	2.33 (59)	1.36 (35)	0.89 (23)	1.03 (26)	1.64 (42)	15.88 (403)
Average snowfall inches (cm)	0.2 (0.51)	0.2 (0.51)	0.2 (0.51)	0.1 (0.25)	0.0 (0.0)	0.0 (0.0)	0.0 (0.0)	0.0 (0.0)	0.0 (0.0)	0.0 (0.0)	0.0 (0.0)	0.4 (1.0)	1.1 (2.8)
Average precipitation days (≥ 0.01 inch)	4.7	4.8	4.7	2.5	1.8	1.0	4.8	6.9	4.1	2.2	2.5	3.9	43.9
Average snowy days (≥ 0.1 inch)	0.2	0.5	0.2	0.2	0.0	0.0	0.0	0.0	0.0	0.0	0.0	0.3	1.4
Source 1: NOAA
Source 2: National Weather Service

== Copper mine ==
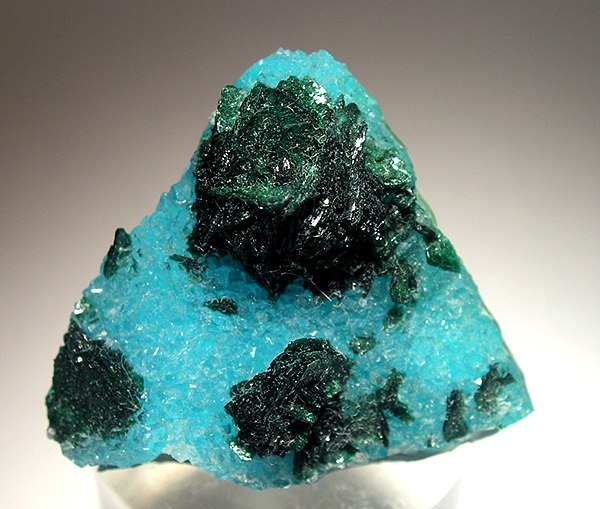
Malachite-Quartz-Chrysocolla specimen from the Bagdad Mine

In 1882, prospectors W.J. Pace and J.M. Murphy staked a claim for gold, silver, and lead along Copper Creek. In 1883, John Lawler of Prescott, Arizona paid Pace and Murphy $200 for their claims, but were unable to make a success of it. In 1907, the Giroux Syndicate purchased an option on Lawler's claims for $200,000 (equivalent to $6,000,000 in 2020), with Edmond Bronson as president. However, the mine was still not able to earn a profit, and operations languished off and on for years. In 1944, the operation was purchased by John C. Lincoln, the builder of the Camelback Inn, who converted the mine entirely from underground operation to open-pit. In 1979, the operation was purchased by AMOCO Minerals, eventually owned by Cyprus Mines.

Cyprus Mines Corporation operated the copper mine until Cyprus merged with Phelps Dodge. Freeport-McMoRan (which acquired Phelps Dodge in 2007) now operates the copper/molybdenum mine. This copper mine does open-pit mining and runs on an around-the-clock schedule. The copper concentrate is either trucked to southern Arizona, or taken by semi to 20 miles outside of town to the BNSF Railway's Phoenix Subdivision in Hillside.

== Services ==
Freeport-McMoRan owns all of the housing and commercial buildings in Bagdad. The town has a main shopping center named Copper Plaza, with a small Bashas' grocery store and other businesses. Copper Plaza used to have a bank, but Stockmen's Bank pulled out due to lack of profits. However, the Arizona State Credit Union and the Bashas' Associates Federal Credit Union (BAFCU) both installed ATMs inside Bashas'.

The Bagdad Community Health Center operates a medical clinic. Fry's Food and Drug operates a pharmacy in this clinic as well.

== Education ==
Bagdad Unified School District was formed on July 1, 1930. The first graduating class from Bagdad High School was in 1945.

The Bagdad Unified School District #20 consists of a high school, elementary school, and a junior high school. The high school and junior high are merged into one. All of the teachers in the high school and junior high teach every grade level. All schools of this district are now on one campus.

Bagdad High School consists of 7th through 12th grades. Bagdad Elementary School consists of preschool through 6th grades.

The Yavapai County Free Library District operates the Bagdad Library.

== Transportation ==
Arizona State Route 96 connects Bagdad with Arizona State Route 97 and Hillside, Arizona.

== See also ==
- Upper Burro Creek Wilderness
