= Arizona State Route 96 =

State highway in Arizona, United States

State Route 96
- SR 96 highlighted in red

Route information
- Maintained by ADOT
- Length: 21.79 mi (35.07 km)
- Existed: 1962–present

Major junctions
- West end: Old Dick Road in Bagdad
- SR 97 south of Bagdad
- East end: CR 15 in Hillside

Location
- Country: United States
- State: Arizona

Highway system
- Arizona State Highway System; Interstate; US; State; Scenic Proposed; Former
← SR 95	→ SR 97

State Route 96 (SR 96), is an east–west, 21.79-mile-long (35.07 km) state highway in central part of the U.S. state of Arizona. It runs from Bagdad east to Yavapai County Road 15 (CR 15) near Hillside. The road was built in the late 1930s and logged as a state route from Bagdad to Hillside in 1962. The section from Bagdad to SR 97 was never officially part of the State Highway system, though the remainder of the highway was officially designated as such at the turn of the century.

== Route description ==
SR 96 begins at an intersection with Old Dick Road in Bagdad. Approximately four miles (6.4 km) to the east is a junction with SR 97, which heads south to meet U.S. Route 93 (US 93). From the SR 97 intersection, SR 96 heads east through a desert area. The roadway then turns southward, and after intersecting Santa Maria River Road, it crosses the Santa Maria River and turns slightly southeastward. Through a hilly area, SR 96 turns eastward and passes through a series of hairpin turns. The highway ends at the west end of CR 15 at the intersection with Hillside Road. The road continues east as CR 15 (Bagdad Road) towards Kirkland.

The highway is maintained by the Arizona Department of Transportation (ADOT) who is responsible for constructing and maintaining highways in the state. As part of this role, ADOT surveys volumes of traffic on their highways. These surveys are most often presented in the form of annual average daily traffic (AADT), which is the number of vehicles that travel a road during an average day during the year. In 2009, ADOT calculated that an average of only 450 vehicles used the road daily at both termini. No part of the highway has been listed in the National Highway System, a system of roads in the United States important to the nation's economy, defense, and mobility.

== History ==
A road connecting Bagdad to Hillside was built by 1939. The road was logged into the state highway system in 1962, its extent defined from Hillside to Bagdad. In 1981, a right-of-way was acquired for the improvement of approaches and bridges on the route. In 2000, the portion of the route from SR 97 to its eastern terminus was officially added to the State Highway system. Although some signage west of the SR 97 junction exists, that portion is not officially part of the state highway system.

== Junction list ==
The entire route is in Yavapai County.

Location	mi	km	Destinations	Notes
Bagdad	0.00	0.00	Old Dick Road	ADOT signs this as the western terminus; road continues west as Main Street
	4.01	6.45	SR 97 to US 93	Begin state maintenance
	21.79	35.07	CR 15 – Prescott / Hillside Road	Eastern terminus; road continues east as CR 15 (Bagdad Road)
1.000 mi = 1.609 km; 1.000 km = 0.621 mi: Route transition
