= HonorHealth =

Private non-profit healthcare organization based in Scottsdale, Arizona

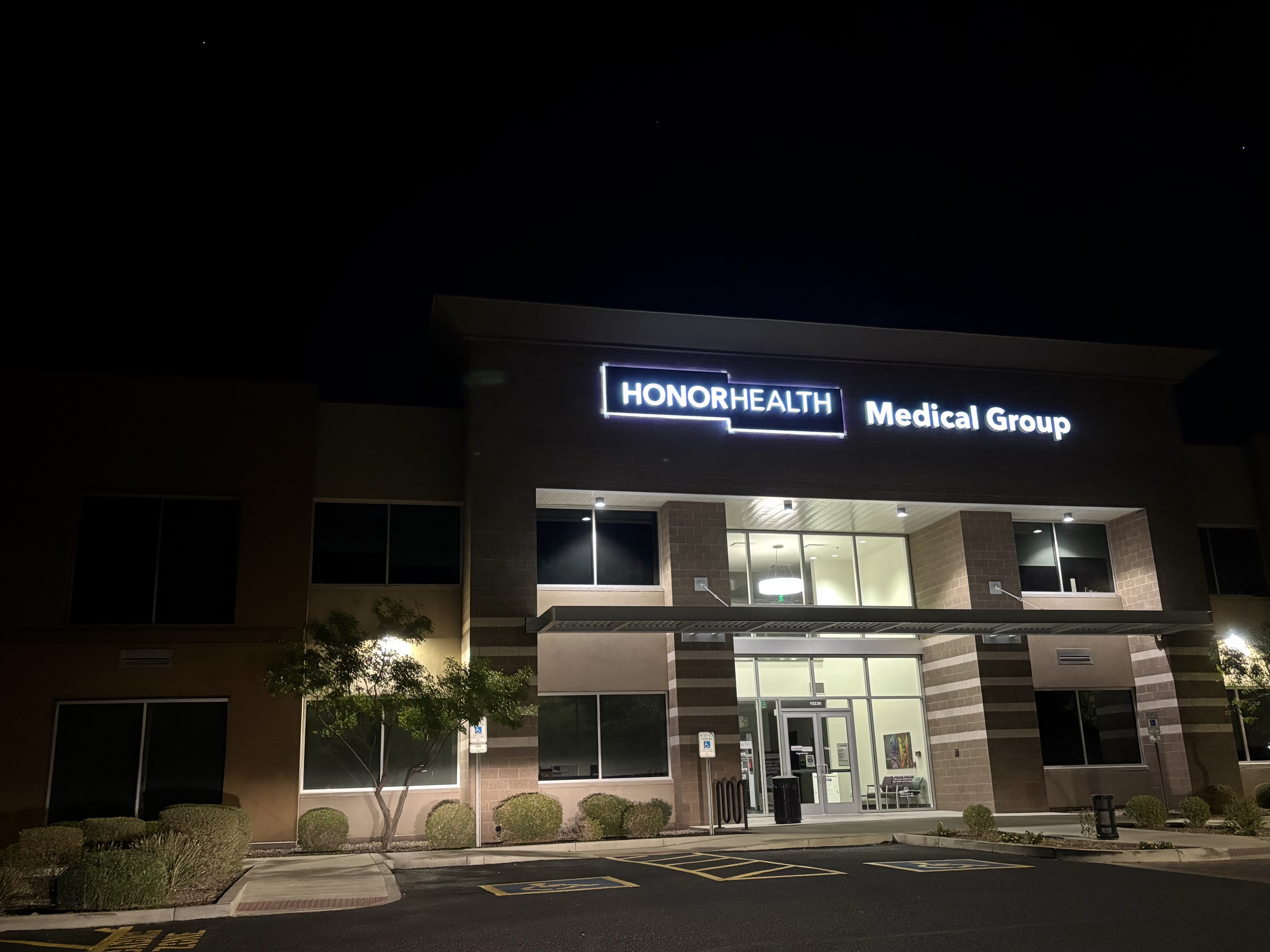
- HonorHealth urgent care in Peoria, Arizona.
- Type: Non-profit healthcare
- Industry: Healthcare, hospitals
- Founded: 1927
- Headquarters: Scottsdale, Arizona
- Key people: Tom Sadvary (CEO); Rhonda Forsyth (President); Steve Wheeled (Board Chair)
- Services: Primary, secondary, ambulatory clinics
- Number of employees: 10,500 (2023)
- Website: www.honorhealth.com

HonorHealth is a healthcare network in the Phoenix metropolitan area. The network encompasses nine affiliated hospitals, over thirty primary care offices, 24 urgent cares, as well as cancer care centers. The network is the areas second largest health network with 1,416 staffed beds, 66,000 annual discharges, and over $2 billion in annual revenue.

== History ==
HonorHealth is the result of a 2013 merge between two smaller Phoenix-area health networks — John C. Lincoln Health Network and Scottsdale Healthcare.

=== John C. Lincoln Health Network ===
In the 1920's, Arizona became a destination for people all over the United States looking for a cure for their respiratory illnesses, namely tuberculosis. Some migrants, or lungers as they were sometimes referred to, and families camped in the desert north of Phoenix (now Sunnyslope) with little money to spare. In 1927, Desert Mission formed to assist with food and medical needs.

In 1931, John C. Lincoln and his wife Helen, like many others, headed west in hopes of curing Helen's tuberculosis. They stayed in Phoenix, Helen recovered, and the two became actively involved in Desert Mission's work and its expansion into the area's first medical clinic and emergency station. Eventually, a hospital — Desert Mission Convalescent Hospital — was built at Dunlap and Central avenues. Lincoln, a primary financial supporter of the hospital, was honored in 1954 when the hospital was renamed John C. Lincoln North Mountain Hospital.

John C. Lincoln Medical Center still sits in the hospitals original location in Sunnyslope. The Lincoln family remains actively involved in HonorHealth, supporting initiatives and offering guidance. In 1997, John C. Lincoln merged with Phoenix General Hospital near Interstate 17 and Loop 101 expanding to a two hospital system as John C. Lincoln Health Network. The group also began offering primary and specialty physician practices to allow more comprehensive care for patients.

=== Scottsdale Healthcare ===
In 1962, the one-story City Hospital of Scottsdale opened to serve the growing needs of the community of Scottsdale. Today, Scottsdale Osborn Medical Center campus provides over three-hundred beds, a level 1 trauma center, and one of the nation's largest military trauma training programs based at a civilian hospital. In 1984, the organization opened a second hospital —Scottsdale Shea Medical Center.

In 2001, the Virginia G. Piper Cancer Center opened on the Shea campus. The center is known throughout the Southwest and the U.S. for its commitment to providing personalized cancer care.
