= Lincoln Institute of Land Policy =

American think tank

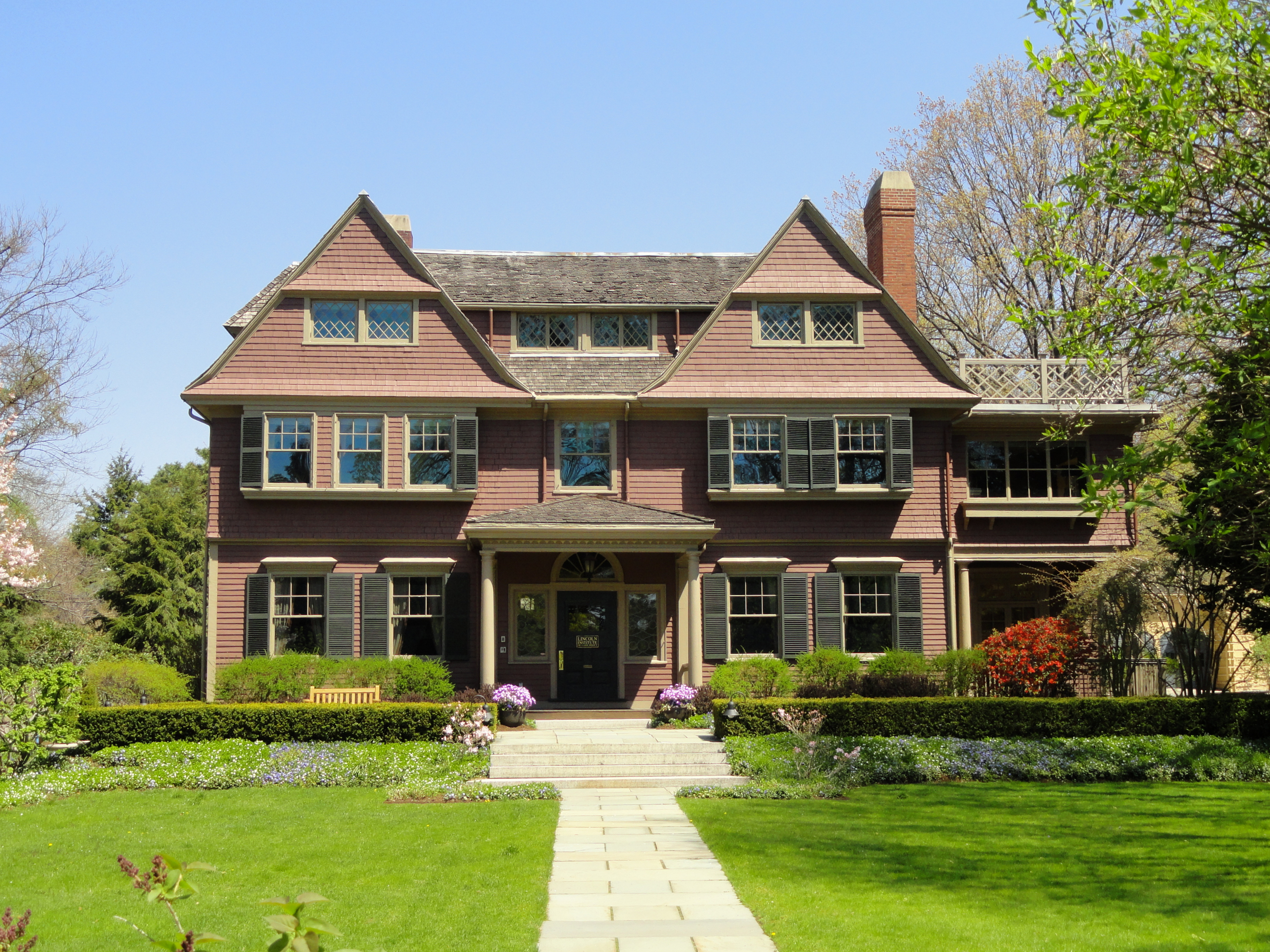
- The Lincoln Institute of Land Policy, Historic Building
- Established: 1946
- President: George W. "Mac" McCarthy
- Address: 113 Brattle Street; Cambridge, MA 02138-3400
- Location: Cambridge, Massachusetts
- Website: www.lincolninst.edu

The Lincoln Institute of Land Policy is a nonprofit think tank based in Cambridge, Massachusetts. Founded in 1946, it seeks to "improve quality of life through the effective use, taxation, and stewardship of land." Through education, training, publications, and events, the institute aims to inform international public policy decisions on land use with regard to economic, social, and environmental challenges.

George W. McCarthy succeeded Gregory K. Ingram in July 2014 as head of the organization.

== Publications ==
The Lincoln Institute publishes books and Policy Focus Reports that reflect research and document conference proceedings. The current publications catalog lists almost 100 titles, and nearly 1,000 working papers. The quarterly magazine Land Lines features articles on land use and tax policy topics. The Lincoln Institute also produces documentary films in the Making Sense of Place series: “Phoenix: The Urban Desert,” “Cleveland: Confronting Decline in an American City,” and "Portland: Quest for the Livable City," and supported the documentary series Shifting Ground produced by David Baron and airing on National Public Radio.

== History ==
The Lincoln Institute of Land Policy was founded in 1974, supported by the Lincoln Foundation, which was established in 1946 by John C. Lincoln. The Lincoln Institute and the Lincoln Foundation merged into a single private operating foundation in November 2006. One of the Lincoln Institute's founding objectives has been to address the links between land policy and social and economic progress explored by Henry George in his book Progress and Poverty (1879).

In December 2007, the Lincoln Institute and Peking University established the Center for Urban Development and Land Policy, located on the University’s Beijing campus to provide information and analysis on the urbanization in China.

In 2017, the institute established the Center for Community Investment and the Babbitt Center for Land and Water Policy, which focuses on land and water management in the Colorado River Basin.

In September 2021, the Center supported a report on "Groundwater and Urban Growth in the San Joaquin Valley" and in March they established a fellowship in Public Administration with Claremont Graduate University.

== Goals ==
The Institute listed six main goals as of 2021:

- Low-carbon, climate-resilient communities and regions
- Efficient and equitable tax systems
- Reduced poverty and spatial inequality
- Fiscally healthy communities and regions
- Sustainably managed land and water resources
- Functional land markets and reduced informality
