= Hillside, Arizona =

- Populated place
- Location in Arizona Location in United States
- Coordinates: 34°25′06″N 112°55′02″W
- Country: United States
- State: Arizona
- County: Yavapai
- Elevation: 3,858 ft (1,176 m)
- Time zone: UTC-7 (Mountain (MST))
  - Summer (DST): UTC-7 (MST)
- Area code: 928
- FIPS code: 04-33000
- GNIS feature ID: 24459

Hillside is a populated place situated in Yavapai County, Arizona, United States. The town was named because it sits on a hillside by Date Creek. A post office was established here on July 31, 1888.

== Transportation ==
Arizona State Route 96 connects Hillside with Arizona State Route 97 and Bagdad, Arizona to the west. Yavapai County Route 15 heads east from Hillside to Arizona State Route 89 at Wilhoit. Yavapai County Route 62 heads south from Hillside to Arizona State Route 89 northeast of Congress.

Hillside is on the BNSF Railway's Phoenix Subdivision.

== Hillside Elementary School District ==
Hillside Elementary School District consists of one K–8 school in Hillside, named Hillside Elementary. The district has one administrator and one secretary. The school is taught by one teacher with one teacher's aide. The enrollment is approximately 20 students in all grades. The school operates on a four-day schedule, Monday through Thursday and is in session 145 days per year. The school district is overseen by a three-member board, with one member serving as president. The average teacher salary is $48.582 as of 2020. In addition to Hillside, the district covers Yava.

After graduation, students continue their education at Prescott High School in the Prescott Unified School District, which is required under state law to enroll students from surrounding rural primary school districts. The bus ride to Prescott can be around an hour.

As of 2015, the Yavapai County Education Service Agency performs much of the office work for the district, so the district hired only two people for part-time work and therefore had lower per-student administrative expenses.
