= HonorHealth Scottsdale Osborn Medical Center =

Hospital in Scottsdale, Arizona

- HonorHealth

Geography
- Location: Scottsdale, Arizona, United States
- Coordinates: 33°29′17″N 111°55′23″W

Organization
- Type: Teaching

Services
- Emergency department: Level I trauma center

Helipads
- Helipad: FAA LID: AZ96
| Number | Length | | Surface |
| Number | ft | m | Surface |
|---|---|---|---|
| H1 | 65 x 44 | 20 × 13 | concrete |
| H2 | 65 x 44 | 20 × 13 | concrete |
| H3 | 98 x 54 | 30 × 16 | concrete |

History
- Opened: 1962; 64 years ago

Links
- Website: www.honorhealth.com/locations/hospitals/scottsdale-osborn-medical-center
- Lists: Hospitals in Arizona

HonorHealth Scottsdale Osborn Medical Center is a private, non-profit acute-care teaching hospital, a part of the HonorHealth network in Scottsdale, Arizona.

== History ==
The hospital was founded in 1962. In 2021, the hospital opened the 250,000-square-foot Bob Bové Neuroscience Center.

== Facilities ==
The hospital is an American College of Surgeons-verified Level I trauma center, an Arizona Department of Health Services-certified cardiac arrest center, and a DNV-certified primary stroke center. The campus is also home to the 15,500 square foot HonorHealth Military Partnership Program training center.
