= Arizona State Route 97 =

State highway in Arizona, United States

State Route 97
- SR 97 highlighted in red

Route information
- Maintained by ADOT
- Length: 10.91 mi (17.56 km)
- Existed: 1962–present

Major junctions
- South end: Future I-11 / US 93 northwest of Congress
- North end: SR 96 southeast of Bagdad

Location
- Country: United States
- State: Arizona
- County: Yavapai

Highway system
- Arizona State Highway System; Interstate; US; State; Scenic Proposed; Former
← SR 96	→ SR 98

State Route 97 (SR 97) is a 10.91-mile-long (17.56 km) state highway in the U.S. state of Arizona. It runs from U.S. Route 93 (US 93) northwest of Congress northeast to SR 96 southeast of Bagdad. The road was built by the late 1930s and improved during the late 1940s. Established as a state route in 1962, SR 97 was paved in the early 1970s. In 2000, the highway was officially added to the State Highway system.

== Route description ==
The route begins at an intersection with US 93 northwest of Congress and southeast of Nothing. Beginning at US 93 southbound, SR 97 crosses US 93 northbound after several feet. It crosses through a desert region in a northeasterly direction, meeting a dirt road that connects back to US 93. SR 97 curves northward before heading eastward at an intersection with Burro Creek Road. Again turning northeastward, the roadway meets various local roads, most of them dirt. The highway meets its northern terminus at SR 96, which continues northwestward toward Bagdad.

The highway is maintained by the Arizona Department of Transportation (ADOT) who is responsible for constructing and maintaining highways in the state. As part of this role, ADOT surveys volumes of traffic on their highways. These surveys are most often presented in the form of annual average daily traffic (AADT), which is the number of vehicles that travel a road during an average day during the year. In 2009, ADOT calculated that an average of only 550 vehicles used the road daily. No part of the highway has been listed in the National Highway System, a system of roads in the United States important to the nation's economy, defense, and mobility.

== History ==
The section of the SR 97 northeast of Burro Creek Road had been built by 1939. Between 1946 and 1951, the section north of Burro Creek Road was improved and the section south built as a graded road. The road was logged as a state route in 1962 along its current routing, connecting SR 96 to the rest of the state highway system. The highway was then paved throughout its entirety in 1973. In 2000, the route was slightly realigned because of a widening project on US 93 from a two-lane highway to a four-lane divided highway. That same year, SR 97 officially became a State Highway.

== Junction list ==
The entire route is in Yavapai County.

Location	mi	km	Destinations	Notes
	0.00	0.00	Future I-11 / US 93 – Wickenburg	Southern terminus
	10.91	17.56	SR 96 – Bagdad, Hillside, Prescott	Northern terminus
1.000 mi = 1.609 km; 1.000 km = 0.621 mi
