= Lincoln Electric =

American multinational manufacturer of welding products

Lincoln Electric Holdings, Inc.
- Type: Public
- Traded as: Nasdaq: LECO; S&P 400 component
- Industry: Manufacturing
- Founded: 1895; 131 years ago
- Founder: John C. Lincoln
- Headquarters: Euclid, Ohio, US
- Area served: Worldwide
- Key people: James F. Lincoln, Steve Hedlund (president and CEO)
- Products: Arc welding equipment; Electric motors
- Revenue: ▲US$4.23 billion (2025)
- Net income: ▲US$521 million (2025)
- Number of employees: c. 12,000 (2022)
- Website: lincolnelectric.com

Lincoln Electric Holdings, Inc. is an American multinational and global manufacturer of welding products, arc welding equipment, welding accessories, plasma and oxy–fuel cutting equipment and robotic welding systems headquartered in Euclid, Ohio. By 2012 it had a network of distributors and sales offices covering more than 160 countries and 42 manufacturing locations in North America, Europe, the Middle East, Asia and Latin America. It also operates manufacturing alliances and joint ventures in 19 countries. It is a member of the Fortune 1000.

== History ==
The company was founded in 1895 by John C. Lincoln with an investment of $200 to make electric motors he had designed. The company was initially headquartered in Euclid, Ohio.

In 1907 shortly after an illness, James Finney Lincoln asked his brother for a job and was paid to sell the machines manufactured in his brother's shop. In 1914 John retreated into product invention and turned the management of the firm over to James.

Around 1910 the firm produced a revolution in the building trades: rather than rivet the joints in constructions made of steel, the novel arc welder produced these with more rigidity and at less cost. This allowed bigger buildings, bridges and ships and led to the pipeline industry.

In 1914 James constituted the company's Advisory Board of elected shop floor workers, which meets biweekly to review problems and successes. This board is credited by some with avoiding unionization for more than a hundred years.

Around 1915, James Lincoln decided to change the method of remuneration he paid employees from hourly paid wage onto the piecework system.

By 1918 the company was touting the benefits of electric arc welding in self-published book form.

In 1927 the company introduced the E6010 Fleetweld electrode with which it made its fortune.

In 1934 Lincoln added an annual merit pay bonus scheme, according to which employees would receive sometimes up to 100% of their piecework "wage".

During World War II the company was sued by the federal government because they deemed its novel practice of paying employee bonus was not a deductible business cost. More than a decade later, the court ruled in favour of Lincoln Electric and established in Lincoln Electric Co. v. Commissioner of Internal Rev., 162 F.2d 379 (6th Cir. 1947) that performance pay was a legitimate cost of doing business.

It was during the 1940s that the company introduced the legendary SA-200 welding trailer, particularly prized by the pipeline industry.

The company estimated that it furnished one-third of all the welding electrode used in WW2 ship, tank, pipeline and synthetic rubber industries. The construction of a single Liberty Ship needed 160,000 pounds of electrode, while a Victory Ship consumed more than 190,000 pounds of electrode.

The life-long tenure for industrial workers was trialled by James in 1951 and made formal policy in 1958 for every employee on their third anniversary. In exchange the worker commits to total flexibility in terms of his duties.

In the late 1980s the company decided to expand overseas and nearly went bankrupt. In 1993 the workers needed to rescue the company from the folly of chairman George Willis and president Donald Hastings. In 1994 the company returned to profitability, and in 1995 it went public on the NYSE.

The Lincoln Electric company is the single most studied example at Harvard Business School for its innovative management features; James Finney tied his company's success to his analysis of the biblical Sermon on the Mount.

By the 21st century the company had grown to 44 manufacturing locations, including operations and joint ventures in 19 countries and an international network of distributors and sales offices covering more than 160 countries.

Lincoln has had over 8,500 employees globally, including 3,000 in the United States.

In 2005, Lincoln's Electric acquired the Harris Products Group, which is a manufacturer of welding accessories, gas apparatus, and other specialty products. The Harris Products Group has manufacturing facilities in Georgia, Ohio, California, Poland, Mexico, Brazil and Italy.

In 2017 Lincoln Electric acquired the welding business of Air Liquide.

In 2019, Lincoln announced the acquisition a portion of Worthington Industries, Inc. soldering operations.

Also in 2019 the company bought additive manufacturing specialist Baker Industries.

In December 2023, Lincoln Electric unveiled the Velion DC fast electric vehicle charging station. A display unit was shown at CES 2024 and featured NACS and CCS1 charging plugs, along with a touchscreen user interface developed using Qt.

=== Manganism lawsuit ===
A particular disease in welders is known as manganism, and is produced by off-gas. Lincoln was named in several lawsuits along with other welding industry companies in the 2000s, but Lincoln was absolved because it had advertised the risk.

=== Lincoln Institute of Land Policy ===
The Lincoln Institute of Land Policy was established by Lincoln Electric's founder, John C. Lincoln, in 1946, based on his admiration for the work of Henry George. Today, the think tank still focuses on promoting "creative approaches to land as a solution to economic, social, and environmental challenges."

=== Lincoln Welding School ===
The Lincoln Electric Welding School was set up in 1917 and has in a century since instructed over 150,000 men and women in the various methods and techniques of safety and arc welding processes. The school is listed by the Ohio State Board of School and College Registration.
