= Camelback Inn =

Historic resort and spa in Arizona

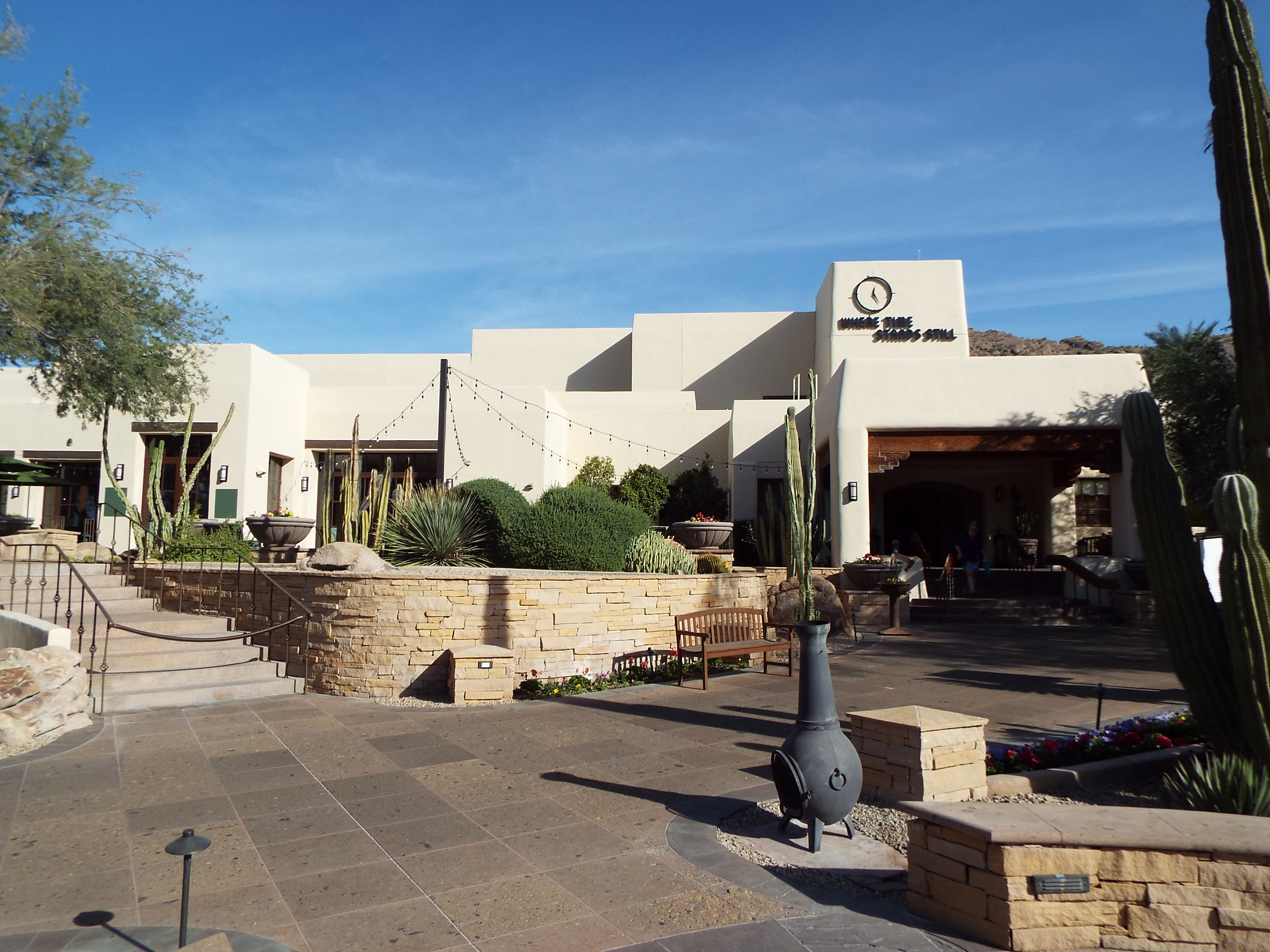
- JW Marriott Camelback Inn

- Location within Arizona

General information
- Location: 5402 East Lincoln Drive, Paradise Valley, Arizona, US
- Coordinates: 33.5341°N 111.9648°W
- Opening: December 15, 1936
- Owner: Marriott International, Inc.
- Management: Marriott International, Inc.

Design and construction
- Developer: Jack Stewart

Other information
- Number of rooms: 453
- Number of restaurants: 6

Website
- www.camelbackinn.com

JW Marriott Scottsdale Camelback Inn Resort and Spa is a historic resort and spa owned by Marriott International, Inc, located on the southern slope of Mummy Mountain in Paradise Valley, Arizona, United States. The Camelback Inn was established in 1936 by Jack Bell Stewart and John C. Lincoln. Its popularity among Hollywood celebrities and political leaders made it a significant contributor to the region's growth. In 2012, Camelback Inn was one of three North American hotels which had maintained a AAA 5-Diamond rating since the award's inception in 1975. In 2013, AAA reduced the hotel's status to four diamonds.

== History ==
In the 1930s, Jack Stewart, a sportswriter and publicist from Fargo, North Dakota, wanted to build a pueblo-style hotel which could reflect Southwestern and Native American culture rather than the more commonplace dude ranch-style resort. Stewart's project was funded by John C. Lincoln, an industrialist and founder of Lincoln Electric, who provided $200,000 and the land which Lincoln owned between the slopes of Mummy and Camelback Mountains. The property was remote desert scrub land located 12 miles (19 km) outside Phoenix and had no water, electricity or telephone access. The resort was constructed of adobe bricks which were made on the site. The rooms were housed in small adobe casitas (Spanish for "small houses"), each named after local cacti and decorated with Native American art.

Camelback Inn opened on December 15, 1936 with the slogan "Where Time Stands Still". There were accommodations for 77 guests. Despite the poor economy of the Great Depression, the resort became an immediate success by catering to a wealthy clientele.

Stewart operated Camelback Inn as a part-owner until 1968, when the resort was acquired by Marriott International and renamed Marriott's Camelback Inn. Bill Marriott had first stayed at the resort with his parents as a 16-year-old in 1948. At the time of Marriott's purchase, Camelback Inn was still a seasonal winter resort with 170 rooms and no air conditioning.

In March 2003, the hotel was officially rebranded by its parent corporation as Camelback Inn, a JW Marriott Resort & Spa. Camelback Inn underwent a $45 million expansion and renovation in 2008 which included the addition of a new ballroom and two restaurants.

== Accommodations ==
The Camelback Inn provides 453 casitas (Spanish for "small houses") including 18 larger suites, some with private swimming pools, across a 125-acre (0.51 km^{2}) property. There is a spa with a fitness room, aerobics room, six tennis courts, volleyball court, basketball court and pitch-and-putt golf. There are two heated pools: the spa lap pool and the "JackRabbit" pool with food and beverage service. The resort incorporates the Camelback Golf Club, located four miles away on the northeast side of Mummy Mountain, with two 18-hole golf courses.

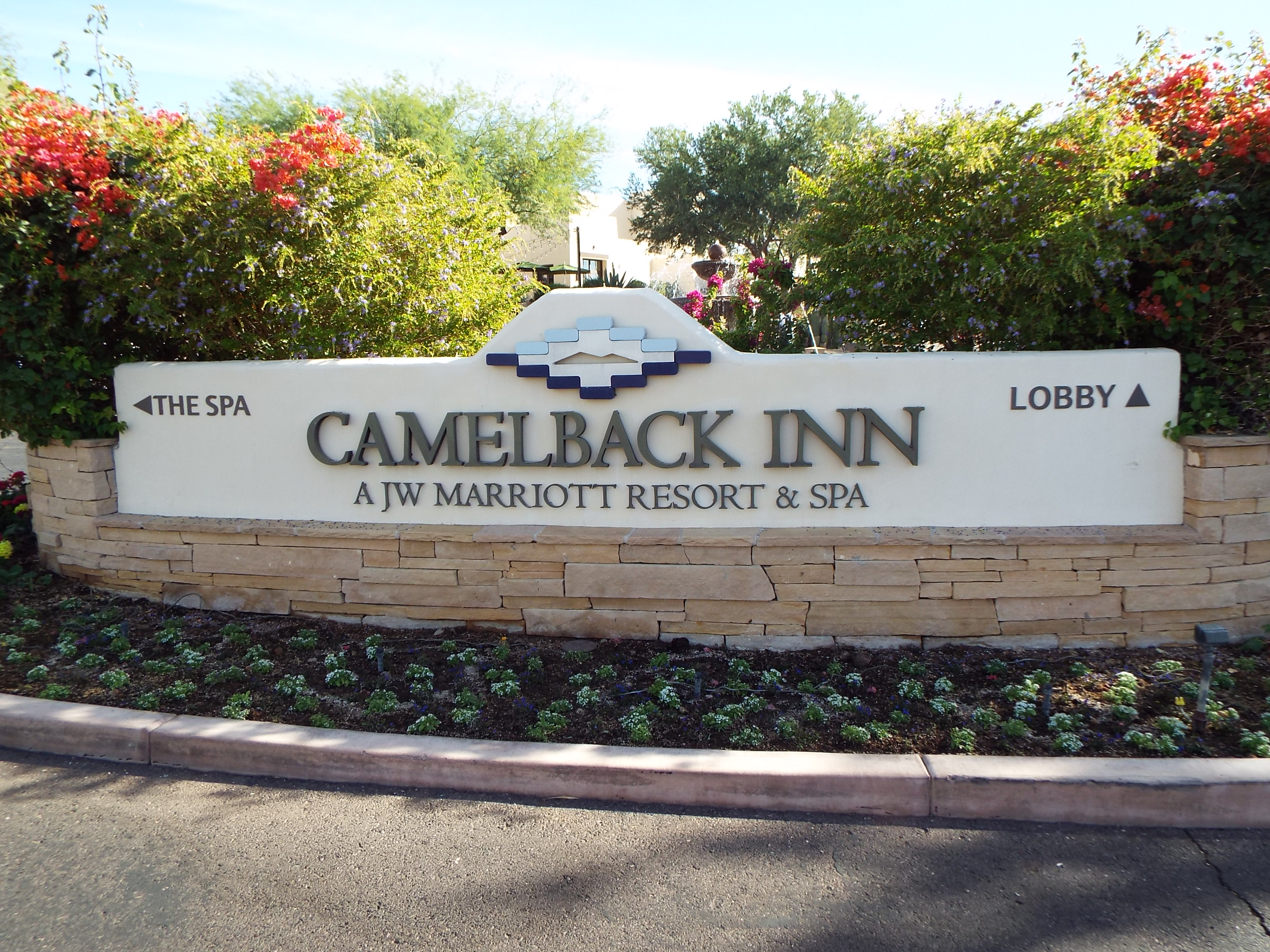
Camelback Inn entrance.

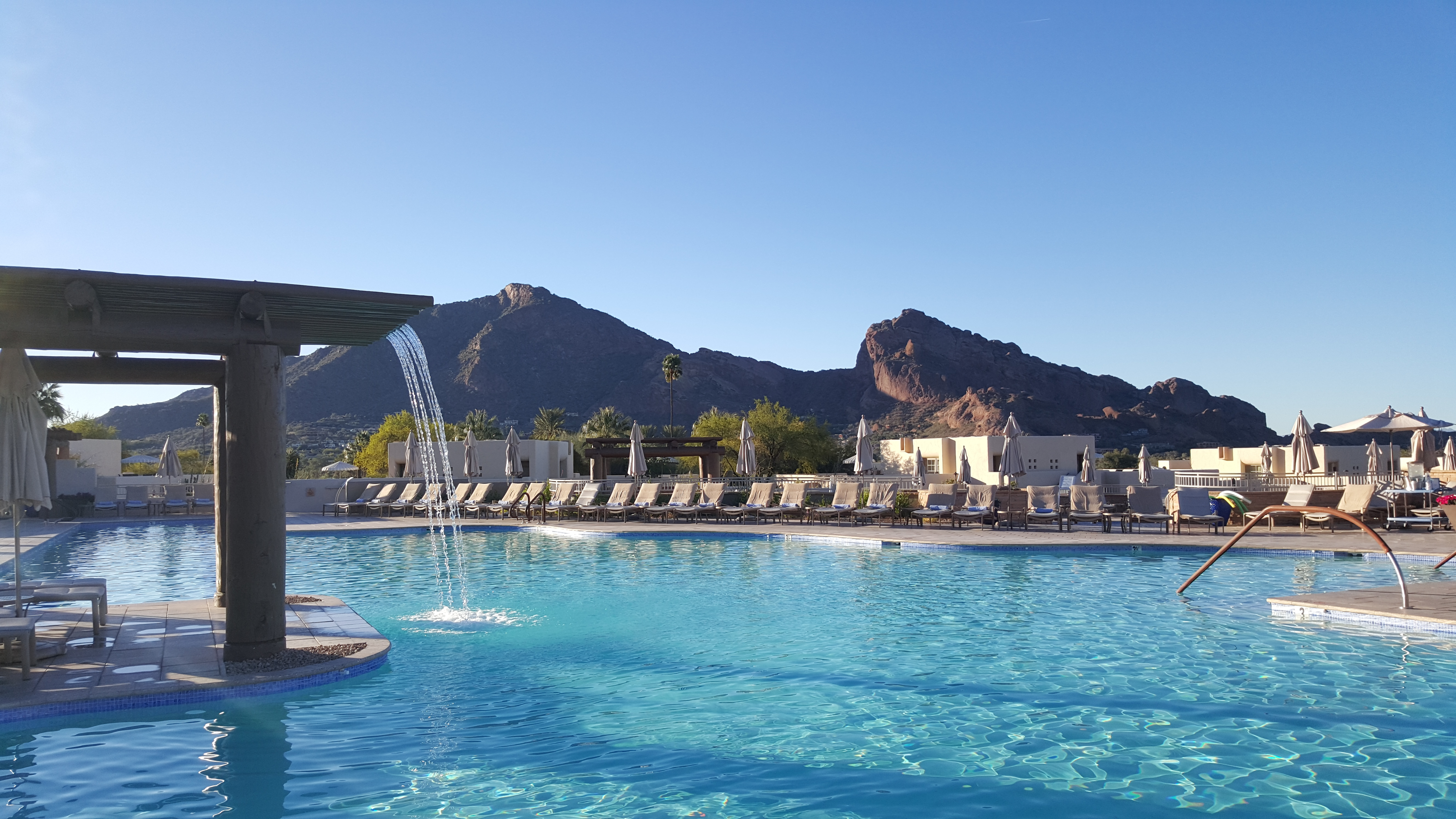
The Jackrabbit Pool at Camelback Inn

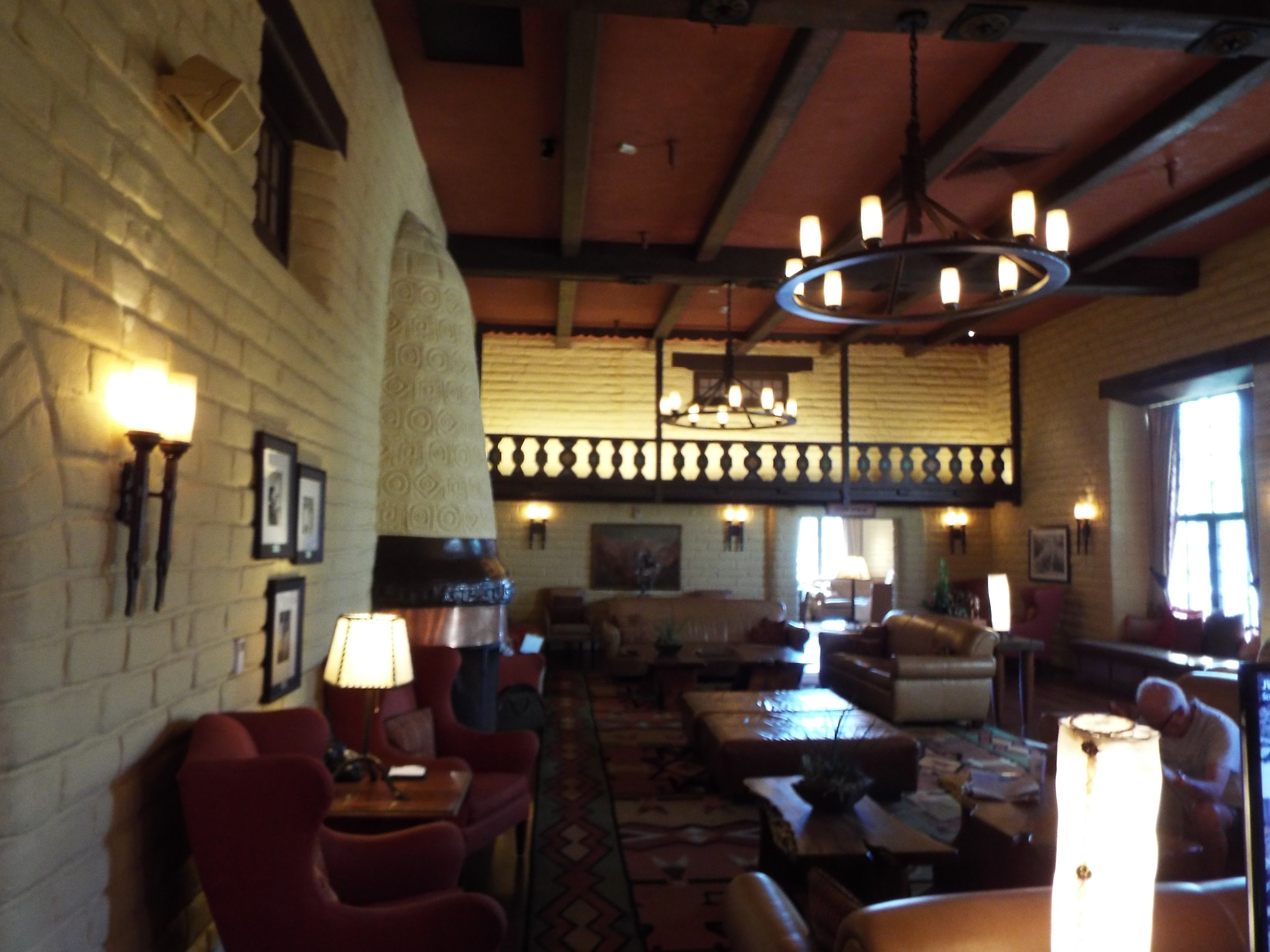
The original Rita’s Kitchen dining room.

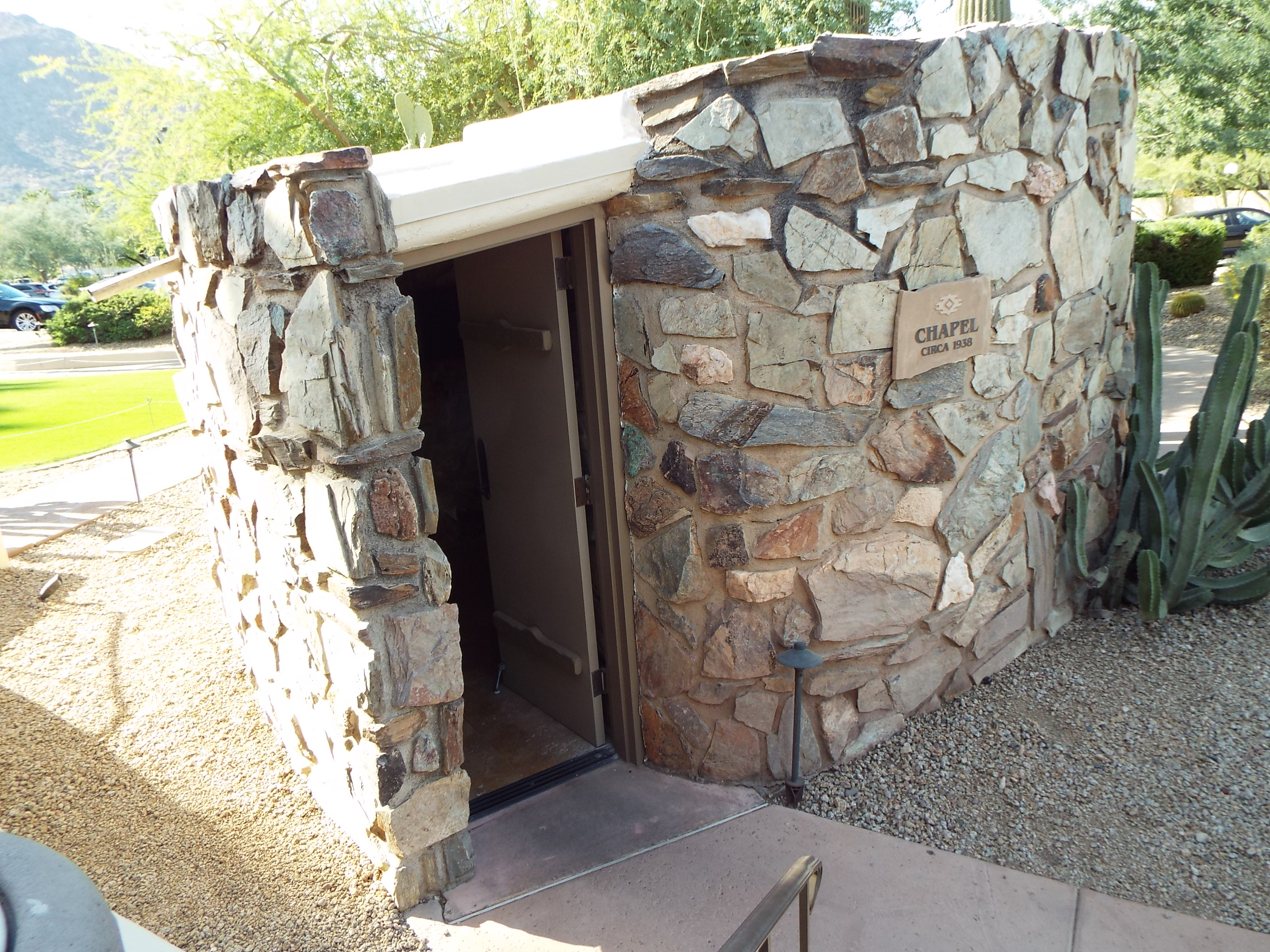
Camelback Inn Chapel built in 1936.

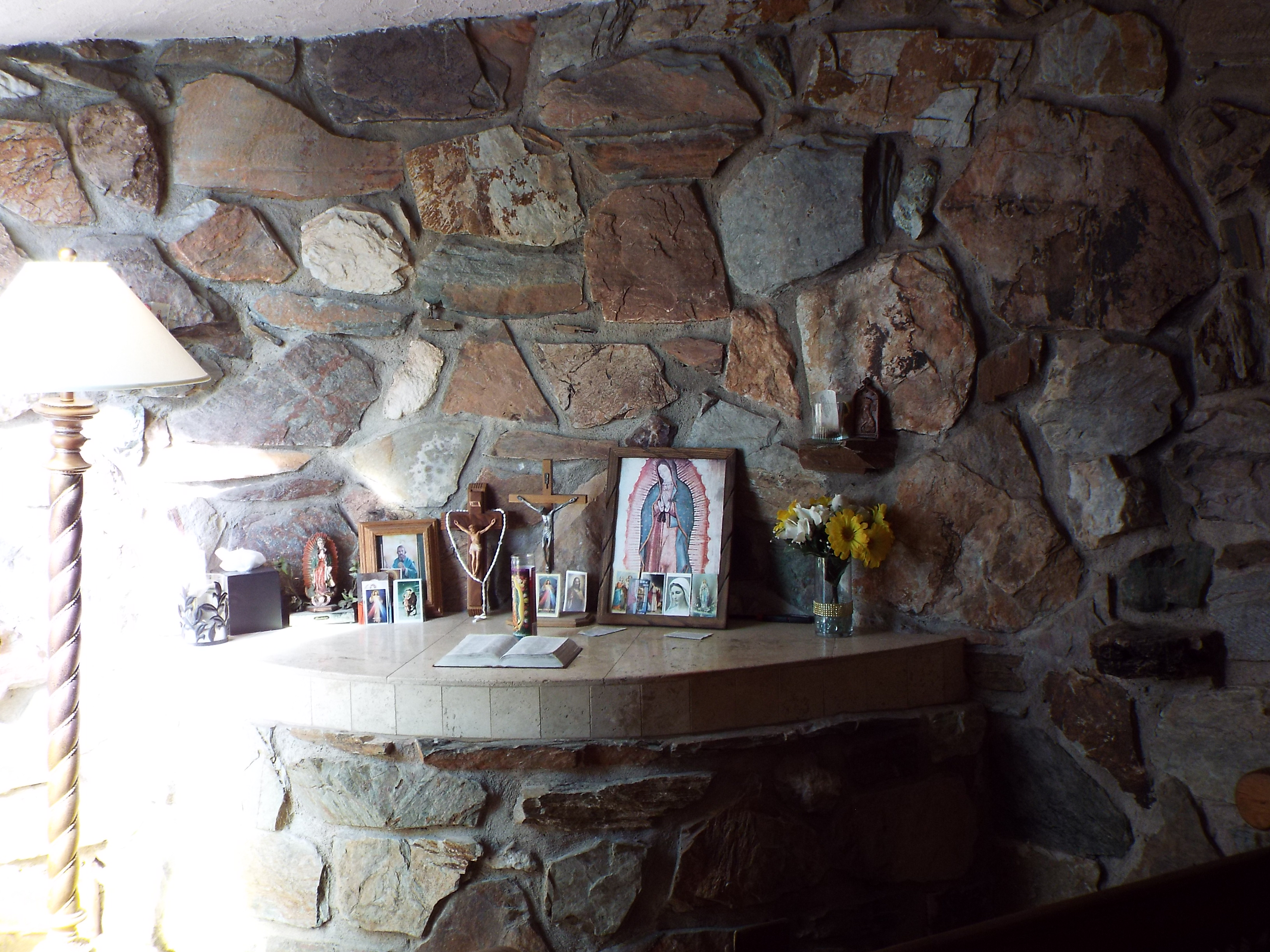
Inside the Camelback Inn Chapel.

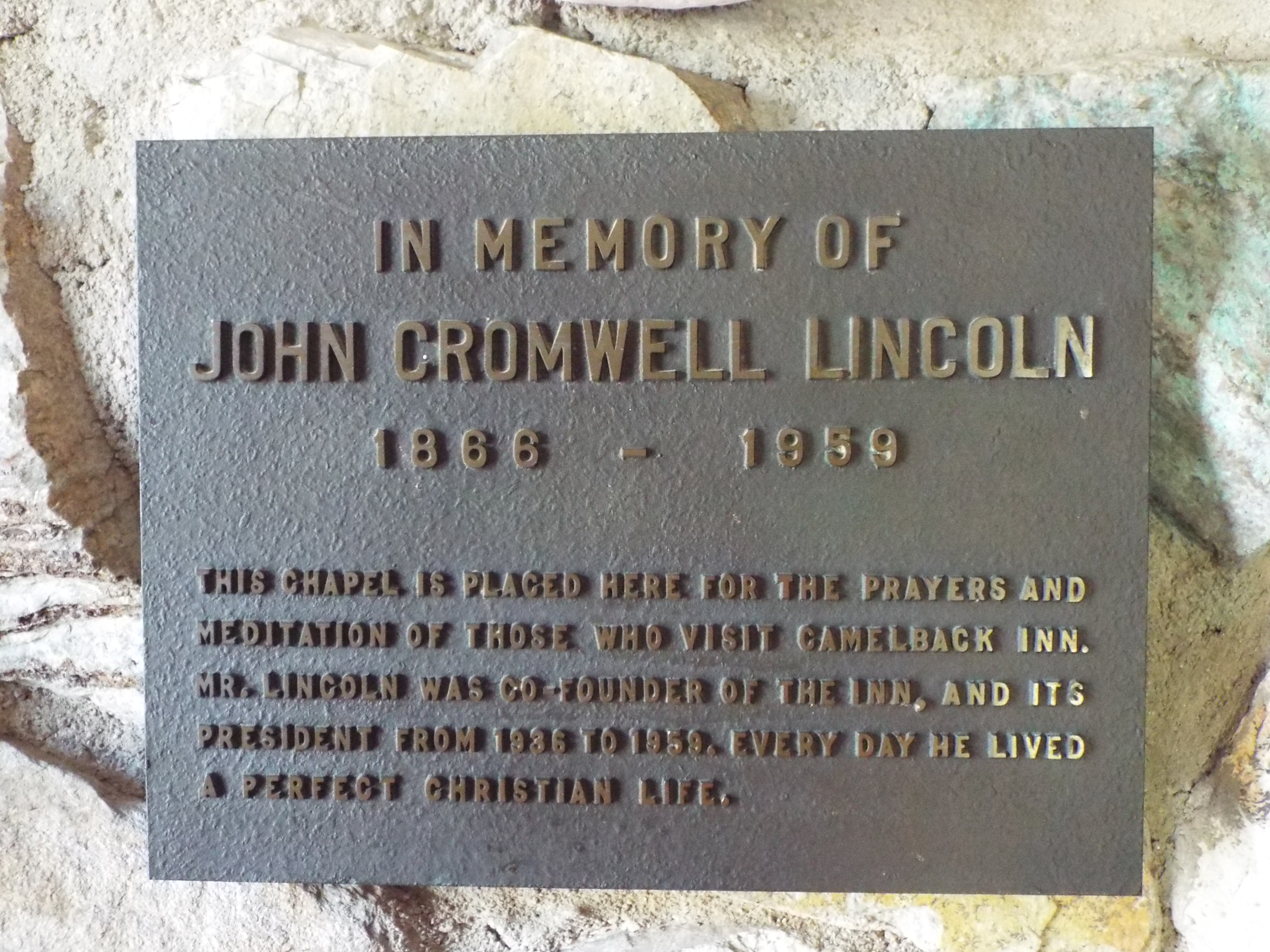
Plaque dedicated to John C. Lincoln inside the Camelback Inn Chapel.

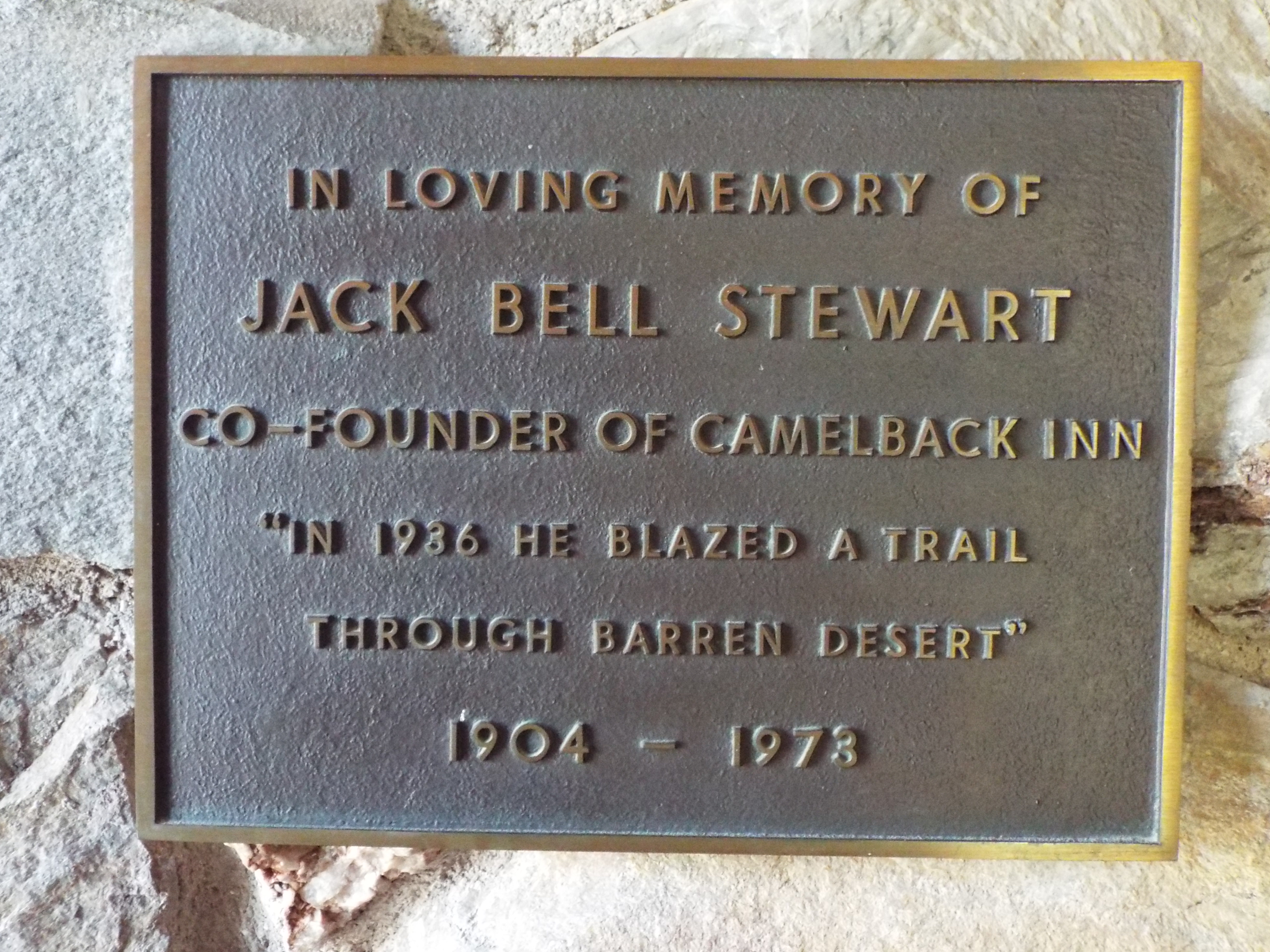
Plaque dedicated to Jack Bell Stewart, co-founder of the Camelback Inn, inside the Camelback Inn Chapel.
