= John C. Lincoln =

American inventor and businessman (1866–1959)

- John Cromwell Lincoln
- Born: John Cromwell Lincoln; July 17, 1866; Painesville, Ohio, U.S.
- Died: May 24, 1959 (aged 92); Phoenix, Arizona, U.S.
- Education: Ohio State University
- Occupations: Inventor, businessman
- Spouse(s): Myrtle H Humphrey Lincoln (?–1913); Helen Colville (?–1959)

John Cromwell Lincoln (July 17, 1866 – May 24, 1959) was an American inventor, entrepreneur, philanthropist and in 1924, the vice-presidential candidate under the Commonwealth Land Party ticket. He held 55 patents on several electrical devices, founded the Lincoln Electric Co., invested in the construction of the Camelback Inn, presided over the Bagdad Mine and funded two hospitals in Phoenix, one of which bears his name.

== Early years ==
John Cromwell Lincoln was born in Painesville, Ohio, to William Edward Lincoln (1831–1920), an abolitionist minister, and Frances Louise Marshall Lincoln (1839–1918), a physician. There he received his primary and secondary education. In 1888, he graduated from the Ohio State University with a degree in electrical engineering and soon after became a construction superintendent. He trained under Charles F. Brush, who invented the arc light and engineered America's first electric street car. In 1891, Lincoln patented his first invention, an electric brake for street-railway cars.

In 1889, Henry George visited Cleveland to speak about his ideals. George was an American political economist and journalist whose writing was immensely popular in the 19th century, and sparked several reform movements of the Progressive Era. His writings also inspired the economic philosophy known as Georgism, based on the belief that people should own the value they produce themselves, but that the economic value derived from land (including natural resources) should belong equally to all members of society. Lincoln was among those in the crowd who attended the political meeting. He was impressed with George and read George's book Progress and Poverty three times. His enthusiasm was such that he became a member of the Single Tax Georgism movement.

== The Lincoln Electric Company ==
The Lincoln Electric Company Logo

In 1895, he founded the Lincoln Electric Company in Cleveland, Ohio, with a capital investment of $200.00. Lincoln used the facilities of his company to do research and to experiment with the electrical devices which he invented. The main product of the company were electric motors of his own design. He was directly responsible for 55 patents that gained him national fame as an industrialist. Lincoln helped finance the education of his brother James F. Lincoln who joined him upon his graduation in 1907, as the sales director of the company. The product line of the company expanded and included battery chargers for electric automobiles. In 1914, James F. Lincoln headed and supervised the company as general manager. This in turn gave Lincoln the time that he needed to continue with his research, experiments and inventions. The first variable voltage, single operator, portable welding machine in the world was introduced by the Lincoln Electric Co. in 1911. Lincoln created and patented a flux. The flux made a weld as flexible as steel. The shielded arc welding process developed by Lincoln played an important role in the manufacture of merchant ships in World War II. He developed an employee bonus system in the company which made them the highest paid in the industry. As a result of this system's success, he would eventually apply it to his future ventures. In 1933, Lincoln published The Procedure Handbook of Arc Welding Design.

== Commonwealth Land Party ==
The Single Tax Party, a political party, was renamed in 1924, and became the Commonwealth Land Party. The party's logo included an image of the earth with the phrase, "The Birthright of All Mankind". New York City served as the Party headquarters with state branches in Ohio, Pennsylvania, and New Jersey.

The party platform was the following:

- That the Earth is the Birthright of All Mankind and that All have and Equal and Unalienable Right to its Use.
- That man's need for land is expressed by the rent of land; that land rent results from the presence and productive activities of the people; that it arises as the result of natural law, and that it therefore should be taken to defray public expenses.

Lincoln became a member of the Commonwealth Land Party and in 1924, was nominated by the party for vice-president with William J. Wallace, from New Jersey, running for president in the presidential elections of 1924. The Wallace and Lincoln team received 2,778 of the popular vote and 0 electoral votes in comparison with the Republican Party's candidates Calvin Coolidge and Charles G. Dawes who received 15,725,016 of the popular votes and 382 electoral votes thus, winning the presidential election.

== Sunnyslope, Arizona ==
Lincoln's first wife was Myrtle H Humphrey Lincoln. On April 4, 1892, he had a daughter with Myrtle whom they named Louise Lincoln. Myrtle died in 1913. He later met and married Helen Colville. Helen was a college graduate and former educator who taught math and science. On June 15, 1922, she gave birth to a child, whom they named Joseph Colville Lincoln. Eventually, they had two more daughters and three sons.

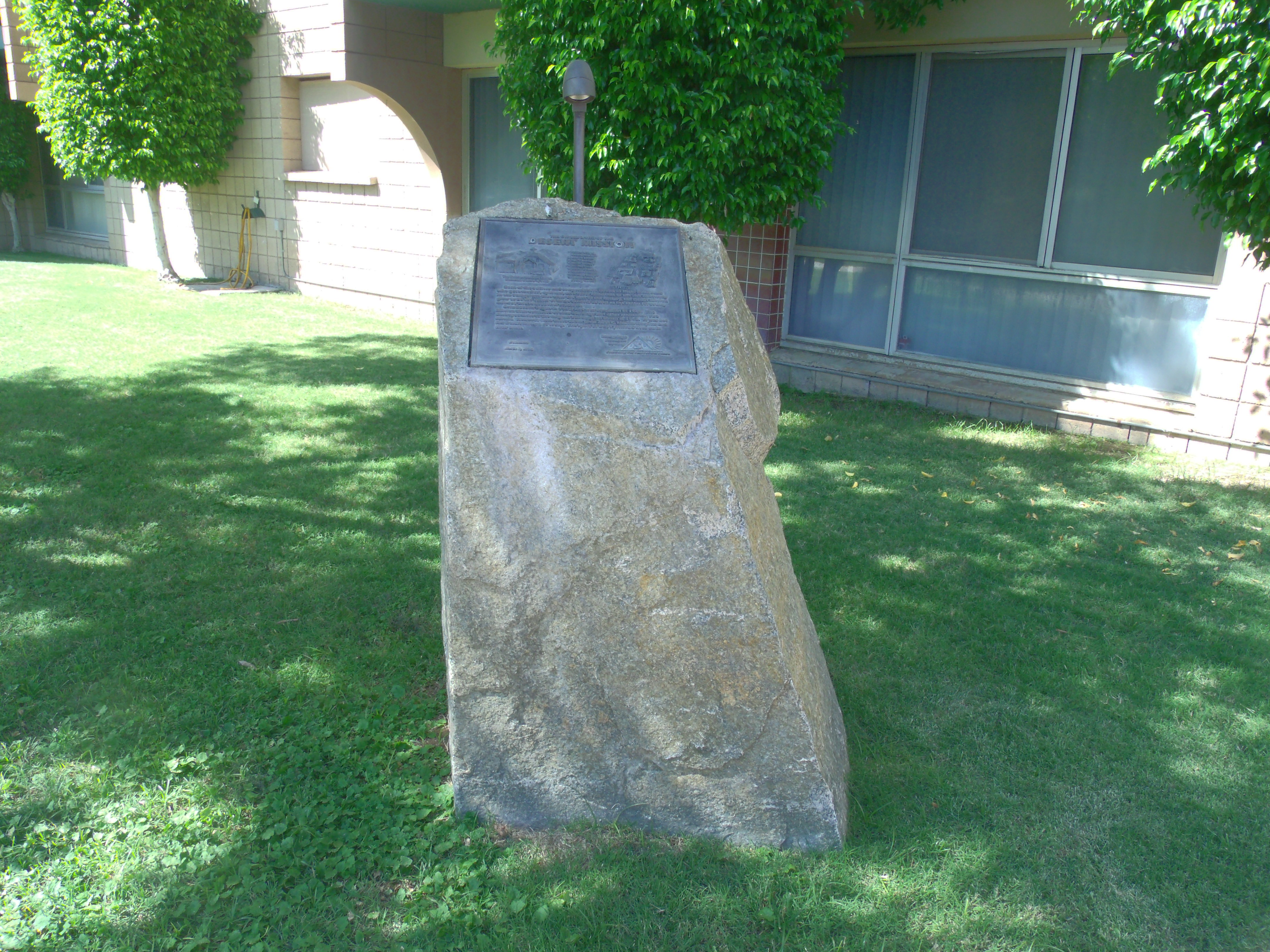
This is where the historic Desert Mission of Sunnyslope was founded. A plaque marking the historical site, commissioned by the Sunnyslope Historical Society and the John C. Lincoln Hospital, was placed on this site on March 7, 1992.

In 1931, Lincoln's wife Helen was diagnosed with tuberculosis. He learned about the Desert Mission which was founded in 1927, by Marguerite Colley and Elizabeth Beatty in Sunnyslope, Arizona. This was a facility – a comprehensive, faith-based community center – that provided for the medical, social, and religious needs of the people living in the Sunnyslope Community. He was also told that the dry air and climate in Arizona was good for those who suffered from the disease. He then decided to move, with Helen and their three children, from Cleveland to Sunnyslope for the sake of his wife's health. Within two years, Helen was again healthy and the Lincoln's started to work with the Desert Mission, the haven for the sick and poor of Sunnyslope. He promoted Phoenix as a haven for health seekers.

In 1933, the Lincolns’ made an initial donation of $2,000 which helped buy 20 acres for the Mission's expansion. This initial donation was the first of many contributions which he made to the organization which was renamed the John C. Lincoln Health Network in 1954. Helen fought and worked for the burgeoning network. Lincoln became the director of the Desert Mission of the Young Men’s Christian Association and the Good Samaritan Hospital in Arizona.

In 1936, there were approximately 600 residents in Sunnyslope. There was still much vacant land, covered with vegetation and cacti. As the Sunnyslope neighborhood grew, the medical functions of the Desert Mission became a separate entity by the 1950s, later known as the John C. Lincoln Health Network, and now known as HonorHealth, after a 2013 merger with Scottsdale Healthcare. The Desert Mission remains in operation as a subsidiary of this healthcare group.

== Camelback Inn ==
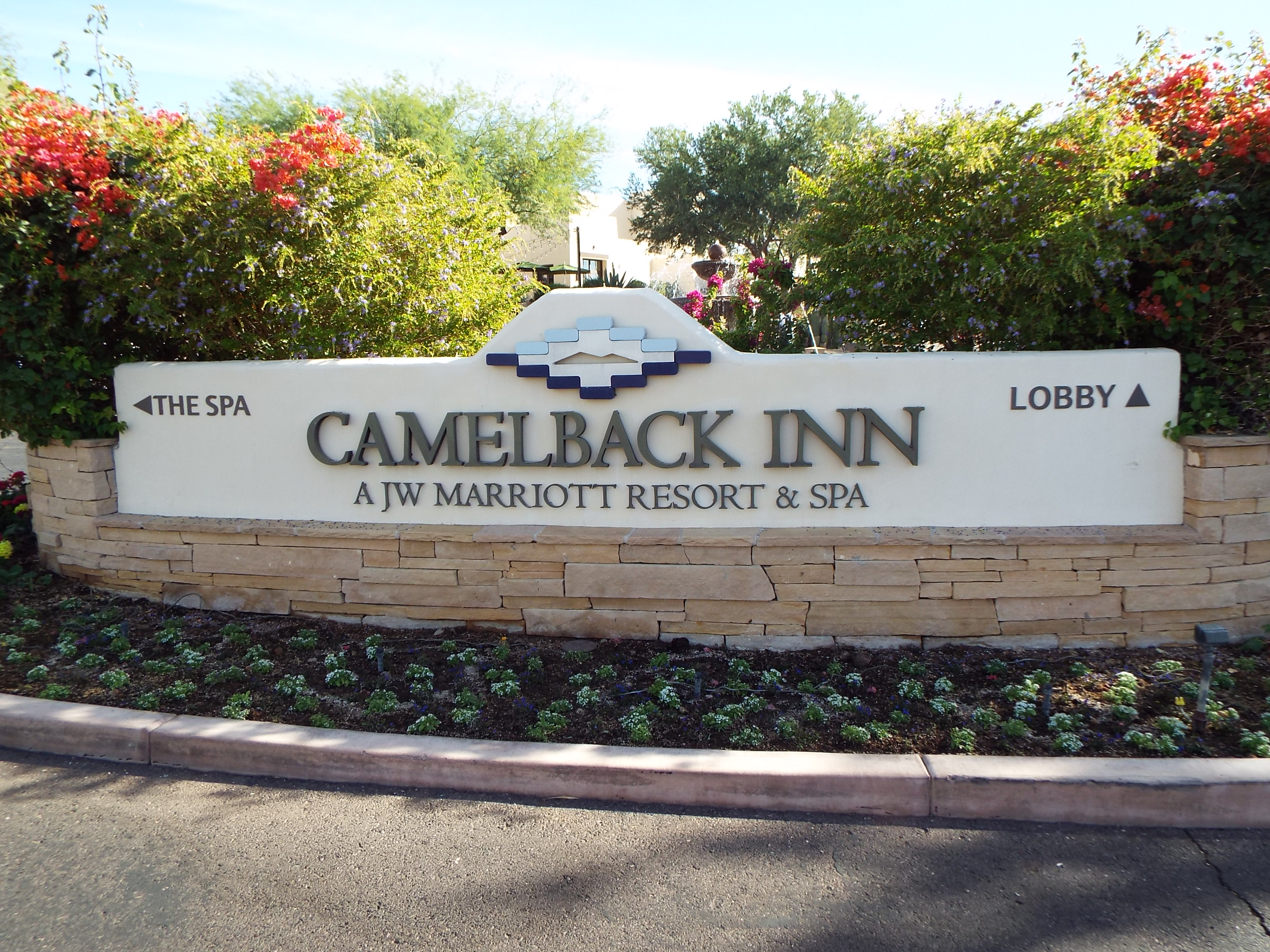
Camelback Inn entrance

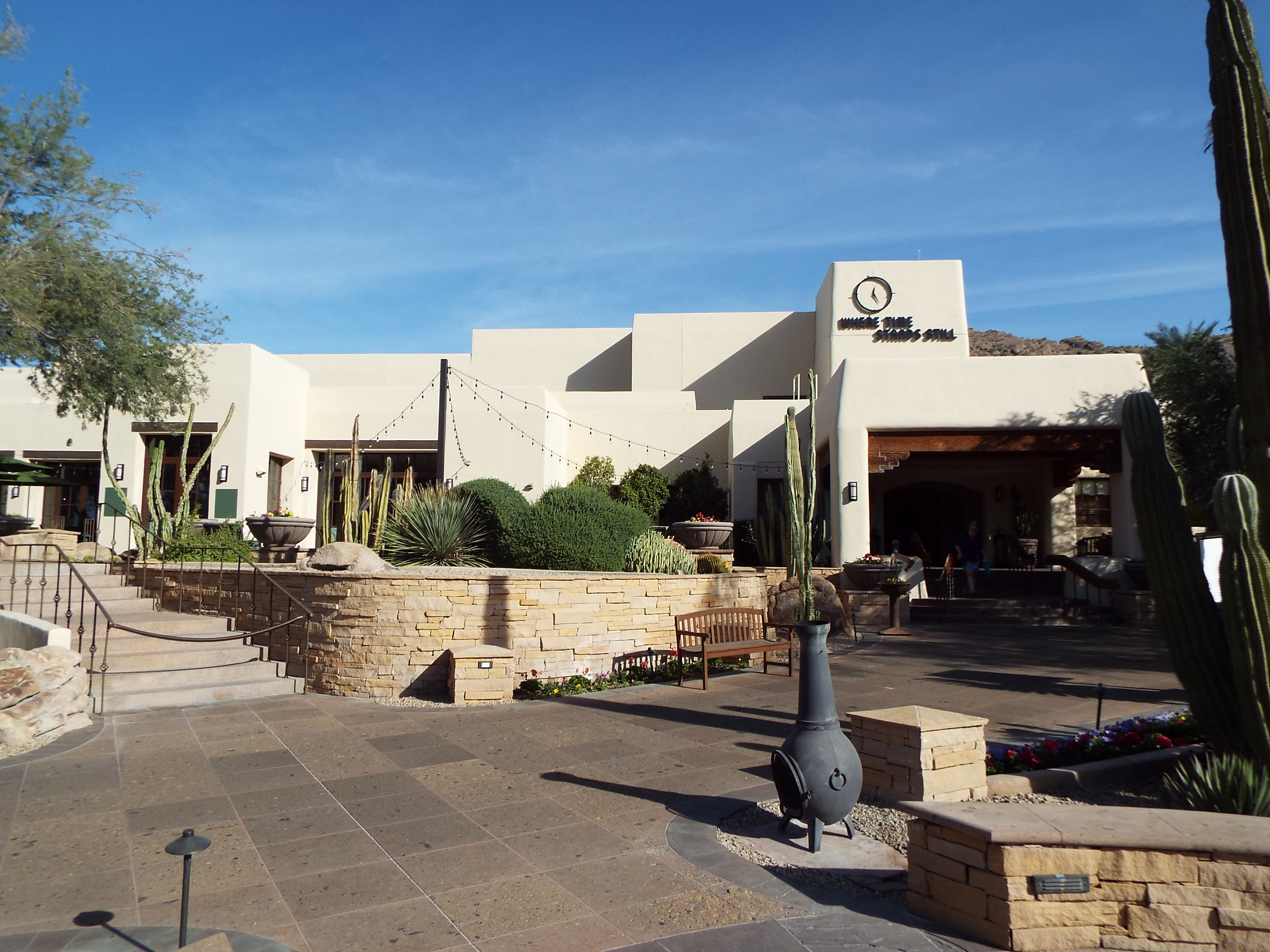
Camelback Inn

Lincoln also joined in the construction of the Camelback Inn in Paradise Valley, Arizona. Lincoln had made many investments in real estate and owned large tracts of land between the slopes of Mummy and Camelback Mountains. The property was a remote desert scrub land located 12 miles (19 km) outside Phoenix and had no water, electricity or telephone access.

Jack Stewart, a sportswriter and publicist, approached Lincoln with an idea. He wanted to build a pueblo-style hotel which could reflect Southwestern and Native American culture rather than the more commonplace dude ranch-style resort. Lincoln became convinced that the project had potential and invested $200,000 plus, the land that he owned between the Mummy and Camelback Mountains.

The Camelback Inn opened on December 15, 1936, under the management of Stewart, with the slogan "Where Time Stands Still". There were accommodations for 77 guests. Lincoln served as president of the Inn from 1936 to 1959. The resort became very popular among Hollywood celebrities and political leaders. Among the early celebrities who frequented the Inn were Mrs. Dwight D. Eisenhower, Clark Gable, Jimmy Stewart, Bette Davis, and J.W. Marriott Sr., who shared the Stewart's love for the Camelback Inn.

In 1968, the Camelback Inn was purchased by Bill Marriott of Marriott International and in March 2003, the hotel was officially renamed by its parent corporation as "Camelback Inn, a JW Marriott Resort & Spa". It is located at 5402 East Lincoln Drive.

== Universal Wire Spring Company ==
He also had a financial interest in the Universal Wire Spring Company. Among the many products he patented in the company's' name are:

- US2440001; Filing date: February 10, 1944; Publication date: April 20, 1948; Attachment for wire elements to frame structures.
- US2480667; Filing date: February 21, 1944; Publication date: August 30, 1949; Wire spring for upholstered spring structures.
- US2450876; Filing date: September 19, 1945; Publication date: October 12, 1948; Wire twisting device.

== The Bagdad Mine and Copper Company ==
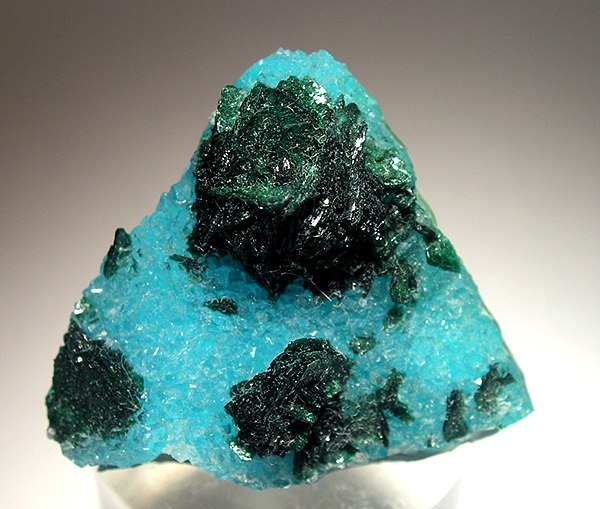
Malachite-Quartz-Chrysocolla specimen from the Bagdad Mine

The Lincoln family began to acquire Bagdad Mining stock in the latter part of World War II. By September 1944, Lincoln acquired 50% in the Bagdad Mine stock and had become the president of the Bagdad Copper Company. The Bagdad Mine represents one of the largest copper reserves in the United States and in the world, having estimated reserves of 873.6 million tonnes of ore grading 0.36% copper. It is located in Yavapai County, Arizona, just west of the unincorporated community of Bagdad. Lincoln established a laboratory in the mining area dedicated to the research of the oxide ores. He had a small pilot plant built to test the fluosolids roasting of the sulfide concentrates. Ernest Russell Dickie, who was familiar with the Vulture Mine, became Lincolns' associate. Dickie supervised its activities throughout the years of vast expansion and development.

== The Lincoln Institute of Land Policy ==
In 1946, Lincoln established the Lincoln Foundation in Phoenix. He was inspired by Henry George's ideals which in turn served as an inspiration to create the foundation. In 1966, the University of Hartford in Connecticut accepted the establishment of the foundation's John C. Lincoln Institute within its campus. Eventually, the Lincoln Institute of Land Policy established an independent school and as such became the primary grant recipient of the foundation. The Lincoln Institute of Land Policy school is located just outside of Harvard Square at 113 Brattle Street, Cambridge, Massachusetts.

== Henry George School of Social Science ==
In 1947, Lincoln became the third president of the Board of Trustees of the Henry George School of Social Science in New York upon the death of Anna George de Mille, daughter of Henry George. He served in this position until 1958. As stated in the beginning of this article Lincoln as a young man had read Progress and Poverty by Henry George and became a believer in George's ideas.

Lincoln made monetary contributions to the school as an individual. However, he received complaints from different factions about various upsets at the school. He then decided to use the Lincoln Foundation, which he created, in 1946 to channel his contributions. For a number of years, the Lincoln Foundation supported the school.

In July 1957, on the occasion of the 25th anniversary banquet of the Henry George School the school's vice president, Ezra Cohen, paid tribute to Lincoln and saluted him:

"for a lifetime of keen understanding, of signal accomplishment, and for a social conscience that expresses itself in action."

== John C. Lincoln Medical Center ==
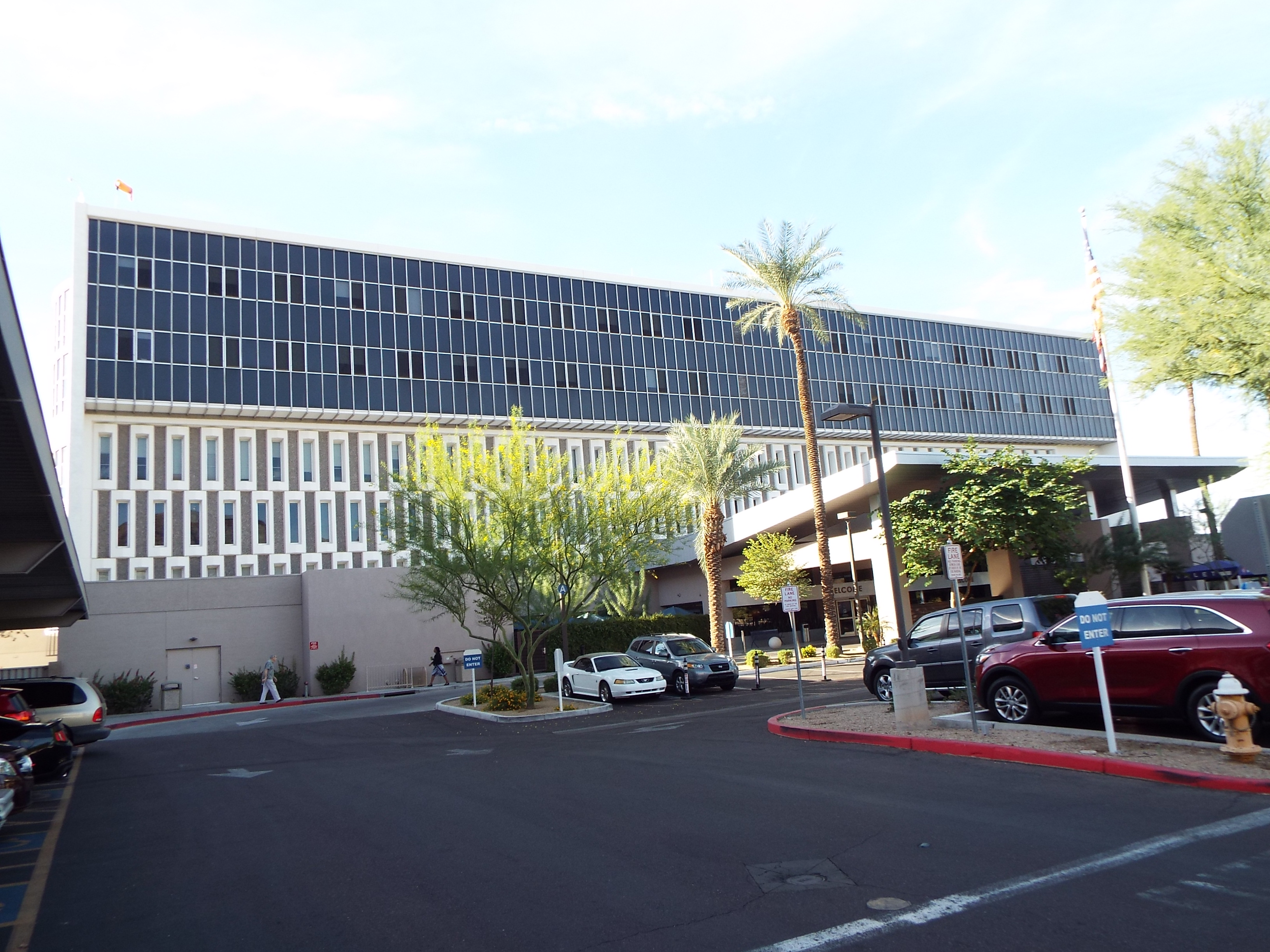
John C. Lincoln Medical Center in Sunnyslope.

Lincoln donated the money to begin construction of the John C. Lincoln Medical Center in Sunnyslope section of Phoenix and the John C. Lincoln Deer Valley Medical Center which now goes by the name of the Deer Valley Medical Center. Upon his death in 1959, Helen and his friends almost immediately began fundraising for an official hospital to commemorate his deeds. John C. Lincoln Hospital opened its doors in 1965.

John C. Lincoln Medical Center is currently a 266-bed, full-service hospital. It's a leader in robotic and scarless surgery and has extensive cardiology and heart care services with a radiation-free, 3D heart mapping system. The hospital is an American College of Surgeons-verified Level I Trauma Center, a Primary Stroke Center, and an accredited Chest Pain Center. General surgery residents are trained there.

Other services include a specialty surgery unit to care for orthopedic, urology, neurology and other surgery patients, inpatient and outpatient rehabilitation services, critical care unit, interventional radiology, and inpatient and outpatient medical imaging. The facility has earned Magnet designation, the highest national designation for excellence in nursing care, three times. The John C. Lincoln Medical Center is located at 250 E. Dunlap Ave. in the Sunnyslope section of Phoenix.

The John C Lincoln Deer Valley Hospital (now the Deer Valley Medical Center) is currently a 204-bed, full-service hospital offering extensive inpatient and outpatient general surgery and cardiac surgery and care. There is a Breast Health and Research Center on the campus which offers the latest technology, including 3D mammograms and an MRI on site. The facility has earned Magnet designation, the highest national designation for excellence in nursing care. The Deer Valley Medical Center is located at 19829 N. 27th Ave. in Phoenix.

Lincolns' descendants have all been members of the network's board of directors of the John C. Lincoln Health Network, now HonorHealth

== Later years ==
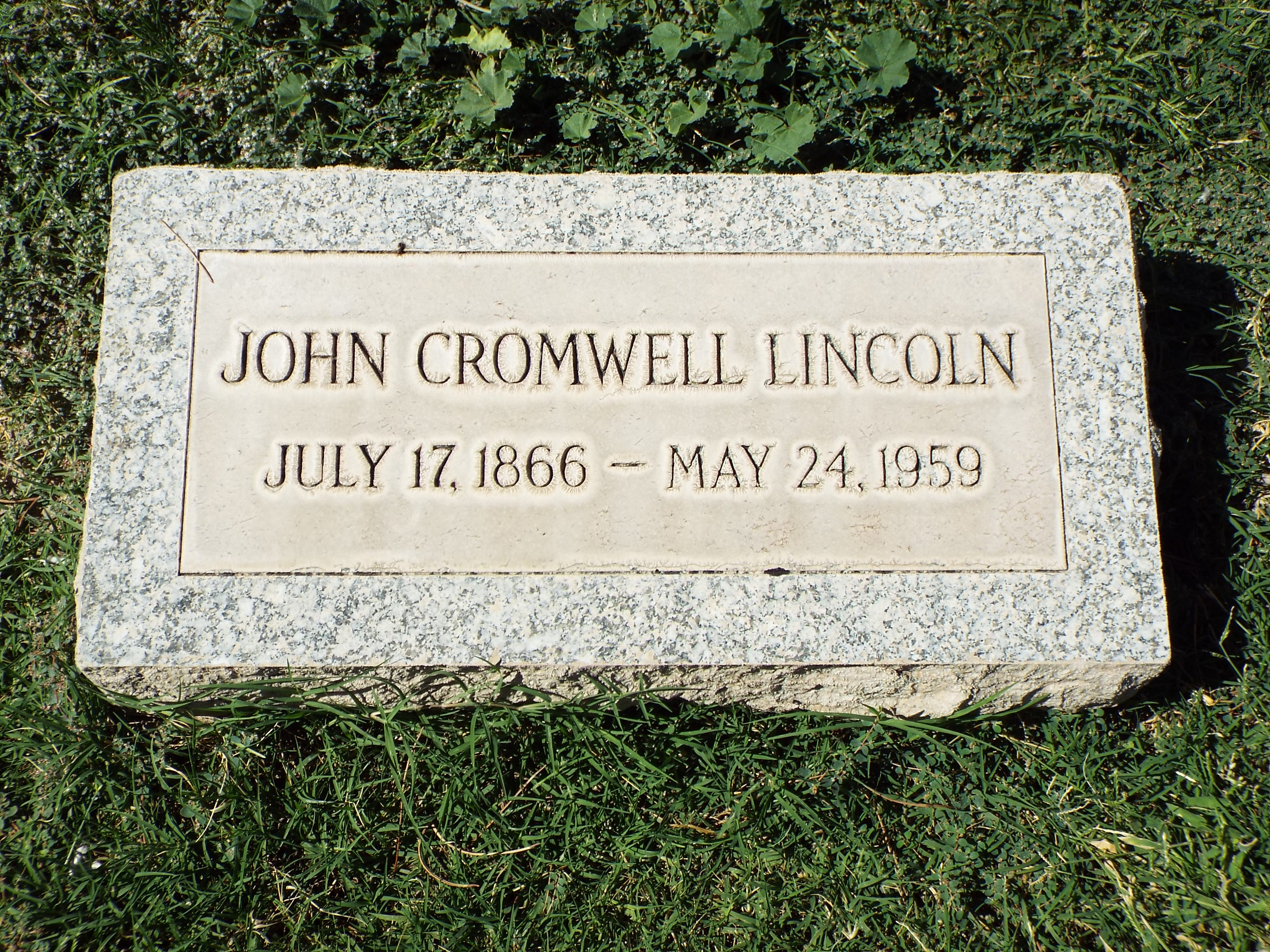
Grave-site of John C. Lincoln

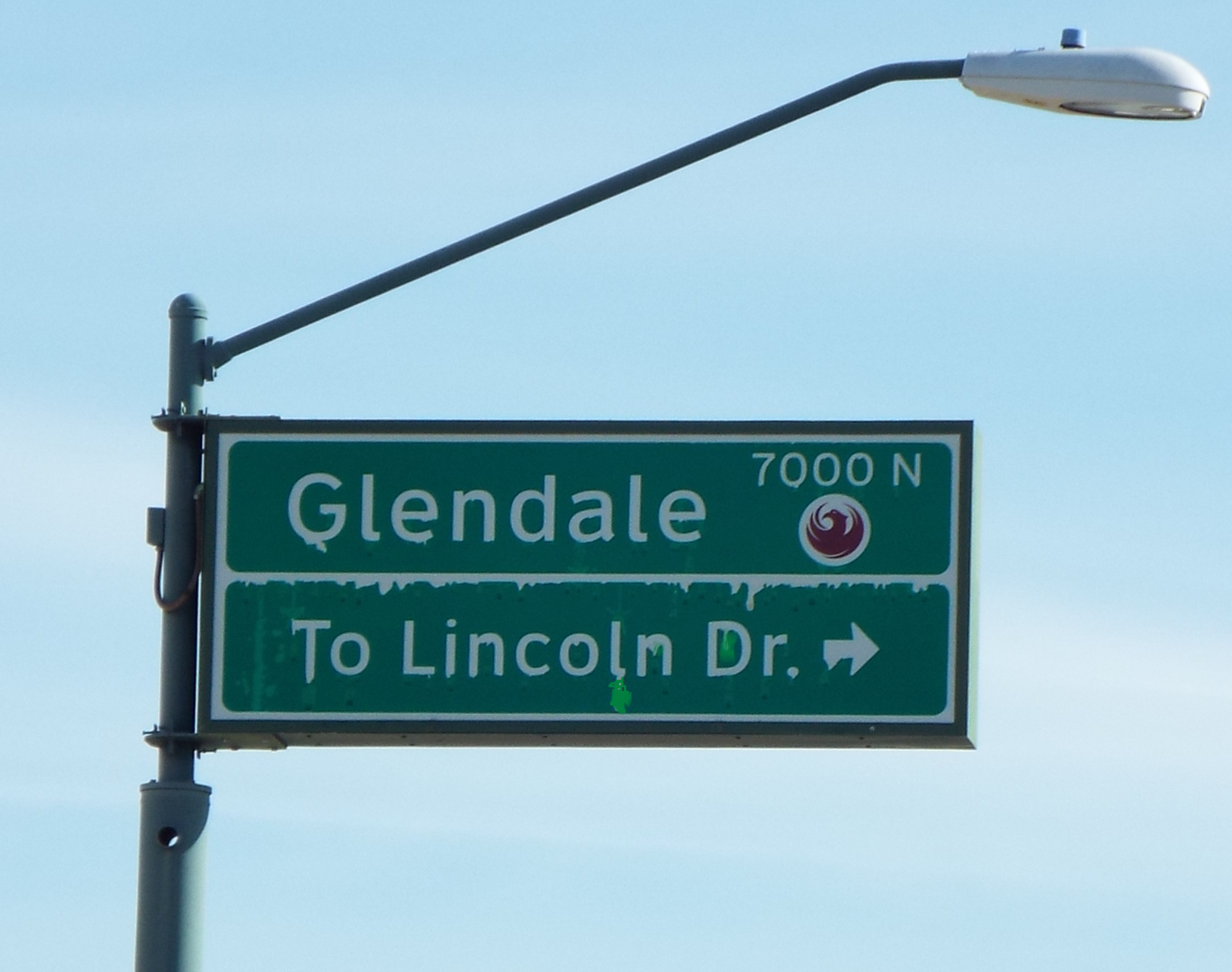
Phoenix road sign honoring Lincoln

Lincoln was experimenting with high speed crushing rolls when he died on May 24, 1959, at the age of 92. He is buried in Phoenix's Greenwood/Memory Lawn Mortuary & Cemetery. At the time of his death he was survived by Mrs. Lincoln, two daughters and three sons. Lincolns' 55th patent was awarded posthumously for a spring cushion that's still used in cars today. Lincoln Drive in Phoenix is named after him. In 1998, Lincoln was posthumously inducted into the American Mining Hall of Fame.

Lincolns' second wife, Helen lived to be 102, she died November 12, 1994, beating her prognosis by six decades. She is buried alongside her husband in Greenwood/Memory Lawn Mortuary & Cemetery.

The American Welding Society established the AWS Foundation which awards the John C. Lincoln Memorial Scholarship. The purpose of the scholarship is to provide financial assistance to those individuals interested in pursuing a career in welding engineering. The John C. Lincoln Memorial Scholarship is awarded to an undergraduate student pursuing a minimum four-year bachelor's degree in welding engineering (WE) or welding engineering technology (WET); however, priority is given to welding engineering (WE) students.

His daughter Louise Lincoln Kerr, became an accomplished musician, composer, and philanthropist. She co-founded the National Society of Arts and Letters in 1944 and the Phoenix Symphony in 1947. She was also a benefactor to the School of Music at Arizona State University. She was inducted into the Arizona Women's Hall of Fame in 2004. Louise died on December 10, 1977. Her former home and studio in Scottsdale was recognized with a listing on the National Register of Historic Places on April 14, 2010.

== Written works ==
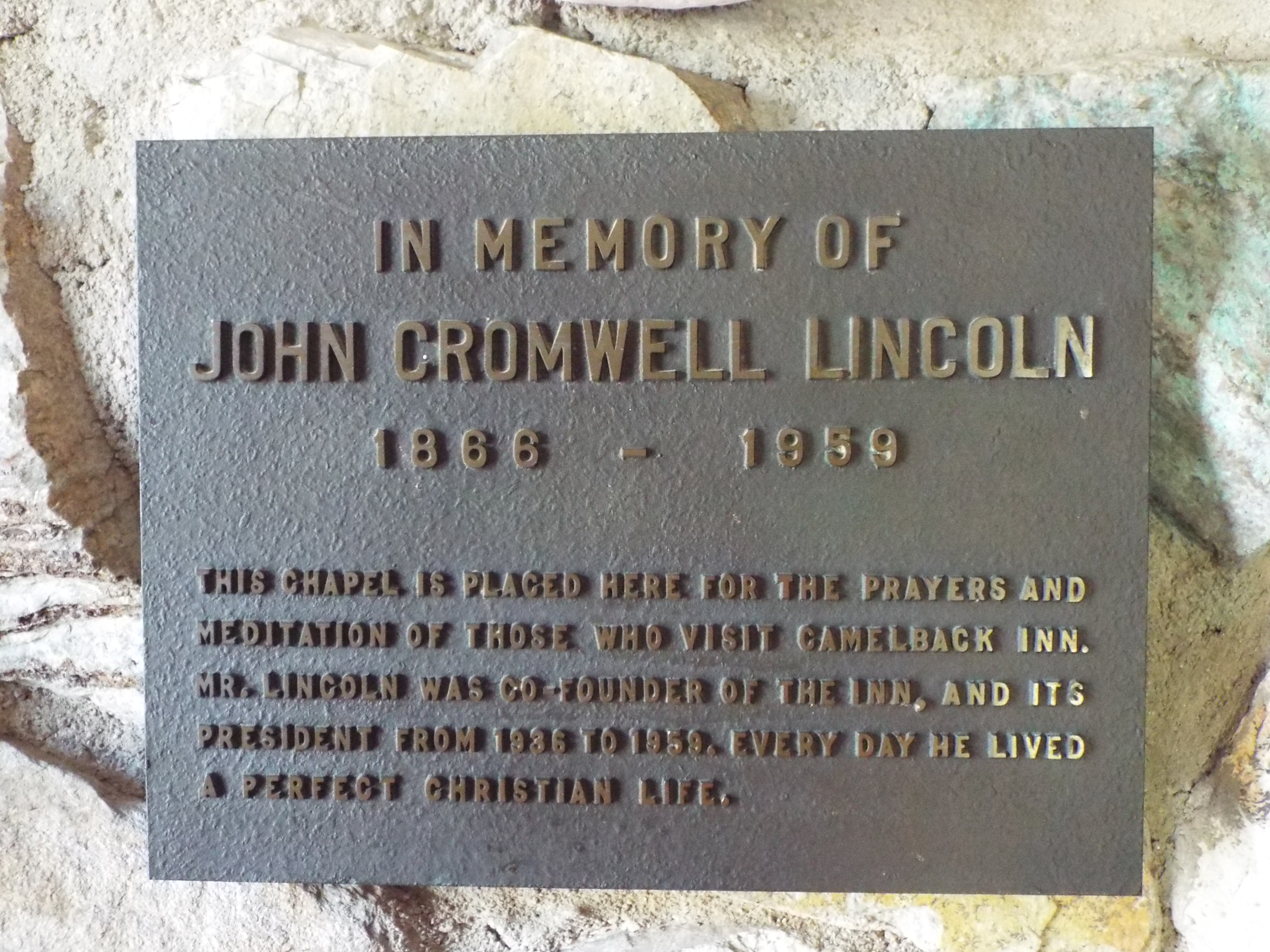
Camelback Inn plaque dedicated to the memory of Lincoln

Among Lincoln's written works are the following:

- The Procedure Handbook of Arc Welding Design
- Ground Rent, Not Taxes
- Christ's Object in Life
- Stop Legal Stealing
- Should Land Have Selling Value?
- Scientific Taxation
- The Natural Source of Revenue for the Government.

=== Publications by and about John C. Lincoln and the Lincoln Foundation ===
- John C. Lincoln, The Lincoln Letter (October 1949)*
- John C. Lincoln, The Lincoln Letter (July 1951 – June 1952)
- J.A. Wadovick, "John C. Lincoln Here on Birthday" Cleveland Plain Dealer (July 16, 1955)
- John C. Lincoln, "Stop Legal Stealing" (1958)
- "Millions for Single Tax" The Oregonian (July 20, 1959)
- George J. Harmann, "John Lincoln Bequests..." Cleveland Plain Dealer (September 20, 1959)
- William Feather, "Those Single Taxers" Cleveland Plain Dealer (March 24, 1961)
- N.R. Howard, "John C. Lincoln Left Deep Impact on Land" (Spring 1962)
- Tony Ortega, "Georgist Burns," New Times (November 2–8, 1995)
- John C. Lincoln, "Dear Friend" (undated)
- John C. Lincoln, "The Importance of Natural Relations" (undated)
- John C. Lincoln, "The Natural Source of Revenue for Government" (undated)
- John C. Lincoln, "Scientific Taxation" (undated)
- John C. Lincoln, "Should Land Having Selling Value" (undated)
- John C. Lincoln, "Some Important Axioms" (undated)

=== Publications by and about James F. Lincoln and Lincoln Electric Company ===
- James Lincoln, Intelligent Selfishness and Manufacturing (Cleveland: Lincoln Electric Company, 1943)
- "Another Lincoln Heard From" The Daily Republican Eagle (May 26, 1944)
- James F. Lincoln, et al. "Why the Lag in Production?" Town Meeting (October 2, 1946)
- James F. Lincoln, "Wages and Workers" N.A.C.A. Bulletin (May 1, 1947)
- Thomas E. Shroyer, Report of the Joint Committee on Labor-Management Relations [c. 1947]
- James F. Lincoln, What Makes Workers Work? (Cleveland: The Lincoln Electric Co., 1951)
- Howard Hall, "Graded Taxes Urged Here" The Dayton Daily News (March 7, 1962)
- Peter Edson, "Lincoln Electric Suit First Court Test of Renegotiation," World-Telegram and Sun [c. 1953]
- John W. Love, "Lincoln Electric Soon to Pay Another Bonus," World-Telegram and Sun (December 12, 1953)
- Charles Hillinger, "For the 49th year, this company pays a bonus" Philadelphia Inquirer (December 5, 1982)
- William Serrin, "The Way That Works at Lincoln" New York Times (January 15, 1984)
- "Lincoln Preaches Incentive Plans" World-Telegram and Sun (April 30, [no year])
