= Yava, Arizona =

- Populated place
- Location within the state of Arizona Yava (the United States)
- Coordinates: 34°28′19″N 112°53′26″W
- Country: United States
- State: Arizona
- County: Yavapai
- Elevation: 3,514 ft (1,071 m)
- Time zone: UTC-7 (Mountain (MST))
  - Summer (DST): UTC-7 (MST)
- Area code: 928
- FIPS code: 04-85050
- GNIS feature ID: 24697

Yava is a populated place situated in Yavapai County, Arizona, United States. It has an estimated elevation of 3,514 feet (1,071 m) above sea level. The local post office was created from a petition by the local residents in 1916, and the name of the post office was created from the first four letters of Yavapai, the name of the county, by William W. Davis, the first postmaster. The post office was closed in 1954.

Yava is located along Yavapai County Route 15, which runs east–west from Hillside to Wilhoit.

== Education ==
It is in the Hillside Elementary School District.
