= Upper Burro Creek Wilderness =

Protected area in Arizona

- IUCN category Ib (wilderness area)
- Location within the United States Location within Arizona
- Location: Mohave / Yavapai counties, Arizona, United States
- Nearest city: Bagdad, AZ
- Coordinates: 34°42′33″N 113°16′55″W
- Area: 27,440 acres (11,100 ha)
- Established: 1990
- Governing body: Bureau of Land Management

Upper Burro Creek Wilderness is a 27,440-acre (11,100 ha) wilderness area located in Yavapai and Mohave Counties in the U.S. state of Arizona, approximately 10 miles (16 km) northwest of the town of Bagdad It is managed by the Bureau of Land Management.

== Topography ==
Upper Burro Creek is one of the few perennial streams to flow undammed into Arizona's lower desert. 13 miles (21 km) of the upper portion of Burro Creek flow through the Upper Burro Creek Wilderness, which is divided into eastern and western sections by a dirt road. These thirteen miles (21 km) of Burro Creek have cut a deep channel through incised bedrock, falling about 1,500 feet (457 m) in one half-mile stretch. Away from the creek the wilderness preserves rough side canyons, and steep basalt mesas topped with desert grassland. Negro Ed Butte is a dominant feature in the area.

== Wildlife ==
Upper Burro Creek Wilderness is home to at least 150 species of birds, including a great variety of raptors. Among the mammals who inhabit the area are beaver, raccoon, desert cottontail, ring-tailed cat, badger, several species of skunk (spotted, striped, and hognosed), gray fox, javelina, bobcat, mountain lion, mule deer, and pronghorn.

== Recreation ==
Common recreational activities in Upper Burro Creek Wilderness include hiking, backpacking, camping, hunting, rock collecting, horseback riding, swimming, birdwatching, and photography. There are several access routes, for example via Six Mile Crossing on the Burro Creek, itself a diverse wildlife area.

== See also ==
- List of Arizona Wilderness Areas
- List of U.S. Wilderness Areas
- Wilderness Act
