= Bagdad mine =

Copper mine in Yavapai County, Arizona

Coordinates: 34°35′05″N 113°12′43″W

Bagdad Mine
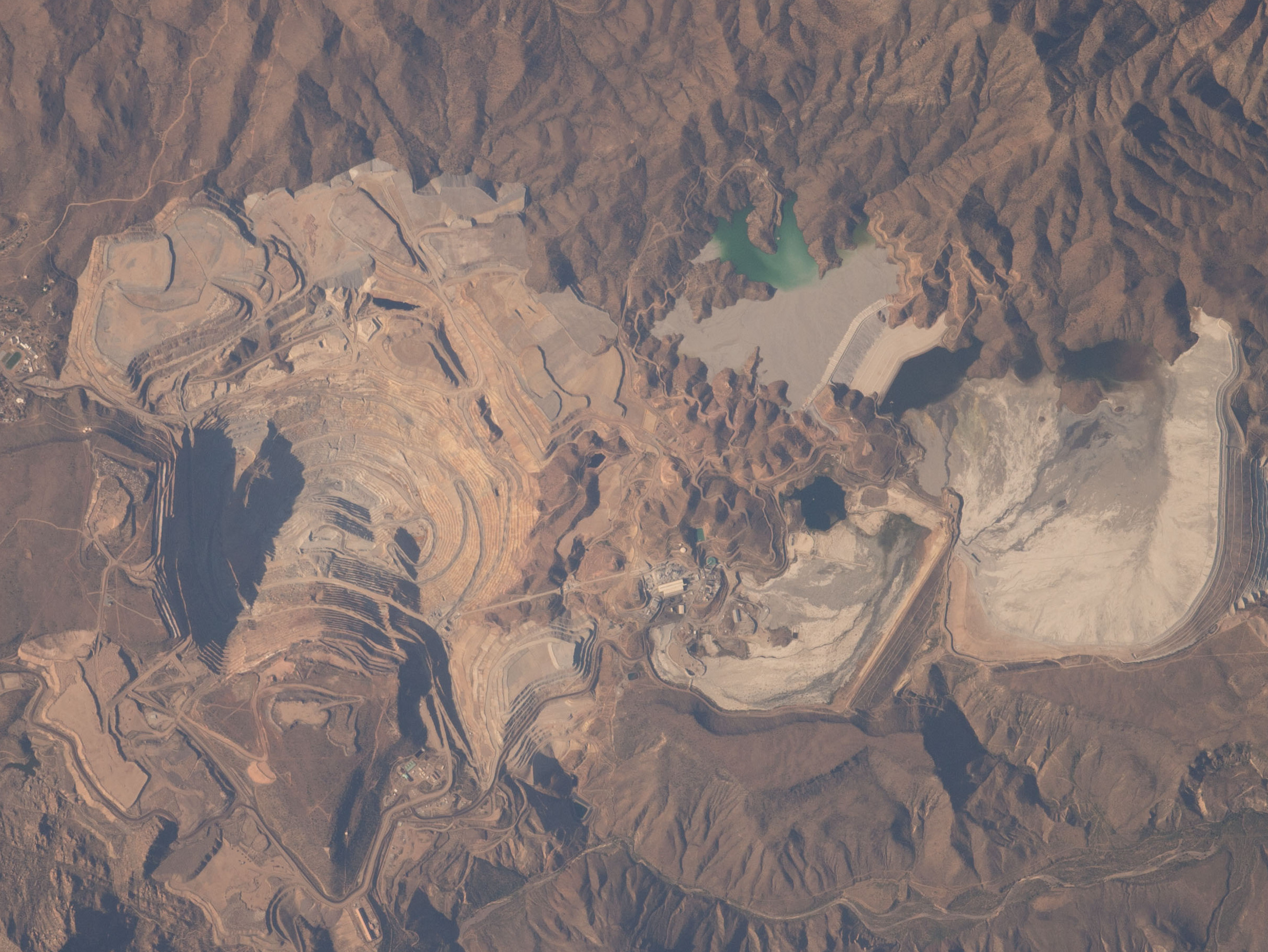
- Bagdad Mine in 2016 from the International Space Station
- Interactive map of Bagdad Mine
- Location: Yavapai County, near Bagdad, Arizona, United States
- Products: Copper, molybdenum
- Company: Freeport-McMoRan

The Bagdad Mine is a large copper mine located in Arizona, in the southwestern part of the United States. Bagdad represents one of the largest copper reserves in the United States and in the world, having estimated reserves of 873.6 million tonnes of ore grading 0.36% copper. It is located in Yavapai County, Arizona, just west of the company town of Bagdad. It is currently owned by Freeport-McMoRan. Copper is produced from chalcopyrite and molybdenum from molybdenite. Copper oxides include chrysocolla, malachite and azurite. The mine's concentrator has a capacity of 75,000 metric tons per day using stockpile leaching, with pressure leaching for molybdenum.

Copper was first mined at the site in 1882. The town of Bagdad, Arizona was built as a company town to house mine workers.

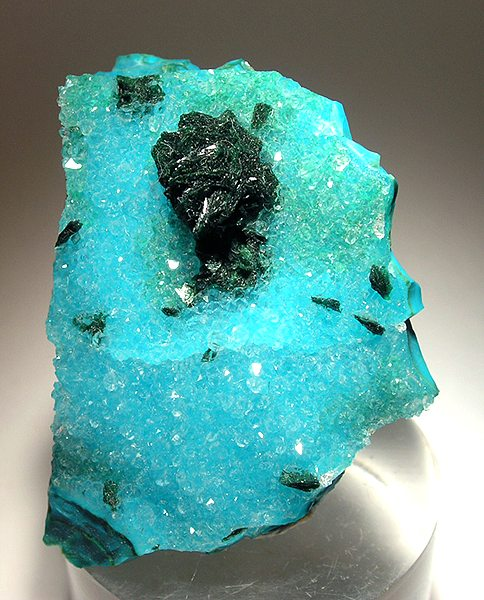
Malachite on quartz-chrysocolla from Bagdad Mine

Copper production at Bagdad was 177 million pounds in 2016 and 173 million pounds in 2017, when nearly 900 people were employed there.
