= List of places in Arizona (K) =

This is a list of cities, towns, unincorporated communities, counties, and other places in the U.S. state of Arizona, which start with the letter K. This list is derived from the Geographic Names Information System, which has numerous errors, so it also includes many ghost towns and historical places that are not necessarily communities or actual populated places. This list also includes information on the number and names of counties in which the place lies, its lower and upper ZIP code bounds, if applicable, its U.S. Geological Survey (USGS) reference number(s) (called the GNIS), class as designated by the USGS, and incorporated community located in (if applicable).

== K ==
Name of place	Number of counties	Principal county	GNIS #(s)	Class	Located in	ZIP code	
Name of place	Number of counties	Principal county	GNIS #(s)	Class	Located in	Lower	Upper
Kachina Village	1	Coconino County	2408458	CDP			
Kahachi Miliuk	1	Pima County	24474	Populated Place			
Kaibab	1	Mohave County	2408459	CDP		86022	
Kaibab Indian Reservation	2	Mohave County	23994	Civil (Indian reservation)		86022	
Kaibito	1	Coconino County	2408460	CDP			
Kaihon Kug	1	Pima County	6588	Populated Place		85634	
Kaka	1	Maricopa County	2582804	CDP		85634	
Kansas Settlement	1	Cochise County	24476	Populated Place		85643	
Katherine	1	Mohave County	2582805	CDP		86430	
Kawaika-A	1	Navajo County	42872	Populated Place			
Kayenta	1	Navajo County	2408461	CDP		86033	
Keams Canyon	1	Navajo County	2408463	CDP		86034	
Kearny	1	Pinal County	2412819	Civil (Town)		85237	
Kelvin	1	Pinal County	24477	Populated Place		85237	
Kingman	1	Mohave County	2411547	Civil (City)		86401	
Kinlichee	1	Apache County	25267	Populated Place		86505	
Kino Springs	1	Santa Cruz County	2582806	CDP			
Kirkland	1	Yavapai County	30787	Populated Place		86332	
Kirkland Junction	1	Yavapai County	6721	Populated Place		86332	
Klagetoh	1	Apache County	2582807	CDP		86505	
Klondyke	1	Graham County	42873	Populated Place		85643	
Kofa	1	Yuma County	24482	Populated Place		85369	
Kohatk	1	Pinal County	2582808	CDP		85634	
Kohls Ranch	1	Gila County	2582809	CDP			
Komak Wuacho	1	Pima County	24484	Populated Place			
Komatke	1	Maricopa County	2582810	CDP		85339	
Kom Kug	1	Pima County	30809	Populated Place			
Kom Vo	1	Pima County	6765	Populated Place			
Ko Vaya	1	Pima County	2582811	CDP		85634	
Kuakatch	1	Pima County	6776	Populated Place			
Kui Tatk	1	Pima County	24486	Populated Place			
Kuit Vaya	1	Pima County	24487	Populated Place			
Kupk	1	Pima County	24488	Populated Place			
Kykotsmovi	1	Navajo County	25471	Populated Place	Kykotsmovi Village		
Kykotsmovi Village	1	Navajo County	2408499	CDP		86039	
