= List of places in Arizona (G) =

This is a list of cities, towns, unincorporated communities, counties, and other places in the U.S. state of Arizona, which start with the letter G. This list is derived from the Geographic Names Information System, which has numerous errors, so it also includes many ghost towns and historical places that are not necessarily communities or actual populated places. This list also includes information on the number and names of counties in which the place lies, its lower and upper ZIP code bounds, if applicable, its U.S. Geological Survey (USGS) reference number(s) (called the GNIS), class as designated by the USGS, and incorporated community located in (if applicable).

== G ==
Name of place	Number of counties	Principal county	GNIS #(s)	Class	Located in	ZIP code	
Name of place	Number of counties	Principal county	GNIS #(s)	Class	Located in	Lower	Upper
Gadsden	1	Yuma County	2408271	CDP		85336	
Galeyville	1	Cochise County	24426	Populated Place			
Ganado	1	Apache County	2408273	CDP		86505	
Geronimo	1	Graham County	24428	Populated Place		85536	
Geronimo Estates	1	Gila County	2582789	CDP			
Gila Bend	1	Maricopa County	2412681	Civil (Town)		85337	
Gila Crossing	1	Maricopa County	2612138	CDP		85339	
Gila River Indian Reservation	2	Pinal County	23998	Civil (Indian Reservation)		85247	
Gilbert	1	Maricopa County	2412682	Civil (Town)		85234	
Gillespie	1	Maricopa County	24430	Populated Place			
Gillett	1	Yavapai County	24431	Populated Place			
Gisela	1	Gila County	2408295	CDP		85541	
Gleeson	1	Cochise County	5054	Populated Place		85610	
Glenbar	1	Graham County	5058	Populated Place			
Glendale	1	Maricopa County	2410596	Civil (City)		85301	85318
Glen Ilah	1	Yavapai County	5057	Populated Place	Yarnell	85362	
Glen Oaks	1	Yavapai County	29339	Populated Place			
Globe	1	Gila County	2410606	Civil (City)		85501	
Gold Camp	1	Pinal County	1853159	Populated Place	Queen Valley		
Gold Canyon	1	Pinal County	2408303	CDP		85219	
Golden Shores	1	Mohave County	2582790	CDP		86436	
Golden Valley	1	Mohave County	2408307	CDP		86401	
Goodwin	1	Yavapai County	29416	Populated Place			
Goodyear	1	Maricopa County	2410622	Civil (City)		85338	
Goodyear Village	1	Pinal County	2612139	CDP		86340	
Graham	1	Graham County	25298	Populated Place		85552	
Grand Canyon Village	1	Coconino County	2408314	CDP			
Grand Canyon West	1	Mohave County	2582791	CDP			
Grapevine	1	Gila County	29504	Populated Place			
Grasshopper	1	Navajo County	24436	Populated Place			
Grasshopper Junction	1	Mohave County	24437	Populated Place			
Gray Mountain	1	Coconino County	5319	Populated Place		86001	
Greasewood	1	Navajo County	2408325	CDP			
Greaterville	1	Pima County	29567	Populated Place			
Green Valley	1	Pima County	2408329	CDP		85614	
Greenwood	1	Mohave County	24438	Populated Place			
Greer	1	Apache County	2582792	CDP		85927	
Groom Creek	1	Yavapai County	29613	Populated Place		86303	
Growler	1	Yuma County	24442	Populated Place			
Guadalupe	1	Maricopa County	2412713	Civil (Town)		85283	
Gu Chuapo	1	Pima County	24443	Populated Place			
Gu Oidak	1	Pima County	2582793	CDP		85634	
Gurli Put Vo	1	Pima County	24444	Populated Place			
Guthrie	1	Greenlee County	24445	Populated Place		85533	
Gu Vo	1	Pima County	5412	Populated Place		85634	
