= Astragalus arizonicus =

Scientific classification
- Kingdom: Plantae
- Clade: Embryophytes
- Clade: Tracheophytes
- Clade: Spermatophytes
- Clade: Angiosperms
- Clade: Eudicots
- Clade: Rosids
- Order: Fabales
- Family: Fabaceae
- Subfamily: Faboideae
- Genus: Astragalus
- Species: A. arizonicus

Binomial name
- Astragalus arizonicus A.Gray
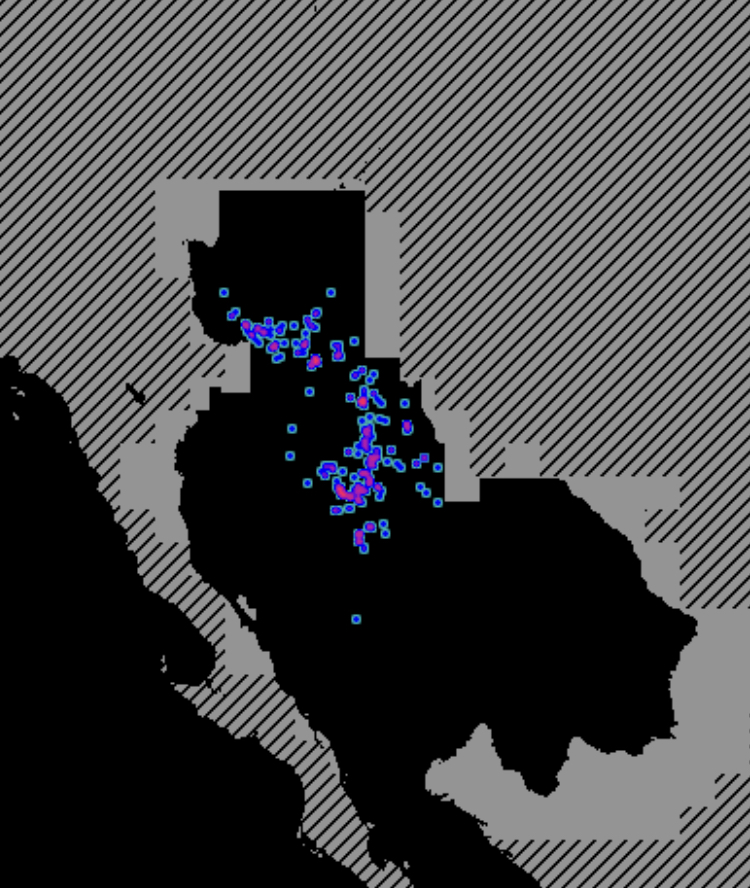
- The range of Astragalus arizonicus

Species of legume

Astragalus arizonicus is a species of milkvetch in the family Fabaceae. It is native to Arizona and New Mexico.

== Description ==
It is a diffuse plant that is usually slender. It is a perennial plant, but does not live that long. It sometimes flowers in its first season. In early spring, it has pink and purple flowers. Later in the season, it losses its flowers and becomes more untidy.

It is most commonly found in the months of March, April, and May. It was mostly found in the United States, but some were also found in North Mexico.

== Distribution and habitat ==
It has a global rank of G4, which means that it is not endangered. Although, this has not been updated since 1991. It can be found on stony hillsides, alluvial fans, washes, and canyon beds.

It can quite commonly be found in the foothills around and within the upper Gila River Basin, and it can be found from the head of the Hassayampa to the Salt and San Pedro Rivers.
