= Kui Tatk, Arizona =

- Populated place
- Location within the state of Arizona Kui Tatk (the United States)
- Coordinates: 32°02′18″N 112°04′52″W
- Country: United States
- State: Arizona
- County: Pima
- Elevation: 2,044 ft (623 m)
- Time zone: UTC-7 (Mountain (MST))
  - Summer (DST): UTC-7 (MST)
- Area code: 520
- FIPS code: 04-39010
- GNIS feature ID: 24486

Kui Tatk is a populated place located on the Tohono O'odham Indian Reservation in Pima County, Arizona, United States. It has an estimated elevation of 2,044 feet (623 m) above sea level. Its name means "mesquite root" in the Tohono O'odham language. Historically, it has also been known by the variant, Kvitatk. It has also incorrectly been identified as Iron Pipe (translated into the O'odham as Vainom Kug), which is the name of a village which sprang up around a steam pump built by miners about a mile away. The name, and its current spelling, were reached as a decision by the Board on Geographic Names in 1941. The original Indian settlement was abandoned in the 1850s, when its inhabitants migrated to different locations such as Gu Oidak, Pan Tak, and Gu Chuapo.
