= Kirkland Elementary School =

Kirkland Elementary School may refer to:

- Kirkland Elementary School - Kirkland, Arizona - Kirkland Elementary School District
- D. D. Kirkland Elementary School - Oklahoma City, Oklahoma - Putnam City Schools
