= Walnut Grove, Arizona =

- Populated place
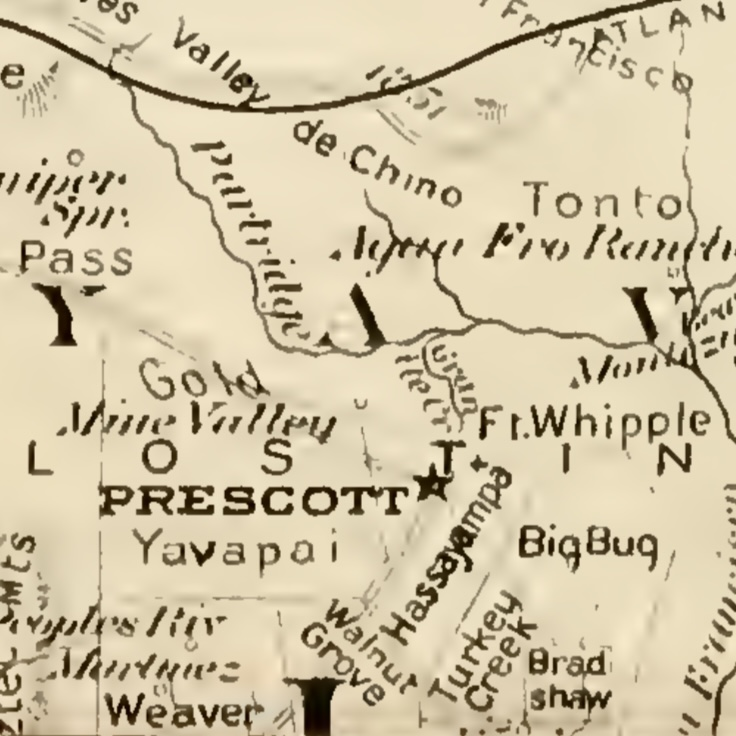
- Walnut Grove in Arizona Territory circa 1877

- Location within the state of Arizona Walnut Grove (the United States)
- Coordinates: 34°16′59″N 112°32′55″W
- Country: United States
- State: Arizona
- County: Yavapai
- Elevation: 3,668 ft (1,118 m)
- Time zone: UTC-7 (Mountain (MST))
- Area code: 928
- FIPS code: 04-80850
- GNIS feature ID: 35860

Walnut Grove is an archaic placename in Yavapai County, Arizona, United States.

When Prescott was selected as capital of the Arizona Territory in 1864, an amendment to select Walnut Grove as the capital instead failed on a 9-8 vote, as did votes to locate the capital at La Paz or a new proposed town to be called Aztlan.

The Walnut Grove mining district was defined in 1864 and named after the Walnut Grove settlement.

A Wheeler Survey party came through in October 1871, and stated "At Walnut Grove is a settlement where we found well cultivated lands." A post office was established in 1874. The settlement of Walnut Grove is reference several times in Arizona as it is; or, The coming country (1877) by Hiram C. Hodge. The failure of the Walnut Grove Dam in 1890 killed over 100.

The Walnut Grove Elementary School District was founded to serve the community around 1875. A one-room schoolhouse operated into the 1980s. The district was disestablished due to lack of students in 2021. Walnut Grove is now in Kirkland Elementary School District. As of 1976 the Prescott Unified School District takes secondary students from the district, as it is required to under law. The Prescott district operates Prescott High School.

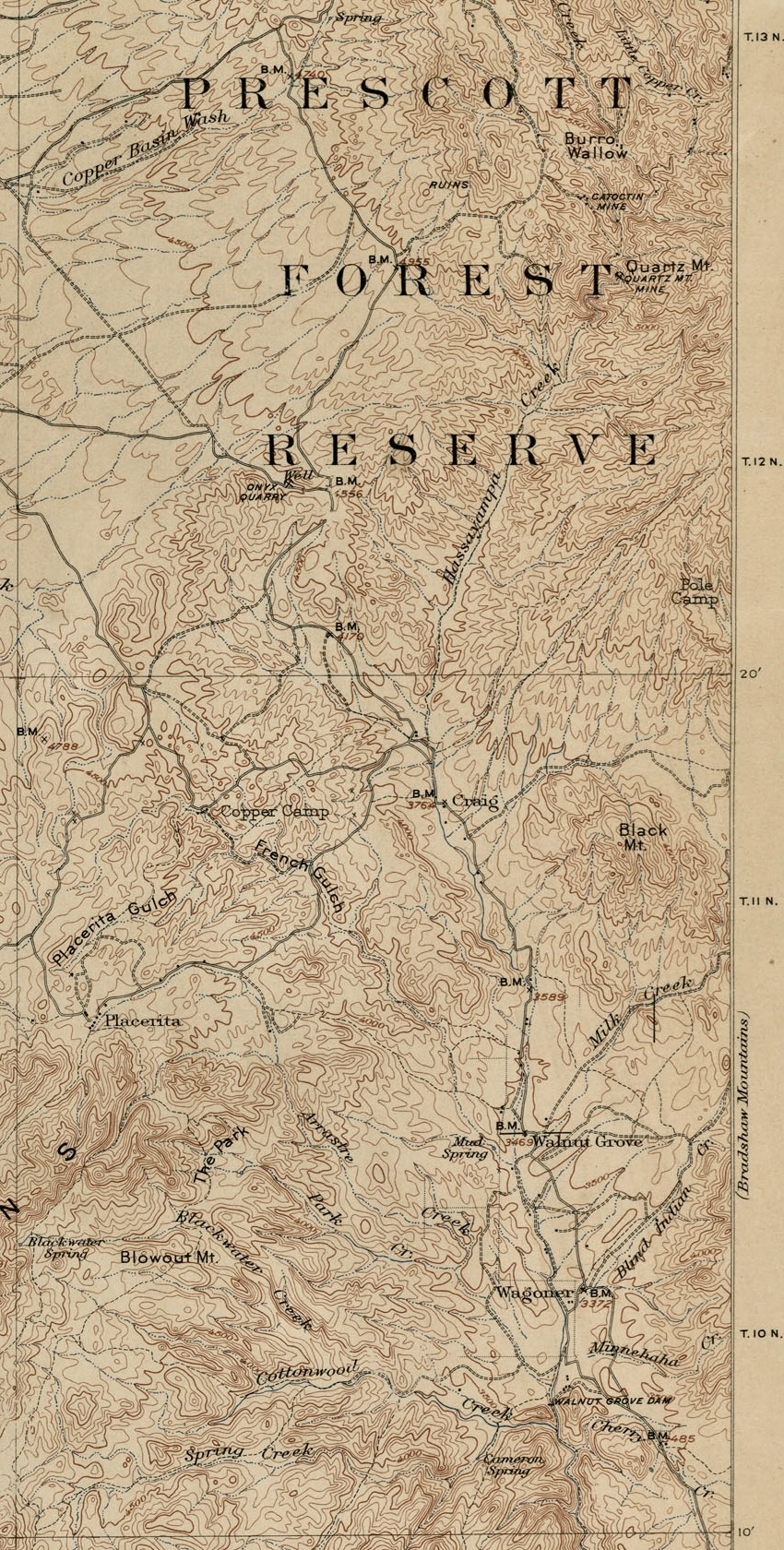
Walnut Grove and Prescott Forest Reserve, now Prescott National Forest (USGS 1903, Congress quadrangle map)

A 2008 historical survey of Walnut Creek Cemetery described Walnut Creek as a ghost town. The cemetery, containing between 140 and 180 graves, is located off Wagoner Road.
