= Hassayampa Bridge =

- U.S. National Register of Historic Places
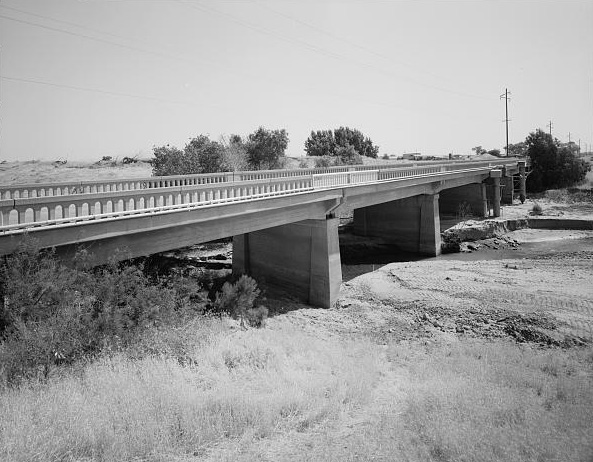
- Hassayampa Bridge in 1993

- Location within Arizona Location within the United States
- Location: Hassayampa, Arizona
- Coordinates: 33°11′10″N 112°42′15″W
- Built: 1929
- Architect: Strong and Grant
- Architectural style: Four-rib concrete deck girder
- NRHP reference No.: 88001658
- Added to NRHP: September 30, 1988

The Hassayampa Bridge is a bridge spanning the Hassayampa River in Hassayampa, Arizona, located in Maricopa County. The bridge was completed in 1929 and was listed on the National Register of Historic Places in 1988. The bridge was scheduled for demolition in 1983.

== History ==
In 1915, a timber bridge was built spanning the river. It was upgraded to a more permanent structure in 1922 with the addition of two steel trusses. In 1927, the Arizona Highway Department began to assess how to replace the existing structure with a permanent structure. Based on a concrete slab-and-girder structure, they solicited bids for the project. In 1928 they received bids from four companies, based on that design: R. H. Martin (Tucson, Arizona ), the Levy Construction Company (Denver, Colorado), Wickes Engineering and Construction Company (Des Moines, Iowa), and Strong and Grant (Springville, Utah). The contract was awarded to the low bidder, Strong and Grant, on December 4, 1928, for the sum of $47,325. Construction began in January 1929 and was completed in July of the same year. (Note: Details can be found on the pdf of the Continuation Sheet on the NPS listing for this structure.)

With the completion in 1929 of a concrete structure, the last obstacle on the state's most major east–west route, U.S. Route 80 was eliminated. US 80 was an early coast-to-coast highway in the United States, and this was an important construction on that route. At the time of its construction, US 80 was Arizona's most heavily trafficked highway. With the implementation of the Interstate Highway System in the late 1950s, the bridge was re-designated to county road status.

== Structure ==
The original design by the Arizona Highway Department consisted of a multi-span concrete slab-and-girder structure, with concrete abutments and piers. The bridge is an example of a standard construction structure used during the 1920s and 1930s, four-rib concrete deck girder. It consists of seven 45-foot-long (14 m) spans, and is considered one of the more noteworthy examples of its type in Arizona. On September 30, 1988, the bridge was listed on the National Register of Historic Places. The bridge contains over 2,000 cubic yards (1,500 m^{3}) of concrete and 146,000 pounds (66,000 kg) of steel.

The 1929, structure consists of seven spans of 45.7 feet (13.9 m) each, with a total span of 319.6 feet (97.4 m). The bridge is 24.2 feet (7.4 m) wide, and has an asphalt-over-concrete deck. The substructure is made up of concrete abutments and wingwalls with solid concrete piers. Other features of the bridge include moulded concrete guardrails with arch-pierced concrete walls, cantilevered roadway with tapered cantilevered brackets, and tapered girder haunches at piers.

== Further notes ==
The historic Hassayampa Bridge was modified and repaired in 1993. The bridge, which is described as a concrete slab and girder, is located in the Old U.S. Highway Route 80 over the Hassayampa River between Salome Highway and 309 Avenue in the areas of Hassayampa and Arlington within the boundaries of the town of Buckeye, Arizona.

The bridge was documented with drawings and photographs by the Historic American Engineering Record.

The bridge was scheduled for demolition in 1993.

1993 Modified Hassayampa Bridge
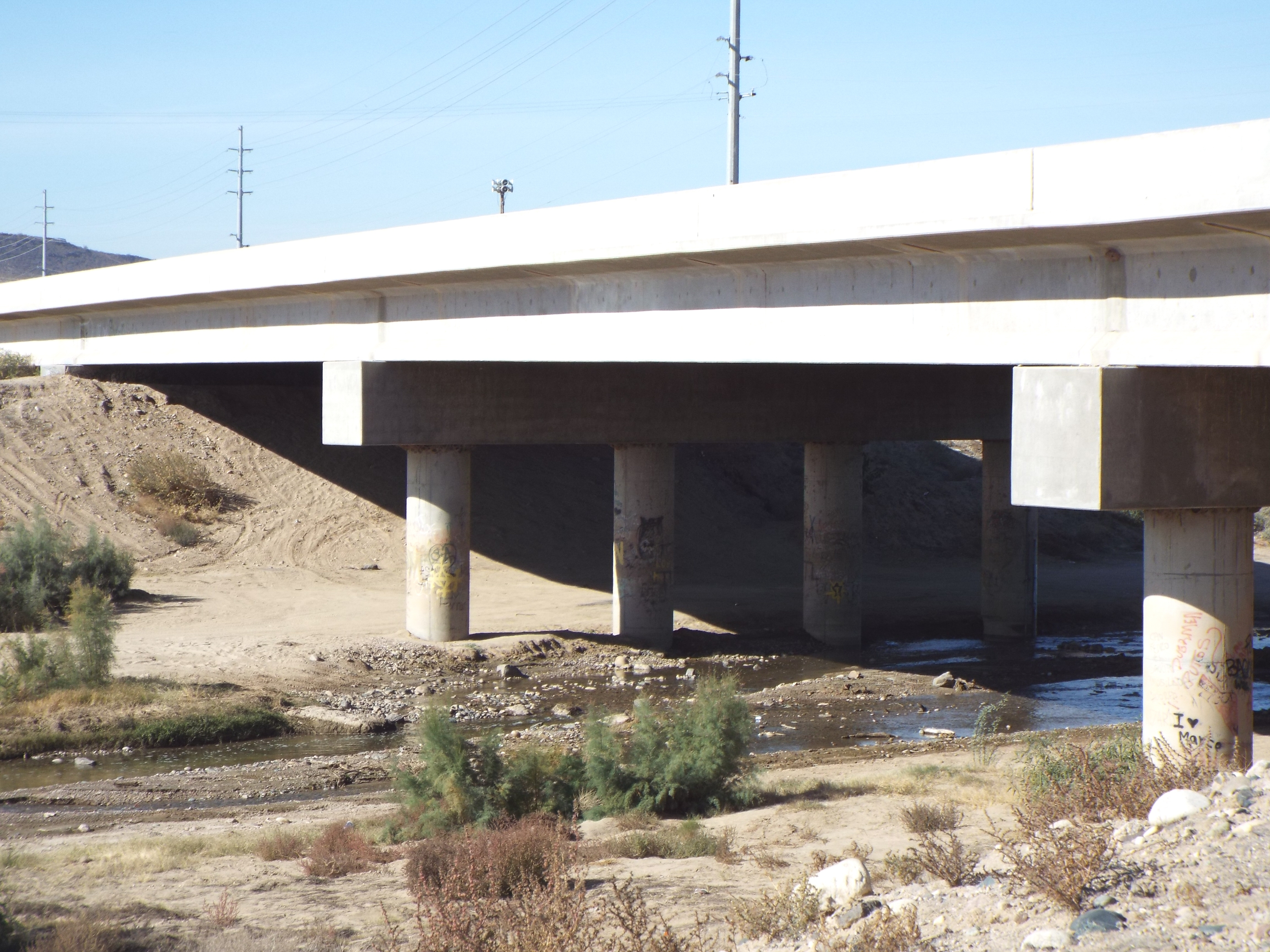
Photo from 2015

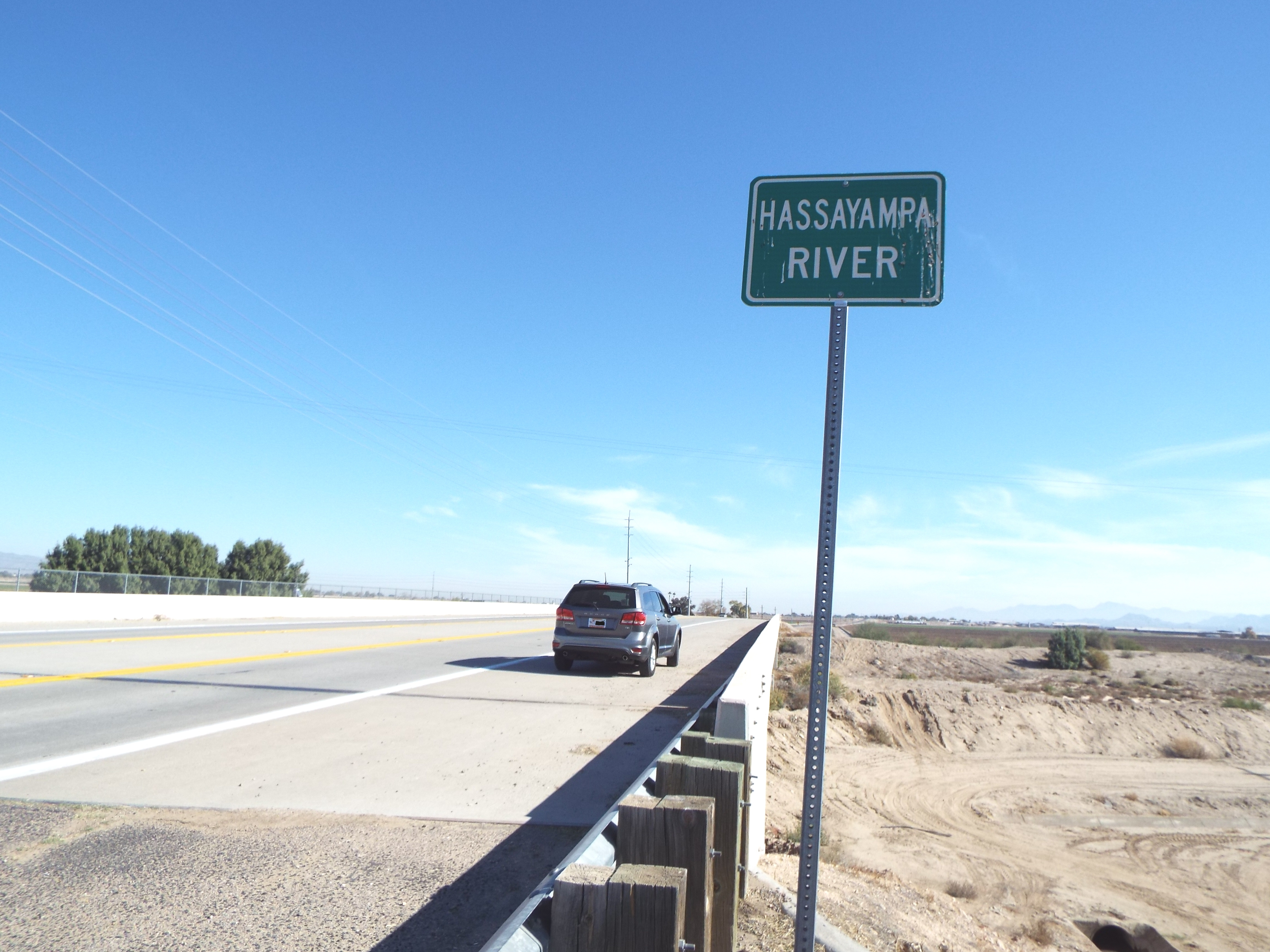
Another photo from 2015

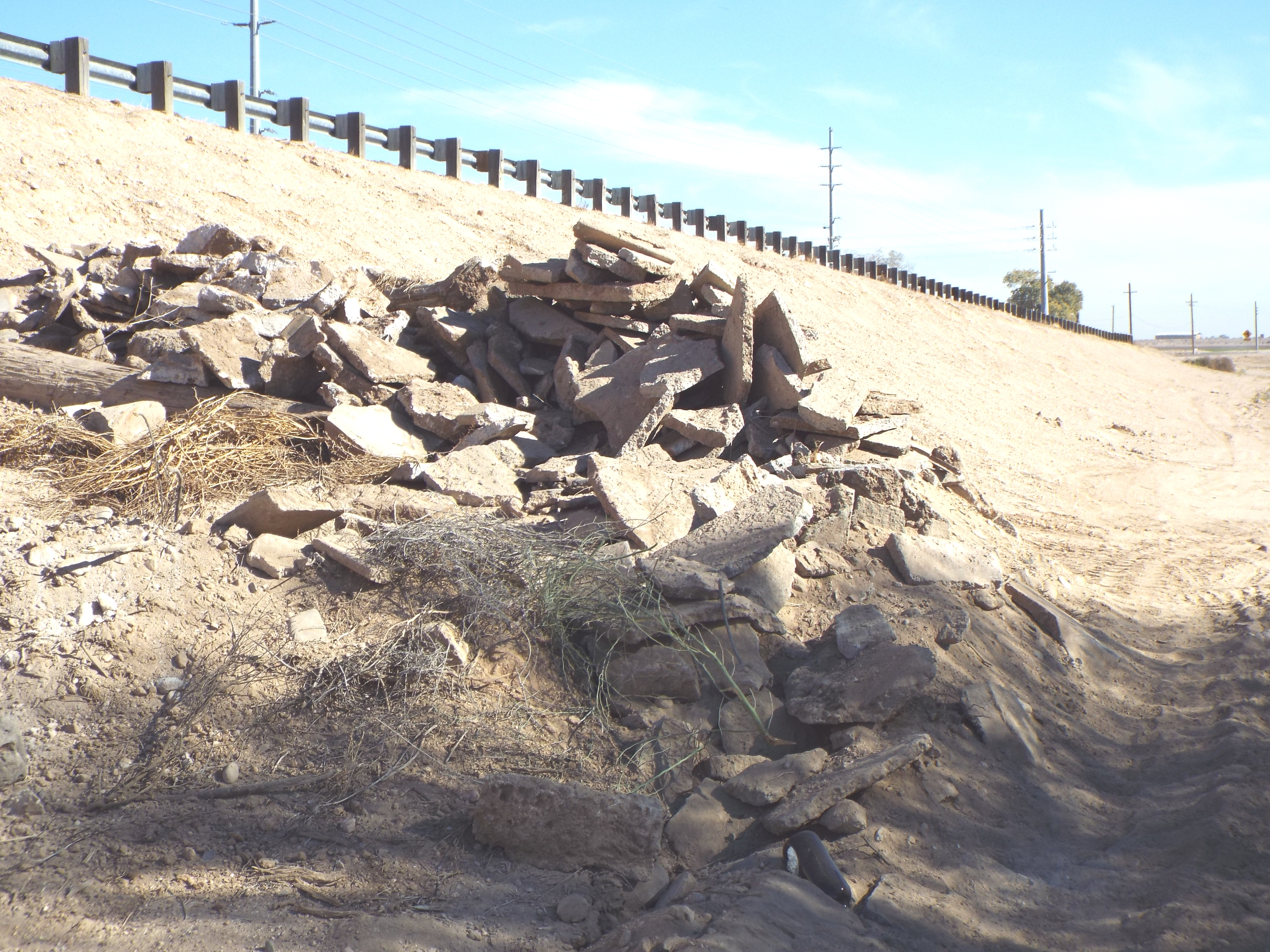
Remains of some of the original sections which were removed from the Hassayampa Bridge.

== See also ==
- List of bridges documented by the Historic American Engineering Record in Arizona
- List of bridges on the National Register of Historic Places in Arizona
- National Register of Historic Places listings in Pima County, Arizona
