= Glenbar =

Glenbar may refer to:

- Glenbar, Queensland, a locality in the Fraser Coast Region, Queensland, Australia
- Glenbarr, a village in Argyll and Bute, Scotland
- Glenbar, Arizona, United States, an unincorporated community
