= Hassayampa, Arizona =

- Populated Place
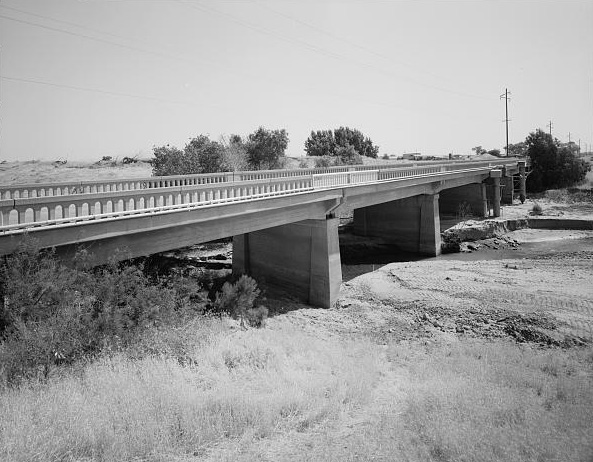
- The historic Hassayampa Bridge

- Location within the state of Arizona Hassayampa (the United States)
- Coordinates: 33°20′54″N 112°43′32″W
- Country: United States
- State: Arizona
- County: Maricopa
- Elevation: 846 ft (258 m)
- Time zone: UTC-7 (Mountain (MST))
  - Summer (DST): UTC-7 (MST)
- Area code: 520
- FIPS code: 04-30865
- GNIS feature ID: 24452

Hassayampa is a populated place situated on both banks of the Hassayampa River in western Maricopa County, Arizona. It is about four miles west of Palo Verde, Arizona, and slightly east of Dixie, Arizona, and Arlington, Arizona. It is located at the junction of Historic U.S. Route 80 and the Salome Highway to Salome. It is known for the Hassayampa Bridge, listed on the National Register of Historic Places, and the Hassayampa River Preserve.

== Features ==
In 1961, Maricopa County began operating a landfill in Hassayampa, covering 47 acres on the west side of the Hassayampa River. For an 18-month period from April 20, 1979, to October 28, 1980, the site was used to dispose of hazardous waste. As a result, the 10 acre portion of the landfill was classified as a Superfund site in 1987. Site cleanup and monitoring is ongoing, and is funded by the Hassayampa Steering Committee, which consists of 12 of the major parties responsible for disposing of the hazardous waste at the site (as well as the owner of the site during the disposal time): Maricopa County (owner), Bull, DEC, Honeywell, Alcatel, General Instrument, AT&T, Shell, Arizona Public Service Co., Intel, National Can, and Reynolds Metals. In addition, the consent decree which established the settlement is notable for the financial participation of over 70 minor parties, "de minimis parties", who are required to reimburse the 12 major dumpers. Their financial commitment is based on the volumetric share of the waste each sent to the dump. It is the first time in history that an EPA settlement included de minimis party participation.

The area is also home to the Hassayampa River Preserve, initially a 660-acre nature preserve created by The Nature Conservancy in 1987. The preserve has grown to 770 acres, and in April 2016 an agreement was reached between The Nature Conservancy and Maricopa County to integrate the preserve into the Vulture Mountains Recreation Area, a 71,000-acre recreation area located west and south of the preserve.

In 1915 a timber bridge was built spanning the river. It was upgraded to a more permanent structure in 1922 with the addition of two steel trusses. Finally in 1929 the existing concrete structure was erected, which eliminated the last obstacle on the state's most major east-west route, Highway 80. The Hassayampa Bridge is an example of a standard construction structure used during the 1920s and 1930s, four-rib concrete deck girder. It consists of seven 45-foot spans, and is considered one of the more noteworthy examples of its type in Arizona. On September 30, 1988, the bridge was listed on the National Register of Historic Places.
