= Kahachi Miliuk, Arizona =

- Populated place
- Location within the state of Arizona Kahachi Miliuk (the United States)
- Coordinates: 31°48′09″N 111°41′47″W
- Country: United States
- State: Arizona
- County: Pima
- Elevation: 2,956 ft (901 m)
- Time zone: UTC-7 (Mountain (MST))
  - Summer (DST): UTC-7 (MST)
- Area code: 520
- FIPS code: 04-36485
- GNIS feature ID: 24474

Kahachi Miliuk is a populated place situated in Pima County, Arizona, United States. It is located in the Fresnal Canyon on the Tohono O'odham Indian Reservation, and its name is derived from the three O'odham words: ge, aji, and meliwkud, meaning "big", "skinny" and "place where runners end a race" (or "finish line"). It has an estimated elevation of 2,956 feet (901 m) above sea level.
