= Hassayampa River Preserve =

Riparian nature reserve in Arizona, U.S.

- IUCN category V (protected landscape/seascape)
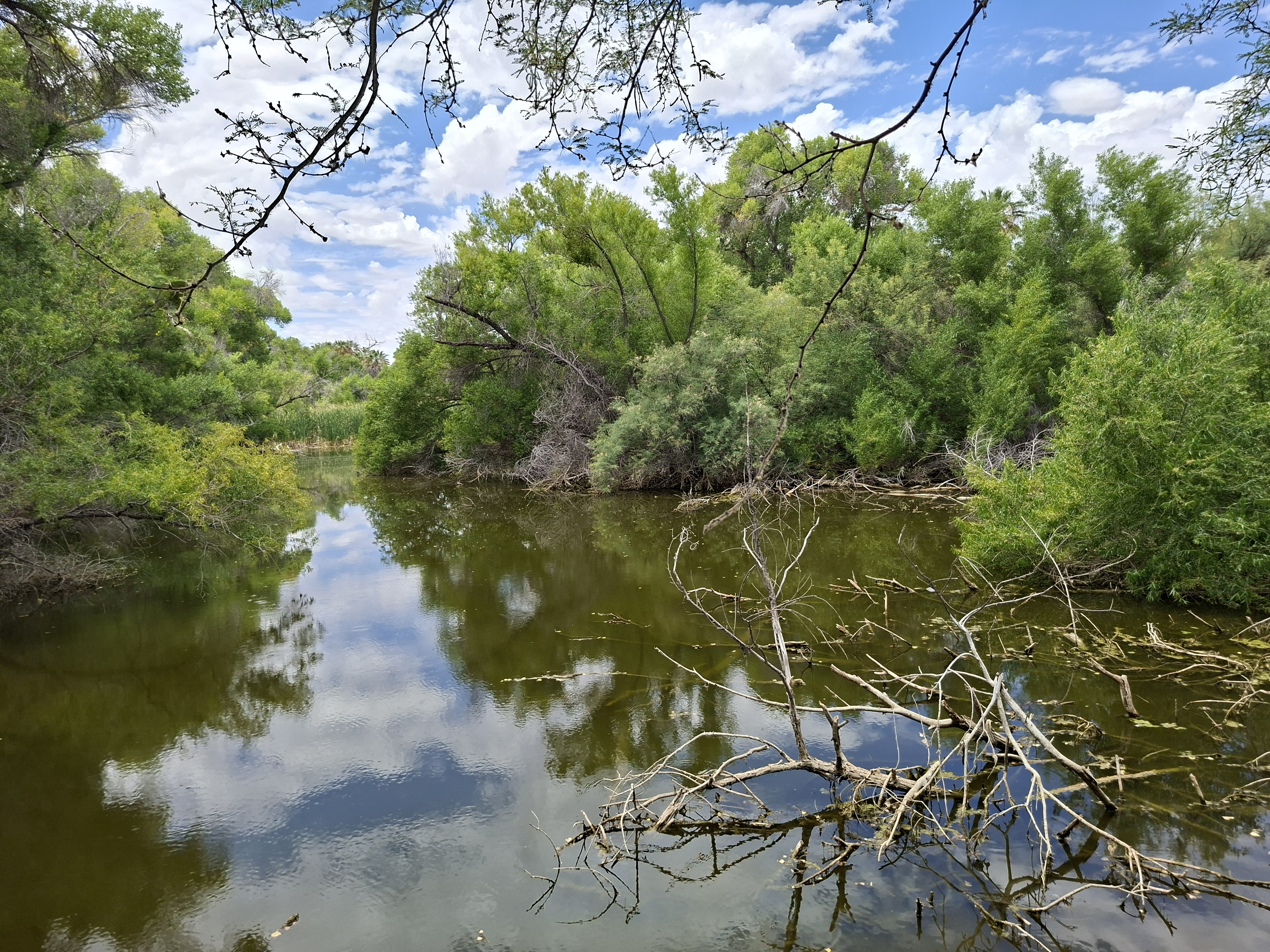
- Palm Lake at Hassayampa River Preserve

- Location within Arizona
- Location: Hassayampa, Arizona central Maricopa County
- Nearest city: Wickenburg, Arizona
- Coordinates: 33°56′15″N 112°41′58″W
- Area: 770 acres (3.1 km^{2})
- Established: 1987
- Governing body: The Nature Conservancy

The Hassayampa River Preserve is a 770-acre riparian nature reserve owned by The Nature Conservancy in the US state of Arizona, near Wickenburg in Maricopa County. The Hassayampa River has mostly subterranean flows for most of its 113 miles (182 km) length, the stretch contained within the preserve has year-round flowing water.

== History ==
The first use of the land after the arrival of European settlers was as a stagecoach stop in the 1860s. In the latter part of the 19th century it served as a farm and cattle ranch, Brill's Ranch, run by Frederick Brill. Brill provided farm products, beef, fruit, and pond-raised carp to local settlers and miners, including those at the nearby Vulture mine.

In 1913 the property was reopened as one of the first guest ranches in Arizona. Named the Garden of Allah due to the location's resemblance to the locale in the then-popular romantic novel of the same name. Its visitors were offered a true experience of a Western ranch. During this time, the palm trees were hauled in from nearby Castle Hot Springs on wagons. Over the years it saw several other uses such as a campground. The Santa Fe, Prescott and Phoenix Railway stopped at Allah, and remains of the depot are on the preserve.

In 1986, The Nature Conservancy became interested in the location, and they created the preserve in 1987, initially with the purchase of a 660-acre parcel. The preserve has grown to 770 acres, and in April 2016 an agreement was reached between The Nature Conservancy and Maricopa County to integrate the preserve into the Vulture Mountains Recreation Area, a 71,000-acre recreation area located west and south of the preserve.

== Flora and fauna ==
The preserve is located in the Sonoran Desert, which contain one of the most rare and threatened types of riparian environments, cottonwood-willow forests. During the last 100 years, it has been estimated that over 90% of these environments have been either lost or damaged. These environments are particularly important to many forms of wildlife, and it is estimated that at least 80% of Arizona's wildlife depend on these riparian environments. Because of the year-round water and lush vegetation, the preserve is considered to be an oasis in the Sonoran Desert, and is home to approximately 300 different bird species, as well as numerous other wildlife.

=== Flora ===
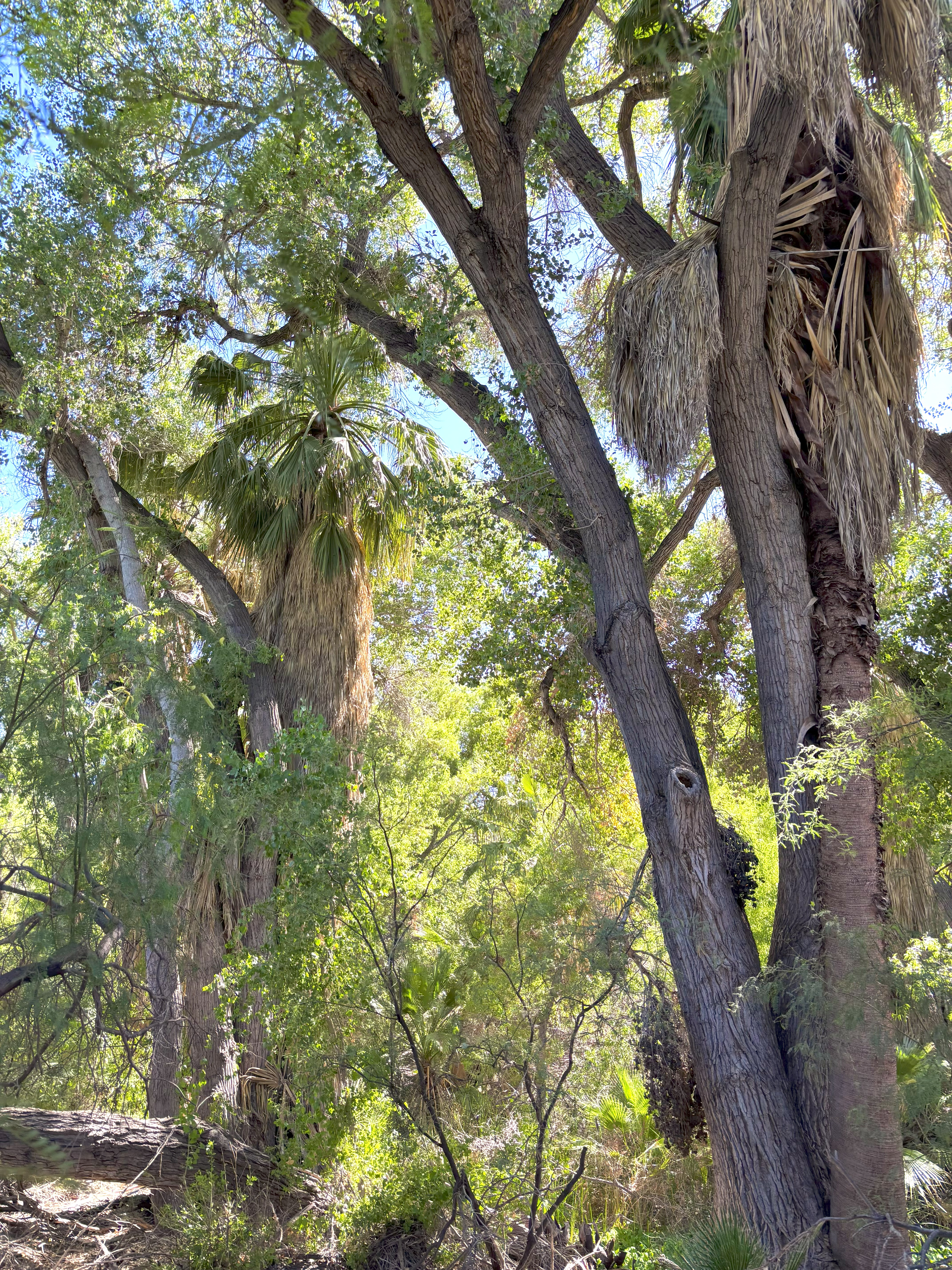
California fan palms (Washingtonia filifera) growing alongside cottonwoods (Populus fremontii) at Palm Lake in the Hassayampa River Preserve, Maricopa County, Arizona.

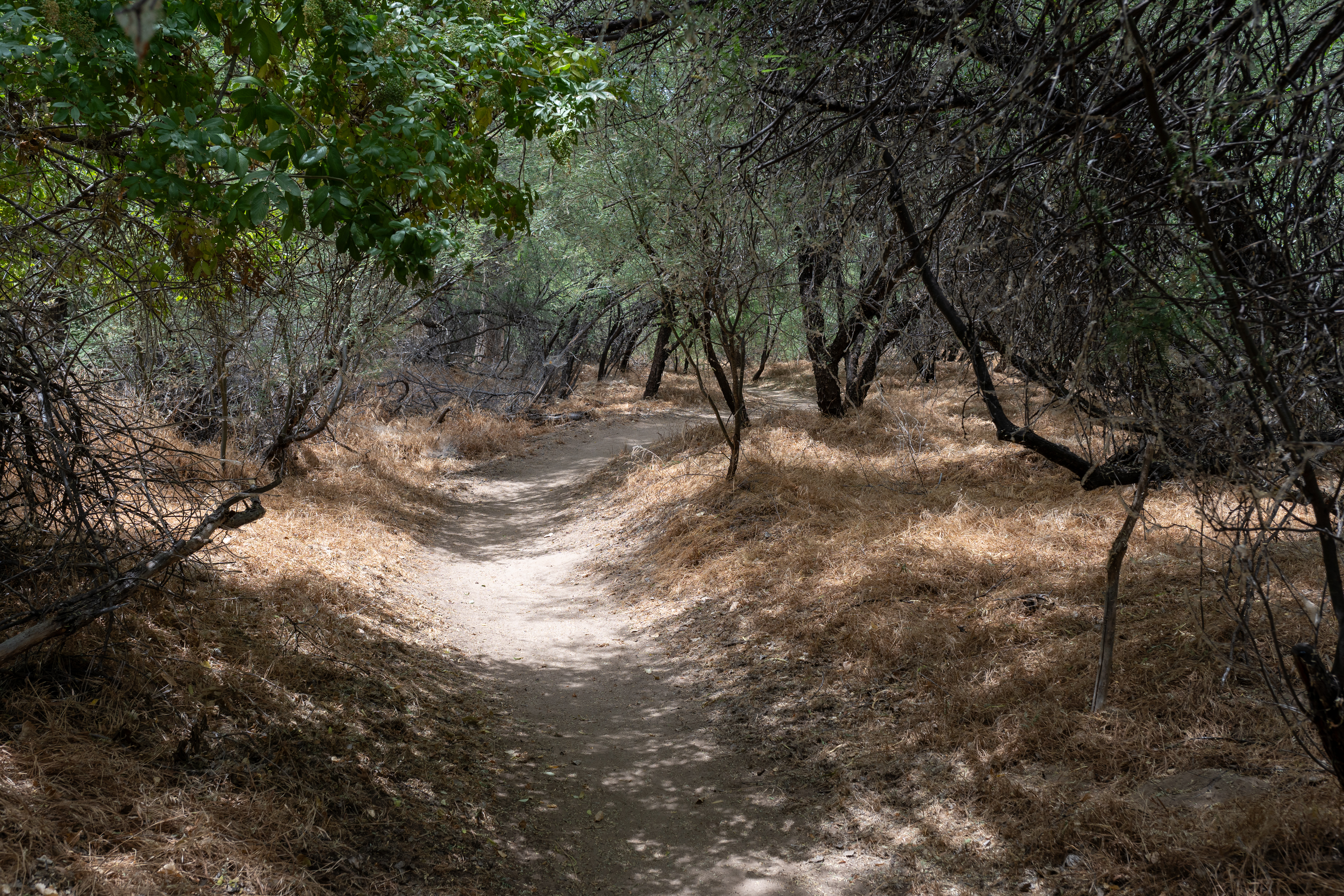
Riparian understory at the Preserve with a trail running through a mesquite bosque with an elder berry tree in the foreground

The year-round water supply makes the forest canopy particularly lush in the otherwise dry Sonoran Desert, and is one of the most unusual forest types in North America. The predominant trees are Goodding's willows and Fremont cottonwoods. Others species found within the Preserve include California fan palms, saguaro, barrel cactus, cholla cactus, mesquite, and paloverde. Flowering plants such as penstemon, verbena, fleabane, lupine, poppies, primroses, mallows, elderberries, claret cup hedgehog cactus, desert willow, aster, sacred datura, desert broom, yerba mansa and brittlebush are also found in the Preserve. Non-native which now call the Preserve home include figs and mulberries.

=== Fauna ===
Many species of animals reside within the preserve. Among them are hooded skunks, spotted skunks, hog-nosed skunks, stink badgers, coyotes, mule deer, javelina, raccoons, Gila monsters, ringtails, rock squirrels, spiny lizards, leopard frogs, Clark's spiny lizard, ornate tree lizard, Gilbert's skink, ring-necked snake, western diamondback rattlesnake, king snakes, gopher snakes, coral snakes, red racers, desert tortoise, gray fox, bobcats, and mountain lions.

==== Birds ====
The area is home to rare breeding populations of both gray and red-shouldered hawks. Species which call the Preserve home include Abert's towhee, American yellow warbler, Anna's hummingbird, ash-throated flycatcher, Bell's vireo, black-chinned hummingbird, black phoebe, black-tailed gnatcatcher, brown-crested flycatcher, Bullock's oriole, canyon wren, common yellowthroat, Cooper's hawk, crissal thrasher, curve-billed thrasher, Gambel's quail, Gila woodpecker, greater roadrunner, hooded oriole, ladder-backed woodpecker, lesser goldfinch, Lucy's warbler, northern cardinal, phainopepla, song sparrow, summer tanager, tropical kingbird, vermilion flycatcher, western kingbird, willow flycatcher, yellow-billed cuckoo, and yellow-breasted chat.

Migratory species include American robin, belted kingfisher, Bewick's wren, black-headed grosbeak, black-throated gray warbler, blue-gray gnatcatcher, blue grosbeak, Brewer's sparrow, bridled titmouse, brown creeper, bushtits, Cassin's vireo, cedar waxwing, cinnamon teal, dark-eyed junco, dusky flycatcher, gray flycatcher, green-tailed towhee, green-winged teal, hermit thrush, hermit warbler, hooded merganser, house wren, Hutton's vireo, indigo bunting, lark sparrow, lazuli bunting, Lincoln's sparrow, MacGillivray's warbler, marsh wren, Nashville warbler, Northern "Red-shafted" Flicker, olive-sided flycatcher, orange-crowned warbler, Pacific-slope flycatcher, plumbeous vireo, red-naped sapsucker, ring-necked duck, ruby-crowned kinglet, rufous hummingbird, sharp-shinned hawk, Sora, Townsend's warbler, Virginia's warbler, warbling vireo, western bluebird, western tanager, western wood pewee, white-crowned sparrow, Wilson's warbler, and yellow-rumped warbler.

Waterbirds which visit the Preserve include the great blue heron, the green heron, and the pied-billed grebe.

Some of the more rare species which have been seen in the Preserve include black hawk, eastern phoebe, green kingfisher, Harris's hawk, Lawrence's goldfinch, magnolia warbler, Mississippi kite, pyrrholuxia, rufous-backed robin, winter wren, yellow-billed cuckoo, and zone-tailed hawk.
