= Kuit Vaya, Arizona =

- Populated place
- Location within the state of Arizona Kuit Vaya (the United States)
- Coordinates: 31°40′42″N 111°40′51″W
- Country: United States
- State: Arizona
- County: Pima
- Elevation: 3,205 ft (977 m)
- Time zone: UTC-7 (Mountain (MST))
  - Summer (DST): UTC-7 (MST)
- Area code: 520
- FIPS code: 04-39040
- GNIS feature ID: 24487

Kuit Vaya is a populated place located within Fresnal Canyon, in Pima County, Arizona, United States. It has an estimated elevation of 3,205 feet (977 m) above sea level. The name comes from the Tohono O'odham kui wahia, meaning "mesquite well".
