= Wagoner, Arizona =

Ghost town in Arizona, United States

- Populated place
- Location within the state of Arizona Wagoner (the United States)
- Coordinates: 34°12′49″N 112°32′09″W
- Country: United States
- State: Arizona
- County: Yavapai
- Elevation: 3,383 ft (1,031 m)
- Time zone: UTC-7 (Mountain (MST))
  - Summer (DST): UTC-7 (MST)
- Area code: 928
- FIPS code: 04-80360
- GNIS feature ID: 35806

Wagoner is a ghost town situated in Yavapai County, Arizona, United States. It has an estimated elevation of 3,383 feet (1,031 m) above sea level. The town was founded on mining in the early 1800s, but declined by the early 1900s. It once boasted a two-story hotel, a dance hall, a barn, and a general store with a handpump gasoline dispenser. It was a popular spot to take sick children during the summer, to escape the heat of nearby Phoenix. This practice stopped once the railroad was built to nearby Prescott, which was cooler. In 1890, the town narrowly avoided the Walnut Grove dam collapse, but the workers who died in its collapse are buried in the town cemetery. Its hotel burned down in 1942, and the dance hall followed suit in 1948. What remained of the town was bulldozed in 1997. The only visible remaining structures are various graves, and the gas tank of the general store. It was named after Ed Wagoner, who founded the town. The post office was established in 1893.

== Education ==
Wagoner is in Kirkland Elementary School District. As of 1976 the Prescott Unified School District takes secondary students from the district, as it is required to under law. The Prescott district operates Prescott High School.
