= Kuakatch, Arizona =

- Populated place
- Location within the state of Arizona Kuakatch (the United States)
- Coordinates: 32°08′15″N 112°39′47″W
- Country: United States
- State: Arizona
- County: Pima
- Tribe: Tohono O'odham Nation
- Elevation: 2,142 ft (653 m)
- Time zone: UTC-7 (Mountain (MST))
  - Summer (DST): UTC-7 (MST)
- Area code: 520
- FIPS code: 04-38980
- GNIS feature ID: 6776

Kuakatch is a populated place situated in Pima County, Arizona, United States. It has an estimated elevation of 2,142 feet (653 m) above sea level. Historically, it has also been known as Kookatsh, Pozo de Federico, and Walls Well. The last variation was derived from Frederick Wall, who dug a well just south of the Tohono O'odham village in the late 1800s. The name was officially designated as Kuakatch by a Board on Geographic Names decision in 1941. Kuakatch is derived from the Tohono O'odham phrase, ku:kaj, meaning "its end", referring to the nearby mountain, thus Kuakatch means "end of the mountain".
