= Glen Oaks, Arizona =

Populated place in Yavapai County, Arizona

- Populated Place
- Location within the state of Arizona Glen Oaks (the United States)
- Coordinates: 34°26′35″N 112°32′55″W
- Country: United States
- State: Arizona
- County: Yavapai
- Elevation: 5,495 ft (1,675 m)
- Time zone: UTC-7 (Mountain (MST))
  - Summer (DST): UTC-7 (MST)
- Area code: 928
- FIPS code: 04-28000
- GNIS feature ID: 29339

Glen Oaks is a populated place situated in Yavapai County, Arizona, United States. It has an estimated elevation of 5,495 feet (1,675 m) above sea level.
