= Kupk, Arizona =

- Populated place
- Location within the state of Arizona Kupk (the United States)
- Coordinates: 31°55′25″N 112°12′49″W
- Country: United States
- State: Arizona
- County: Pima
- Elevation: 1,844 ft (562 m)
- Time zone: UTC-7 (Mountain (MST))
  - Summer (DST): UTC-7 (MST)
- Area code: 520
- FIPS code: 04-39070
- GNIS feature ID: 24488

Kupk is a populated place located on the Tohono O'odham Indian Reservation in Pima County, Arizona, United States. It has an estimated elevation of 1,844 feet (562 m) above sea level. Its name is derived from the Tohono O'odham ku:pik, meaning dam or dike.
