= Komak Wuacho, Arizona =

- Populated place
- Location within the state of Arizona Komak Wuacho (the United States)
- Coordinates: 32°13′25″N 112°19′48″W
- Country: United States
- State: Arizona
- County: Pima
- Elevation: 2,011 ft (613 m)
- Time zone: UTC-7 (Mountain (MST))
  - Summer (DST): UTC-7 (MST)
- Area code: 520
- FIPS code: 04-38630
- GNIS feature ID: 24484

Komak Wuacho is a populated place situated in Pima County, Arizona, United States. The name comes from the Tohono O'odham komadk weco, meaning "flats beneath". It has an estimated elevation of 2,011 feet (613 m) above sea level.
