= Walnut Grove Dam =

Former dam in Arizona, failed 1890

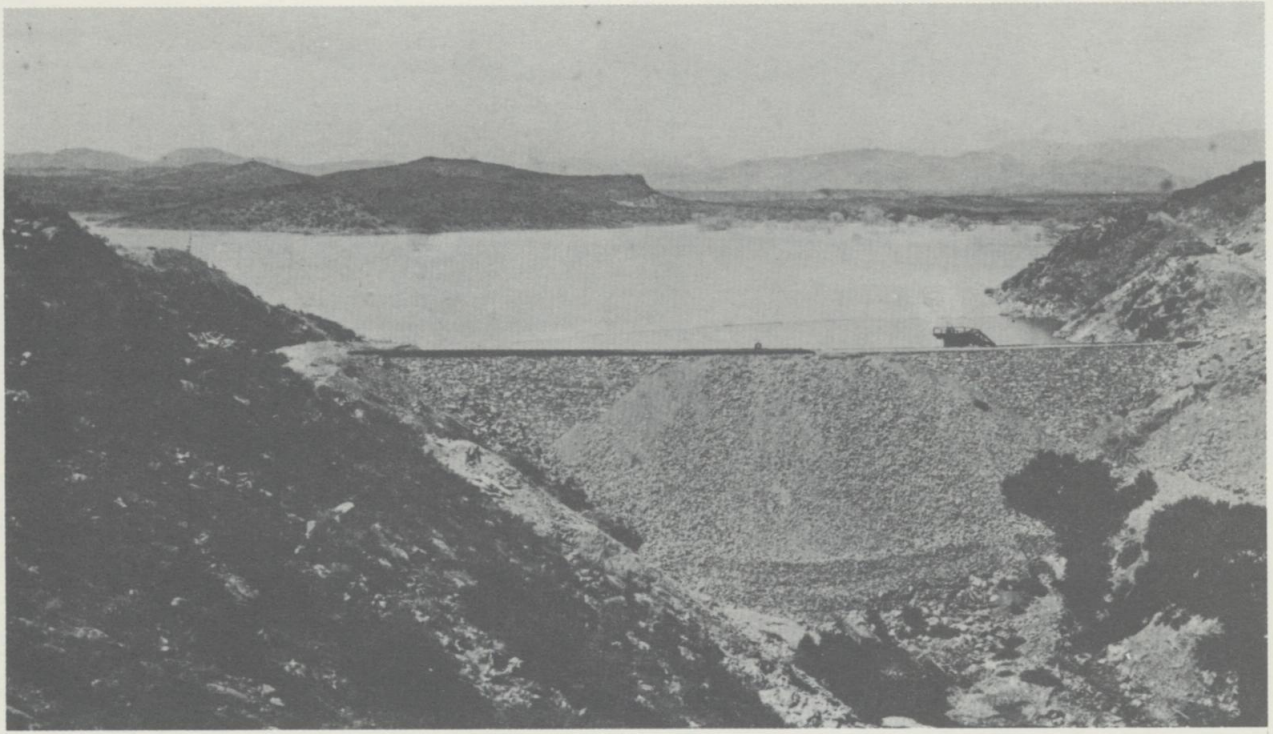
- Walnut Grove dam before its collapse

- Location within Arizona Location within the United States
- Location: Yavapai County, Arizona, U.S.
- Coordinates: 34°11′35.0″N 112°32′29.7″W
- Purpose: Mining, water storage
- Status: Failed
- Construction began: 1886
- Opening date: 1888
- Demolition date: 1890
- Construction cost: $300,000 ($9.53 million in 2024 dollars)
- Owner: Walnut Grove Water Storage Company

Dam and spillways
- Type of dam: Rock fill
- Impounds: Hassayampa River
- Height: 110 ft (34 m)
- Length: 400 ft (120 m)
- Width (crest): 10 ft (3.0 m)
- Width (base): 138 ft (42 m)
- Dam volume: 4,000,000,000 US gal (1.5×10^{10} L)
- Spillway type: Channel
- Spillway capacity: 2,200 cu ft/s (62 m^{3}/s)

Reservoir
- Surface area: 1,120 acres (4.5 km^{2})

The Walnut Grove Dam was built north of Wickenburg, Arizona, United States, along the Hassayampa River. Its failure in 1890 killed over 100 people. Its construction from 1886 to 1888 was chiefly on the impetus of the Bates family, whose mismanagement of the project was considerable. Intended to be used for gold mining, the dam failed before it could be put to use.

== Construction ==
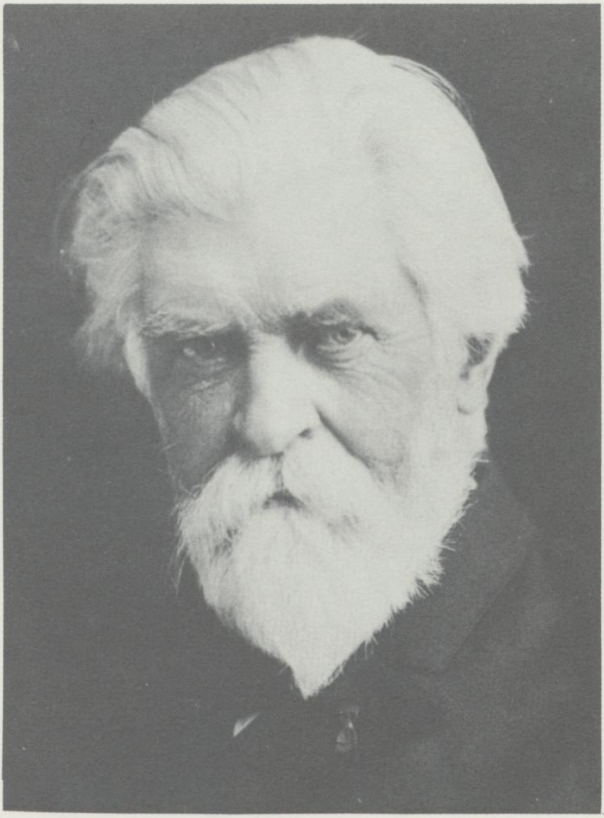
William Phipps Blake, initial chief engineer to the project

Gold was discovered along the tributaries of the Hassayampa River in 1863 by Pauline Weaver and Joseph R. Walker, prompting an Arizona gold rush. The river is subject to considerable seasonal change, including vast flash floods. In the words of one prospector, the river was a place "where at times an ocean steamer might be floated, and where at other seasons ... the fish must carry canteens."

Into this environment came two brothers, Wells & DeWitt Bates, who filed 63 placer gold mining claims in 1881 along the Hassayampa. Just a mile from Rich Hill, Arizona (the site of the Weaver/Walker gold rush), the Bates brothers purchased the Marcus mine, hoping to strike it rich. They intended to follow the example of the California gold rush and use hydraulic mining. But the ephemeral nature of the Hassayampa made such operations difficult year round. To solve this, the brothers resolved to build a dam. Efforts to procure land and capital for the dam were in earnest by 1883. Wells Bates spent a portion of 1883 in the area, making legal arrangements related to building a dam, including claiming all the water in the Hassayampa. The brothers established the Walnut Grove Water Storage Company for the purpose of creating a dam.

A site some 20 mi (32 km) north of Wickenburg was chosen for the dam, mostly for gold mining, but also for general purpose irrigation. William P. Blake was the initial designer, but was fired shortly after beginning work in 1886. Blake (a prominent geologist and grand-nephew of Eli Whitney) seems to have been on the project only so that his reputation might attract investors. While he had considerable mining experience, Blake lacked civil engineering or dam building experience. Blake accompanied Wells Bates to the dam site in February 1886, where further rights to build a dam were secured, and it was determined a considerable amount of gold could be retrieved. Blake returned to New York, but was back on site by August 1886. He and two of his sons oversaw the digging of a quarry for dam fill, the construction of roads, a sawmill, an office, and quarters for workers, and the building of the initial part of the dam. Wells Bates, and Charles Henry Dillingham, visited the dam in Christmas 1886. Christmas was described as pleasant by all involved, including Blake who noted they had had a "fatted turkey". But it seems Dillingham was annoyed by a conversation he had witnessed the day before between Blake and another local prospector. So Dillingham returned on January 15, 1887, and fired Blake. Blake was very bitter, feeling that he had done the most difficult work for very little pay, but acquiesced on January 30. Blake was replaced by the firm of Nagle and Leonard, of San Francisco. The position of Chief Engineer, formerly Blake's, went to N.E. Robinson.

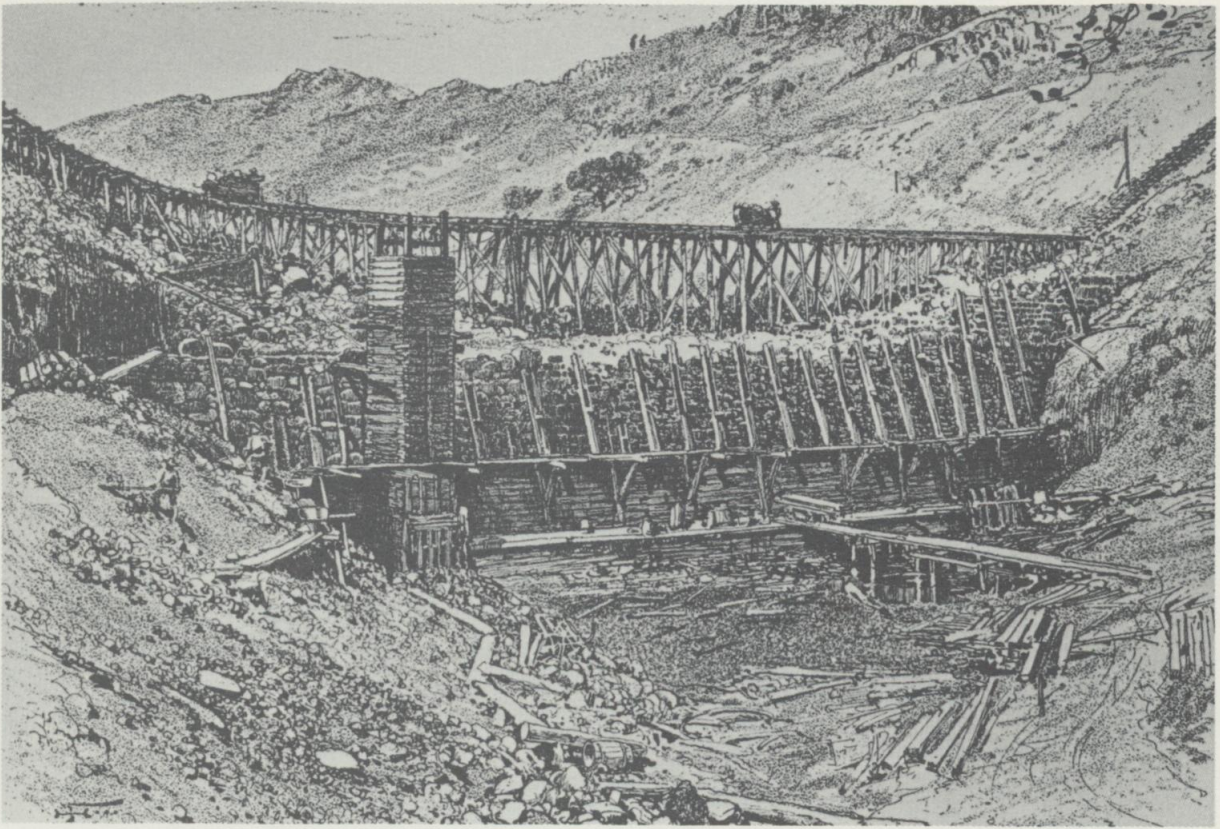
An illustration of the Walnut Grove Dam under construction, in Scribner's Magazine, January 7, 1890

Robinson proved a more able engineer than Blake. He revamped the dam's design, rebuilt the leaky core of the dam, and called for a large spillway 55 ft (17 m) wide by 12 ft (3.7 m) deep. Crucially, Robinson's design for the spillway put the outflow about a half mile away from the dam itself. But Robinson's design also grew much higher, to 110 ft (34 m) tall, 35 ft (11 m) more than Blake's. Robinson seems to have been the most competent of the many engineers who were cycled through the project. But Robinson soon discovered that the Bates brothers were more interested in selling stock than building an actually sturdy dam. Despite Robinson's quality work, he was fired for unknown reasons just four months after being hired. The final design was done by Walter Gillette Bates, a Bates brothers' nephew. Walter had no experience, having previously been a professor.

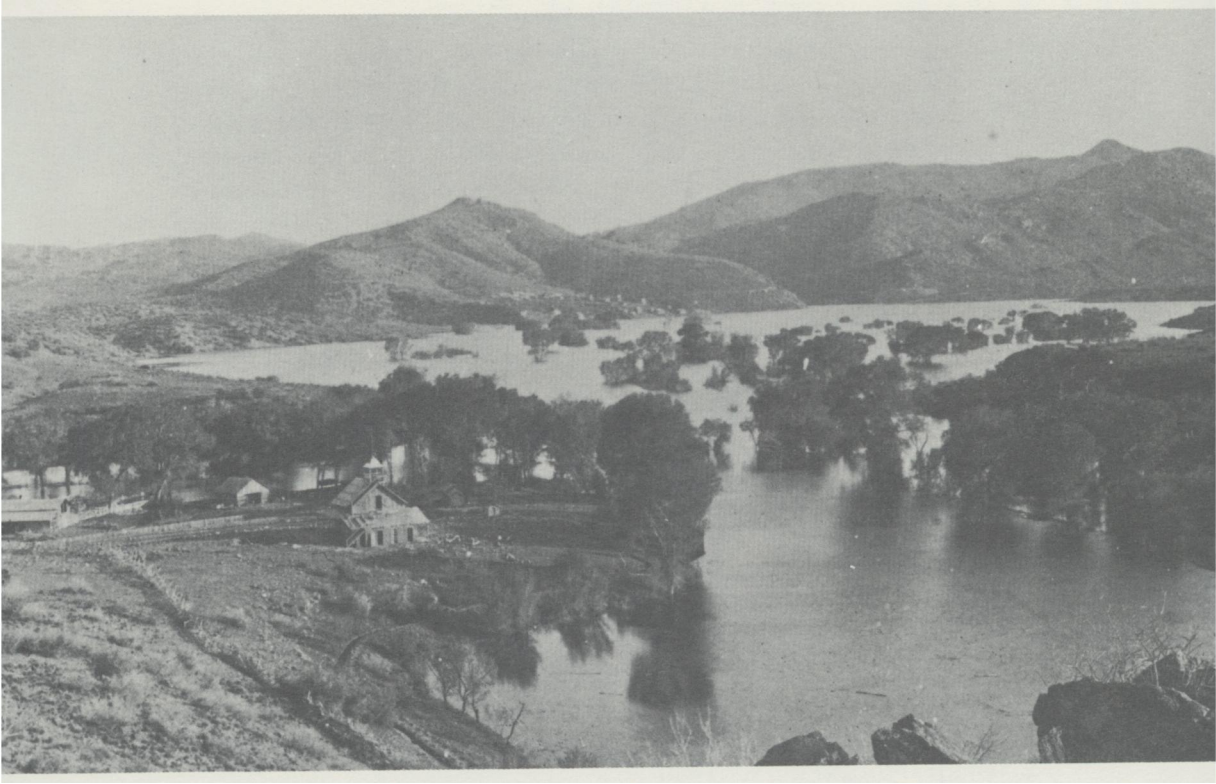
Walnut Grove Dam's reservoir, showing the Wade Ranch, before the collapse

Robinson's equally competent assistant, John M. Currier, resigned shortly thereafter, noting that the firm of Nagle and Leonard was doing very shoddy work. Failures under Nagle included a bulge in the dam, carelessly blasting dynamite next to the dam, and reducing the spillway size to 20 ft (6.1 m) wide and 5 ft (1.5 m) deep. Further, the spillway was to be put next to the dam, instead of half a mile away. Despite these changes, the dam was to remain taller than originally planned. But Nagle remained as chief contractor, working a crew of 200 men in shifts 24 hours a day. Nagle was entirely unsupervised by an engineer for about a month. A new chief engineer, Luther Wagoner, began work on August 10, 1887. Wagoner noted that the spillway plan was inadequate, but his objections seem to have gone largely unheeded. The spillway was built starting in December 1887, and came out to a dimension of 26 ft (7.9 m) wide and 7 ft (2.1 m) deep.

At this point, a last minute design change occurred. Previously, the dam was to be dispensed using a flume system, to feed the hydraulic works and various ranches. But this plan was scrapped in favor of creating a small diversion dam some 14 mi (23 km) downriver, which would be fed by discharging the dam back into the river. Work went very slowly in 1888 due to poor management. Dillingham Bates was also replaced as president of the Walnut Grove Water Storage Company by the wealthy Henry Spingler Van Beuren. That the project was supervised from distant New York further degraded its construction quality. Van Beuren appointed a new Chief Engineer: Alexander Oswald Brodie, who would go on to become Territorial Governor of Arizona. The dam was nominally completed in 1888. Projects to improve the dam, and to prepare downstream areas for mining, continued until its collapse, and were overseen by Brodie as a nominal engineer. The dam was finished at a price of $300,000 (equivalent to $9,530,127 in 2024).

Considerable rains in 1889 revealed limits of the dam. The dam filled to within a foot of the top, and the spillway had to be cleared of a logjam by workers. The Army was concerned enough that the Signal Corps built a weather station at the dam. But the management was unperturbed, and did not order the workers camp, just below the diversion dam, to be moved. Still, the company realized the spillway needed improvement. Wells Bates ordered an expansion of the spillway, enlisting Benjamin S. Church, dean of the American Hydraulic Engineers. Church confirmed that the spillway was inadequate, and work on it continued. Van Beuren and some of his family visited the dam in the winter of 1889/1890, enjoying the reservoir and the boating it offered. Van Beuren also tried to speed the project along. Van Beuren oversaw the delivery of the hydraulic equipment to begin gold mining, and was away in Phoenix for that purpose when the dam burst. Mining had been set to begin about a month after the dam burst.

The final dam was 110 ft (34 m) tall, 400 ft (120 m) long at the top, 10 ft (3.0 m) wide at the top, 150 ft (46 m) long at the base, and 138 ft (42 m) wide at the base. Its construction was rock fill, made of locally blasted granite. The spillway's final size after expansion work is uncertain, but was estimated as having a capacity of 2,200 cubic feet per second. Such a spillway could only handle at most a five year flood (a flood having a 20% chance of occurring in any given year) given the 400 sq mi (1,000 km^{2}) watershed behind the Hassayampa. The surface area of the reservoir was 1,120 acres (4.5 km^{2}).

== Failure ==
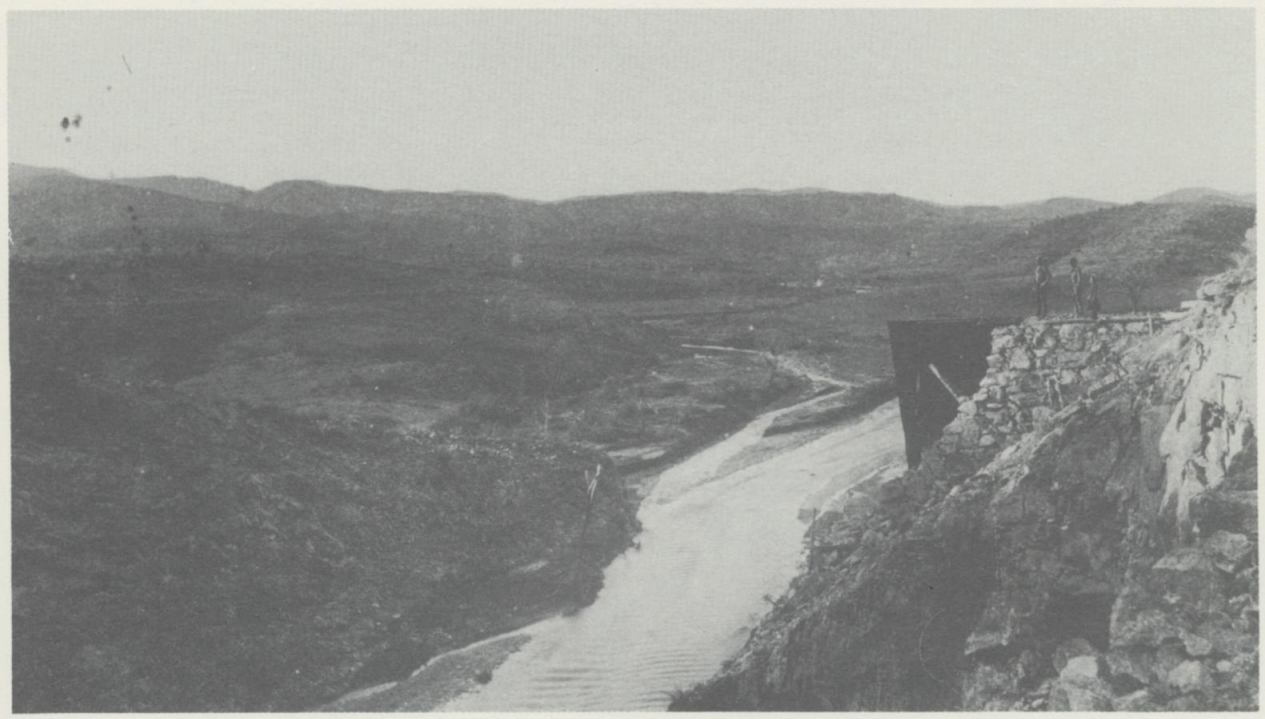
Walnut Grove dam after its collapse

A period of heavy rain began on February 16, 1890. Some 7 in (180 mm) of rain fell not only at Walnut Grove, but also upstream at Fort Whipple. The event was estimated as a 25-year flood (a flood having a 4% chance of occurring in any given year). Emergency work to widen the spillway was ordered by dam superintendent Thomas H. Brown. But by the 21st the spillway was being scoured by so much water that its bank closest to the dam broke. Water was now scouring the dam, and Brown was certain the dam would fail. Brown asked for a man who knew the territory so as to go warn of the impending disaster. He found Dan Burke, a blacksmith and habitual drunk. Burke knew the territory, and at 2:30 in the afternoon Brown gave him the camp's best horse and told him to rush to warn those downriver that the dam would soon fail. But despite Brown's humanitarian instincts, he made a "fatal mistake too: he paid Burke ahead of the task."

Rather than riding downriver, Burke stopped in a nearby bar for a drink, using the money he had just been paid. Burke got drunk, and never warned anyone of the imminent failure. At 9 that night, water overtopped the dam. The strain on the dam snapped solid steel cables holding the intake tower together.

Shortly after midnight on February 22, the Walnut Grove Dam gave way. Four billion gallons (15 billion liters) of water rushed down the canyon. A 50 ft (15 m) tall wall of water reached the diversion dam at 2 in the morning. The flood washed away the worker's camp and company headquarters, killing some 50 workers. A second messenger, William Akard (who had earlier found Burke drunk at a ranch), was caught and killed in the deluge just before he could reach the camp at the diversion dam to warn them. The water continued on to Wickenburg, washing away settlements on the way, killing others, and destroying the ranch of the eponymous Henry Wickenburg. The true death toll may never be known, and as many as 150 may have died. The dam workers who died are buried in Wagoner, Arizona.

News of the disaster reached Prescott (the county seat) at 8 that evening, and Sheriff Buckey O'Neill assembled a rescue party. O'Neill rode downriver, burying bodies and rendering aid.

== Aftermath ==
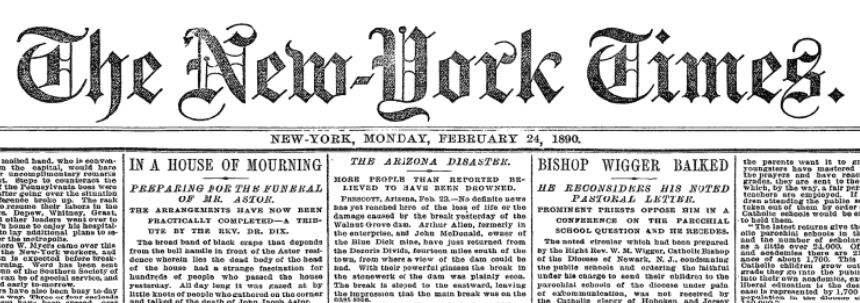
Front page of The New York Times on February 24, 1890, with news of the dam collapse front and center

The Johnstown Flood, a dam collapse which killed over 2,200 people, had occurred the previous year, and the impacts of that flood made the collapse of the Walnut Grove Dam much more significant. The story made the front page of the New York Times. The week after, John Wesley Powell gave a brusque and damning account of the collapse to Congress, noting "an ignorant engineer believes the dam is safe ... for he has never seen it at flood time." Powell said that a hydrologic survey is a must for dam building, and that engineers need to plan for every contingency.

Immediately, victims began suing the dam company. Chief among them were a pair of orphaned girls, who sued for $50,000 for the death of both parents, and Henry Wickenburg who sued for $8,000 for the destruction of his ranch. The orphans' suit was dismissed on technical grounds. The haphazard construction process led to considerable finger pointing, and no individual or company was ever held liable. Though the Walnut Grove Water Storage Company avoided liability, without a dam it could not avoid bankruptcy. It owed $100,000 to the Farmers' Loan and Trust Company in a mortgage of the placer claims, which was foreclosed on in October 1891. With the loss of its gold mines, the company was effectively disestablished.

Historian David B. Dill, Jr. notes "from its conception, the Walnut Grove dam had been a disaster in the making." He faults Blake for lacking experience, the company for not following Robinson's plans, Nagle & Leonard for shoddy construction, and management for failing to warn those downriver. He notes that the disaster was little considered in Arizona, emblematic of a lack of corporate conscience and a popular admiration of the wealthy. At any rate, the failure of the dam served as a lesson to southwestern dam builders, whose future projects were far more meticulous than Walnut Grove. The collapse was the second greatest disastrous loss of life in Arizona after the 1956 Grand Canyon mid-air collision.

The dam was never rebuilt. All that remains of the dam is a diversion tunnel, construction roads, and some chunks of the spillway. The river below the dam remains a popular spot for gold hunters.
