= Grapevine, Arizona =

Populated place in Gila County, Arizona

- Populated Place
- Location within the state of Arizona Grapevine (the United States)
- Coordinates: 33°39′04″N 111°02′56″W
- Country: United States
- State: Arizona
- County: Gila
- Elevation: 2,208 ft (673 m)
- Time zone: UTC-7 (Mountain (MST))
  - Summer (DST): UTC-7 (MST)
- Area code: 928
- FIPS code: 04-29165
- GNIS feature ID: 29504

Grapevine is a populated place situated in Gila County, Arizona, United States. It has an estimated elevation of 2,208 feet (673 m) above sea level.
