= Gurli Put Vo, Arizona =

Populated place in Pima County, Arizona

- Populated Place
- Location within the state of Arizona Gurli Put Vo (the United States)
- Coordinates: 32°12′14″N 112°01′10″W
- Country: United States
- State: Arizona
- County: Pima
- Elevation: 2,018 ft (615 m)
- Time zone: UTC-7 (Mountain (MST))
  - Summer (DST): UTC-7 (MST)
- Area code: 520
- GNIS feature ID: 24444

Gurli Put Vo, (O'odham: Kelibaḑ Vo'oga) also known as Dead Old Mans Pond, Koli-pat-vooka, or Kolipatvooka, is a populated place situated in Pima County, Arizona, United States. The official name became Gurli Put Vo in 1941 in a decision by the Board on Geographic Names. It has an estimated elevation of 2,018 feet (615 m) above sea level.
