= Arlington, Arizona =

CDP in Maricopa County, Arizona

- Census-designated place
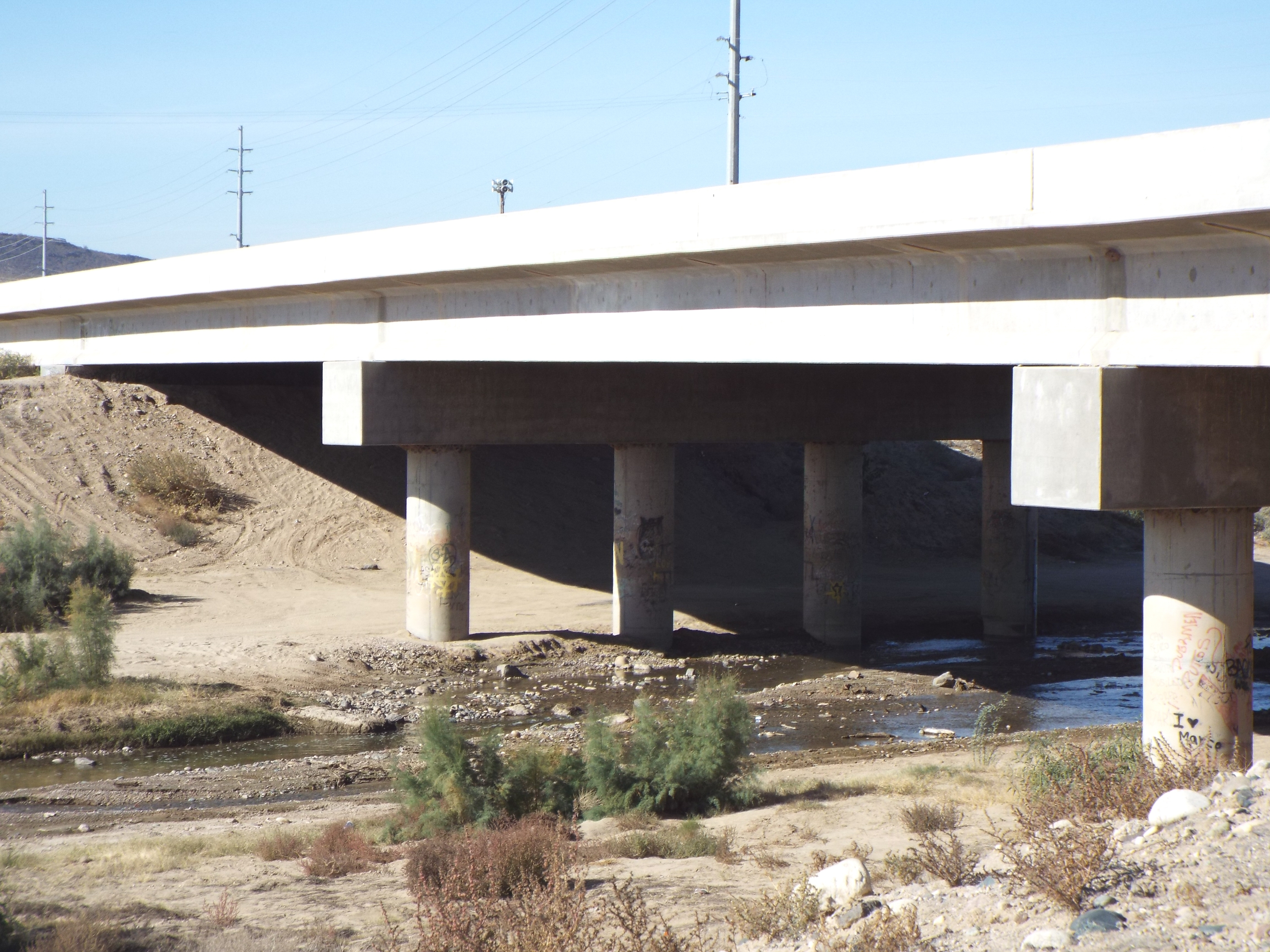
- The Hassayampa Bridge listed in the National Register of Historic Places, reference #88001658

- Location in Maricopa County, Arizona

- Location within Arizona Location within the United States
- Coordinates: 33°20′04″N 112°46′29″W
- Country: United States
- State: Arizona
- County: Maricopa

Area
  - Total: 2.29 sq mi (5.94 km^{2})
  - Land: 2.29 sq mi (5.94 km^{2})
  - Water: 0 sq mi (0.00 km^{2})
- Elevation: 827 ft (252 m)

Population (2020)
  - Total: 150
  - Density: 65.4/sq mi (25.27/km^{2})
- Time zone: UTC-7 (Mountain (MST))
- ZIP code: 85322
- FIPS code: 04-04020
- GNIS feature ID: 2582732

Arlington is an unincorporated community and census-designated place (CDP) in Maricopa County, Arizona, United States, located 43 miles (69 km) west of downtown Phoenix on old U.S. 80. It follows the street numbering system of Phoenix. As of the 2020 census, the population was 150, down from 194 at the 2010 census.

== Demographics ==
Historical population
Census	Pop.	Note	%±
1910	241		—
1920	299		24.1%
1930	451		50.8%
1960	25		—
2010	194		—
2020	150		−22.7%
U.S. Decennial Census

Arlington first appeared on the 1910 U.S. Census as a precinct of Maricopa County. It appeared again in 1920 as the 53rd precinct of Maricopa County (AKA Arlington). In 1930, it simply appeared as the Arlington Precinct again. It was recorded as having a White majority for that census The population was 25 in the 1960 census.

In 2010, it was made a census-designated place (CDP).

As of the census of 2010, there were 194 people living in the CDP. The population density was 82.8 people per square mile. The racial makeup of the CDP was 69.1% White, 0.5% Black or African American, 1.6% Native American, 24.2% from other races, and 4.6% from two or more races. 29.9% of the population were Hispanic or Latino of any race.

== Hassayampa Bridge ==
The historic Hassayampa River Bridge, listed on the National Register of Historic Places, is located nearby.

== Education ==
It is in the Arlington Elementary School District and the Buckeye Union High School District.
