= Kawaika-A, Arizona =

Populated place in Navajo County, Arizona

- Populated place
- Location within the state of Arizona Kawaika-A (the United States)
- Coordinates: 35°44′41″N 110°13′14″W
- Country: United States
- State: Arizona
- County: Navajo
- Elevation: 6,441 ft (1,963 m)
- Time zone: UTC-7 (Mountain (MST))
  - Summer (DST): UTC-7 (MST)
- Area code: 928
- FIPS code: 04-36940
- GNIS feature ID: 42872

Kawaika-A is a populated place situated in Navajo County, Arizona, United States.

From 1935 to 1939, the Peabody Museum of Archaeology and Ethnology of Harvard University conducted an archeological expedition of which this location was one of the primary sites, along with Awatovi. The expedition uncovered murals and wall paintings from the aboriginal American Southwest. Prior to settlement by European pioneers, the location was inhabited as early as 1500, but was deserted for unknown reasons by 1583. The name is derived from the Hopi name for the local inhabitants, the Kawaika.
