= Kom Vo, Arizona =

- Populated place
- Location within the state of Arizona Kom Vo (the United States)
- Coordinates: 31°57′35″N 112°20′56″W
- Country: United States
- State: Arizona
- County: Pima
- Elevation: 1,770 ft (540 m)
- Time zone: UTC-7 (Mountain (MST))
  - Summer (DST): UTC-7 (MST)
- Area code: 520
- FIPS code: 04-38740
- GNIS feature ID: 6765

Kom Vo is a populated place situated in Pima County, Arizona, United States. The name is derived from the Tohono O'odham ko:m wo'o, meaning "hackberry pond". Historically, it has also been known by Comeva, Comova, and Comovo, which are all variants with the same meaning. It has an estimated elevation of 1,772 feet (540 m) above sea level.
