= Kaihon Kug, Arizona =

- Populated place
- Location within the state of Arizona Kaihon Kug (the United States)
- Coordinates: 32°00′58″N 112°04′46″W
- Country: United States
- State: Arizona
- County: Pima
- Elevation: 2,000 ft (610 m)
- Time zone: UTC-7 (Mountain (MST))
  - Summer (DST): UTC-7 (MST)
- Area code: 520
- FIPS code: 04-36710
- GNIS feature ID: 6588

Kaihon Kug, also historically known as Old Quijotoa Well, is a populated place situated in Pima County, Arizona, United States. Kaihon Kug became officially recognized as its name by a decision of the Board on Geographic Names (BGN) in 1941. The name means "box stands" in the O'odham language, although kaihon is a borrowed word from the Spanish, cajon. At the time of the BGN decision, there was some discussion as to the spelling of the two words; the board decided to use the O'odham spelling for Kaihon, and chose Kug, rather than Kuk, to diminish any confusion with the O'odham word for "cries". It has an estimated elevation of 2,001 feet (610 m) above sea level. (Note: Details on the name decision can be found on the decision card, found at the GNIS link.)
