= Kirkland, Arizona =

Unincorporated community in Yavapai County, Arizona

- Unincorporated community
- Location within the state of Arizona Kirkland (the United States)
- Coordinates: 34°25′03″N 112°42′44″W
- Country: United States
- State: Arizona
- County: Yavapai
- Elevation: 3,931 ft (1,198 m)

Population (2000)
  - Total: 1,637
- Time zone: UTC-7 (Mountain (MST))
- ZIP codes: 86332
- Area code: 928
- GNIS feature ID: 30787

Kirkland is an unincorporated community in central Yavapai County, Arizona, United States, near the Weaver Mountains. It is southwest of the city of Prescott, the county seat of Yavapai County. Its elevation is 3,930 feet (1,198 m). Although Kirkland is unincorporated, it has a post office, with the ZIP code of 86332.

Kirkland is named after William Hudson Kirkland and is located at the intersection of Yavapai County Route 15, which runs east–west from Hillside to Arizona State Route 89 at Wilhoit, and Yavapai County Route 10, which runs north, than west to Prescott.

Kirkland is on the BNSF Railway's Phoenix Subdivision.

== Education ==
Kirkland Elementary School District is the local school district.

As of 1976 the Prescott Unified School District takes secondary students from the district, as it is required to under law. The Prescott district operates Prescott High School.

== Climate ==
According to the Köppen Climate Classification system, Kirkland has a semi-arid climate, abbreviated "BSk" on climate maps.
