= Pan Tak, Arizona =

- Populated place
- Location within the state of Arizona Pan Tak (the United States)
- Coordinates: 32°00′42″N 111°33′55″W
- Country: United States
- State: Arizona
- County: Pima
- Elevation: 3,410 ft (1,040 m)
- Time zone: UTC-7 (Mountain (MST))
  - Summer (DST): UTC-7 (MST)
- ZIP codes: 85634
- Area code: 520
- FIPS code: 04-52440
- GNIS feature ID: 24551

Pan Tak (O'odham: Ban Dak) is a populated place situated in Pima County, Arizona, United States. Throughout its existence, it has been known by a number of names, including Cajote Spring, Coyote, Coyote Indian Village, Coyote Spring, Coyote Village, Coyotes Spring, Ojo de los Coyotes, and Pantak. Pan Tak become the official name as a result of a Board on Geographic Names decision in 1941. The name comes from the O'odham, meaning "coyote sits". It has an estimated elevation of 3,412 feet (1,040 m) above sea level.
