= Kirkland Elementary School District =

School district in Arizona, United States

Address
- 150 Main Street Kirkland, Arizona, 86332; United States

District information
- Type: Public
- Grades: PreK–8
- NCES District ID: 0404170

Students and staff
- Students: 85
- Teachers: 6.0
- Staff: 9.4
- Student–teacher ratio: 14.17

Other information
- Website: www.kirklandaz.org

Kirkland Elementary School District #23 is a school district based in Kirkland, Arizona, consisting of a single K-8 school.

The district includes Wilhoit census-designated place, as well as the unincorporated areas of Kirkland, Wagoner and Walnut Grove.

The school was established circa 1909. As of 2019 the school district has little of a taxation base, so much of the taxes comes from residents. The residents lacked the tax money to rebuild the school, though the current building had modern technology.

As of 1976 the Prescott Unified School District takes secondary students from the district, as it is required to under law. The Prescott district operates Prescott High School.

Until its 2021 disestablishment, Walnut Grove Elementary School District, which did not operate any schools at the end of its life, sent students seeking traditional schooling to Kirkland Elementary. The Kirkland district absorbed the parts of the Walnut Grove district to the north.
