= Kom Kug, Arizona =

- Populated place
- Location within the state of Arizona Kom Kug (the United States)
- Coordinates: 31°36′38″N 110°40′15″W
- Country: United States
- State: Arizona
- County: Pima
- Elevation: 3,199 ft (975 m)
- Time zone: UTC-7 (Mountain (MST))
  - Summer (DST): UTC-7 (MST)
- Area code: 520
- FIPS code: 04-38670
- GNIS feature ID: 30809

Kom Kug is a populated place situated in Pima County, Arizona, United States. It has an estimated elevation of 3,199 feet (975 m) above sea level. The name is derived from the Tohono O'odham ko:m ke:k, meaning "hackberry standing".
