= Fresnal Canyon =

Canyon in the Baboquivari Mountains of Arizona

Coordinates: 31.827304°N 111.6403905°W

Fresnal Canyon is a canyon in the Baboquivari Mountains in Pima County, Arizona. This locale has been a notable place for the archaeological recovery of pre-ceramic Native American habitation. This canyon has a number of native flora and fauna, including the elephant tree (Bursera fagaroides). The canyon is within the Tohono O'odham Nation lands.
