= Gu Chuapo, Arizona =

Populated place in Pima County, Arizona

- Populated Place
- Location within the state of Arizona Gu Chuapo (the United States)
- Coordinates: 31°53′40″N 111°39′52″W
- Country: United States
- State: Arizona
- County: Pima
- Elevation: 3,465 ft (1,056 m)
- Time zone: UTC-7 (Mountain (MST))
  - Summer (DST): UTC-7 (MST)
- Area code: 520
- FIPS code: 04-30315
- GNIS feature ID: 24443

Gu Chuapo is a populated place situated in Pima County, Arizona, United States. It has an estimated elevation of 3,465 feet (1,056 m) above sea level.
