= Glenbar, Arizona =

Populated place in Graham County, Arizona

- Populated Place
- Location within the state of Arizona Glenbar (the United States)
- Coordinates: 32°55′00″N 109°51′29″W
- Country: United States
- State: Arizona
- County: Graham
- Elevation: 2,802 ft (854 m)
- Time zone: UTC-7 (Mountain (MST))
  - Summer (DST): UTC-7 (MST)
- Area code: 928
- FIPS code: 27750
- GNIS feature ID: 5058

Glenbar is a populated place situated in Graham County, Arizona, United States.
