= Hassayampa River =

River in Arizona, United States

Coordinates: 33.9327121°N 112.6972566°W

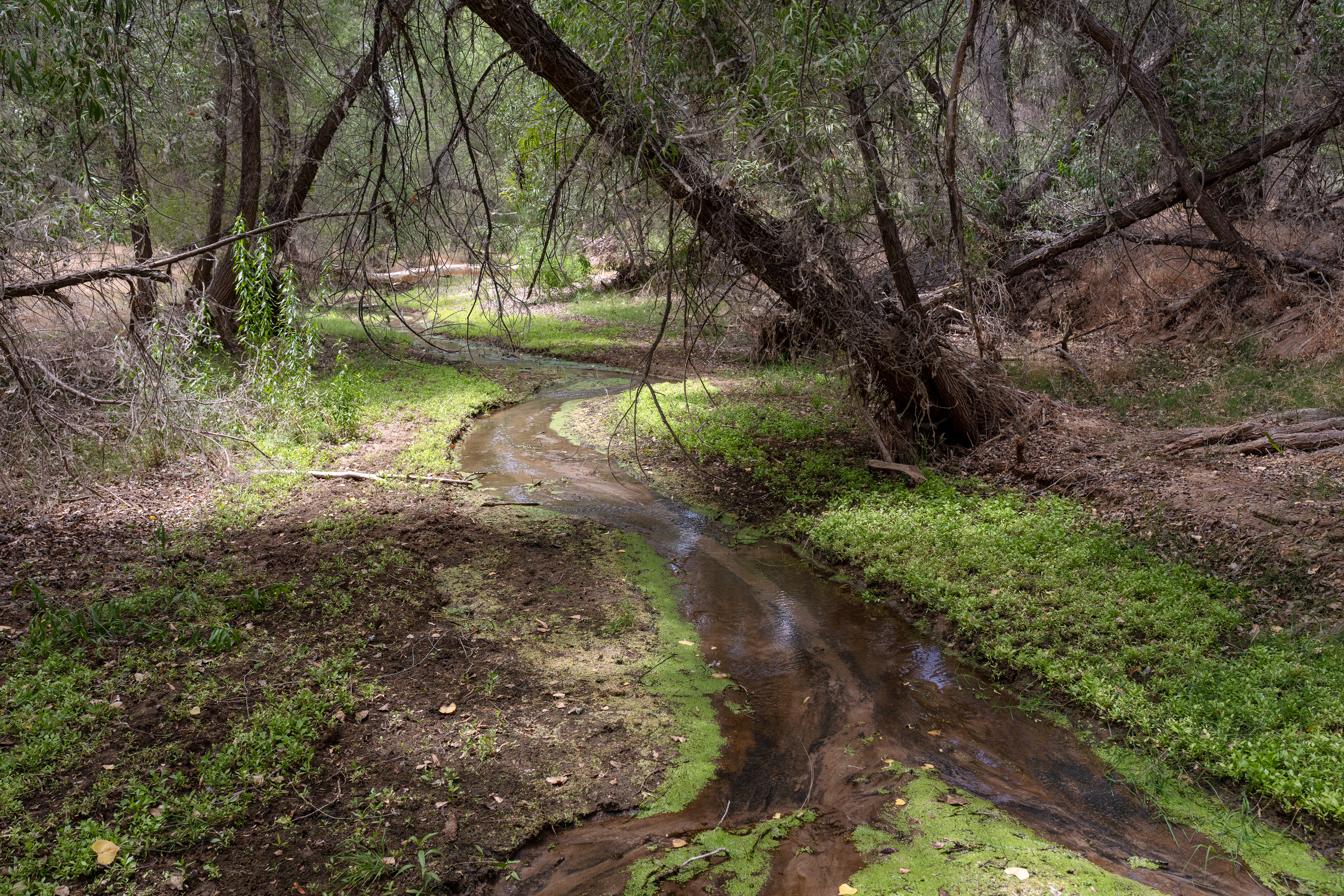
- Hassayampa River at the Nature Conservancy's Hassayampa River Preserve, near Wickenburg, Arizona

Location
- Country: United States
- State: Arizona

Physical characteristics
- Source
  - location: near Prescott, Arizona
- Mouth
  - location: Gila River

The Hassayampa River (Yavapai: Hasaya:mvo or ʼHasayamcho:) is an intermittent river, the headwaters of which are just south of Prescott, Arizona, and flows mostly south towards Wickenburg, entering the Gila River near Hassayampa. Although the river has only subsurface flow for much of the year, it has significant perennial flows above ground within the Hassayampa River Canyon Wilderness and the Nature Conservancy's Hassayampa River Preserve, near Wickenburg. The river is about 113 miles (182 km) long, with a watershed of 1,410 square miles (3,700 km^{2}), most of it desert.

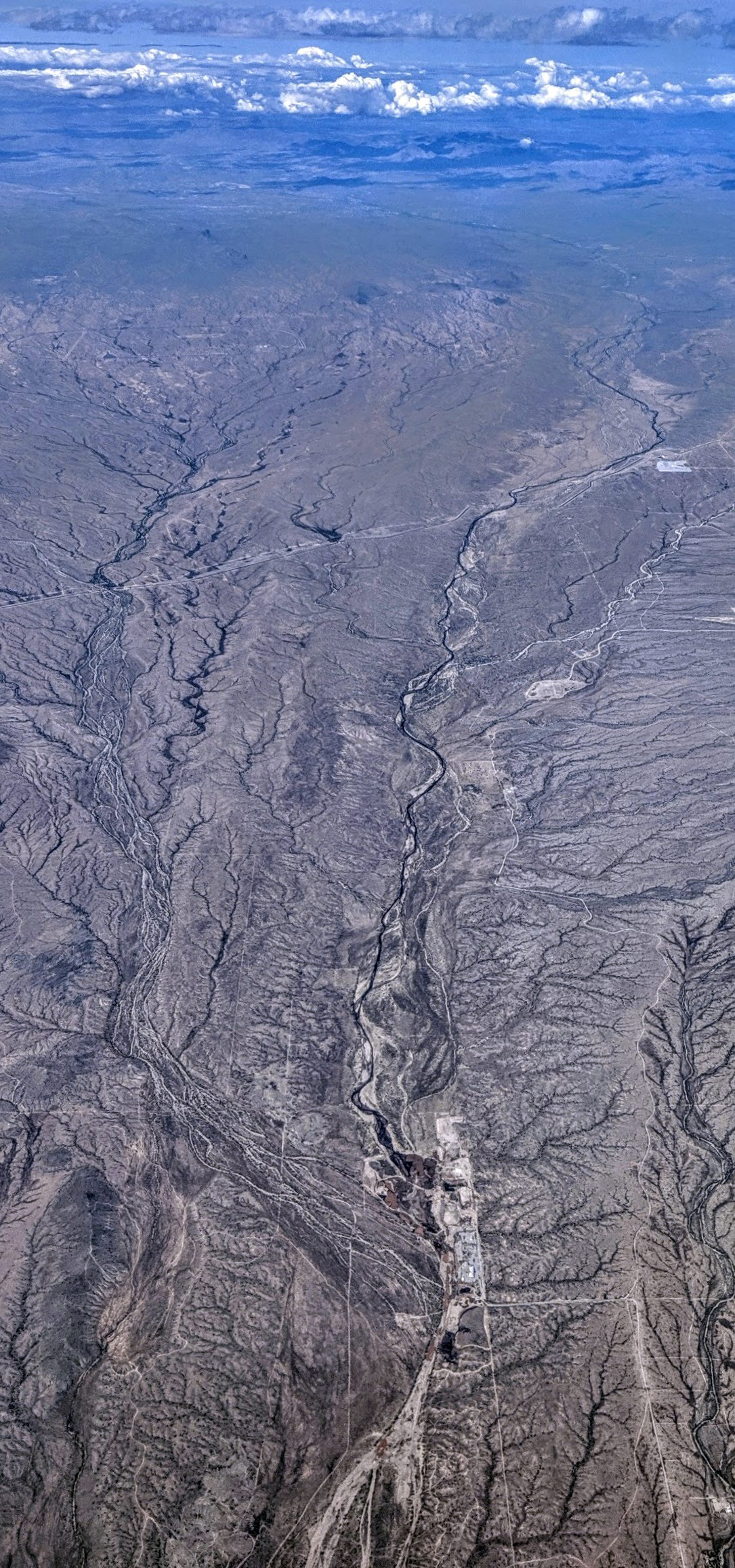
Aerial view from the south of the Hassayampa River, Arizona, northwest of Phoenix

A local legend purports that anyone who drinks from the river can never again tell the truth. As an anonymous poet wrote:

Those who drink its waters bright –
Red man, white man, boor or knight,
Girls or women, boys or men –
Never tell the truth again

The legend came about from the gold rush era. The reports of gold strikes from the area were so overexaggerated that the Legend of the Hassayampa was born. Those telling the tall tales were labeled “Hassayampers”.

Riparian habitats along the Hassayampa River support numerous desert species, including wildlife dependent on streamside ecosystems. In the Sonoran Desert, these areas support cottonwood–willow forests, which are among North America’s rarest and most threatened forest types. An estimated 90 percent of Arizona’s riparian landscapes have been lost, damaged, or degraded, affecting habitats used by approximately 80 percent of the state’s wildlife.

The Hassayampa River was the location of the 1890 Walnut Grove Dam failure, which led to over 100 fatalities along the river.

== See also ==
- List of rivers of Arizona
