= List of passenger train stations in Arizona =

Historic and existing passenger train stations in Arizona, United States.

Station	Railway	Built	Notes
Aguila		1905	Originally Arizona and California Railway depot. Last Santa Fe service 1955. Moved to Scottsdale's McCormick-Stillman Railroad Park in 1972. Still standing.
Ajo	TC&GB	1916	Last mixed passenger service in 1984. Still standing.
Ash Fork	ATSF	1907	Escalante Harvey House and depot built 1907. Last passenger service 1969. Razed 1984. Freight station still stands as Burlington Northern Santa Fe maintenance-of-way crew house.
Benson	SPRR	1880	Last passenger service 1971. Razed 1970s. Replica of depot building constructed on this location in early 2000s for Chamber of Commerce. Amtrak's Sunset Limited and Texas Eagle stop at a shed nearby.
Benson	SPSR		Portable-module structure located one mile south of downtown. Current offices of the San Pedro and Southwestern Railroad, a 7-mile-long (11 km) freight railroad. Passenger facilities were located at depot from 1995 to 2000, when previous San Pedro and Southwestern Railway-owned railroad offered Grey Hawk passenger excursions from Benson-Charleston along the San Pedro River. Depot office Still standing.
Bowie			
Buckeye			
Casa Grande	SPRR	1879	New depot built 1924. Last passenger service 1960s. Destroyed in a fire in 2009.
Chandler	SPRR	1911	Last passenger service 1964. Razed 1970s. The Arizona Railway Museum built a similar building nearby as its headquarters.
Clarkdale	ATSF	1912	Built by Verde Valley Railway. Last Santa Fe mixed passenger service 1955. Depot destroyed in a fire 1970s. Verde Canyon Railroad tourist train service returned in November 1990; new depot built in 1996 by the Durbano family.
Clifton	SPRR	1913	Built by Arizona and New Mexico Railway. Last Southern Pacific mixed passenger service 1967. Still standing. Replica of this depot built in late 1990s at Scottsdale's McCormick-Stillman Railroad Park.
Cochise		1905	Moved to 1825 West Dragoon Road within the town limits of Cochise and is now the Cochise Marijuana Dispensary.
Coolidge		1925	Closed 1973, razed later in the 1970s. Last Amtrak passenger service at nearby shed, 1996.
Dome			
Douglas	SPRR	1913	Built by El Paso and Southwestern Railroad. Last Southern Pacific passenger service 1963. The San Pedro and Southwestern Railroad briefly used the depot from 1992 to 1995 for a crew terminal, prior to abandonment of their Paul Spur-Douglas trackage. Still stands as City of Douglas Police Department.
Dragoon			
Drake		1901	Name changed from Cedar Glade, 1920. Last passenger services 1955 and 1969. Depot moved to Prescott in 1970s and is now a gift shop at 1533 Iron Springs Road adjacent to Hillside Station at 1531 Iron Springs Road.
Eloy			
Estrella			
Flagstaff	ATSF	1889	Built by Atlantic and Pacific Railroad. Restored 1999 as a new office. Santa Fe depot built 1926, last Santa Fe passenger service 1971. Currently served by Amtrak's Southwest Chief. Both still stand.
Florence	SPRR		
Fortuna	SPRR		
Fort Thomas	SPRR		
Gila Bend	SPRR	1915	Last Southern Pacific passenger service 1960s. Last Tucson, Cornelia and Gila Bend Railroad mixed passenger service 1984. Depot razed 1970s.
Gilbert	SPRR		
Glendale	ATSF	1895	Original depot built by Santa Fe, Prescott and Phoenix Railway. Closed 1961. New depot built 1959. Last Santa Fe passenger service 1969. Still standing.
Globe	SPRR	1916	Built by Arizona Eastern Railway. Last passenger service 1953. Still standing. Was served by Arizona Eastern Railway's Copper Spike excursion motorcar in 2006.
Grand Canyon	GCRX	1904	Built by Santa Fe and Grand Canyon Railroad. Last Santa Fe passenger service July 1968. Restored by National Park Service, 1987. Excursion service began September 1989 by Grand Canyon Railway.
Grand Canyon	ATSF	1905	El Tovar Harvey House. Designed by Santa Fe Railway architect Charles Whittlesey. Still standing. Currently owned by National Park Service and operated by Xanterra.
Grand Canyon	ATSF	1935	Bright Angel Lodge. Designed by renowned architect Elizabeth Jane Colter (Mary E. J. Colter). Still standing. Currently owned by National Park Service and operated by Xanterra.
Hayden	SPRR		
Hillside	SFP&P	1902	Last passenger service 1969. Depot moved to Prescott 1970s, now a restaurant adjacent to Drake Station gift shop in Iron Southern Pacificrings Road.
Holbrook	ATSF	1892	Built by Atlantic and Pacific Railroad. Enlarged 1907, 1912. Last Santa Fe passenger service 1971. Still standing. Restored in 2006.
Hyder	SPRR	1926	Opened as Agua. Last passenger service 1944. Razed in 1950s. Site of still-unsolved 1995 derailment of Amtrak's Sunset Limited.
Jerome	VT&S	c. 1919	Passenger service consisted of intermittent traffic via rail bus. Entire railroad abandoned in 1953. Depot still stands on Phelps Dodge property in a fenced-in area at the Jerome Open Pit. Current Photo #1#2
Kingman	ATSF	1907	Last Santa Fe passenger service 1971. Currently served by Amtrak's Southwest Chief. Restored in 2007.
Kingman		1901	Harvey House. Renovated for use by soldiers training at Kingman Airfield in 1942. A fire destroyed all interiors in 1952, and it was razed a year later.
Litchfield	SPRR	1926	Built to serve the communities of Goodyear, Avondale and Litchfield Park. Last passenger service unknown. Still stands, vacant on property near tracks in Avondale.
Maricopa		1879	The earliest depot was a two-story wooden building with deep eaves and prominent brick chimneys. Later razed, it was replaced in the 1930s by a small clapboard depot that was moved to Scottsdale's McCormick-Stillman Railroad Park in 2004. Amtrak has stopped at a new portable structure nearby since late 1990s.
Mesa	SPRR	1931	Last passenger service 1971. The 1980 "Hattie B" flood relief train served this station. Burned, January 1989.
Mescal	SPRR		
Miami	SPRR	1920s	Built by Arizona Eastern Railway. Last Southern Pacific mixed passenger service, 1953. Still standing.
Nogales	SPRR	1914	Last mixed passenger service, 1951. Razed, 1963 for an enlarged border crossing.
Parker	ATSF	1907	Built by Arizona and California Railroad. Last Santa Fe passenger service 1955. Still in use by Arizona and California Railroad as a company office.
Patagonia	SPRR	1900	Built by New Mexico & Arizona Railroad. Last Southern Pacific passenger service 1962. Still standing. Restored in 1990s and 2000s.
Peoria	ATSF	1895	Built by Santa Fe, Prescott and Phoenix Railway. Last Santa Fe passenger service 1969. Moved to Scottsdale's McCormick-Stillman Railroad Park, 1972. Still standing.
Perkinsville	ATSF	1912	Built by Verde Valley Railroad. Last Santa Fe mixed passenger service, 1955. Verde Canyon Railroad passenger service returned adjacent to depot in November 1990. Privately owned by Perkins Family Ranch. Still standing.
Phoenix Union Station	ATSF/SPRR	1923	Last Santa Fe passenger service, April 1969. Last Southern Pacific service May 1971. Last Amtrak service, June 1996. Still standing. Restored in 1990s and 2000s; currently owned by a telecommunications company.
Phoenix	SFP&P	1895	Closed 1923.
Phoenix	SFP&P	early 1910s	Second depot. Closed 1950s.
Phoenix	AZER/M&P	1800s?	Closed 1950s.
Prescott	ATSF	1907	Built by Santa Fe, Prescott and Phoenix Railway. Last Santa Fe passenger service April 1962. Still standing.
Picacho	SPRR		
Pima	SPRR		
Ray Junction	SPRR		
Red Rock	SPRR	1917	Built to Two-Story Combination Depot No. 22 plan by Southern Pacific. Last passenger service unknown. Still stands as residence near tracks in community of Red Rock, northwest Tucson.
Rillito	SPRR		Last passenger service unknown. Still stands vacant adjacent to tracks in northwest Tucson.
Safford	AZER/SPRR	1928	Last Southern Pacific passenger service 1953. Still standing.
Salome	ATSF	1905	Built by Arizona and California Railroad. Last Santa Fe passenger service 1955. Removed by October 2021.
San Simon	SPRR		
Seligman	ATSF	1897	El Havasu Harvey House. Built by Atlantic and Pacific Railroad. Last Santa Fe passenger service 1971. Last Amtrak service 1984. Demolished, 2008.
Sentinel	SPRR		
Steins	SPRR		
Stockham	SPRR		
Skull Valley	P&E	1895	Moved from Cherry Creek, 1926. Last passenger service, April 1969. Currently used as town museum.
Superior	MAA	1923	Last mixed passenger service 1940. Razed by BHP-Billiton and Resolution Copper Company in early 2000s.
Tempe	SPRR	1924	Last Amtrak service, June 1996. Still stands; used as Macayo's Depot Cantina restaurant. Valley Metro Rail station located one block east of depot.
Tombstone	SPRR	1882	Built by El Paso and Southwestern Railroad. Last Southern Pacific passenger service, August 1960. Still standing.
Tucson		1907	Remodeled 1942. Current Amtrak service. Restored in early 2000s, now features restaurants, shops and Southern Arizona Transportation Museum.
Tucson	EP&SW	1913	Last passenger service 1960s. Still stands; was used as a restaurant. Vacant in 2007.
Wellton	SPRR		
Wickenburg	ATSF	1895	Built by Santa Fe, Prescott and Phoenix Railway. Last Santa Fe passenger service April 1969. Still stands; used as Wickenburg Chamber of Commerce.
Willcox	SPRR	1914	Last passenger service 1971. Restored by city, 1999.
Williams	A&P	1885	Last passenger service 1908. Still stands; used as Williams Chamber of Commerce since 1994.
Williams	ATSF	1908	Last passenger service December 1960. Still stands; used by Grand Canyon Railway as their terminal since 1989. Owned and operated by Xanterra since 2007.
Williams	ATSF	1908	Fray Marcos Harvey House. Last hotel patrons in 1954. Purchased and restored in 1989 by Biegert Family. Still stands; used by Grand Canyon Railway as their gift shop, offices, dispatching, commissary and storage since 1989. Modern Grand Canyon Railway Hotel opened in 1995 to the north of 1908 structure. Owned and operated by Xanterra since 2007.
Williams Junction	ATSF	1960	Last passenger service April 1969. Razed 1984. Platform rebuilt 1999 for restored Amtrak Southwest Chief service and connecting bus shuttle to Williams Grand Canyon Railway depot.
Winslow	ATSF	1930	Last Santa Fe passenger service 1971. Currently served by Amtrak.
Winslow	ATSF	1929	La Posada Harvey House. Designed by renowned architect Elizabeth Jane Colter (Mary E. J. Colter). Last hotel patrons in 1957. Still standing. Housed Santa Fe dispatching offices until spring 1995. Purchased and restored in 1997 by the Affeldt/Mion familyand converted to a hotel. Served by Amtrak and U.S. Route 66.
Yuma	SPRR	1926	Housed the Yuma Fine Arts Museum after 1971. Burned 1995. Current Amtrak services at nearby platform.

== Gallery ==
Images of some of the remaining railroad stations in Arizona.

Railroad stations in Arizona
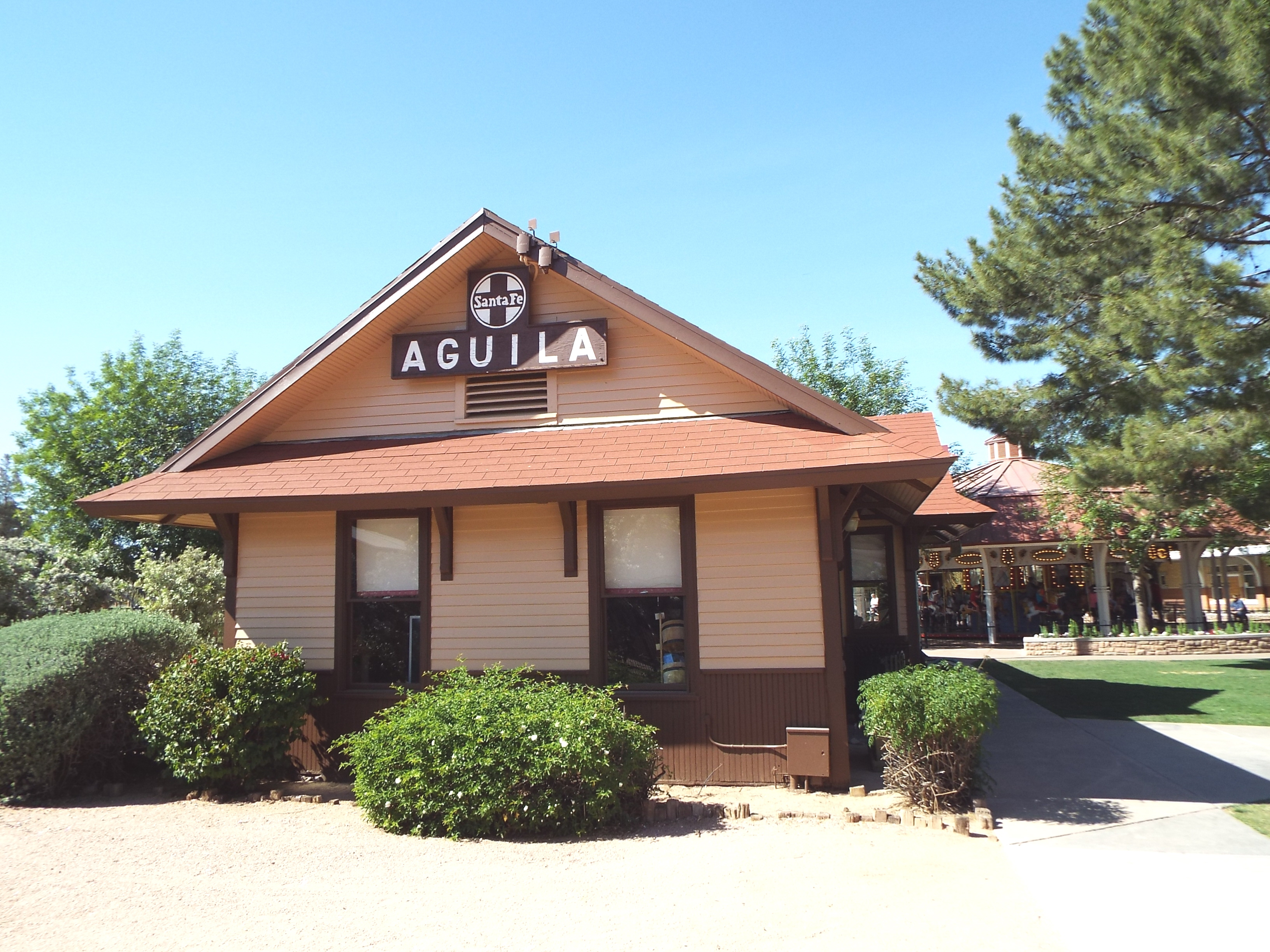
Aguila

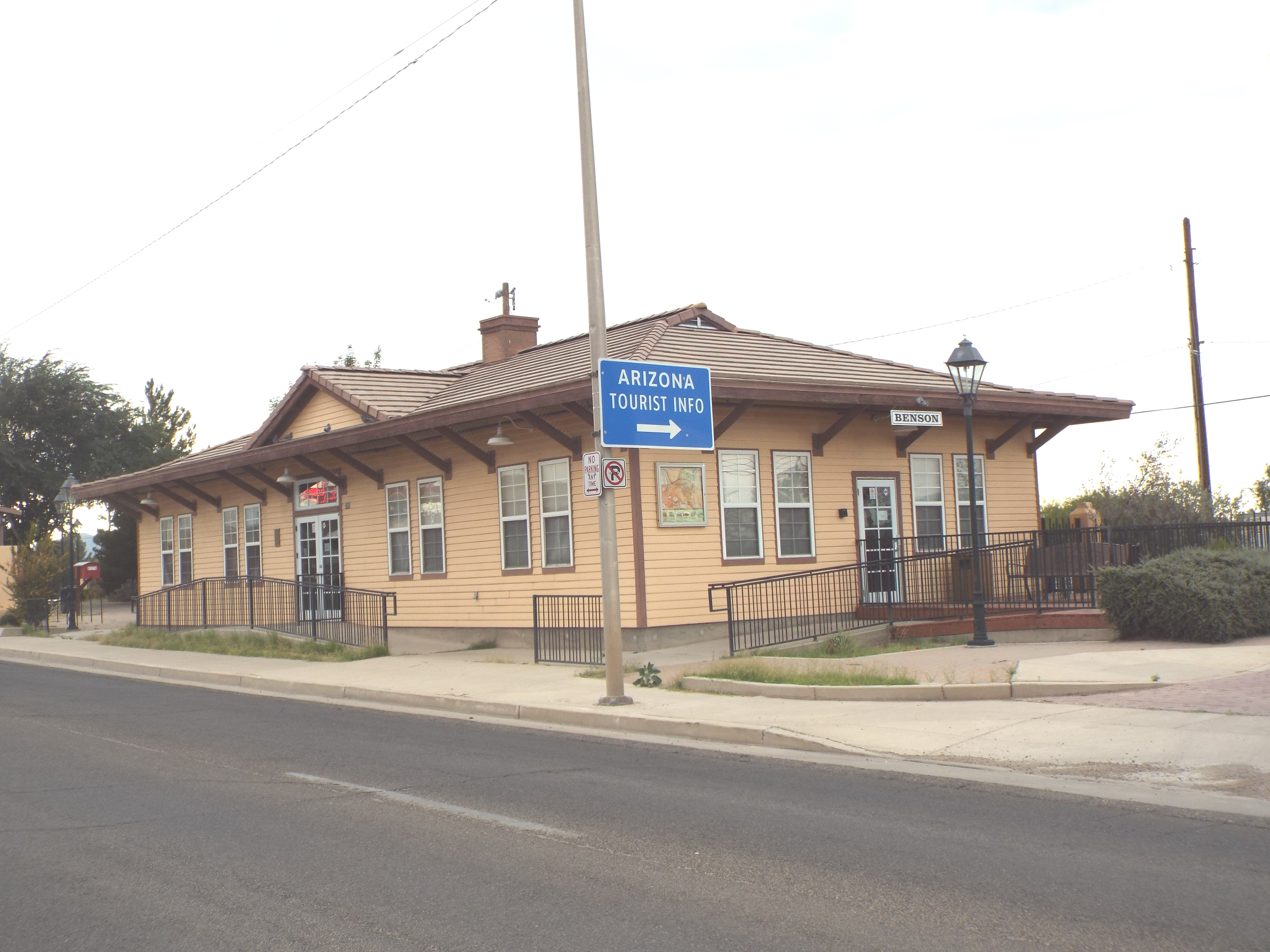
Benson

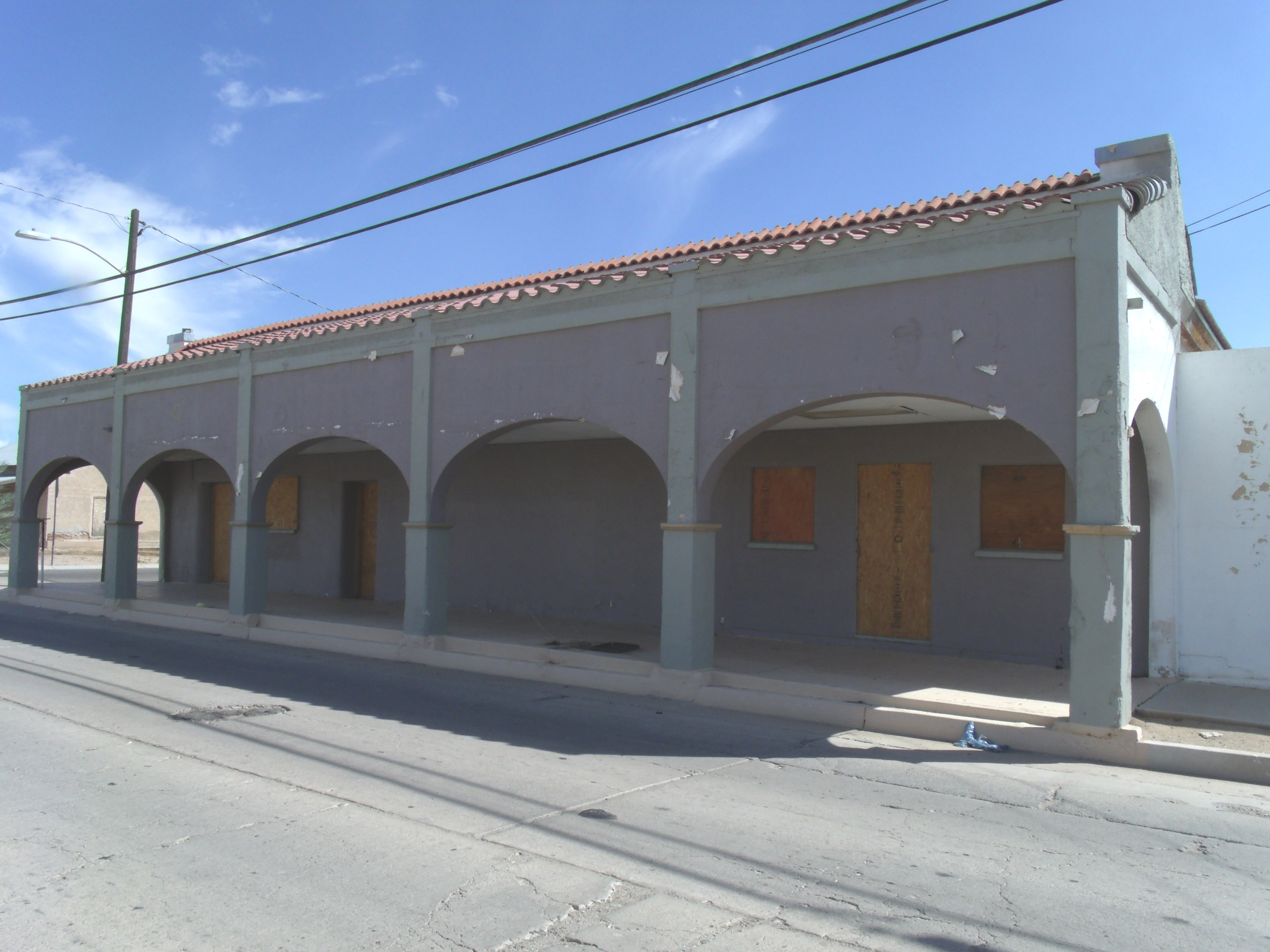
Casa Grande

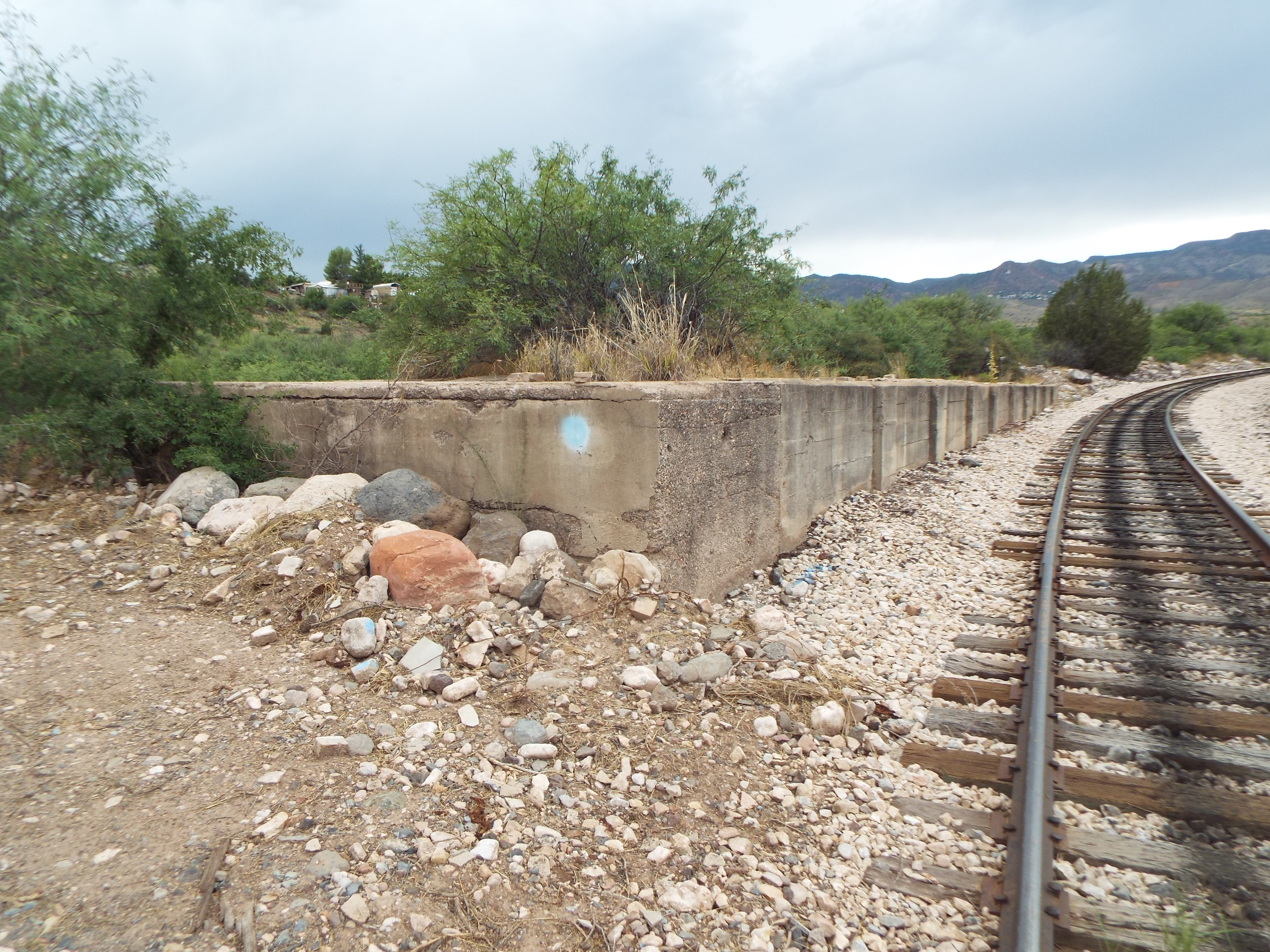
Clarkdale
Depot ruins

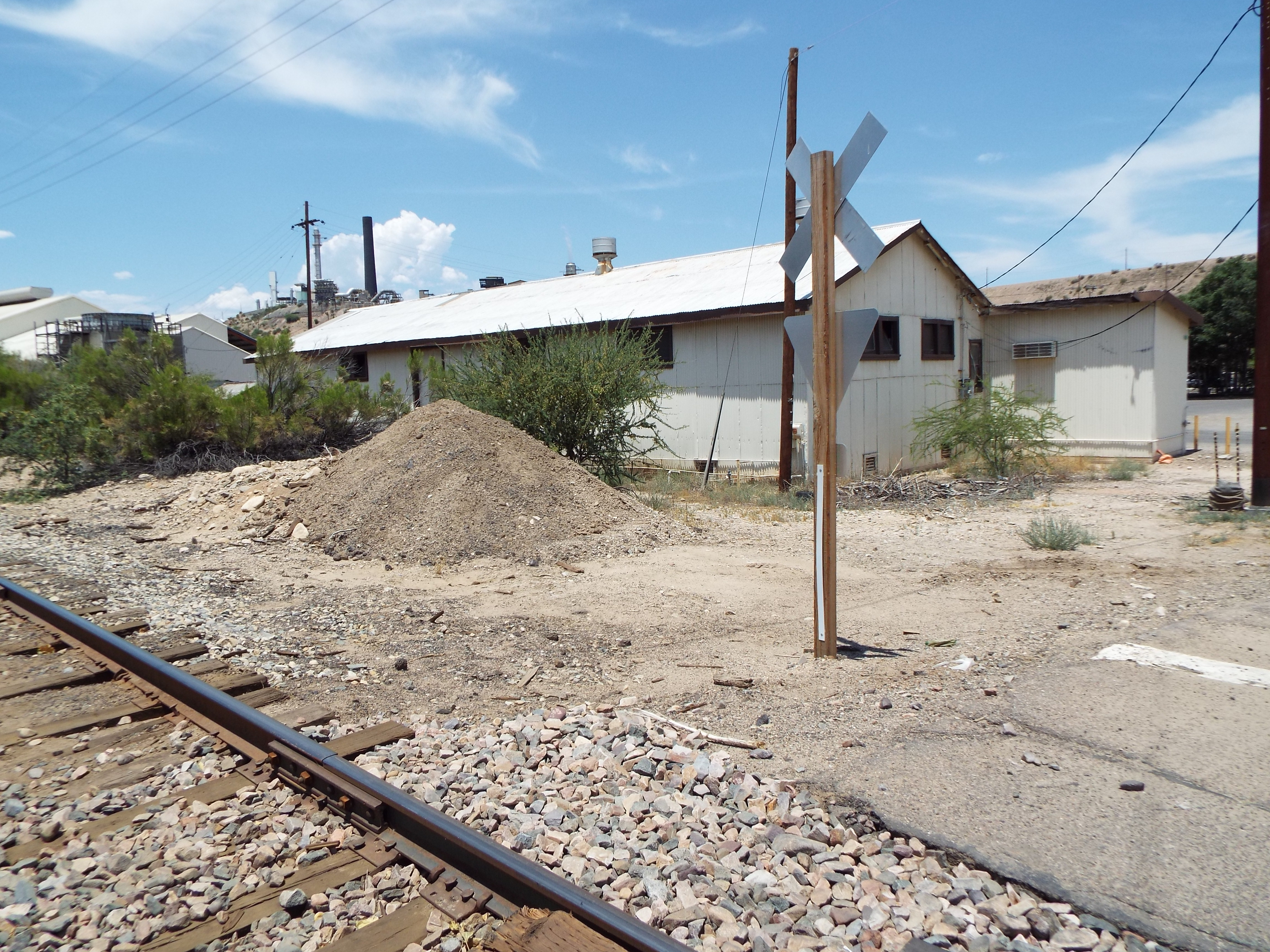
Claypool

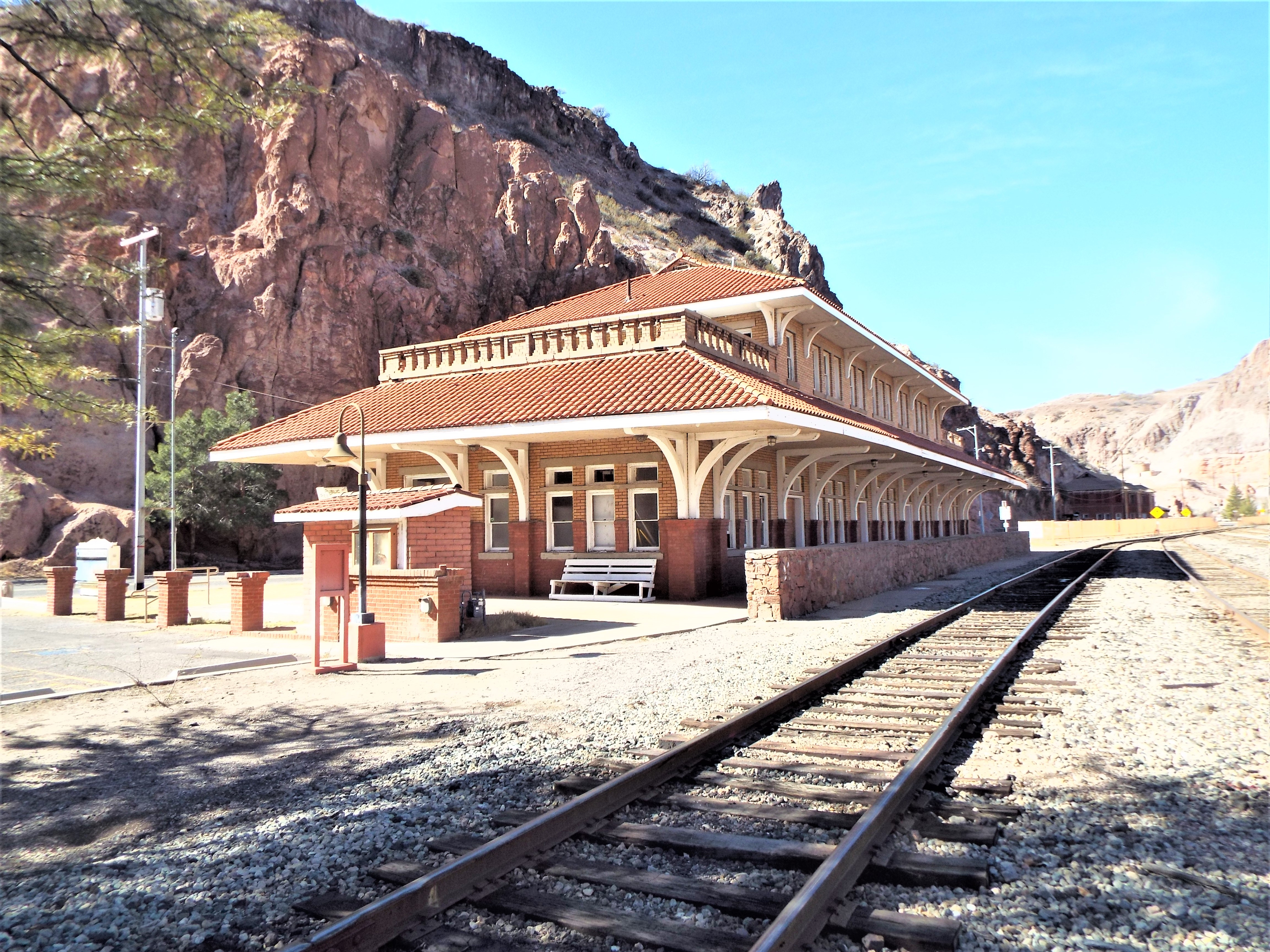
Clifton

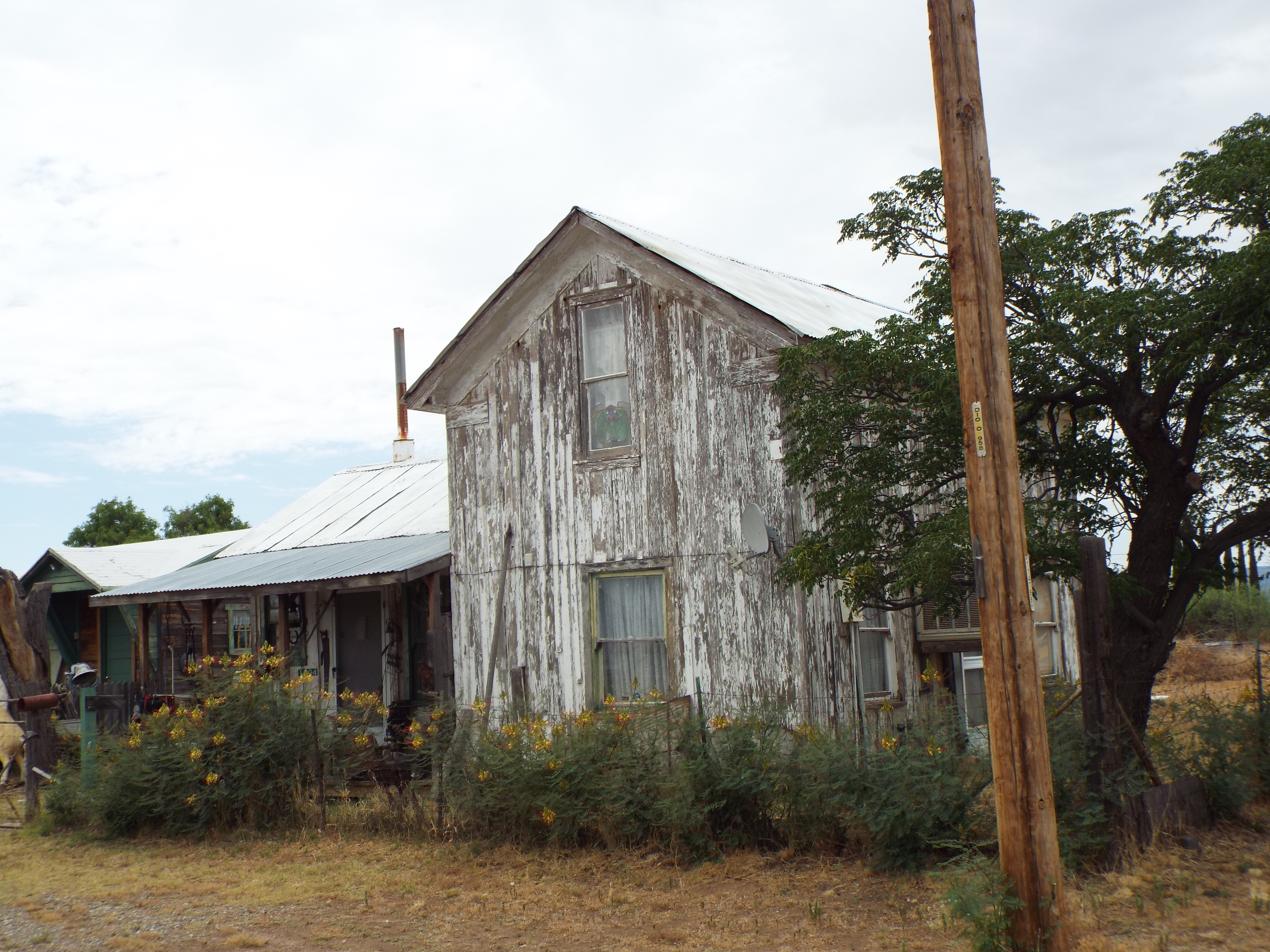
Cochise

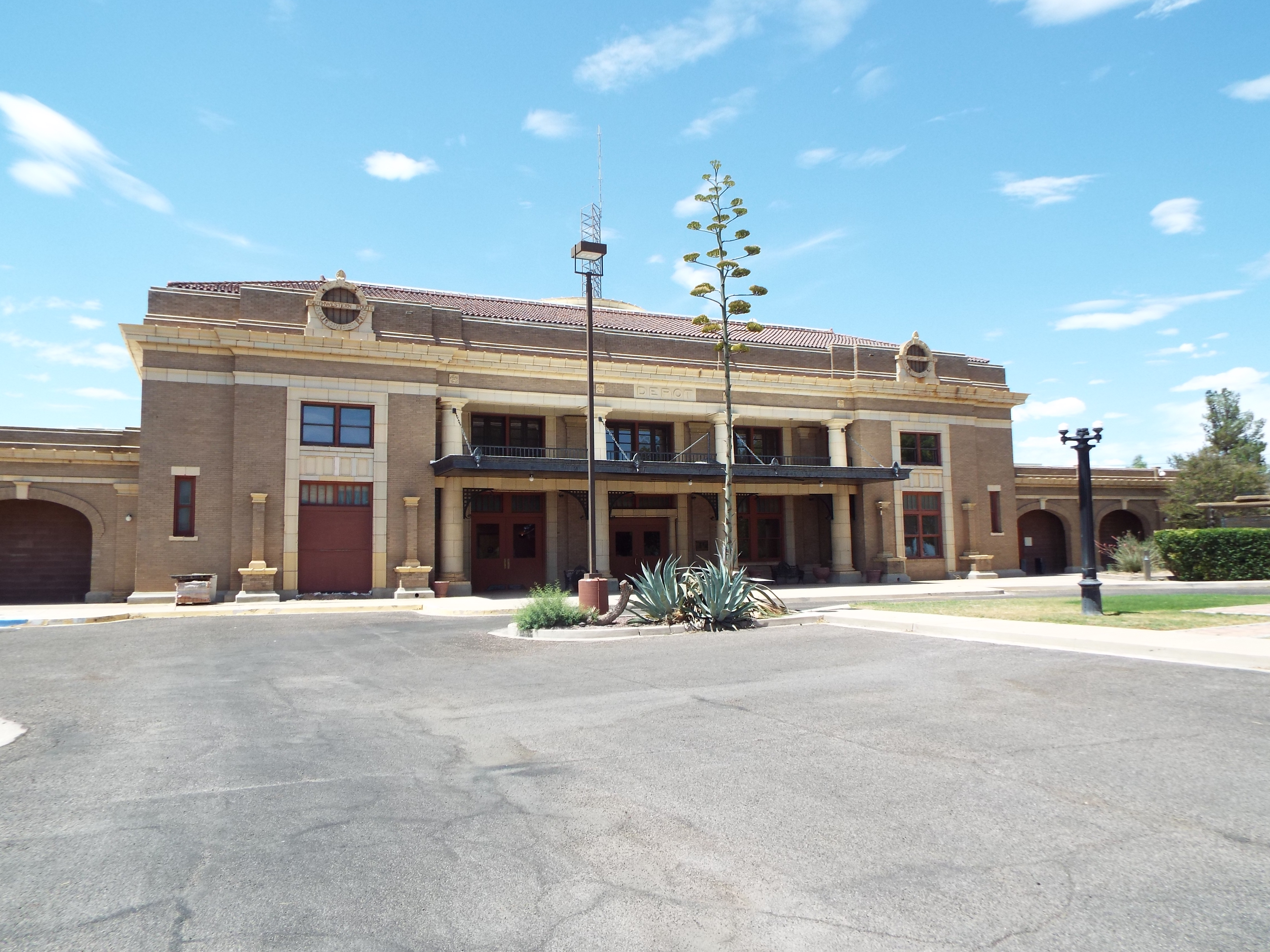
Douglas

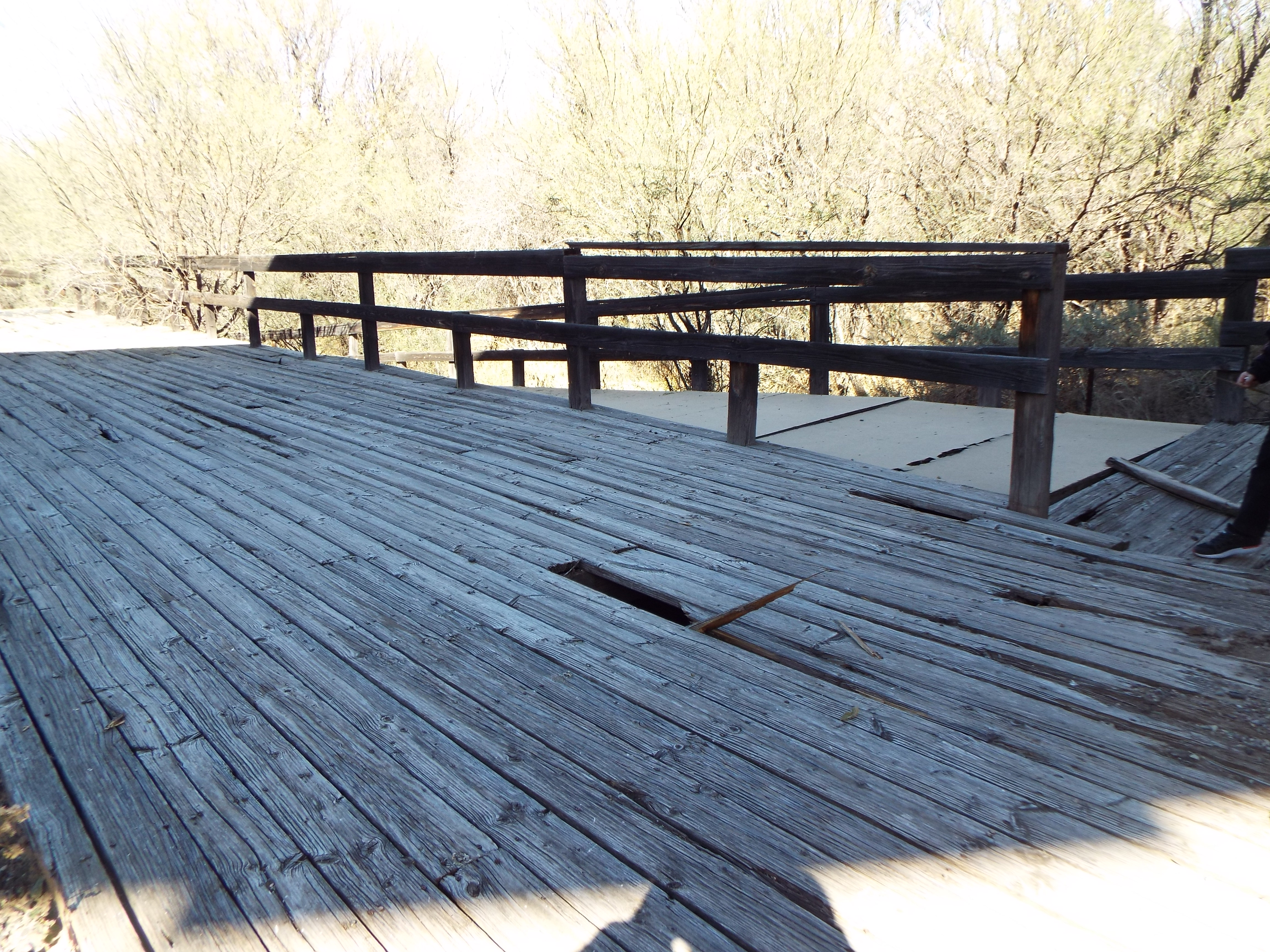
Fairbank
Depot ruins

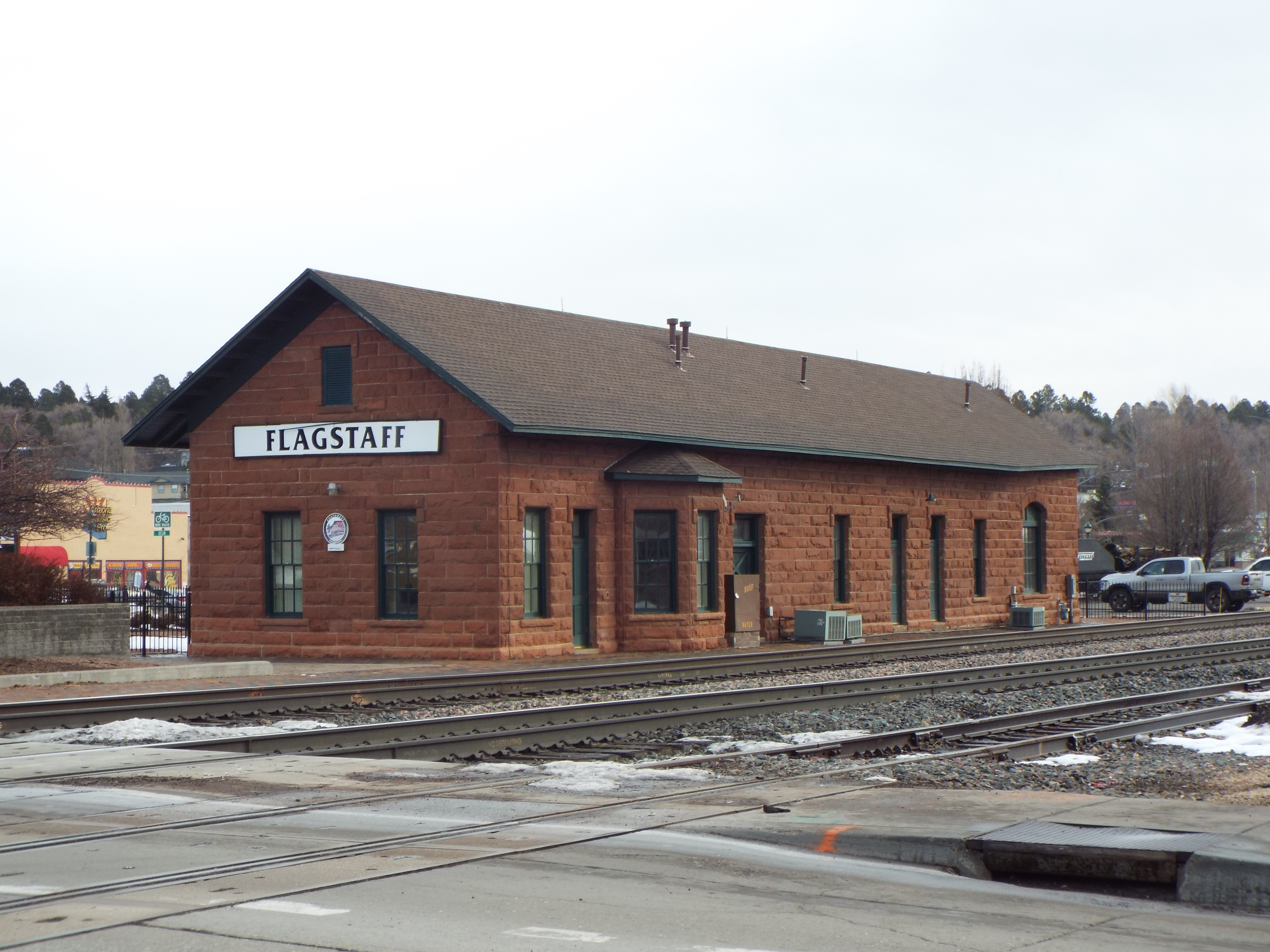
Flagstaff

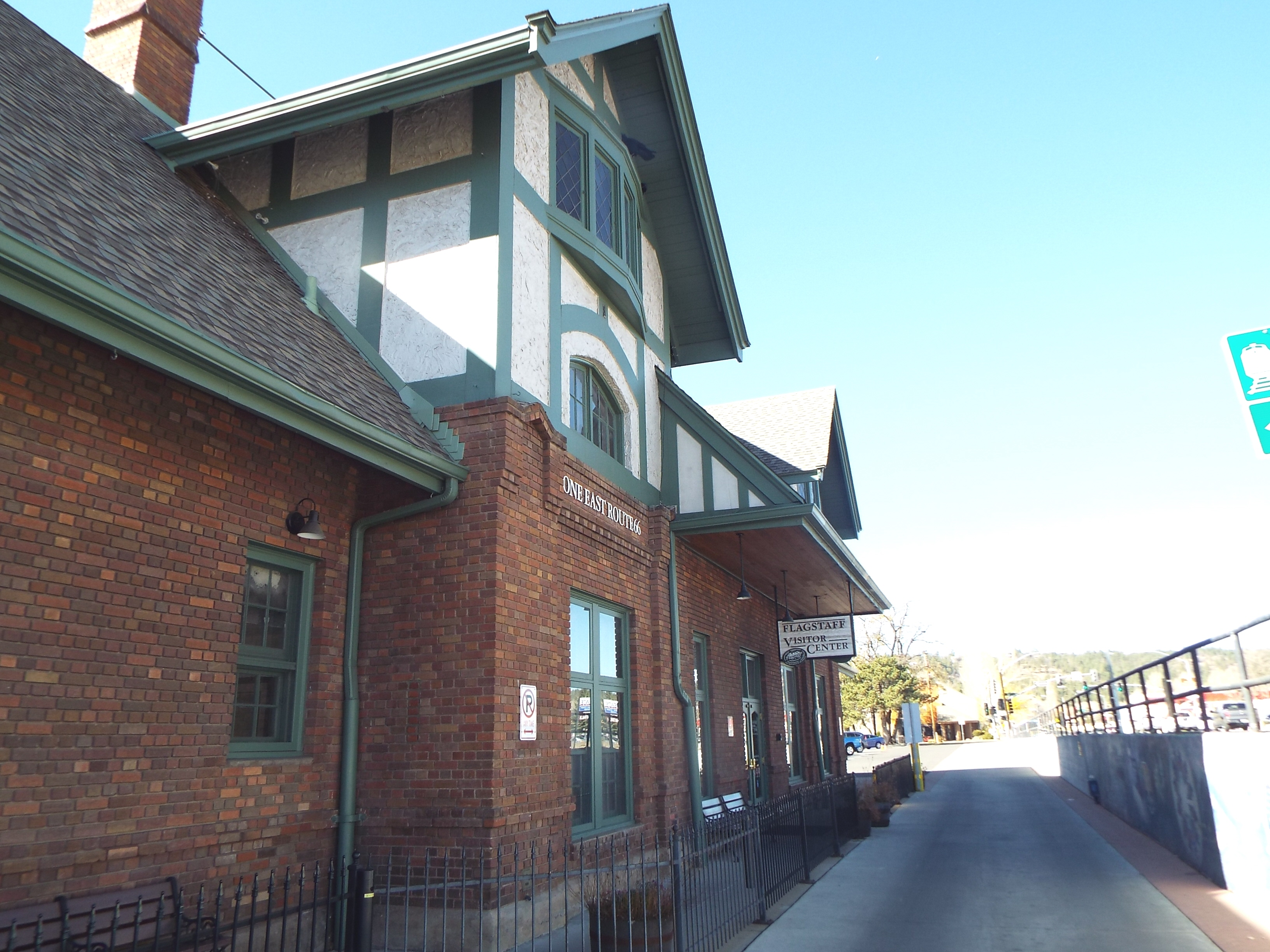
Flagstaff

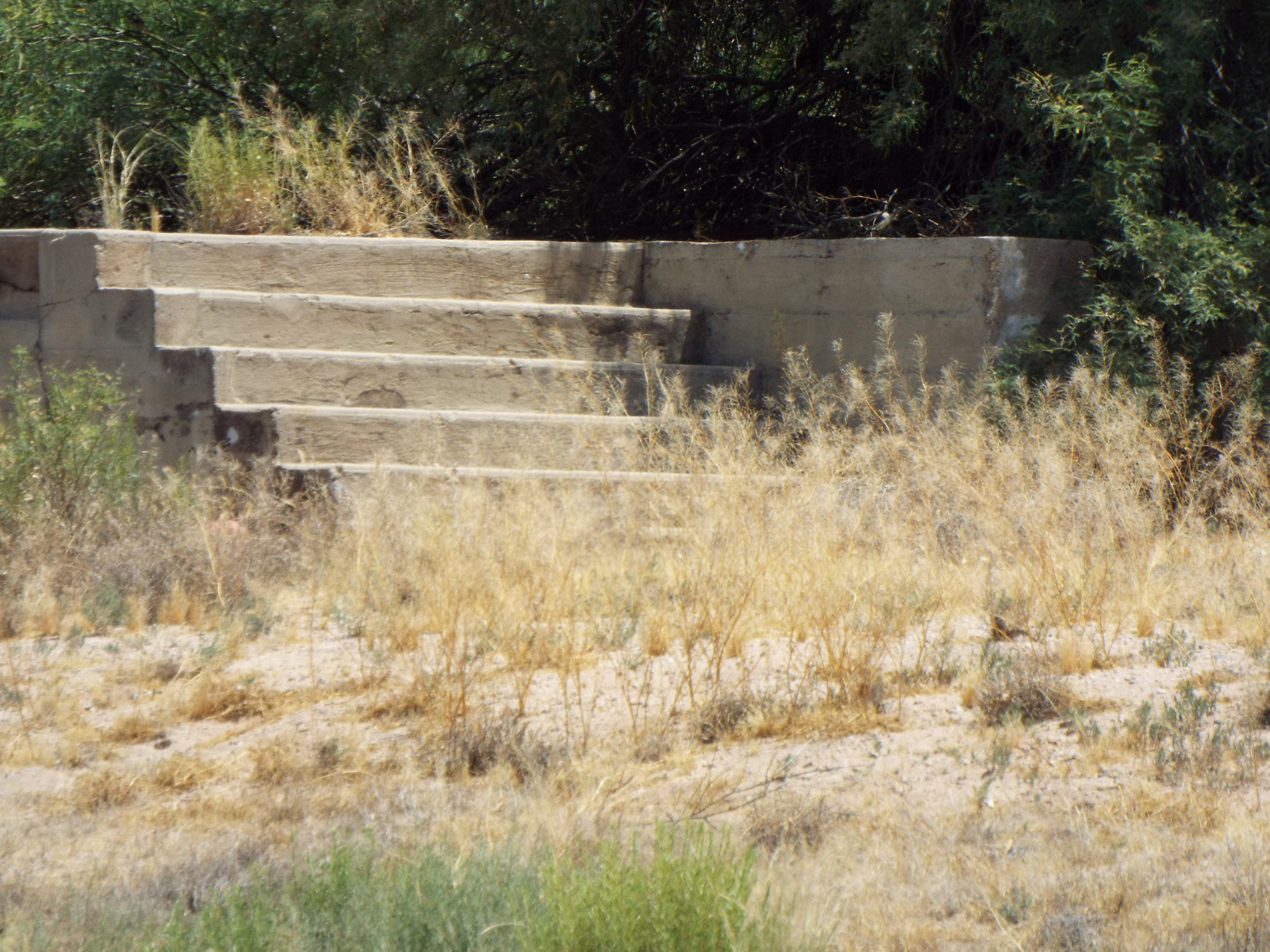
Fort Thomas
Depot ruins

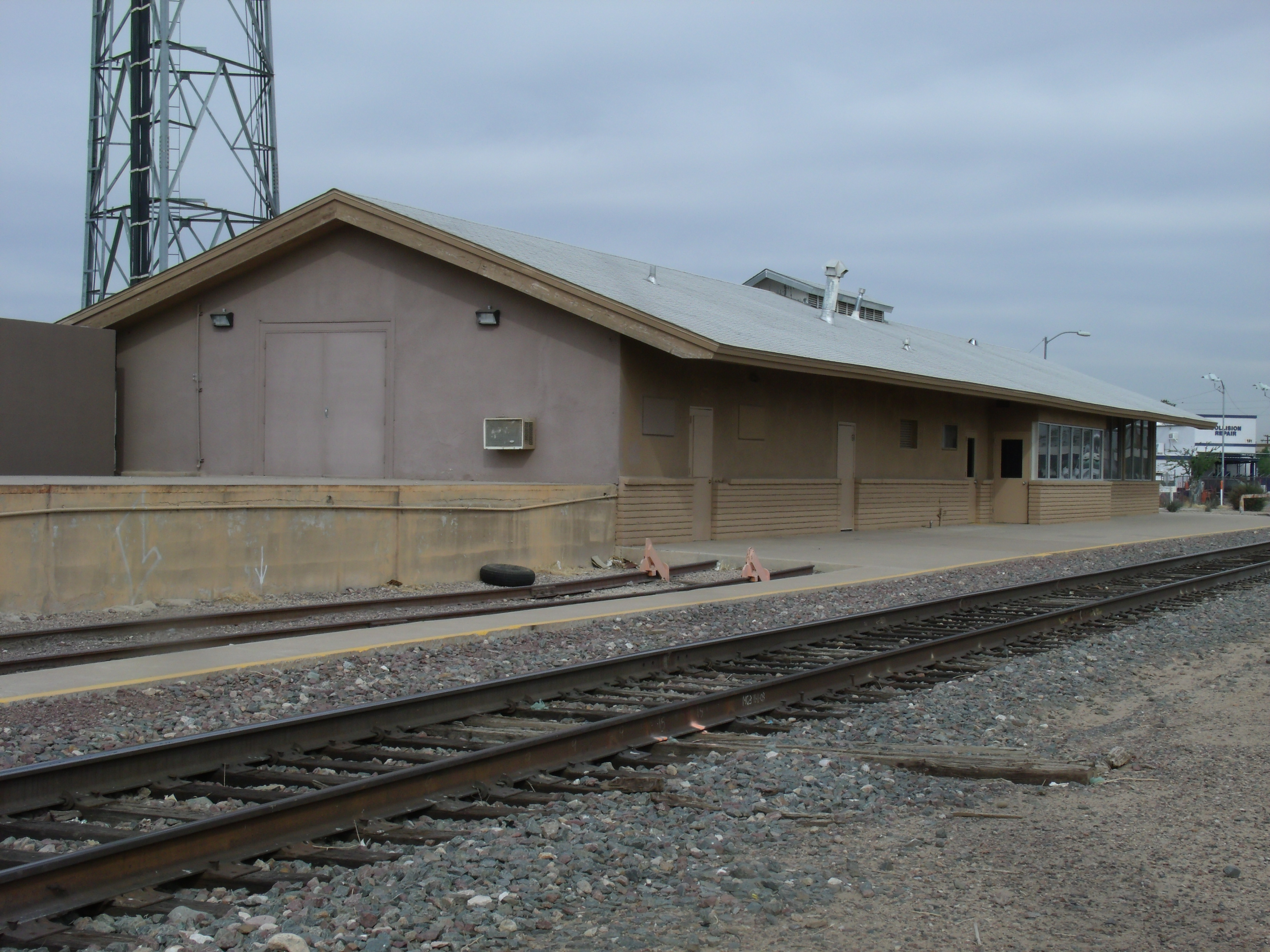
Glendale

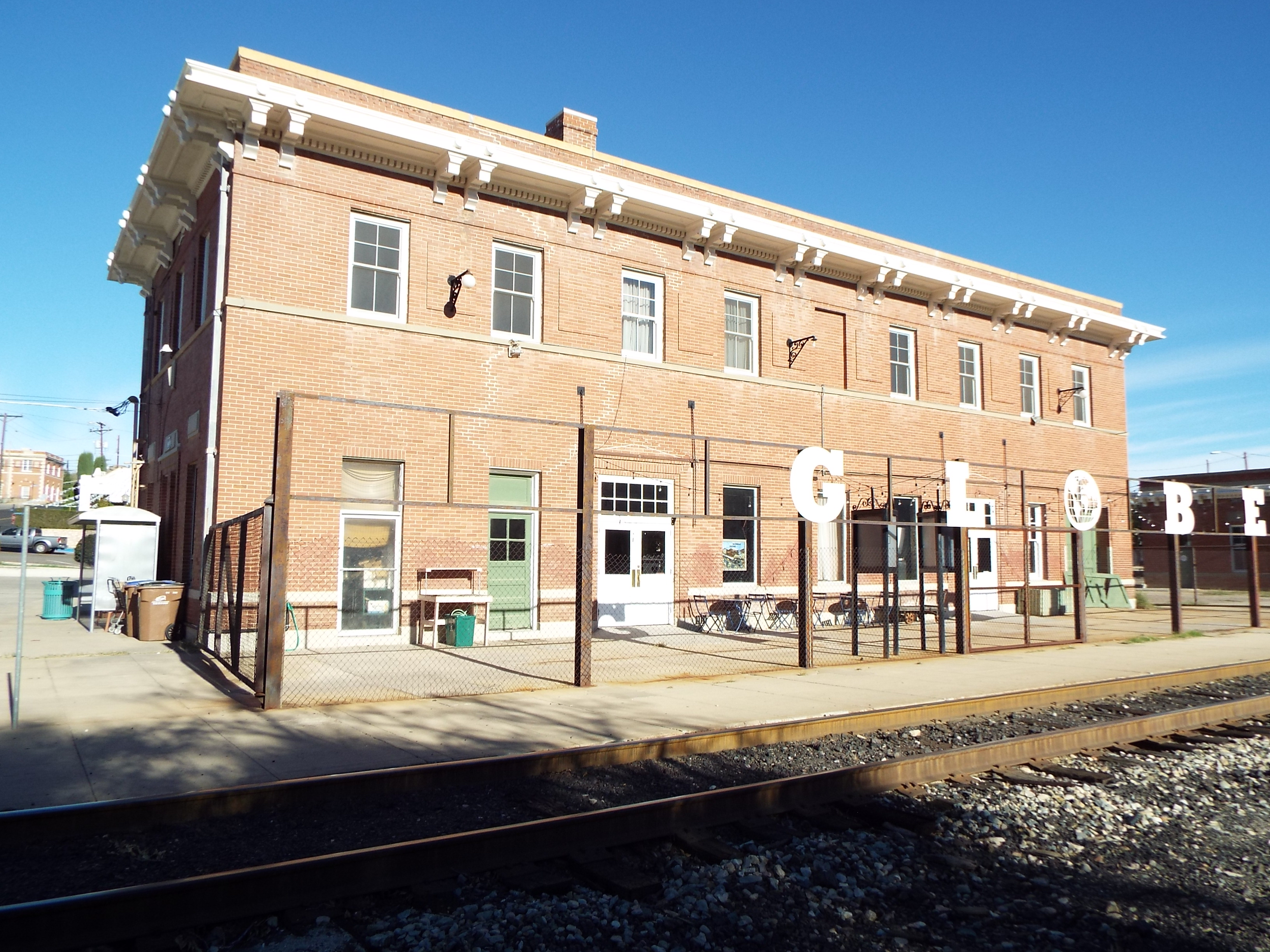
Globe

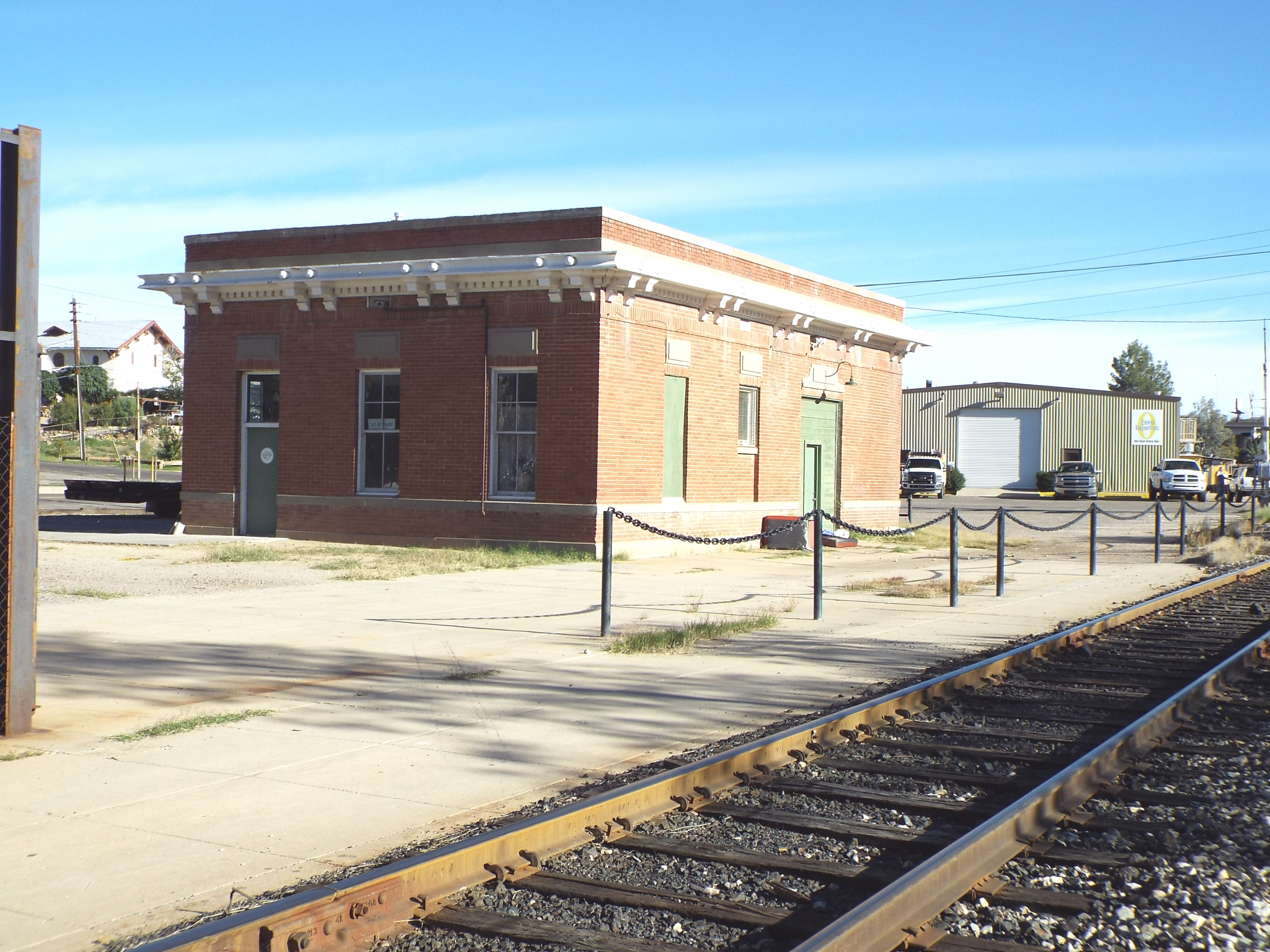
Globe

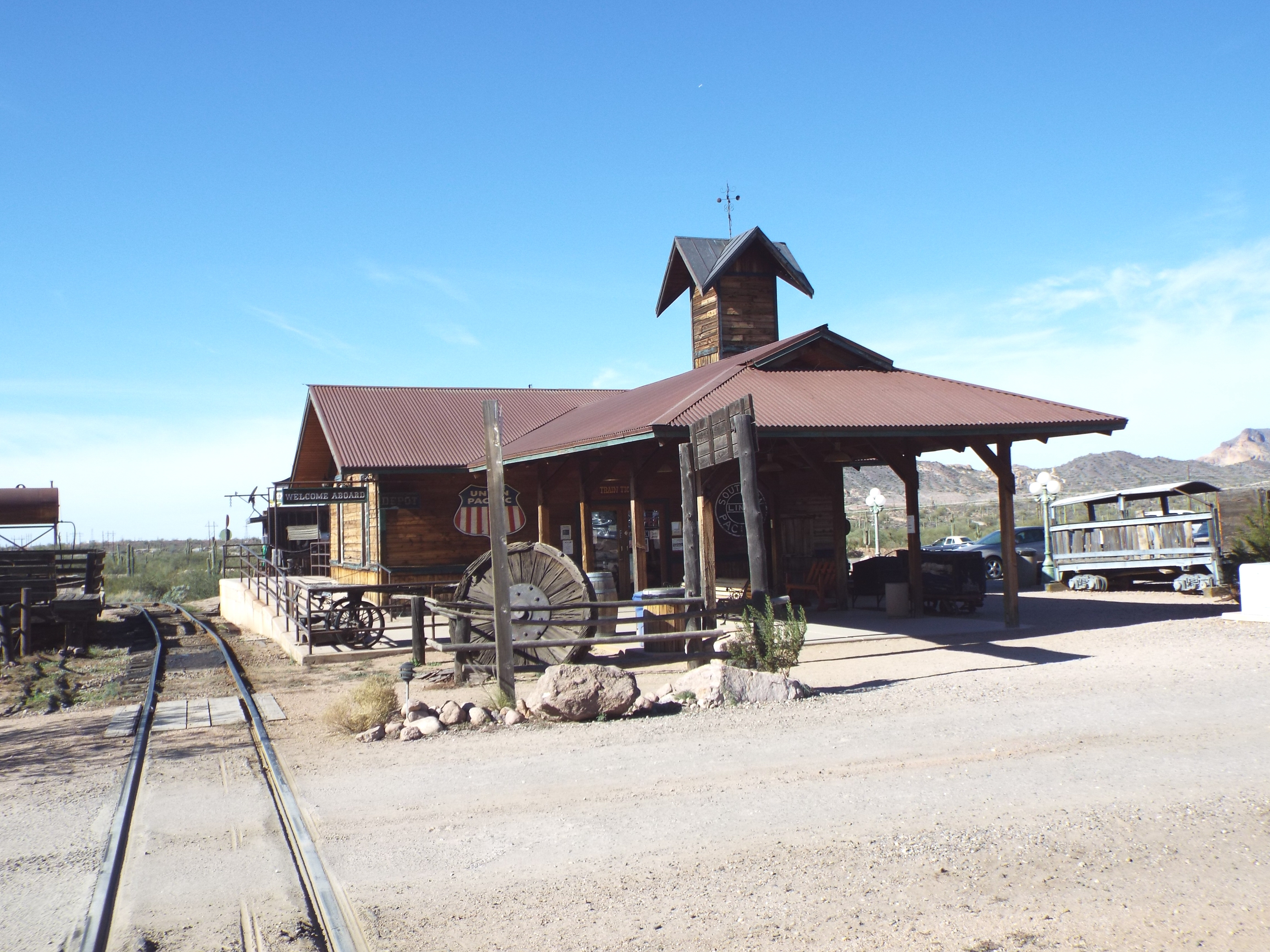
Goldfield

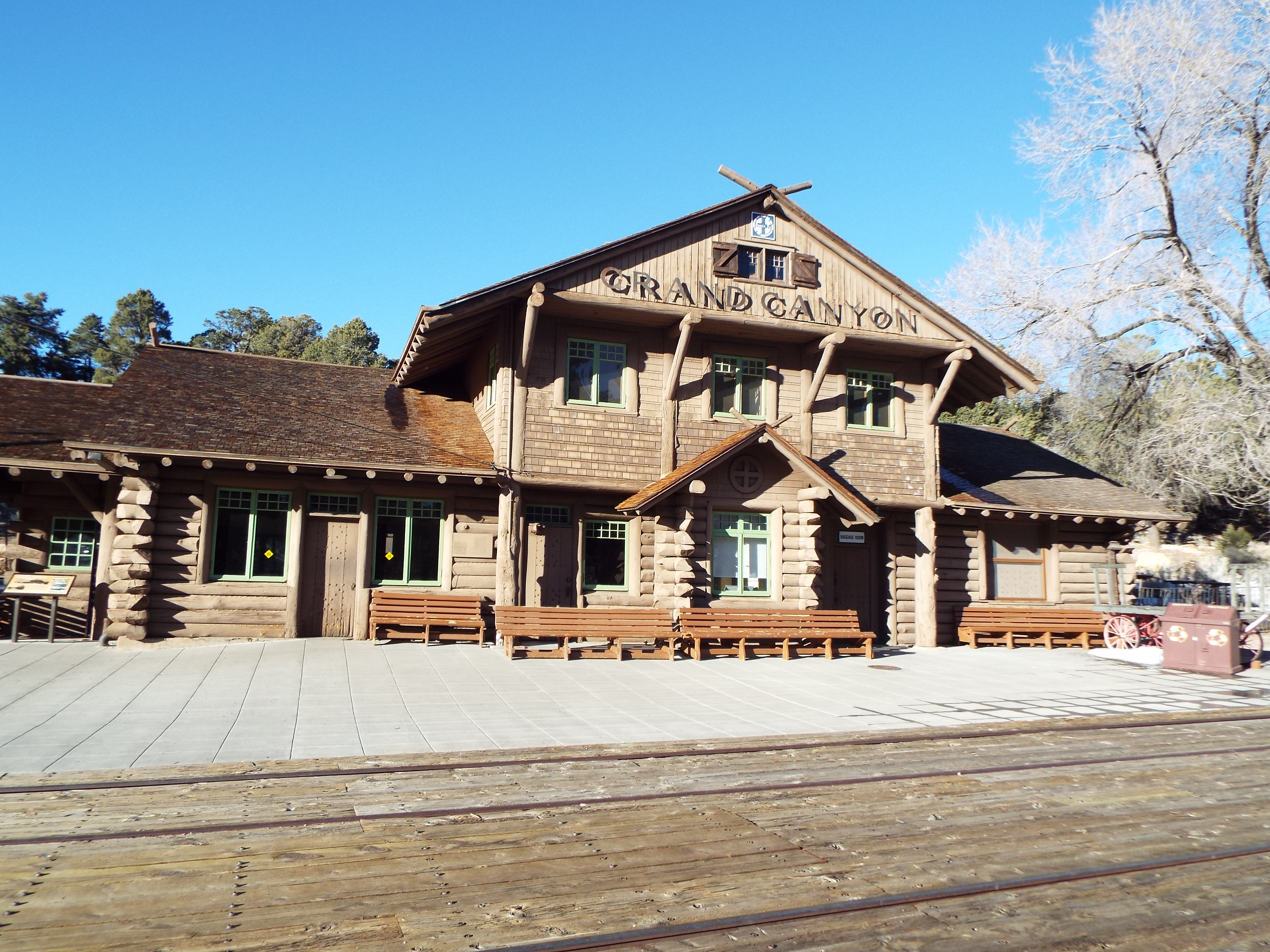
Grand Canyon Village

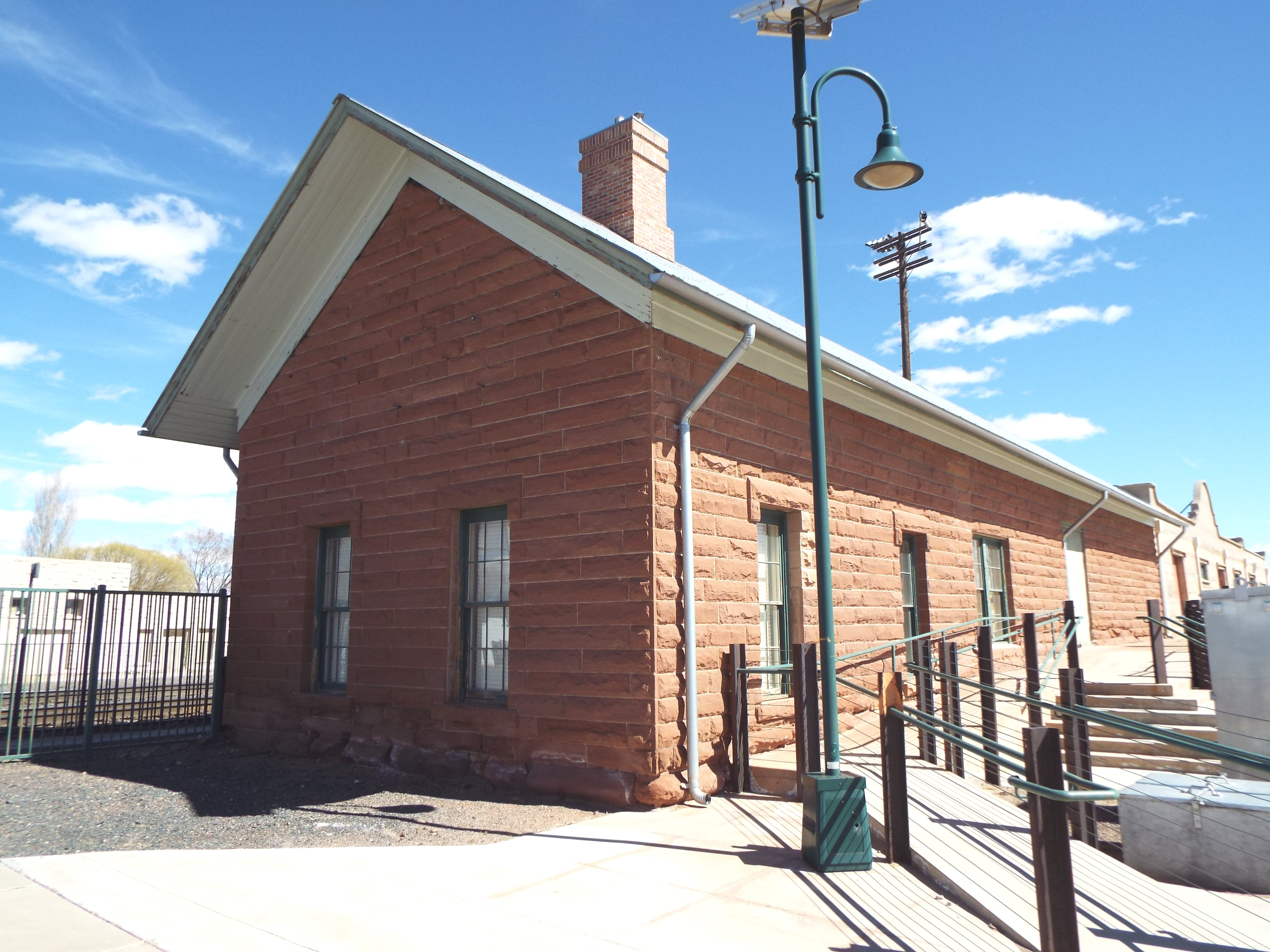
Holbrook

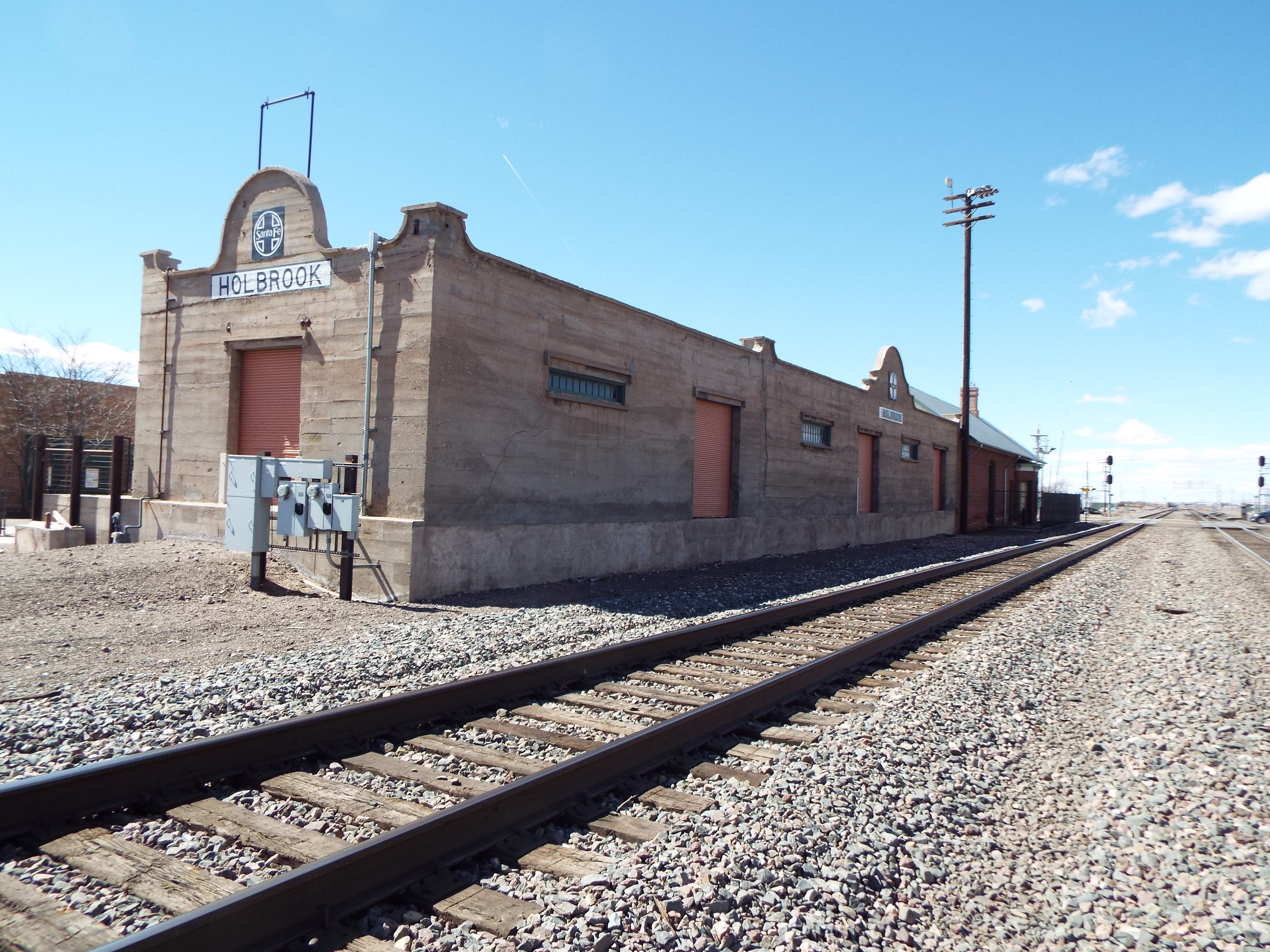
Holbrook

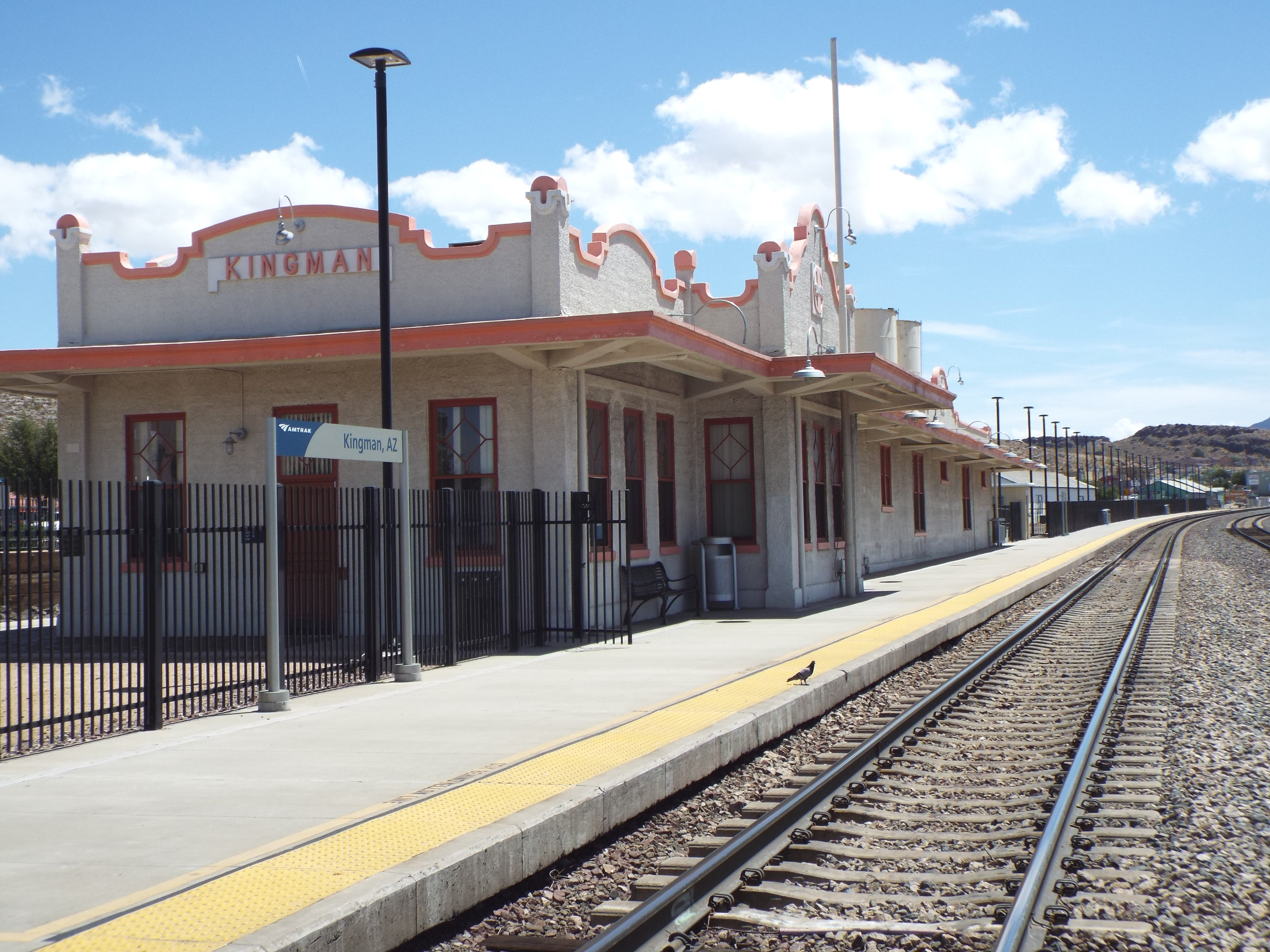
Kingman

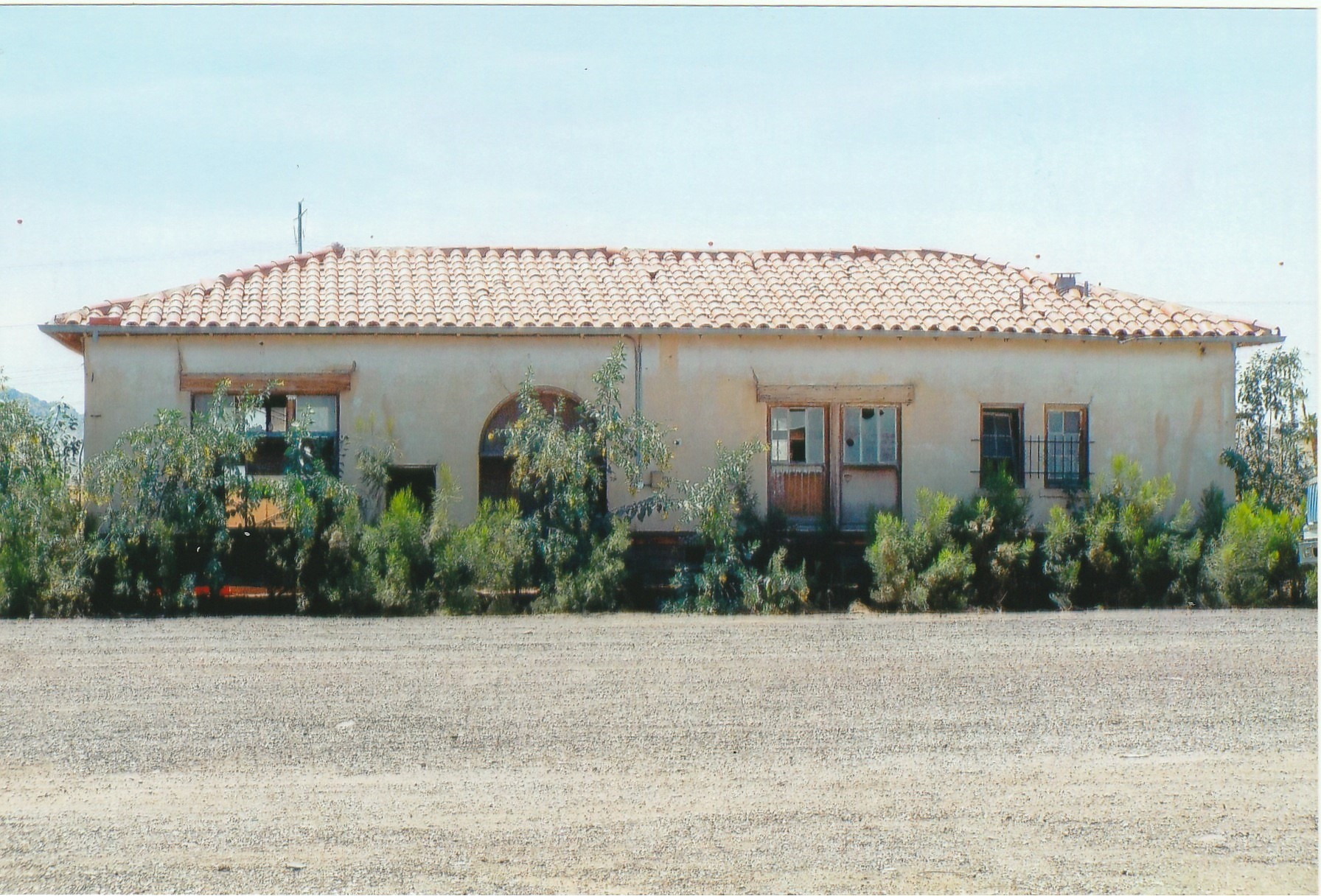
Litchfield Park

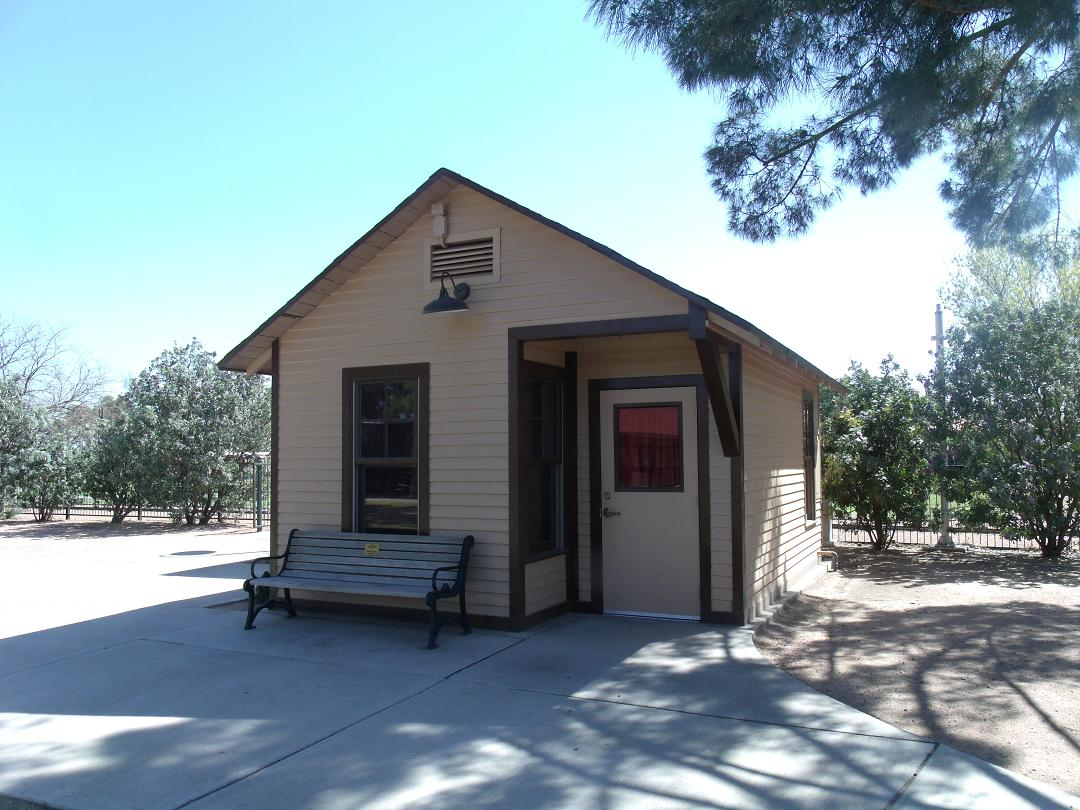
Maricopa

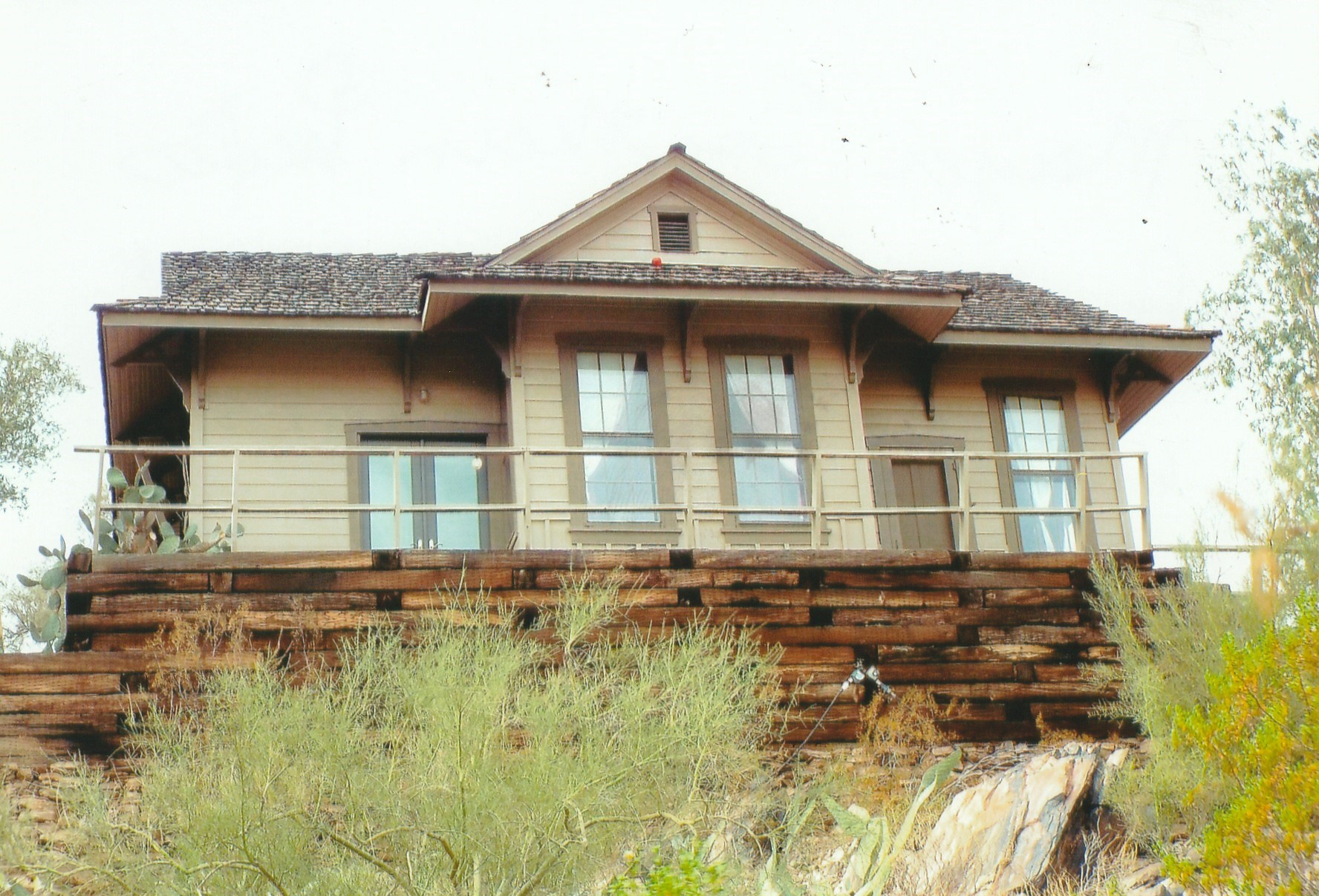
Mayer

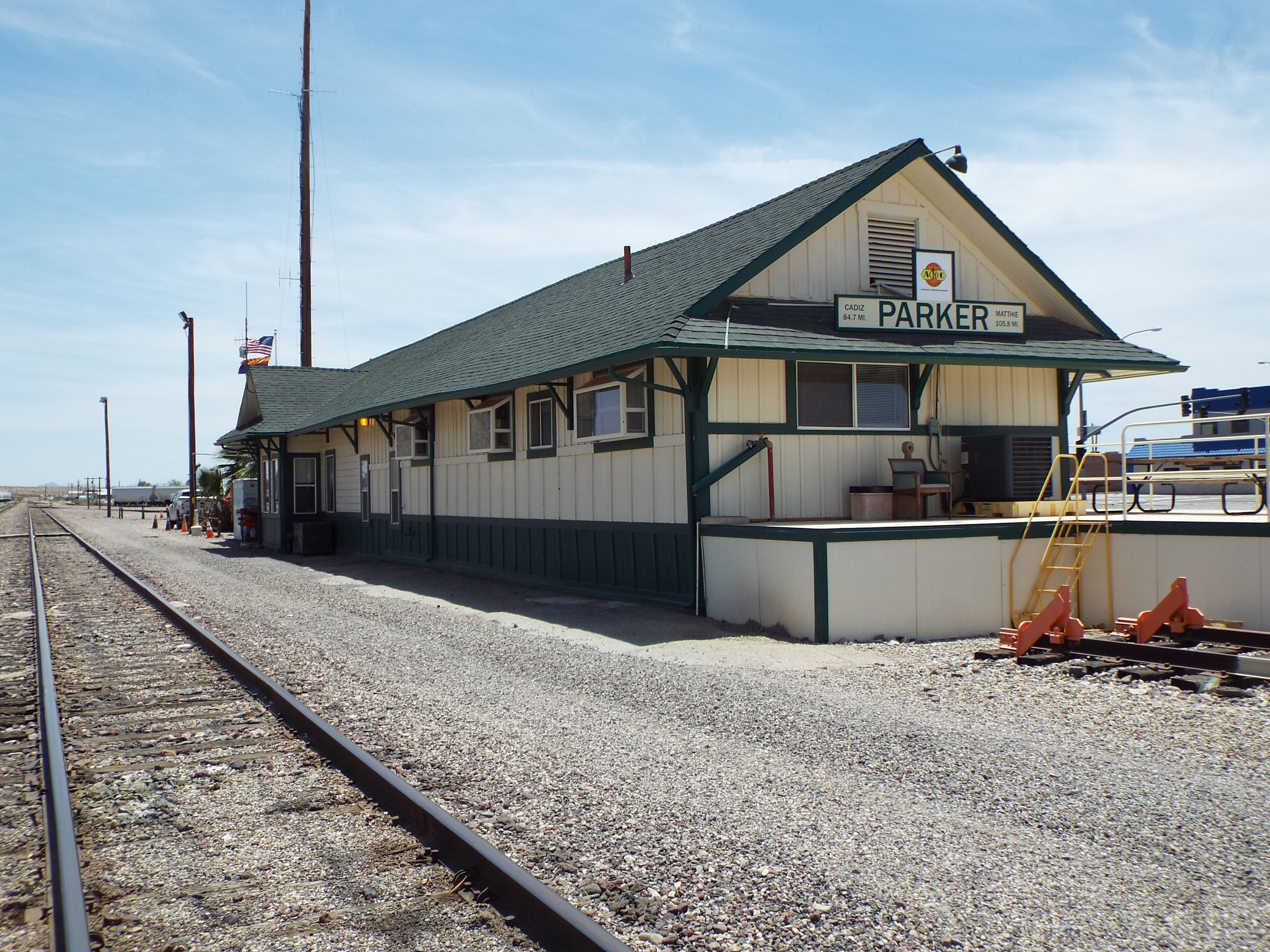
Parker

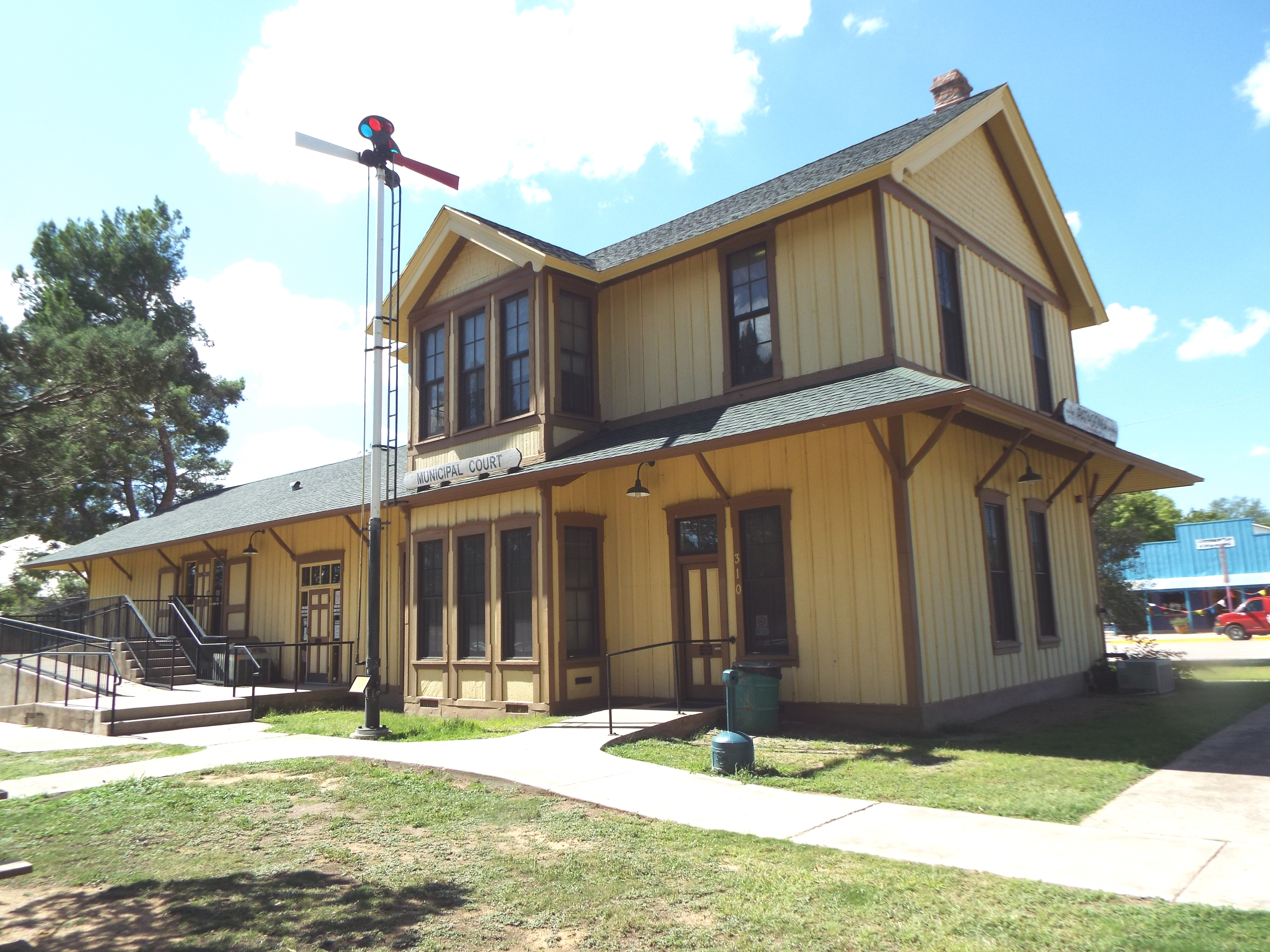
Patagonia

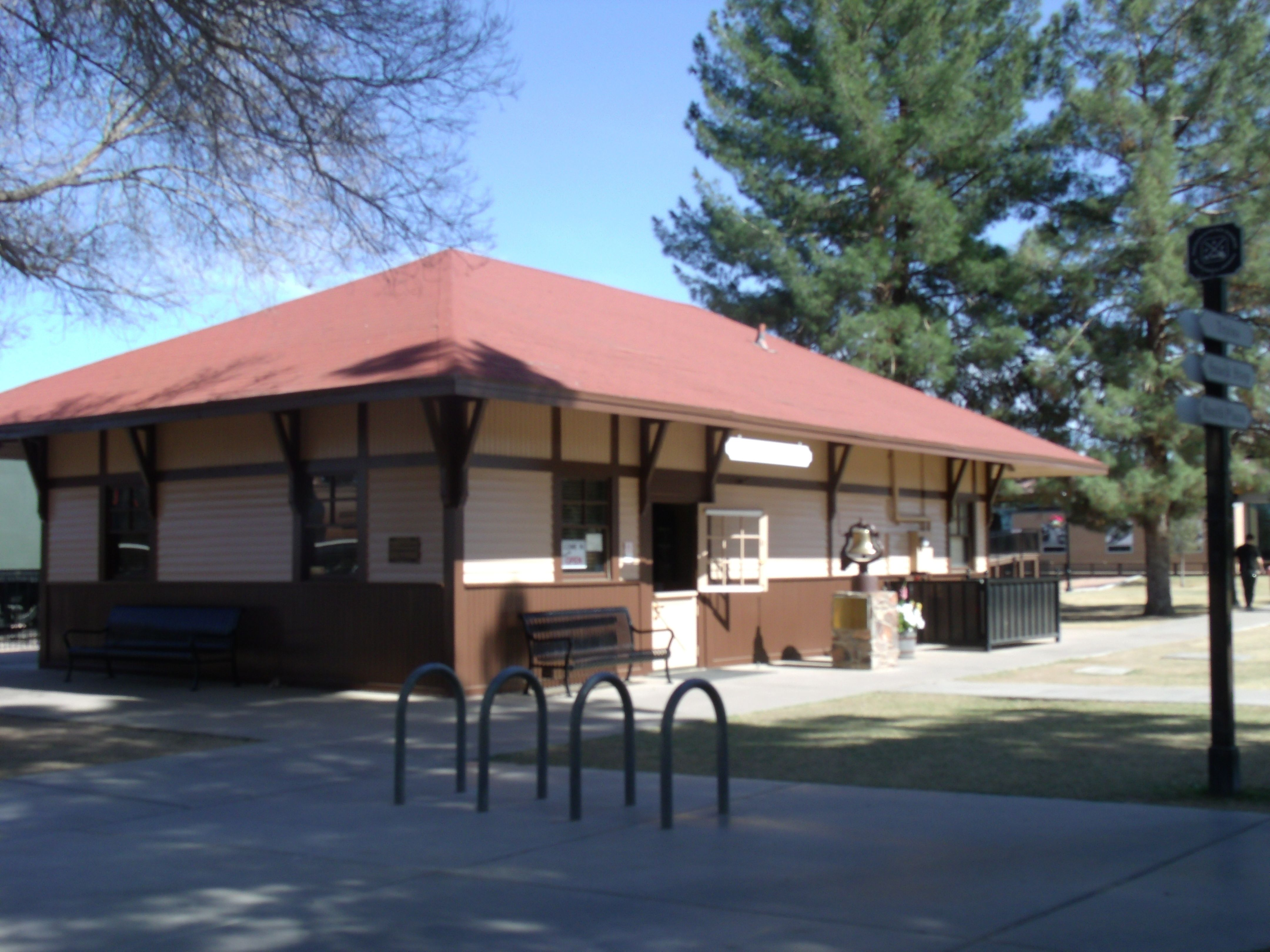
Peoria

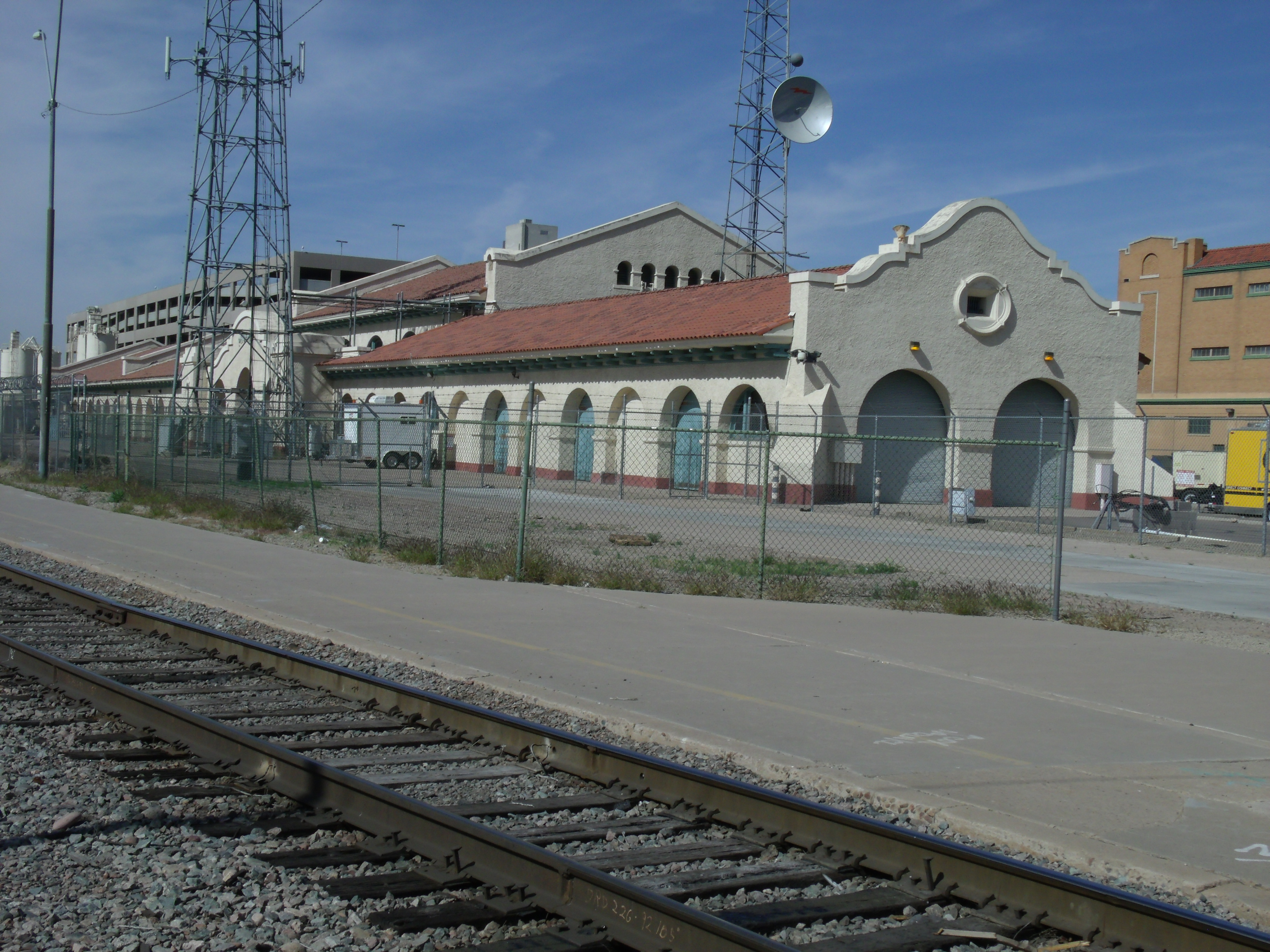
Phoenix

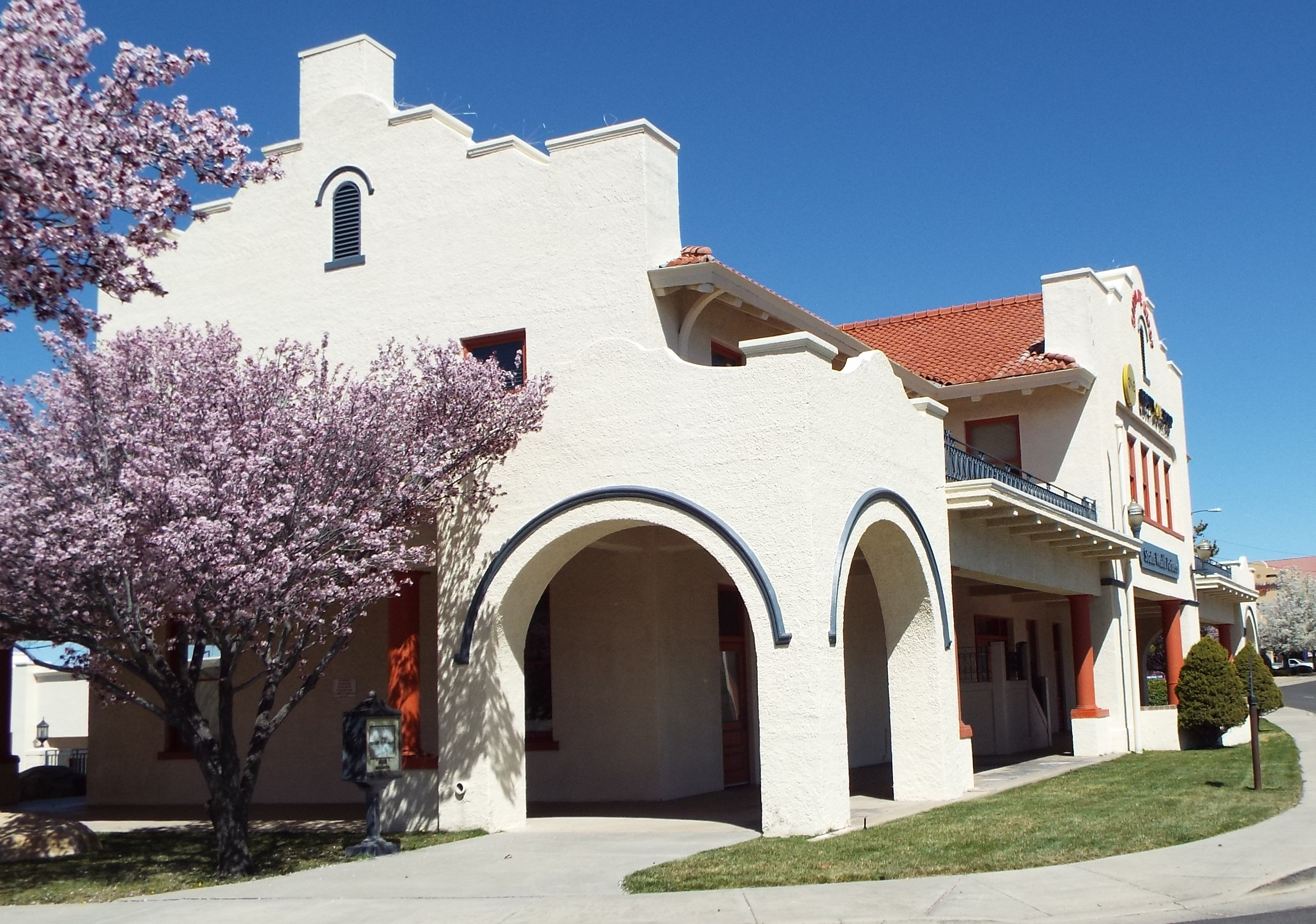
Prescott

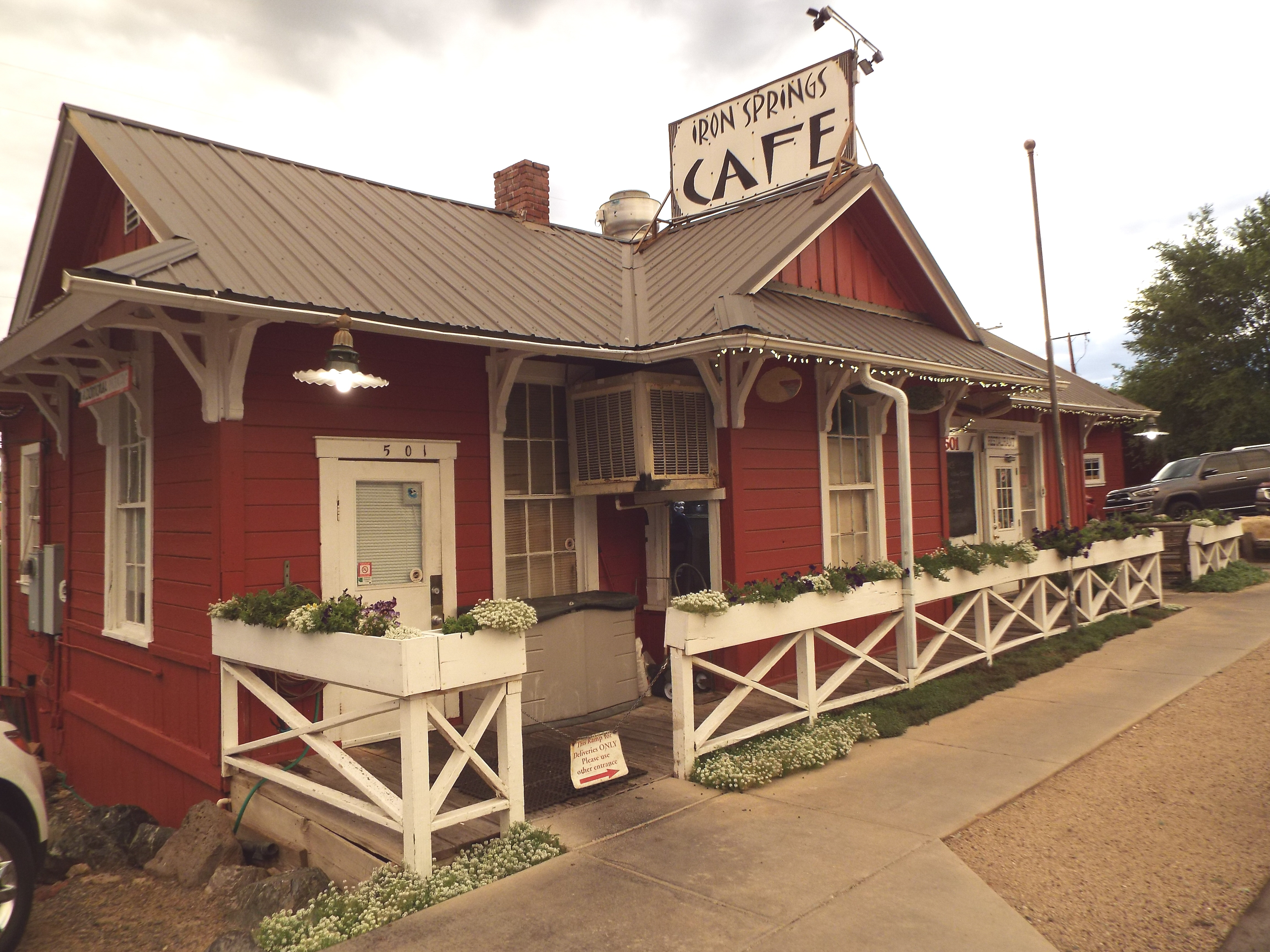
Prescott

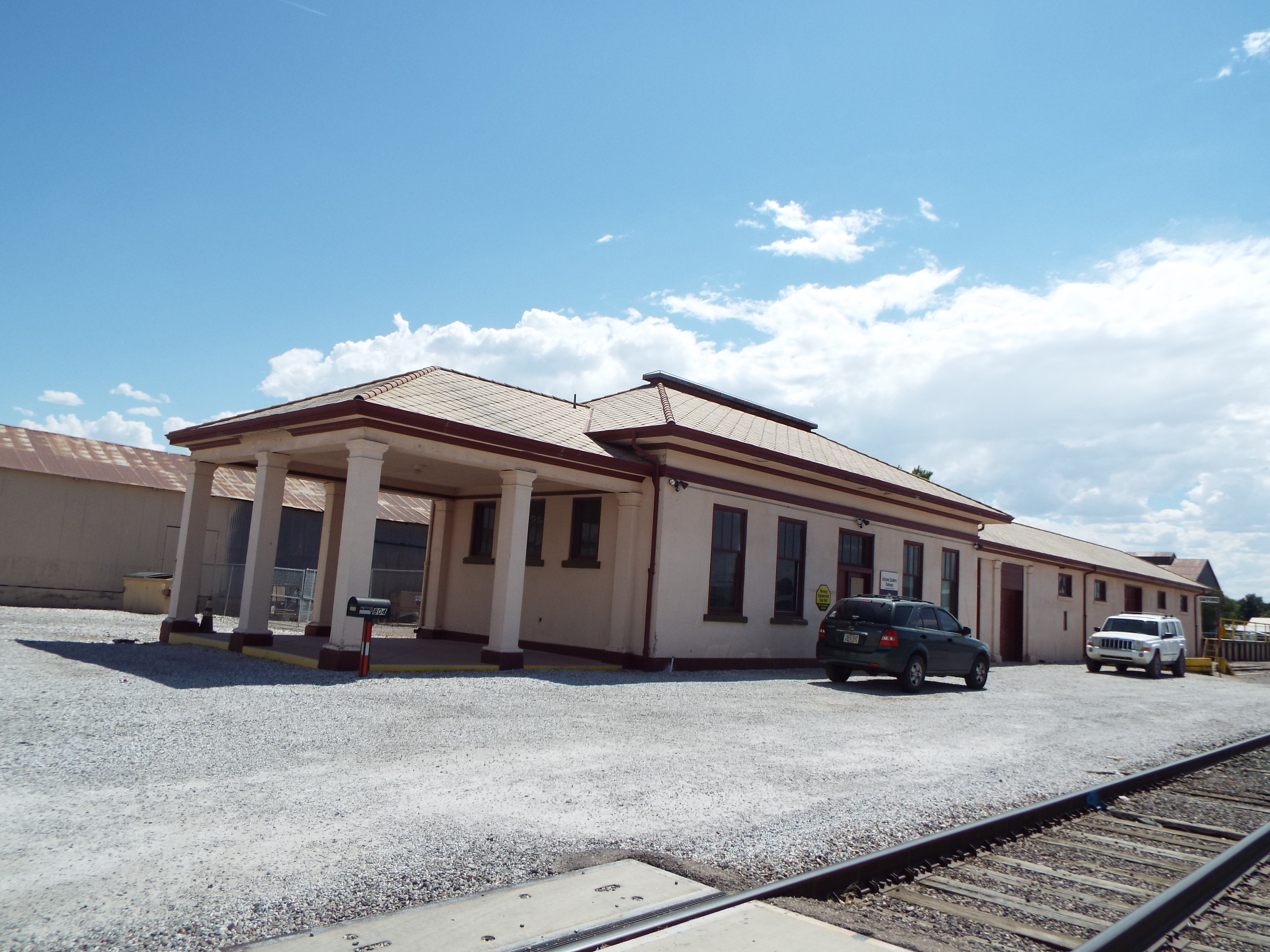
Safford

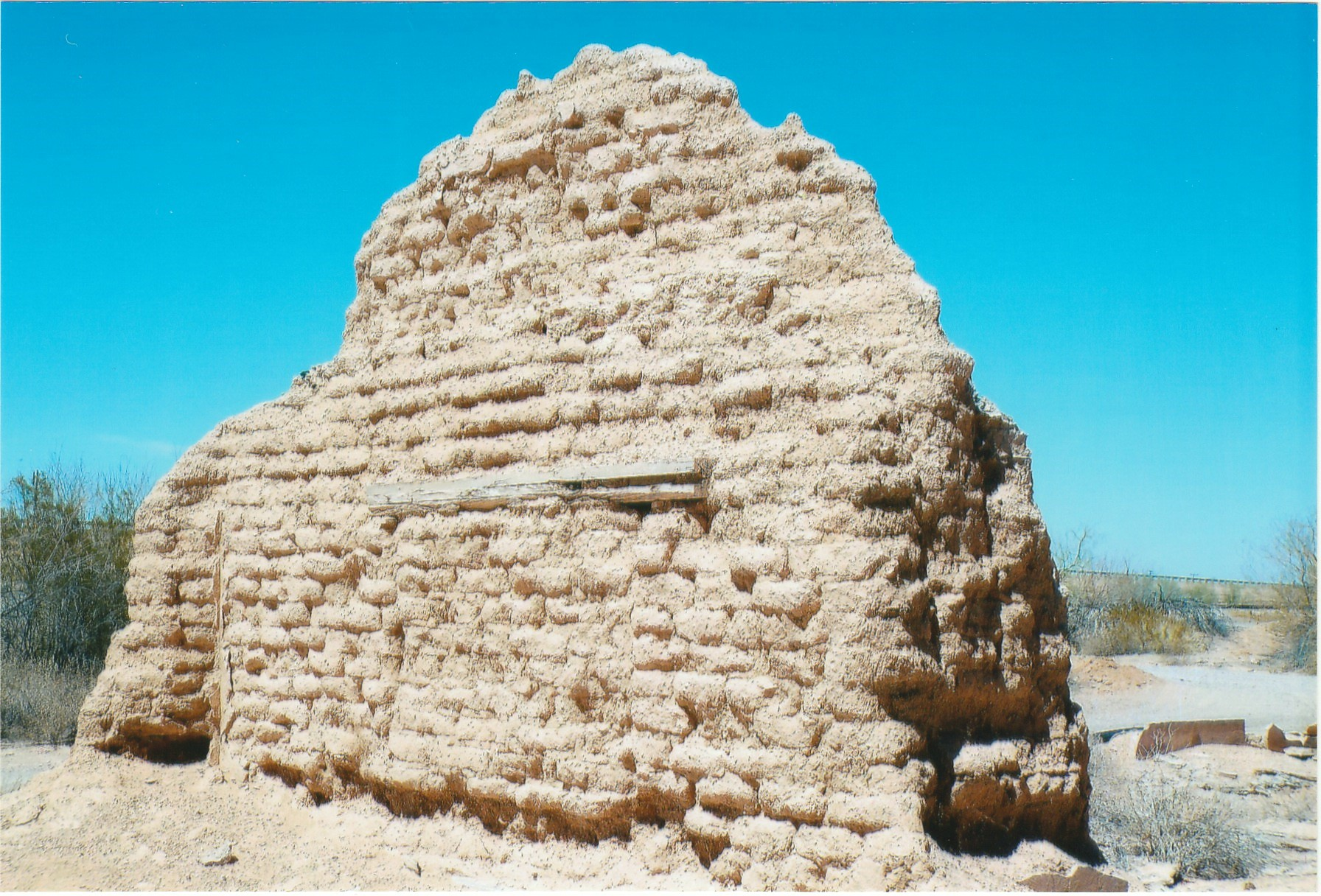
Sentinel
Depot ruins

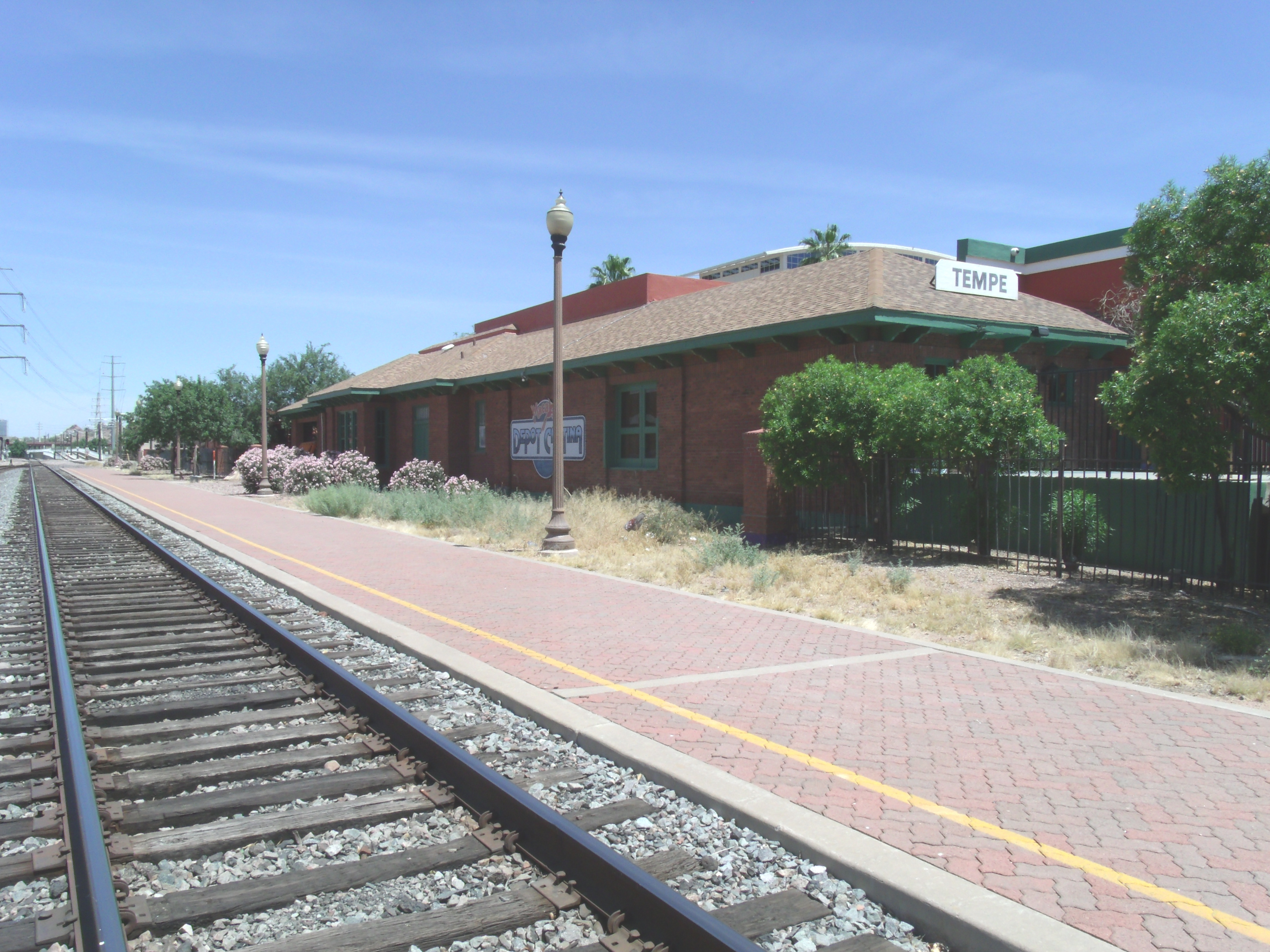
Tempe

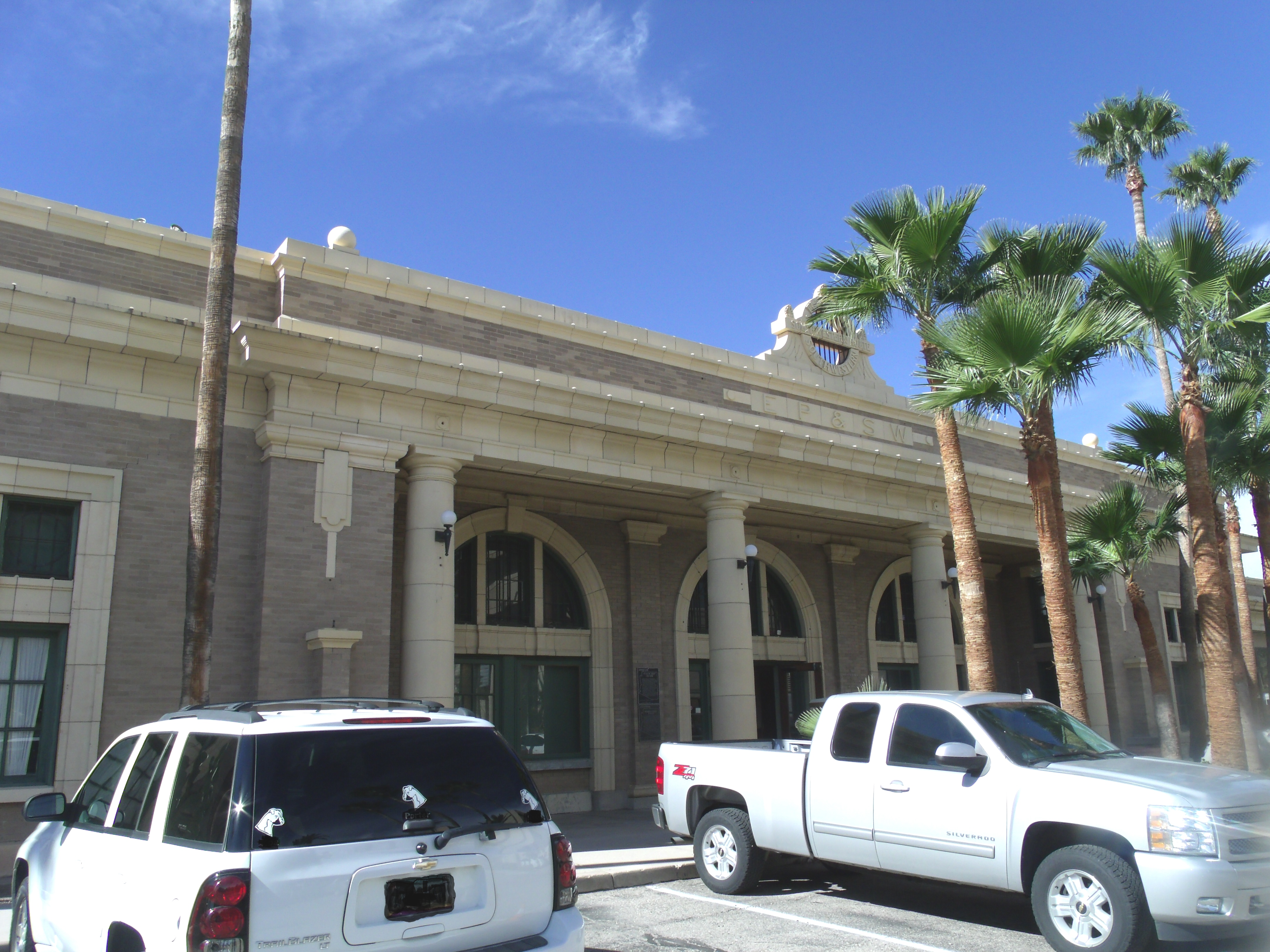
Tucson

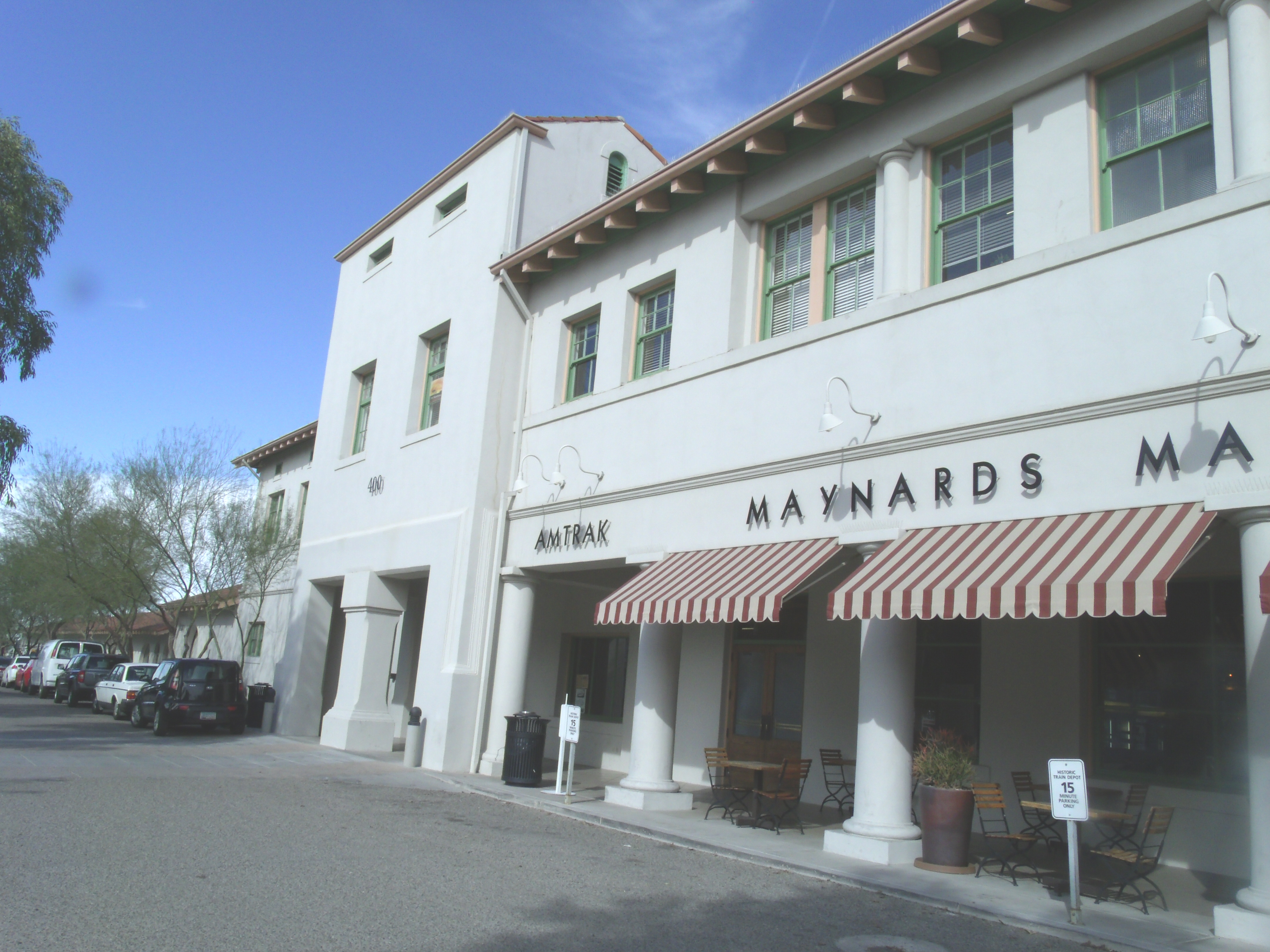
Tucson

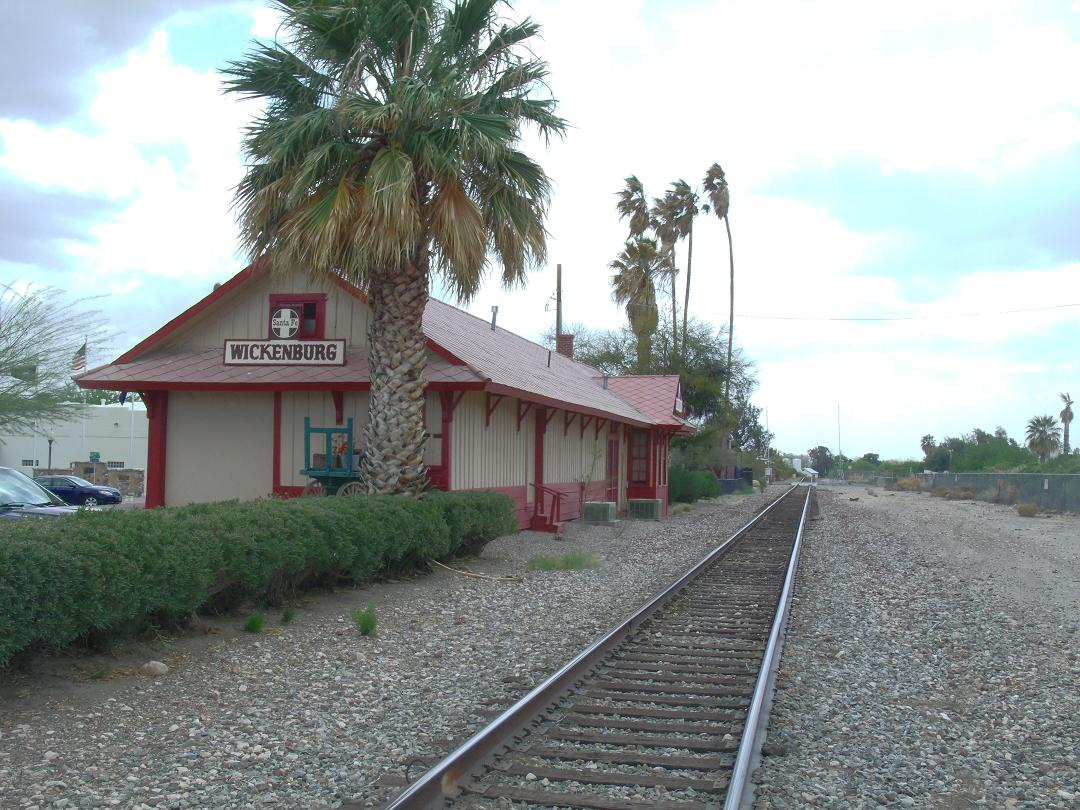
Wickenburg

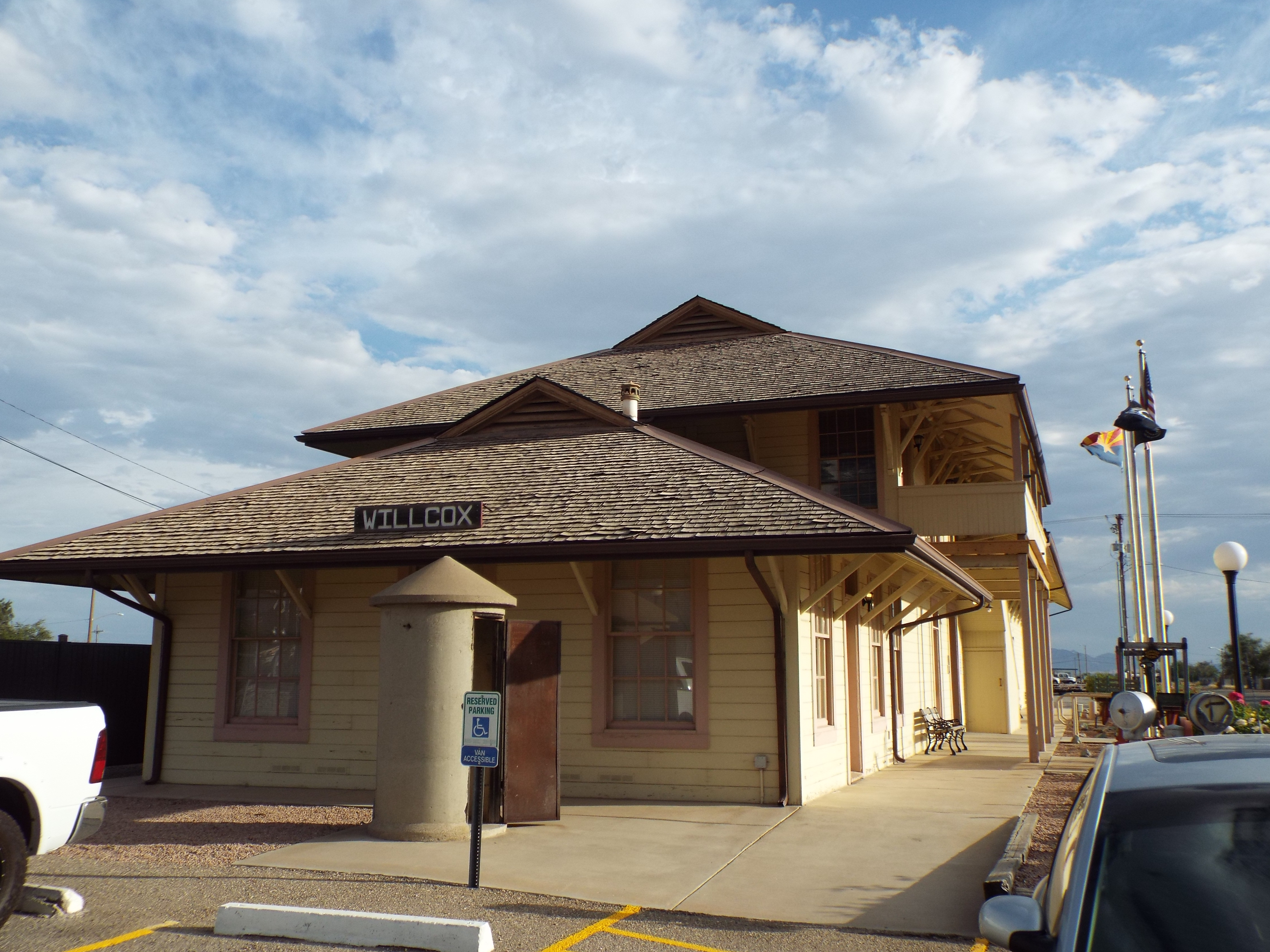
Willcox

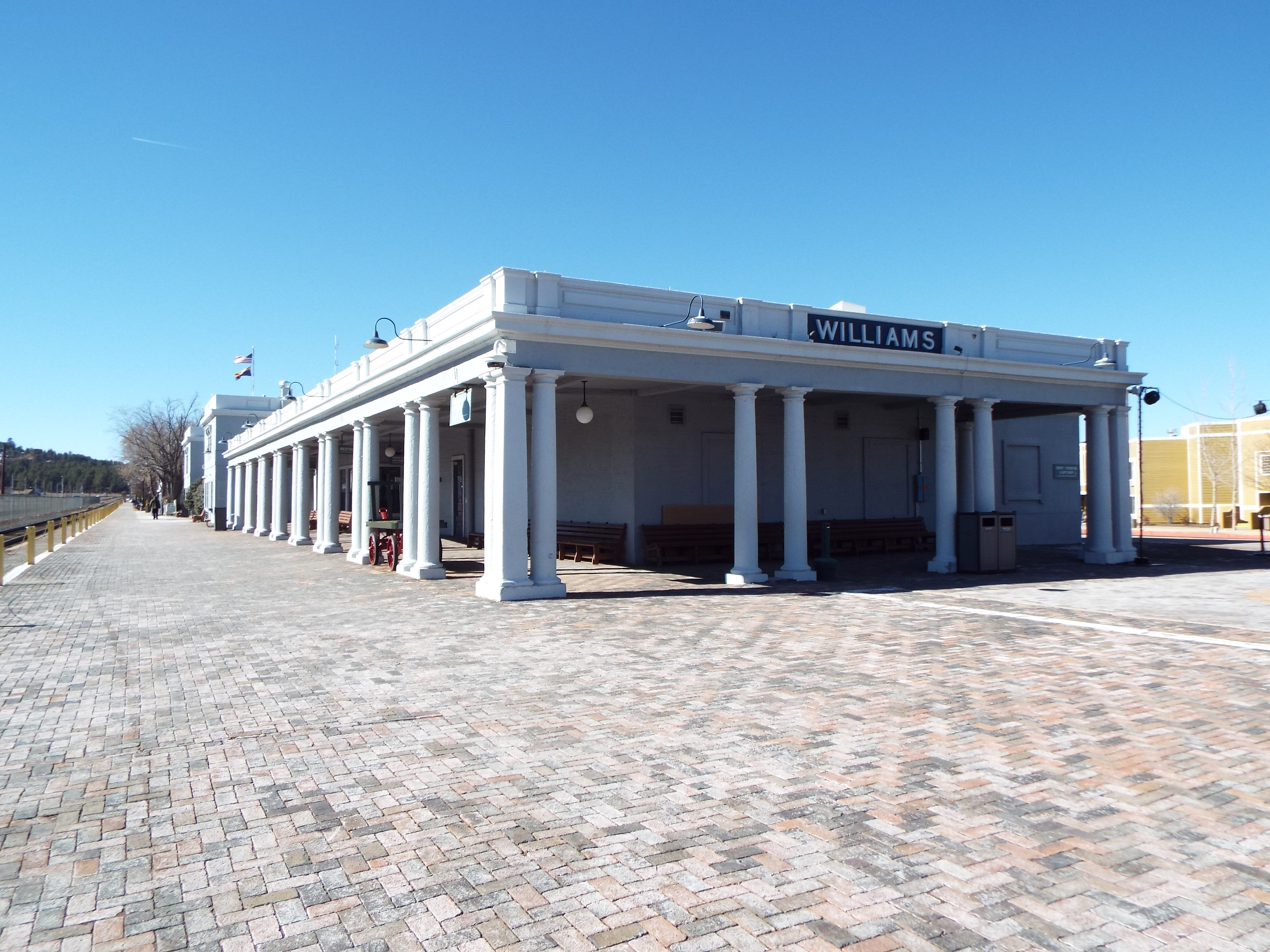
Williams

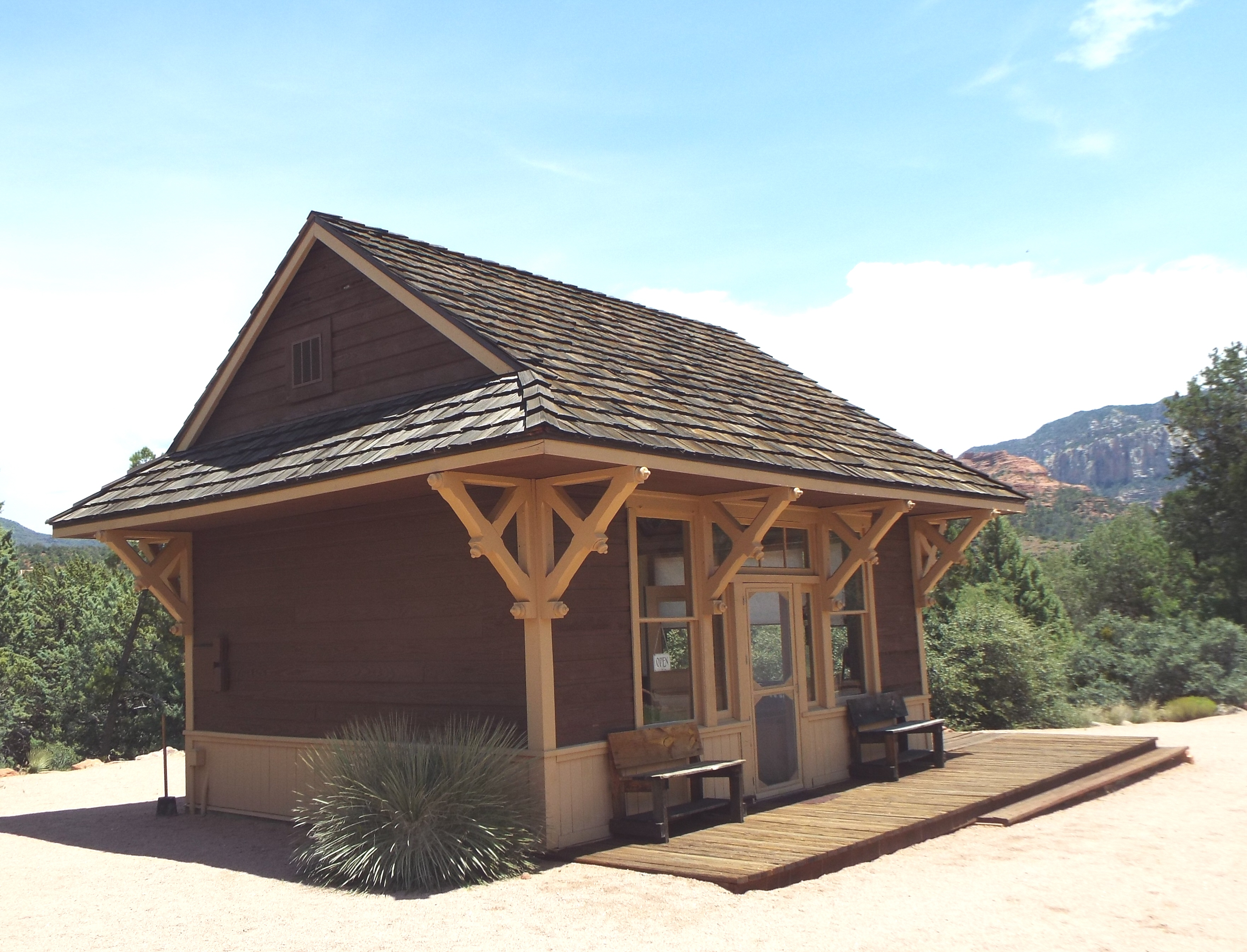
Winona

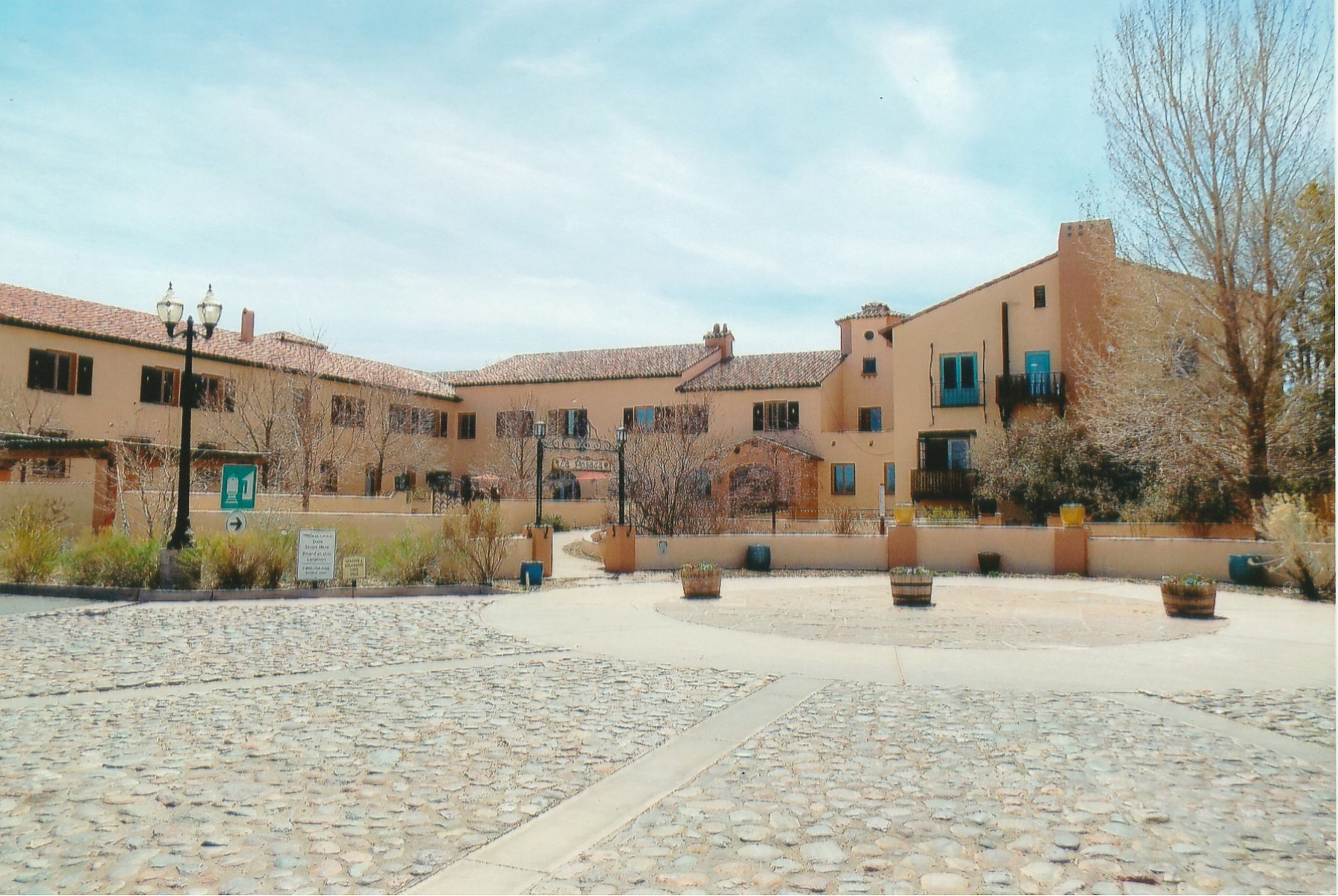
Winslow

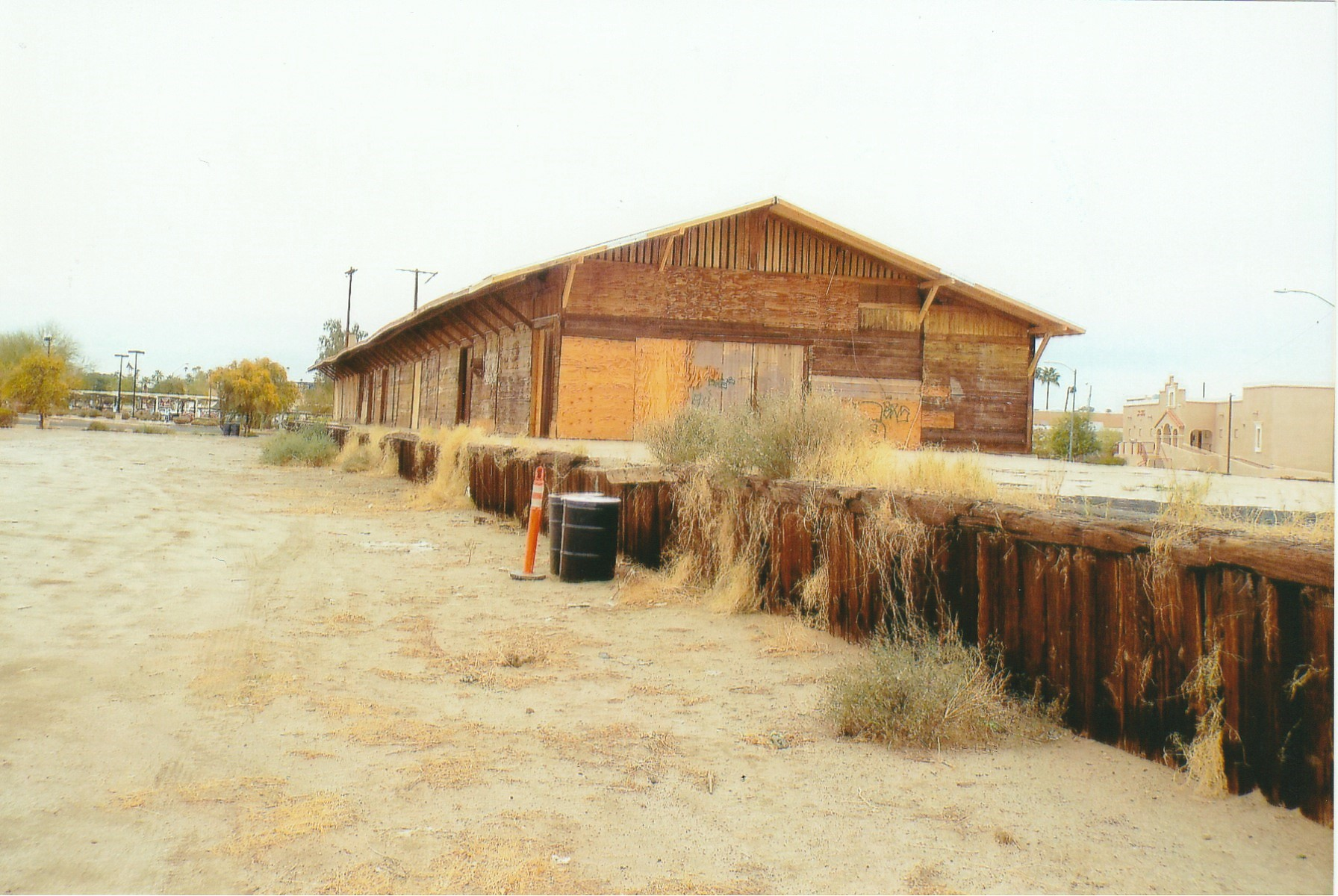
Yuma

== Sources ==
- Field observations and inspections – 1987–2007, W. Lindley (Arizona Rail Passenger Association) and M. Pearsall (Arizona DOT). Historic Official Railway Guides and timetables.
- Arizona Rail Passenger Association – สมัครเว็บแม่UFABET สมัครเว็บพนันบอลเลือกสมัครเว็บไซต์ดีที่สุด
