= List of historic properties in Cottonwood, Arizona =

- City
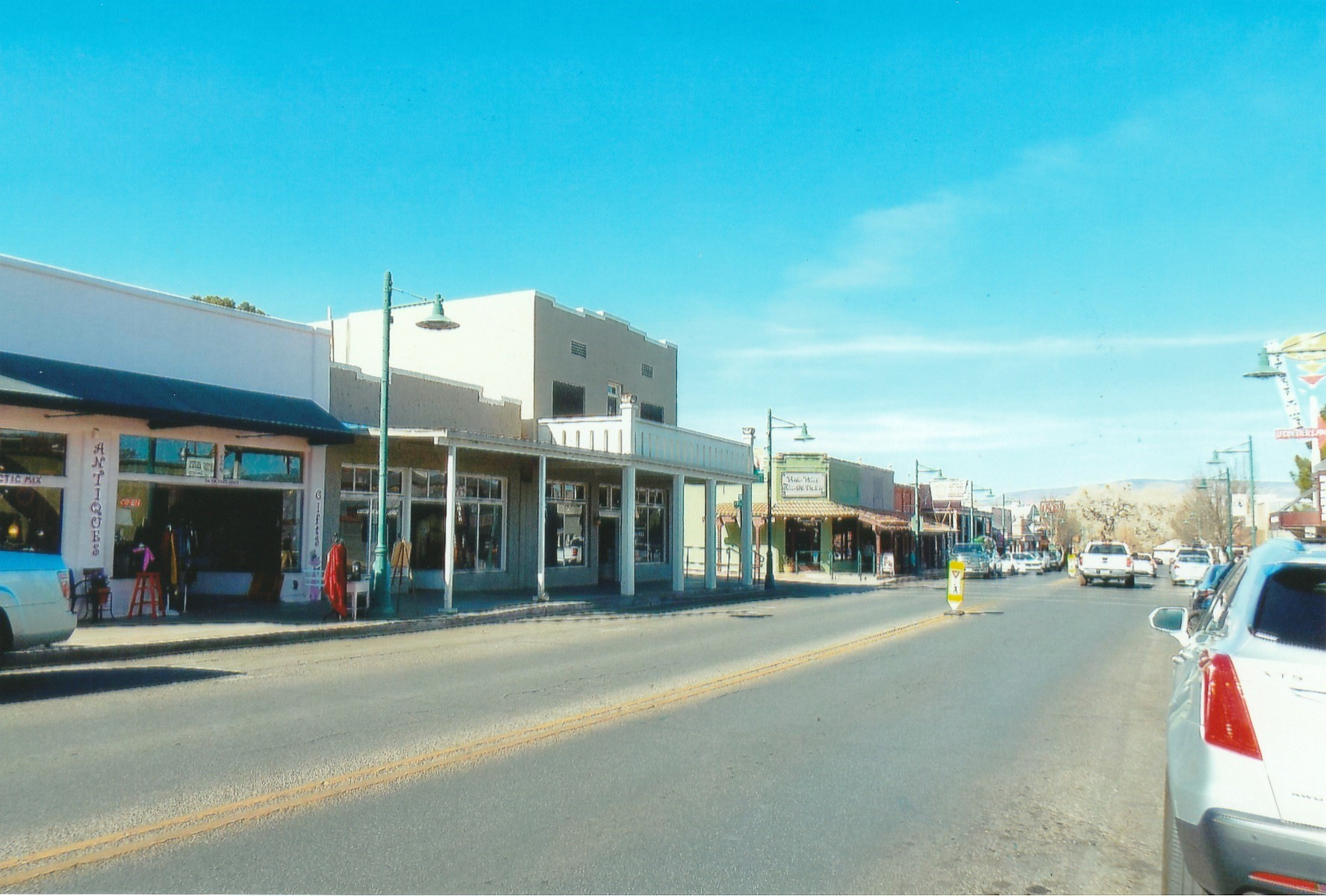
- Cottonwood Commercial Historic District

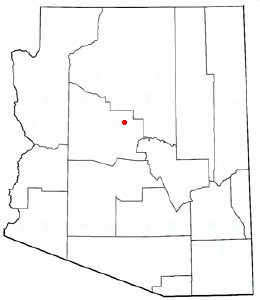
- Location of Cottonwood in Yavapai County, Arizona.

This is a list, which includes a photographic gallery, of some of the remaining structures and monuments of historic significance in Cottonwood, a city in Yavapai County, Arizona. Cottonwood is located between the cities of Prescott, and Sedona.

== Brief history ==
During the Pre-Columbian era, the area was occupied by Sinagua people who built their dwellings in the cliffs of the Verde Valley Mountains between the years of 1100 and 1425. In 1583, Captain Antonio de Espejo and the Spanish conquistadors took possession of the Verde Valley.

In the 1860s settlers began to migrate into the Verde Valley to work in the mining industry. The United States Army established a minor post overlooking the farms which the settlers established in West Clear Water. A post called Camp Lincoln, which later was renamed Camp Verde, was established.

By 1879, a number of families from the mid-western area of the United States arrived in the area. Among them was Charles D. Willard and his family. He named the area Cottonwood because there was a circle of sixteen large cottonwoods growing about one-quarter of a mile away from the Verde River. Willard, who founded the town, is considered to be the "Father of Cottonwood." The area became a farming settlement.

Cottonwood also has a commercial district which was listed in the National Register of Historic Places in 2000 (ref.#00000497) as the Cottonwood Commercial Historic District. Included are the buildings and residences from 712 to 1124 N. Main Street. Cottonwood, however, does not have the authority to deny a demolition permit. Therefore, the owner of a property, listed either in the National Register of Historic Places or considered historical by the Verde Historical Society, may demolish the historical property in question if he or she so desires. Such was the fate of the 1875 Strahan House, which was added to the National Register of Historic Places in 1986, reference #86002157. The historic house, which was located at 725 E. Main St., was demolished in 2007 and has since been removed from the NRHP.

According to Jim McPherson, Arizona Preservation Foundation Board President:

"It is crucial that residents, private interests, and government officials act now to save these elements of our cultural heritage before it is too late.”

In charge of the preservation of the historical artifacts and structures of Cottonwood is the Verde Historical Society. The society headquarters is located in 1 N. Willard Road in the old Clemenceau High School. The Clemenceau High School, which is listed in the National Register of Historic Places, also houses the Clemenceau Heritage Museum.

== Historic structures ==
The following is a brief description with the images of the historic properties, some of which are listed in the National Register of Historic Places.

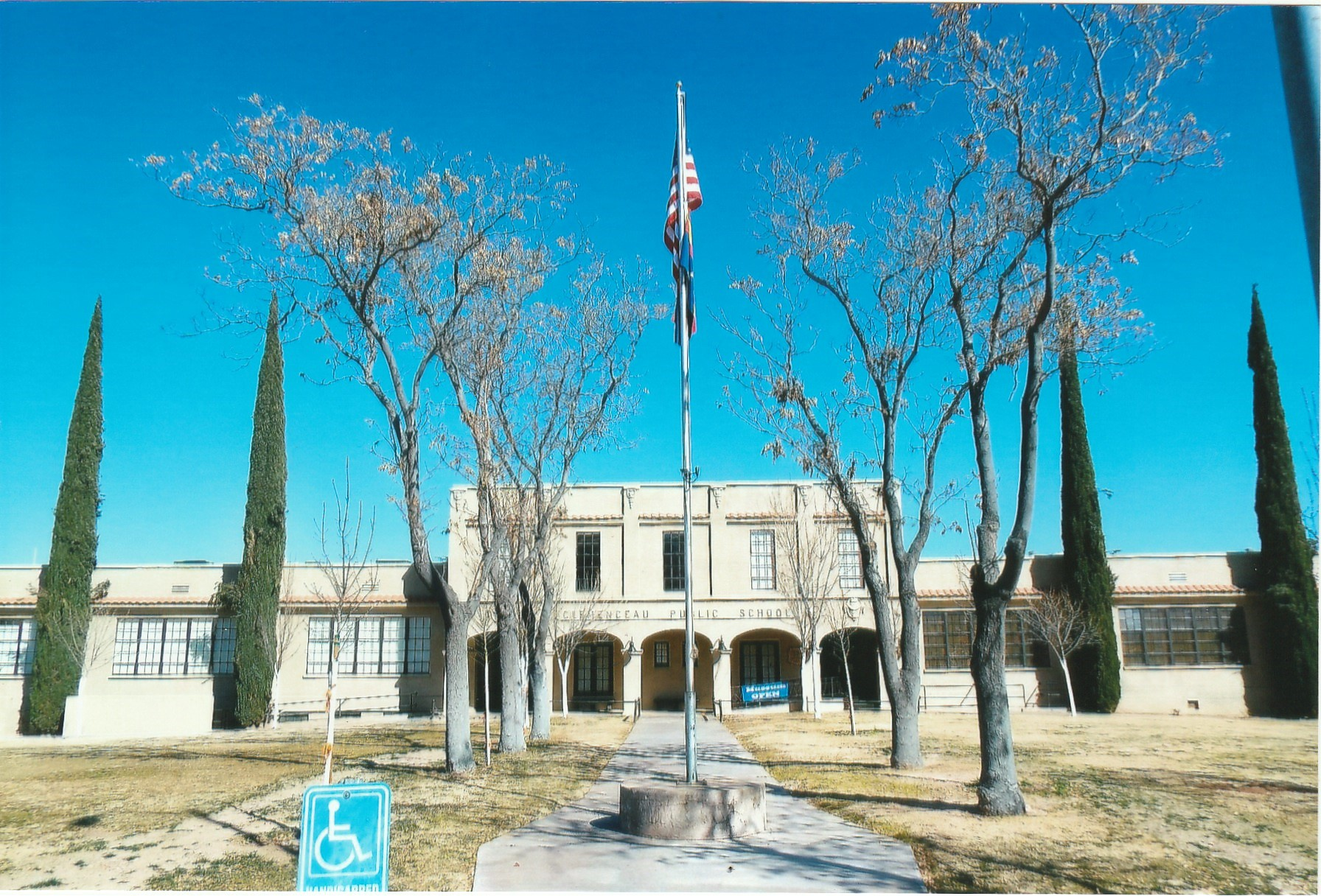
Clemenceau Public School

- The Smelter Machine Shop – built in 1900 and located at 1605 6th Street. It was listed in the National Register of Historic Places in 1986, reference #86002154.
- The Superintendent Residence – built in 1925 and located at 315 S. Willard Street. It was listed in the National Register of Historic Places in 1986, reference #86002159.
- The Master Mechanic's House – built in 1900 and located at 333 S. Willard Street. It was listed in the National Register of Historic Places in 1986, reference #86002152.
- Three remaining office structures in the UVX Smelter Operations Complex – each building was related to the management of the Cottonwood facility. They were built in 1920 and are located at 361 S. Willard Street. Listed in the National Register of Historic Places on September 19, 1986, reference: #86002164.
- Clemenceau Public School – built in 1923 and located at 1 N. Willard Street. It was listed in the National Register of Historic Places in 1986, reference #86002149.
- The Building at 826 North Main Street – built in 1925 and located at 826 S. N. Main Street. It was listed in the National Register of Historic Places in 1986, reference #86002147.
- The Mary Willard House – built in 1890 and located at 1127 N. Main Street. It is the oldest house in Cottonwood. It was listed in the National Register of Historic Places in 1986, reference #86002166. According to the National Register of Historic Places, Mary Willard bought a large tract of land and homesteaded another parcel. With the help of her sons, she began building a large, two-story Queen Anne style house on her homestead in 1885. Clay was dug near the site and kilns were constructed. This was the first brick known to have been manufactured in the Upper Verde Valley.
- Edens House – built in 1928 and located at 1015 N. Cactus Street. W. Frank Edens was the contractor for the building on Main Street used for the Cottonwood Café and other businesses. Listed in the National Register of Historic Places on September 19, 1986, reference: #86002150.

=== Historic properties and structures pictured ===
Historic individual structures in Cottonwood
listed in the National Register of Historic Places.

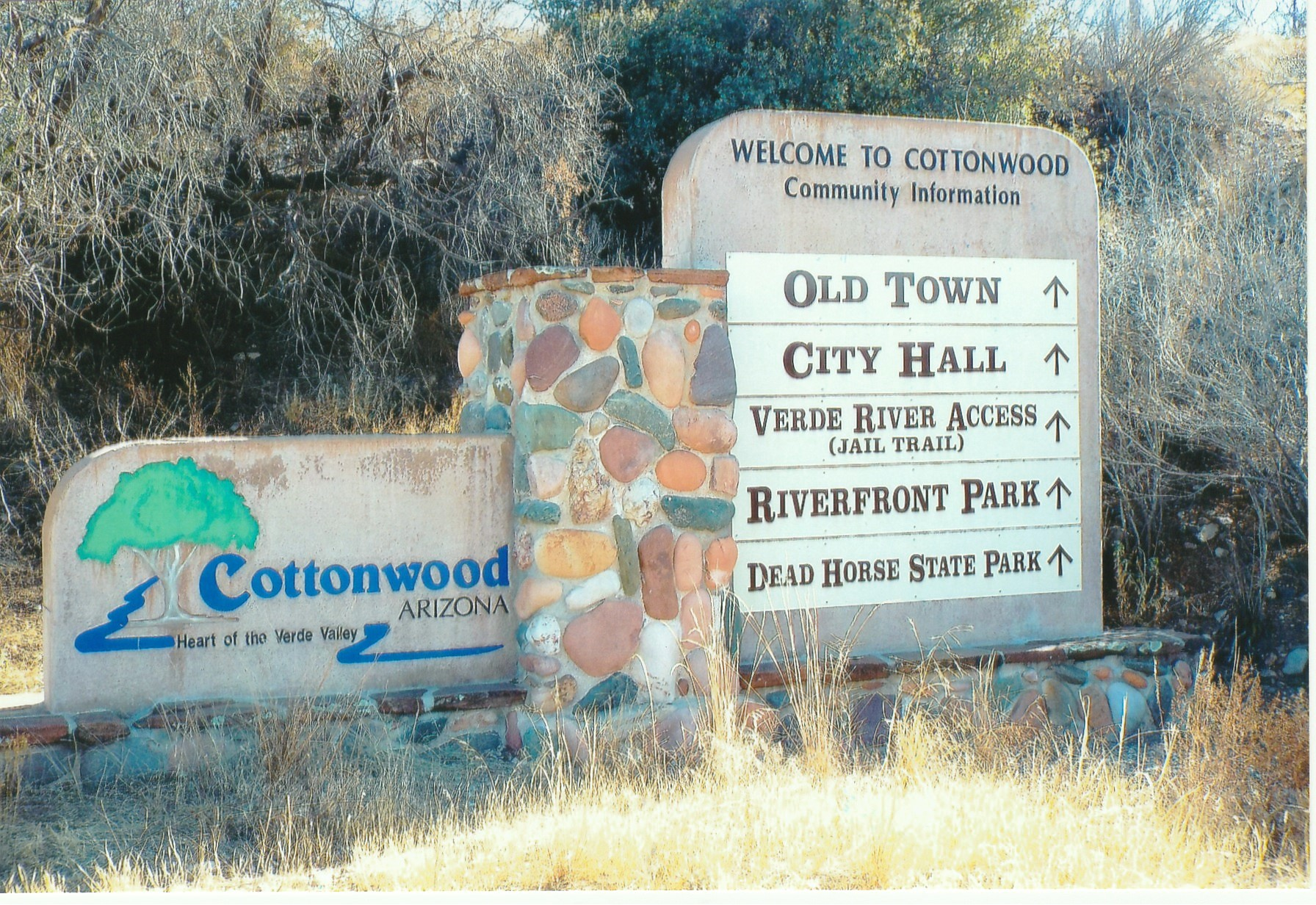
Welcome to Cottonwood

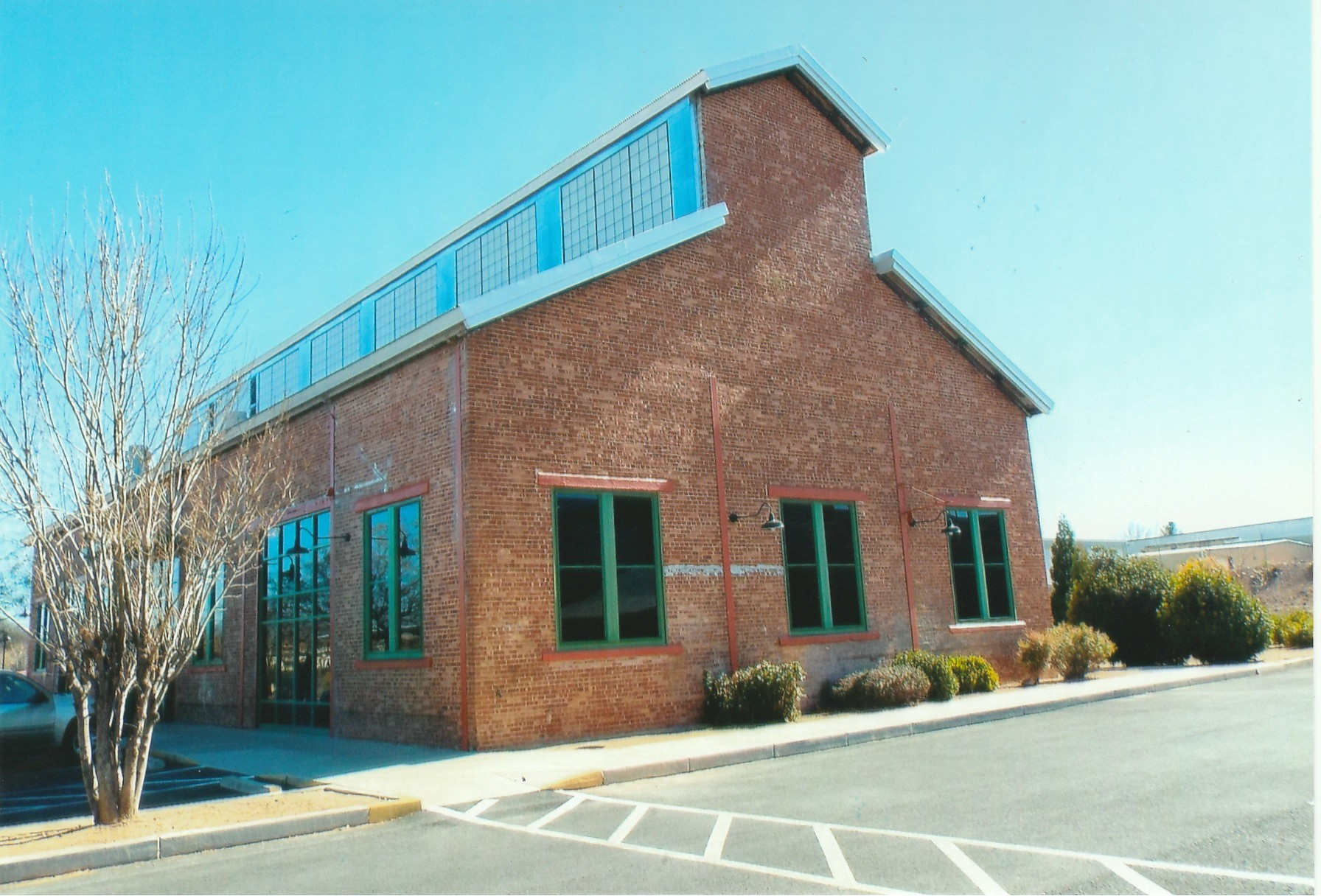
Smelter Machine Shop

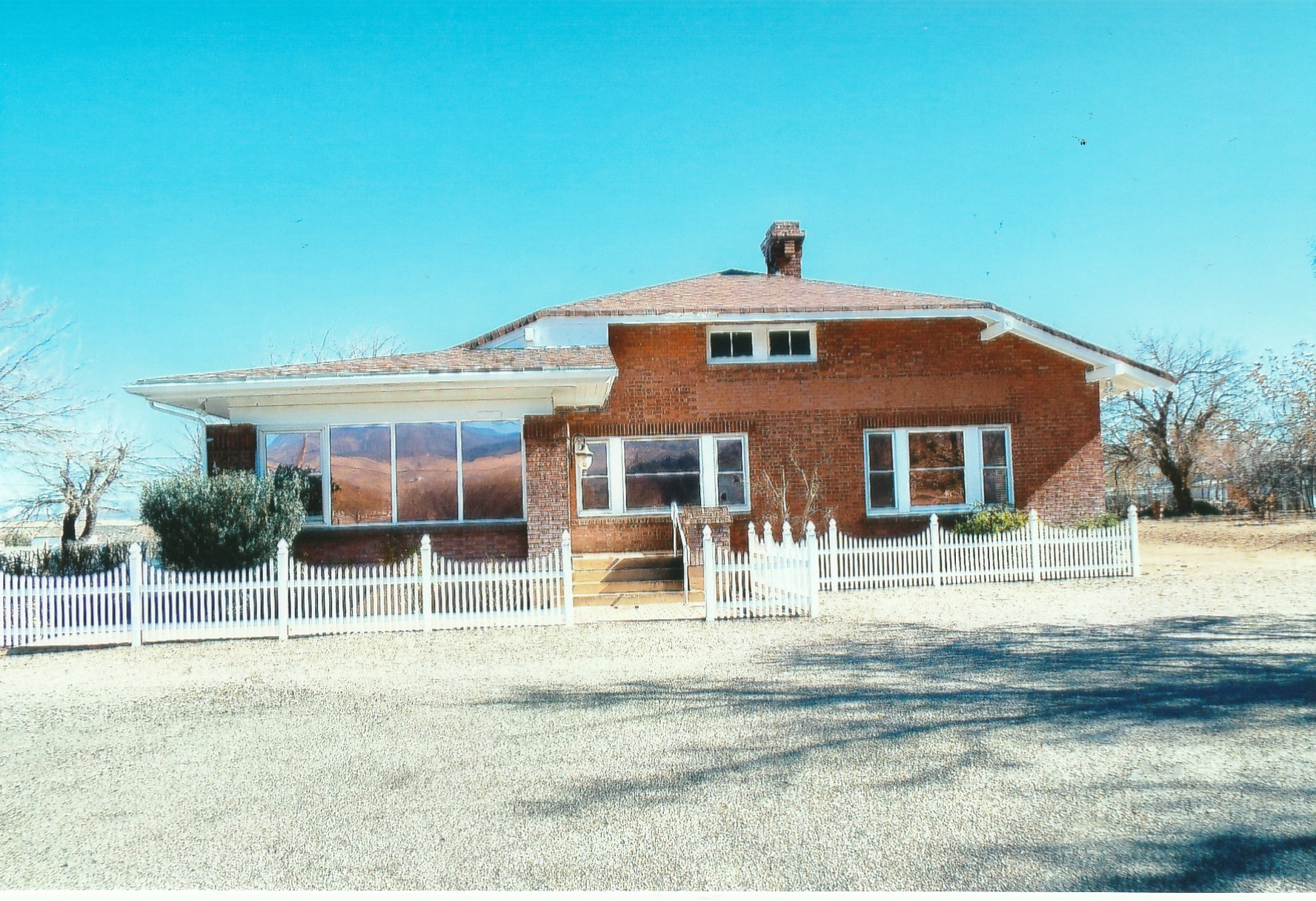
Superintendent Residence

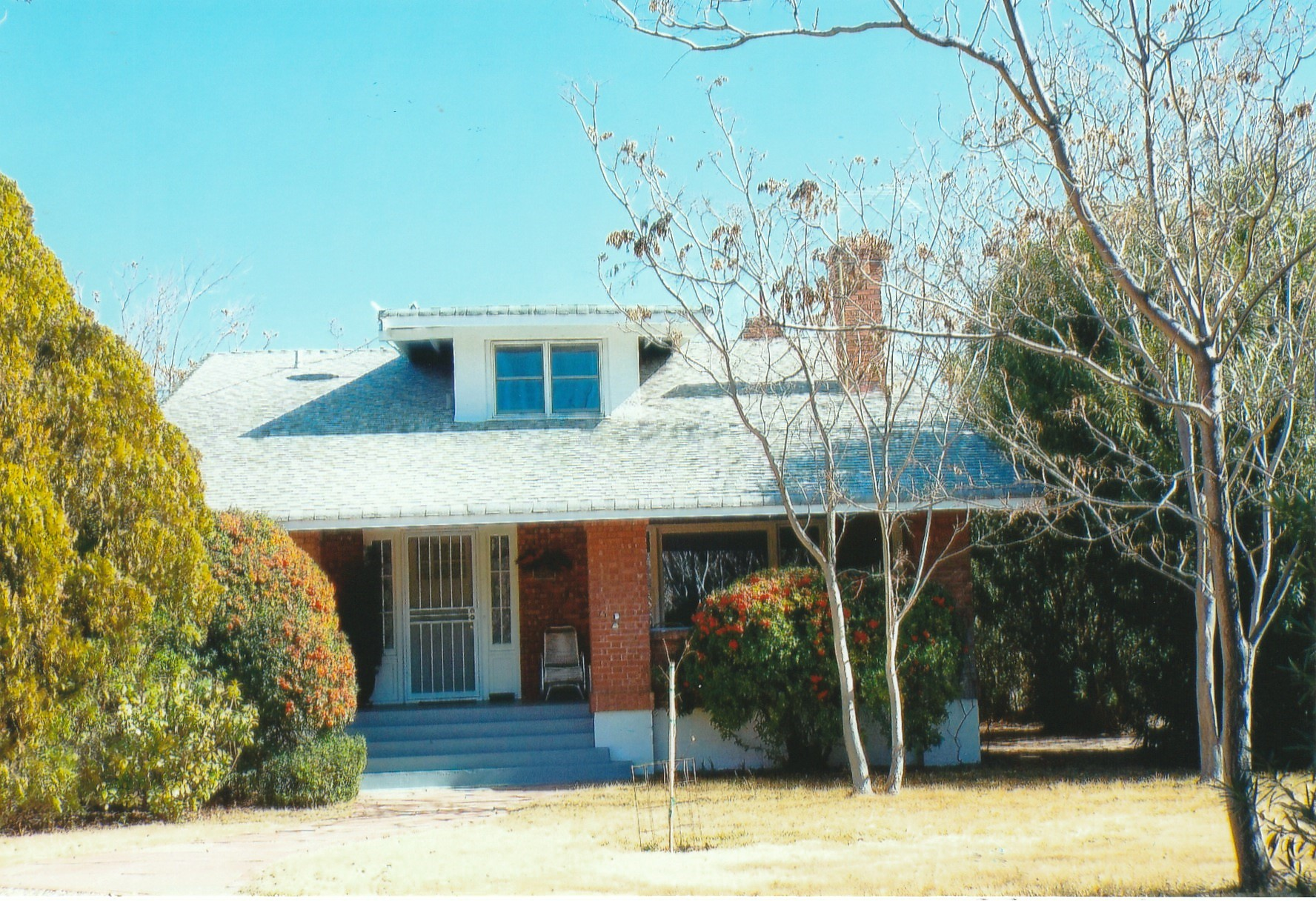
Master Mechanic's House

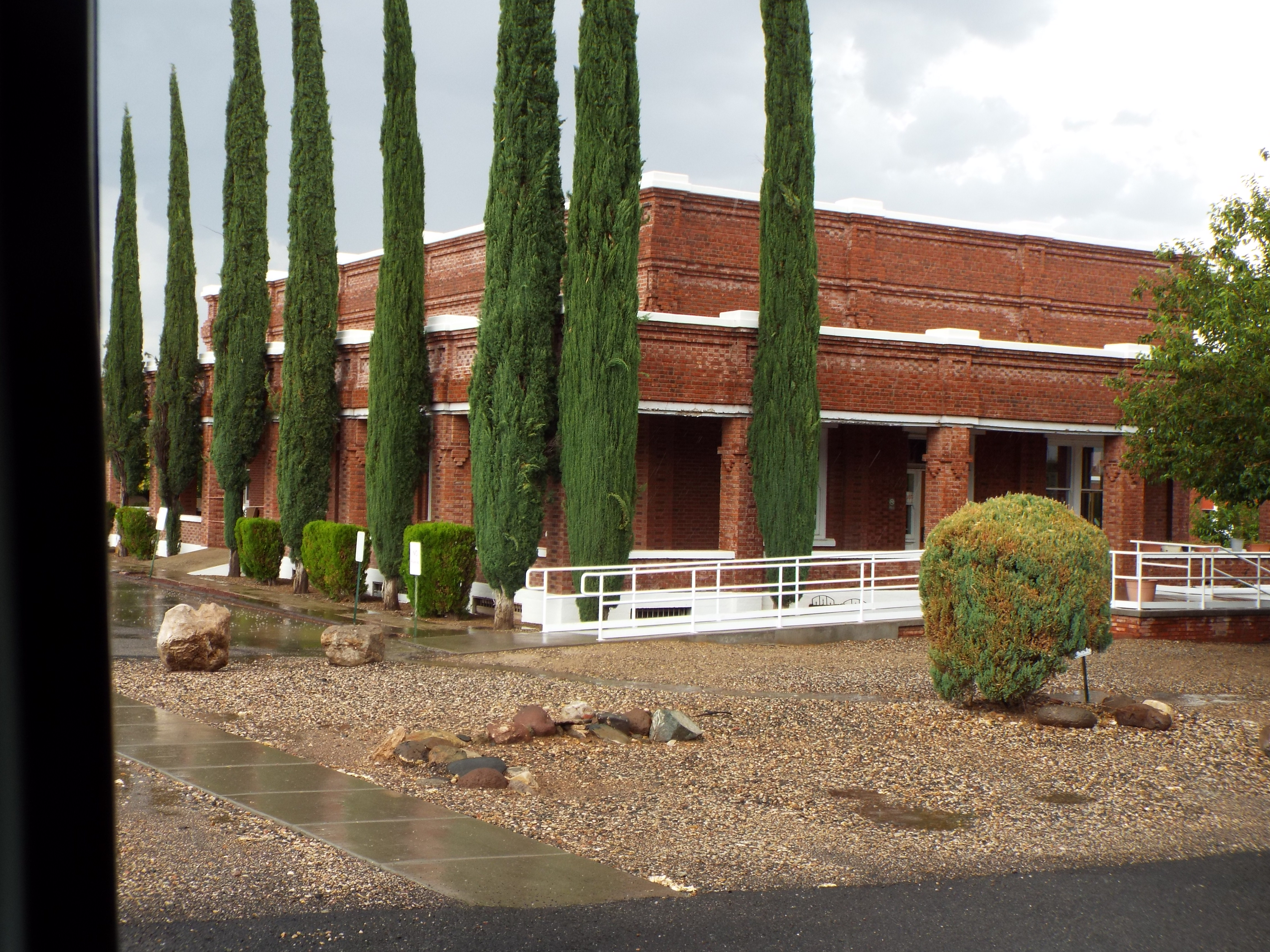
UVX Smelter Operations Complex #1

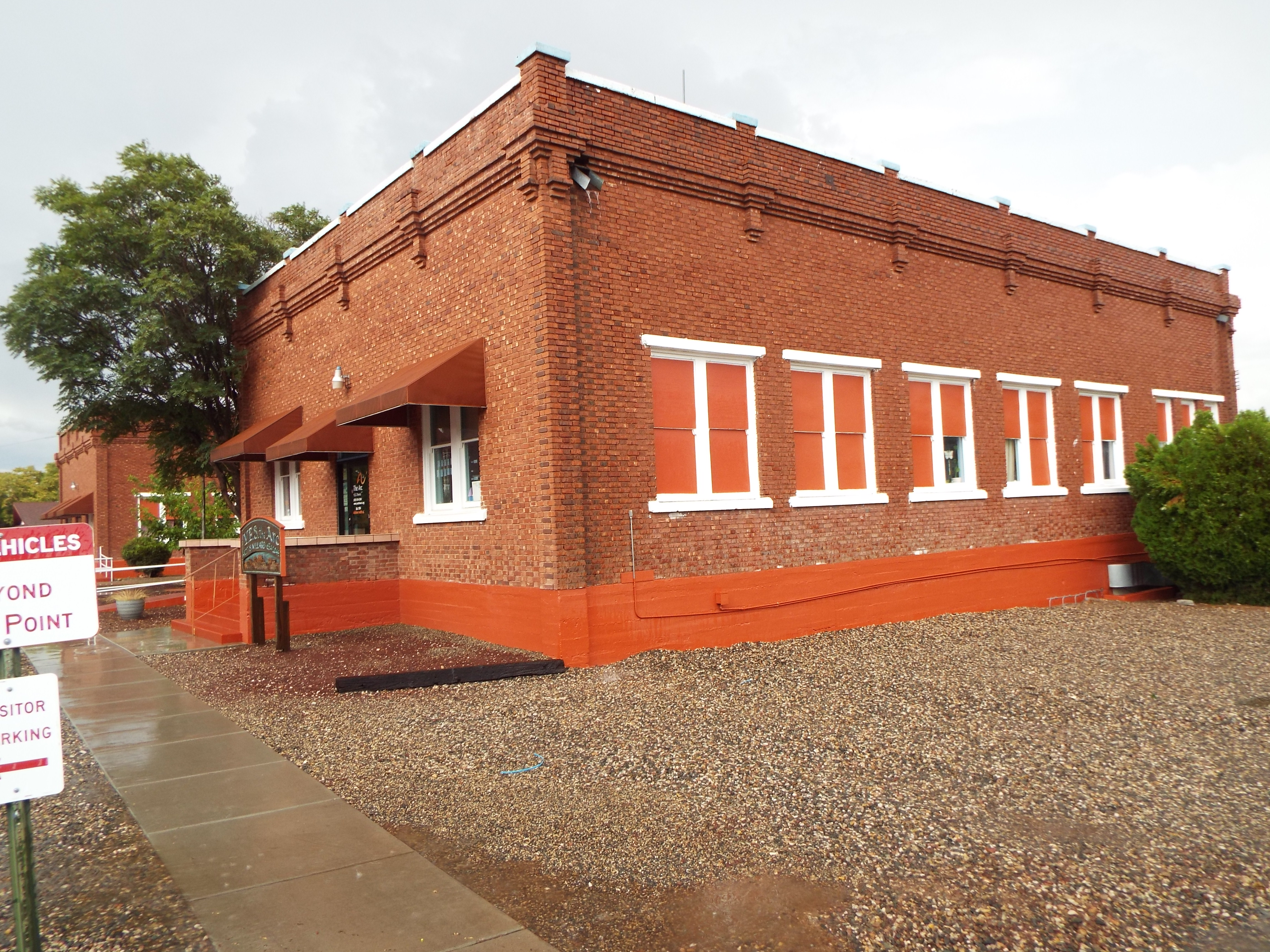
UVX Smelter Operations Complex #2

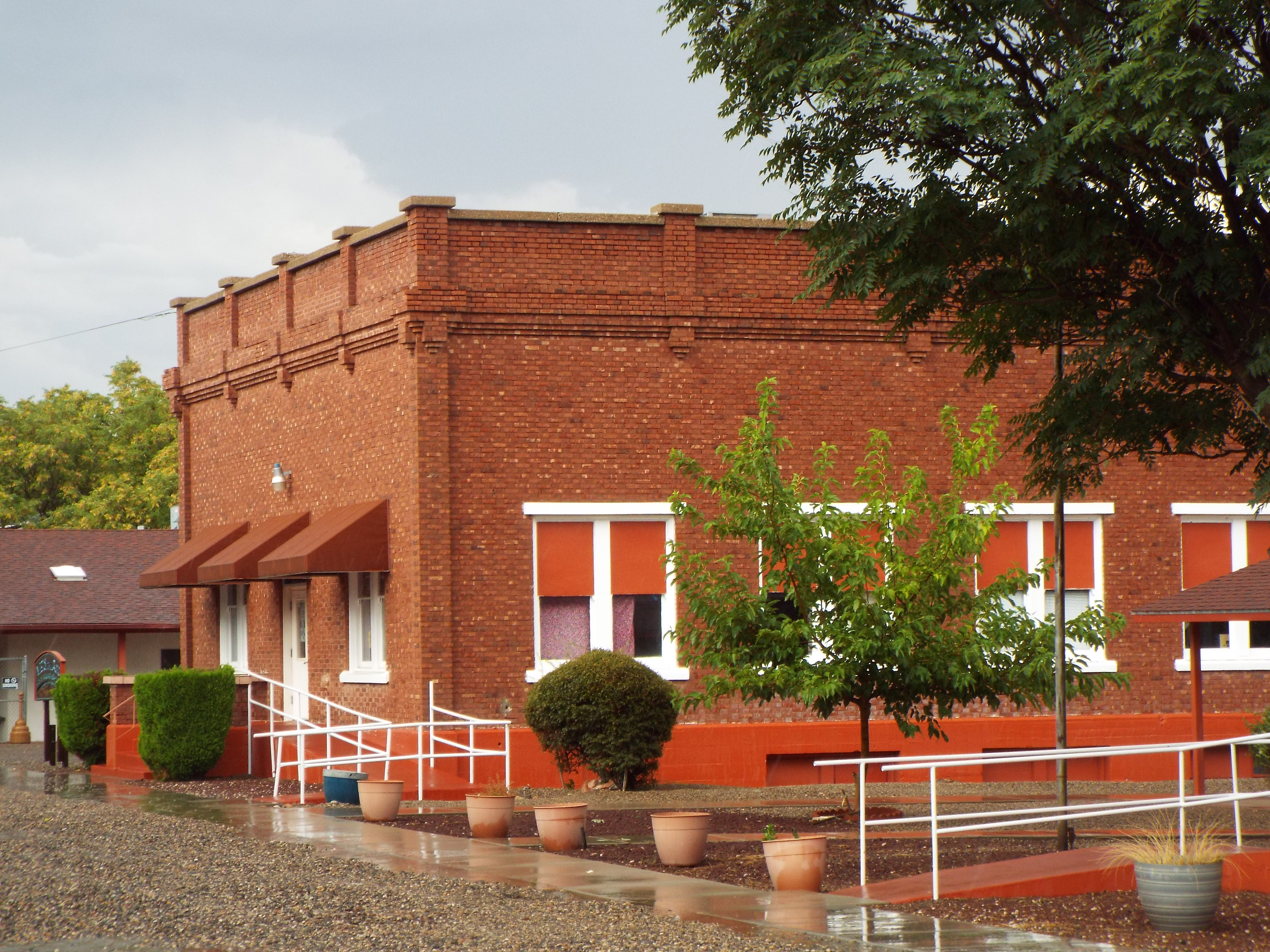
UVX Smelter Operations Complex #3

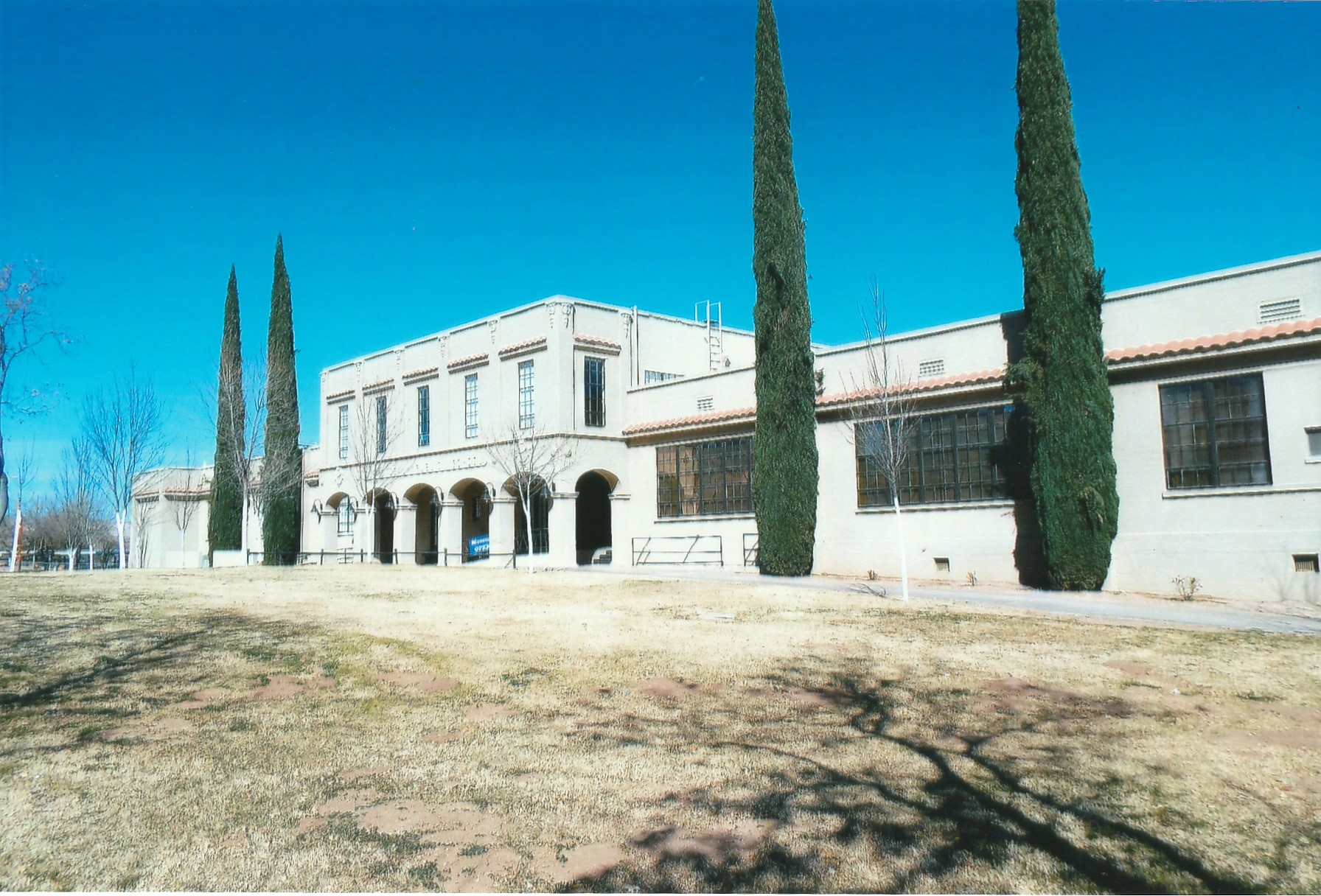
Clemenceau Public School

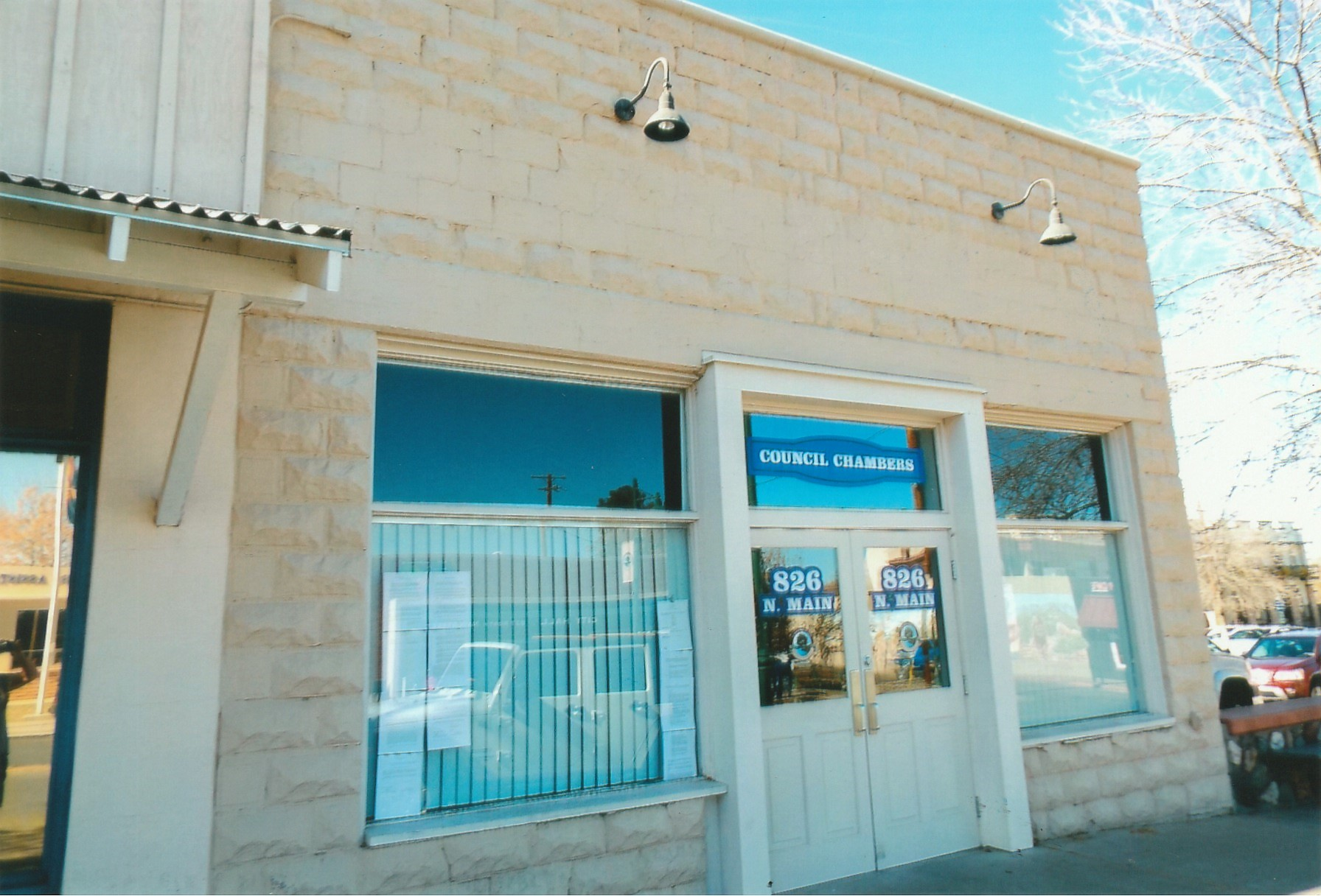
Building on 826 Main Street

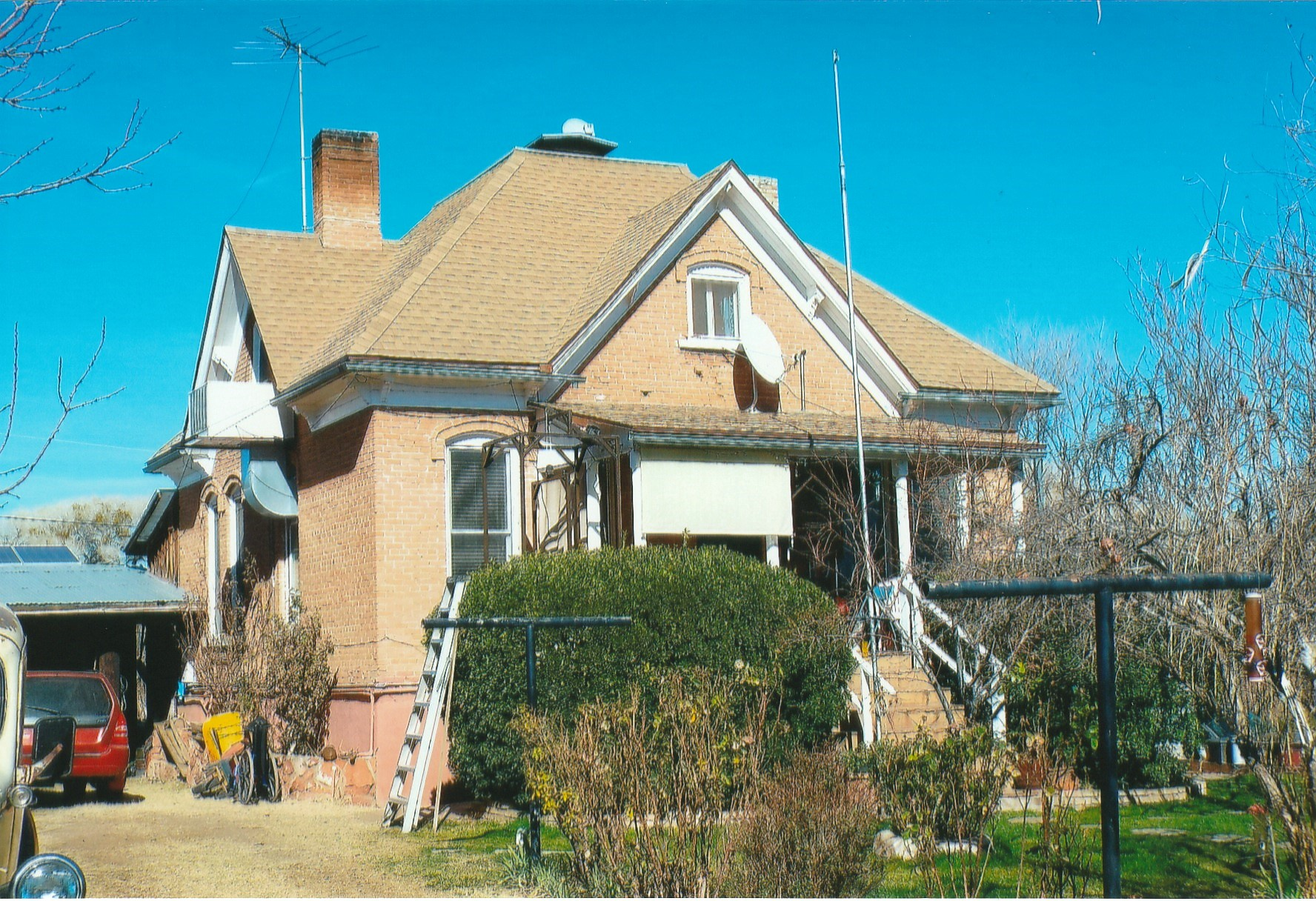
Mary Willard's House

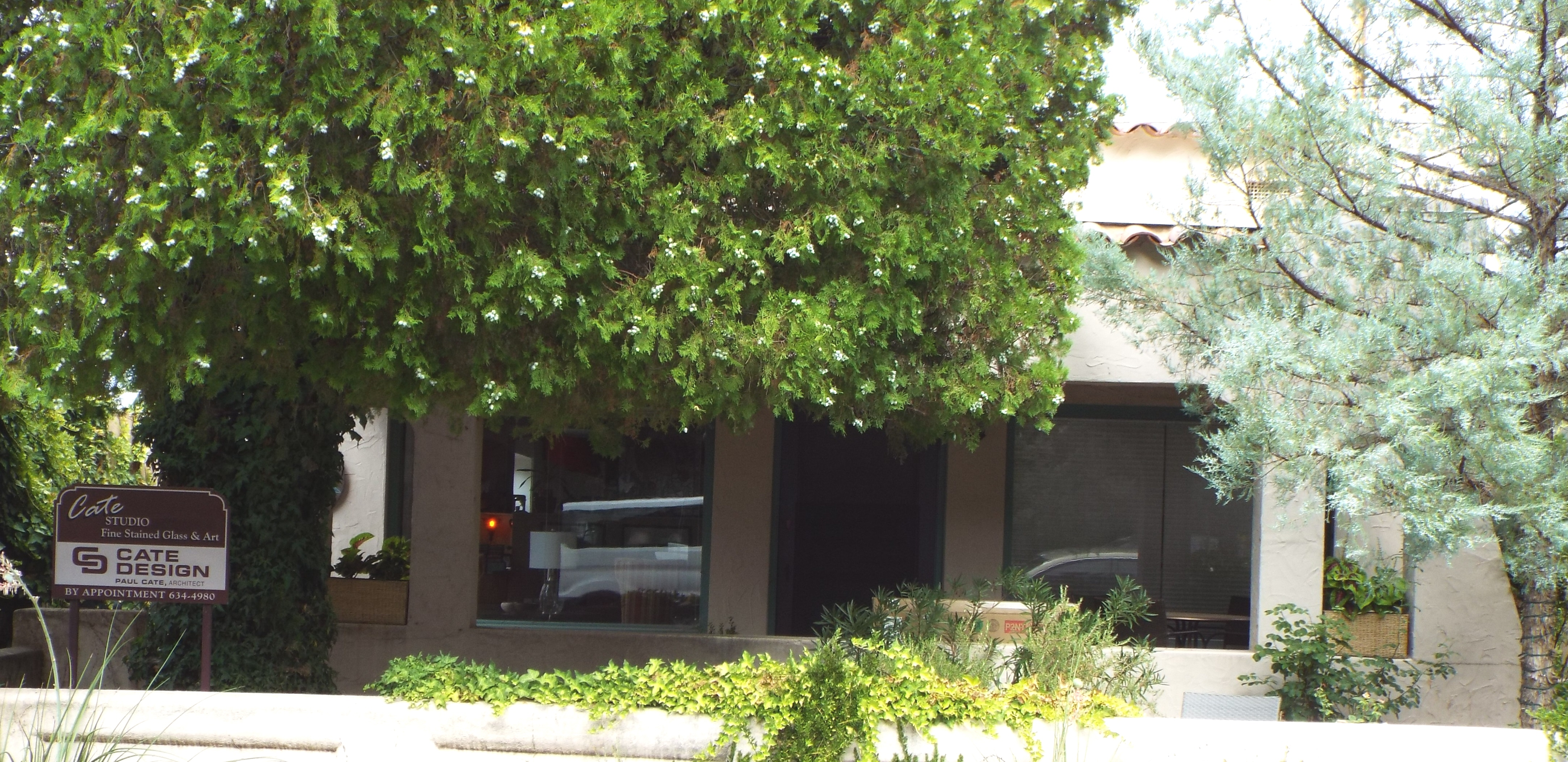
Edens House

== Cottonwood Commercial Historic District ==
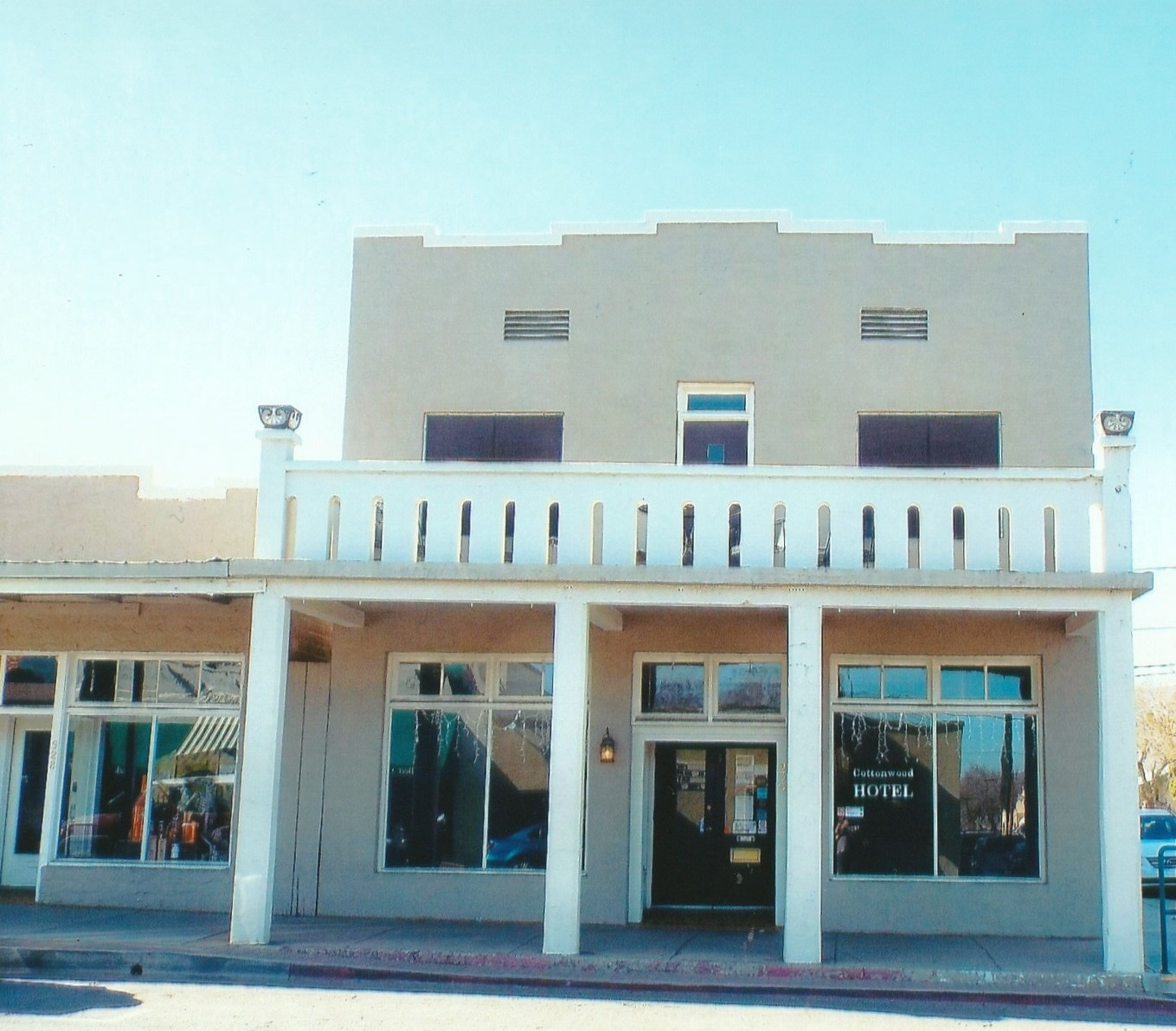
Cottonwood Hotel

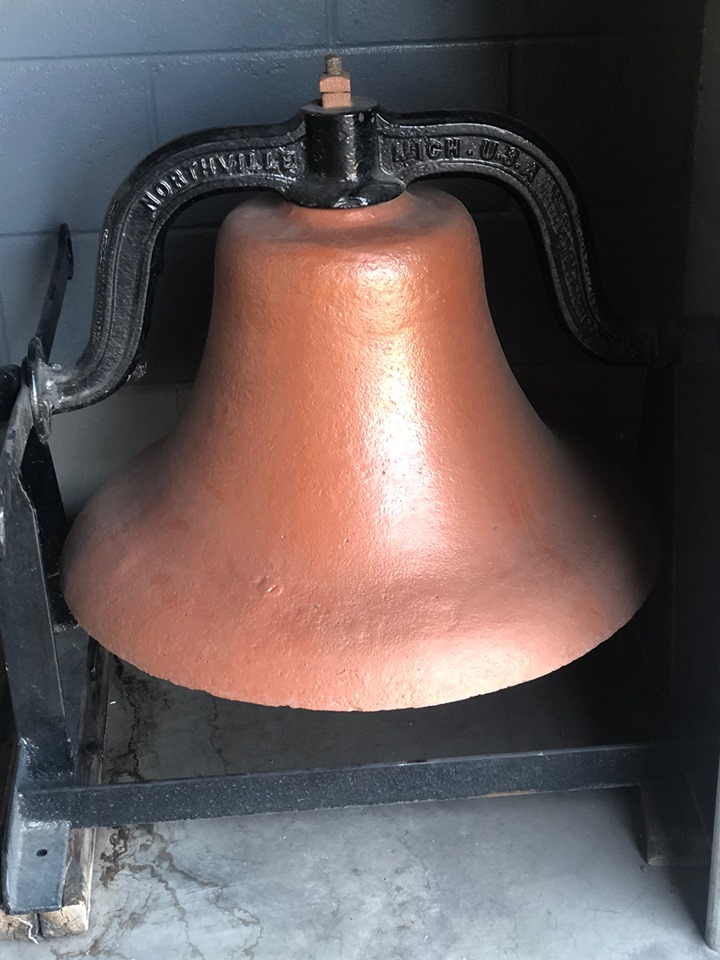
Historic town Fire Bell

The following is a brief description with the images and the original names of the historic properties located within the Cottonwood Commercial Historic District.

- The Bank of Clemenceau building – built in 1918 and is located at 1 N. Willard Street.
- The Old Church building – built in 1900 and is located at 421 S. Willard Street.
- The Cottonwood Civic Center building – built in 1939 and is located at 805 N. Main Street.
- The Bank of Arizona building is located at 816 N. Main Street Cottonwood, AZ 86326. Opened Jan 25, 1954 as the "most modern" in the state with drive-in teller and complete Air Conditioning. It housed the City of Cottonwood police department until a consolidated police, fire, EMS presence was constructed on 6th Street in the 1990s. The building was then occupied by the City Finance & Human Resource Office for 30 years. In 2023, the building was sold to Four-Eight Wineworks as retail space, to accommodate an emerging wine industry.
- The Welcome Sign Originally Shep's Liquor store sign was installed about the time of the incorporation of the Town of Cottonwood in 1960. 50 years later under the guidance of Mrs. Ledbetter it was transformed to welcome people to Cottonwood. If it wasn't for her persistence, rumor has it that it may have been transformed to a flag pole instead.
- The Carlson's 5 & 10 Store building – built in 1939 and is located at 909 N. Main Street.
- The Sprouse-Reitz 5 & 10 Store building – built in 1933 and is located at 913 N. Main Street.
- The Cottonwood Hotel – built in 1917 and is located at 930 N. Main Street. Mae West stayed there and so did John Wayne and Gail Russell during their filming of ‘Angel & the Badman’ in 1946.
- The historic town Fire Bell – The town Fire Bell was placed on the roof of the Cottonwood Hotel after it was rebuilt in 1925. Joe Hall, who was the town fire chief, would ring the bell when a town fire broke out. The bell remained on top of the Cottonwood Hotel until 1960 after Cottonwood was incorporated and a fire department was built.
- Joe Hall's House – built in 1917 and is located at 1004 N. Main Street. The house was converted into an antique store.
- The Groves-Hansohn Grocery Store – built in 1917 and is located at 1016-18 N. Main Street.
- The Mark Willard Building – built in 1917 and is located at 1008 N. Main Street.
- The Stemmer's Store building – built in 1923 and is located at 1034 N. Main Street.
- The County Jail building – built in 1929 and is located at 1101 N. Main Street. Al Capone inscribed his name on the outside jail cell wall. This jail is in the 1946 movie “Desert Fury” and the 1967 Elvis Presley movie "Stay Away, Joe".
- Black Bert's Service Station – built in 1952 and is located at 794 N. Main Street.

=== Properties in the Commercial Historic District which are pictured ===
Cottonwood Commercial Historic District.
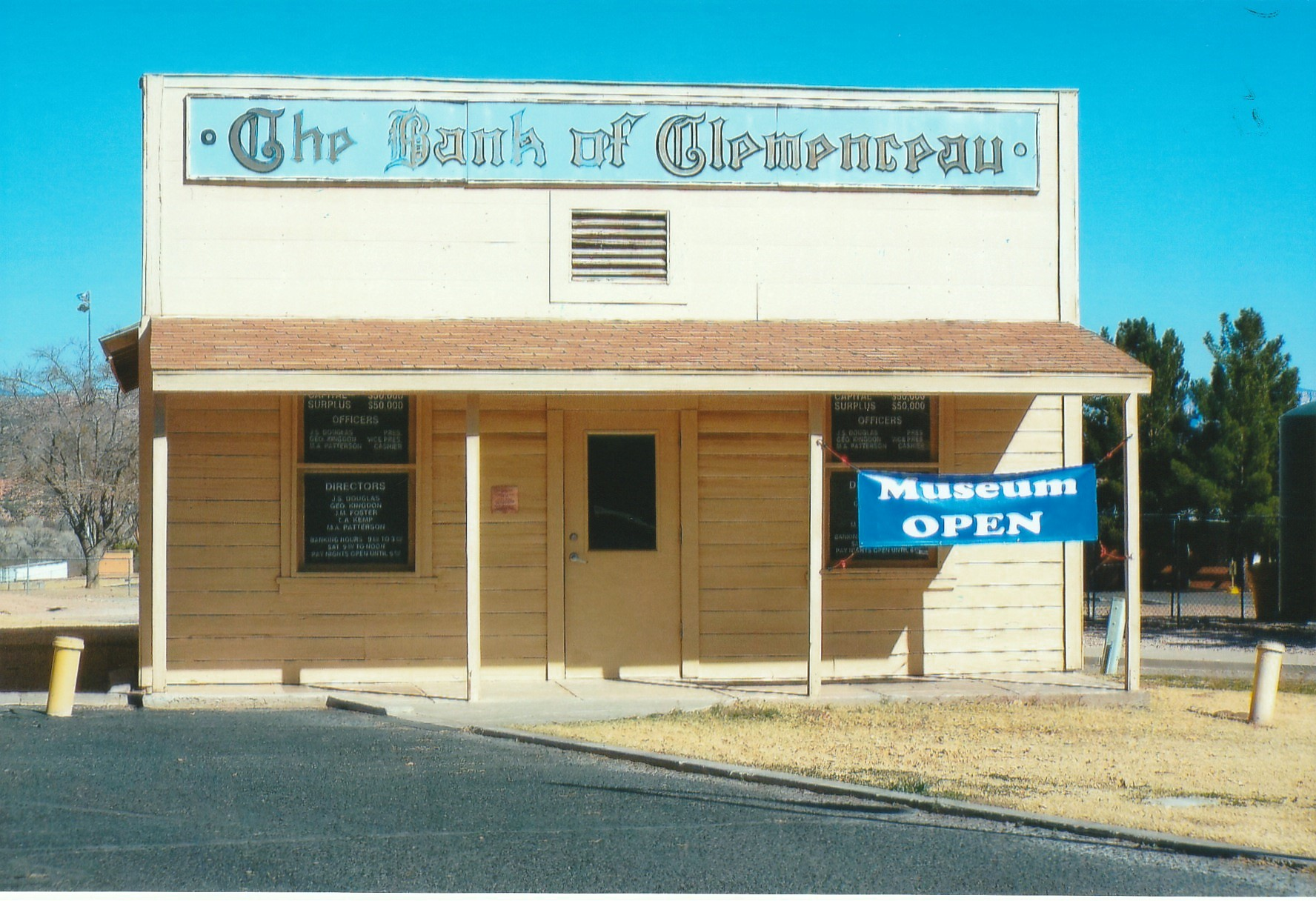
Bank of Clemenceau

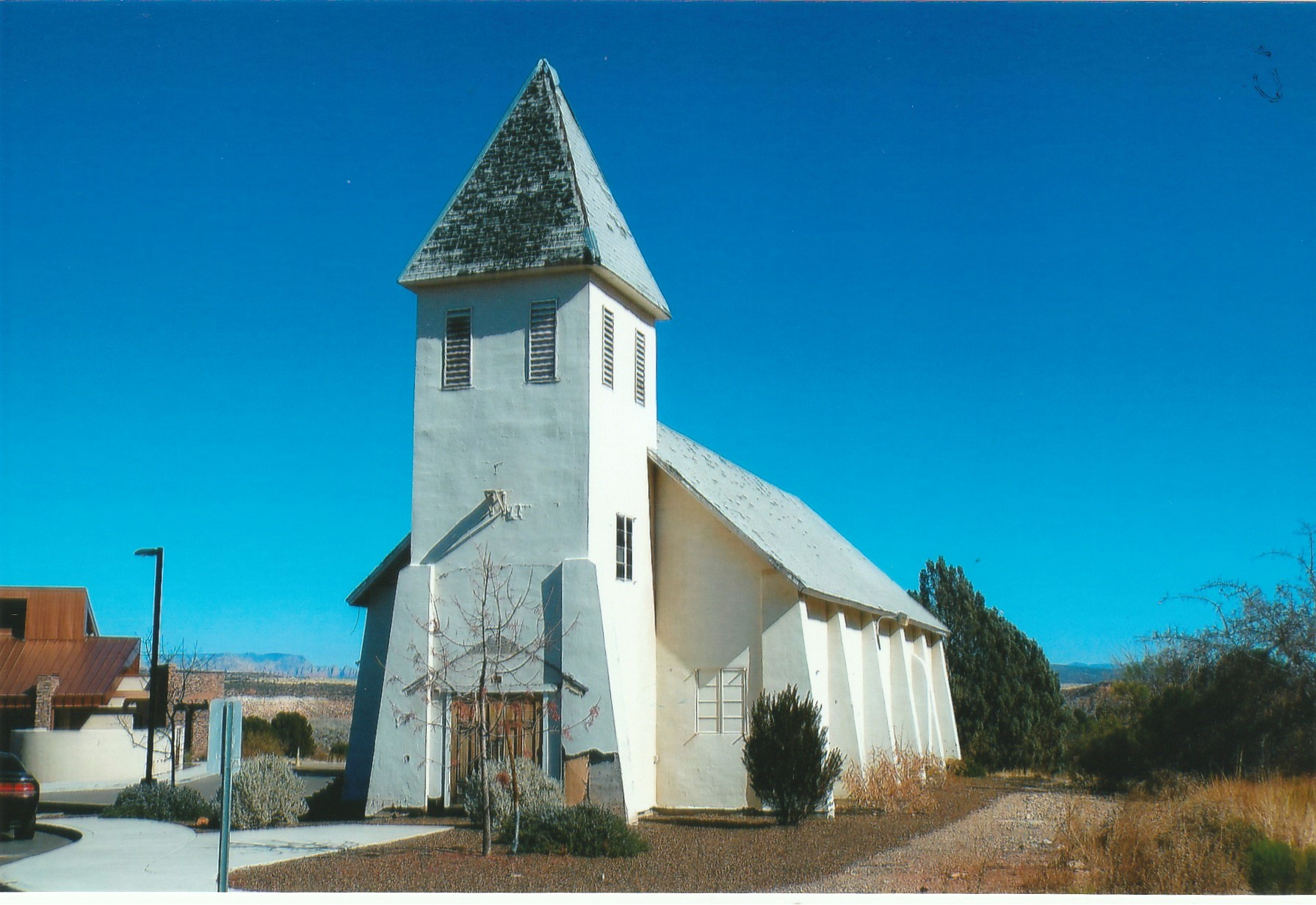
Old Church

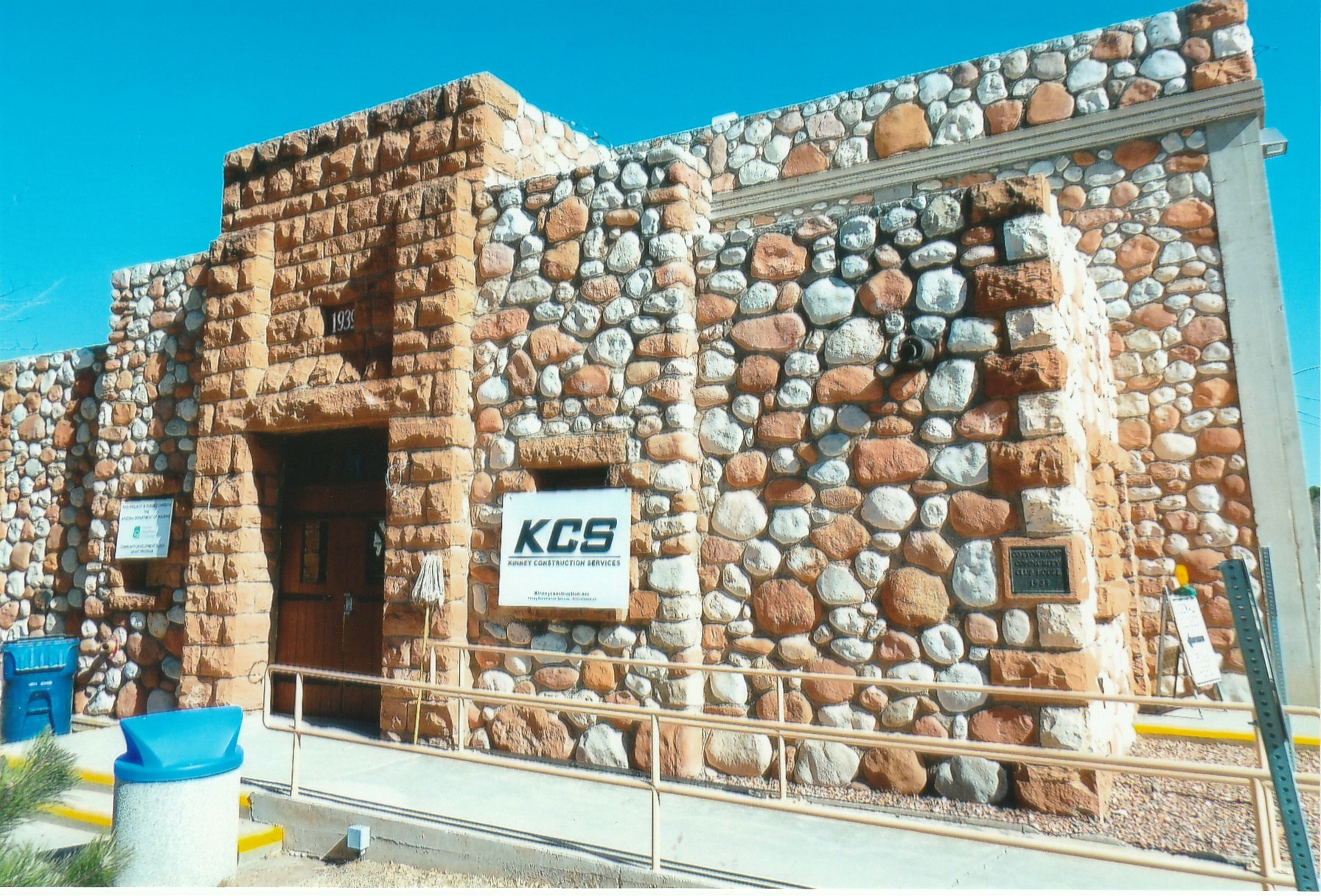
Cottonwood Civic Center

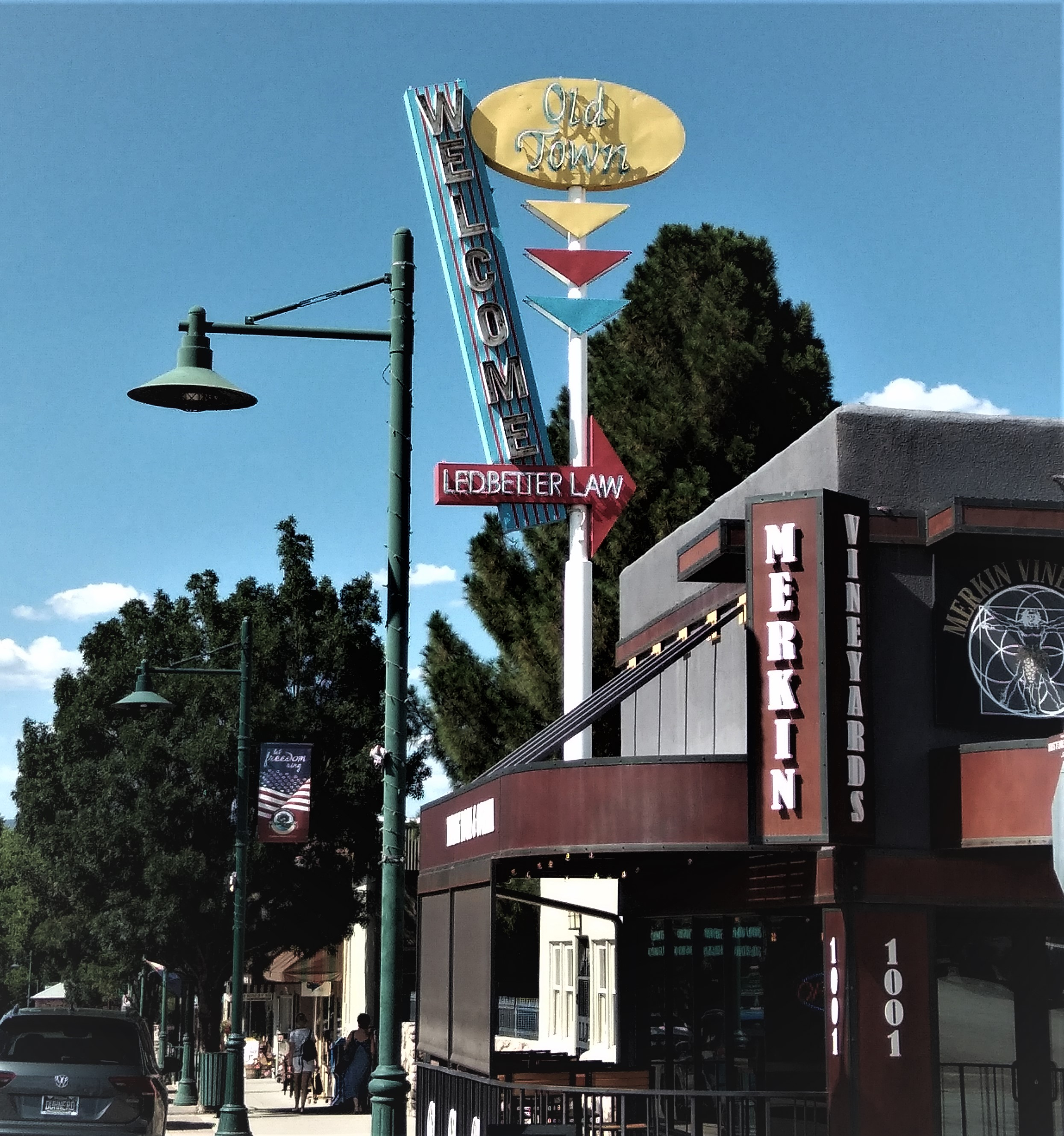
Shep's Welcome Sign after transformation

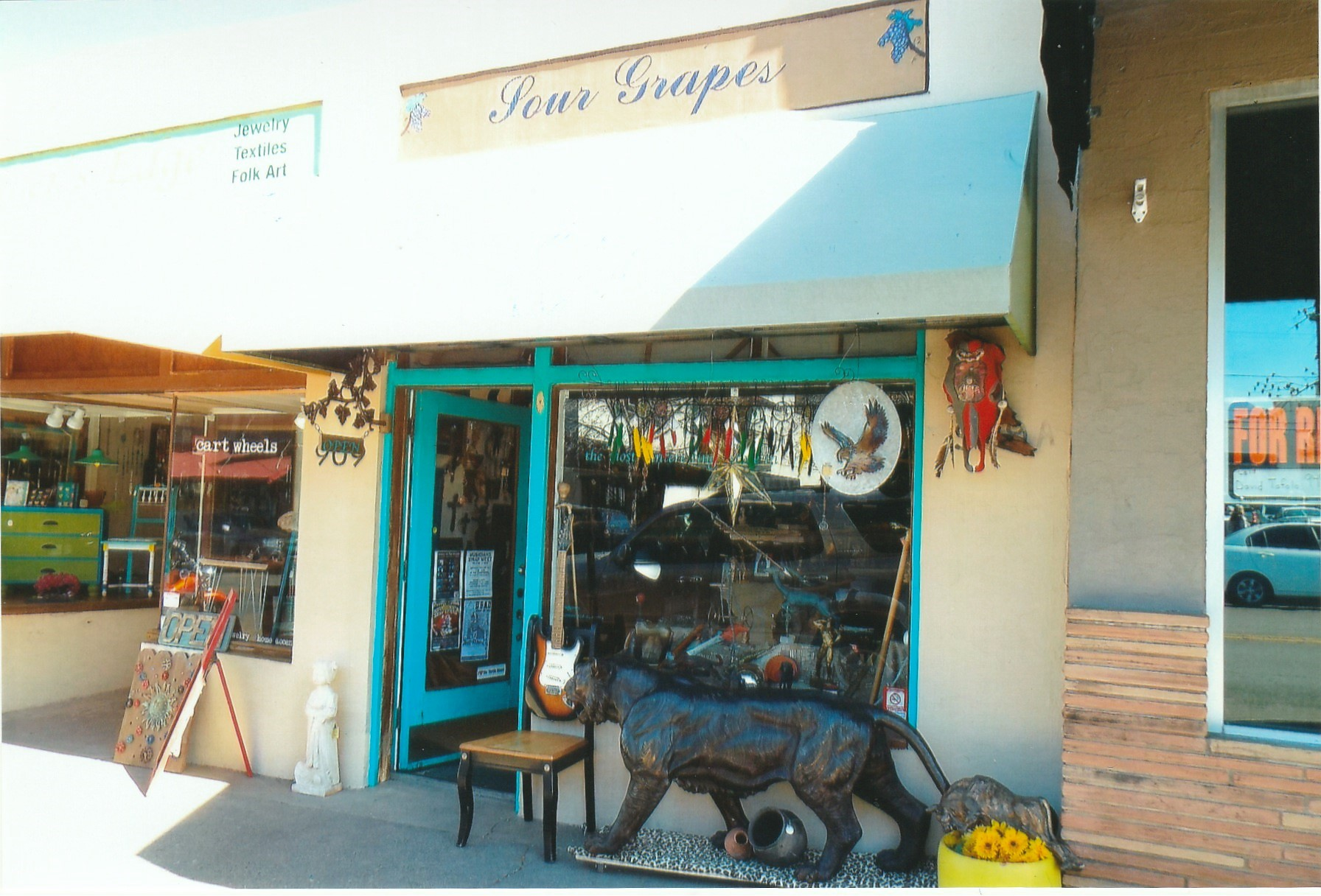
Carlson's 5 & 10 Store

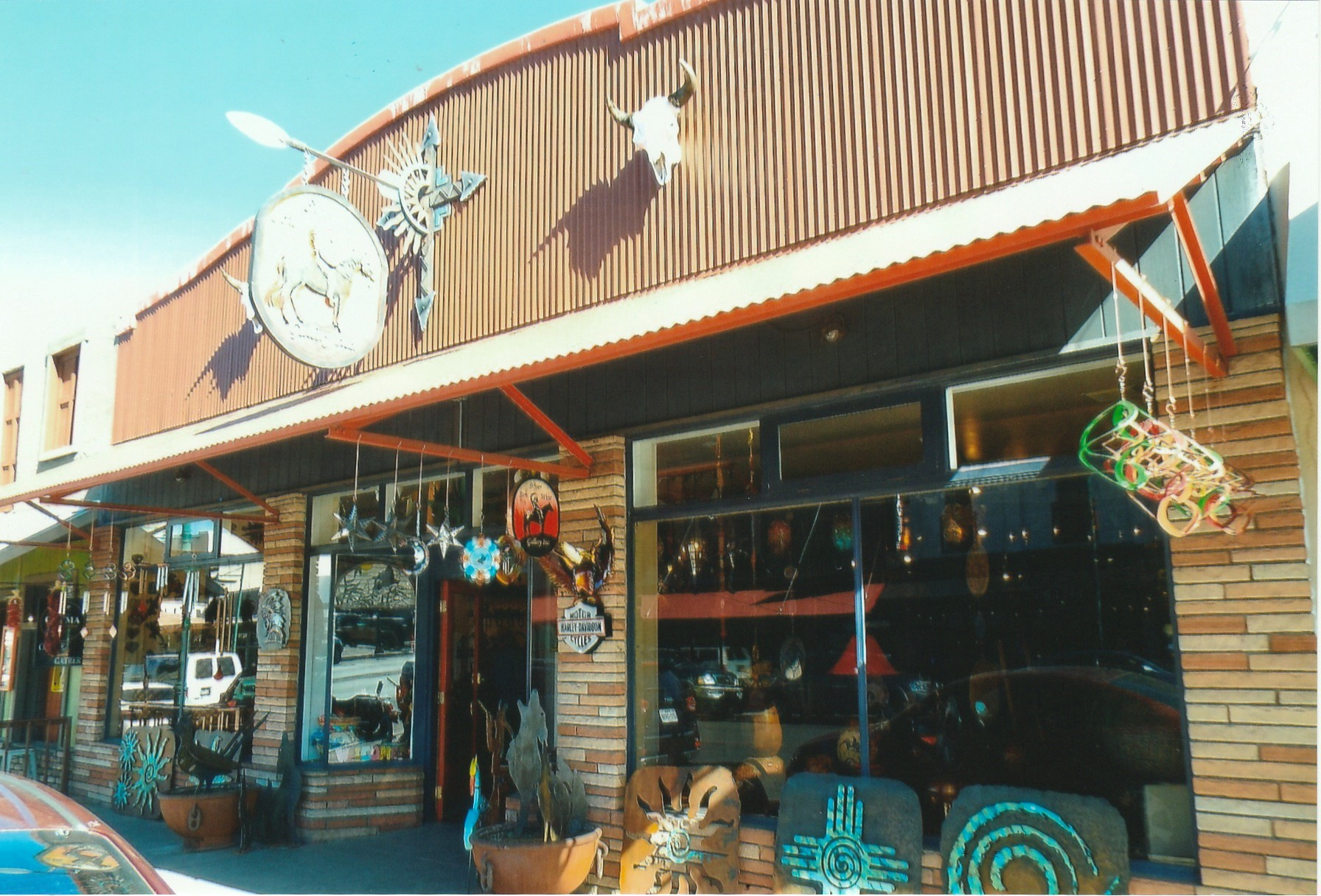
Sprouse-Reitz 5 & 10 Store

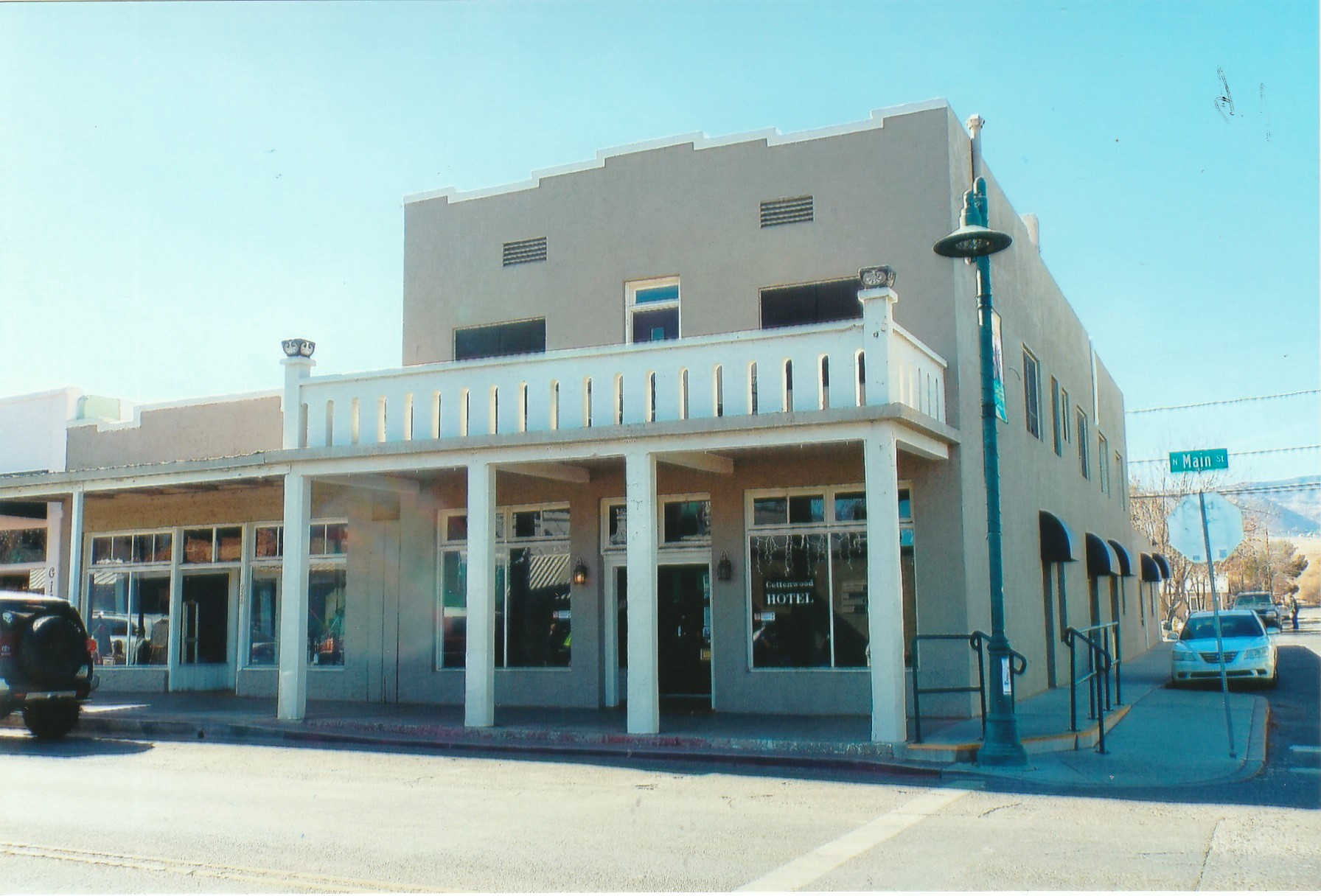
Cottonwood Hotel

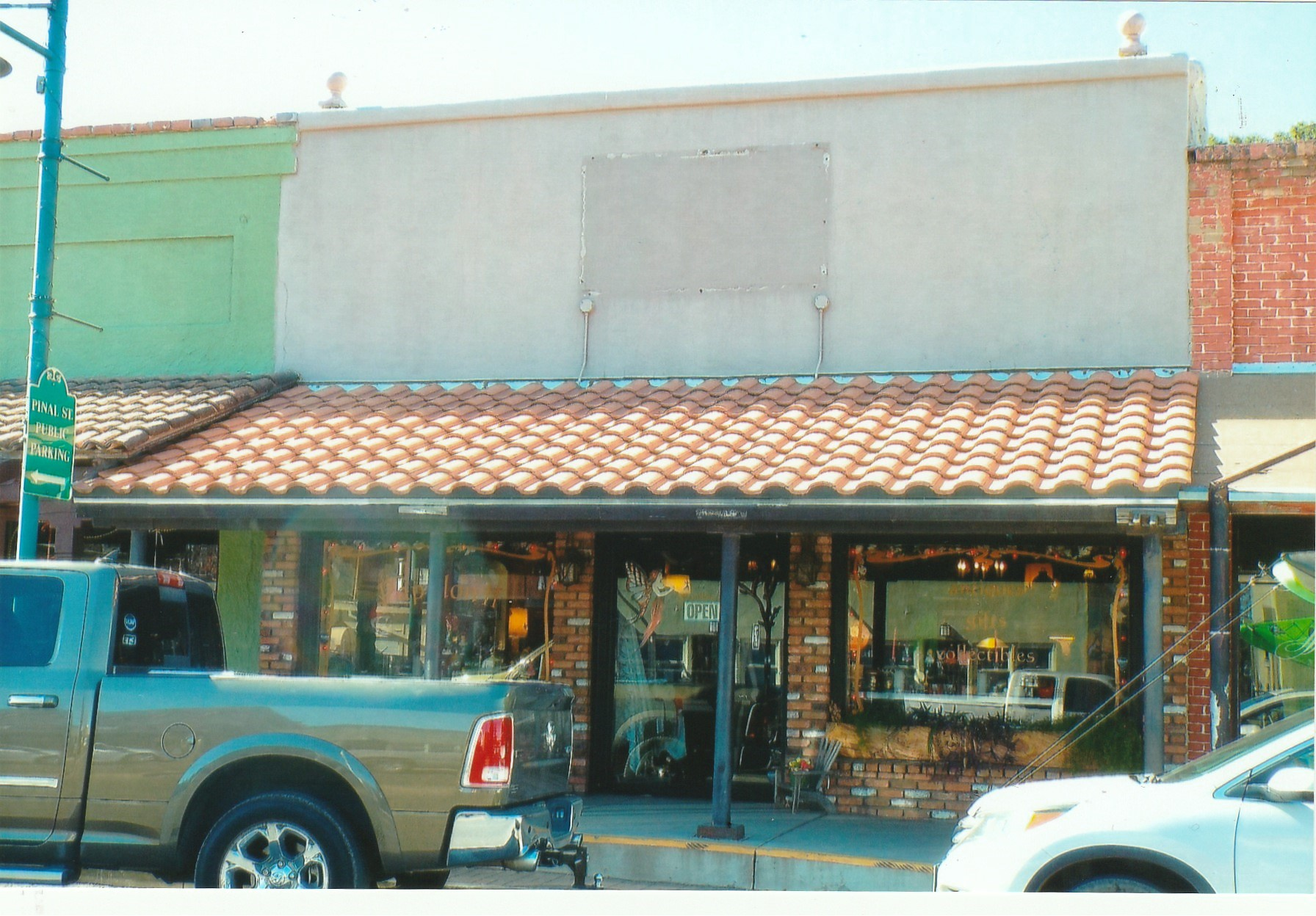
Joe Hall's House

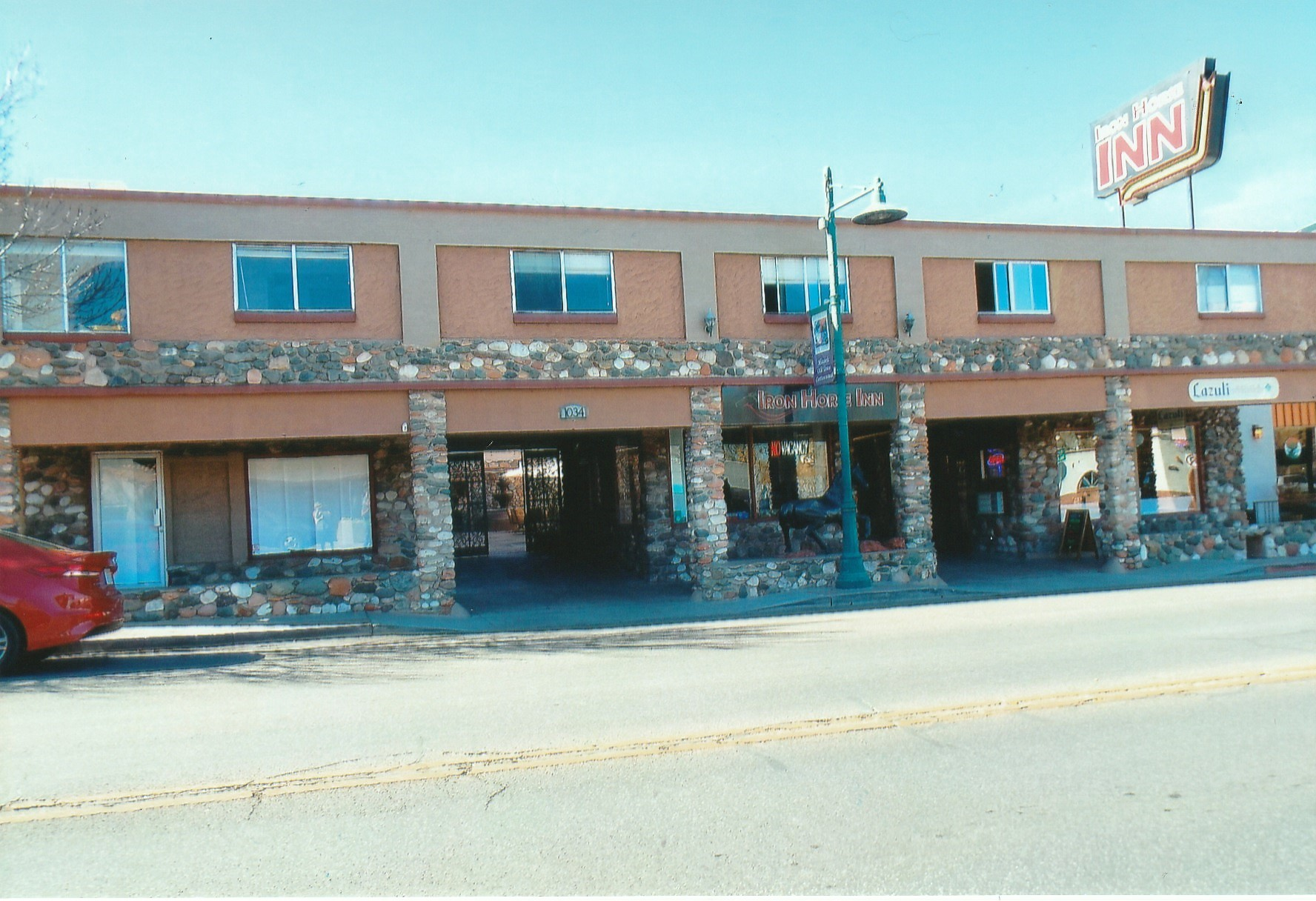
Grove-Hanshon Grocery

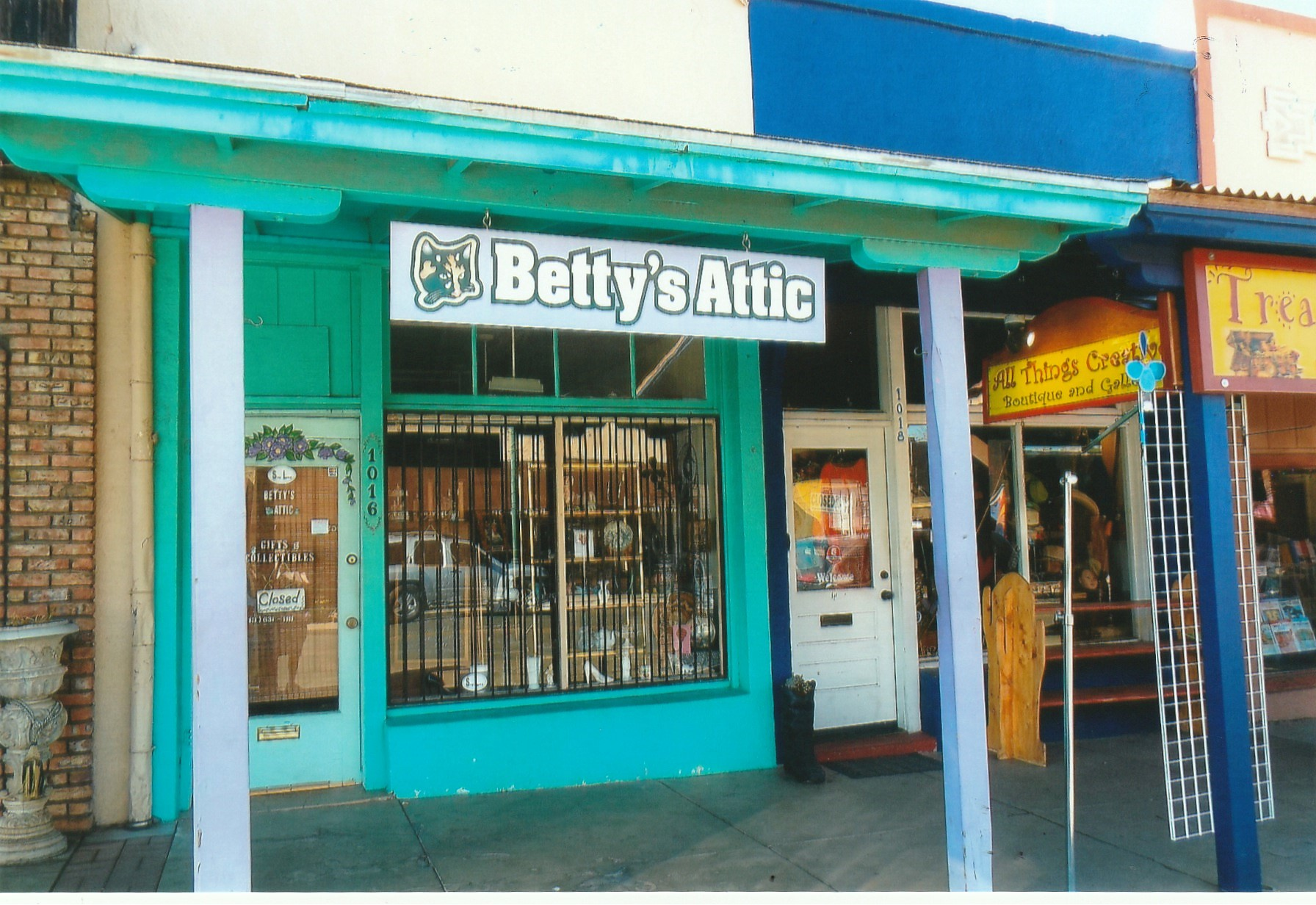
Mark Willard Building

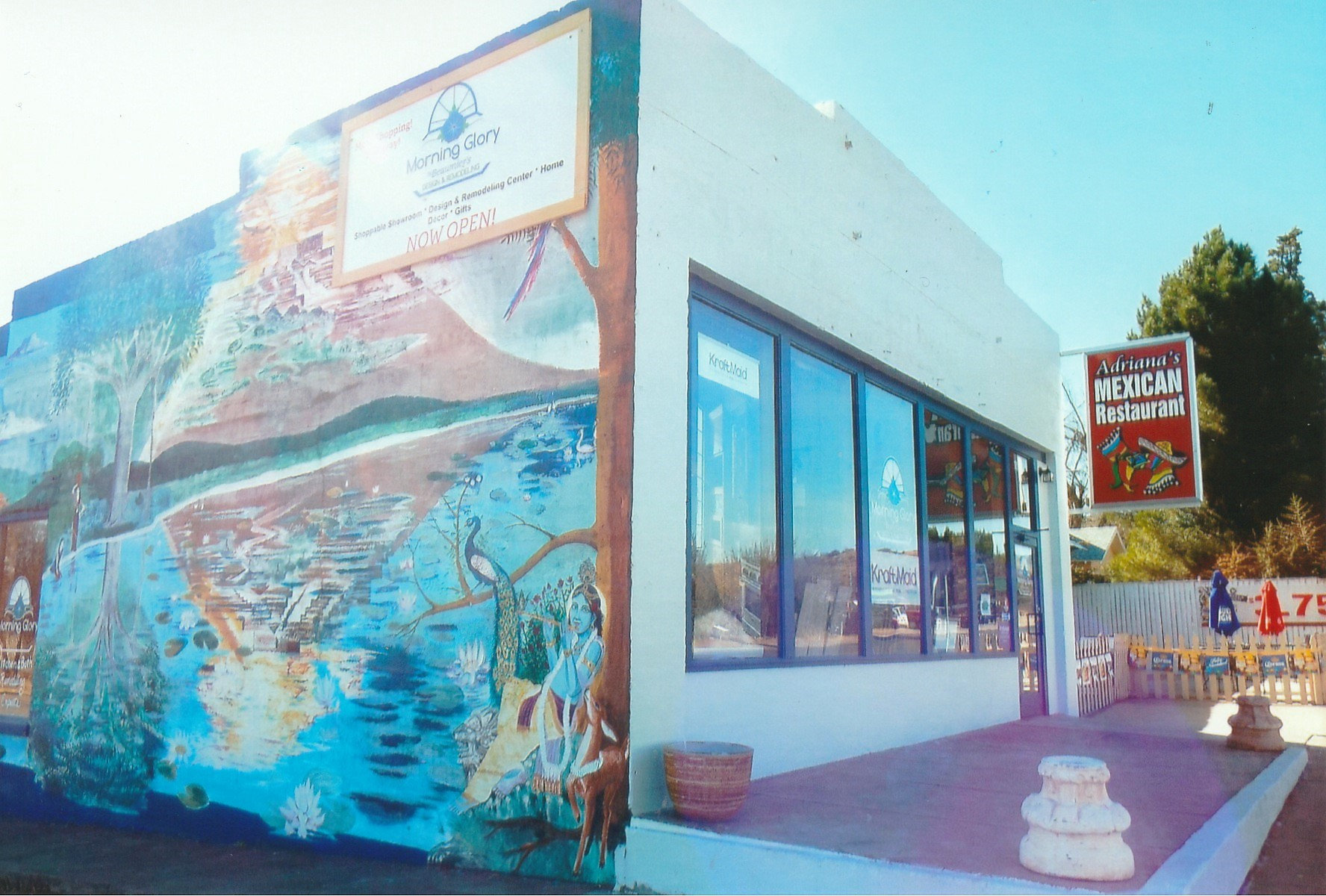
Stemmer's Store

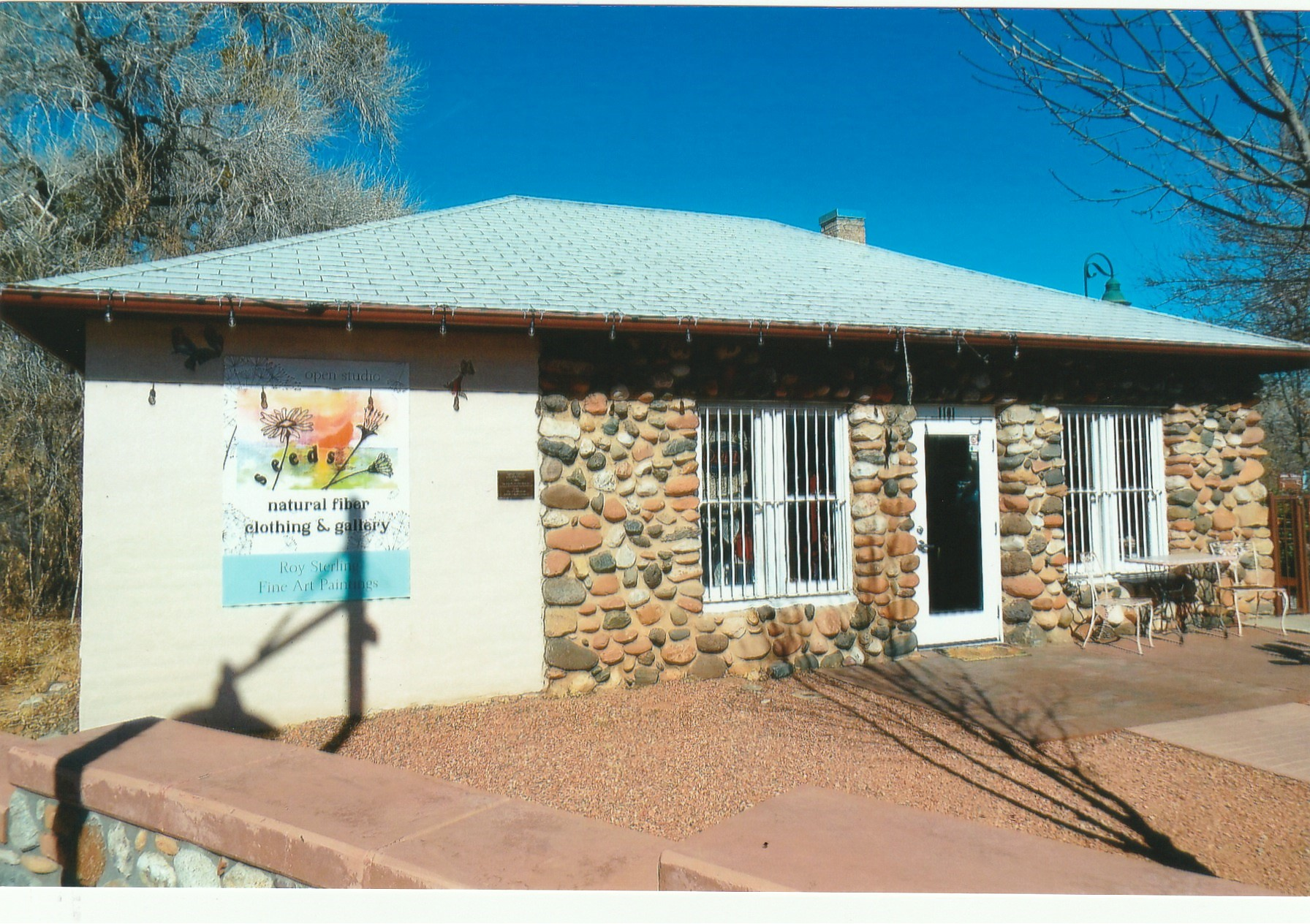
County Jail

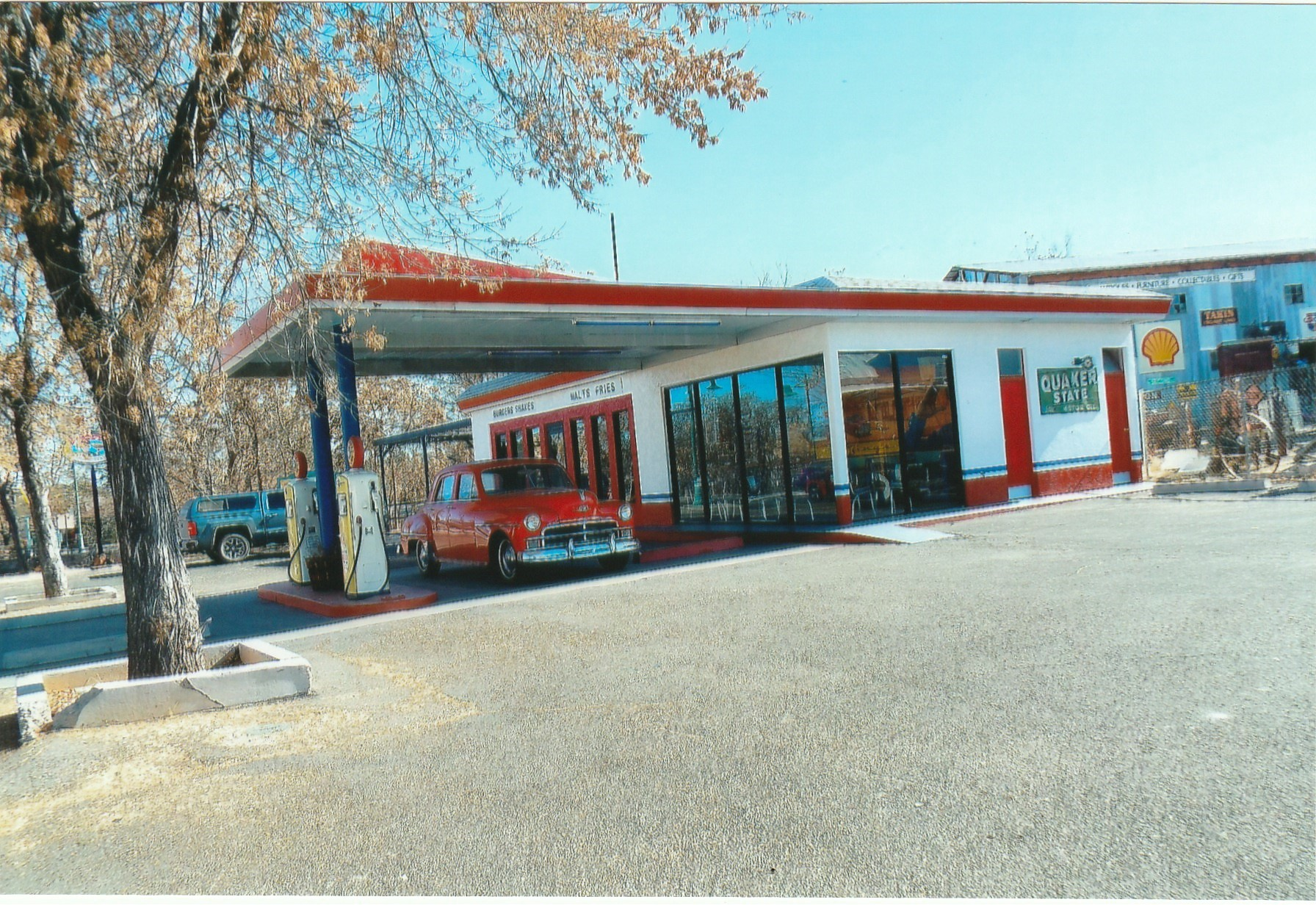
Black Bert's Service Station

== See also ==
- National Register of Historic Places listings in Yavapai County, Arizona
