= Frederick Louis =

Frederick Louis may refer to:

- Frederick Louis, Count of Nassau-Ottweiler
- Frederick Louis, Count Palatine of Zweibrücken
- Frederick Louis, Hereditary Grand Duke of Mecklenburg-Schwerin
- Frederick Louis, Prince of Hohenlohe-Ingelfingen
- Frederick Louis, Prince of Wales
- Frederick Charles Louis, Duke of Schleswig-Holstein-Sonderburg-Beck
- Frederick Louis, Duke of Schleswig-Holstein-Sonderburg-Beck
- Frederick Louis of Württemberg (heir apparent)
- Frederick Louis of Württemberg-Winnental

== See also ==
- Frederick Lewis (disambiguation)
