= P52 =

P52 may refer to:

== Vessels ==
- ARA Piedrabuena (P-52), a patrol vessel of the Argentine Navy
- INS Suvarna (P52), a patrol vessel of the Indian Navy
- LÉ Niamh (P52), a patrol vessel of the Irish Naval Service
- Maltese patrol boat P52
- ORP Dzik (P52), a submarine of the Polish Navy

== Other uses ==
- Bell XP-52, an American fighter aircraft design project
- Cottonwood Airport, in Yavapai County, Arizona, United States
- NFKB2, nuclear factor NF-κB p100 subunit
- Rylands Library Papyrus P52, a manuscript of the Gospel of John
- P52, a state regional road in Latvia
