= Building at 826 North Main Street =

United States historic place in Cottonwood, Arizona

- U.S. National Register of Historic Places
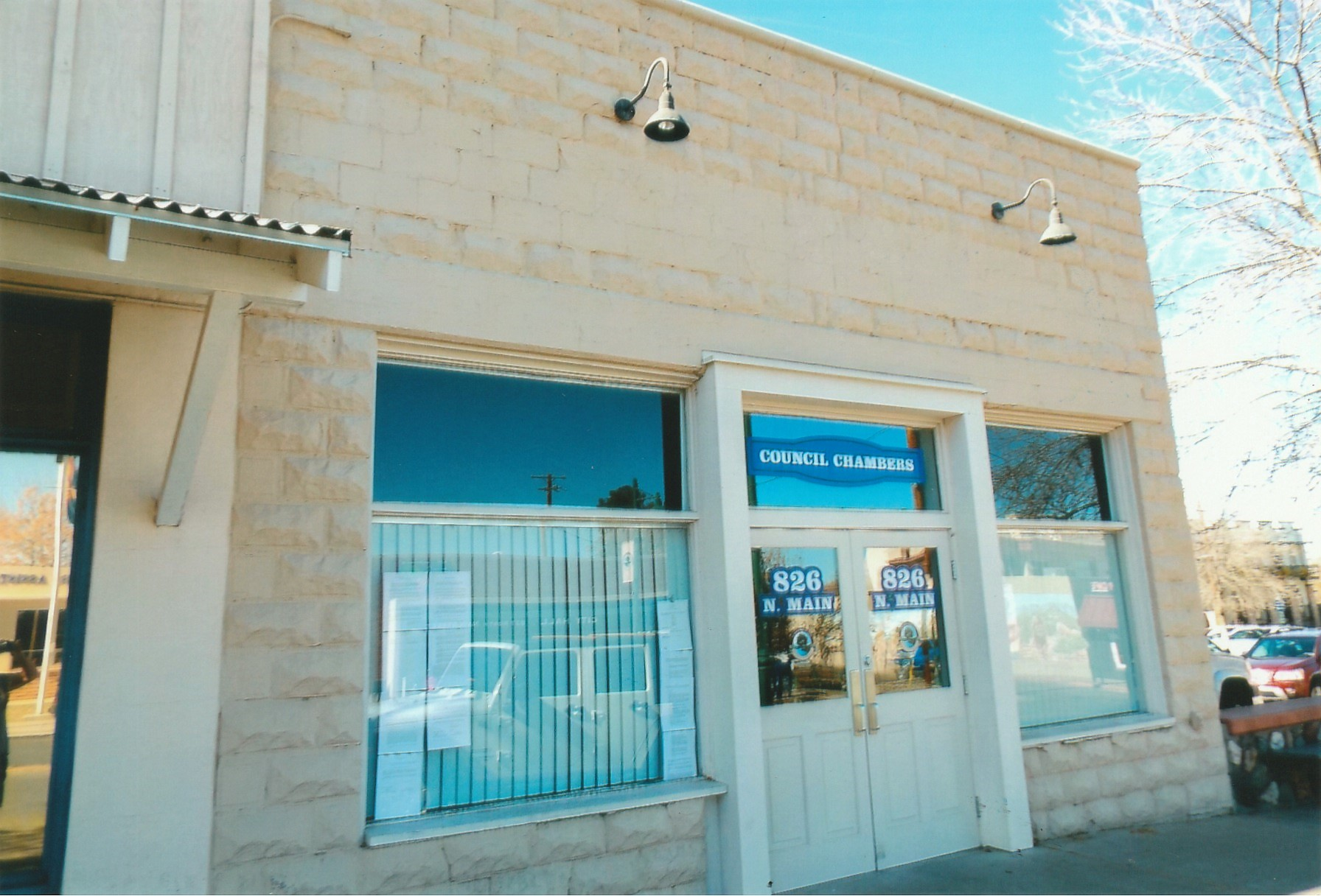
- Building on 826

- Location within Arizona Location within the United States
- Location: 826 N. Main St., Cottonwood, Arizona
- Coordinates: 34°44′46″N 112°1′36″W
- Area: less than one acre
- Built: 1925
- MPS: Cottonwood MRA
- NRHP reference No.: 86002147
- Added to NRHP: September 19, 1986

The Building at 826 North Main Street, at 826 N. Main St. in Cottonwood, Arizona, was built in 1925. It is a 25-by-75-foot (7.6 m × 22.9 m) building built of cast block and is significant of an example of better fire protection in construction following a 1925 fire in Cottonwood's business district. This building is reported to be one of only three examples of using cast block in particular, in Cottonwood, and "the only example of its use for residential purposes", although the building has in fact been used since for commercial purposes.

It was listed on the National Register of Historic Places in 1986.
