= Willard House (Cottonwood, Arizona) =

- U.S. National Register of Historic Places
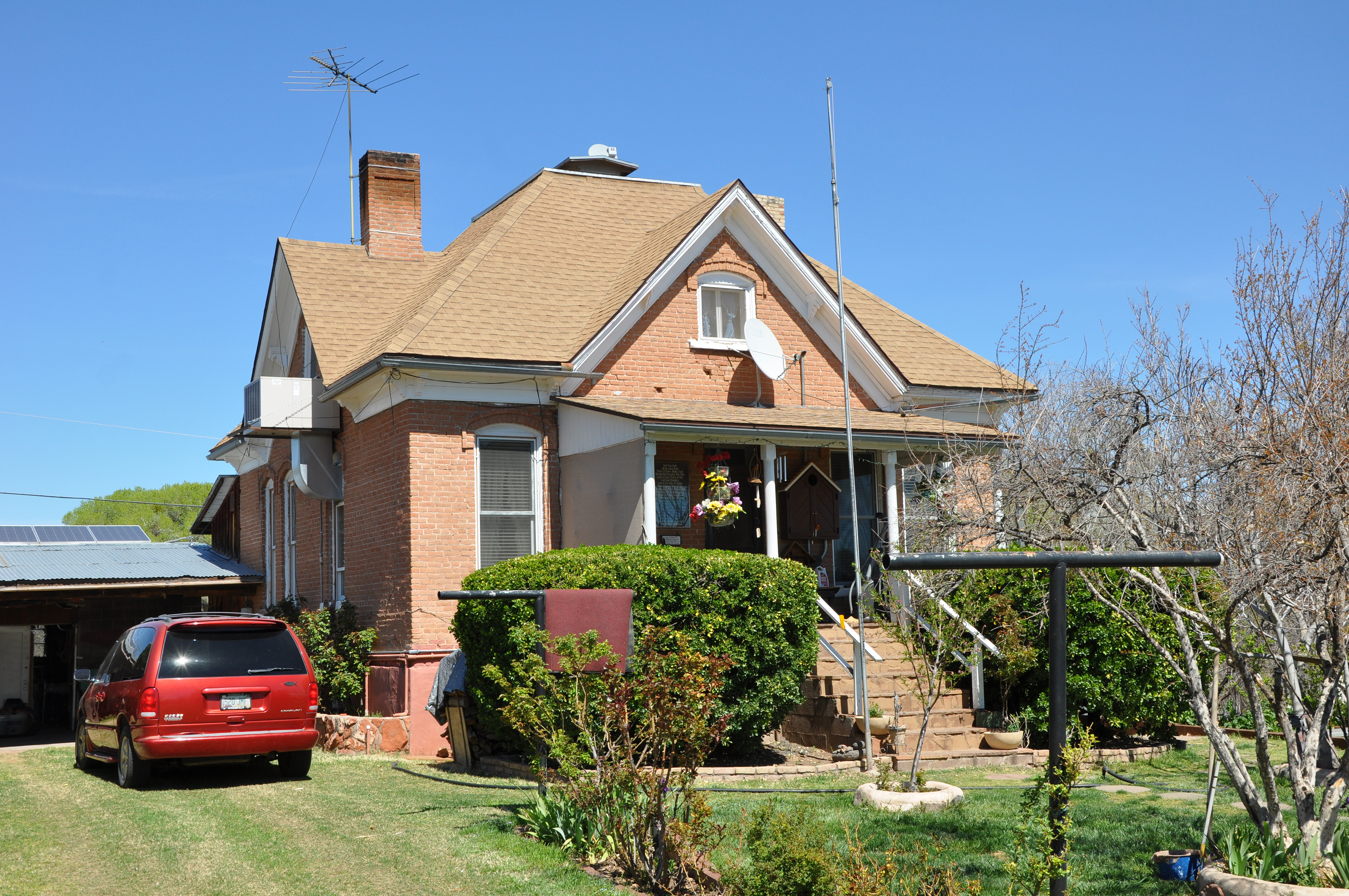

- Location within Arizona Location within the United States
- Location: 114 W. Main, Cottonwood, Arizona
- Coordinates: 34°45′01″N 112°01′43″W
- Area: less than one acre
- Built: 1886
- Built by: Willard, Mary Grace
- Architectural style: Queen Anne
- MPS: Cottonwood MRA
- NRHP reference No.: 86002166
- Added to NRHP: September 19, 1986

The Willard House at 114 N. Main in Cottonwood, Arizona is a historic house built in 1890 for Mary Grace Willard, an early settler who arrived in 1888 and homesteaded the land upon which the house sits. The house is unique as being built of brick and having Queen Anne style, at such an early time, and for a homestead house.
