= Alvie Self =

- Born: 1938 or 1939 (age 87–88); Cottonwood, Arizona, U.S.
- Origin: Verde Valley, Arizona, U.S.
- Genres: rock and roll; gospel; country
- Occupations: Singer; musician
- Instruments: Guitar; accordion
- Years active: 1960–present
- Labels: Don Ray; Ford

Alvie Self is an American singer and guitar player from the Verde Valley in Arizona. His contributions to rock and roll are recognized by the Rockabilly Hall of Fame. He has also been inducted into the Greater Arizona Country Music Association Hall of Fame and the Western Swing Music Association Hall of Fame.

Self's first recording was "Rain Dance." He is well known for several early recordings on Don Ray Records, such as "Let's Go Wild" and "Nancy."

== Biography ==
Alvie Self was born in Cottonwood, Arizona and grew up in the Verde Valley, singing country and gospel music. He played accordion before taking up the guitar. "I loved Buddy Holly and Ritchie Valens. I noticed the way people danced and reacted to it, and got this idea to go wild and dance to rock n’ roll." He recorded his first song, "Rain Dance," at VIV Studio in Phoenix, and was released on the local Ford label.

At 22, he traveled to Phoenix to meet Don Bennett, who had played with guitarist Al Casey and others in the Sunset Riders. He also co-wrote "Hey Little Freshman", a 1958 song by Ted Newman, which was covered in 1964 by Jan & Dean.

Most of his 1960s recordings were made in the Audio Recorders studio, accompanied by bandmates of guitarist Duane Eddy, including Casey. Backing vocals were added later, with contributions from local singers. Self recalled about this experience:

"I went right in there and, bang!, very few of them we had to take more than twice. I think we did ‘Young Singer’ on the first take." "There were a lot of people coming to that studio to record, and I mean lots of ‘em, women and men both, and they weren’t charging much of anything. It gave locals the opportunity to do something, and Bennett the chance to meet all these singers and artists."

From these recording sessions came songs such as "Let’s Go Wild," "Nancy," "Young Singer," "I See Your Love," "Lonely Walk," "Walking in the Spirit," and "Jesus Made the Greatest Chance." "Let's Go Wild" / "Nancy" was released as a single in 1960 on Bennett's Don Ray Records. It met with some success, and was played throughout the country. "Nancy" was covered by Dick Clark on American Bandstand.

He moved to Phoenix around 1965, operating road graders and dump trucks on weekdays, and playing on the weekends. After staying in Hollywood and recording country songs with Accent Records for a few years, he returned to Verde Valley where he has lived ever since. He continues to perform live at the M-Diamond Ranch in Sedona. "I’ve gotten to play for people from all over the world since I’ve been out there. It’s been a real blessing and great opportunity."
