= Frederick Lewis =

Frederick or Fred Lewis may refer to:

== Sportspeople ==
- Carl Lewis (Frederick Carlton Lewis, born 1961), American track athlete and Olympic medalist
- Fred Lewis (born 1980), American baseball player
- Fred Lewis (1880s outfielder) (1858–1945), 19th-century American baseball player
- Fred Lewis (basketball, born 1921) (1921–1994), college basketball coach
- Fred Lewis (footballer, born 1886) (1886–1949), English footballer for Stoke
- Fred Lewis (footballer, born 1923) (1923–1975), English footballer for Chelsea and Colchester United
- Fred Lewis (handballer) (born 1947), American handball player
- Freddie Lewis (born 1943), American basketball player who played in the National Basketball Association and American Basketball Association
- Frederick Pea (born 1969), American basketball player formerly known as Fred Lewis
- Jack Lewis (footballer, born 1948) (Frederick John Lewis), Wales under-23 international footballer

== Others ==
- Frederick, Prince of Wales (1707–1751), who was sometimes known by his full name Frederick Louis (or Lewis)
- Sir Frederick Orr-Lewis (1860–1921), Canadian businessman
- Fred E. Lewis (1865–1949), American politician
- Fred P. Lewis, American meteorologist
- Fred Lewis (naturalist) (1882–1956), Australian public servant and conservationist
- R. Fred Lewis (1947–2026), chief justice of the Florida Supreme Court
- Frederick M. Lewis, known for his contribution to the Mayo–Lewis equation in polymer chemistry
- Frederick Lewis, 1st Baron Essendon (1870–1944), British shipping magnate
- Frederick Christian Lewis (1779–1856), English etcher, engraver and painter
- Frederick William Lewis (died 1907), Canadian politician from Ontario
