= Cottonwood Airport =

Airport in Yavapai County, Arizona

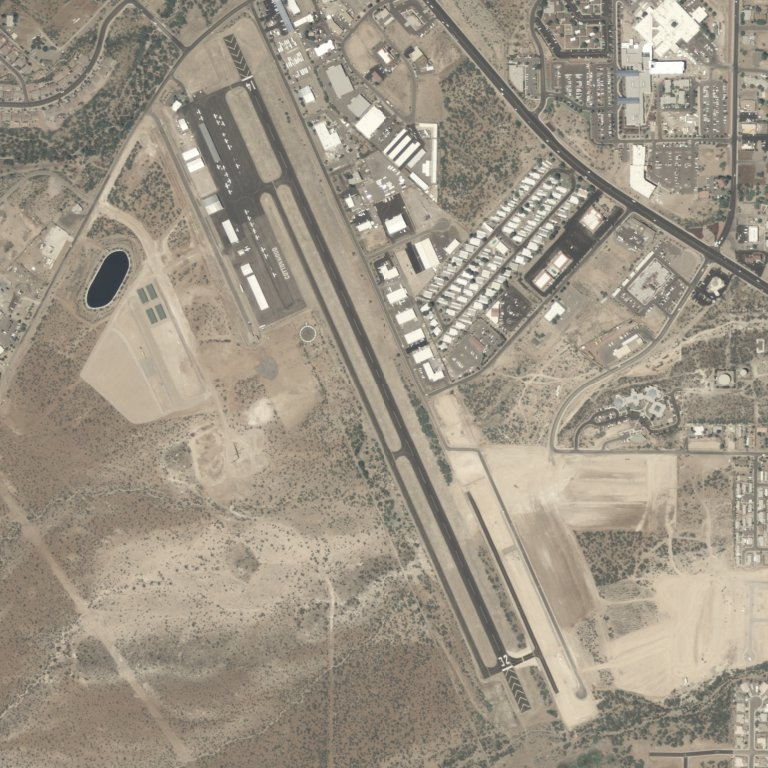
- IATA: CTW; ICAO: none; FAA LID: P52

Summary
- Airport type: Public
- Owner: City of Cottonwood
- Serves: Cottonwood, Arizona
- Elevation AMSL: 3,560 ft / 1,085 m
- Coordinates: 34°43′48″N 112°02′06″W

Map

Runways
Direction	Length		Surface
Direction	ft	m	Surface
14/32	4,252	1,296	Asphalt

Statistics (2015)
- Aircraft operations: 18,900
- Based aircraft: 13
- Source: Federal Aviation Administration

Cottonwood Airport (IATA: CTW, FAA LID: P52) is a city-owned, public-use non-towered airport located 1.15 miles (1.00 nmi; 1.85 km) southwest of the central business district of Cottonwood, a city in Yavapai County, Arizona, United States and 90 miles (78 nmi; 140 km) north of Phoenix Sky Harbor International Airport.

Although most U.S. airports use the same three-letter location identifier for the FAA and IATA, Cottonwood Airport is assigned P52 by the FAA and CTW by the IATA.

== History ==
Cottonwood Airport was originally opened as the Clemenceau Airport on April 20, 1929. with land leased from the United Verde Extension mining company.

William Andrews Clark, III, grandson of Senator William A. Clark, was heavily involved in plans for development of the airport. He was killed in an aviation accident on May 14, 1932; this ended the interest of Clark family and the United Verde Copper Company in further development of aviation.

The airport was further developed during the 1930s by the Civil Works Administration though temporarily closed in May 1940 as the original lease of the land expired. Shortly thereafter, on May 23, 1940, the land was deeded to Yavapai County for use as the Clemenceau airport.

During the Second World War, the Williams Flying School trained cadets for the Civilian Pilot Training Program at the Clemenceau Airport. The name of the airport was changed to Cottonwood Airport in a funding request sometime between 1945 and 1957.

== Facilities and aircraft ==
Cottonwood Airport covers an area of 210 acres (85 ha) at an elevation of 3,560 ft (1,090 m) above mean sea level. It has one runway:

- 14/32 measuring 4,252 ft × 75 ft (1,296 m × 23 m) asphalt

For the 12-month period ending April 23, 2015, the airport had 18,900 aircraft operations, an average of 51 per day: 98% general aviation, 1.75% air taxi, and .25% military. At that time there were 13 aircraft based at this airport: 73% single-engine, 2% ultralight, 15% multi-engine, no jet, and no helicopters.

== See also ==
- List of airports in Arizona
