= Fred P. Lewis =

American meteorologist

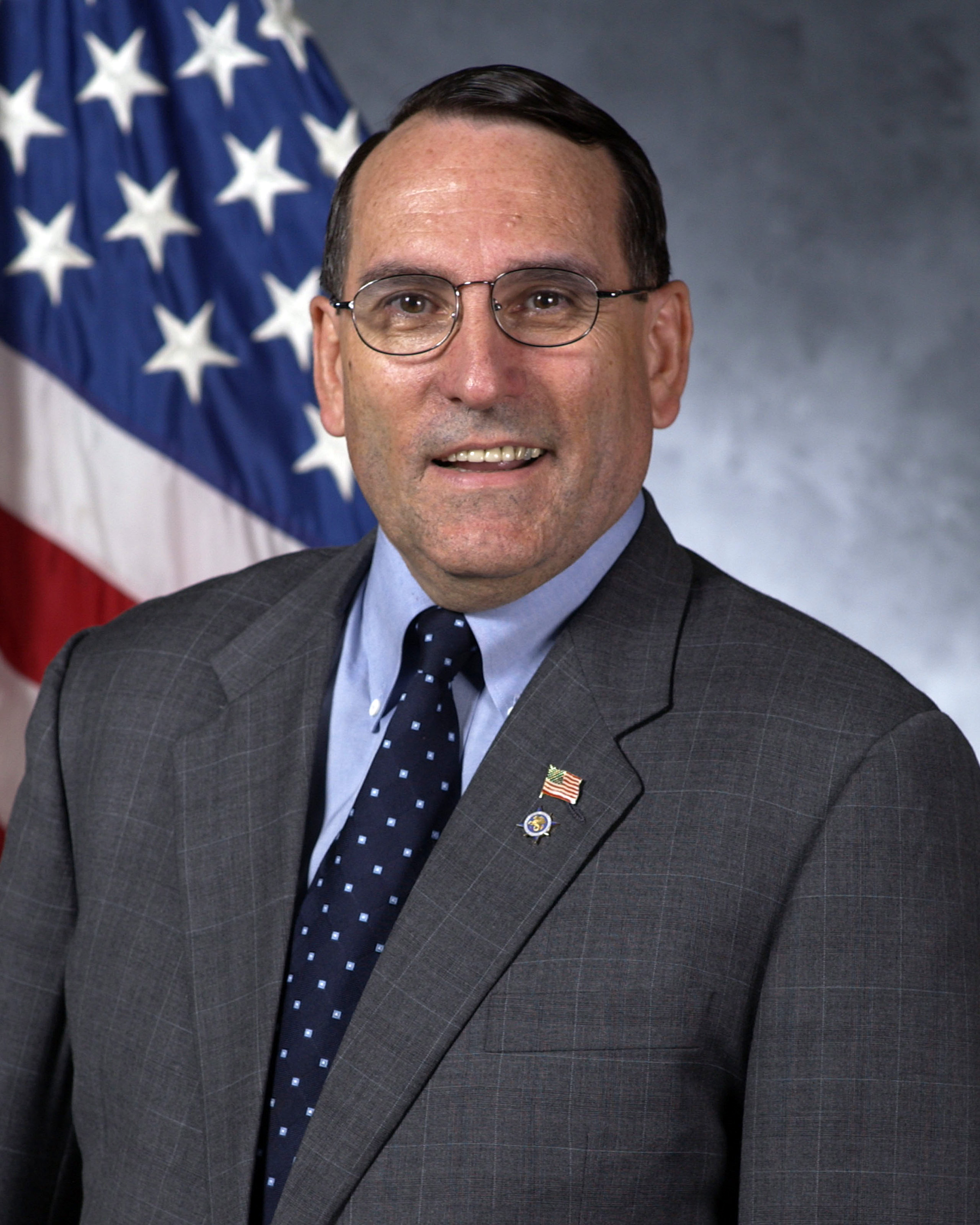
- Born: Cottonwood, Arizona
- Military career
- Allegiance: United States of America
- Branch: U.S. Air Force
- Rank: Brigadier General

Fred P. Lewis is the former the Director of Weather, Deputy Chief of Staff for Operations, Plans & Requirements, U.S. Air Force, Washington, D.C. Dr. Lewis develops doctrine, policy, requirements, and standards to organize, train, and equip the weather career field to support the Air Force, Army, designated unified/sub-unified commands, and the national intelligence community. He plans, programs, and budgets for vital weather resources; manages the $350 million per year weather program; directs the 1,400-person Air Force Weather (AFW) Field Operating Agency located at Offutt Air Force Base; and provides functional oversight of the 4,412-person AFW total force.

The general was born in Cottonwood, Ariz. He entered the Air Force through the Reserve Officer Training Corps program at the University of Arizona in 1972. He commanded a weather squadron and computer systems group besides serving in many weather and joint staff officer assignments. In December 1985 he became the first Air Force weather officer selected for Space Shuttle duty, but never flew due to the Challenger disaster. Prior to his current assignment, the general was director of the Joint Transportation Corporate Information Management Center at U.S. Transportation Command. His unit was responsible for improving the efficiency and effectiveness of the defense transportation system by using process improvement techniques and enhancing automated systems capabilities.

When Dr. Lewis was previously assigned as the Director of Weather, he led efforts to implement a total force transformation of the Air Force's weather functional area to significantly improve weather support for operators worldwide. He retired from the Air Force in 2000 in the rank of brigadier general. Prior to assuming his current position, Dr. Lewis was deputy director of Distribution Portfolio Management, Command, Control, Communications and Computer Systems Directorate, U.S. Transportation Command, Scott Air Force Base, Ill.
