= Cottonwood, Arizona =

City in the United States

Cottonwood
- City
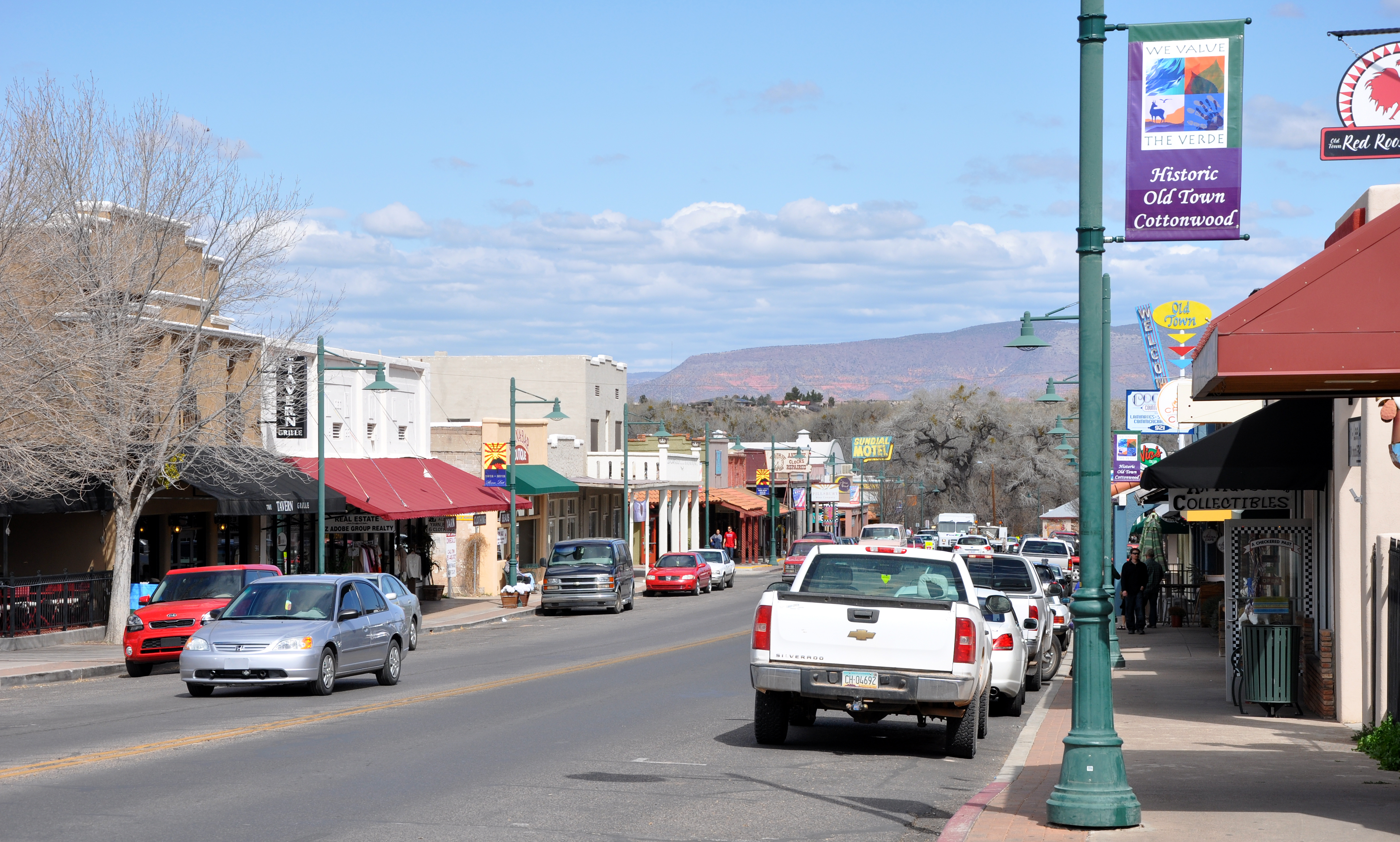
- "Old Town" Historic District

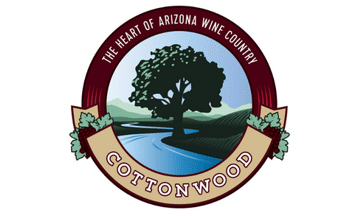
- Flag
- Motto: "The Heart of Arizona Wine Country" "Inspiring a Vibrant Community"
- Location of Cottonwood in Yavapai County, Arizona

- Location in Arizona Cottonwood (the United States)
- Coordinates: 34°43′56″N 112°01′07″W
- Country: United States
- State: Arizona
- County: Yavapai
- Established: 1960
- Named after: Cottonwood Tree

Government
  - Type: Council-Manager
  - Body: Cottonwood City Council (6 members plus Mayor)
  - Mayor: Ann Shaw

Area
  - Total: 16.61 sq mi (43.03 km^{2})
  - Land: 16.61 sq mi (43.03 km^{2})
  - Water: 0 sq mi (0.00 km^{2})
- Elevation: 3,461 ft (1,055 m)

Population (2020)
  - Total: 12,029
  - Density: 724.1/sq mi (279.56/km^{2})
- Time zone: UTC-7 (MST)
- ZIP code: 86326
- Area code: 928
- FIPS code: 04-16410
- GNIS ID: 2410242
- Website: City of Cottonwood

Cottonwood is a city in Yavapai County, Arizona, United States. As of the 2020 census, Cottonwood had a population of 12,029. It is located on the Verde River.

== History ==
As settlers arrived in the area, an abundance of cottonwood trees near the Verde River served as a meeting place for travelers. Horses rested there before their journey up the mountains, and travellers would camp here. This location would become the center of Cottonwood. A post office was established in 1885. Main Street in Cottonwood was created 1908, when two settlers "used a mule team to pull and drag through brush". In 1917, Clemenceau, a mining town that is now part of Cottonwood, was established nearby. The Clemenceau smelter closed in 1936, causing job loses and a disruption to the area. Cottonwood incorporated in 1960.

== Geography ==
According to the United States Census Bureau, the city has a total area of 10.7 square miles (28 km^{2}), all land.

=== Climate ===
Cottonwood has a cool semi-arid climate (Köppen BSk) almost warm enough to be a hot semi-arid climate (BSh). In January the average high temperature is 61 °F (16.1 °C) with a low of 26 °F (−3.3 °C). In July the average high temperature is 101 °F (38.3 °C) with a low of 67 °F (19 °C). Annual rainfall is approximately 12 inches or 300 millimeters, with a range from 3.25 inches or 82.6 millimeters in the "rain year" from July 2020 to June 2021, up to as much as 22.15 inches or 562.6 millimeters between July 1972 and June 1973, and 26.07 inches or 662.2 millimeters in calendar year 1965. The wettest single month has been October 1972 with 7.34 inches or 186.4 millimeters, and the wettest single day September 17, 1925 with 3.54 inches or 89.9 millimeters.

Snowfall is rare, with a 1991 to 2020 median of a trace and mean of 1.0 inch or 0.025 meters; the most snow in one month has been 45.5 inches or 1.2 meters in December 1967, but no other month has had more than 11 inches or 0.28 meters. Frosts, however, are common: an average of 67 mornings fall below freezing each winter, although only three afternoons – January 20, 1935, January 6, 1971 and December 31, 2010 – have ever failed to top freezing. The lowest temperature ever record has been 5 °F or −15 °C on January 13, 1963. Summer expects 126 afternoons at or above 90 °F (32.2 °C) and 42 at or above 100 °F (37.8 °C); the hottest temperature recorded is 118 °F (47.8 °C) on June 26, 1994.

Climate data for Cottonwood, Arizona (Tuzigoot, 1991–2020 normals, extremes 1920–present)
Month	Jan	Feb	Mar	Apr	May	Jun	Jul	Aug	Sep	Oct	Nov	Dec	Year
Record high °F (°C)	80 (27)	87 (31)	99 (37)	98 (37)	107 (42)	118 (48)	116 (47)	117 (47)	113 (45)	104 (40)	91 (33)	79 (26)	118 (48)
Mean maximum °F (°C)	71.5 (21.9)	74.9 (23.8)	82.5 (28.1)	91.3 (32.9)	99.5 (37.5)	108.1 (42.3)	109.9 (43.3)	106.7 (41.5)	100.8 (38.2)	92.5 (33.6)	81.8 (27.7)	71.3 (21.8)	111.3 (44.1)
Mean daily maximum °F (°C)	60.9 (16.1)	64.5 (18.1)	71.2 (21.8)	78.9 (26.1)	87.9 (31.1)	98.9 (37.2)	101.1 (38.4)	98.4 (36.9)	93.1 (33.9)	82.6 (28.1)	70.5 (21.4)	59.8 (15.4)	80.6 (27.0)
Daily mean °F (°C)	45.3 (7.4)	48.6 (9.2)	54.4 (12.4)	61.0 (16.1)	69.4 (20.8)	79.1 (26.2)	83.9 (28.8)	82.0 (27.8)	75.7 (24.3)	64.7 (18.2)	53.3 (11.8)	44.6 (7.0)	63.5 (17.5)
Mean daily minimum °F (°C)	29.8 (−1.2)	32.7 (0.4)	37.6 (3.1)	43.0 (6.1)	50.8 (10.4)	59.3 (15.2)	66.8 (19.3)	65.5 (18.6)	58.4 (14.7)	46.7 (8.2)	36.0 (2.2)	29.4 (−1.4)	46.3 (7.9)
Mean minimum °F (°C)	20.9 (−6.2)	23.2 (−4.9)	28.4 (−2.0)	33.6 (0.9)	40.1 (4.5)	49.6 (9.8)	59.3 (15.2)	59.1 (15.1)	49.0 (9.4)	36.0 (2.2)	25.2 (−3.8)	20.1 (−6.6)	17.8 (−7.9)
Record low °F (°C)	5 (−15)	6 (−14)	14 (−10)	24 (−4)	29 (−2)	40 (4)	52 (11)	46 (8)	41 (5)	21 (−6)	8 (−13)	8 (−13)	5 (−15)
Average rainfall inches (mm)	1.10 (28)	0.99 (25)	1.01 (26)	0.43 (11)	0.42 (11)	0.18 (4.6)	1.64 (42)	2.15 (55)	1.30 (33)	0.96 (24)	0.70 (18)	1.12 (28)	12.00 (305)
Average rainy days (≥ 0.01 inch)	4.6	5.2	4.7	2.7	2.5	1.3	7.5	8.4	4.9	3.6	3.1	4.4	52.9
Source: National Oceanic and Atmospheric Administration

== Demographics ==
Historical population
Census	Pop.	Note	%±
1950	1,626		—
1960	1,879		15.6%
1970	2,610		38.9%
1980	4,550		74.3%
1990	5,918		30.1%
2000	9,179		55.1%
2010	11,265		22.7%
2020	12,029		6.8%
U.S. Decennial Census

=== 2020 census ===
As of the 2020 census, Cottonwood had a population of 12,029. The median age was 52.4 years. 17.2% of residents were under the age of 18 and 32.6% of residents were 65 years of age or older. For every 100 females there were 85.7 males, and for every 100 females age 18 and over there were 82.7 males age 18 and over.

98.5% of residents lived in urban areas, while 1.5% lived in rural areas.

There were 5,696 households in Cottonwood, of which 19.2% had children under the age of 18 living in them. Of all households, 34.6% were married-couple households, 20.2% were households with a male householder and no spouse or partner present, and 37.1% were households with a female householder and no spouse or partner present. About 40.4% of all households were made up of individuals and 24.7% had someone living alone who was 65 years of age or older.

There were 6,174 housing units, of which 7.7% were vacant. The homeowner vacancy rate was 2.5% and the rental vacancy rate was 5.7%.

Racial composition as of the 2020 census
Race	Number	Percent
White	9,313	77.4%
Black or African American	85	0.7%
American Indian and Alaska Native	162	1.3%
Asian	110	0.9%
Native Hawaiian and Other Pacific Islander	20	0.2%
Some other race	965	8.0%
Two or more races	1,374	11.4%
Hispanic or Latino (of any race)	2,717	22.6%

=== 2000 census ===
At the 2000 census there were 9,179 people, 3,983 households and 2,369 families in the city. The population density was 860.3 inhabitants per square mile (332.2/km^{2}). There were 4,427 housing units at an average density of 414.9 per square mile (160.2/km^{2}). The racial makeup of the city was 85.2% White, 0.5% Black or African American, 1.6% Native American, 0.4% Asian, <0.1% Pacific Islander, 9.7% from other races, and 2.6% from two or more races. 20.5% of the population were Hispanic or Latino of any race. Of the 3,983 households 25.3% had children under the age of 18 living with them, 44.5% were married couples living together, 10.8% had a female as Head of Household with no Husband present, and 40.5% were non-families. 34.4% of households were one person and 19.1% were one person aged 65 or older. The average household size was 2.27 and the average family size was 2.90.

The age distribution was 23.4% under the age of 18, 8.2% from 18 to 24, 23.3% from 25 to 44, 21.4% from 45 to 64, and 23.8% 65 or older. The median age was 41 years. For every 100 females, there were 86.9 males. For every 100 females age 18 and over, there were 81.4 males.

The median household income was $27,444 and the median family income was $37,794. Males had a median income of $24,308 versus $19,977 for females. The per capita income for the city was $17,518. About 8.9% of families and 13.5% of the population were below the poverty line, including 19.5% of those under age 18 and 11.3% of those age 65 or over.

=== Civil unions ===
The city became one of the Arizona municipalities to approve of civil unions for same-sex partners.

== Arts and culture ==
The Cottonwood Public Library is part of the Yavapai County Library Network and serves the city of Cottonwood along with surrounding cities including Clarkdale, Camp Verde, Jerome, Rimrock and unincorporated areas of the Verde Valley in Yavapai County.

The Verde Valley Fairgrounds host the annual Verde Valley Fair in Cottonwood.

== Education ==
Cottonwood-Oak Creek School District operates public schools.

== Infrastructure ==
The city is served by Cottonwood Airport, a general aviation facility. It also has a public transit system, Cottonwood Area Transit (CAT), which operates in Cottonwood, Clarkdale and Verde Village. CAT also operates the Vedre Shuttle, which connects Cottonwood with Sedona. The Town of Jerome runs a shuttle between the towns on Wednesdays.

== Notable people ==
- Frederick Henry Ball – American movie studio executive and younger brother of Lucille Ball.
- Junior Brown – country singer and guitarist
- Ambyr Childers – actress
- Fred P. Lewis – U.S. Air Force; born in Cottonwood
- Ray Manley – photographer
- June Miller – Second wife of writer Henry Miller
- John Pedersen – arms designer, known for the Pedersen device
- Alvie Self – singer, member of Rockabilly Hall of Fame
- Max Terhune – actor (1891–1973)

== See also ==
- List of historic properties in Cottonwood, Arizona
