= List of Arizona railroads =

The following railroads operate in the U.S. state of Arizona.

== Class I Railroads ==
- BNSF Railway (BNSF)
- Union Pacific Railroad (UP)

== Shortline and Terminal Railroads ==
- Apache Railway (APA)
- Arizona and California Railroad (ARZC)
- Arizona Central Railroad (AZCR)
- Arizona Eastern Railway (AZER)
- Copper Basin Railway (CBRY)
- Port of Tucson Railroad (POT)
- Kingman Terminal Railroad (KGTR)
- San Manuel Arizona Railroad (SMA)
- San Pedro Valley Railroad (SPVR)
- Sonoran Valley Railroad (SVR)

== Passenger Railroads ==
- Amtrak (AMTK): Southwest Chief, Sunset Limited, Texas Eagle
- Valley Metro Rail & Streetcar
- Sun Link
- Old Pueblo Trolley

== Heritage and Scenic Railroads ==
- Grand Canyon Railway (GCRY)
- Old Pueblo Trolley
- Verde Canyon Railroad

== Industrial Rail Operations ==
- Camp Navajo Railroad
- Drake Switching Company
- Freeport McMoRan Railroad

== Defunct railroads ==
Name	Mark	System (Note: This is one or more of the Class I railroads that the railroad became part of, if any.)	From	To	Successor	Notes
Arizona and California Railway		ATSF	1903	1911	California, Arizona and Santa Fe Railway	
Arizona and Colorado Railroad		SP	1902	1910	Arizona Eastern Railroad	
Arizona Eastern Railroad	AE		1904	1955	Southern Pacific Company	
Arizona Extension Railroad			1917		N/A	
Arizona Mineral Belt Railroad			1883	1888	Central Arizona Railway	
Arizona Narrow Gauge Railroad			1882	1887	Tucson, Globe and Northern Railroad	
Arizona and New Mexico Railway		SP	1883	1935	El Paso and Southwestern Railroad	
Arizona and South Eastern Railroad		SP	1888	1902	El Paso and Southwestern Railroad	
Arizona Southern Railroad	AZS		1904	1933	N/A	
Arizona and Swansea Railroad			1909	1931	N/A	
Atchison, Topeka and Santa Fe Railway	ATSF	ATSF	1902	1996	Burlington Northern and Santa Fe Railway	
Atlantic and Pacific Railroad		ATSF	1866	1897	Santa Fe Pacific Railroad	
Arizona and Utah Railway		ATSF	1899	1905	Western Arizona Railway	
Black Mesa and Lake Powell Railroad	BLKM		1973	2019	N/A	
Bradshaw Mountain Railroad		ATSF	1901	1912	California, Arizona and Santa Fe Railway	
California, Arizona and Santa Fe Railway		ATSF	1911	1963	Atchison, Topeka and Santa Fe Railway	
Central Arizona Railway			1889	1937	N/A	
Clifton and Southern Pacific Railway		SP	1883	1883	Arizona and New Mexico Railway	
Dragoon Mountain and Northern Railroad		SP	1906	1907	Johnson, Dragoon Mountain and Northern Railway	
El Paso and Southwestern Company		SP	1908	1912	N/A	Leased the El Paso and Southwestern Railroad
El Paso and Southwestern Railroad		SP	1901	1955	Southern Pacific Company	
Gila Valley, Globe and Northern Railway		SP	1894	1910	Arizona Eastern Railroad	
Grand Canyon Railway		ATSF	1901	1942	Atchison, Topeka and Santa Fe Railway	
Johnson, Dragoon Mountain and Northern Railway		SP	1907	1908	Johnson–Dragoon and Northern Railway	
Johnson–Dragoon and Northern Railway		SP	1908	1911	Southern Pacific Company	
Magma Arizona Railroad	MAA		1914	1997	N/A	
Maricopa and Phoenix Railroad		SP	1907	1910	Arizona Eastern Railroad	
Maricopa and Phoenix Railroad		SP	1885	1895	Maricopa and Phoenix and Salt River Valley Railroad	
Maricopa and Phoenix and Salt River Valley Railroad		SP	1895	1907	Maricopa and Phoenix Railroad	
Mascot and Western Railroad	MASW		1914	1932	N/A	
Mexico and Colorado Railroad		SP	1908	1910	El Paso and Southwestern Railroad	
Mohave and Milltown Railway			1903	1904	N/A	
Morenci Southern Railway		SP	1899	1922	Morenci Industrial Railway	
New Mexico and Arizona Railroad		SP	1882	1934	Southern Pacific Railroad	
Phoenix and Buckeye Railway		SP	1909	1910	Arizona Eastern Railroad	
Phoenix and Eastern Railroad		SP	1901	1934	Southern Pacific Company	
Phoenix, Tempe and Mesa Railway		SP	1894	1895	Maricopa and Phoenix and Salt River Valley Railroad	
Prescott and Arizona Central Railway			1885	1893	N/A	
Prescott and Eastern Railroad		ATSF	1897	1911	California, Arizona and Santa Fe Railway	
Ray and Gila Valley Railroad	R&GV		1910	1943	Copper Basin Railway	
Saginaw Southern Railroad			1898	1903	N/A	
San Manuel Arizona Railroad	SMA		1953	2003	N/A	
San Pedro and Southwestern Railway	SWKR		1992	2003	San Pedro and Southwestern Railroad	
Santa Fe and Grand Canyon Railroad		ATSF	1897	1901	Grand Canyon Railway	
Santa Fe Pacific Railroad		ATSF	1897	1902	Atchison, Topeka and Santa Fe Railway	
Santa Fe, Prescott and Phoenix Railway		ATSF	1891	1911	California, Arizona and Santa Fe Railway	
Shannon–Arizona Railway			1909	1919	Morenci Industrial Railway	
Southern Pacific Railroad		SP	1878	1955	Southern Pacific Company	
Southern Pacific Company	SP	SP	1885	1969	Southern Pacific Transportation Company	
Southern Pacific Transportation Company	SP	SP	1969	1998	Union Pacific Railroad	
Southwestern Railroad of Arizona		SP	1900	1901	El Paso and Southwestern Railroad	
Tucson, Cornelia and Gila Bend Railroad	TC&G, TCG		1915	1985	N/A	
Tucson, Globe and Northern Railroad			1887		N/A	Never opened
Tucson and Nogales Railroad		SP	1909	1934	Southern Pacific Railroad	
Twin Buttes Railroad			1904	1929	N/A	
United Verde & Pacific Railway			1894	1920	N/A	
Verde Tunnel and Smelter Railroad			1912	1953	N/A	
Verde Valley Railway		ATSF	1911	1942	Atchison, Topeka and Santa Fe Railway	
Western Arizona Railway		ATSF	1906	1931	N/A	
Yuma Valley Railroad		SP	1914			

Private freight carriers

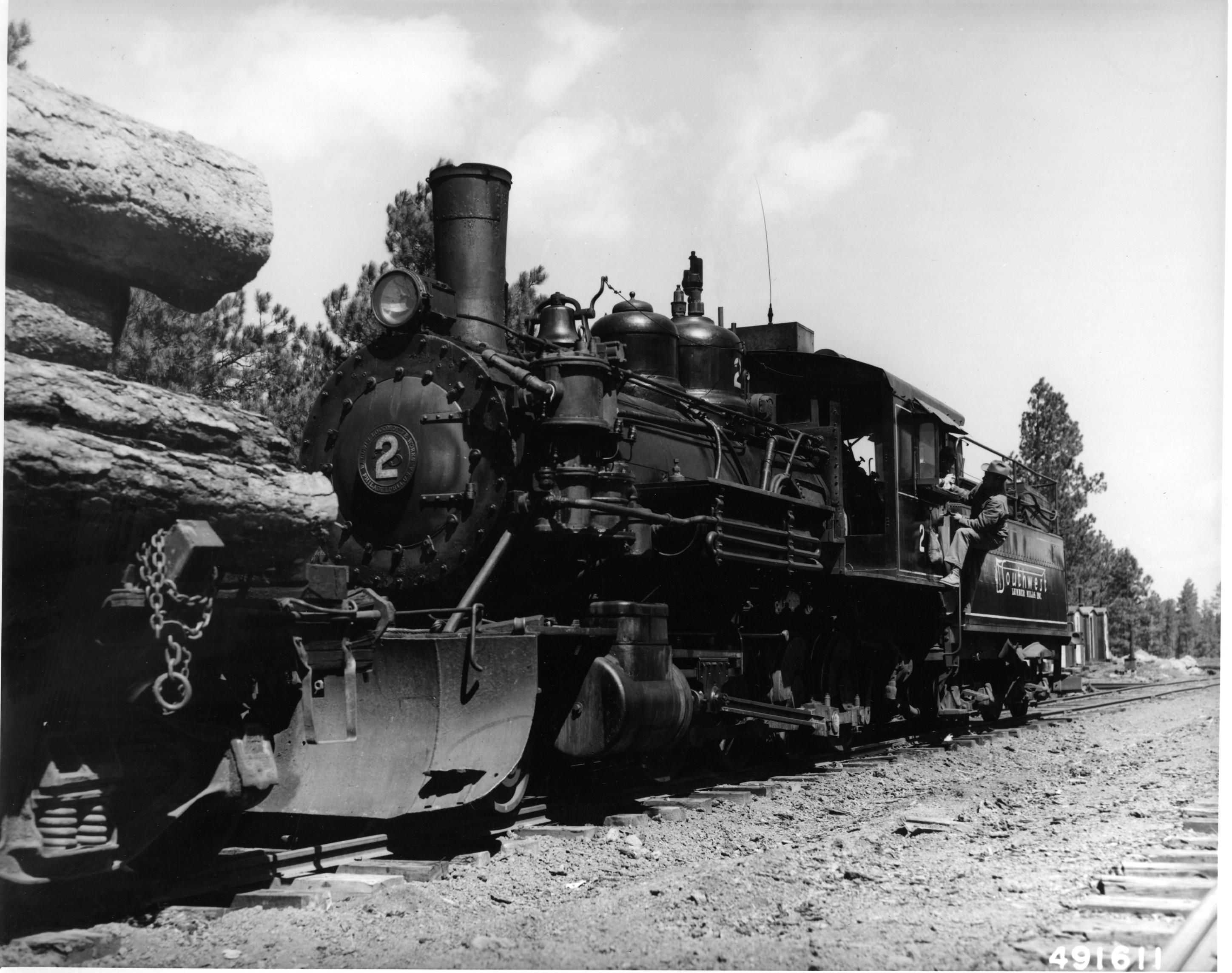
A Southwest Lumber Mills locomotive in 1959. A similar unit is on display in downtown Flagstaff.

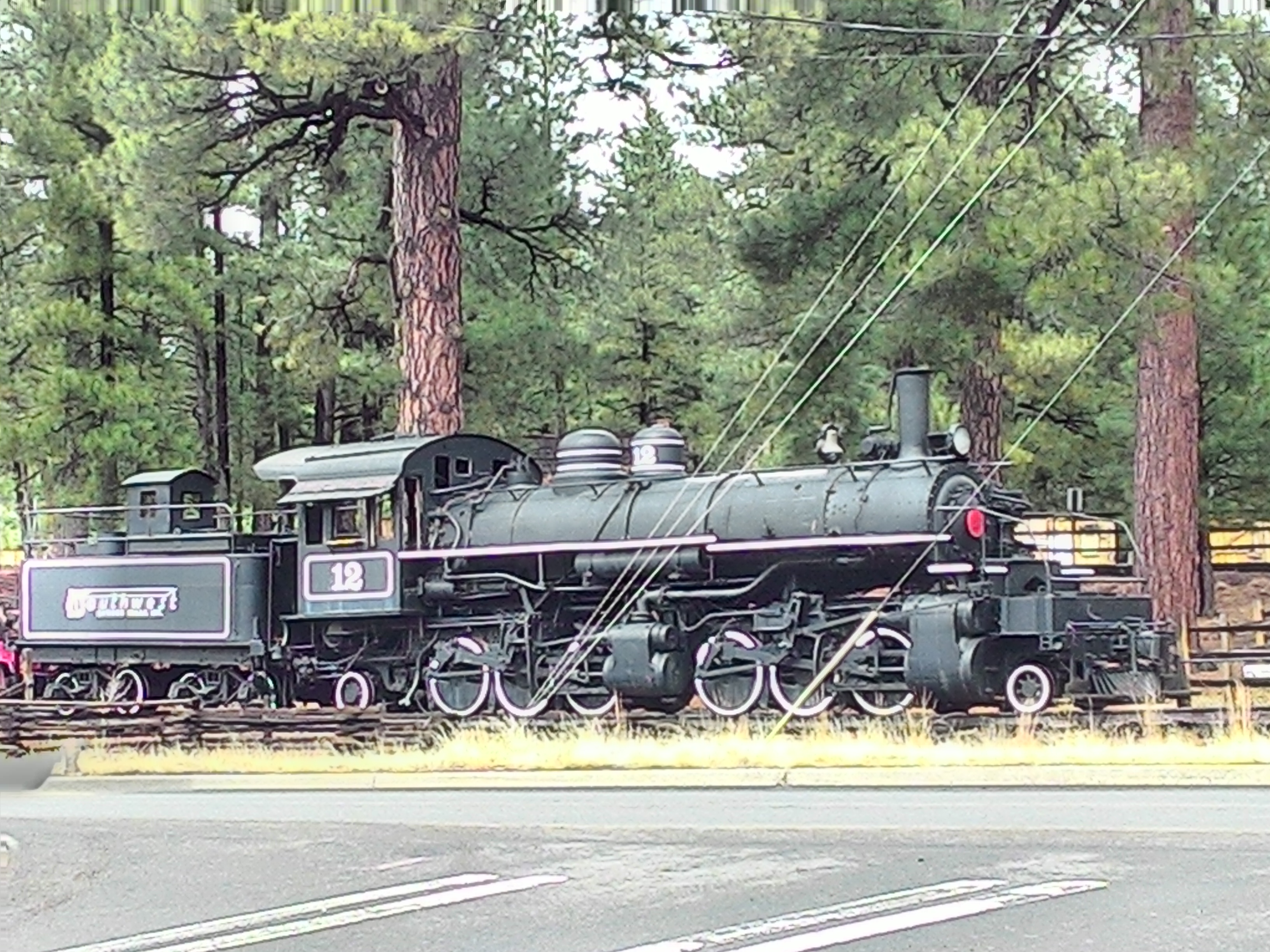
Southwest Lumber Mills locomotive on display in Flagstaff, Arizona in 2020

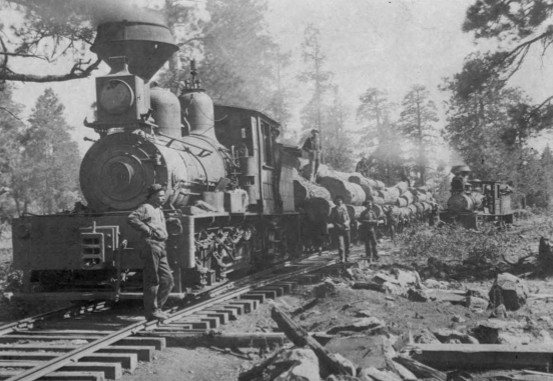
Saginaw and Manistee Lumber Company log train in the Kaibab National Forest, circa 1900.

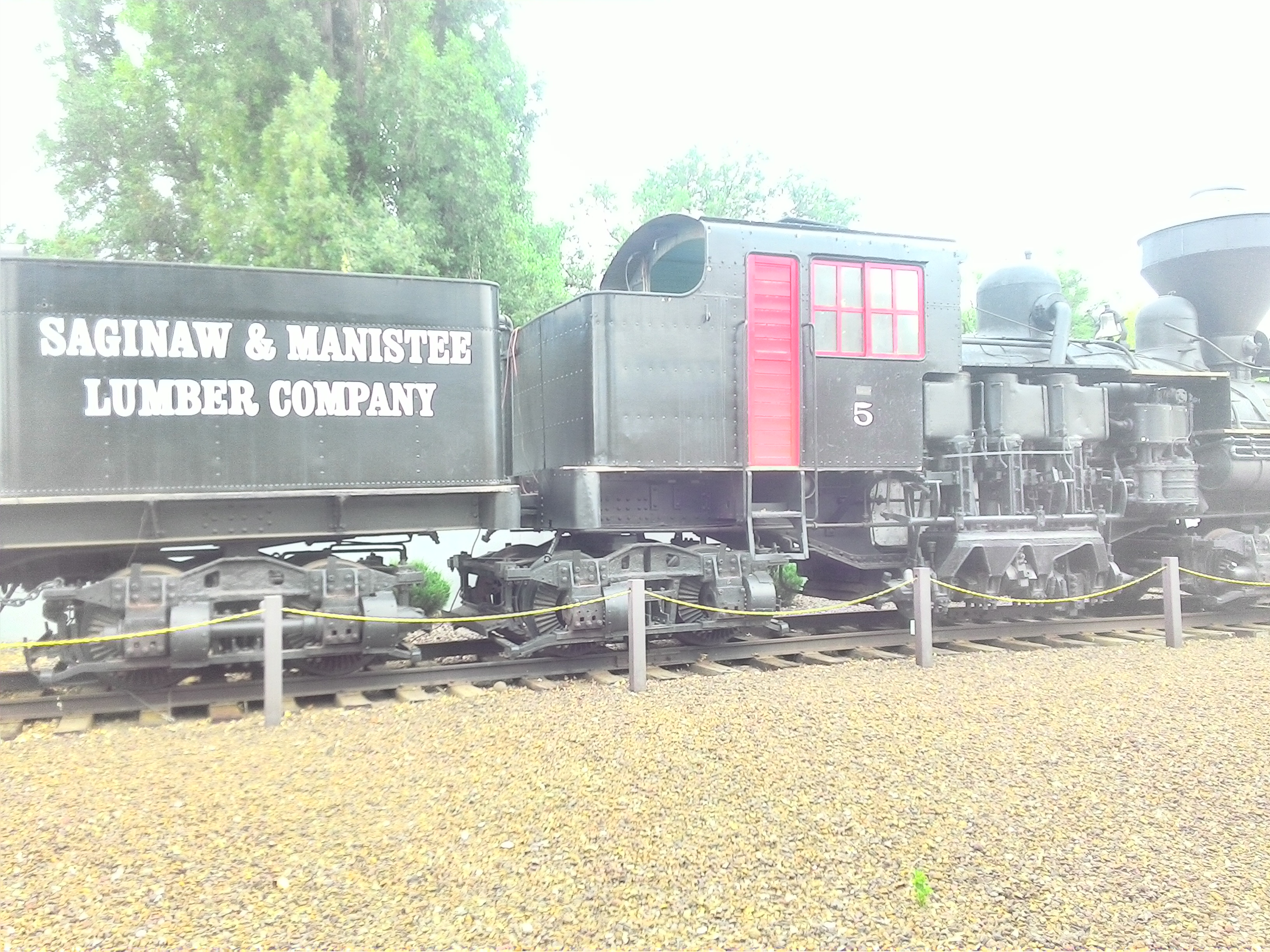
Sagniaw and Manistee Lumber Company locomotive on display in 2020

- Apache Lumber Company
- Arizona Lumber and Timber Company
- Cady Lumber Company
- Congress Gold Company
- Coronado Railroad
- Flagstaff Lumber Manufacturing Company
- Helvetia Copper Company
- Kennecott Copper Corporation
- Morenci Industrial Railway
- Saginaw and Manistee Lumber Company
- Six Companies, Inc.
- Southwest Forest Industries
- Southwest Lumber Mills, Inc.
- Tombstone and Southern Railroad

Passenger carriers

- White Mountain Scenic Railroad
- Yuma Valley Railway

Electric

- Douglas Street Railway
- Douglas Traction and Light Company
- Phoenix Railway
- Phoenix Railway of Arizona
- Phoenix Street Railway
- Prescott and Mount Union Railway
- Tucson Rapid Transit Company
- Tucson Street Railway
- Warren Company
- Warren–Bisbee Railway

== See also ==
- Passenger train stations in Arizona
