= Benson Railroad Historic District =

- U.S. National Register of Historic Places
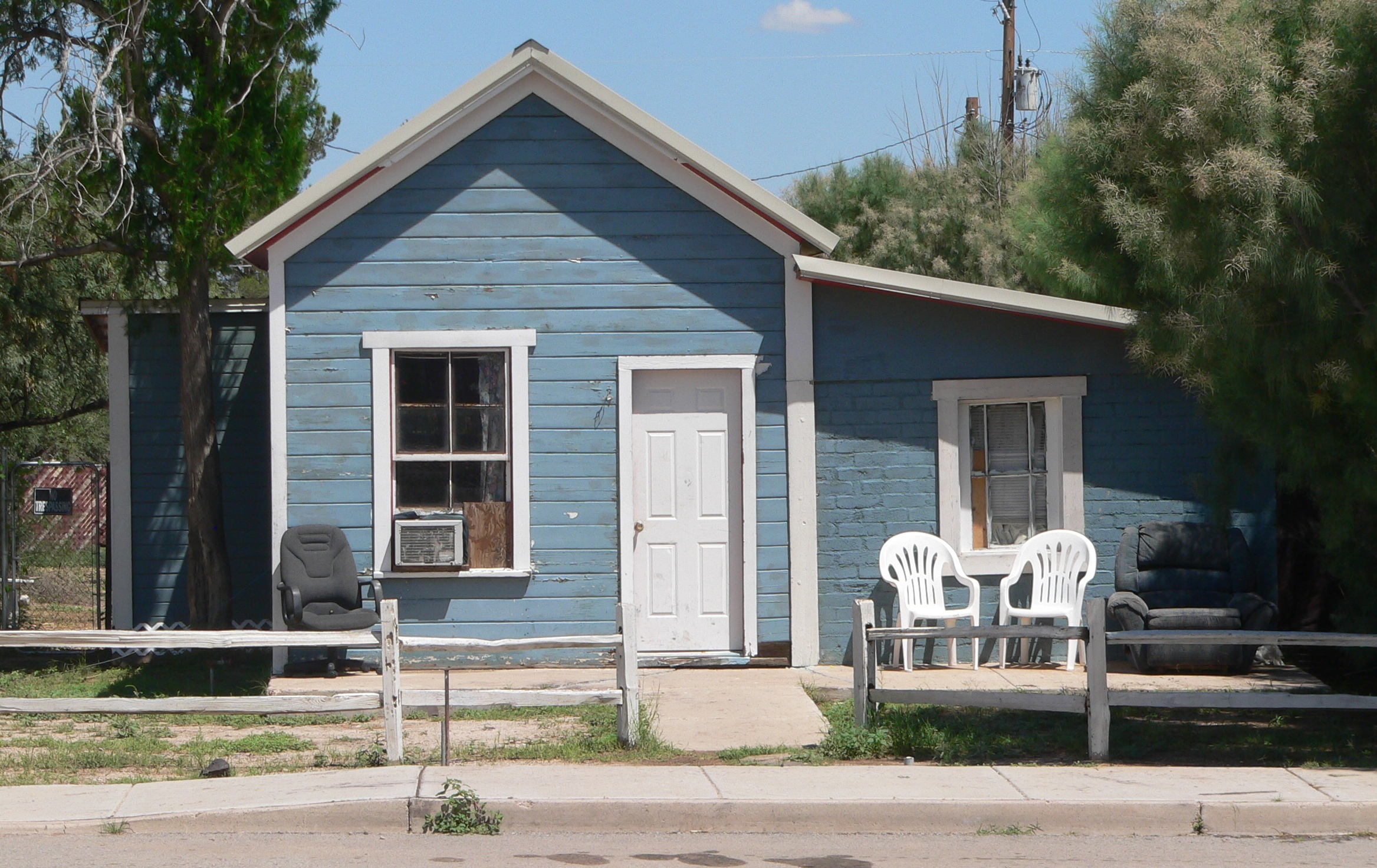
- 223 East 3rd Street

- Location within Arizona Location within the United States
- Location: Benson, Arizona
- Coordinates: 31°58′10″N 110°17′41″W
- NRHP reference No.: 94000079
- Added to NRHP: March 11, 1994

The Benson Railroad Historic District is an area of Benson, Arizona, located near the site of a former passenger and freight depot. The area contains 16 structures, 11 buildings and 5 outbuildings, although the outbuildings are not considered contributing structures to the historic district.

== History ==
Benson developed as a hub for three major railroads. This railroad era lasted from 1880 until 1910, and influenced Benson's architectural landscape for decades. The first railroad to arrive was the Southern Pacific in 1880, which led to the creation of Benson, which had been a stagecoach station, Ohnesorgen Stage Station. Since it was the only town in the area with a transcontinental connection, it grew rapidly. Benson served as the transportation hub for southeastern Arizona, where train passengers could take stagecoaches to the other towns in the region, such as Tombstone. It also served as the departing hub for the mineral products being produced in various mining districts near Clifton and Bisbee, and in the Galiuro and Rincon Mountains. When the New Mexico and Arizona Railroad arrived in 1882, and the Arizona Southeastern Railroad Company in 1894, Benson became a "hub city" The Arizona Southeastern, owned by the Copper Queen Consolidated Mining Company in Bisbee, was built to ship the company's ore to Benson for shipment elsewhere. In 1894 Benson was the only point in Arizona which was served by three independent railroad lines.

This railroad traffic created many commercial needs: hotels, saloons, restaurants, stores, and housing for the workers. The population grew from 300 in 1880 to 1,200 in 1910. The buildings in Benson which were related to the railroad were the station, the Wells Fargo express office. Directly north of the station were housing for railroad personnel, and a hotel. In 1901 the Arizona Southeastern Railroad Company rerouted its traffic, bypassing Benson. Nine years later, in 1910, the Southern Pacific opened a direct line from Tucson to Nogales, also bypassing Benson. This left the town with only a single line running, which negatively impacted the economy of the town.

== Description of Site ==
The district includes 16 buildings, 11 of which contribute to the district. The other five our noncontributing outbuildings. 3rd Street acts as its southern border, while North Huachuca is its western border and an alley constitutes its border to the north. Ten of the buildings are found on this block. The eastern side goes just past North San Pedro Street, where the eleventh structure stands. Five of the houses are vernacular frame, one is vernacular adobe, three are Colonial Revival buildings, one Queen Anne, one commercial building.

=== The architecture ===
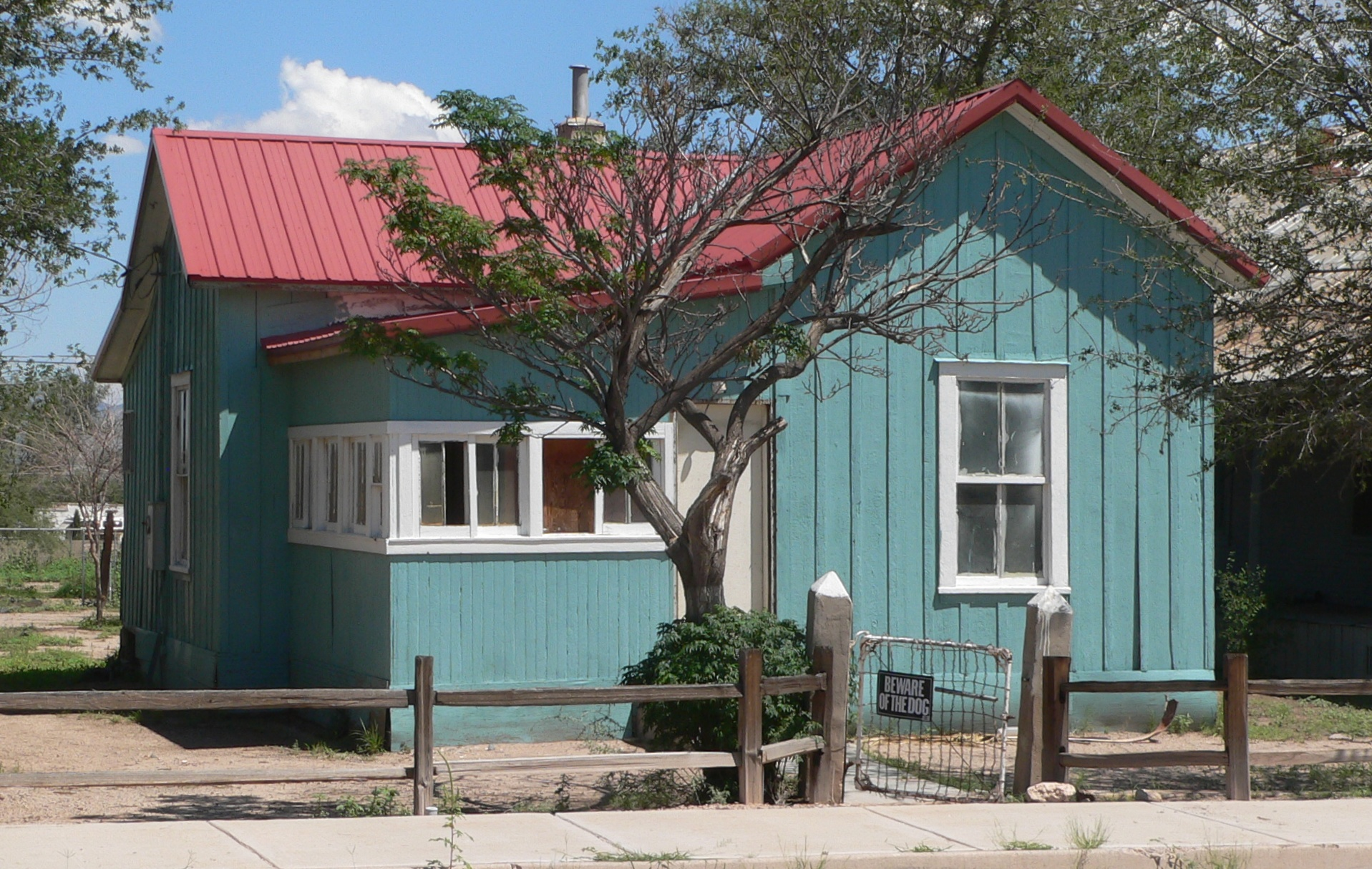
241 East 3rd Street

==== Vernacular frame ====
The original one-story buildings in the Benson townsite were constructed of dimension lumber with wood siding. There are three primary house forms which exhibit the vernacular frame architecture within the townsite: the front gabled shotgun house, the side-gabled hall and parlor house, and a front-facing "L" house. The district has five vernacular frame houses, two shotgun, one hall and parlor, and two L-shaped houses. One of the shotguns is at 223 East 3rd Street, it is an elongated floor plan, with a small brick addition on its east side. It has v-groove siding. The second shotgun is at 267 East 3rd Street, it has board and batten siding, and a shed roofed full-width front porch with slender wooden columns. The hall and parlor dwelling has a shed extension. It is in poor condition, and located between 267 and 285 East 3rd. The two L-shaped houses are located at 235 and 241 East 3rd. They also have board and batten siding, with sloped gable roofs. Both of the houses have had additions in the corner of "L".

==== Vernacular adobe ====
The single example of this is the building located in the alley east of the Arnold Hotel. It was built as a carriage house, and has large wooden doors and an addition of a wooden shed on its east side.

==== Queen Anne ====
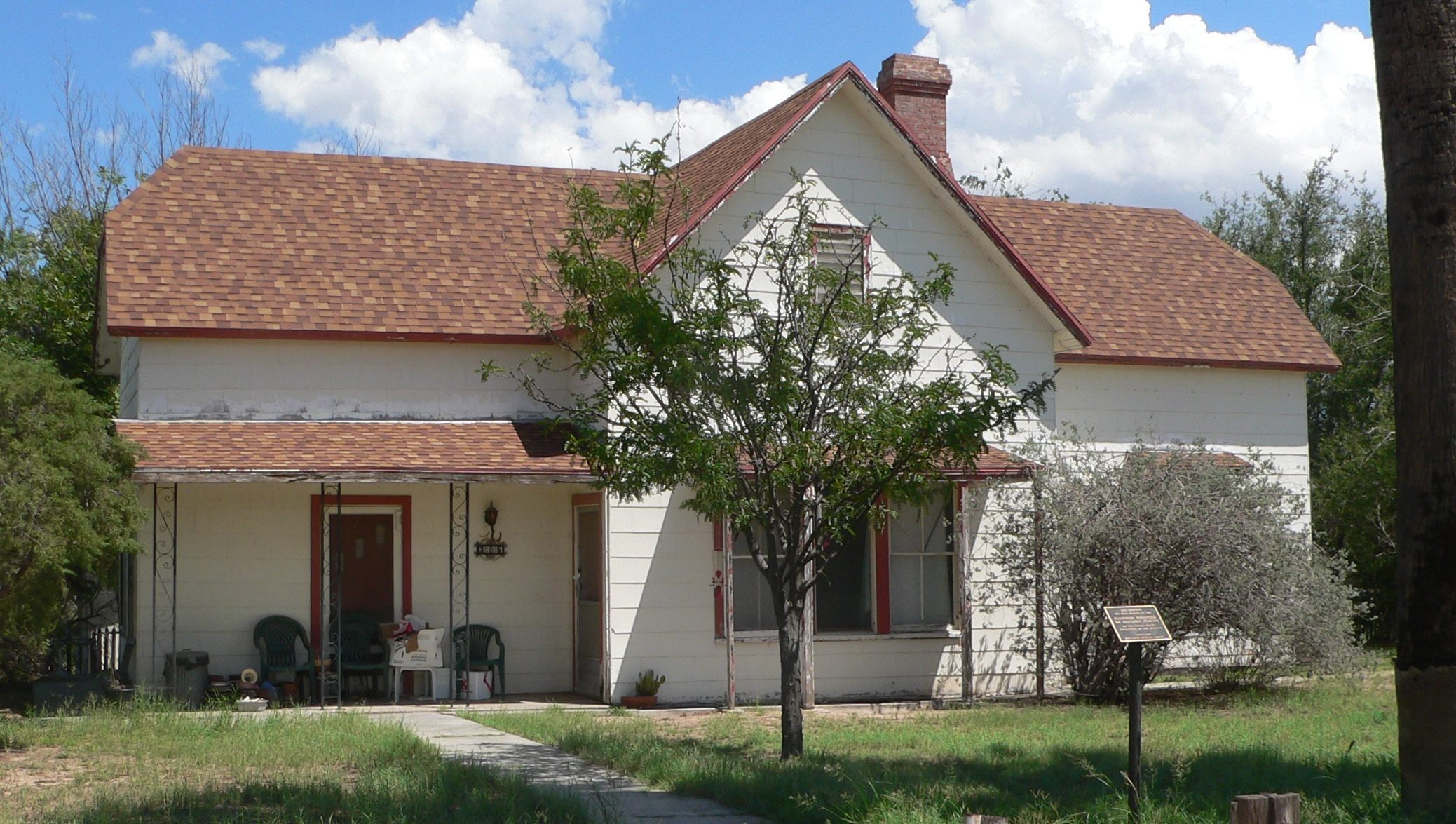
305 East 3rd Street

The Queen Anny style house is located at 305 East 3rd Street. It was the Roadmaster's residence. It is rectangular in shape, with an extension on the southern side. It has a cross-gable jerkinhead roof. When constructed it had a veranda which wrapped around three-quarters of the house, on the east, south, and west. The siding is wood tongue and groove. The entry has a small porch with a shed roof. It has a corbelled brick chimney, and the original picket fence. This house's property contains three non-contributing outbuildings, a corrugated metal shop, and two stuccoed structures.

==== Colonial revival ====
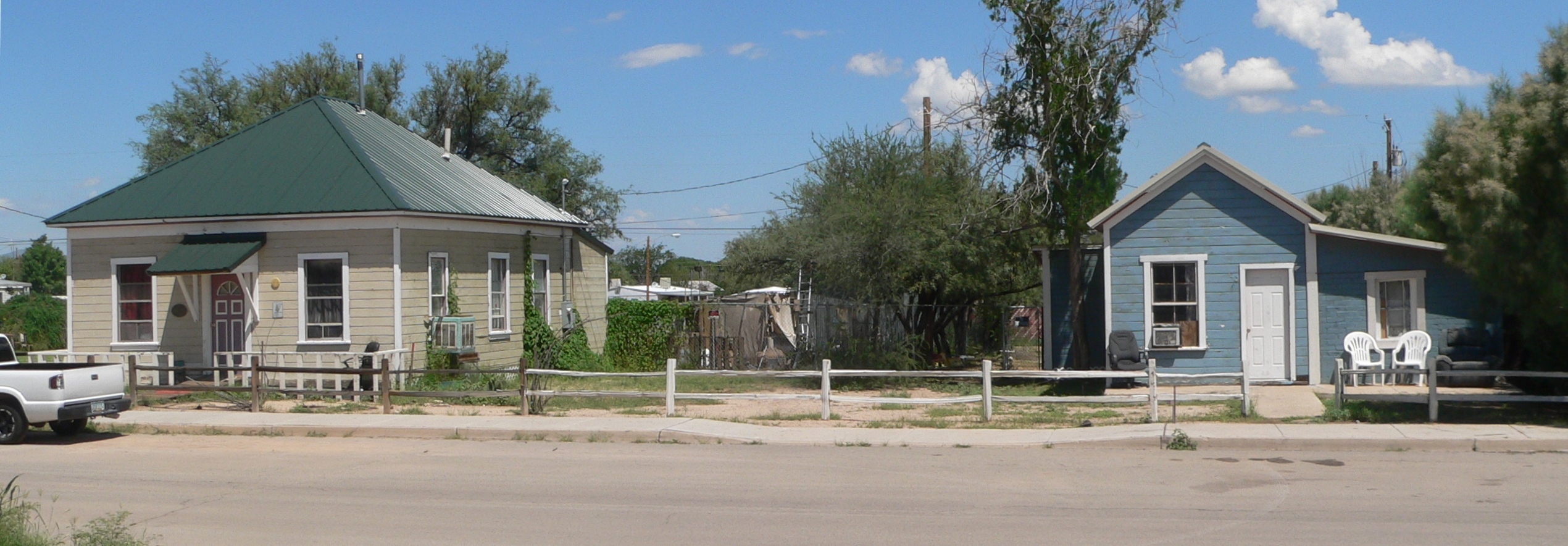
Benson, Arizona 201 (left) and 223 (right) East 3rd Street

The three colonial revival style homes are located at 201, 285, and 253 East 3rd Street. The house at 201 features a sloped pyramidal roof, the original "V" groove wood siding, boxed eaves and one-over-one light double hung windows. This property also has a non-contributing shed of corrugated metal. The house at 285 is a unique double-roofed structure. Originally, the structure had a single gabled roof, but when a rear addition was put on the house, the entire building had a second roof installed over the first, for insulation purposes. It is the largest example of double-roofing in Arizona. It is a frame house with symmetrical massing, and a veranda which wraps around three-quarters of the house. The final colonial style is the structure at 253, the Arnold Hotel. The building is a single story, with redwood framing, and is one of the largest historic buildings in Benson. It has a four-sided veranda, which is integrated into the main hipped roof, and has redwood columns. It has horizontal redwood siding, and the original roof was wood shingles, but has been replaced by a tin roof. The interior has tongue and groove redwood wall paneling. There is another non-contributing storage shed made of redwood on the hotel's grounds.

==== Commercial ====
There was a strong relationship between the former freight and passenger depot and nearby commercial structures, which were universally railroad related until 1910. Some isolated commercial buildings, which were not part of Benson's commercial strip, related instead to nearby residential neighborhoods. One such example in the Railroad District is on the corner of North San Pedro Street and the alley to the north. This is a unique and unusual brick row building constructed around the turn of the century, probably when Benson promoted its "brick and clay molding factory". The building features segmented arches three courses above the openings, articulated sills and lintels, and two-over-two light double hung windows. Although no information has been found regarding the building's original function, it was probably used for offices and perhaps a small store, based upon its placement along the property line with no setback. The north portion of the building appears to be older than the south portion.
