= CBRY =

CBRY may refer to:

- Copper Basin Railway (reporting mark CBRY)
- CBRY-FM, a radio station (105.1 FM) licensed to Alert Bay, British Columbia, Canada
