= Pinto Valley =

Pinto Valley may refer to:

- Pinto Valley (Nevada), basin in the Black Mountains of Clark County, Nevada
- Pinto Valley mine, copper mine located in Arizona
- Pinto Basin, a part of the Joshua Tree National Park
