= Santa Fe and Grand Canyon Railroad =

Former railway line in Arizona

Overview
- Headquarters: Williams, Arizona
- Locale: Arizona
- Dates of operation: 1897–1901

Technical
- Track gauge: 4 ft 8 1/2 in (1,435 mm) standard gauge

The Santa Fe and Grand Canyon Railroad (SF&GC) was a 56-mile railroad that ran from Williams, Arizona to take mining supplies and people to the copper mines near Anita. In 1901, the SF&GC was sold at foreclosure and became the Grand Canyon Railway, a subsidiary of the Atchison, Topeka and Santa Fe Railway. Today the line is a heritage railway owned by the Grand Canyon Railway (not related to the earlier railway) providing excursions to the Grand Canyon.

== History ==
The SF&GC was incorporated on July 31, 1897. On June 1, 1899, grading commenced and by October 1899 rails were being laid. By June 1900 the railroad was operating over a 56-mile line between Williams and Anita. Although the railway was named after the Grand Canyon, it never reached the canyon, stopping about 15 miles south of the South Rim of the Grand Canyon at the mining town of Anita. The railway quickly fell into financial problems and on September 5, 1900, was placed in receivership. In July 1901 the SF&GC was sold under foreclosure to the Atchison, Topeka and Santa Fe Railway.

The ATSF quickly began construction of the fifteen remaining miles of track to extend the line to the Grand Canyon. The line to the Grand Canyon was completed on September 16, 1901, and was renamed the Grand Canyon Railway.

== See also ==
- List of defunct Arizona railroads
