= Coronado Railroad =

Former mining railroad in Arizona

Overview
- Locale: Chase Creek
- Dates of operation: 1879–1932

Technical
- Track gauge: 20 in (508 mm)

Coronado Railroad was a 20 in (508 mm) gauge railroad which operated in a copper mining region of eastern Arizona.

The Coronado Railroad was the first narrow gauge railroad in Arizona, constructed by Henry Lesinsky in 1879 along Chase Creek, between mines and a smelter. Eventually the line connected mines via seven funicular railways and many miles of track. It operated 10 locomotives of 0-4-0T, 0-4-2T, and 0-4-4T wheel configuration. The mines and the railway were connected in ownership, and the railroad was not separately incorporated or a common carrier. Cars used were 4-wheel minecarts and flatcars.

The railroad operated as an isolated line until 1883 when a 3 ft (914 mm) gauge line reached Clifton to form an interchange with the Coronado. This connecting line, the Arizona and New Mexico, was converted to 4 ft 8 1/2 in (1,435 mm) standard gauge in 1901. Its former 3 ft (914 mm) gauge equipment was used to widen the 20 in (508 mm) line from Clifton to Shannon by 1903. This new 3 ft (914 mm) gauge line was incorporated as the Coronado Railroad.

Steam locomotives of the 20 in (508 mm) gauge system continued to operate, even after expansion of electric mine railways which captured a significant portion of the ore movement. After World War I operations on the 20 in (508 mm) was sporadic, with the entire system being shut down in 1932 and mostly removed by the later part of the 1930s.

Several 20 in (508 mm) gauge locomotives and cars from the Coronado Railroad and associated copper mining companies survived into preservation. Three locomotives were left abandoned on a hilltop until 1990, when they were removed over very steep terrain by dropping down a loaded truck reinforced with a cable attached to a bulldozer. One of the locomotives, "Rattlesnake," was purchased by an old engineer and maintained as a display. It now resides at the Arizona Railway Museum awaiting restoration. The Coronado Railroad was one of the smallest minimum gauge railroads that operated in North America.
