= San Manuel Arizona Railroad =

Short-line railroad

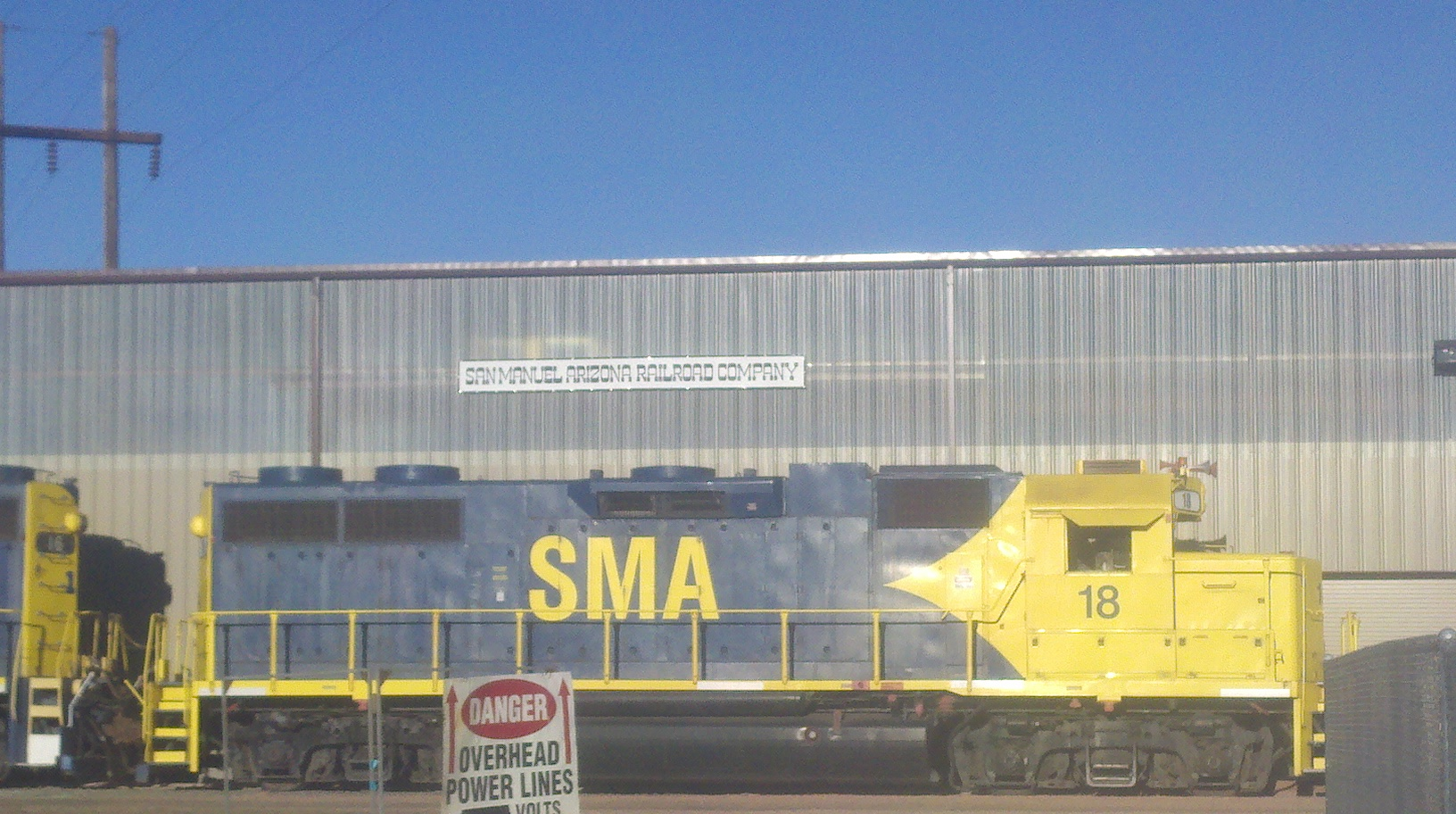
Two SMA EMD GP38-2 units heading south with empty cars

The San Manuel Arizona Railroad (reporting mark SMA) was an Arizona short-line railroad that operates from a connection with the Copper Basin Railway (CBRY) at Hayden, Arizona to San Manuel, Arizona, 29.4 miles (47.3 km).

== History ==
San Manuel Arizona Railroad was constructed by a joint venture consisting of Utah Construction Company and The Sterns-Roger Manufacturing Company, which had a contract with San Manuel Copper Corporation for the construction of the railroad. The company was incorporated September 29, 1953, and the railroad began operations in 1955. The copper mine at San Manuel was permanently closed in October 2003. The SMA ceased operations in 1999. In July 2012, work was started to re-open the operation [construction of a new locomotive inspection and servicing shop & Administrative Offices] and upgrade of 29+ miles of mainline track between San Manuel & Hayden (Arizona). In April 2013, it was announced the railroad would be purchased by Capstone Mining Corp. as part of the Pinto Valley Mine operation acquisition from BHP Billiton in 2013. Capstone idled the railroad in 2016.

== Donated equipment ==
In 2017, SMARRCO donated rider car #184 to the Arizona Railway Museum in Chandler, Arizona. This car along with two other rider cars were built by Magor Car Corporation in 1955 for SMARRCO. During operation, the conductor would ride in the car to operate the horn at grade crossings when the car was in the lead on the empty shove to the mine.
