= Old Pueblo Trolley =

Aspect of Arizona transit history

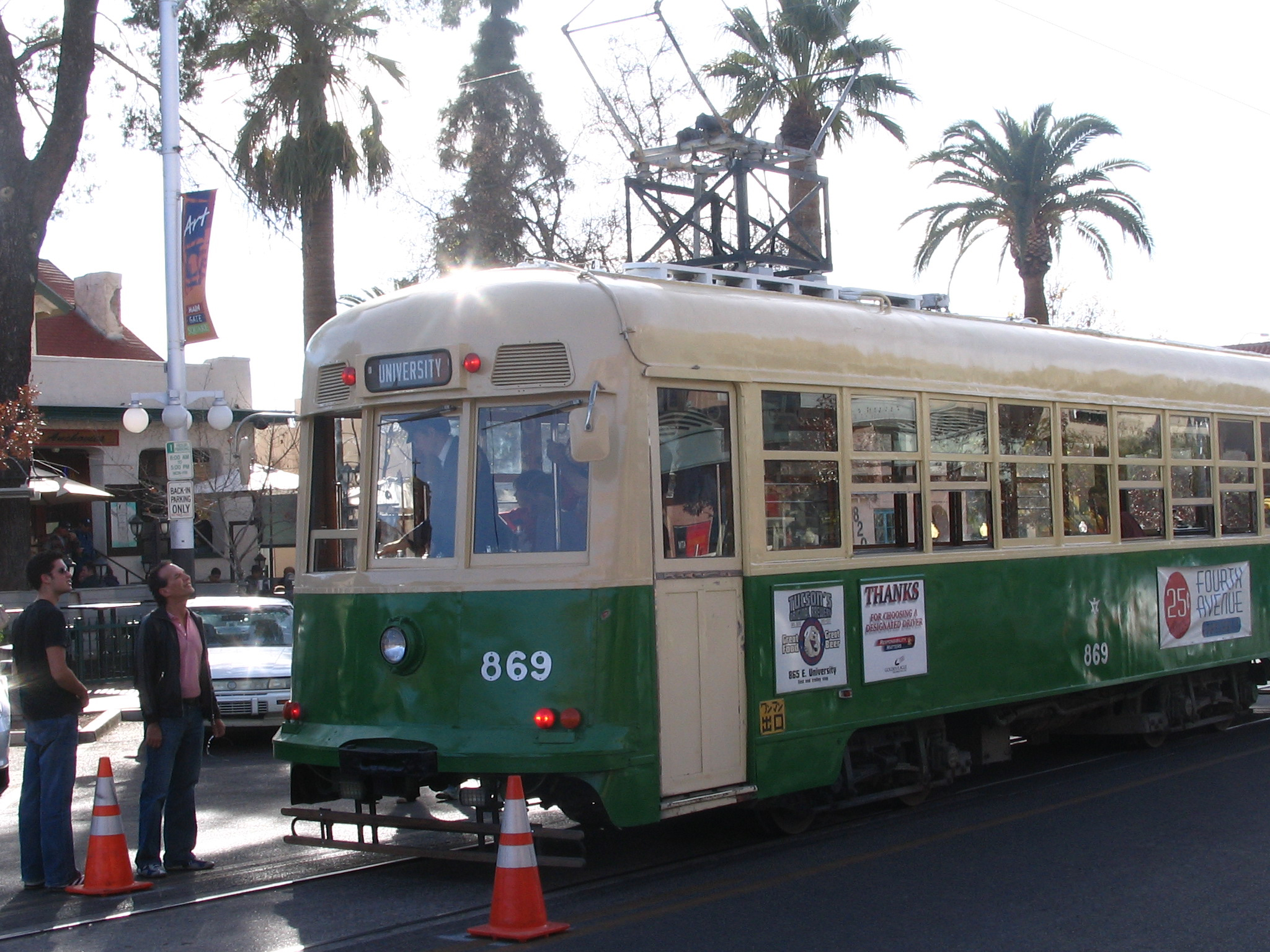
- The Old Pueblo Trolley car 869 at its University of Arizona terminus

Overview
- Status: Operation suspended
- Owner: Old Pueblo Trolley, Inc.
- Locale: Tucson, Arizona
- Termini: 5th Avenue (West); Tyndall Avenue (East)
- Stations: 11
- Website: www.oldpueblotrolley.com

Service
- Type: Heritage streetcar
- Services: Friday, Saturday, and Sunday service
- Operator: Old Pueblo Trolley
- Rolling stock: 3 trolleys, 2 motorbuses
- Daily ridership: 33,000 annually

History
- Opened: April 17, 1993
- Closed: October 8, 2011 (temporarily)

Technical
- Line length: 1 mi (1.6 km)
- Track gauge: 4 ft 8 1/2 in (1,435 mm) standard gauge
- Electrification: 750 V DC, overhead wire

Old Pueblo Trolley is a non-profit, educational corporation based in Tucson, in the U.S. state of Arizona, that is dedicated to the preservation of Arizona's mass transit history. The name also commonly refers to the heritage streetcar line which OPT began operating in 1993, on which service is currently indefinitely suspended. OPT consists of three divisions that each fill a specific role in preserving the state's mass transit history. The divisions are the Street Railway Division, Motor Bus Division and the Museum Division (Southern Arizona Transportation Museum).

Old Pueblo Trolley's streetcar line opened in 1993. The trolley last ran on October 31, 2011, when service was suspended for construction of the Sun Link modern-streetcar system.

Operating on Friday, Saturday, and Sunday, Old Pueblo Trolley ran on just over a mile of single-track line recovered from Tucson's original street railway. From its south terminus at 5th Avenue and Broadway Boulevard the trolley ran north on 4th Avenue before heading east on University Boulevard to its terminus at Tyndall Street, just west of the University of Arizona Main Gate.

== History ==
=== Tucson's original streetcar system ===
Electric streetcars began operating in Tucson on June 1, 1906, and replaced the horse- and mule-drawn cars as a mark of Tucson's "modernity". The event drew quite a crowd including the mayor, L.H. Manning and C.K. Durbin, owner of the new line. The Tucson Citizen ran an article "Electric Cars Running in Old Pueblo" in its Friday, June 1, 1906 edition.

It reported that two new electric cars left the corner of Stone Avenue and Congress Street at 2:00 p.m. for the University of Arizona filled with dignitaries and invited guests while an orchestra played a few tunes at the corner. The return trip was to Elysian Grove via Seventeenth where Emanual Drachman provided seats and refreshments for the banquet that followed. One car wore the banner, "The Goods Are Delivered L. H. M.", demonstrating that Mayor Manning had come through on his campaign platform to "promote and establish an electric streetcar system." Hence, Tucson was brought up to date, into the electric transportation era.

Streetcars ran for the last time on December 31, 1930, and were replaced by buses.

=== The heritage streetcar line ===
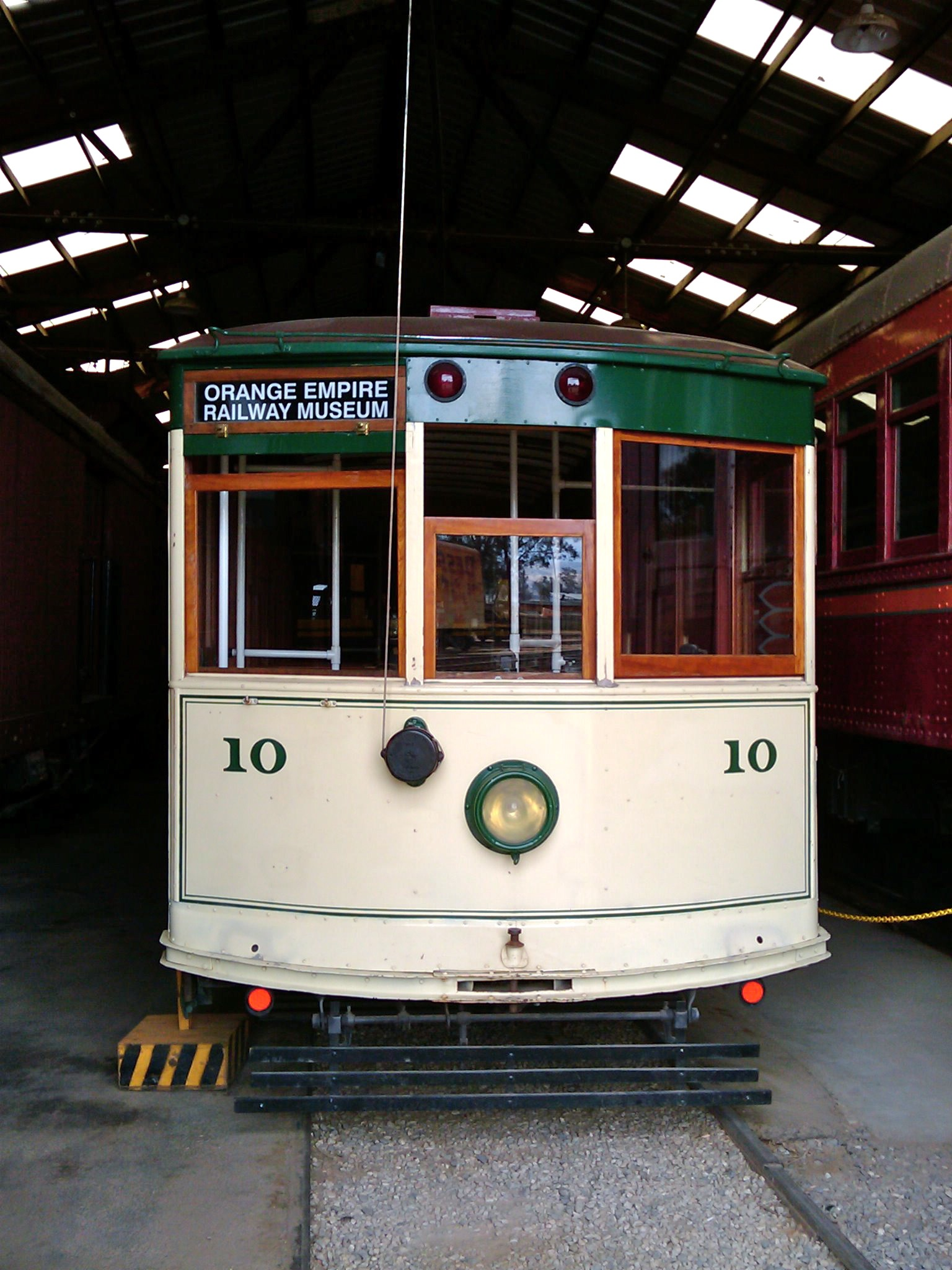
OPT's first streetcar was this Birney-type car, on loan from the Southern California Railway Museum until 1995.

Revival of the line began as the dream of Ruth Cross, director for the University of Arizona's Centennial Celebration in 1983, to see the historic streetcars returned to the Old Pueblo for the University's centennial. A 501(c)(3) non-profit organization, Old Pueblo Trolley (OPT), was formed to raise funds and coordinate planning with the city and business community, and volunteers also donated time to move the idea forward.

The Old Pueblo Trolley heritage streetcar line was inaugurated on April 17, 1993. Two trolley cars were available for service when the line opened, and were operated in the inaugural runs: Car 10, a 1918-built Birney-type car that was ex-Pacific Electric Railway 332 and was under lease to OPT from the Orange Empire Railway Museum (now the Southern California Railway Museum) since 1985, and car 255, ex-Osaka, Japan (Hankai Electric Tramway), which was built in 1953. Car 255 had been in service in Osaka until June 1992. The Birney car used a trolley pole, while the Japanese car used a pantograph, as it had on its home system. Before entering service, Birney car 10 was repainted from PE colors into the old livery of the former Tucson streetcar system, whose fleet had included an ex-Douglas, Arizona, Birney car of the same type, which was in service until the abandonment of the old Tucson system in 1930. Car 10's lease had started in 1985, but restoring it to operating condition took time and money, and only in 1991 did the car operate in Tucson for the first time under its own power. Before the start of public service in 1993, the Birney car operated occasionally for special events, for members of the OPT group.

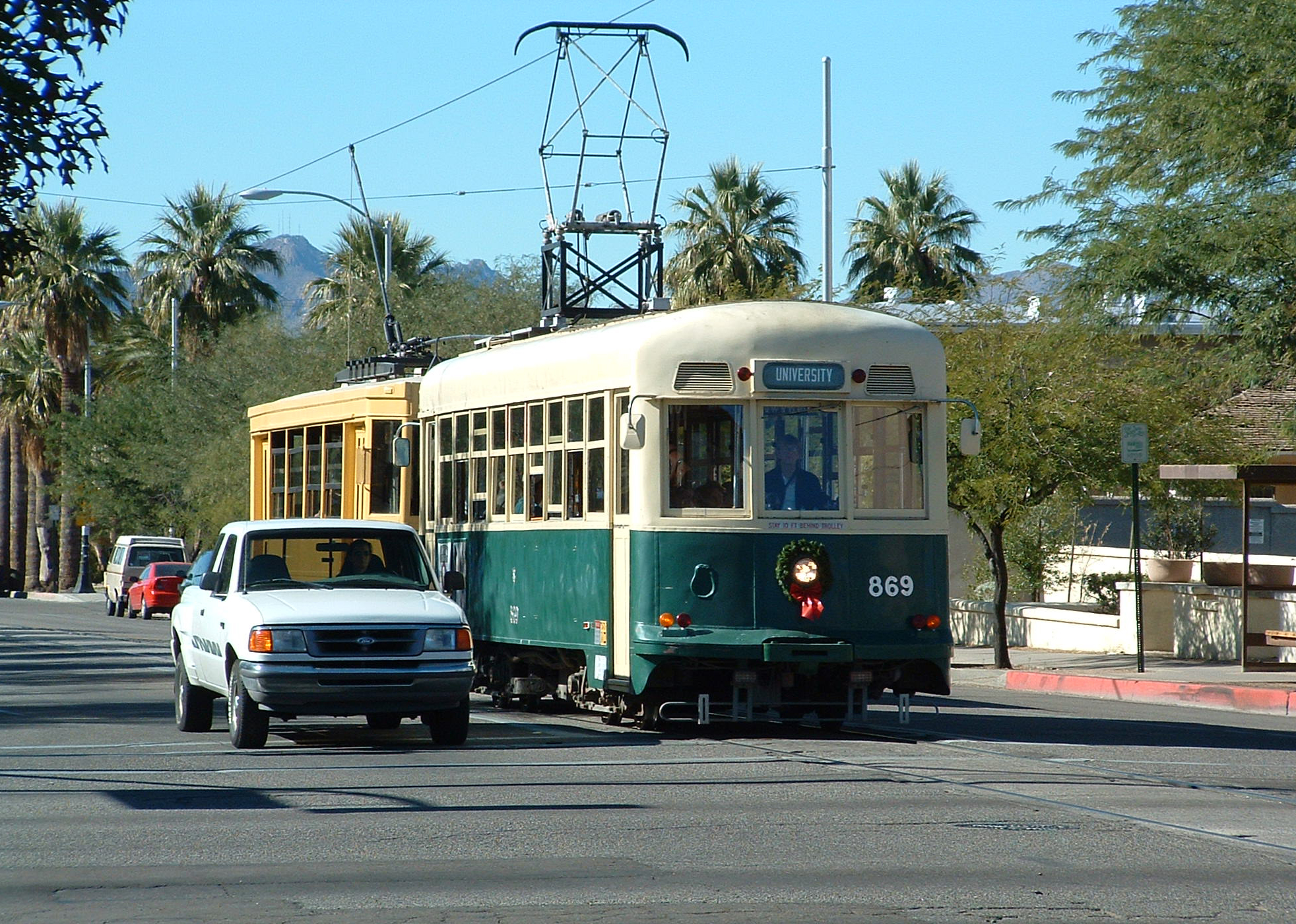
Japanese car and Belgian car on the heritage line in 2003

The line that opened as a heritage streetcar in 1993 used a combination of old, abandoned, paved-over track along University Avenue that was uncovered and rehabilitated, and new track along 8th Avenue and along 4th Avenue. Most of the line is two-way single-track, but it includes some double-track. Workers from Tucson Electric Power installed the overhead trolley wire, in some cases as volunteers.

=== Fleet ===
Tucson Old Pueblo Trolley №1
Former Lisbon car 524, built in Philadelphia by Brill in 1924, brought from Aspen, where it had been since 1973. Regauged from 900 mm to standard, restored to its original double-end configuration, and painted to pass for the very similar Prescott and Mt. Union №1.

==== Fleet changes ====
Car 10's lease from the Orange Empire Railway Museum expired in March 1995, and the museum was not willing to extend it, so car 10 ran in Tucson for the last time on June 4, 1995, and was moved back to OERM on June 9. The previous month, the 1953 ex-Osaka car returned to service after a 9-month overhaul that included restoring its original identity as Kyoto 869.

Meanwhile, additional historic trolleys were being acquired, to replace the Birney car and expand the fleet. Ex-Brussels, Belgium, car 1511, a two-axle car built in 1936, arrived in April 1995, having been stored for several years in Phoenix, where plans to use it in a restaurant did not come to fruition. Toronto car 4608, a 1951 PCC streetcar, arrived in June 1996.

=== 2009 extension ===
At 4:00 p.m. on August 20, 2009 the new 4th Avenue Underpass and 5th Avenue Loop were opened for traffic. The new 5th Avenue Loop runs west along Congress Street to Fifth Avenue, south on Fifth Avenue to Broadway Boulevard and west on Broadway Boulevard to the intersection of Congress Street and Fourth Avenue. New car stops on the Fifth Avenue Loop are at Ninth Street, Fifth Avenue and Congress Street.

== Impact of modern-streetcar project ==
In May 2006, the Regional Transportation Plan was adopted by a vote of almost 60% in favor. This election also passed a 20-year, 1/2-cent sales tax to finance the transportation improvements. Among the items in the plan was $75 million for the Sun Link modern streetcar system which follows the alignment of the Old Pueblo Line with extensions west through downtown to the Mercado District and north-east through the University of Arizona campus to the Arizona Health Sciences Center. The approved funds were a match to an equal amount of Federal Transit Administration funding. The new system is double-tracked, replacing the original OPT single track. A maintenance facility has been constructed just west of the present OPT car barn and yard on 9th Street west of 4th Avenue.

Old Pueblo Trolley suspended operations in October 2011. Construction of the new system began in April 2012, and the line – named Sun Link – opened in July 2014. OPT had hoped to be able to resume historic trolley operation on weekends and for special events, but by 2019 the organization had given up any hope of resuming operation on part of its former line. Instead, the group plans to construct a loop of track at a new site at South 4th and East 36th Street.

== Motor bus collection ==
The Motor Bus Division collects, restores and operates historic motor buses that are either representative of transit buses that were operated by carriers or public transit agencies in Arizona or are documented to have been owned and operated by carriers or public transit agencies in Arizona. The collection includes more than 20 coaches to date, most of which are stored at Old Pueblo Trolley's 36th Street facility. As of 2018, one bus has been completely restored (Warren Bisbee Lines No. 8, a 1938 Yellow Coach) and one bus has received necessary maintenance and been repainted, but requires replacement of its external advertising sign panels and minor interior work (Old Pueblo Transit Co. No. 135, a 1960 GMC TGH-3102). Buses currently under restoration include Warren Bisbee Lines No. 1 (1928 Twin Coach) and a Tucson Rapid Transit No. 50 (1946 Ford Transit Bus).

== New shop facility ==
In late 2014, a Property Acquisition Committee was formed to identify available properties that would be suitable for a new shop and museum center. The Motor Bus Division had previously moved restoration activities from the 18th Street Yard to a leased shop located at North Park Avenue and East Broadway Boulevard (Park Avenue Shop). That shop provided interior working space for two vehicles and exterior storage for approximately fifteen vehicles plus materials and several rail vehicles. At the time that the lease was executed with the City of Tucson, it was known that the shop would only be temporary as that property was subject to condemnation for the planned widening of Broadway Boulevard. Thus it was recognized that it was extremely important for OPT to acquire a permanent shop and museum site that would permit housing the entire collection of buses, archives, museum offices, shops and a display area.

During 2015, the Property Acquisition Committee identified potential sites and provided reports to the Board of Directors. Late in the year, a former cabinet shop located at South Fourth Avenue and East 36th Street in the City of South Tucson, Arizona was identified as being the most suitable property. The building was a large, open structure and had a large fenced outside yard as well as administrative offices and a reception area inside. The building had been acquired by a local bank under foreclosure and was available for a reasonable price. Negotiations were held with the bank and lending company and funding secured by donors to permit the acquisition of the facility (36th Street Shop). The deal closed in late December and renovations were begun shortly thereafter.

== Current activities ==
Presently, much of OPT's activities are related to relocating vehicles to the new 36th Street Shop located in South Tucson at 250 E. 36th St. In October 2016, the facility was formally dedicated and the shop named the "Jones-Brogan Building" in recognition of the founders of the 20th Century Electric Railway Foundation, their financial support being critical in our acquisition of the new facility. Staff are in the process of establishing a vocational training program that will provide local high school auto shop students experience in working on large commercial vehicles and diesel engines.

Current fundraising activities include a tax-deductible vehicle donation program and consignment antique automobile sales. All funds go to Old Pueblo Trolley's restoration and educational programs.

In 2017, the facility gained the services of a qualified electrician / machinist volunteer who set up a combined machine and fabricating area using donated machine tools. Along with supplying valuable service to museum's restoration needs, the machine shop does outside work with all of the proceeds going to support museum operations. More capabilities were added with the generous donation of sheet metal shop machines in late Fall 2019.

The museum lost their long-term storage depot in mid-town Tucson and, during the summer of 2019, moved a number of buses, trolleys and storage into their large back lot on 36th. Along with this consolidation, the trolley barn on E. 8th was repurposed and the trolley restoration shop was also moved to the 36th St. barn.

== See also ==
- List of Arizona railroads
- List of heritage railroads in the United States
- List of town tramway systems in the United States
- Sun Tran
