= Arizona and Swansea Railroad =

Former railway line in the Arizona Territory

Overview
- Headquarters: Swansea, Arizona
- Locale: Bouse-Swansea, Arizona
- Dates of operation: 1909–1937

Technical
- Track gauge: 4 ft 8 1/2 in (1,435 mm) standard gauge

The Arizona and Swansea Railroad (A&S RR) was a mining railroad that operated from a connection with the Arizona and California Railway (later the Santa Fe Railway) at Bouse to a copper and gold mine at Swansea, Arizona, 21 miles (34 km). The A&S RR was owned and operated by the Swansea Consolidated Gold & Copper Company.

== History ==
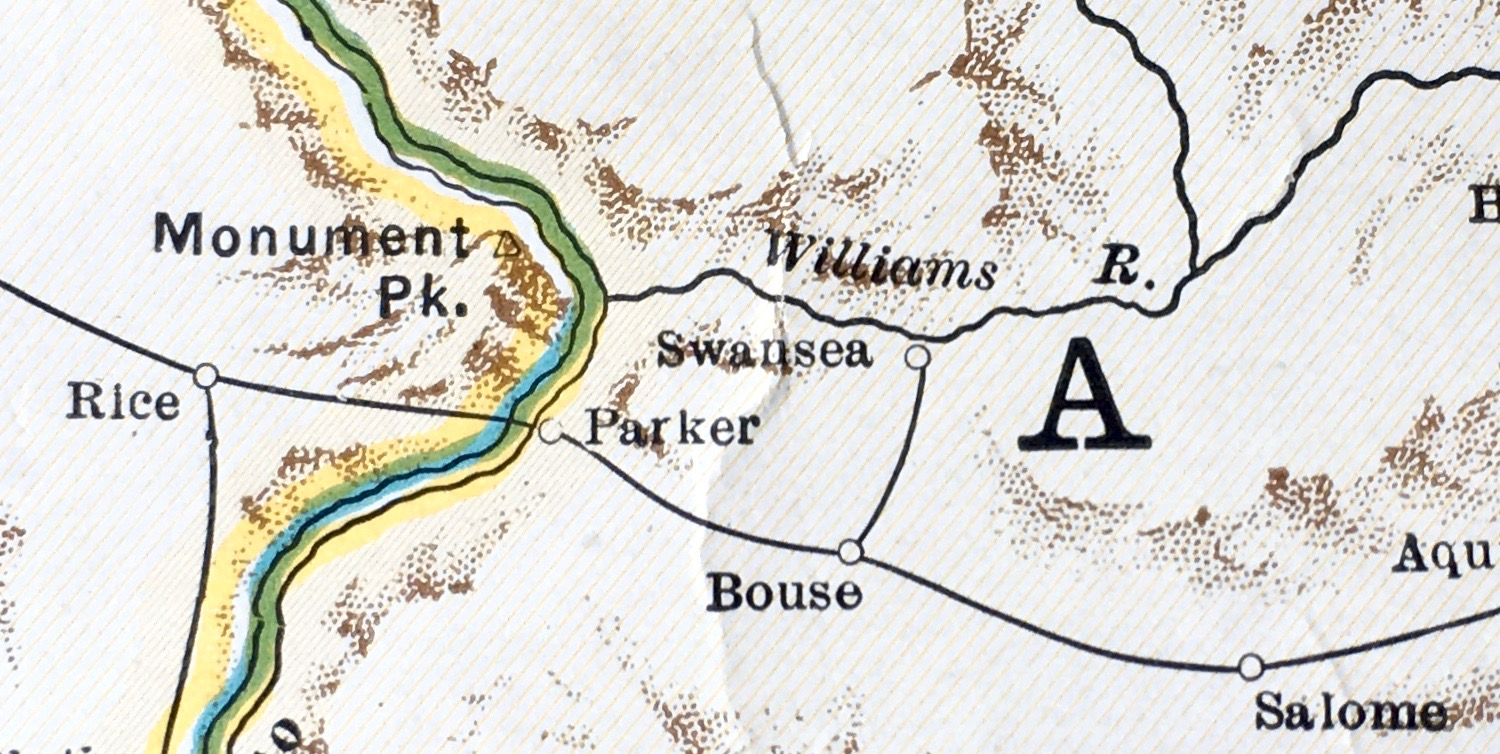
Route in 1930

The A&S RR was constructed in 1909 to build to the Clara Consolidated Mining Company at Swansea. Track construction commenced in November 1909 and the line was completed by December 31, 1909. In 1937 the A&S RR was abandoned.

== Motive Power ==
- Engine #1 was purchased used from the El Paso and Southwestern Railroad (#179) and was a 2-8-0 (Consolidation Type) locomotive built (Builder # 3852) by Baldwin Locomotive Works in 1876.
- Engine #3 was a 2-8-0 (Consolidation Type) locomotive that was purchased new (Builder #48024) in 1910 from the Schenectady Locomotive Works.

== Route ==
- 0.0 Bouse (Junction with Arizona and California Railway) - later the Santa Fe Railway
- 11.0 Midway, a watering stop marking the midpoint of the route, located at 34°04′14″N 113°53′12″W. Today, a Bureau of Land Management plaque marks the site.
- 16.0 Summit
- 18.5 Clara
- 21.1 Swansea

== See also ==
- List of defunct Arizona railroads
