= Copper Basin Railway =

Arizona short-line railroad

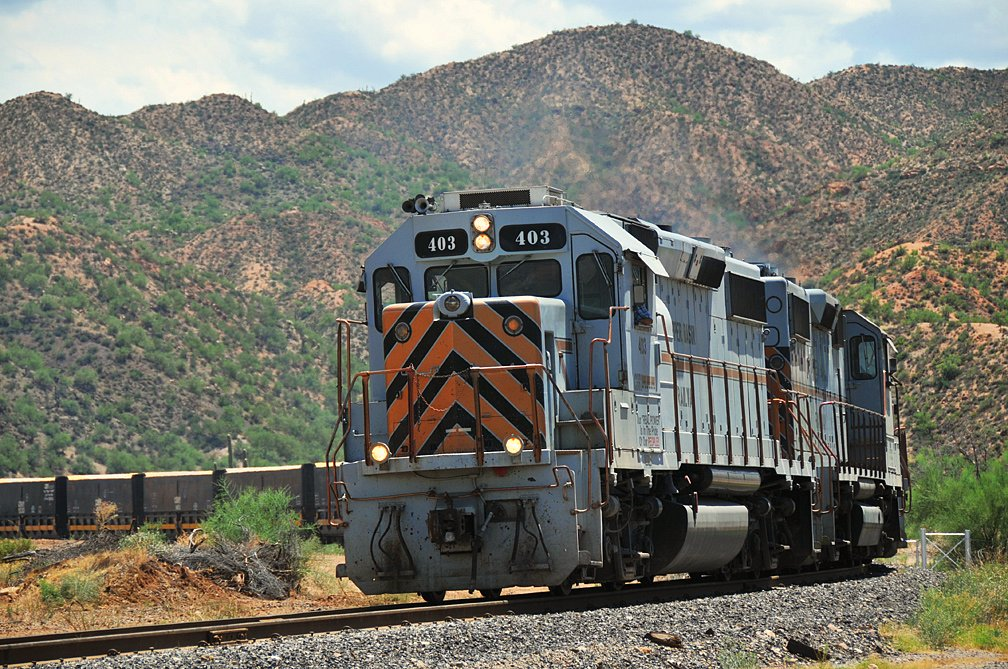
- CBRY 403, on the way to the Ray Mine, 2011

Overview
- Headquarters: Hayden, Arizona
- Reporting mark: CBRY
- Locale: Magma–Winkelman, Arizona

Technical
- Track gauge: 4 ft 8 1/2 in (1,435 mm)

Other
- Website: www.asarco.com/copper-basin-railway/

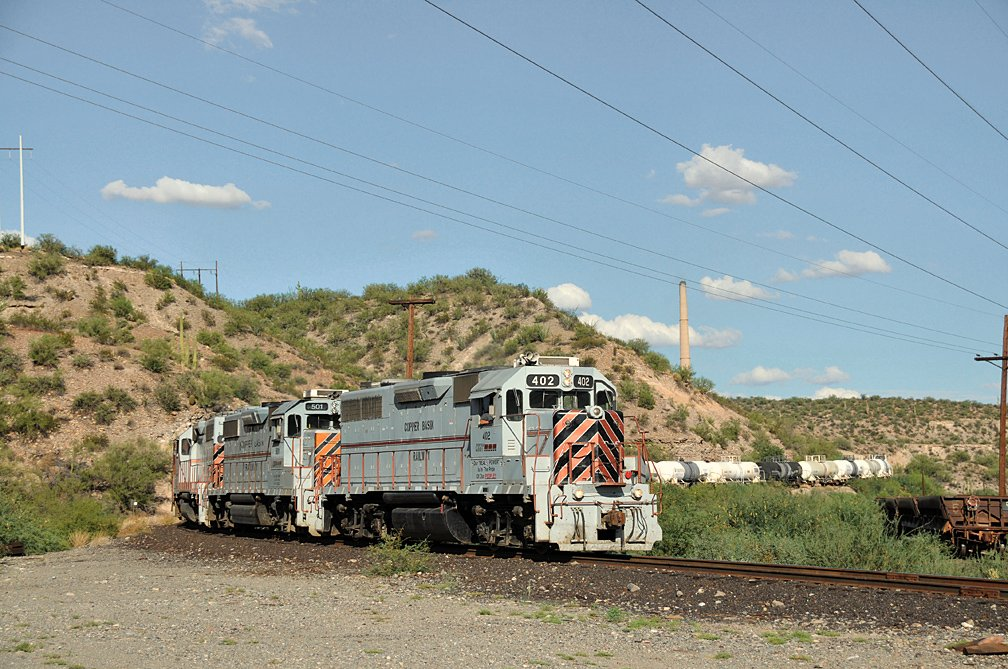
Copper Basin#402 hauling tanks of sulfuric acid from the Winkelman smelter to the Ray mine, to use in their leach operation.

The Copper Basin Railway (reporting mark CBRY) is an Arizona short-line railroad that operates from a connection with the Union Pacific Railroad (UP) at Magma to Winkelman, in 54 miles (87 km) of length. The railroad also has a 7-mile (11 km) branch line that runs from Ray Junction to Ray, Arizona. There was formerly an interchange with the San Manuel Arizona Railroad (SMA) at Hayden. The CBRY exists primarily to serve a copper mine. L. S. “Jake” Jacobson was the President and Chief Operating Officer, retiring in 2020 after more than 30 years in his position. In summer 2006, ASARCO Copper Corporation purchased the entire railroad.

== Traffic ==
107,000 cars per year (1996 estimate)

- copper concentrates
- ore
- finished and unfinished copper
- sulfuric acid
- lumber
- military equipment
- gypsum

== History ==
=== Magma–Winkelman line ===
The Magma–Winkelman line was constructed by the Atchison, Topeka and Santa Fe Railway (ATSF) subsidiary Phoenix and Eastern Railroad between 1902 - 1904. The Phoenix and Eastern Railroad built the railroad from Phoenix –Winkelman via Florence. It originally proposed to build to a connection with the Southern Pacific Railroad (SP) at Benson but the line was never built past Winkelman.

- December 10, 1904 - the railroad was leased to Santa Fe upon completion of construction and was operated by ATSF subsidiary Santa Fe, Prescott and Phoenix Railway.
- March 13, 1907 - the Phoenix & Eastern became an operating subsidiary of SP.
- March 10, 1910 - the Phoenix & Eastern was leased and became a non-operating subsidiary of SP and operated by the Arizona Eastern Railroad.
- 1911 - the track at Winkelman was extended 6.35 miles (10.22 km) to Christmas, Arizona by the Arizona Eastern Railway.
- October 31, 1945 - the railroad was sold to the Arizona Eastern Railroad.
- September 30, 1955 - the Arizona Eastern Railroad was merged into SP.
- 1961 - the track from Winkelman to Christmas, Arizona was abandoned by SP.
- At some point SP sold the line to mine operator Kennecott Copper.
- August 15, 1986 - the line was sold by Kennecott Copper and the CBRY was started.
- 1986–2005 - the CBRY was owned by Rail Management Corporation.
- 2006 (summer) - ASARCO Copper Corporation purchased the entire railroad. ASARCO also owns the Ray Mine and Hayden Smelter, CBRY's primary customers.

This railway served as the backdrop to Dwight Yoakam’s “A Thousand Miles from Nowhere” music video. He is seen near the tracks and moving about a train throughout the video.

== Route ==
The route primarily follows the Gila River.

- Magma (Webster) – UP/MAA
- Florence Junction
- Florence
- Stanco
- Barr
- Munn (Alta)
- Price
- Tunnel 1 (over 630 feet or 190 metres in length, second in Arizona only to the 680 feet or 210 metres tunnel on the Arizona Central Railroad).
- Cochran
- North across the Gila River can be seen the Coke Ovens, several "beehive" kilns. Made from rock, they were originally built to make coke out of local timber and copper/silver ore.
- Butte
- Zellweger
- Wooley
- Ray Junction
- Tunnel 2
- Riverside
- Erman
- Tunnel 3
- Kearny
- Branaman
- Burns
- Hayden Junction. Location of the operational center for the SP until the system was rebuilt to have ore trains go directly from Ray to Hayden for unloading onto a new conveyor system.
- Hayden (office)
  - Spur to Kennecott Copper (KCCX) Mill and Smelter
- KCCX Ore Unload
- San Manuel Arizona Railroad Junction (to San Manuel and Mammoth Mine)
- Winkelman
