= San Pedro Valley Railroad =

Shortline railroad in Arizona

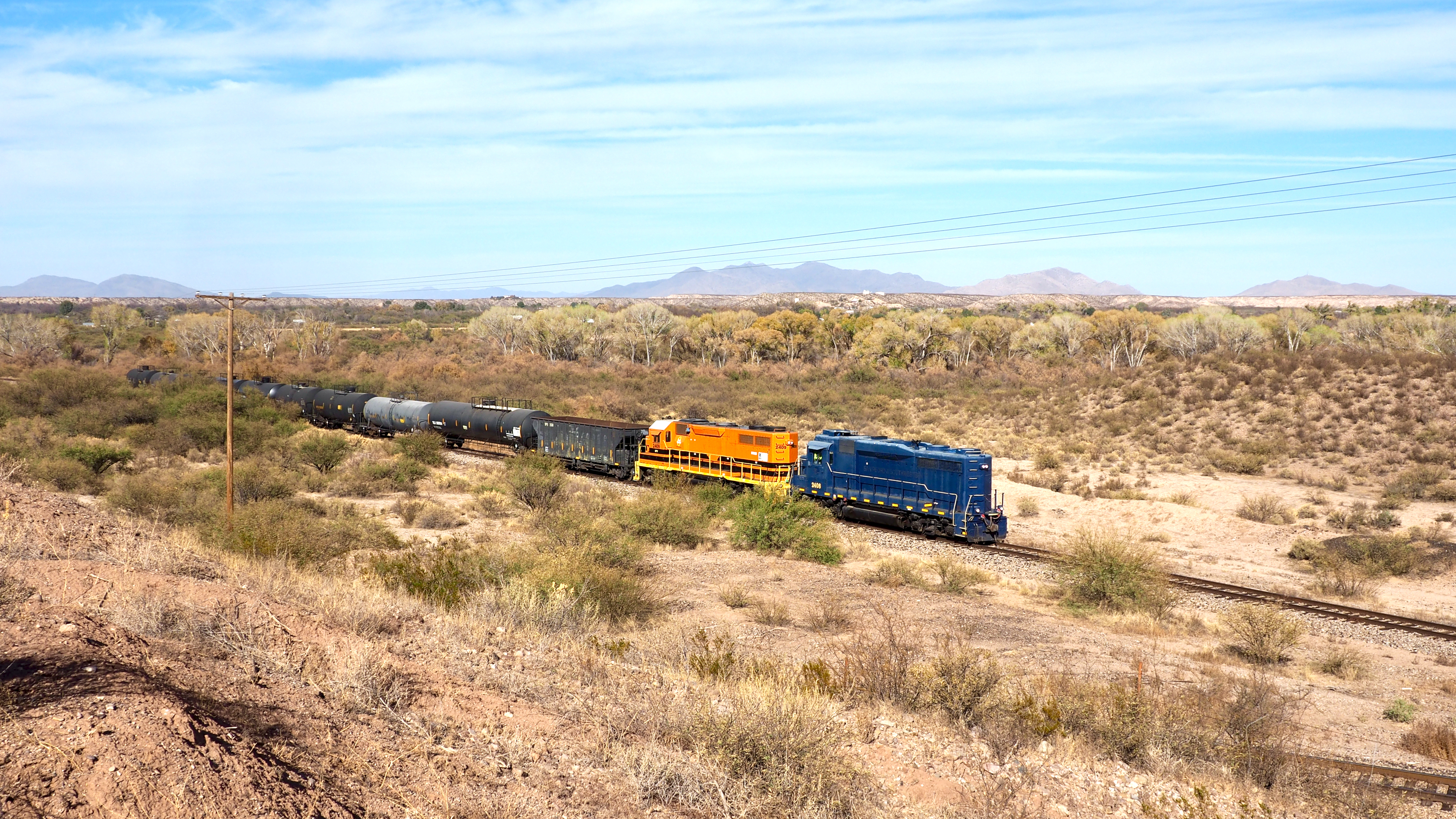
- Freight near St. David, November 2020

Overview
- Headquarters: Benson, Arizona
- Reporting mark: SPVR
- Locale: Southern Arizona
- Dates of operation: 2003–

Technical
- Track gauge: 4 ft 8 1/2 in (1,435 mm) standard gauge

Other
- Website: ironhorseresources.com/rail-lines/san-pedro-valley-railroad/

The San Pedro Valley Railroad (reporting mark SPVR), formerly the San Pedro & Southwestern Railroad (SPSR), is an Arizona shortline railroad operating two unconnected segments of line in Cochise County, Arizona, with the “Benson Track” running from a connection with the Union Pacific Railroad (UP) at Benson south seven miles to an unincorporated area west of St. David called at one time Curtiss, together with the separate short “Willcox Track” which provides industrial switching and UP interchange at Willcox, collectively 10+ miles in total length. The SPSR formerly ran a total of 76.2 miles (122.6 km), with main track from Benson to Paul Spur, a location about 10 miles (16 km) west of Douglas, as well as the Bisbee Branch which ran 5.6 miles (9.0 km) to Bisbee, Arizona. The SPVR is owned by Ironhorse Resources.

The SPSR commenced operations in November 2003 after David Parkinson acquired the San Pedro and Southwestern Railway (reporting mark SWKR) from RailAmerica in 2003 with "the intent of restoring transborder rail service with the Mexican rail system at Naco, Arizona, and developing North American Free Trade Agreement-related traffic, but that this plan never materialized." David Parkinson had owned several other shortlines in the western US, such as the California Northern Railroad, under his ParkSierra Rail Group, which was sold in 2002 to RailAmerica, which was purchased in turn by Genesee & Wyoming in 2012.

SWKR's traffic was weak and consisted of coal and coke for Chemical Lime on the Paul Spur, the only on-line shipper. Chemical Lime generated only between 380 and 500 carloads per year which SWKR claimed was inadequate to sustain the railroad. SWKR decided to abandon the line south of Curtiss in March 2005 due to limited freight business and the lack of prospects for future traffic increases.

On February 3, 2006, the Surface Transportation Board (STB) authorized abandonment of the line (STB Docket #AB-1081-0-X). However, on February 13, 2006, Sonora-Arizona International (SAI) filed an offer of assistance with the STB, to acquire the line for $5.6 million.

On July 18, 2006, the Cochise County Board of Supervisors declined to write a letter suggesting the line be converted to a trail, saying investors should be given sufficient time to arrange reactivating the line.

== History ==
The SPSR traces its origins back to May 24, 1888, when the Arizona and South Eastern Railroad (A&SE) was incorporated with headquarters at Bisbee, Arizona. Bisbee was a booming mining town that by the 1890 census was the sixth largest city in Arizona.

In 1888 Arizona & Southeastern built a 60-mile (97 km) line southward along the San Pedro River from a connection with the Southern Pacific Railroad at Benson to Bisbee. The A&SE track partially paralleled the New Mexico and Arizona Railroad (NM&A) that was built six years earlier (1882) on the opposite side of the San Pedro River from Benson to Fairbank. The NM&A then went southwest to Nogales via Sonoita and Patagonia.

On June 17, 1902, the Arizona & Southeastern was sold to the El Paso and Southwestern Railroad (EP&SW) and the line was extended through Douglas to El Paso. On November 1, 1924, the EP&SW was leased to the Southern Pacific. In 1955, the EP&SW was merged into the SP. At that time, four of SP's five daily passenger trains used the route via Douglas with only one via Bowie; but by 1966, the line east of Douglas into New Mexico was abandoned. The section between Paul Spur and Douglas was abandoned in the 1990s.

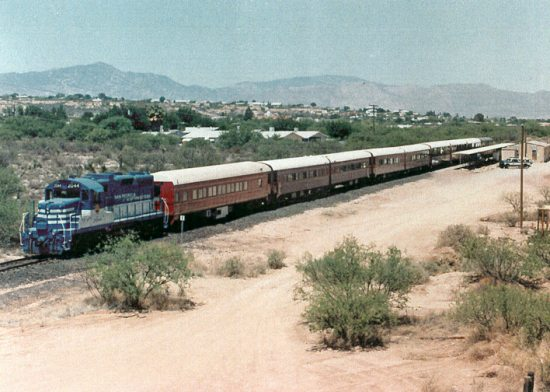
Excursion train at Benson depot

On June 15, 1992, SP sold the line to Kyle Railways and operations commenced as the San Pedro & Southwestern Railway (SWKR). For several years starting in 1995, the SWKR ran an excursion train from Benson to Charleston. In 1997, the track was abandoned beyond Curtiss. On January 22, 1997, the SWKR was acquired by StatesRail but continued to operate as the SWKR. On January 7, 2002, the SWKR was acquired by RailAmerica.

The San Pedro Railroad Operating Company (SPROC) commenced operations in November 2003 when it purchased the San Pedro & Southwestern Railway (SWKR) from RailAmerica. The SPROC later filed for abandonment of the southern portion of the line. The STB approved abandonment of the entire line by SPROC on February 6, 2006.

SAI made an offer of financial assistance to the STB, and was granted the option of ownership of the line on May 3, 2006. The STB ruled that the Offer of Financial Assistance (OFA) deal of the agreed upon price of $5.6 million for the SPROC railroad line from Curtiss to Naco and Paul Spur must close on or before July 12, 2006. On July 12, 2006, the attorneys for the Sonora–Arizona International LLC re-filed with the STB that they were withdrawing their OFA and that the SAI would no longer be purchasing the railroad line.

The San Pedro Railroad Operating Company then refiled on July 13 to ask for approval to immediately abandon the line. Removal of the rails, ties and related infrastructure began in early 2007 south of Curtiss, to Paul Spur.

In October 2018, the line was sold by ARG Transportation Services to Ironhorse Resources and renamed the San Pedro Valley Railroad.
