= Gila Valley, Globe and Northern Railway =

Common carrier in Bowie, Arizona Territory

Overview
- Headquarters: Bowie, Arizona
- Locale: Arizona
- Dates of operation: 1894–1910

Technical
- Track gauge: 4 ft 8 1/2 in (1,435 mm) standard gauge

The Gila Valley, Globe and Northern Railway was a common carrier incorporated on January 24, 1894. The railway built from a connection with the Southern Pacific Railroad at Bowie, Arizona (known as Teviston until 1908), and continued northwest for 125.75 miles to its terminus at the mining town of Globe, Arizona. The railroad also had a 10-mile branch that extended from Globe to Miami, Arizona.

The GVG&N's first locomotive was originally the famed Central Pacific "Jupiter" locomotive. The locomotive was purchased in 1894, by which time it had been substantially rebuilt, bearing little resemblance to its original form. Renumbered as GVG&N no. 1, the locomotive operated until scrapped in 1909.

== Timeline ==
The Gila Valley, Globe and Northern Railway was incorporated on January 24, 1894. Grading of the new line began shortly thereafter on February 8, 1894. The first rails were laid on or about May 10, 1894.

Annual ICC reports showed a steadily increasing number of track miles in use as the railway grew:

- June 30, 1895 – 62 miles
- June 30, 1896 – 68 miles
- June 30, 1898 – 88 miles
- June 30, 1899 – 127 miles

In 1901, the railway was purchased and became an operating subsidiary of the Southern Pacific. Southern Pacific merged the GVG&N with another subsidiary, the Arizona Eastern Railway, ending its existence as separate entity on February 1, 1910.
