= Pinto Valley Mine =

Copper mine in Arizona, US

Coordinates: 33°25′55″N 110°57′27″W

- Interactive map of Pinto Valley Mine
- Location: Gila County, Arizona, United States
- Products: Copper
- Company: Capstone Copper
- Website: capstonemining.com

The Pinto Valley Mine is a large copper mine located in Arizona, in the southwestern part of the United States. Pinto Valley represents one of the largest copper reserves in the United States and in the world, having estimated reserves of 446 million tonnes of ore grading 0.25% copper. It is located in Gila County, near the town of Miami.

The mine owns the San Manuel Arizona Railroad.
