= Sun Link =

Streetcar system in Tucson, Arizona

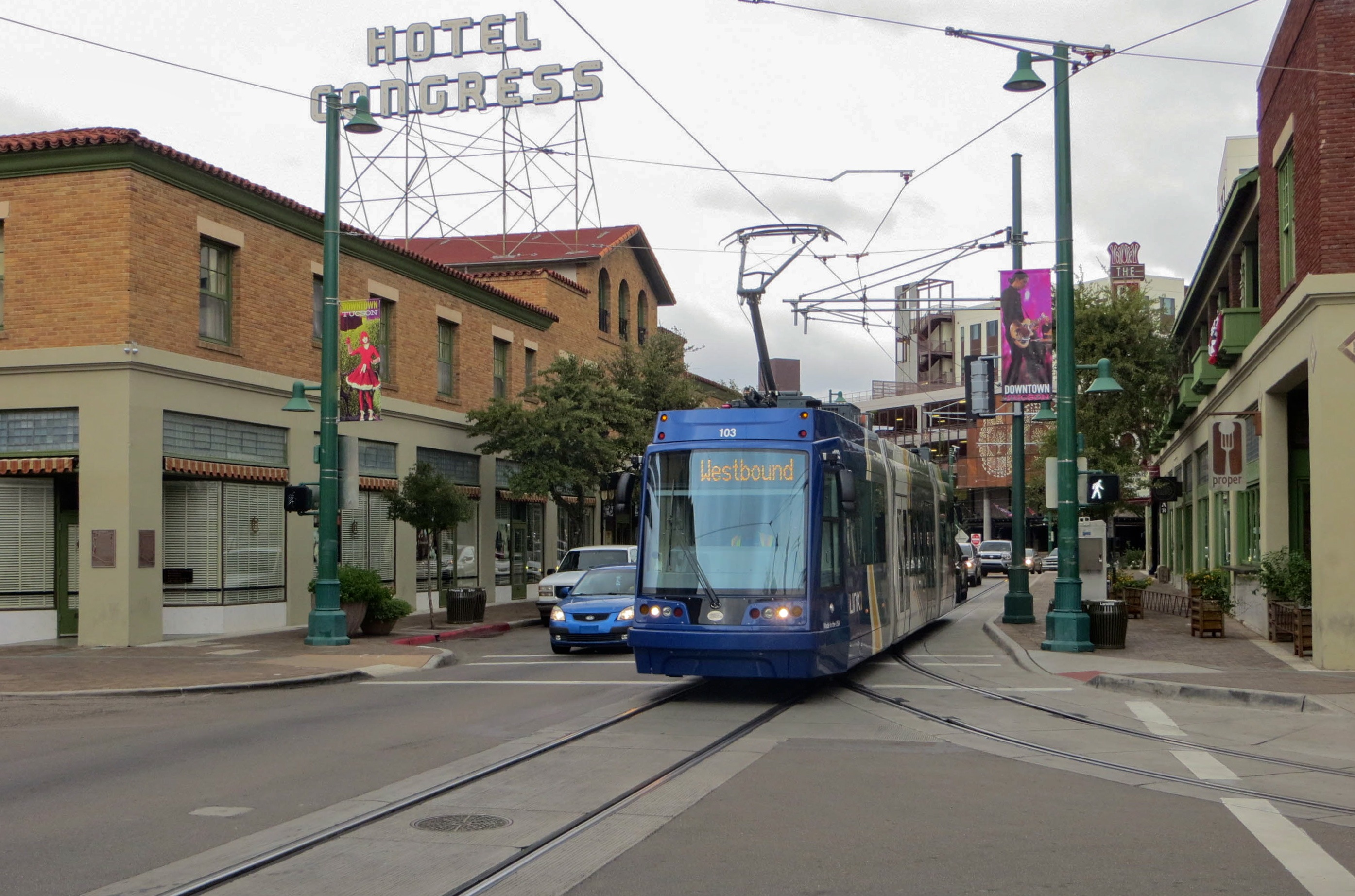

Overview
- Owner: City of Tucson
- Locale: Tucson, Arizona, United States
- Coordinates: 32.2277°N 110.9656°W
- Termini: Arizona Health Sciences Center; Mercado District
- Stations: 21 (17 per direction)
- Website: sunlinkstreetcar.com

Service
- Type: Streetcar
- Operator(s): RATP Dev
- Rolling stock: United Streetcar 200 (8 cars)
- Daily ridership: 4,500 (weekdays, Q4 2025)
- Ridership: 1,535,900 (2025)

History
- Opened: July 25, 2014

Technical
- Line length: 3.9 miles (6.3 km)
- Track gauge: 4 ft 8 1/2 in (1,435 mm) standard gauge
- Electrification: Overhead line, 750 V DC
Route map
Sun Link highlighted in black

Sun Link, also known as the Tucson Streetcar, is a single-line streetcar system in Tucson, Arizona, United States, that began service in July 2014. The system's 3.9-mile (6.3 km) route connects the Arizona Health Sciences Center (including University Medical Center), the University of Arizona campus, the Main Gate and 4th Avenue shopping and entertainment districts, downtown Tucson, the Tucson Convention Center, and the Mercado District under development west of Interstate 10. The streetcar project's overall cost of $196 million was met through a combination of local funding sources and federal grants. The streetcar shares a common payment system with the Sun Tran regional bus service. In 2025, the line had a ridership of 1,535,900, or about 4,500 per weekday as of the fourth quarter of 2025.

== History ==
=== Funding ===
In May 2006 Pima County voters approved a $2.1 billion, 20-year regional transportation plan which included $75 million toward construction of a modern streetcar and an additional $12.7 million toward its operation. In December 2010, a $63 million federal TIGER grant was awarded to the City of Tucson, meeting most of the remaining funding gap and allowing the project to move forward. An additional $6 million of federal funding was obtained through the Federal Transit Administration's New Starts program. Funding also came from utilities for relocation and improvements along the streetcar route, most significantly $10.6 million from Tucson Water.

=== Construction ===
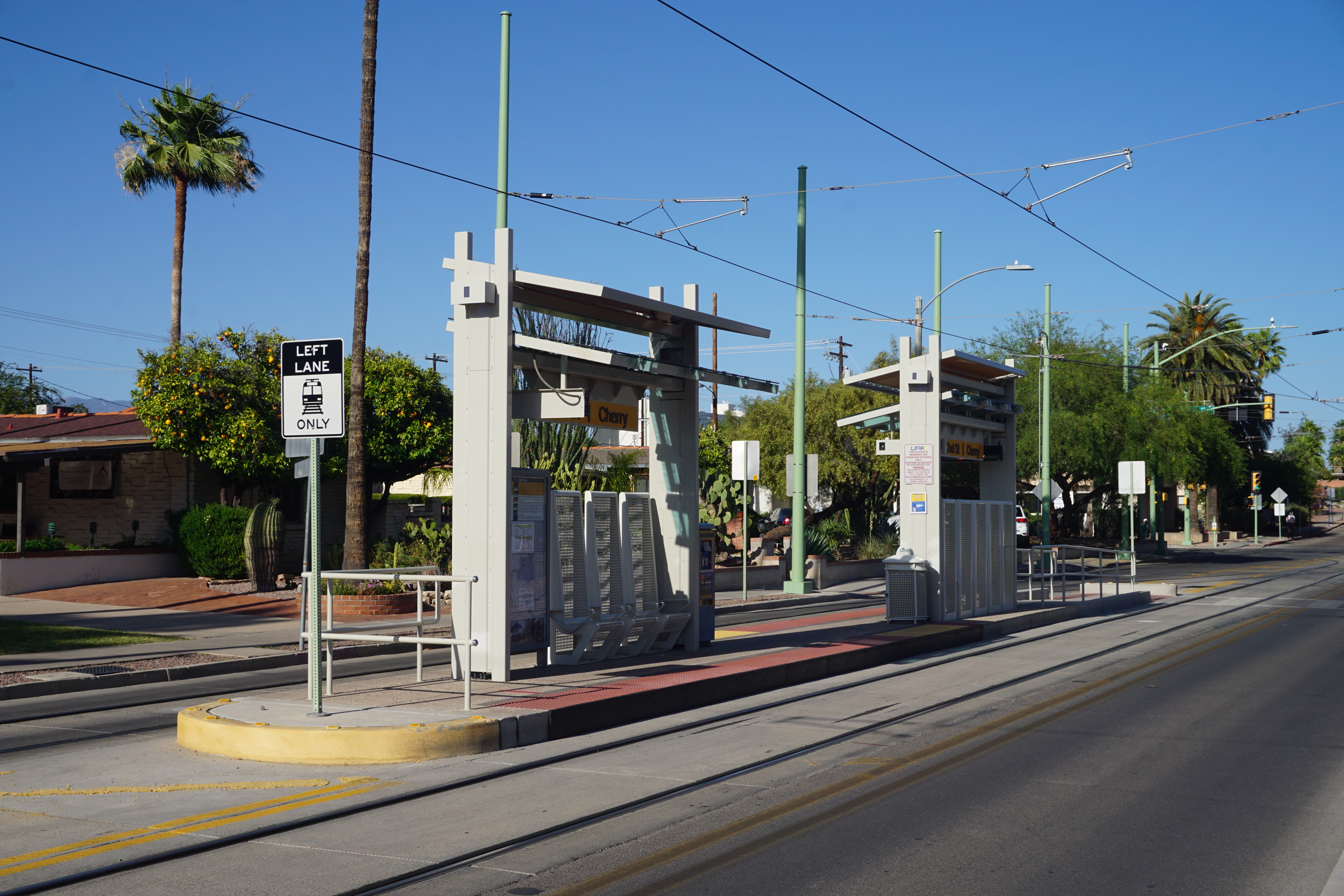
Sun Link streetcar stop

A $56 million contract for removal of existing roadway, utility relocation, installation of track, resurfacing, and construction of the system's 21 covered, accessible stops was awarded to Old Pueblo Trackworks, a joint venture of Granite Construction and RailWorks Track Systems, in March 2012. Construction began in April 2012 and continued through summer 2013. The first phase addressed straight sections of the route east of the Congress and Granada stop and required rolling closures of sections of Congress Street, Broadway Boulevard, 4th Avenue, University Boulevard, 2nd Street, the Warren Avenue underpass, and Helen Street. Phase two began in November 2012 and included all work west of the convention center, corner sections requiring fabrication of curved track elements, and additional work on Broadway and the Warren underpass.

A 320-foot (98 m) bridge across the Santa Cruz serving streetcar, automobile, bicycle, and pedestrian traffic was constructed in 2012 under a separate contract. Named for former Tucson city manager Luis G. Gutierrez, the bridge extends Cushing Street from the I-10 frontage road to Avenida del Convento, providing a link between the Tucson Convention Center and the Mercado District.

Construction of the Sun Link Operations & Maintenance Facility, an $8 million depot centered on the system route at 5th Avenue and 8th Street, began in May 2012. A public open house celebrating its completion and delivery of the first streetcar was held on September 6, 2013, with speeches from officials including Tucson mayor Jonathan Rothschild and state senator Steve Farley, a longtime advocate of the streetcar. Revenue service began in July 2014.

=== Proposed expansion ===
In late 2019, media reports surfaced that the City of Tucson was looking into options for expanding the streetcar network. The potential expansion could go as far north as Tucson Mall and reach Tucson International Airport south of the city, connecting all three of the city's main transit hubs: Laos, Ronstadt(Downtown), and Tohono Transit Center. Tucson and South Tucson have requested funding from Federal Transit Administration for a feasibility study, pending approval. But the project was never officially announced.

On October 30, 2023, City of Tucson announced the Tucson Rapid Transit, a BRT project over the original streetcar expansion alignment that was widely-anticipated, thus there is no longer any expansion to the streetcar network that is being planned or studied.

== Route ==
The Sun Link streetcar line travels 3.9 miles (6.3 km) from the Arizona Health Sciences Center, west through downtown Tucson, and to the Mercado District. North of the Warren Avenue stop, the streetcar passes under Speedway Boulevard on a single-track line in a dedicated right of way. After reaching its northern terminus at Helen, the car reverses direction. In all but one or two other places along the route, the streetcar operates with traffic.

Districts, connections, & destinations
District	Stop	Connections	Destinations
University	Warren Avenue & Helen Street	Sun Tran: 4, 5, 15; Cat Tran: Purple, Green	Arizona Health Sciences Center
University	Warren Avenue Underpass		
University	2nd Street & Cherry Avenue	University Bike Blvd. Cat Tran: Mountain	Hillenbrand Stadium, Flandrau Science Center, McKale Center, Arizona Stadium
University	2nd Street & Highland Avenue	Mountain Avenue Bikeway; 2nd St.	UA Student Union Memorial Center
University	2nd Street & Olive Road	Cat Tran: USA, Inner Campus; Park Avenue	Center for Creative Photography, UA Museum of Art
Main; Gate	University Boulevard & Tyndall Avenue	Sun Tran: 1, 6 Main Gate, Tyndall Avenue	Centennial Hall, Arizona Historical Society, Arizona State Museum
4th Avenue	University Boulevard & 3rd Avenue	University Bike Boulevard	Rogue Theatre
4th Avenue	4th Avenue & 4th/5th Streets	4th Avenue Bike Blvd.	
4th Avenue	4th Avenue & 6th/7th Streets	Sun Tran: 3	
4th Avenue	4th Avenue & 9th Streets	Golf Links-Aviation Path	
4th Avenue	4th Avenue Underpass		
Downtown	Plaza Centro (eastbound only)	Centro	Rialto Theatre, Historic Tucson Depot, Southern Arizona Transportation Museum, Hotel Congress
Downtown	Broadway Boulevard & 6th Avenue (eastbound); Congress Street & 6th Avenue (westbound)	Sun Tran: 1–4, 6–8, 10, 12, 16, 18, 19, 21–23, 25, 421; Sun Express: 102, 103, 105, 107, 109, 110; Amtrak: Sunset Ltd., Texas Eagle; Depot Plaza, Pennington St.	Ronstadt Transit Center, Children's Museum Tucson, Armory Park
Downtown	Broadway Boulevard & Stone Avenue (eastbound); Congress Street & Stone Avenue (westbound)	Main Library	Fox Tucson Theatre, Saint Augustine Cathedral, Joel D. Valdez Main Library, Downtown History Museum, Scottish Rite Cathedral, Temple of Music and Art
Downtown	Broadway Boulevard & Church Avenue (eastbound); Congress Street & Church Avenue (westbound)	Sun Tran: 1, 2, 6–8, 12, 21, 22, 25	Pima County Courthouse, Presidio San Augustin del Tucson, Tucson City Hall, Tucson Arena, Leo Rich Theatre
Downtown	Congress Street & Granada Avenue	Sun Express: 101, 102, 104, 108, 110; Hotel Arizona, City/State	Tucson Music Hall, Sosa-Carrillo-Fremont House, DeConcini Federal Courthouse, Tucson Museum of Art
Downtown	Granada Avenue & Cushing Street	Liberty-10th Avenue Bikeway; Greyhound; Tucson Convention Center surface lots	Tucson Convention Center
Downtown	Interstate 10 Underpass		
Mercado	Cushing Street & Frontage Road	The Loop (Santa Cruz River Park)	
Mercado	Luis Gutierrez Bridge		
Mercado	Cushing Street & [Avenida del] Convento (westbound)		
Mercado	Convento & Congress Street	Sun Tran: 21, 22	Mercado San Augustin, El Rio Community Health Center

Stops listed from east to west; district names and coloration taken from official Sun Link route map.

== Service ==
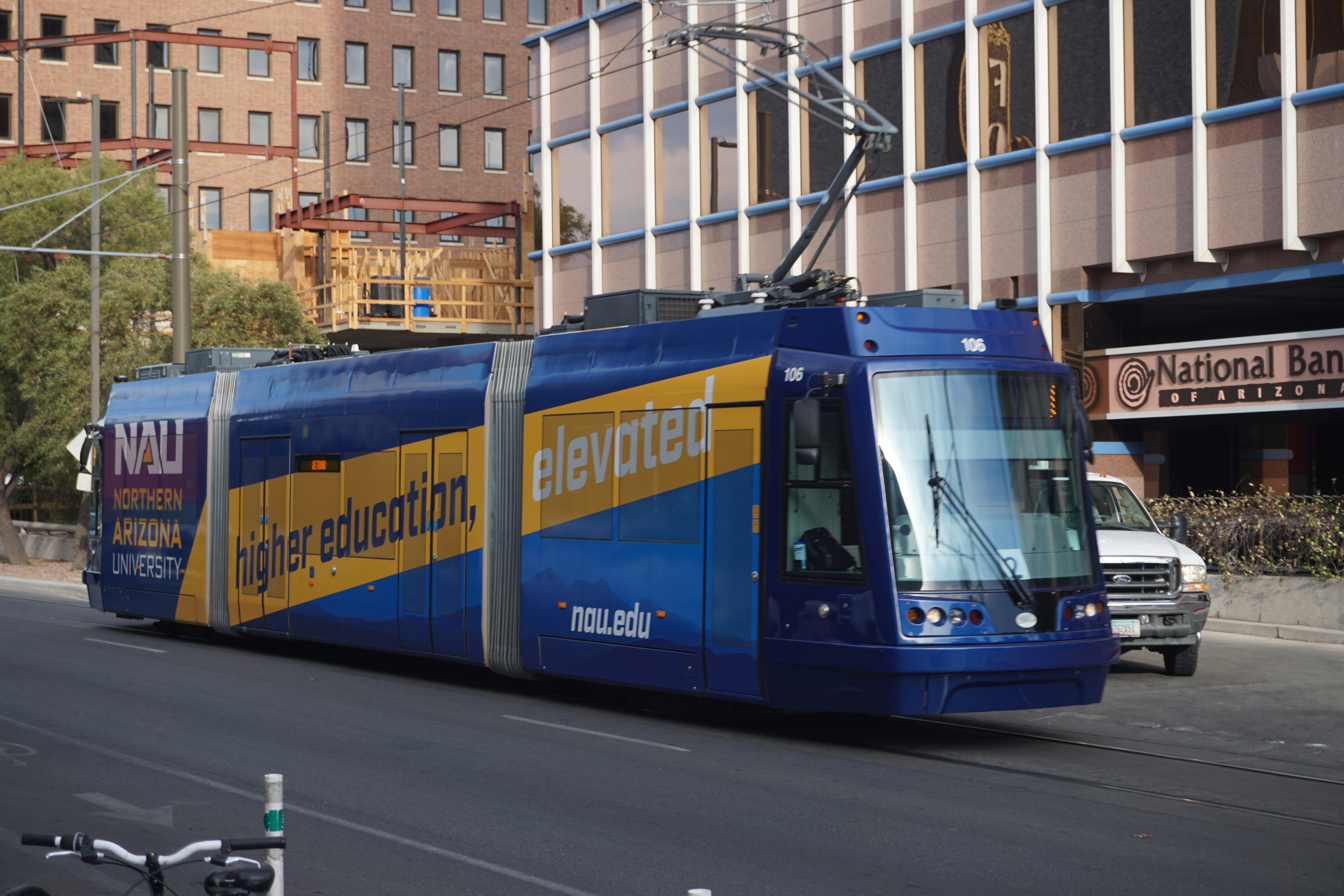
Sun Link streetcar

	Mon–Wed	Thu-Fri	Saturday	Sunday
7 am–8 am	15	15		
8 am–9 am	15	15	30	30
9 am–10 am	10	10	30	30
10 am–6 pm	10	10	15	20
6 pm–8 pm	15	15	15	30
8 pm–10 pm	15	15	15	
10 pm–12 am		15	15	
12 am–2 am		30	30	

Headway in minutes

Weekday service runs every ten minutes during peak hours and every fifteen minutes mornings and evenings. Saturday morning and Sunday service runs every twenty or thirty minutes. Half-hour late-night service provided only while the University of Arizona is in session runs through 2 am on Thursday, Friday, and Saturday nights. Travel time from one end of the line to the other is approximately 30 minutes.

Since mid-March 2020, fare is free. Previously a SunGO pass or fare card, available at the Ronstadt Transit Center, online, and at various retail locations, must have been purchased prior to boarding; payment was not accepted by Sun Link drivers. 24-hour passes used to be available for $4.50 from ticket vending machines located on all Sun Link platforms, payable either in exact change or by credit. Passengers used to record payment by scanning fare cards at electronic validators after boarding.

== Rolling stock ==
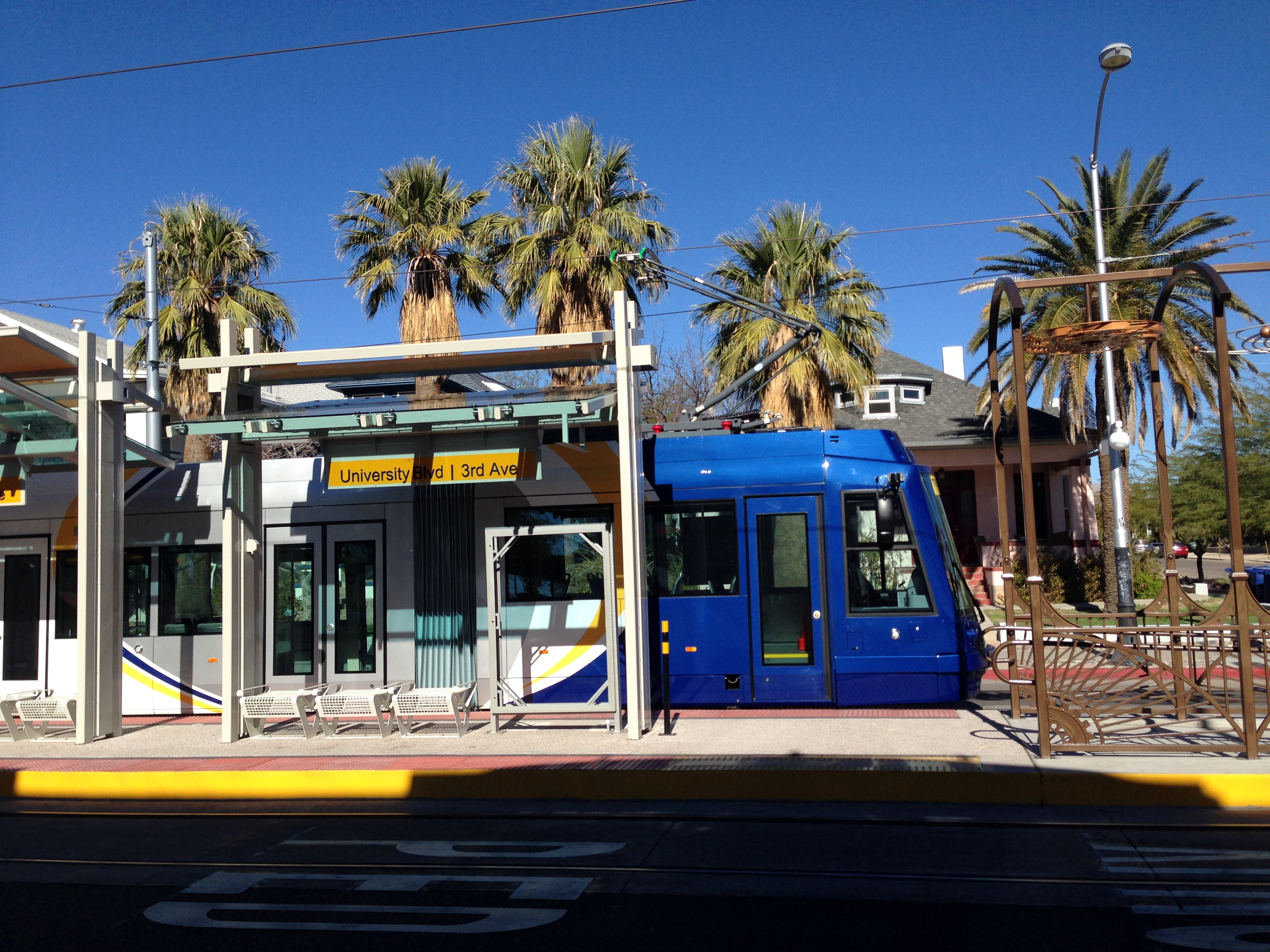
A Tucson Sun Link streetcar at the 3rd and University station.

Sun Link maintains a fleet of eight United Streetcar 200s, using up to six cars at once. These are numbered 101 to 108. The streetcar is 66 feet 1 inch (20.13 m) long, double-ended (bi-directional), and articulated into three sections. Its center section floor is at platform height for accessibility with two double-door entrances on each side. Each side has a third passenger door located behind the operator cab. Propulsion is provided by four 90 kW motors drawing power via pantograph from an overhead wire. The streetcar has a maximum speed of 43.5 mph (70 km/h) and a capacity of 156 passengers (29 seated and 127 standing).

The United 200 is largely identical to the 100 model produced for systems in Portland and Washington, D.C., the only major difference being that the 200 is equipped with upgraded air-conditioning. The design of the 100 model itself is based on the Czech-made Škoda 10 T.

Tucson placed a $26 million order with United for seven cars in June 2010. An eighth was ordered for an additional $3.6 million in July 2012 in order to satisfy FTA requirements for a second spare. United's first model 200 car arrived in Tucson by flatbed truck on August 30, 2013. Delays in streetcar production pushed Sun Link's projected start of service from a forecast of late 2013 as of the start of construction to July 2014. Tucson officials notified United Streetcar in May 2013 of their intention to assess contractual damages for late delivery. United's parent company, Vigor Works, formerly Oregon Iron Works, settled with the city in 2016 for $1.7 million to be paid in additional parts and labor.

== See also ==
- Light rail in the United States
- Old Pueblo Trolley
- Streetcars in North America
