= Arizona Eastern Railway =

Class III railroad

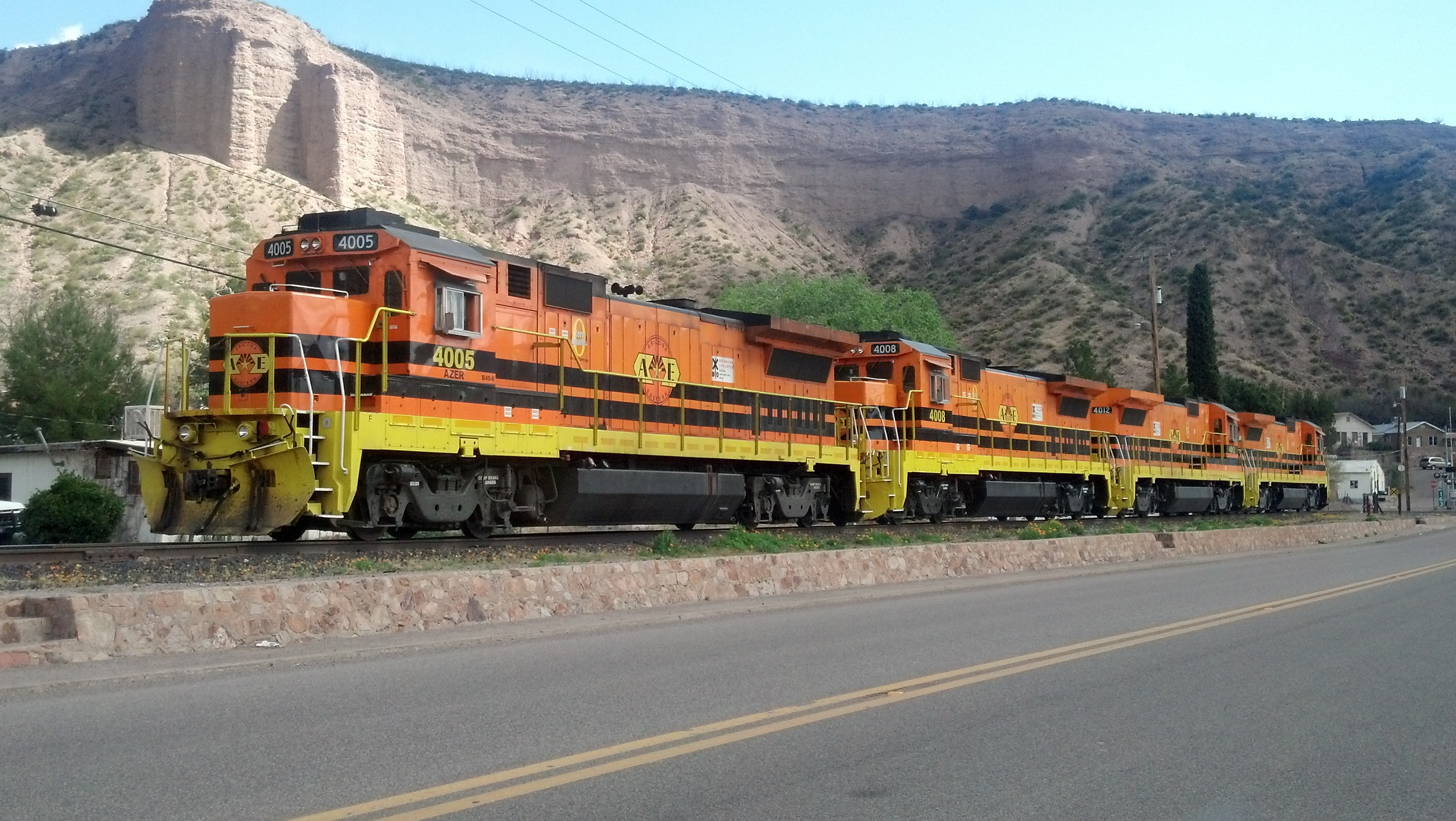
- Four GE B40-8 diesel locomotives of Arizona Eastern Railway in Clifton, AZ, in March 2015

Overview
- Headquarters: Claypool, Arizona
- Reporting mark: AZER
- Locale: Arizona
- Dates of operation: 1988–

Technical
- Track gauge: 4 ft 8 1/2 in (1,435 mm)

Other
- Website: www.gwrr.com

The Arizona Eastern Railway (reporting mark AZER) is a Class III railroad that operates 206 miles (332 km) of railroad between Clifton, Arizona, and Miami, Arizona, in the United States. This includes trackage rights over the Union Pacific Railroad between Lordsburg, New Mexico, and Bowie, Arizona. The railroad serves the copper mining region of southeastern Arizona, and the agricultural Gila River Valley. Primary commodities are sulfuric acid, copper concentrate, copper anode and cathode, and copper rod and other copper processing materials. AZER also handles minerals, chemicals, building supplies and lumber.

The railroad has a transload location at Globe, Arizona as well as one interchange, with Union Pacific in Lordsburg, New Mexico.

== History ==
What is now the Arizona Eastern Railway was chartered as the Gila Valley, Globe and Northern Railway (GVGN) on January 5, 1885. Before completion to Globe in 1899, the GVGN came under the control of the Arizona Eastern Railroad (AE). The Arizona Eastern was leased by the Southern Pacific Railroad (SP) in 1905 and merged into the SP system in 1924. SP sold the Bowie – Miami line to Kyle Railroad in 1988. Kyle was purchased by shortline holding company StatesRail in 1995, which was eventually purchased by RailAmerica in 2001. RailAmerica sold the railroad to Permian Basin Railways, a subsidiary of Iowa Pacific Holdings, in December, 2004.

Of historical note, the Gila Valley Globe & Northern Railroad's first locomotive, apparently GVGN #1, was purchased from the Central Pacific Railroad, originally #1195 (Jupiter). The locomotive was the Central Pacific locomotive that met with Union Pacific No. 119 at Promontory Summit on May 10, 1869, for the driving of the golden spike, commemorating the completion of the First transcontinental railroad. Despite its historical significance, in 1909 the GVGN, by then controlled by Central Pacific successor Southern Pacific, sold No. 1 for $1000 as scrap.

In 2006, Arizona Eastern announced the construction of a new 10-mile (16 km) spur from Safford to the new Safford Mine of Freeport-McMoRan Corporation, north of Safford. The mine opened in 2008.

In 2008, AZER purchased the Clifton Subdivision from Union Pacific. The Clifton subdivision serves the Morenci Mine near Clifton, Arizona, and interchanges with UP at Lordsburg, New Mexico.

In December 2008, weekend excursion service under the name Copper Spike began operating from Globe to the Apache Gold Hotel Casino near San Carlos. Trains operated four daily round-trips through the winter and spring, on Thursdays through Sundays. The Copper Spike excursion train did not resume operation for a 2011–2012 season due to the transfer in ownership.

On 2 August 2011, Genesee & Wyoming Inc. announced that it planned to purchase the Arizona Eastern from Iowa Pacific for US$90.1 million, with the deal expected to be completed by the end of the year. The deal was closed on 1 September 2011.

== Current operation ==
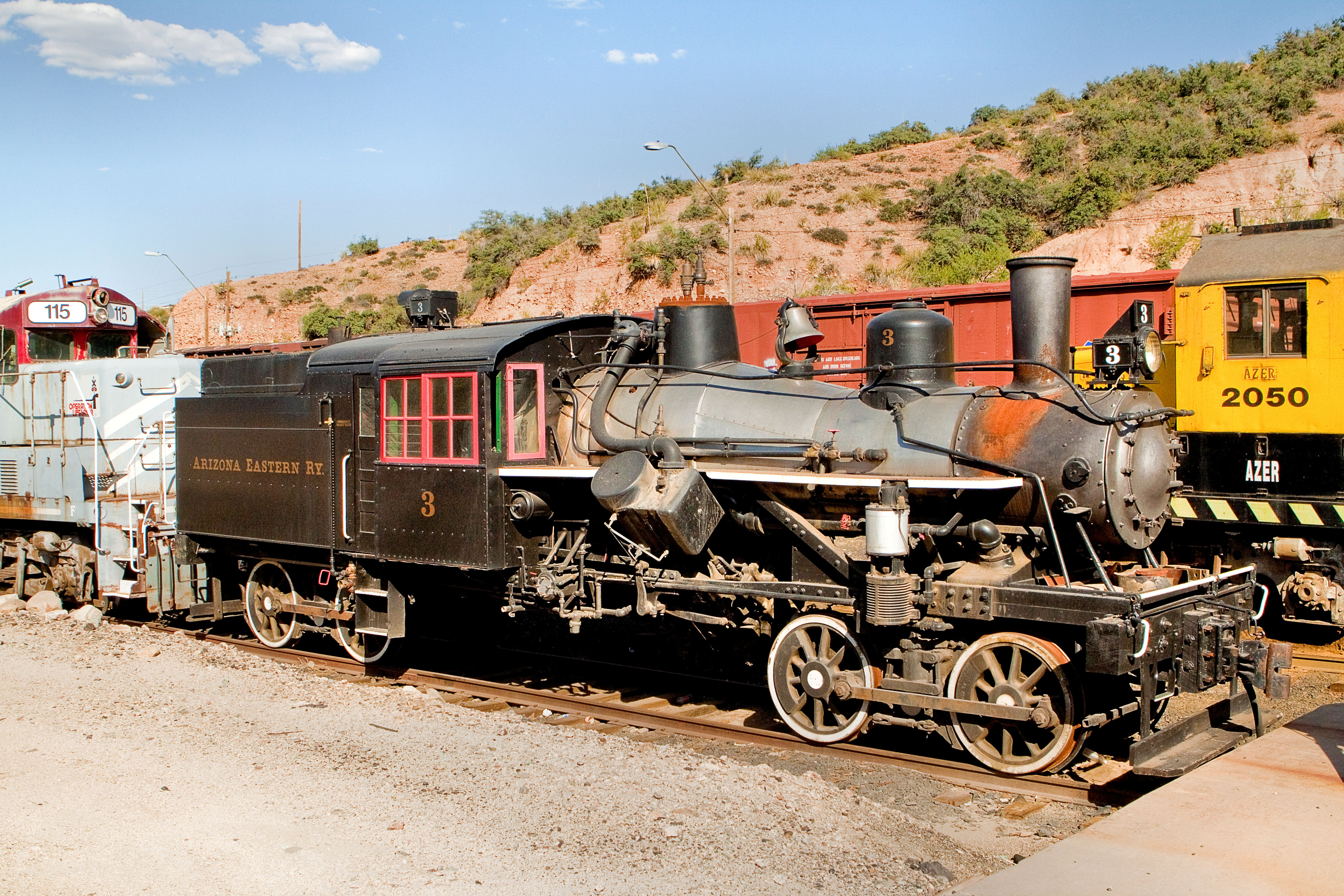
A Heisler locomotive in AZER's railyard in Miami, Arizona

=== Cities served ===
- Clifton, AZ
- Guthrie, AZ
- Duncan, AZ
- Lordsburg, NM
- Bowie, AZ
- Solomon, AZ
- Safford, AZ

freight dock

- Pima, AZ
- San Carlos, AZ
- Globe, AZ
- Claypool, AZ

freight dock

=== Rolling stock ===
The following are locomotives operated by the Arizona Eastern:

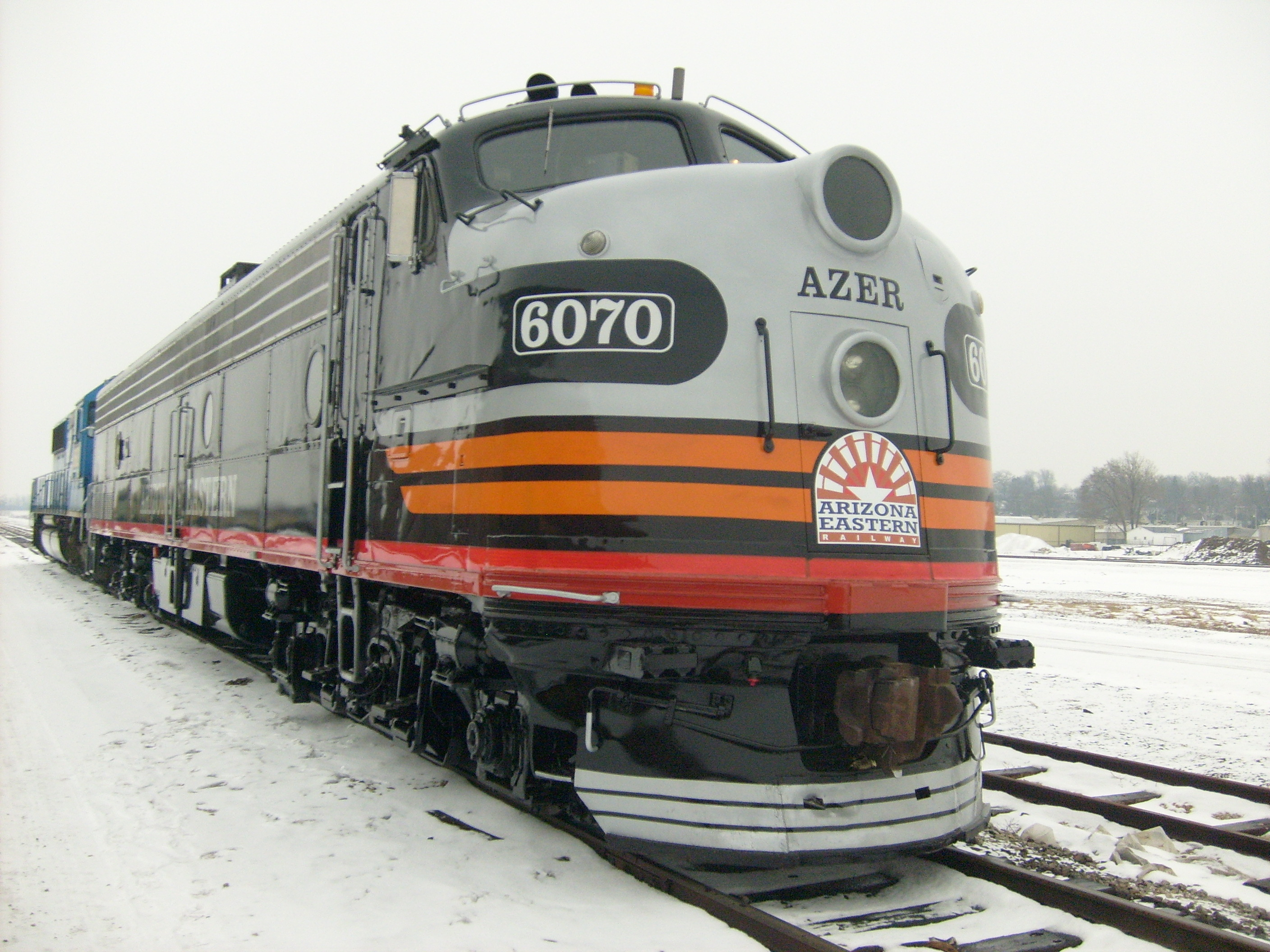
An E8 locomotive which was used on the Copper Spike train in 2010

- EMD SD90MAC43
- EMD GP7
- EMD GP9
- EMD GP20
- EMD GP35
- EMD SD40-2
- EMD SD90MAC
- EMD SW9
- EMD SW1200
- GE B40-8
- GE B39-8E
- EMD E8A

Arizona Eastern previously operated AZER #6070, an EMD E8 locomotive. Built for the Chicago and North Western Railroad as CNW #5029B in June 1953, it pulled passenger trains for its railroad including Chicago commuter train service. It was repainted in a scheme reminiscent of Southern Pacific's "Black Widow" livery, since Arizona Eastern was owned by Southern Pacific. As of August 2011, the locomotive was transferred to the Saratoga and North Creek Railroad.
