= United Verde & Pacific Railway =

Former railroad in Yavapai County, Arizona

Overview
- Headquarters: Jerome
- Locale: Yavapai County, Arizona, United States
- Dates of operation: 1895–1920
- Predecessor: none

Technical
- Track gauge: 3 ft (914 mm)
- Length: 26.3 mi (42.3 km)

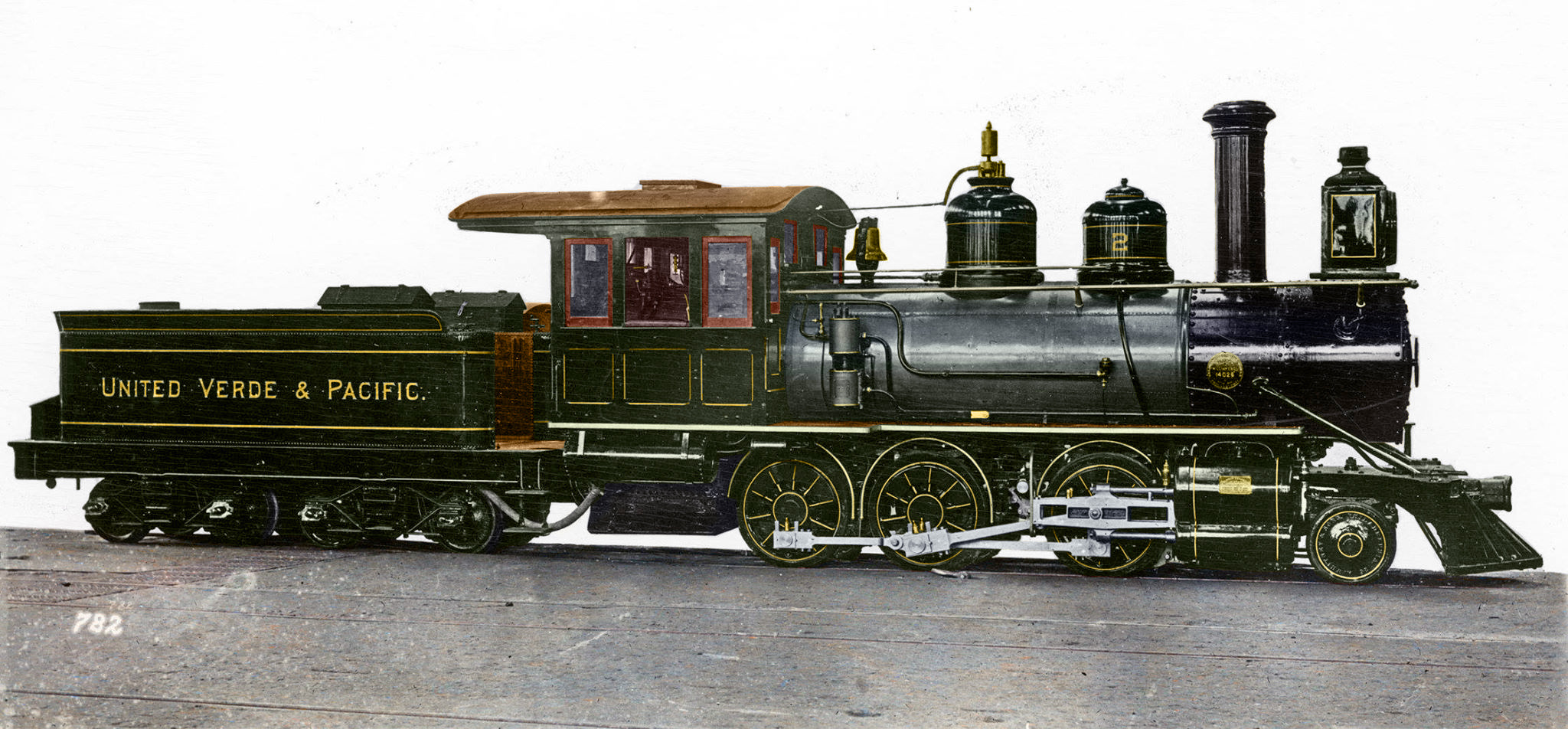
Colorized builders photo of UV&P#2

The United Verde and Pacific Railway was a 3 ft (914 mm) narrow gauge railroad that operated from 1895 to 1920 in what became Yavapai County in the U.S. state of Arizona. William A. Clark built the 26-mile (42 km) line to link his copper mine and smelter in Jerome to an existing branch of the Santa Fe Railway system. Clark eventually replaced the line with three 4 ft 8 1/2 in (1,435 mm) standard gauge rail lines after building a new smelter and company town in Clarkdale.

== History ==
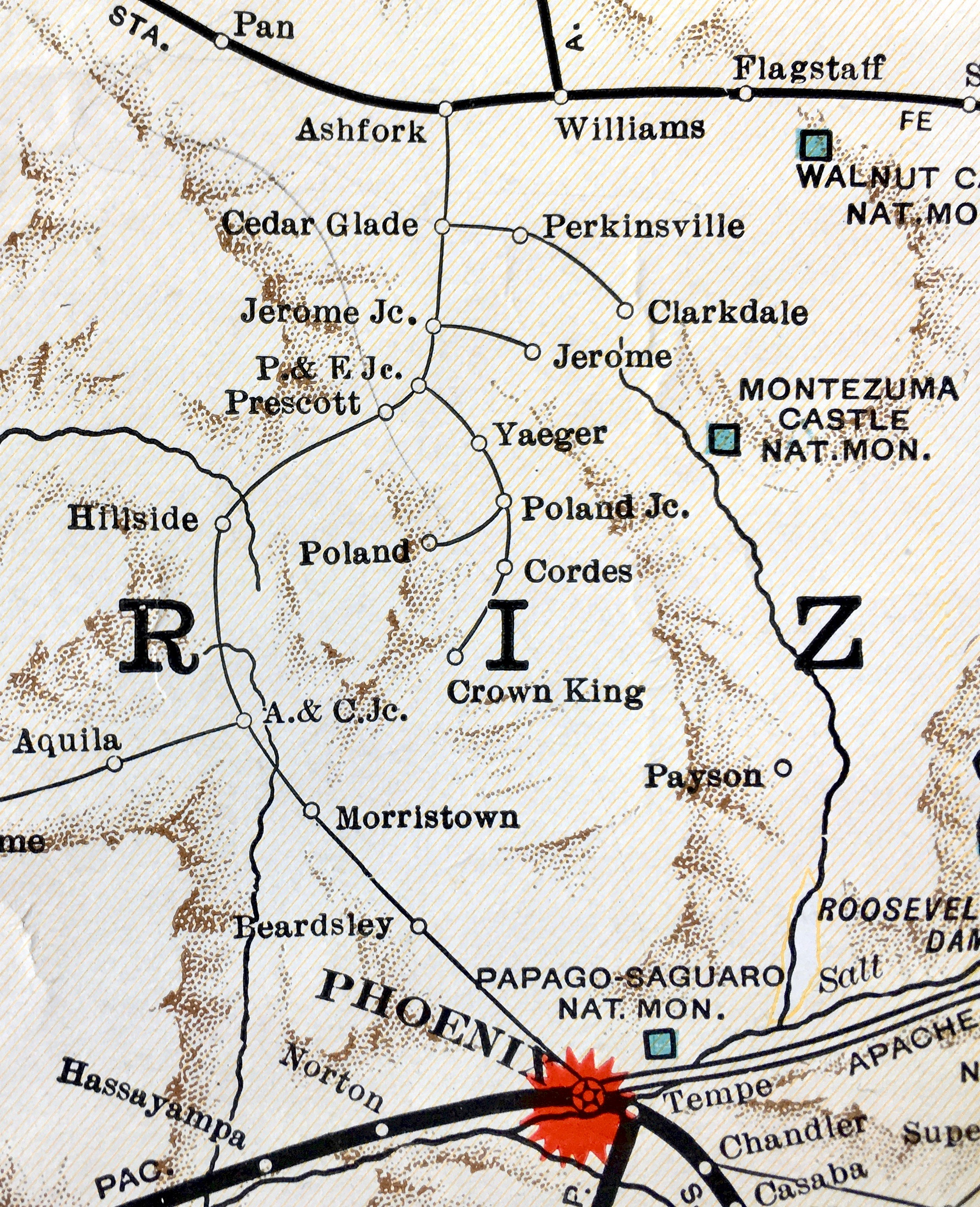
Route in 1930

Early owners of the United Verde copper mine in Jerome relied on mule-drawn wagons to transport material to and from the mine. In 1882, the Atlantic and Pacific Railroad (A&P) had completed a railway line across northern Arizona, and a north–south 60-mile (97 km) wagon road was built between Jerome and Ash Fork, where it met the railroad. By 1886, an investor, Thomas S. Bullock, had built another line, the Prescott and Arizona Central (P&AC), from Seligman on the A&P line south to Prescott. Eugene Jerome—for whom Jerome is named—and the other owners of the United Verde mine switched to shipping about 30 miles (48 km) west to the P&AC, still by wagon. This arrangement briefly succeeded, but in 1887 the United Verde mine closed after the price of copper fell, and Bullock's line faced serious problems with debt, mismanagement, and failing infrastructure. In 1892, Santa Fe Railway interests built a branch line from Ash Fork to Prescott and forced Bullock's P&AC line out of business. The new line, the Santa Fe, Prescott and Phoenix Railway (SFP&P), was financially sound and well-managed.

William Andrews Clark, a wealthy Montana businessman and later a U.S. Senator, acquired a controlling share in the United Verde mine in 1888. Aware of the mine's potential and of the increasing demand for copper for use in electrical distribution systems, Clark decided to connect his mine by rail to the SFP&P. He paid out of his own fortune the entire $600,000 it took to complete the United Verde & Pacific Railway. The line was finished in 1894, and scheduled service began in 1895.

Unquenchable fires that began in the United Verde mine in 1894 eventually led Clark to convert operations in Jerome to open-pit mining. To accomplish this, Clark had to move the smelter complex, which had been built directly above the mine. In a series of projects beginning in 1911, Clark moved the surface plant in Jerome; built a smelter and company town, Clarkdale, in the Verde Valley below Jerome; and financed construction of three new standard gauge railroads—the Verde Tunnel and Smelter line and the Hopewell Haulage Tunnel to carry ore to Clarkdale, and the Verde Valley Railroad, to link Clarkdale to the Santa Fe Railway system at Drake. By 1919, the Verde Tunnel and Smelter line was extended to Jerome, and the United Verde & Pacific became completely obsolete. Its last train left the station in May 1920.

== Tracks ==
Clark chose to build a narrow gauge line along which the rails of the track were 3 ft (914 mm) apart rather than 4 ft 8 1/2 in (1,435 mm) standard gauge. The mountainous terrain between Jerome and Jerome Junction figured heavily in the decision as did cost factors. The narrow gauge tracks required less steel, less wood for crossties, less cutting and filling to lay track around sharp curves, and the rolling stock could consist of small, relatively inexpensive locomotives and rail cars. Difficulties associated with the gauge choice involved transferring loads, either by dumping or by using physical labor, between the narrow gauge United Verde & Pacific and the standard gauge Santa Fe, Prescott and Phoenix at Jerome Junction.

Track elevations varied from 4,616 feet (1,407 m) at Jerome Junction to 5,939 feet (1,810 m) at First View, the railway's highest point, on Woodchute Mountain in the Black Hills. From the summit, the line dropped to 5,600 feet (1,700 m) at the smelter in Jerome. The maximum gradient on the line was 3 percent, on both sides of the summit. The line went around 186 curves; maximum curvature was 24 degrees.

== Rolling stock ==
Listed as a Class II Common Carrier, the line carried freight and passengers. Clark bought all-new equipment. Baldwin Locomotive Works of Philadelphia built the line's 10 locomotives, all with a 2-6-0 wheel arrangement. Locomotives No. 1 through No. 4 were steam locomotives originally built to burn coal, but were modified in 1903 to burn fuel oil. Clark bought locomotives No. 4 through No. 8, as well as replacements for No. 2 and No. 3 in 1905 through 1907. The original Nos. 2 and 3 were destroyed in wrecks.

Company records from 1915 listed 147 rail cars of various types. These included 1 private coach, 4 combination coach and baggage cars holding 26 passengers each, 10 boxcars, 23 coal cars, 18 ore cars, 48 flatcars, 33 stock cars, 6 oil cars, and 4 outfit cars. The private coach was reserved exclusively for Clark.

== Terminals ==
A complex of sidings, switching yards, and railroad buildings made up the community of Jerome Junction. These included a roundhouse, turning wye, equipment to transfer loads between the narrow gauge and standard gauge lines, livestock pens, water tanks, storage buildings, and a joint station platform and station between the two lines. The community also had homes, the Junction Hotel, two saloons, and a school that doubled as a church.

The Jerome smelter complex at the east end of the line included multiple sidings and spurs; bins for ore, lime, coke and coal; a turntable; offices for the railway and the smelter, and depots. A steam-powered hoist could lower rail cars down an 890-foot (270 m) incline to warehouses that were 50 feet (15 m) lower than the main track.

Over time Jerome had three railroad depots. The first, at the end of the track, operated from 1895 to 1905 when a mine collapse caused the surface near the depot to sink away. The second, at the new end of the track, was open until 1917, when the mine was converted to an open pit. The third, at the Jerome Wye at milepost 24.8, operated until the line closed in 1920.

== See also ==
- List of defunct Arizona railroads

== Works cited ==
- Wahmann, Russell (1983). Narrow Gauge to Jerome: The United Verde & Pacific Railway. Jerome, Arizona: Jerome Historical Society. ISBN 0-87108-754-5.
