= Clarkdale Arizona Central Railroad =

Short-line railroad

Overview
- Headquarters: Clarkdale, Arizona
- Reporting mark: AZCR
- Locale: Central Arizona
- Dates of operation: 1989–present
- Predecessor: Atchison, Topeka and Santa Fe Railway

Technical
- Track gauge: 4 ft 8 1/2 in (1,435 mm) standard gauge

Other
- Website: www.clarkdaleazcentral.com

Arizona Central Railroad

The Clarkdale Arizona Central Railroad (reporting mark AZCR) is an Arizona short-line railroad that operates from a connection with the BNSF Railway's Phoenix Subdivision at Drake, Arizona. The Drake Switching Company also operates a connection between the BNSF and the AZCR in Drake. The AZCR runs 37.8 miles (60.8 km) from Drake to Clarkdale, Arizona. An excursion train also runs on the line through Verde Canyon and is operated by the same owners under the Verde Canyon Railroad. The AZCR is owned by David L. Durbano but as of spring 2025, it was under contract to be sold, pending approval from the FRA and Surface Transportation Board.

== Traffic ==
The AZCR handles 1,500 cars per year of inbound coal, coke, lime, bauxite, and fly ash to the Phoenix Cement Company and shipping outbound cement. The Verde Canyon Railroad carries 100,000 passengers per year (2013 figure).

== History ==
=== Verde Valley Railway ===
From 1913 to 1989 the line was operated by the Atchison, Topeka and Santa Fe Railway (Santa Fe Railway). On November 17, 1911, the Verde Valley Railway was chartered as a non-operating subsidiary of the Santa Fe Railway. Construction from Cedar Glade (west of Drake) to Clarkdale, a distance of 38 miles (61 km), was immediately commenced on February 13, 1912, and was completed on February 1, 1913, at a total cost of $1,286,061. It was built to support the United Verde Mine at Jerome, Arizona. On December 31, 1942, the Verde Valley was conveyed to the Santa Fe Railway by deed.

On April 14, 1989, the Santa Fe Railway sold the Clarkdale branch to David L. Durbano. The new railroads were named the Clarkdale Arizona Central Railroad for freight and the Verde Canyon Railroad for passenger service. Passenger service resumed in November 1990.

== Motive power ==
The AZCR has seven locomotives that were all built by originally by EMD. The railroad has one EMD GP7 (AZCR 2164), two EMD GP9 (AZCR 3413 and AZCR 2279), a pair of former ICG Paducah-rebuild GP26's (2601 and 2602) recently acquired from the Cimarron Valley Railroad (2019), and a pair of EMD FP7s (1510 and 1512, used to power the excursion). The vintage FP7 diesel locomotives are two of only ten remaining in operation in North America. They were originally built for the Alaska Railroad in 1953 by the Electro-Motive Division of General Motors in La Grange, Illinois.

| Locomotive model | Road number |
|---|---|
| EMD FP7 | 1510 |
| EMD FP7 | 1512 |
| EMD GP7U | 2164 |
| EMD GP26 | 2601 |
| EMD GP26 | 2602 |
| EMD GP9 | 3413 |
| EMD GP9 | 2279 |

== Route ==
The route is nestled between two national forests and adjacent to a designated wilderness area, follows the Verde River the entire way and features a 680-foot (210 m) long tunnel and many bridges.

- Drake – BNSF Phoenix Subdivision
- Mack – does not appear in timetable.
- Bear – named because a bear was shot there during construction.
- Perkinsville – a ghost town
- Sycamore
- Clarkdale
