= Verde Village, Arizona =

CDP in Yavapai County, Arizona

- CDP
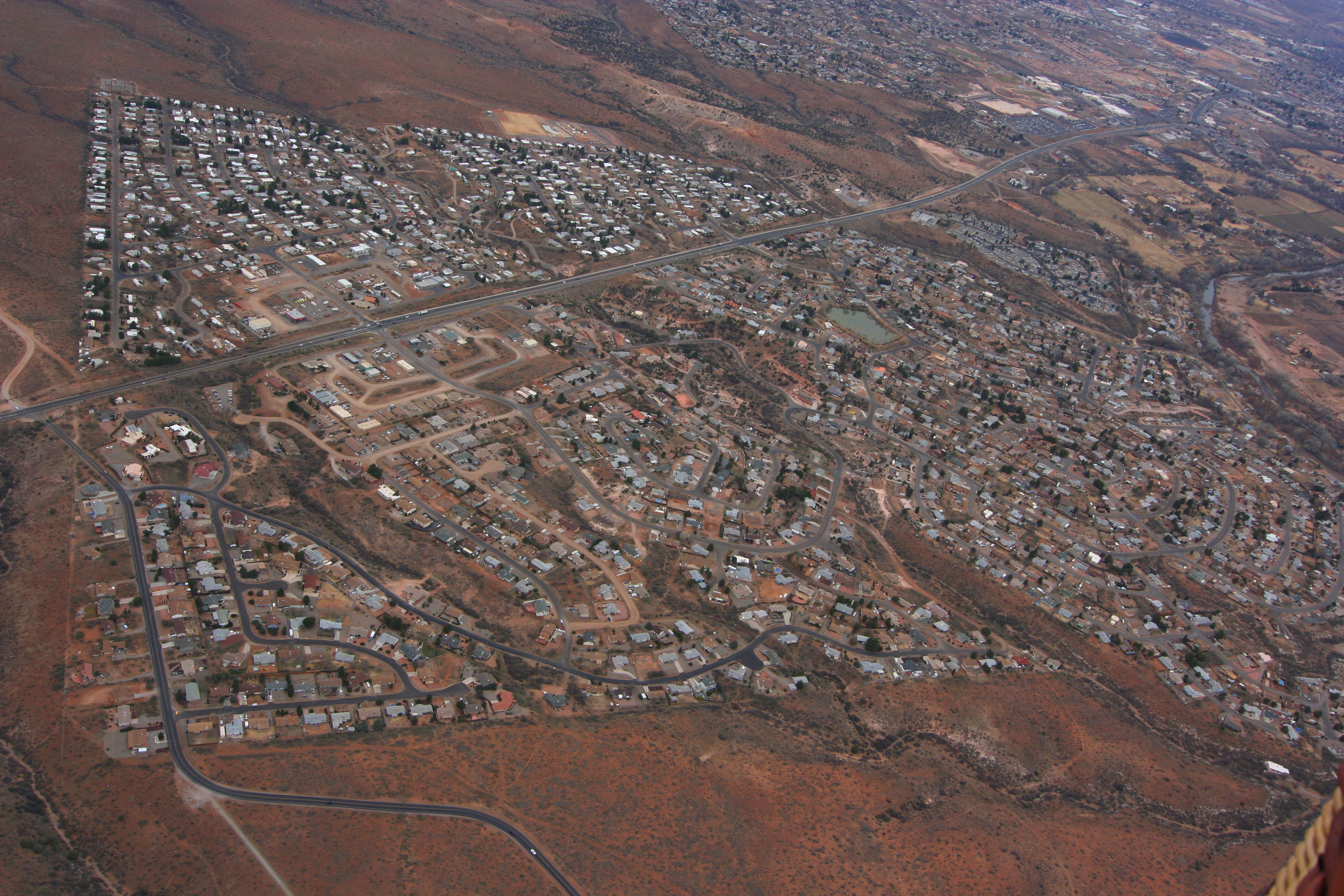
- Verde Village as seen from a hot air balloon, 2005. Cottonwood and the Verde River are at top right. View is to the west.

- Location of Verde Village in Yavapai County, Arizona.

- Location in the United States
- Coordinates: 34°43′50″N 112°00′23″W
- Country: United States
- State: Arizona
- County: Yavapai

Area
  - Total: 6.94 sq mi (17.98 km^{2})
  - Land: 6.94 sq mi (17.98 km^{2})
  - Water: 0 sq mi (0.00 km^{2})
- Elevation: 3,271 ft (997 m)

Population (2020)
  - Total: 12,019
  - Density: 1,730.9/sq mi (668.29/km^{2})
- Time zone: UTC-7 (MST)
- ZIP codes: 86326
- FIPS code: 04-16485
- GNIS feature ID: 2407671

Verde Village is a census-designated place (CDP) in Yavapai County, Arizona, United States. The population was 11,605 at the 2010 census. It is a retirement and bedroom community for Cottonwood.

== History and economy ==
Verde Village was developed in 1970 as a retirement community; there were eight units in the original subdivision, Verde Village Units One through Eight. About two-thirds of Verde Village residents are retired.

== Geography ==
According to the United States Census Bureau, the CDP has a total area of 8.8 square miles (23 km^{2}), all land.

== Demographics ==
Historical population
Census	Pop.	Note	%±
2000	10,610		—
2010	11,605		9.4%
2020	12,019		3.6%
U.S. Decennial Census

=== 2020 census ===
As of the 2020 census, Verde Village had a population of 12,019. The median age was 45.8 years. 21.4% of residents were under the age of 18 and 24.5% of residents were 65 years of age or older. For every 100 females there were 99.3 males, and for every 100 females age 18 and over there were 96.6 males age 18 and over.

99.1% of residents lived in urban areas, while 0.9% lived in rural areas.

There were 4,735 households in Verde Village, of which 25.2% had children under the age of 18 living in them. Of all households, 46.5% were married-couple households, 18.3% were households with a male householder and no spouse or partner present, and 26.2% were households with a female householder and no spouse or partner present. About 26.2% of all households were made up of individuals and 14.9% had someone living alone who was 65 years of age or older.

There were 5,045 housing units, of which 6.1% were vacant. The homeowner vacancy rate was 2.2% and the rental vacancy rate was 5.8%.

Racial composition as of the 2020 census
Race	Number	Percent
White	8,968	74.6%
Black or African American	87	0.7%
American Indian and Alaska Native	194	1.6%
Asian	93	0.8%
Native Hawaiian and Other Pacific Islander	22	0.2%
Some other race	1,113	9.3%
Two or more races	1,542	12.8%
Hispanic or Latino (of any race)	2,965	24.7%

=== 2000 census ===
As of the 2000 census, there were 10,610 people, 4,071 households, and 2,988 families residing in the CDP. The population density was 1,210.5 inhabitants per square mile (467.4/km^{2}). There were 4,290 housing units at an average density of 489.4 per square mile (189.0/km^{2}). The racial makeup of the CDP was 91.1% White, 0.3% Black or African American, 1.2% Native American, 0.5% Asian, 0.1% Pacific Islander, 4.4% from other races, and 2.4% from two or more races. 11.2% of the population were Hispanic or Latino of any race.

There were 4,071 households, out of which 29.6% had children under the age of 18 living with them, 60.2% were married couples living together, 9.8% had a female householder with no husband present, and 26.6% were non-families. 21.1% of all households consisted of one individual and 10.0% were an individual 65 years or older. The average household size was 2.53 and the average family size was 2.92.

In the CDP, the population was spread out, with 24.6% under the age of 18, 5.9% from 18 to 24, 23.8% from 25 to 44, 23.9% from 45 to 64, and 21.9% who were 65 years of age or older. The median age was 42 years. For every 100 females, there were 91.4 males. For every 100 females age 18 and over, there were 87.1 males.

The median income for a household in the CDP was $35,075, and the median income for a family was $38,596. Males had a median income of $29,129 versus $21,773 for females. The per capita income for the CDP was $16,734. About 6.7% of families and 8.7% of the population were below the poverty line, including 12.3% of those under age 18 and 4.8% of those age 65 or over.

== Education ==
It is in the Cottonwood-Oak Creek School District and the Mingus Union High School District.
