= Perkinsville, Arizona =

Ghost town in Yavapai County, Arizona

- Populated place
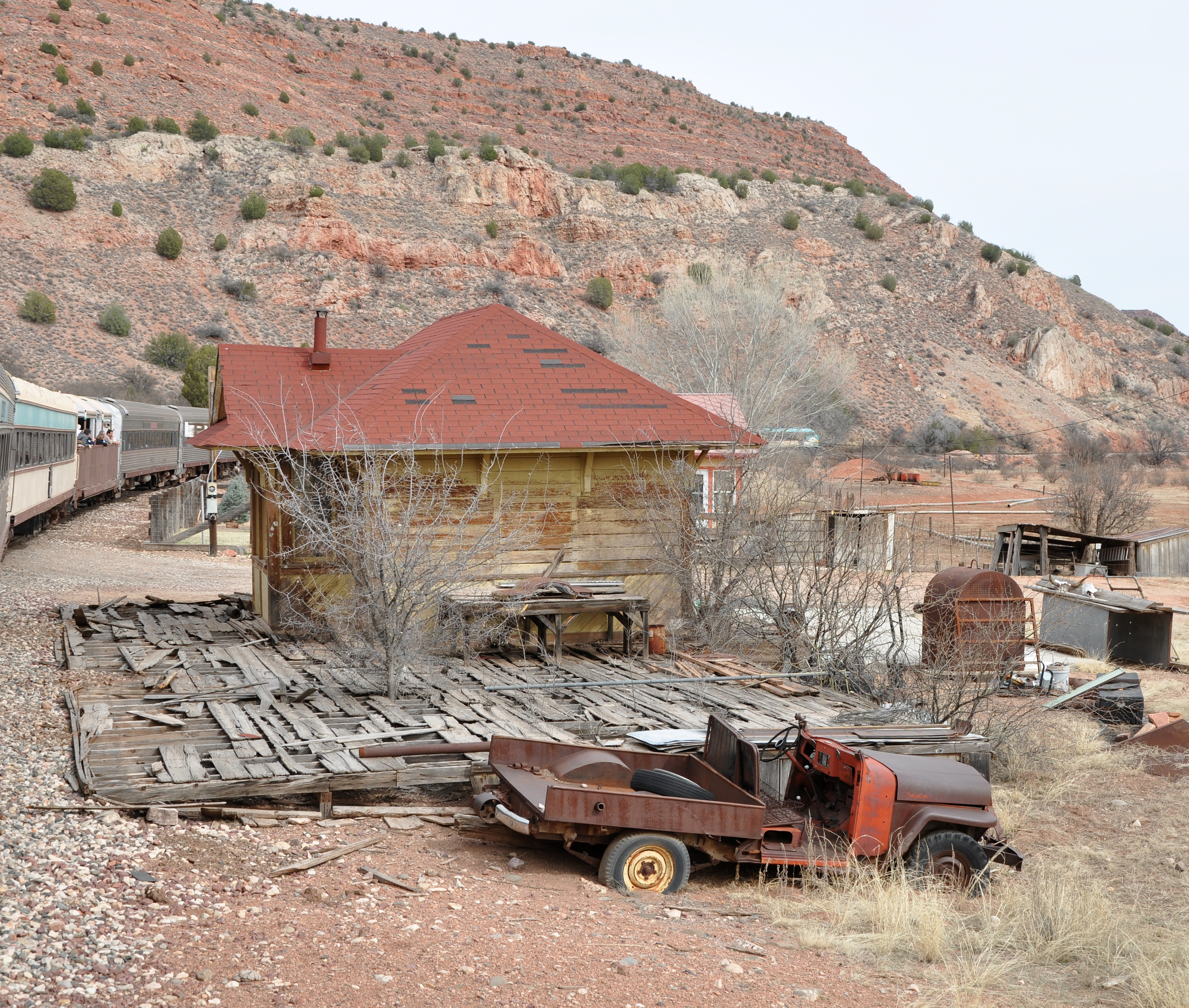
- Abandoned train station

- Location within the state of Arizona Perkinsville, Arizona (the United States)
- Coordinates: 34°54′06″N 112°11′29″W
- Country: United States
- State: Arizona
- County: Yavapai
- Elevation: 3,826 ft (1,166 m)
- Time zone: UTC-7 (MST)
- GNIS feature ID: 32803

Perkinsville is a populated place in Yavapai County, in Arizona, United States. It is a hamlet about 0.5 miles (0.8 km) from the Perkinsville Bridge over the Verde River.

The Verde Canyon Railroad, a passenger excursion line, runs between Clarkdale and Perkinsville on the tracks of the Clarkdale Arizona Central Railroad, a shortline. The excursion train engines disconnect at Perkinsville and move along a siding to reconnect at the opposite end of the train for the return trip to Clarkdale. The track through Perkinsville is also used to haul freight between Clarkdale and Drake, on the Clarkdale Arizona Central Railroad.

== History ==
Perkinsville is named for M.A. Perkins, who established a cattle ranch here in 1900. In 1912, the shortline, financed by William A. Clark to service his copper smelter in Clarkdale and his copper mine in Jerome, opened a station in Perkinsville. The railroad buildings included a depot, water tower, and the station master's house. Nearby were a limestone quarry and kiln for producing lime, used as a flux in the Clarkdale smelter.

Briefly in the early 20th century Perkinsville supported an estimated 10 to 12 families. It had a small school, general store, section house, and post office. The smelter closure in the early 1950s eliminated the need for the quarry and kiln, and the advent of diesel locomotives eliminated the need for the Perkinsville water stop. The hamlet soon became a ghost town, used in the 1960s as a filming location for scenes in How the West Was Won.

== Education ==
It is in the Cottonwood-Oak Creek School District.
