= Phoenix Subdivision =

Phoenix Subdivision may refer to:

- Phoenix Subdivision (BNSF Railway)
- Phoenix Subdivision (Union Pacific Railroad)
