= Jerome High School =

Jerome High School may refer to:

- Jerome High School (Dublin, Ohio)
- Jerome High School (Jerome, Idaho)
- Jerome High School (Arizona)
