= Cottonwood-Oak Creek School District =

School district in Yavapai County, Arizona

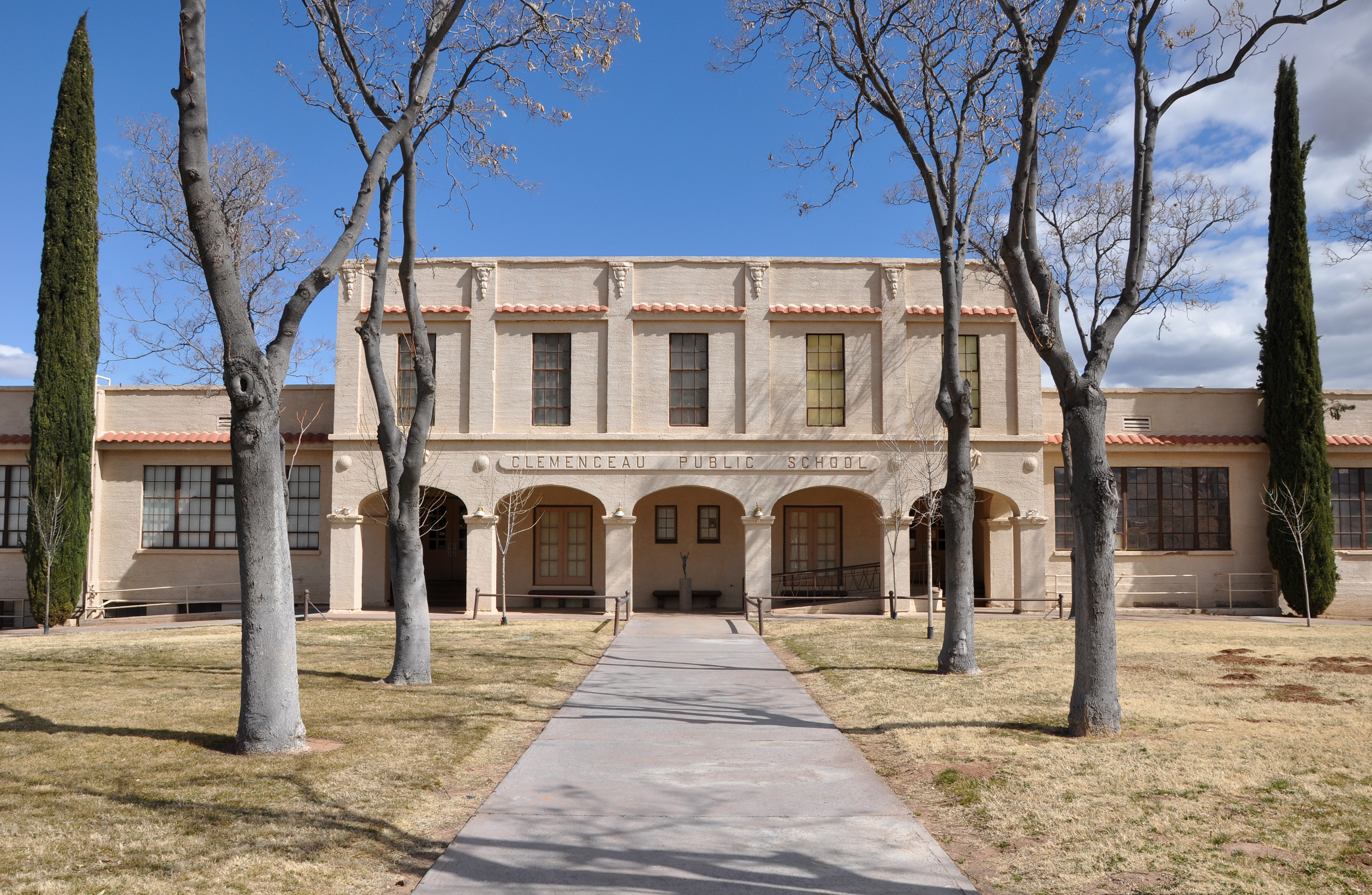
- District headquarters are in the Clemenceau Public School building, listed on the National Register of Historic Places

Address
- 1 North Willard Street Cottonwood, Arizona, 86326; United States

District information
- Type: Public
- Grades: PreK–12
- NCES District ID: 0402370

Students and staff
- Students: 1,887
- Teachers: 113.15
- Staff: 119.3
- Student–teacher ratio: 16.68

Other information
- Website: www.cocsd.us

The Cottonwood-Oak Creek School District No. 6 (COCSD) is a school district in Arizona, United States, headquartered in Cottonwood.

The school district is located in Yavapai County, and includes almost all of Cottonwood municipality, all of Cornville and Verde Village census-designated places, and portions of Clarkdale municipality. It also includes the unincorporated area of Perkinsville. Areas in the school district are also in Mingus Union High School District.

== History ==
In 1878, the first school in Cottonwood was established and became Yavapai County School District #6. The first teacher, Mrs. Rubottom, lived in an old adobe building built by soldiers from Camp Verde when they supervised the captured Yavapai and Apache on the Rio Verde Reservation until 1875.

As Cottonwood grew, land was deeded for a school (and cemetery) in 1892. The Cottonwood School opened in 1909 serving students from ages 6–17 who had to carry water from a well 1.4 miles away.

From 1917 to 1923 the Bungalow School educated students whose parents worked for the United Verde Extension's mine and smelter in the company town of Clemenceau. In 1923, a modern public school was built by James Douglas, owner of the United Verde Extension, for $100,000, which still proudly stands today! The Clemenceau School brought all the students from grades 1 through 9 of Cottonwood together. High School students attended Clarkdale High School until 1947 when the Clemenceau building became a high school. Elementary students attended school in buildings next to the high school.

In 1954, Oak Creek School in Cornville joined with Cottonwood to form Cottonwood-Oak Creek School District # 6. That same year Yavapai County students from Sedona joined the Cottonwood-Oak Creek School District.

In 1958 Cottonwood and Clark/Jerome School Districts merged their high schools to form Mingus Union High School due to declining enrollment. That same year the Willard School, a small school for grades 1–8 in the area of Bridgeport was annexed into the new Cottonwood-Oak Creek School District.

In a previous period, before the 1991 establishment of Sedona-Oak Creek Unified School District, some Sedona area students attended schools in this district. When Sedona-Oak Creek USD opened in 1991, it took territory from the Cottonwood-Oak Creek district.

== Schools ==
Elementary schools:

- Dr. Daniel Bright Elementary School (Cottonwood)
- Cottonwood Education Services – Preschool & Special Education (Cottonwood)
- Cottonwood Community School (Cottonwood)
- Oak Creek Elementary School (– STEM Focused Cornville)
- Mountain View Preparatory School (MVP) – International Baccalaureate (Cottonwood)
