= Clarkdale Historic District =

Clarkdale Historic District may refer to:

- Clarkdale Historic District (Arizona), listed on the NRHP in Arizona
- Clarkdale Historic District (Georgia), listed on the NRHP in Georgia
