= Cottonwood High School =

Cottonwood High School is the name of various secondary schools in the United States:

- Cottonwood High School (Cottonwood, Alabama)
- Cottonwood High School (Murray, Utah)
- Cottonwood High School (Arizona) (closed 1958)
