= Clarkdale-Jerome Elementary School District =

School district in Arizona, United States

Clarkdale-Jerome Elementary School District 3

Location
- PO Box 248; Clarkdale, Arizona 86324 United States

Other information
- Website: www.cjsd.k12.az.us

Clarkdale-Jerome Elementary School District 3 is a public school district based in Yavapai County, Arizona, United States. It operates the Clarkdale-Jerome School.

It includes Jerome and much of Clarkdale, as well as a small piece of Cottonwood. Areas in the school district are also in Mingus Union High School District.
