= Jerome Junction, Arizona =

Ghost town in Arizona, US

- Ghost town
- Location within Arizona Location within the United States
- Coordinates: 34°47′12″N 112°25′46″W
- Country: United States
- State: Arizona
- County: Yavapai
- Founded: 1894
- Abandoned: 1920
- Time zone: UTC-7 (MST (no DST))

Jerome Junction is a ghost town in Yavapai County, Arizona, United States. Established in 1894, the community served as a railroad transfer stop between the town of Prescott and the town of Jerome. It served as a transfer point between the Santa Fe, Prescott and Phoenix Railway (SFP&P) and the narrow-gauge United Verde & Pacific Railway for 25 years. The narrow-gauge line was built precariously on the side of Woodchute Mountain by William A. Clark after he bought the United Verde Copper Company. In 1917, it had a population of 150. When it was replaced by standard-gauge line on the east side of the mountain from Jerome to Clarkdale in 1920, Jerome Junction became a ghost town, and in 1923, the activities of the former town were absorbed by Chino Valley.

The location changed names at least three times:

- 1895 June 7 – "Junction" post office
- 1914 December 23 – Jerome Junction, railway depot and transfer station
- 1923 April 11 – Copper Siding, Chino Valley, railroad stop

All that remains today are some foundations and railroad equipment. Wikimap Google map

1850		—
1860		—
1870		—
1880		—
1890	250	—
1900	2,500	900%
1910	5,000	100%
1920	15,000	200%
1930	4,900	-67.3333%
1940	2,000	-59.1837%
1950	1,200	-40%
1960	500	-58.3333%
1970	300	-40%
1980	403	34.3333%
1990	350	-13.1514%
2000	329	-6%
2010	400	21.5805%
2020	464	16%
2023 (est.)	463	1%

== See also ==
- List of ghost towns in Arizona
