= Verde Canyon Railroad =

Heritage railroad in Arizona

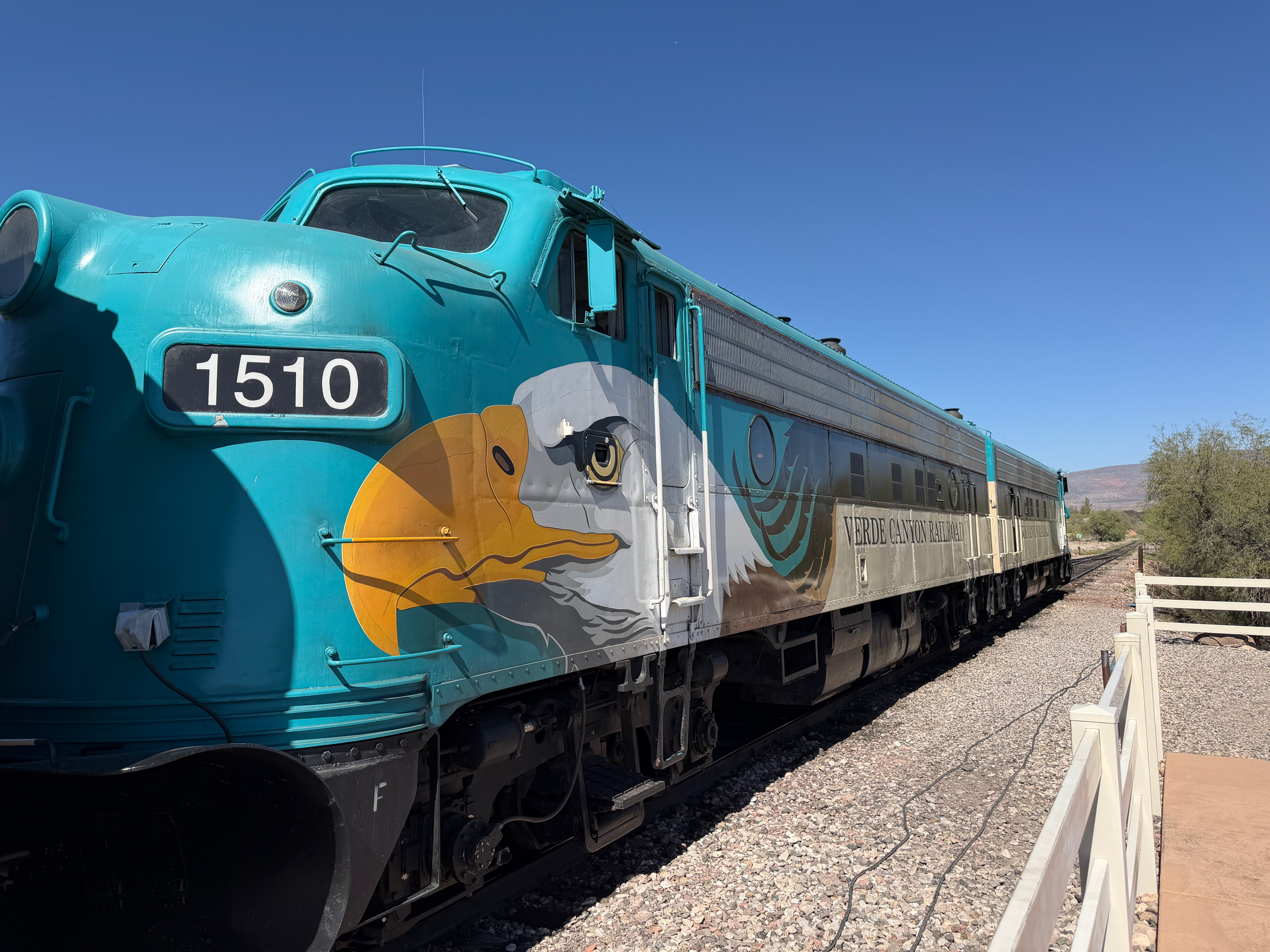
- Preparing to leave from Clarkdale (2025)
- Locale: Yavapai County, Arizona, United States
- Terminus: Clarkdale

Commercial operations
- Built by: Atchison, Topeka and Santa Fe Railway
- Original gauge: 4 ft 8 1/2 in (1,435 mm) standard gauge

Preserved operations
- Owned by: Clarkdale Arizona Central Railroad
- Operated by: Verde Canyon Railroad
- Reporting mark: VCRR, AZCR
- Length: 20 mi (32 km)
- Preserved gauge: 4 ft 8 1/2 in (1,435 mm) standard gauge

Commercial history
- Opened: 1912
- Closed: 1988

Preservation history
- 1989: Clarkdale Arizona Central Railroad takes over the track and resumes freight service
- 1990: Verde Canyon Railroad started up
- Headquarters: Clarkdale

Website
- verdecanyonrr.com

The Verde Canyon Railroad is a heritage railroad running between Clarkdale and Perkinsville in Arizona, United States. The passenger excursion line operates on 20 miles (32 km) of tracks of the Clarkdale Arizona Central Railroad (AZCR), a shortline. The Verde Canyon Railroad has its depot, headquarters, and a railway museum in Clarkdale, about 25 miles (40 km) southwest of Sedona.

== Motive power ==
The vintage diesel locomotives, EMD FP7s 1510 and 1512, pulling the classic passenger cars are two of only ten remaining in operation in North America. They were originally built for the Alaska Railroad in 1953 by the Electro-Motive Division of General Motors in LaGrange, Illinois. The engines debuted their eagle-inspired paint livery along these rails on March 8, 1997. Before setting out, numbers 1510 and 1512 were renovated with modern features added for safety. In 2019, the locomotives were imprinted with an updated paint motif and advanced mechanics.

== History ==
The tracks on which the Verde Canyon Railroad runs were opened in 1912 as part of a north–south branch line linking a copper smelter at Clarkdale and the copper mines at Jerome to Santa Fe Railway tracks passing through Drake. The Santa Fe Railway owned and operated the 38-mile (61 km) branch line from 1912 to 1988.

David L. Durbano bought the branch line in 1988. Passenger service between Clarkdale at milepost 38 and Perkinsville at milepost 18, resumed in 1990 under the name Verde Canyon Railroad. Milepost 0 of the AZCR is at Drake, where the line meets the BNSF Railway system. The AZCR track to Drake is still used for hauling freight even though the excursion line stops at Perkinsville.

Excursions involve a four-hour, 40-mile (64 km) round trip from Clarkdale to Perkinsville, where scenes from How the West Was Won were filmed in the 1960s. The route follows the Verde River, crossing bridges and trestles, and passes through a 680-foot-long (210 m) curved tunnel. Between milepost 30 and Perkinsville, most of the land along the railroad right-of-way is in the Prescott National Forest or, across the river, the Coconino National Forest.

The railroad carries about 100,000 passengers per year. In 2005, the Verde Canyon Railroad celebrated its one-millionth passenger, and the following month was named an "Arizona Treasure" by Arizona Governor Janet Napolitano.

== Museum ==
The John Bell Railroad Museum is part of the depot complex in Clarkdale. Housed in an old boxcar, the museum displays rail artifacts and photographs, many of which came from Bell's personal collection.

== Gallery ==
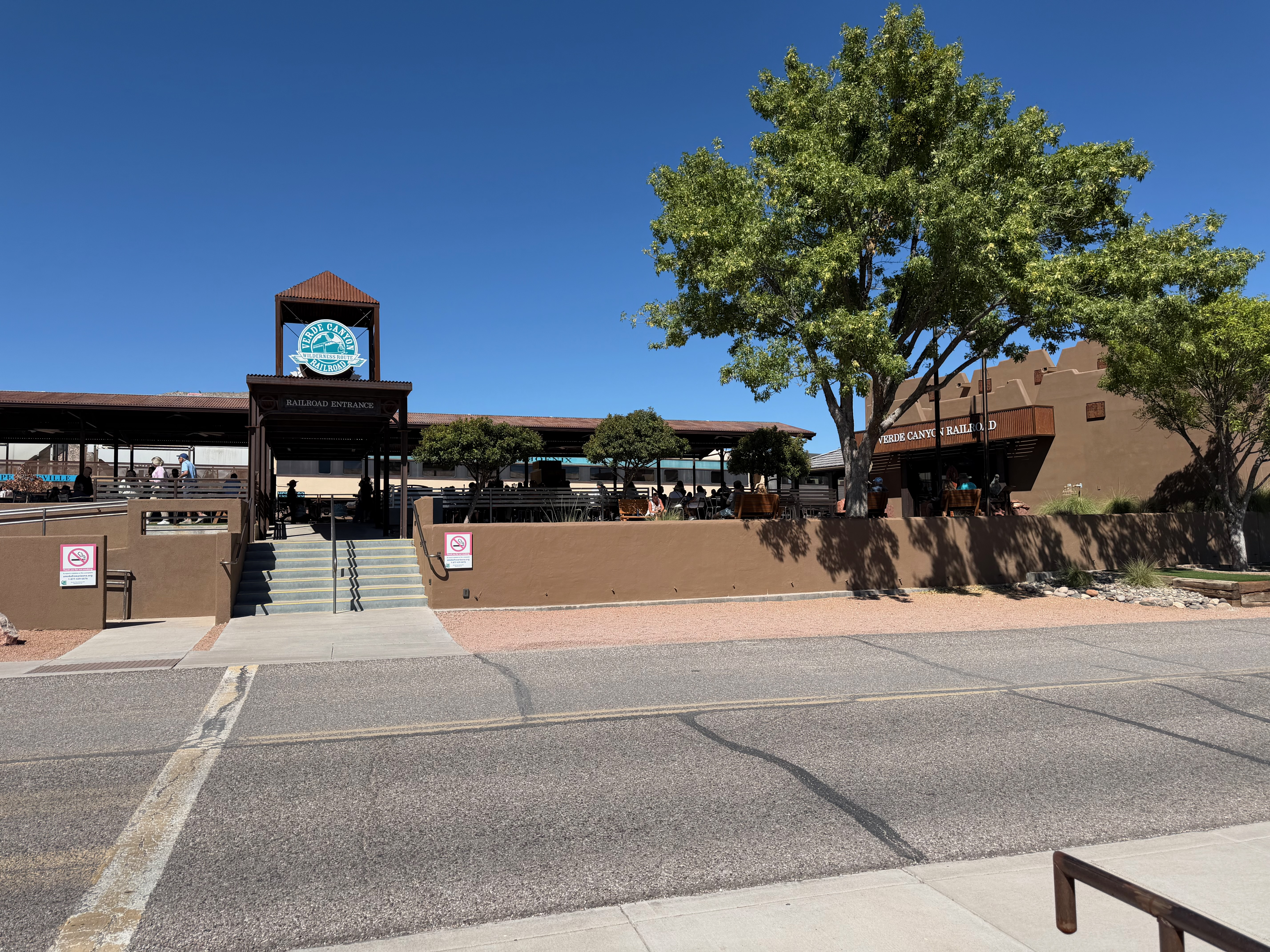
Terminal at Clarkdale

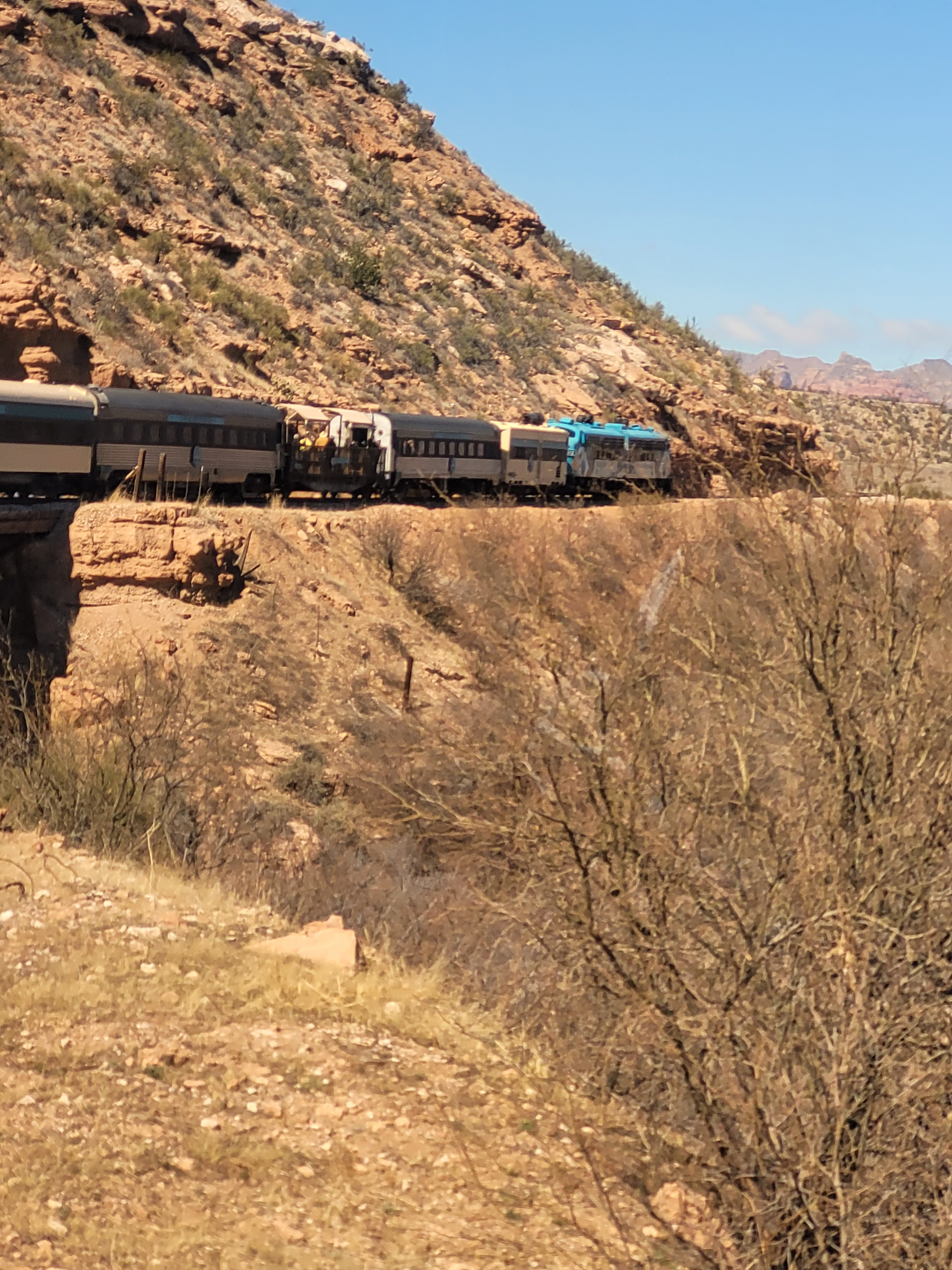
Verde Canyon Railroad, Arizona

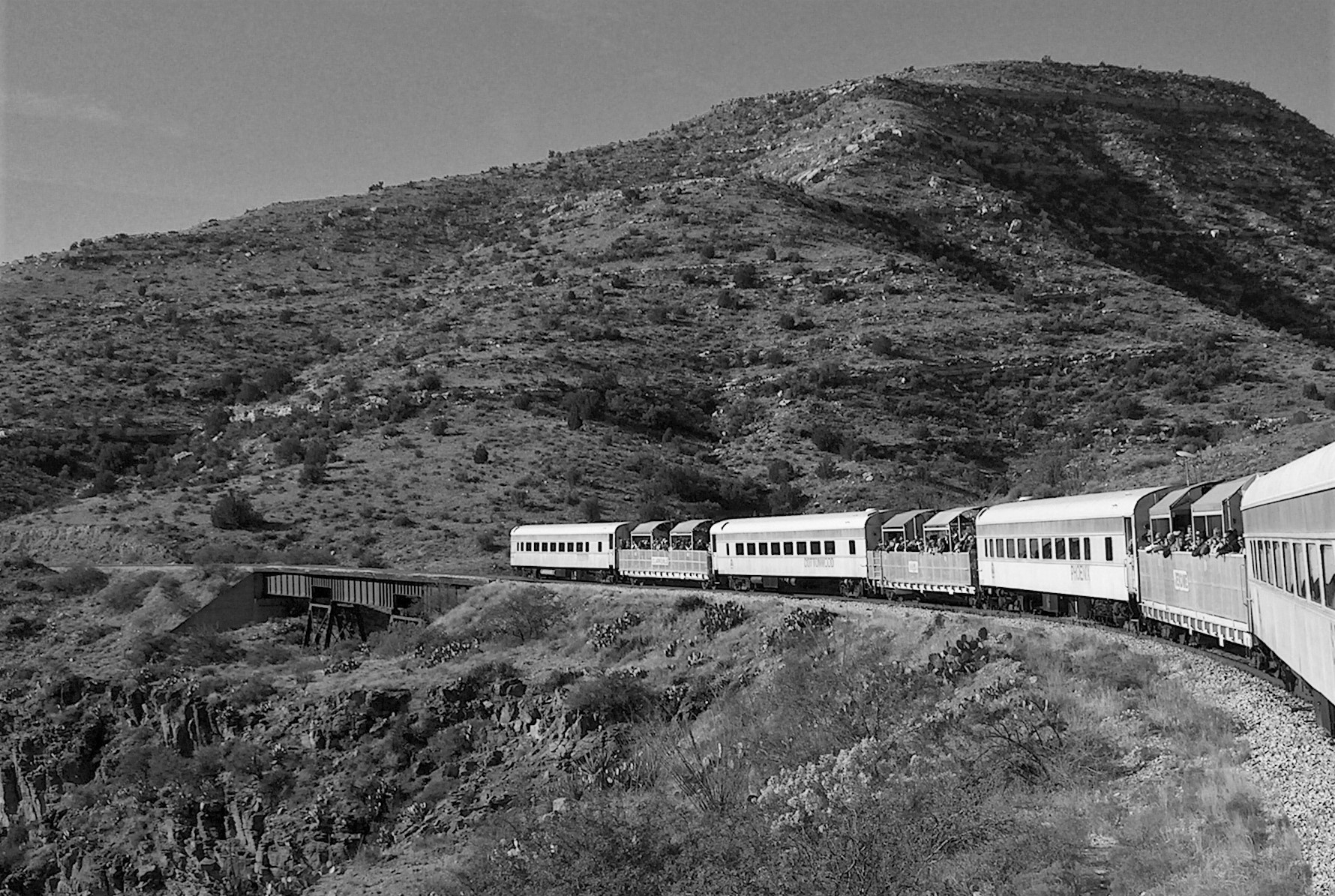
Open viewing cars

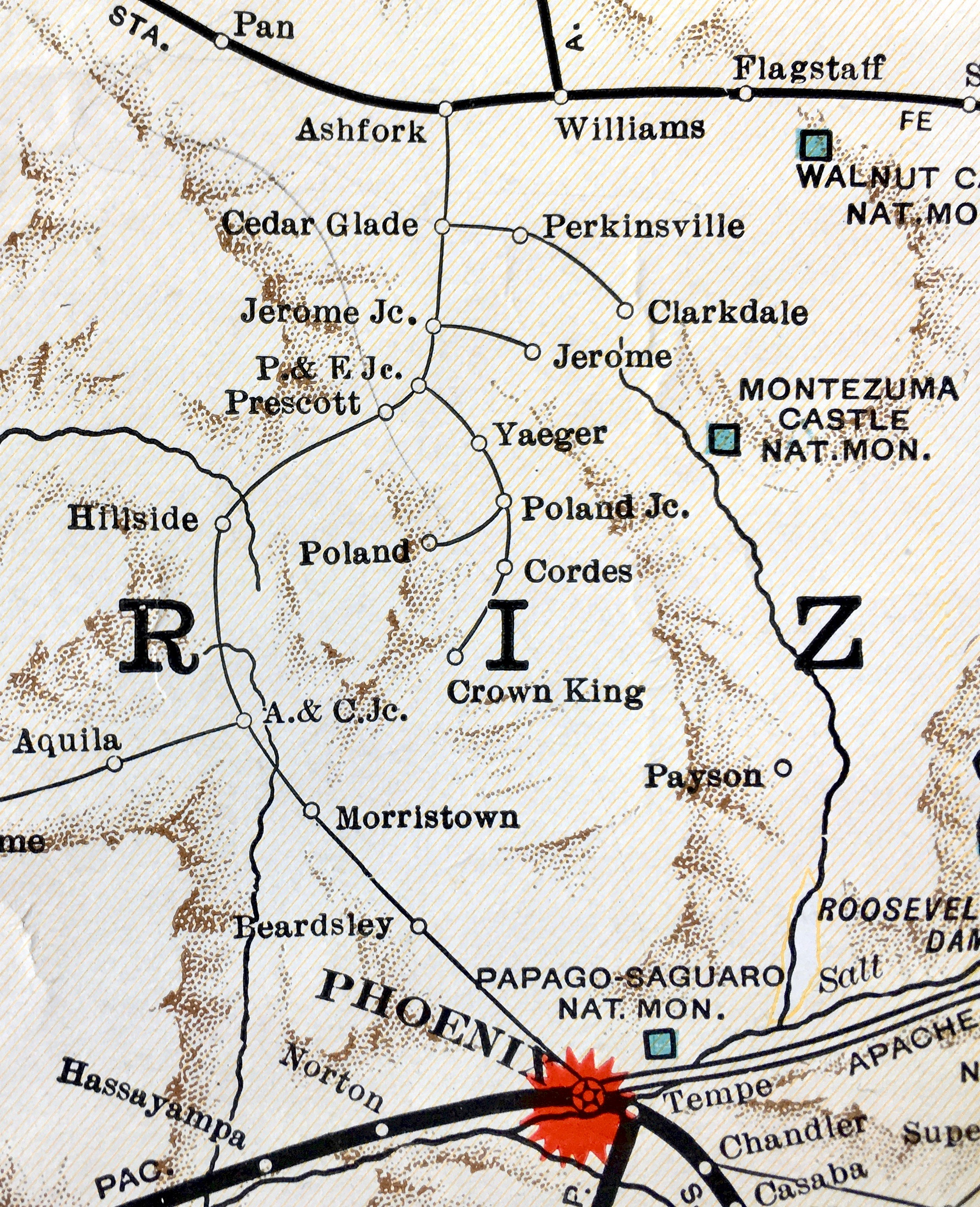
Route in 1930

== See also ==
- List of heritage railroads in the United States
- List of historic properties in Clarkdale, Arizona

== Works cited ==
- "Rail: The Official Magazine of the Verde Canyon Railroad". Rail: The Official Magazine of the Verde Canyon Railroad. Clarkdale, Arizona: Verde Canyon Railroad. 2011. OCLC 41598511.
