= Arizona Copper Art Museum =

Art museum in Arizona

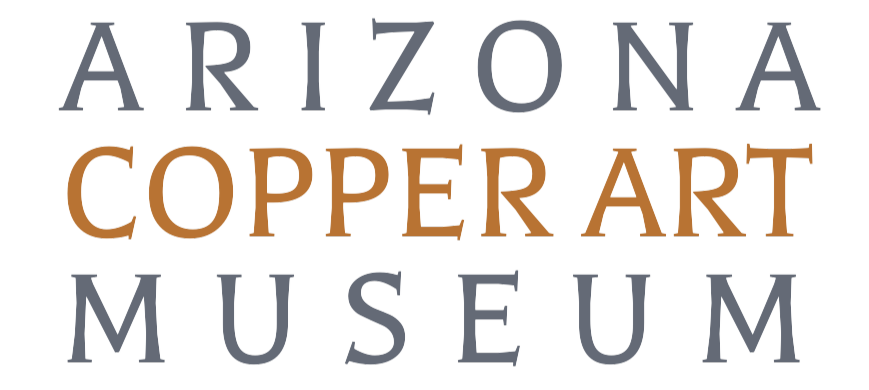

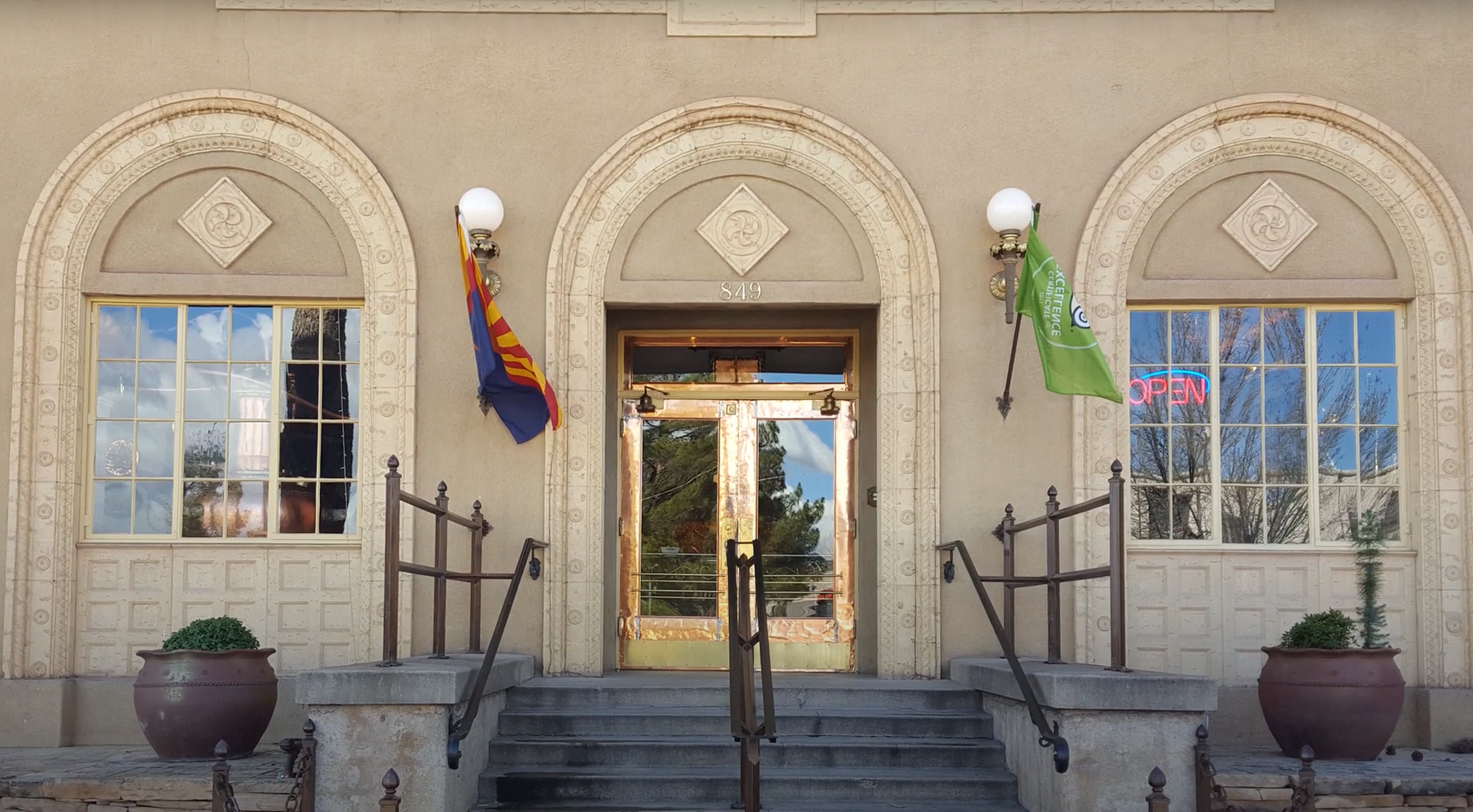
- Exterior in 2020

- Location within Arizona Location within the United States
- Established: 2012
- Location: 849 Main St, Clarkdale, AZ 86324
- Coordinates: 34.7711°N 112.0568°W
- Type: Art museum
- Collection size: 5,000+
- Founders: Patricia Meinke; Drake Meinke
- Owner: Arizona Copper Art Museum Inc.
- Website: www.arizonacopperartmuseum.com

The Arizona Copper Art Museum is an art museum in Clarkdale, Arizona. Located in the former Clarkdale High School building, it was founded in 2012 and displays over 5,000 copper artifacts. It won the Arizona Governor's Tourism Award in 2014.

== History ==
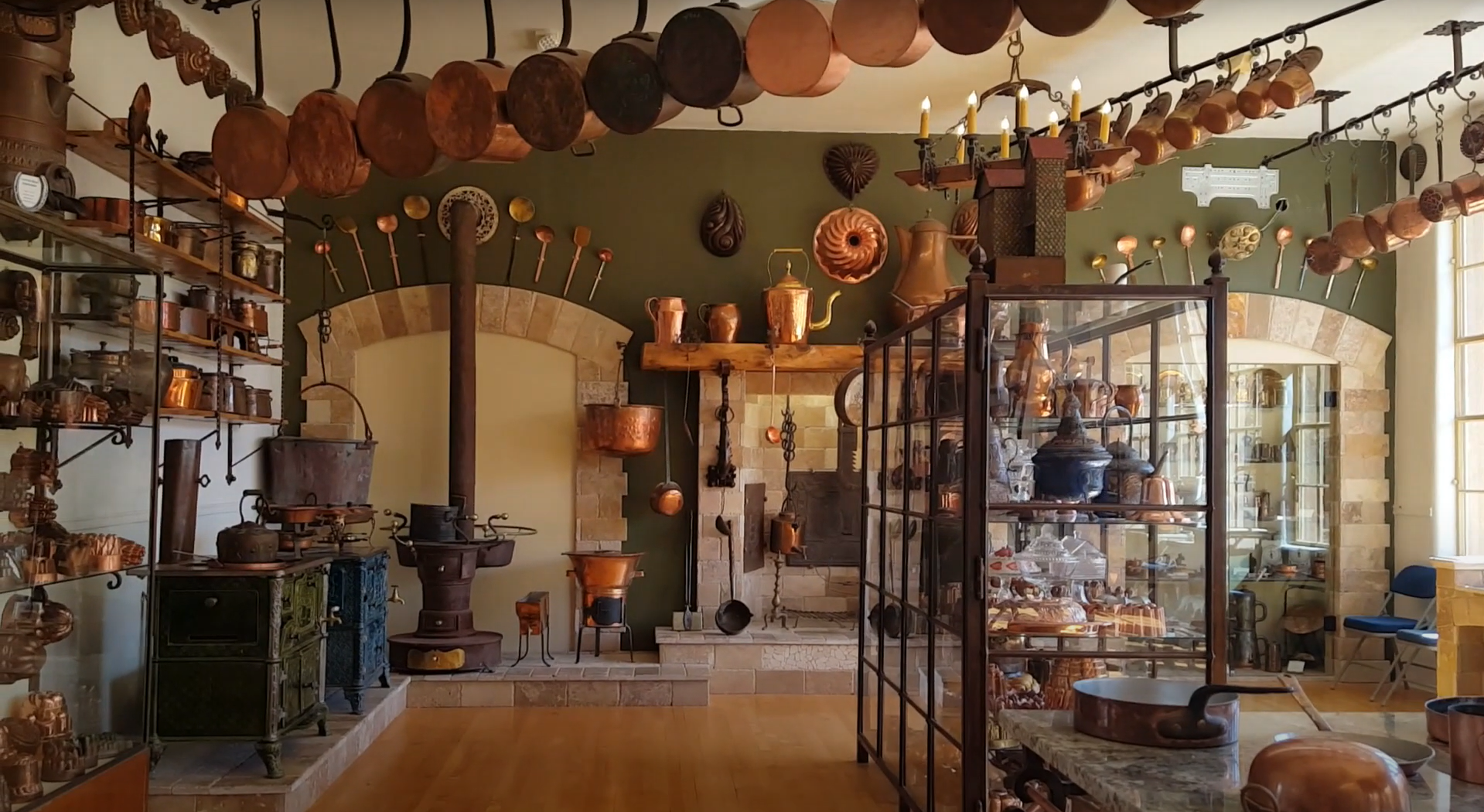
A room inside the museum in 2020

John and Patricia Meinke became involved in copper in 1958 when they saw a few copper molds in an antique store. This inspired them to begin collecting copper and open a store. The store closed in the 1970s as the Meinkes preferred selling copper at antique shows in large American cities. Most of the copper was sourced from Europe. Their son, Drake, joined the family business in 1978.

The family began thinking about sharing their copper collection with the public and made plans for a museum. Drake searched for the best location in the U.S. for two years and finally found a place for the museum, in Clarkdale, Arizona. They had chosen Arizona due to it being nicknamed "The Copper State" the largest copper producer in the U.S., while Clarkdale was a city known for its past as a copper smelting town producing billions of pounds of copper, silver, and gold. The old high school was for sale but in poor condition and was purchased in 2002, and the restoration of the building and incorporation of their two existing collections began in 2004. The high school operated from 1928 to 1960 and sat virtually empty from 1960 until 2002. After eight years of restoring the building and preparing the exhibits, the museum opened in 2012, during the centennial celebrations of both Clarkdale and Arizona. In 2022, the museum purchased 901 Main St., formerly Miller's Market, a building on Clarkdale's main street, to expand of their display area.

== Exhibits ==
The museum has six main collections of copper art: Historical Information, Military Art, Art and Architecture, Kitchenware, Drinkware, and Distillery and Winery. The Historical Information exhibit details the history of copper, its uses, and its features. Most of the Military Art collection consists of artillery shell casings made from copper, while the Art and Architecture display shows the use of copper through human creativity and expression.
