= Clarkdale Historic District (Clarkdale, Arizona) =

Historic district in Arizona, United States

- U.S. National Register of Historic Places
- U.S. Historic district
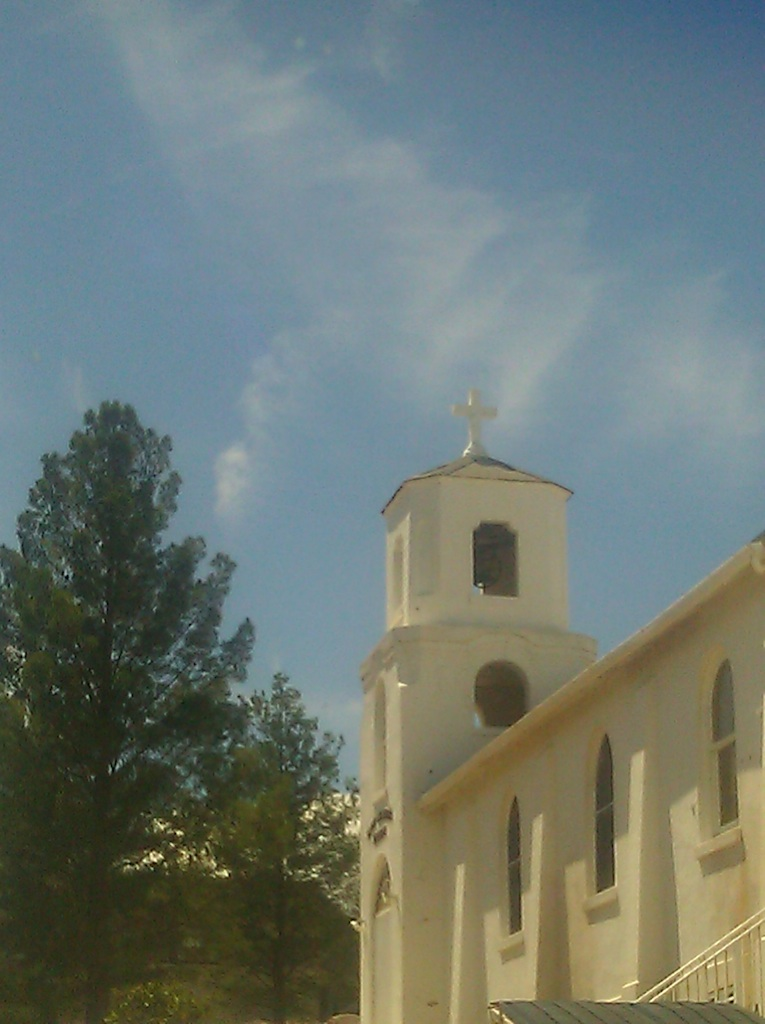
- St. Cecilia's Rectory

- Location within Arizona Location within the United States
- Location: Roughly along Main St., roughly bounded by Verde R. including industrial smelter site., Clarkdale, Arizona
- Coordinates: 34°46′27″N 112°3′31″W
- Architectural style: Mission/Spanish Revival, Classical Revival, Bungalow/Craftsman
- NRHP reference No.: 97001586
- Added to NRHP: January 8, 1998

Clarkdale Historic District in Clarkdale, Arizona is a historic district that was listed on the National Register of Historic Places in 1998.

Clarkdale was built as a company town for the United Verde Copper Company, owned by William A. Clark, which located a smelter in Clarkdale.

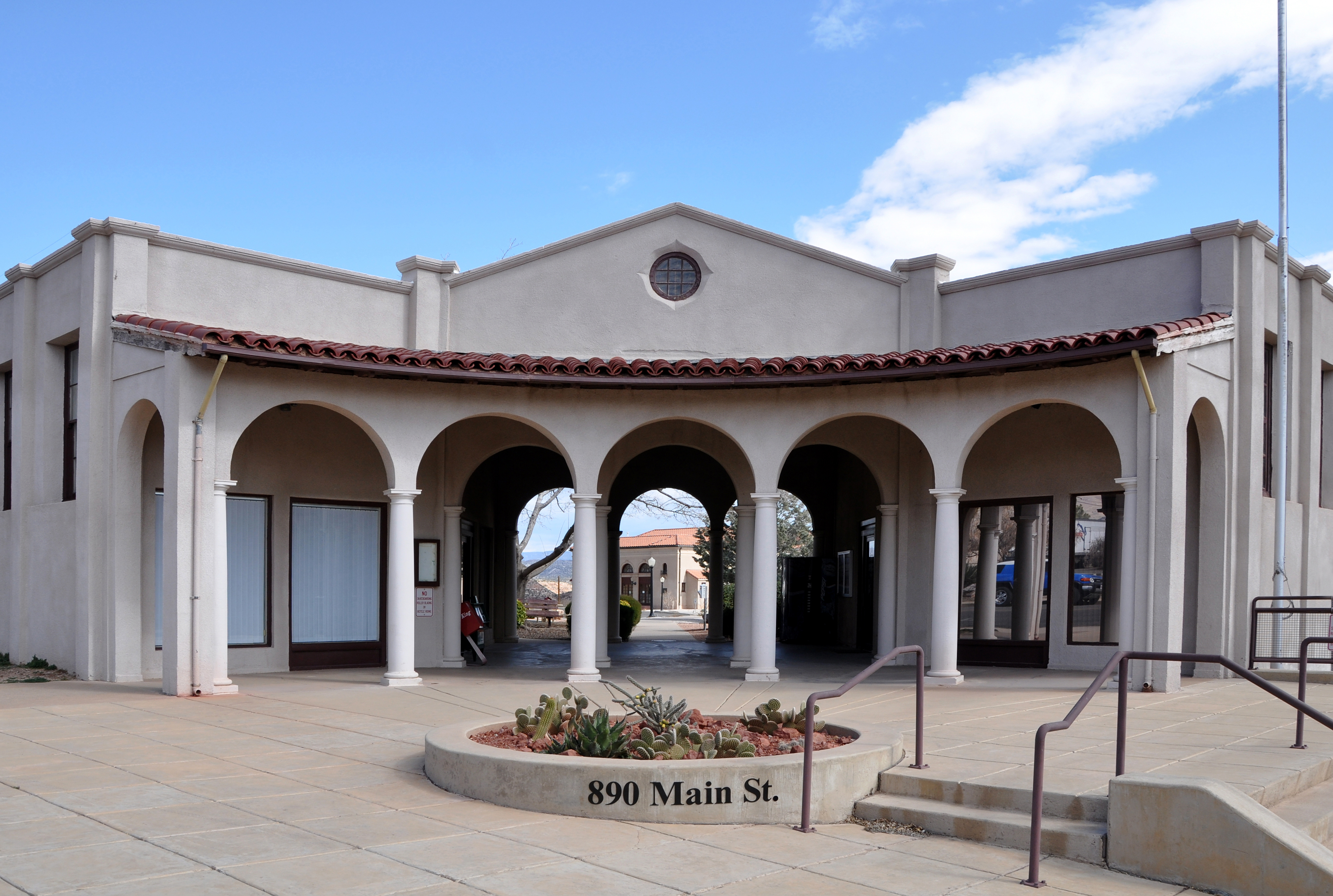
Clarkdale Public Works Building.

Historic district contributing properties include:

- Clark Mansion
- Clarkdale Public Works Building
- Clark Memorial Clubhouse, also separately NRHP-listed
- Broadway Bridge, also separately NRHP-listed

== See also ==
- National Register of Historic Places in Yavapai County, Arizona

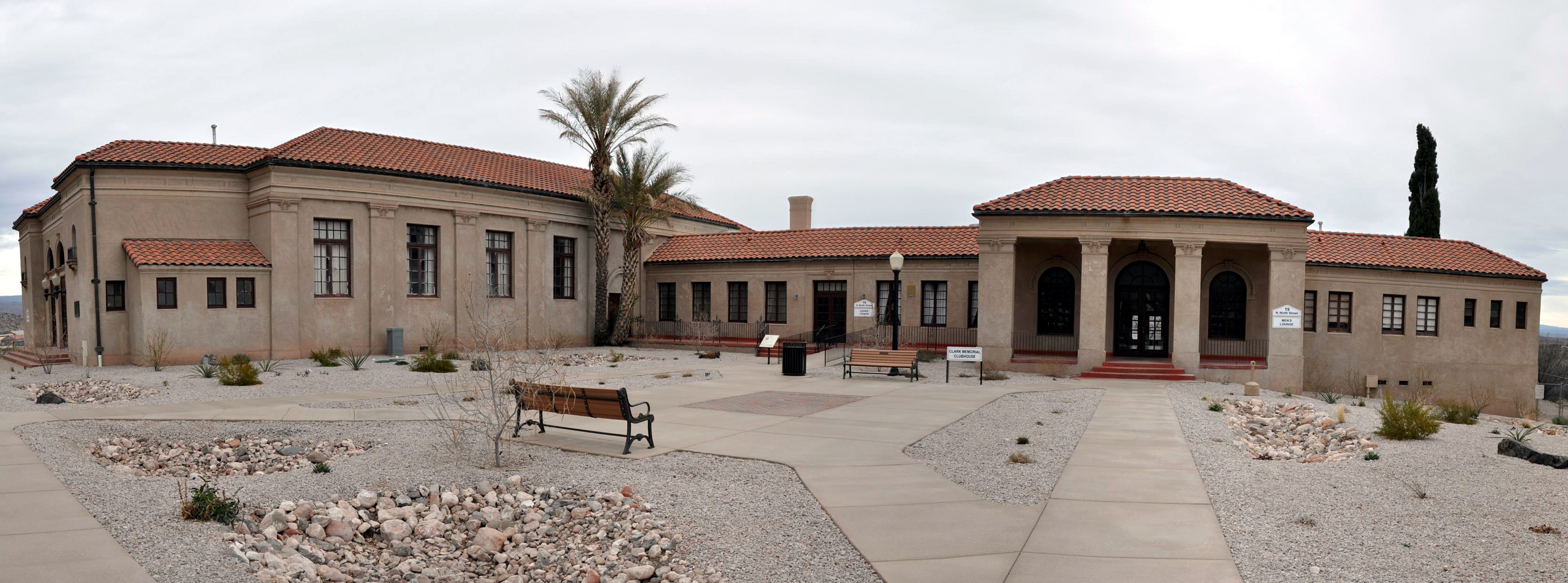
Clark Memorial Clubhouse complex (NRHP-listed) – in Clarkdale, Arizona.
