= Phoenix Cement Company =

Cement provider for the Glen Canyon Dam

- Company type: Private
- Industry: Construction materials
- Founded: Clarkdale, Arizona, United States (1959)
- Headquarters: Scottsdale, Arizona
- Key people: Roger R. Smith, Chief Executive Officer and President
- Products: Portland cement, gypsum, and fly ash
- Website: Salt River Materials Group

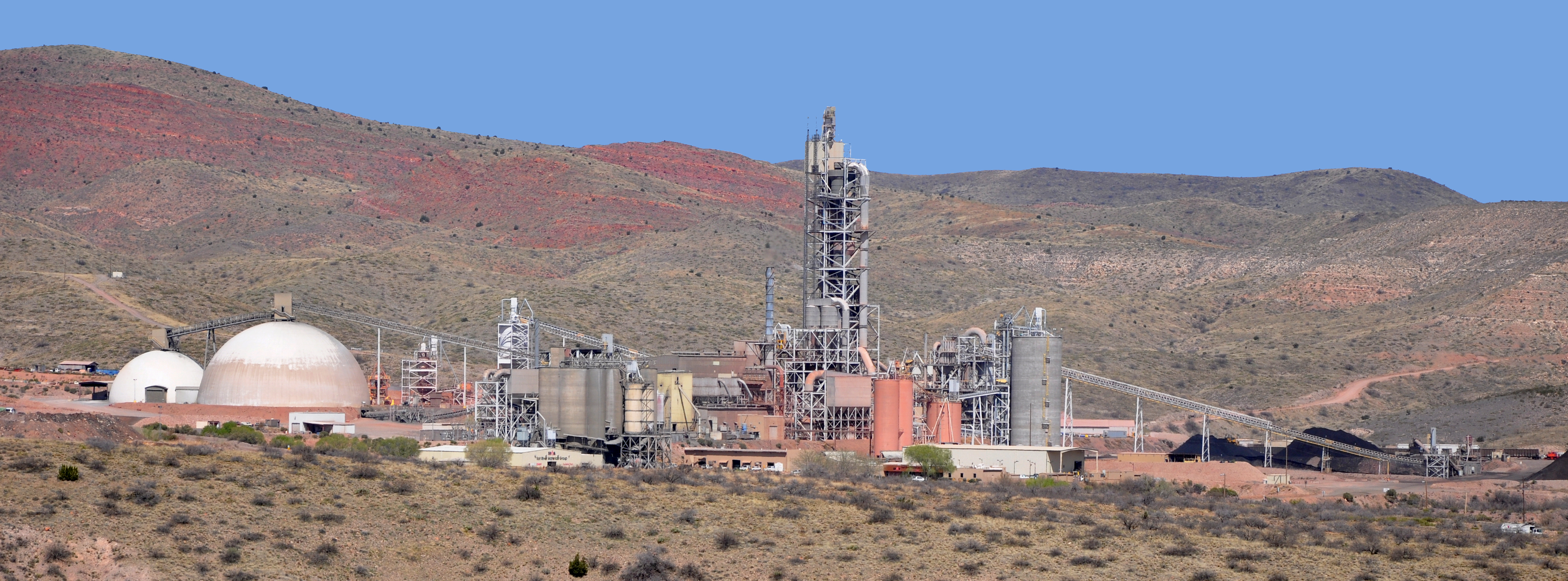
The plant at Clarkdale in 2013

The Phoenix Cement Company, headquartered in Phoenix, operates a cement plant in Clarkdale in the U.S. state of Arizona. Built in 1959 by the American Cement Company to make cement for the construction of the Glen Canyon Dam on the Colorado River, the Clarkdale plant produces Portland cement, fly ash, and gypsum for a regional market.

The first load of cement for the dam left Clarkdale by truck in October 1959, and shipments continued for nearly five years. North of Flagstaff, the trucks in the early years traveled on an unpaved road to Page, where the dam was being built. A truck loaded with cement left the Clarkdale plant every 15 minutes until the dam was finished in July 1964.

Plans called for the plant to close after the dam was completed, but other projects materialized. Instead of decommissioning the plant, the owners expanded it by one-third in 1961, and it has since become the main source of cement for northern Arizona and Phoenix. In 2002, the company added a new kiln system and a 418-foot (127 m) tall pre-heater tower, and since then has upgraded the plant in other ways. Company officials estimate that the raw materials in the area can supply the plant for another 150 years.

Although its name has remained constant, the company has had several owners. It was a division of Amcord from 1973 to 1979 and of Gifford-Hill from 1979 through 1987. Since then, the Salt River Pima–Maricopa Indian Community has owned the company and the plant. In 2003, the company's sales activities were combined with those of Salt River Sand and Rock under the name Salt River Materials Group (SRMG).
