= Jerome High School (Arizona) =

Former high school

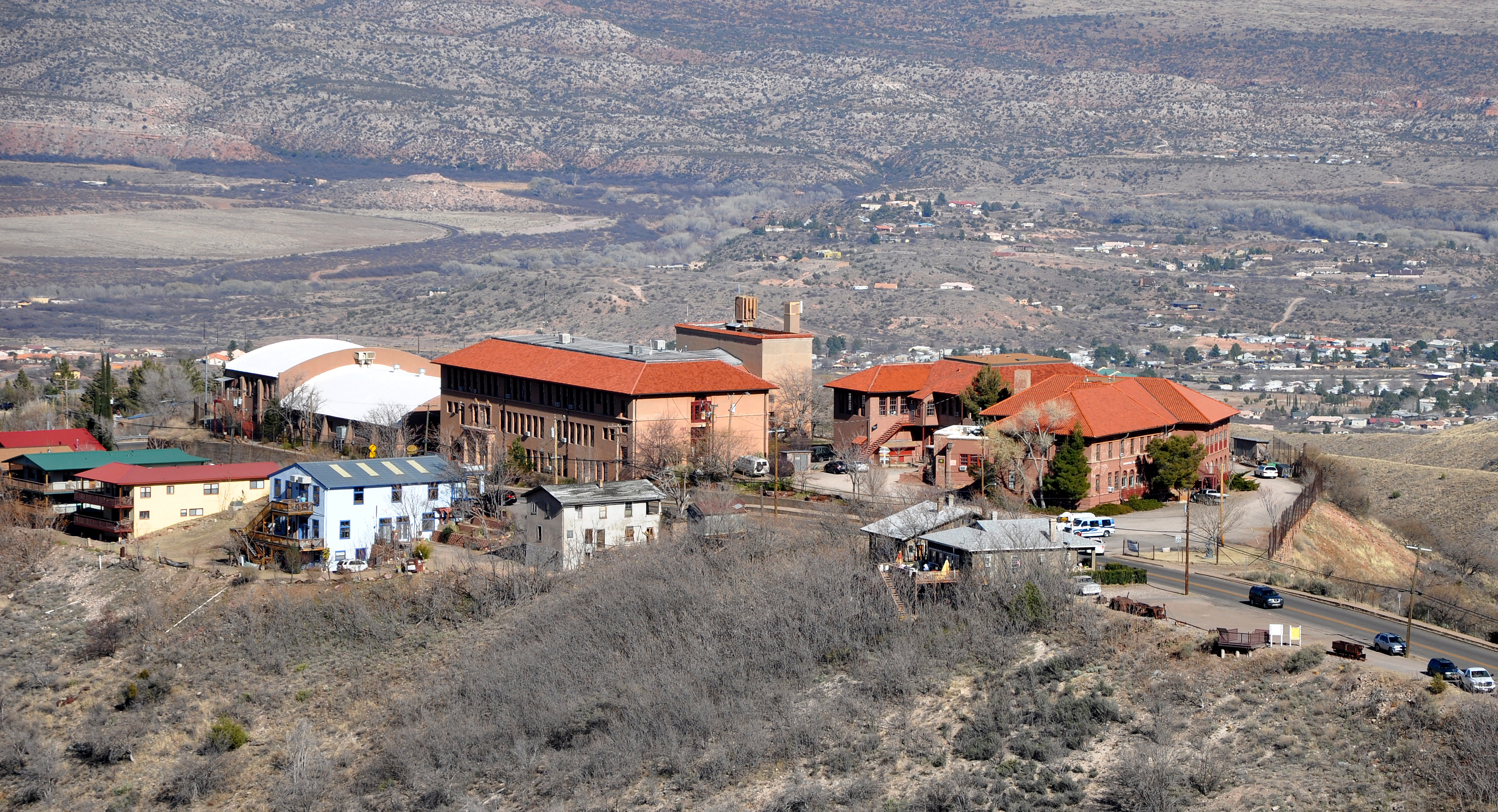

Information
- Established: 1923
- Closed: 1951

Jerome High School was the high school for the town of Jerome, Arizona. The mascot was the Muckers. It opened in 1923 and closed in 1951, when it was consolidated along with Clarkdale High School into Mingus High School. In 1958, when Cottonwood High School was added, that school became known as Mingus Union High School, which was housed in Jerome from 1960 to 1975.

The buildings are used in the 21st century for artists' studios, light industry, and private business.
