= Phoenix Subdivision (BNSF Railway) =

Railway line in Arizona

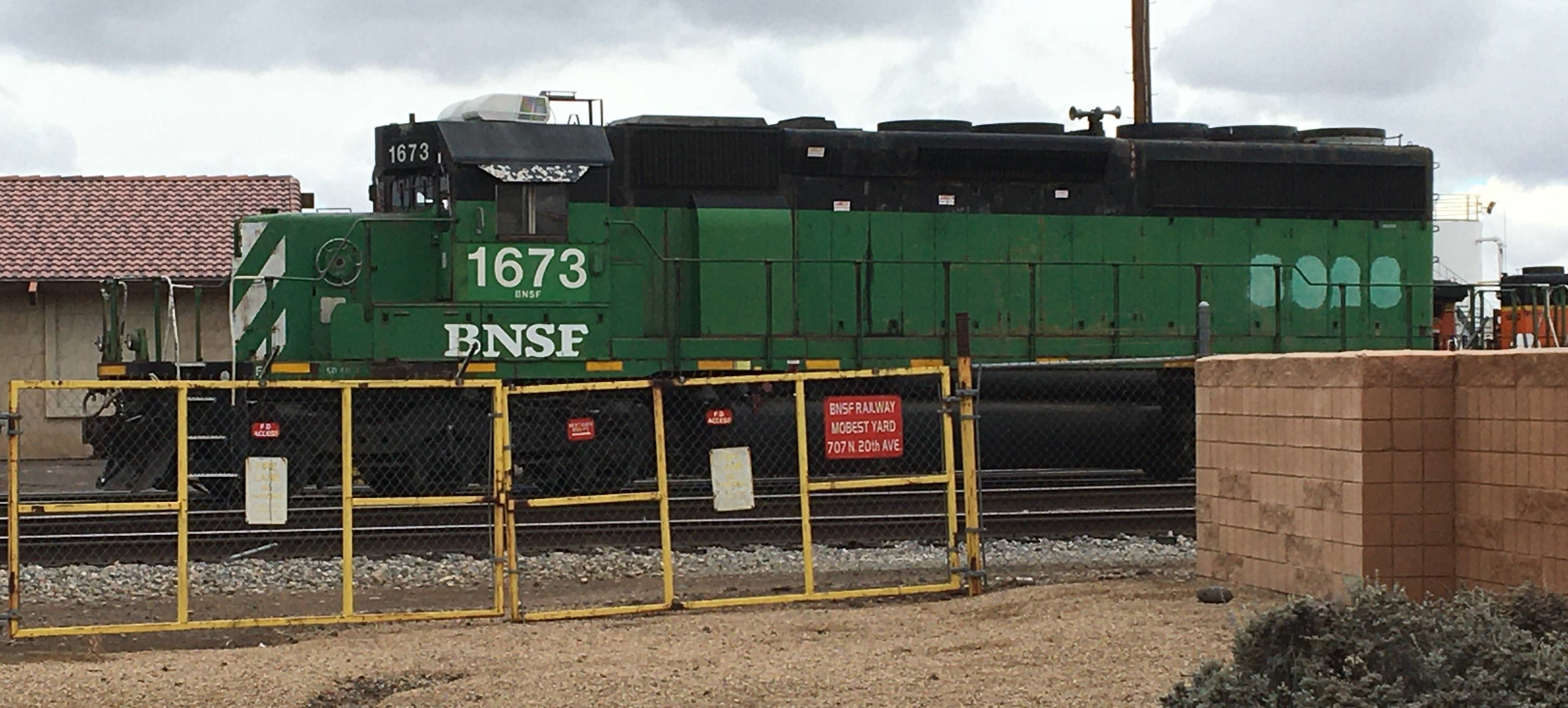
- BNSF SD40-2 No. 1673 (fmr BN) Sitting In Mobest Yard in Phoenix, AZ

Overview
- Owner: BNSF Railway
- Locale: Arizona
- Termini: Williams, AZ; Phoenix, AZ
- Connecting lines: BNSF Seligman Subdivision; Clarkdale Arizona Central Railroad; Arizona and California Railroad; Phoenix Subdivision (UP)
- Website: https://www.bnsf.com/

Service
- Type: Inter-city rail Freight rail
- Operator: BNSF Railway

History
- Work began: 1892
- Completed: 1895

Technical
- Track length: 194 mi (312 km)
- Number of tracks: 1
- Track gauge: 4 ft 8 1/2 in (1,435 mm) standard gauge
- Operating speed: 49 mph (79 km/h)
Route map
Phoenix Subdivision (BNSF)

The Phoenix Subdivision is a railroad line in the U.S. state of Arizona owned by the BNSF Railway. It runs from Phoenix in the south to Williams Junction in the north where it connects to the Seligman Subdivision and Southern Transcon. As of 2018 about eight trains daily operate over the line with top speeds of up to 49 miles per hour (79 km/h). The line is part of a system of proposed commuter rail lines in the Phoenix metropolitan area.

The line from Williams to Ash Fork was initially laid out by the Atlantic and Pacific Railroad, though much of this section was reconstructed by the Atchison, Topeka and Santa Fe Railway (predecessor to BNSF) in 1960 to bypass several sharp curves and steep gradients. South of Ash Fork the route largely follows the original Santa Fe, Prescott and Phoenix Railway, except for segments around Prescott which were similarly bypassed in the 1960s.

== Southwest Railplex Industrial District ==
There is a large business park as a Foreign Trade Zone (FTZ) at the Southeast corner of Surprise, Arizona known as the Southwest Railplex industrial district. This area has rail access to the BNSF Railway via the Phoenix Subdivision.

== Logistics Park Phoenix ==
BNSF has been in development of a project called Logistics Park Phoenix since 2022. BNSF purchased land around Wittmann, Arizona from the State of Arizona in an auction in March 2022. Even more land was purchased in January 2026. As of 2026, BNSF was in the process of planning and getting approval for a large intermodal/logistics center. There had been proposed annexation to Surprise. The annexation effort was ended in June 2024.

== Sources ==
- Pry, Mark; Andersen, Fred (December 2011). "Arizona Transportation History" (PDF). ADOT. Archived from the original (PDF) on June 6, 2017.
