= Drake, Arizona =

Unincorporated community in the state of Arizona, United States

- Unincorporated community
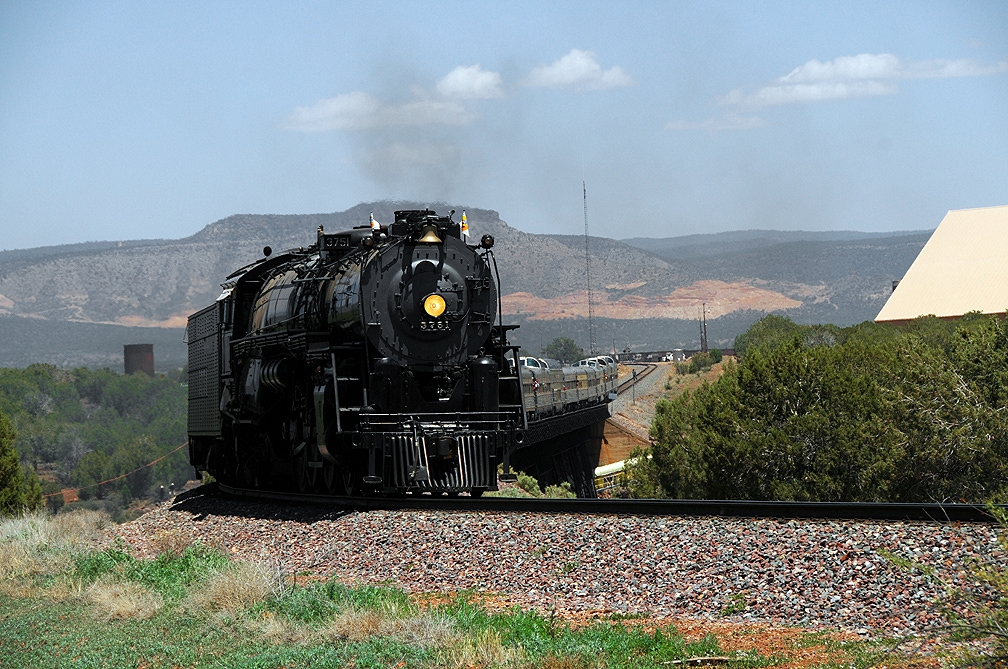
- Santa Fe 3751 pulls an excursion train across Hell Canyon on the BNSF, 2012

- Location within the state of Arizona Drake, Arizona (the United States)
- Coordinates: 34°58′54″N 112°22′34″W
- Country: United States
- State: Arizona
- County: Yavapai
- Elevation: 4,659 ft (1,420 m)
- Time zone: UTC-7 (Mountain (MST))
- ZIP codes: 86334
- GNIS feature ID: 28592

Drake was an unincorporated community on the Verde River in Yavapai County, Arizona, United States, and a station on the BNSF Railway's Phoenix Subdivision. Drake is also the junction and western terminus of the Verde Canyon Railroad. Drake is the site of the old Hell Canyon Bridge (built in 1923), formerly used by US Route 89, and now on the National Register of Historic Places.

== History ==
Drake was a town in the early 1900s, which grew out of a railway work camp for construction of the very high "Big Hell Canyon Railroad Bridge", on high trestles, completed in 1901. It was first known as Cedar Glade, and had a population of 70 in 1909. It was renamed to "Drake" in 1920.

In 1912 Cedar Glade "became the junction for the Verde Valley Railroad, which accessed a copper smelter in Clarkdale .... Approximately 20 structures had been built there by the railroad, including a depot, agent's house, water tank, a number of section houses, bunkhouse, and freight warehouses. The railroad kept a small staff in Drake thru the 1950s." Cedar Glade was home to a boarding house and veterinarian, as well as the Swanbeck store.

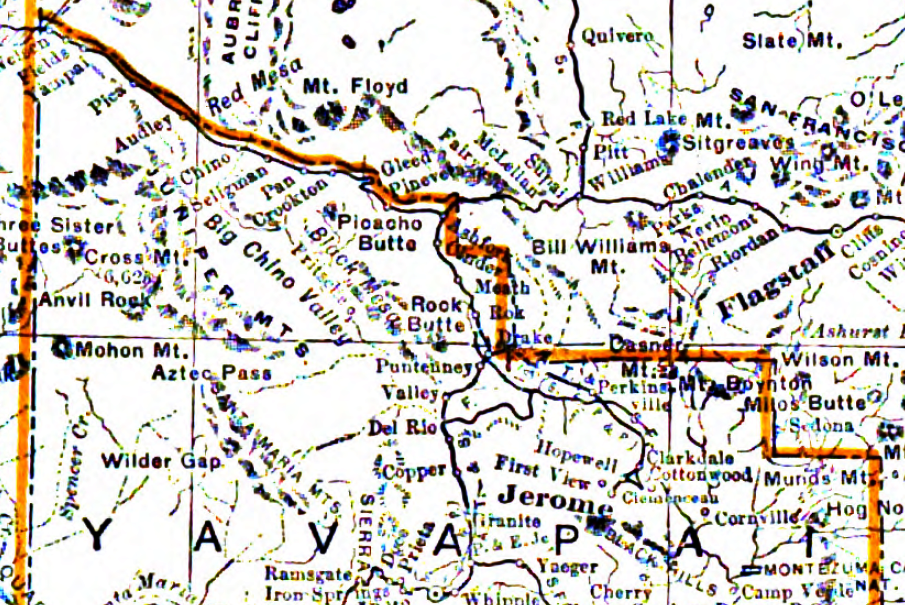
Northern Yavapai County, 1925, showing the locations of Drake and Puntenney

In 1920, Drake's population was recorded as 18.

In 1919, the towns of Puntenney and Cedar Glade were placed under quarantine due to a Smallpox outbreak. No resident was allowed to leave either community, although passengers on the Santa Fe Railroad were still allowed to change cars at Cedar Glade. 1922 saw a running gunfight through the streets during the era of prohibition.

A separate schoolhouse was built in 1928, though children were taught in Drake by teachers around 1920, and earlier they crossed the railway trestle to attend school in Puntenney, Arizona. In October 1919 a two-room house and the public school in Cedar Glade were burned, and school was dismissed. The 1920 Census listed Barnetta Ball, age 39, as "Teacher Public School." Elizabeth Stroud was teacher in Drake mentioned in a January 30, 1922, article in the Arizona Republic.

Drake historical population
Year	Pop.	±%
1909	70	—
1920	18	−74.3%
1940	17	−5.6%
1960	12	−29.4%

Drake was also the nearest community to Little Hell Canyon Bridge, another road bridge about 8 miles (13 km) up Hell Canyon, when that was listed on the National Register in 1987.

In 1944 the average annual precipitation for Drake, which is in a valley at elevation 4,610 feet (1,410 m), was believed to be 14.10 inches (0.358 m).

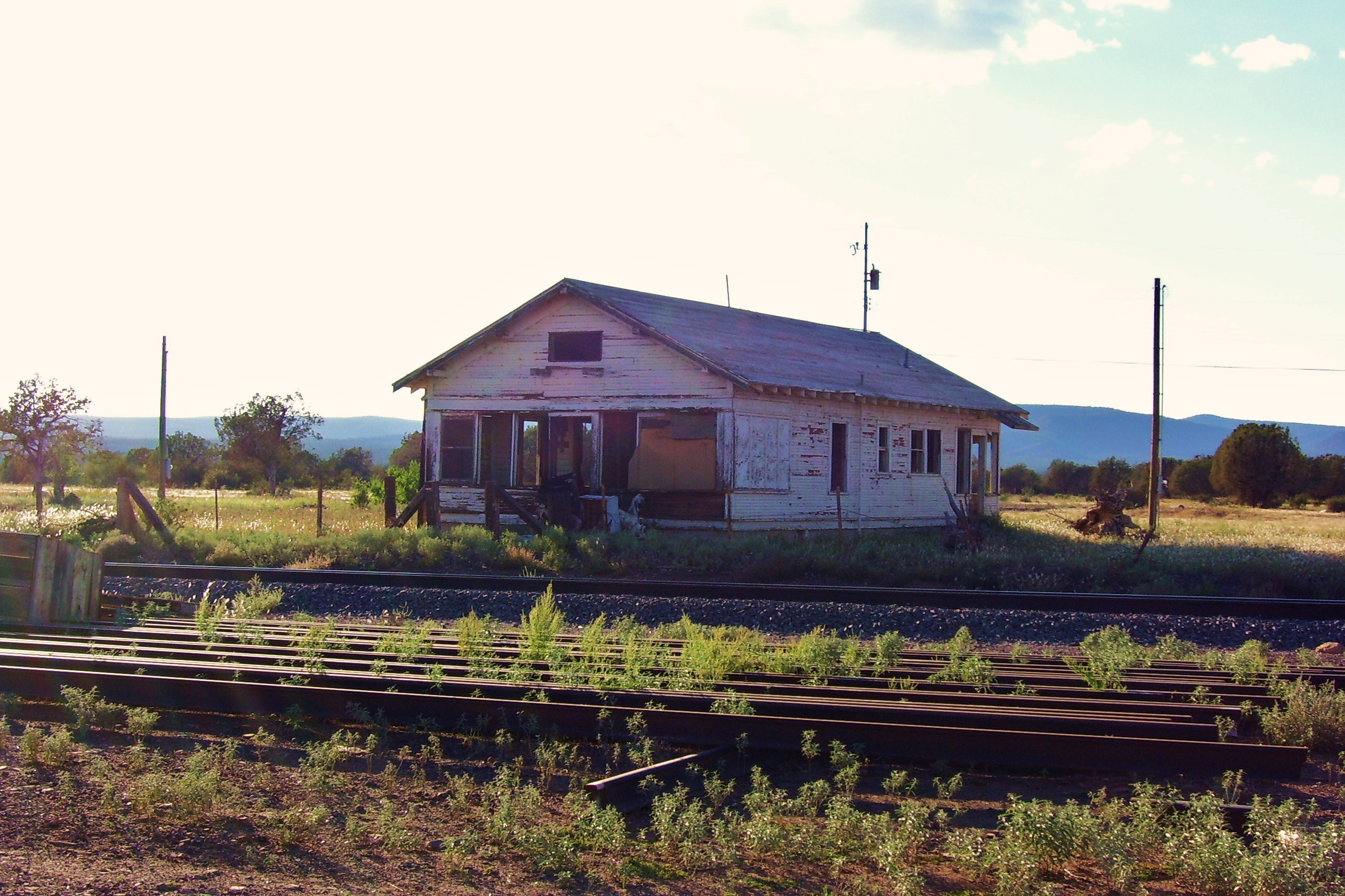
"One of the abandoned buildings in the Drake area", in 2006

In 1956, the Republic Cement Corporation of Delaware proposed building a cement manufacturing plant in the town of Drake after obtaining mining claims in Drake and in San Bernardino, California.

Drake's population was 17 in 1940, and was 12 in the 1960 U.S. Census.

The road bridge between Drake and Puntenney has been blocked by the Drake Cement plant.

Drake is the location of the historic Cedar Glade Cemetery, also known as Drake Cemetery, which is located on property of the Drake Cement Company. In 2019 the Drake Cement company gave notice of intent to remove all remains and relocate the historic Cedar Glade Cemetery, on its property. The cemetery had burials from c.1891 to c.1930.

== Education ==
It is in the Chino Valley Unified School District.

== See also ==
- Arizona State Route 89
