= Clarkdale, Arizona =

Town in Yavapai County, Arizona

Clarkdale
- Town
- Clarkdale, Arizona
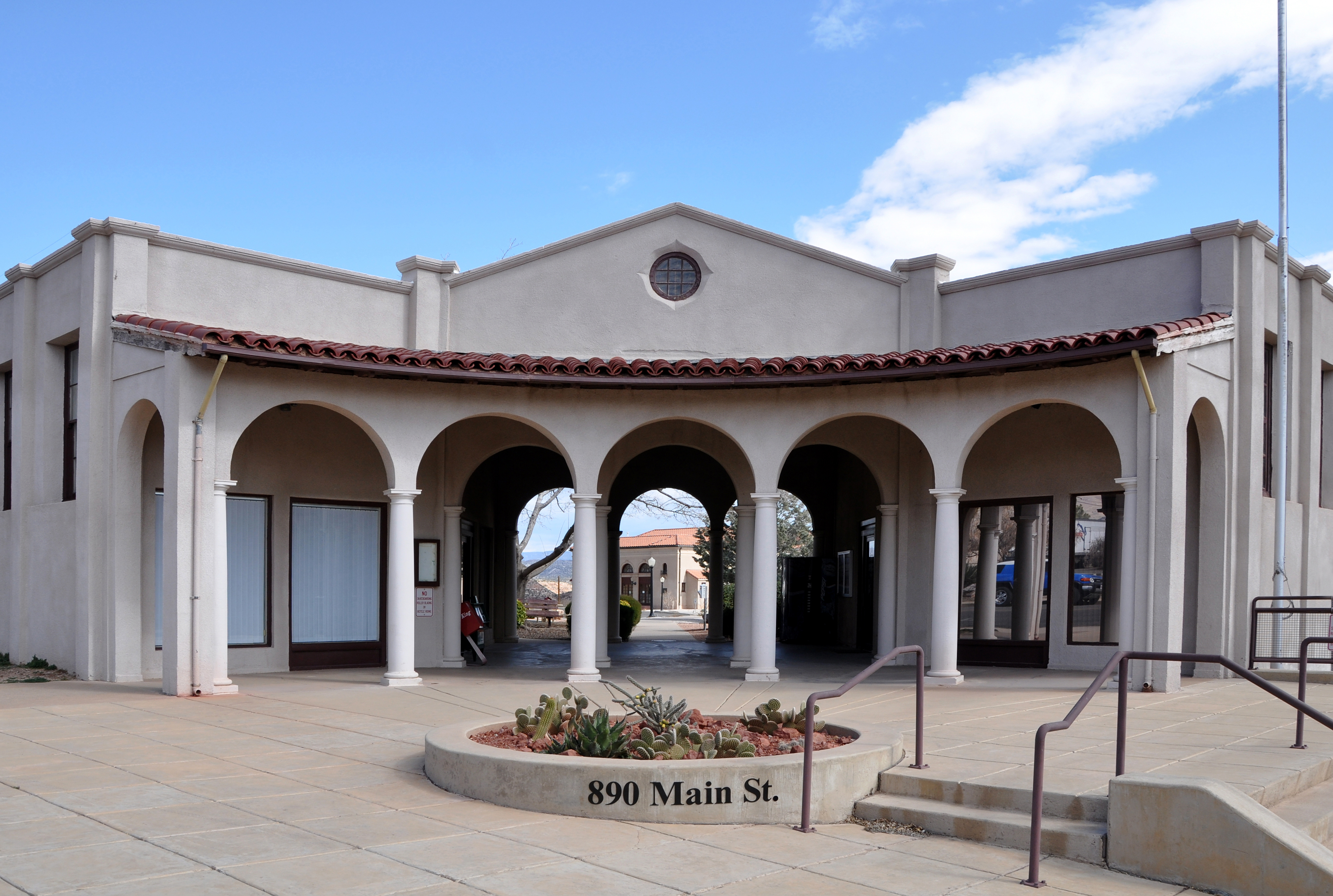
- Public Works Building

- Flag
- Motto: "A Place That Makes Sense"
- Location of Clarkdale in Yavapai County, Arizona.

- Location in Arizona Clarkdale (the United States)
- Coordinates: 34°44′40″N 112°03′29″W
- Country: United States
- State: Arizona
- County: Yavapai

Government
  - Type: Council-Manager
  - Mayor: Robyn Prud'homme-Bauer
  - Vice Mayor: Debbie Hunseder
  - City Council: Marney Babbitt-Pierce; Lisa O'Neill; Laura Jones

Area
  - Total: 10.32 sq mi (26.74 km^{2})
  - Land: 10.18 sq mi (26.36 km^{2})
  - Water: 0.15 sq mi (0.38 km^{2})
- Elevation: 3,586 ft (1,093 m)

Population (2020)
  - Total: 4,424
  - Density: 434.7/sq mi (167.83/km^{2})
- Time zone: UTC-7 (MST)
- ZIP code: 86324
- Area code: 928
- FIPS code: 04-13890
- GNIS feature ID: 2413206
- Website: Town of Clarkdale

Clarkdale is a town in Yavapai County, Arizona, United States. The Verde River flows through the town as does Bitter Creek, an intermittent tributary of the river. According to the 2021 census, the population of the town was 4,419.

Clarkdale, formerly a copper-smelting town, has become largely a retirement community and arts community.

== History ==
Clarkdale was founded in 1912 as a company smelter town by William A. Clark, for his copper mine in nearby Jerome. Clarkdale was one of the most modern mining towns in the world, including telephone, telegraph, electrical, sewer and spring water services, and was an early example of a planned community. The Clark Mansion, a local landmark, was built in the late 1920s by William Clark III, Clark's grandson and heir to the United Verde Copper Company. The structure, east of town across the Verde River near Pecks Lake, was destroyed in 2010 by a fire of "suspicious" origin.

The town center and business district were built in Spanish Colonial style, and feature the Clark Memorial Clubhouse and Memorial Library, both still in use. The Clubhouse is listed on the National Register of Historic Places. The entire original town site is also on the National Register as the Clarkdale Historic District.

The mine and smelter closed in 1953, and Clarkdale entered hard times. Clarkdale was bought and sold by several different companies. In 1957, Clarkdale was incorporated as a town. The 1959 construction of the Phoenix Cement Company (renamed Salt River Materials Group) plant restored a modest prosperity to the community.

Clarkdale was a segregated town for much of its early history. Mexican and Mexican-American laborers were restricted to living in Patio Town (see neighborhoods), with a separate swimming pool and park; the town swimming pool was marked "whites only." Additionally, Upper Clarkdale was designated for engineers and executives, while Lower Clarkdale was for the "working class."

A portion of the Apache Nation is within Clarkdale's boundaries.

== Geography ==
According to the United States Census Bureau, Clarkdale has a total area of 7.5 square miles (19 km^{2}), of which 7.3 square miles (19 km^{2}) is land and 0.2 square miles (0.5 km^{2}) is water.

Clarkdale is at 3,545 feet (1,081 m) above sea level at the confluence of Bitter Creek and the Verde River in Yavapai County, northern Arizona. The town is about 40 miles (64 km) southwest of Flagstaff and about 90 miles (140 km) north of Phoenix. Arizona Route 89A skirts the town on its south edge, while Historic Route 89A passes through Clarkdale. Nearby towns include Jerome, about 4 miles (6.4 km) to the southwest, and Cottonwood, about 4 miles (6.4 km) to the southeast.

Tuzigoot National Monument, a 42-acre (17 ha) Sinagua pueblo ruin, is between Clarkdale and Cottonwood, Arizona, on land donated to the National Park Service by Phelps Dodge in 1938.

Sycamore Canyon Wilderness lies several miles north of town. Sycamore Creek, which flows through the wilderness, enters the Verde River canyon about 6.5 miles (10.5 km) north-northwest of Clarkdale.

=== Climate ===
The average temperature in Clarkdale in January is 45 °F or 7.2 °C, and in July it is 84 °F or 28.9 °C. The highest recorded temperature for the town was 118 °F or 47.8 °C in 1994, and the lowest was 8 °F or −13.3 °C in 1990. The wettest month is August, averaging about 2 inches or 50 millimetres of precipitation. In the Köppen Climate Classification system, Clarkdale has a cool semi-arid climate, abbreviated BSk on climate maps.

Little snow falls in Clarkdale. Between 1949 and 1977, Cottonwood, Clarkdale's close neighbor, received an average of about 4 inches or 0.10 metres of snow a year. About half of this fell in December. The average snow depth in Cottonwood during the period of record was reported as zero.

Climate data for Clarkdale, Arizona
Month	Jan	Feb	Mar	Apr	May	Jun	Jul	Aug	Sep	Oct	Nov	Dec	Year
Mean daily maximum °F (°C)	60 (16)	63 (17)	69 (21)	78 (26)	88 (31)	97 (36)	100 (38)	97 (36)	92 (33)	81 (27)	69 (21)	58 (14)	79 (26)
Mean daily minimum °F (°C)	30 (−1)	34 (1)	38 (3)	44 (7)	52 (11)	60 (16)	67 (19)	66 (19)	59 (15)	47 (8)	36 (2)	30 (−1)	47 (8)
Average precipitation inches (mm)	1.16 (29)	1.15 (29)	1.08 (27)	0.59 (15)	0.35 (8.9)	0.22 (5.6)	1.69 (43)	2.02 (51)	1.52 (39)	1.02 (26)	0.79 (20)	1.16 (29)	12.75 (322.5)
Source: The Weather Channel

== Commerce ==
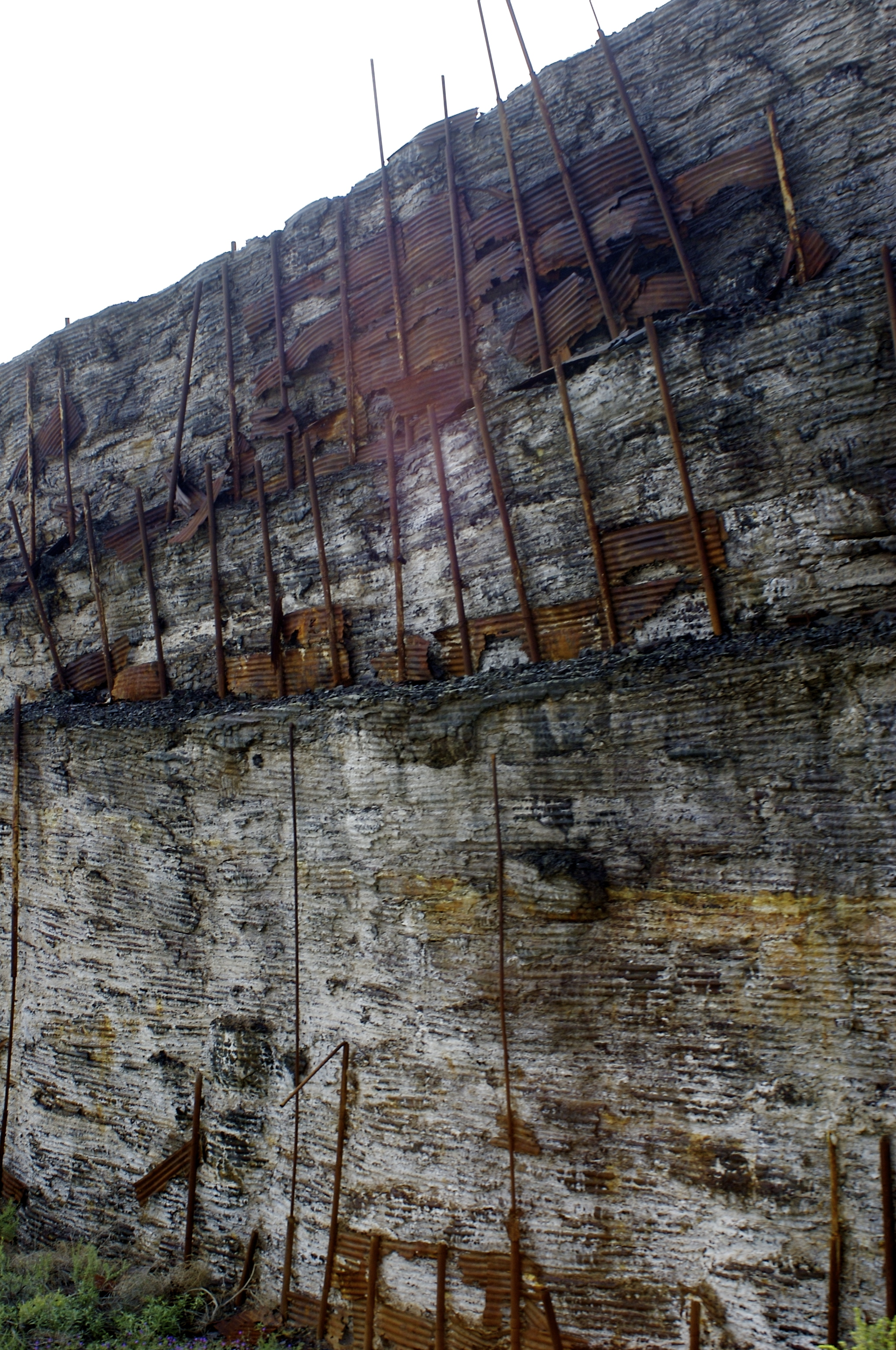
A slag heap in Clarkdale

Despite Clarkdale's proximity to the former copper-mining town of Jerome, its miners (and prospectors, promoters and finance representatives) rarely frequented Clarkdale. Jerome could be approached via Clarkdale on the Verde Valley Railroad but, due to the prevailing train schedules, there was no time-saving, financial or energy benefit in doing so. Clarkdale was otherwise busy, however.

The Salt River Materials Group (formerly Phoenix Cement Co.) is Clarkdale's only major industry. The cement plant was built in 1959 to supply Portland cement for the construction of Glen Canyon Dam and is owned by the Salt River Pima-Maricopa Indian Community. Clarkdale is home to the Verde Canyon Railroad, a scenic excursion train that follows part of the route of the Verde Valley Railroad, constructed in 1911–12 to serve Clark's mine and smelter, to Drake and Perkinsville, which became ghost towns. Yavapai College also has a campus in Clarkdale.

Several motion pictures have been shot in Clarkdale, including Desert Fury, Midnight Run, Universal Soldier and Brothel.

== Arts ==
The Made in Clarkdale organization hosts an annual invitational art show each December in the Clark Memorial Clubhouse. and free concerts are offered in Clarkdale Park through the summer months. The Arizona Copper Art Museum is located in the city.

== Neighborhoods ==
Clarkdale's neighborhoods are not strictly defined, but include:

- Upper Clarkdale, the oldest part of the historic section of town, from 9th Street/Miller's Hill west to 16th Street.
- Lower Clarkdale, east of 9th Street/Miller's Hill, along Main Street to 4th Street and the railroad tracks.
- Riverfront, between 4th Street/railroad and the Verde River (sometimes included in Lower Clarkdale).
- Patio Town, later referred to as Patio Park, across Bitter Creek between the train depot area and the river.
- Centerville, the oldest development not in the historic site, along Avenida Centerville off of Arizona State Route 89A. Said to be named for its location at the geographical center of Arizona.
- Foothills Terrace, a development west of Arizona State Route 89A along Lisa Street and Lanny Lane.
- Black Hills, north of Black Hills Drive and west of Old Jerome Highway. Site of Yavapai College's Clarkdale campus.
- Bent River, east of Broadway (Historic US Route 89A) along Bent River Road and Old Clarkdale Highway.
- Verde Palisades, west of Broadway along Palisade Drive.
- Giant's Grave, on a bluff north of Arizona State Route 89A along Panorama Way.
- Newer developments, including Lampliter Village, Pine Shadows, Mingus Shadows, Mingus View Estates, Mountain Gate, and Crossroads at Mingus.
- Individual homes in un-subdivided areas, including Haskell Springs, Hawk Hollow Way and Mescal Wash/Tavasci Road.

== Education ==
Much of Clarkdale is in the Clarkdale-Jerome Elementary School District. That district operates Clarkdale–Jerome School in Clarkdale, a facility which also takes students from Jerome. The public school has enrollment from kindergarten to eighth grade. A portion of Clarkdale is in the Cottonwood-Oak Creek Elementary School District.

All of Clarkdale is in Mingus Union High School District. Mingus Union High School in Cottonwood takes Clarkdale high school students. There are also charter schools in Cottonwood. In addition, Yavapai College has a community college campus in Clarkdale. The campus is home to the newly opened Southwest Wine Center.

Historically, Clarkdale had an elementary school, located in Lower Clarkdale, a junior high school, located at the top of Miller's Hill in Upper Clarkdale, and a high school, next to the junior high school. Clarkdale High School combined with Mingus High School in Jerome in 1960 to form Mingus Union High School, then located in Jerome. The combined high school adopted the name of the Jerome school and the colors of the Clarkdale school. The school then moved to Cottonwood in 1972. In 1983, the junior high school burned down. A new elementary school was built, becoming the K-8 school at 16th and Main Streets in Upper Clarkdale in 1985.

== Demographics ==
Historical population
Census	Pop.	Note	%±
1920	2,435		—
1930	5,526		126.9%
1950	1,609		—
1960	1,095		−31.9%
1970	892		−18.5%
1980	1,512		69.5%
1990	2,144		41.8%
2000	3,422		59.6%
2010	4,097		19.7%
2020	4,424		8.0%
U.S. Decennial Census

=== 2020 census ===
As of the 2020 census, Clarkdale had a population of 4,424. The median age was 55.6 years. 16.9% of residents were under the age of 18 and 34.0% of residents were 65 years of age or older. For every 100 females there were 92.5 males, and for every 100 females age 18 and over there were 90.4 males age 18 and over.

92.8% of residents lived in urban areas, while 7.2% lived in rural areas.

There were 1,980 households in Clarkdale, of which 20.3% had children under the age of 18 living in them. Of all households, 48.4% were married-couple households, 16.9% were households with a male householder and no spouse or partner present, and 26.3% were households with a female householder and no spouse or partner present. About 28.7% of all households were made up of individuals and 16.3% had someone living alone who was 65 years of age or older.

There were 2,176 housing units, of which 9.0% were vacant. The homeowner vacancy rate was 0.9% and the rental vacancy rate was 7.2%.

Racial composition as of the 2020 census
Race	Number	Percent
White	3,445	77.9%
Black or African American	27	0.6%
American Indian and Alaska Native	213	4.8%
Asian	46	1.0%
Native Hawaiian and Other Pacific Islander	7	0.2%
Some other race	234	5.3%
Two or more races	452	10.2%
Hispanic or Latino (of any race)	616	13.9%

=== 2000 census ===
As of the census of 2000, there were 3,422 people, 1,433 households, and 994 families residing in the town. The population density was 466.9 inhabitants per square mile (180.3/km^{2}). There were 1,546 housing units at an average density of 210.9 per square mile (81.4/km^{2}). The racial makeup of the town was 84.5% White, 0.3% Black or African American, 6.8% Native American, 0.4% Asian, 0.1% Pacific Islander, 5.4% from other races, and 2.6% from two or more races. 11.8% of the population were Hispanic or Latino of any race.

There were 1,433 households, out of which 22.7% had children under the age of 18 living with them, 58.2% were married couples living together, 7.1% had a female householder with no husband present, and 30.6% were non-families. 25.3% of all households were made up of individuals, and 14.0% had someone living alone who was 65 years of age or older. The average household size was 2.39 and the average family size was 2.82.

In the town, the population was spread out, with 21.5% under the age of 18, 6.2% from 18 to 24, 20.4% from 25 to 44, 26.0% from 45 to 64, and 25.9% who were 65 years of age or older. The median age was 46 years. For every 100 females, there were 93.1 males. For every 100 females age 18 and over, there were 89.6 males.

The median income for a household in the town was $34,911, and the median income for a family was $41,250. Males had a median income of $28,824 versus $21,811 for females. The per capita income for the town was $18,441. About 7.4% of families and 10.3% of the population were below the poverty line, including 10.9% of those under age 18 and 7.0% of those age 65 or over.

Clarkdale became one of the municipalities in Arizona to recognize civil unions for same-sex partners and opposite-sex partners seeking a form of recognition other than marriage.

== See also ==
- List of historic properties in Clarkdale, Arizona
