= Mingus Union High School =

Secondary school in Yavapai County, Arizona

Location
- 1801 E Fir St; Cottonwood, Arizona 86326; United States; 34°43′3″N 112°0′17″W

Information
- School type: Public high school
- Established: 1958 (68 years ago)
- School board: Carol Anne Teague, President; Lori Drake, Vice-President; Stephen Currie, Member; Greg Roeller, Member; Anthony Lozano, Member
- School district: Mingus Union High School District #4
- Superintendent: Luis Morales
- CEEB code: 030050
- Principal: David Berry
- Staff: 55.75 (FTE)
- Grades: 9-12
- Enrollment: 1,201 (2023–2024)
- Student to teacher ratio: 21.54
- Colors: Red and gray
- Mascot: Marauders
- Accreditation: North Central Association
- Website: www.mingusunion.com

Mingus Union High School is a high school in Cottonwood, Arizona. It is one of two high schools in the Mingus Union High School District. It is a Title I school serving the Cottonwood, Camp Verde, Beaver Creek, and Sedona areas.

== History ==
There were once three separate high schools in the Verde Valley of Arizona — Jerome, Clarkdale and Cottonwood. In 1950, Jerome and Clarkdale consolidated into "Mingus High School", and in 1958, Cottonwood High School was added, creating the new Mingus Union High School.

Citizens pushed to create a new high school district instead of consolidating both the Jerome-Clarkdale and Cottonwood school districts completely. This happened in 1957 and 1958. The school district briefly took the "Union High School District" name, but this was changed to the present Mingus Union before the district became official.

The high school was located in Clarkdale until 1960. From then until the start of the 1972 school year, it was housed in Jerome's school buildings. It then moved to Cottonwood.

In a previous period, before the 1991 establishment of Sedona-Oak Creek Unified School District, some Sedona area students attended school in this district. When Sedona-Oak Creek USD opened in 1991, it took territory from the Mingus high school district.

== Operations ==
As of 2019 the school has different colors for badges of upperclassman (grades 11–12) and underclassman (grades 9–10) students. The school requires people who would otherwise be upperclassmen to wear the ID colors of underclassmen if they lack sufficient credits. The Phoenix New Times printed an article discussing a parent's concerns that this could indirectly lead to shaming of some students; the family contacted the ACLU to get a remedy. https://www.acluaz.org/sites/default/files/2018.12.28_letter_to_muhsd_re_scarlet_badge_policy.pdf
