= List of historic properties in Cave Creek, Arizona =

- Town
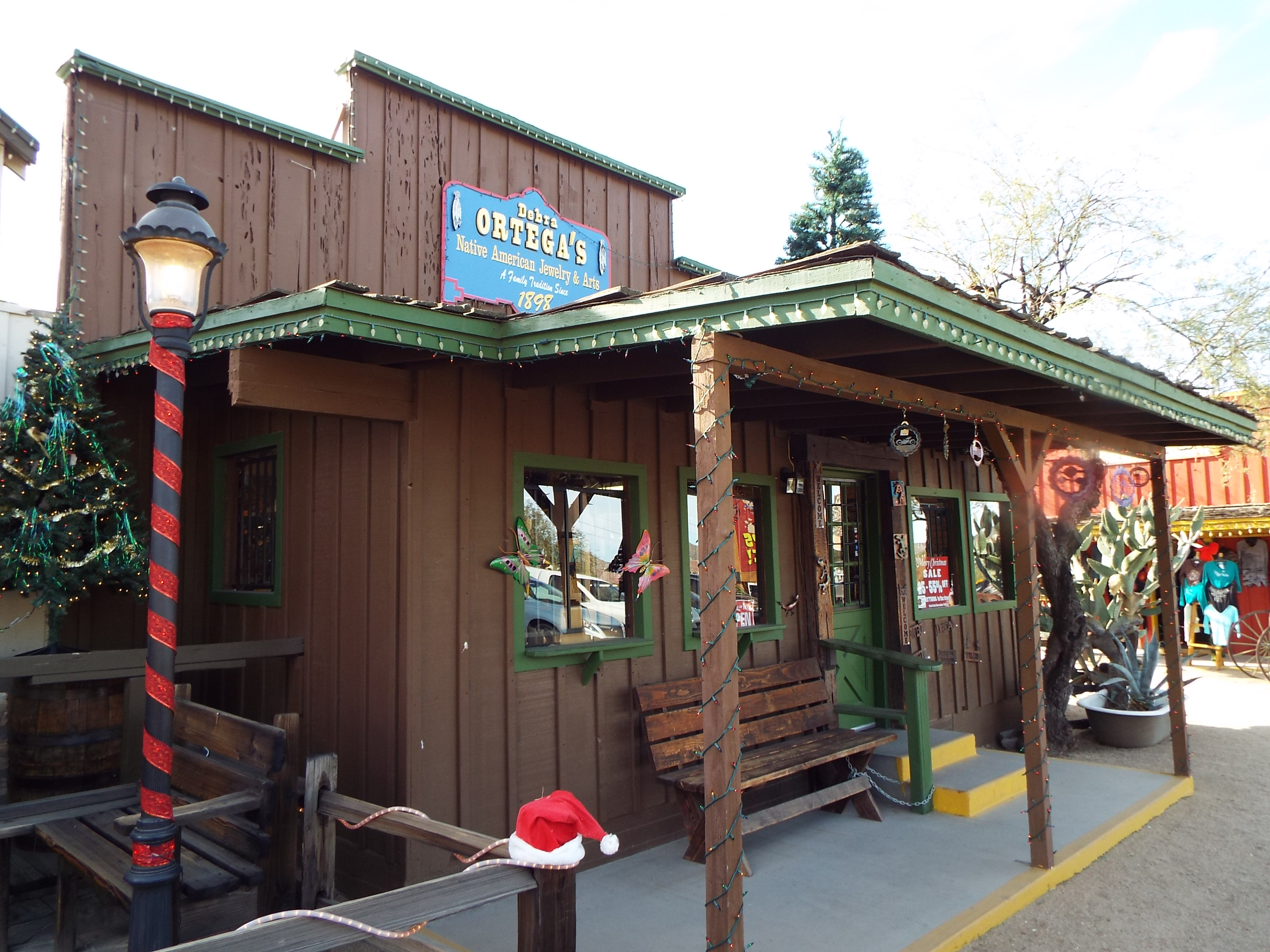
- Original 1890 Cave Creek house (Now a Native-American jewelry store)

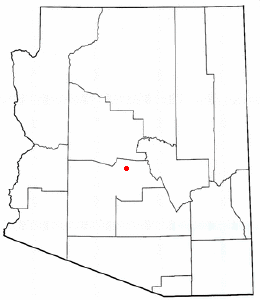
- Location in Maricopa County and the state of Arizona

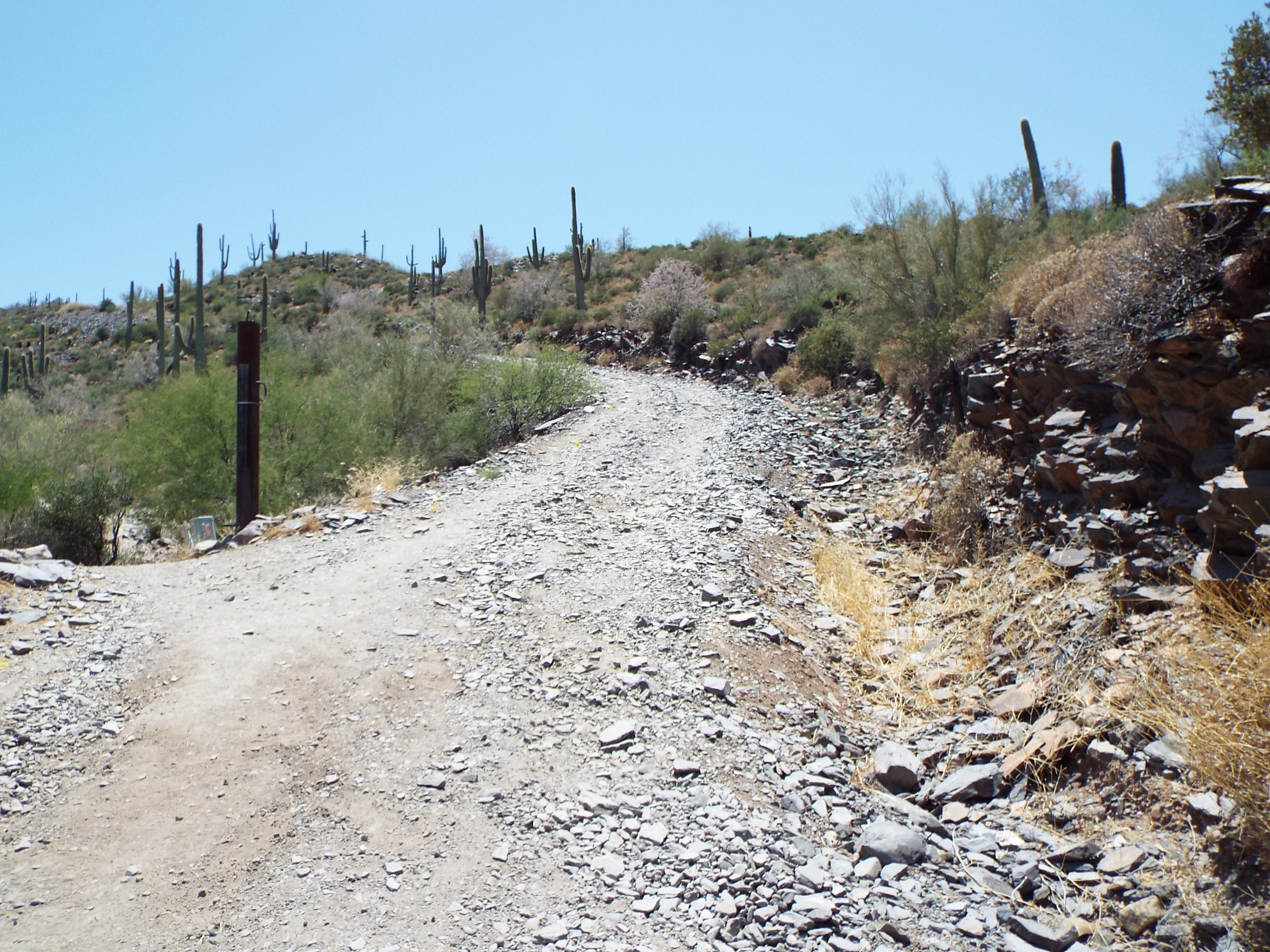
The Stoneman Military Trail" in the Black Mountains

This is a list, which includes a photographic gallery, of some of the remaining structures and monuments, of historic significance in Cave Creek, a town in Maricopa County, Arizona. Cave Creek was first inhabited by the ancient Native-American tribe known as the Hohokam. The area, which in the 1800s belonged to Mexico, was ceded to the United States in what is known as the Mexican Cession of 1848. Cave Creek is located within the area which became known as the United States Territory of Arizona. In 1986, The Town of Cave Creek was incorporated. Some of the structures are listed in the National Register of Historic Properties.

== Brief history ==
Cave Creek and the surrounding area was inhabited by the members of the Hohokam Indians. Hohokam is a Pima (O'odham) word used by archaeologists to identify a group of people who lived in the Sonoran Desert of North America. The Hohokam may have been the ancestors of the historic Akimel O'odham (Pima) and Tohono O'odham peoples in Southern Arizona. The reason for which the Hohokam abandoned the area is unknown. The Tonto Apaches claimed the land.

Major General George S. Stoneman was the commanding officer of the U.S. Cavalry stationed in Camp McDowell (later renamed Fort McDowell) in what was then the United States Territory of Arizona. He wanted to establish a trail which would serve as a short cut between Camp McDowell and Fort Whipple in Prescott, Arizona. In 1865, he investigated an old Native-American trail which cut through the McDowell Mountains, a chain of extinct volcanic mountains and Black Mountain of the modern day Cities of Fountain Hills and Cave Creek. The trail was named the "Stoneman Military Trail". He found an area bordering a flowing creek with bubbling springs which would in the future be known as Cave Creek. Soon, Anglos began to settle the area and by 1877, a married couple by the names of Jeriah and Amanda Wood established the "Cave Creek Station". The station was a lodge where travelers could dine and stay overnight.

== Mining ==
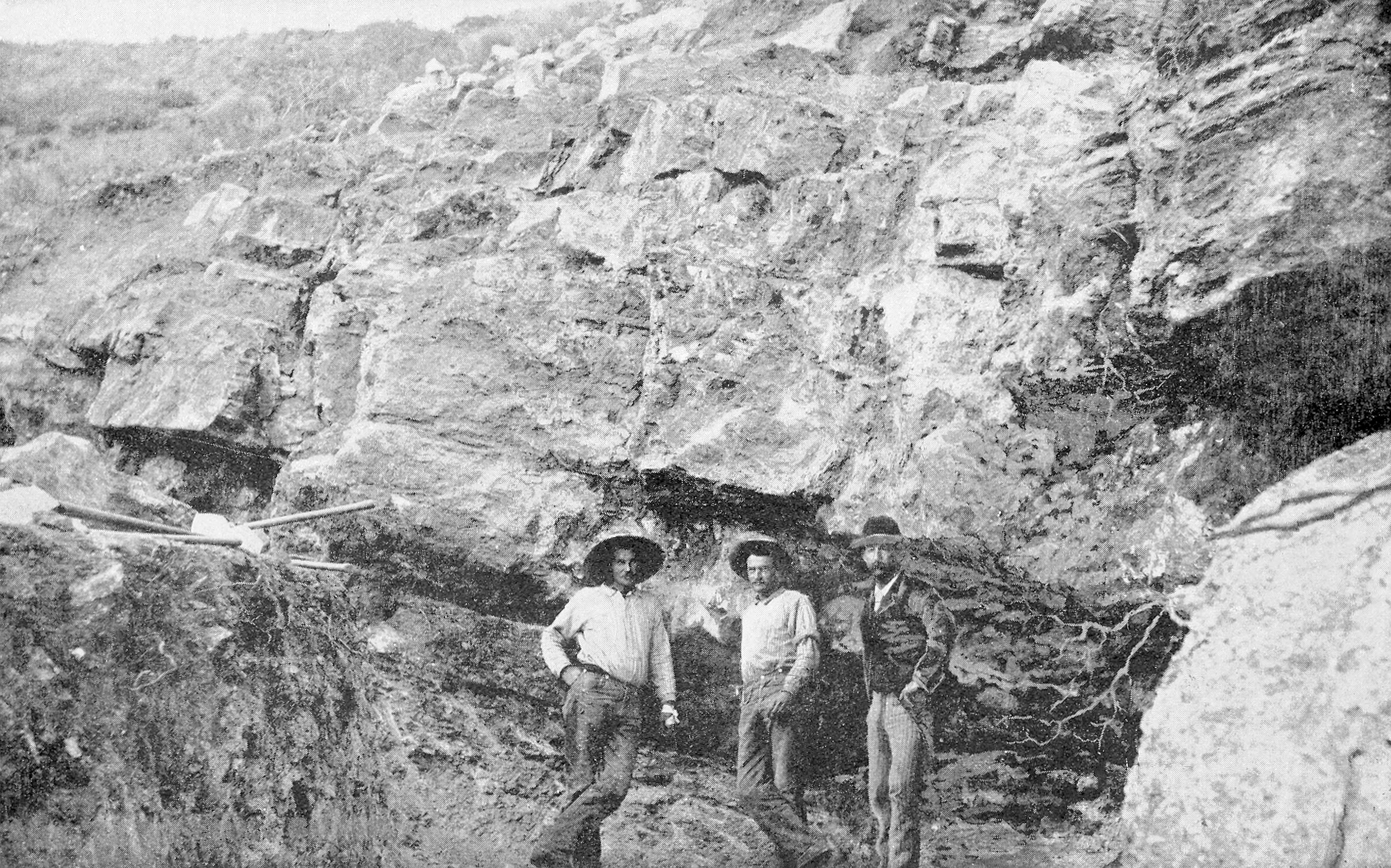
Quarry opening at Cave Creek, 1893

In 1873, Cave Creek established the Cave Creek Mining District in an area which covered 144 square miles. William Rowe located a rich gold mine on Gold Hill in 1874. This attracted miners and settlers to the area. The first recorded gold mine in the area was called the Continental. Another mine called the Golden Reef Mine was established. In 1880, the Golden Reef Stamp Mill was built in California and sent to Cave Creek. The mine also had a tramway car system on its grounds. The invasion of new settlers to the area irritated the Tonto Apaches. This was one of the factors which played a role in what became known as the "Cave Creek Ambush". In 1882, the last skirmish of the Apache Wars between the 5th U.S. Cavalry, under the command of Lt. Walter S. Schuyler, and the Tonto Apaches was fought in Cave Creek. The Golden Reef Mine closed in 1993 and both the stamp mill and tramway car were donated to the Cave Creek Museum.

== Cave Creek Museum ==
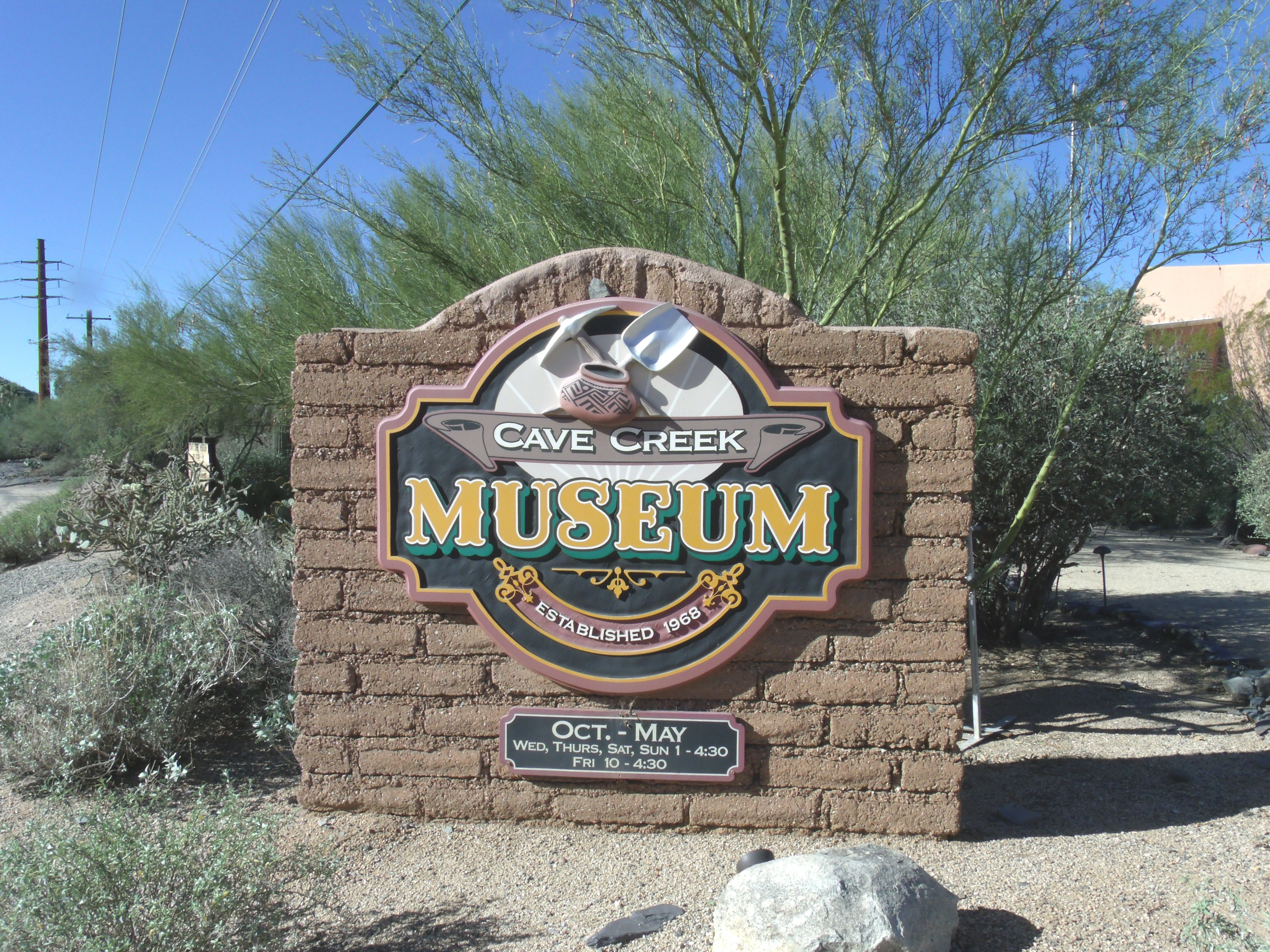
Cave Creek Museum entrance.

The land south of the Black Mountain was opened in 1920 for homesteading. The climate of the area was considered favorable for those who suffered of tuberculosis and soon tuberculosis cabins were built in Cave Creek. Located on the grounds of the Cave Creek Museum is a Tubercular Cabin, which is listed in the National Register of Historic Places. The cabin was one of the cabins belonging to the Desmount Sanitarium, built in 1920. The Cave Creek Museum was opened in 1970 by the Cave Creek historical society. The society was established in 1968. Also among its outside exhibits are the First Church of Cave Creek, which was built in 1947; the Golden Reef Stamp Mill and the Cave Creek Bandshell which was built in 1900 and originally located in downtown Cave Creek. The museum also has an Arrastre, which in Spanish means "to drag". The Arrastre, a crude crushing mill run by burro or oxen, was built in 1900.

== Other properties and artifacts ==
Cave Creek's preservation office does not have the ability to deny a demolition permit. Therefore, the owner of a property, listed either in the National Register of Historic Places, may demolish the historical property if he or she so wishes. According to Jim McPherson, Arizona Preservation Foundation Board President:

It is crucial that residents, private interests, and government officials act now to save these elements of our cultural heritage before it is too late.

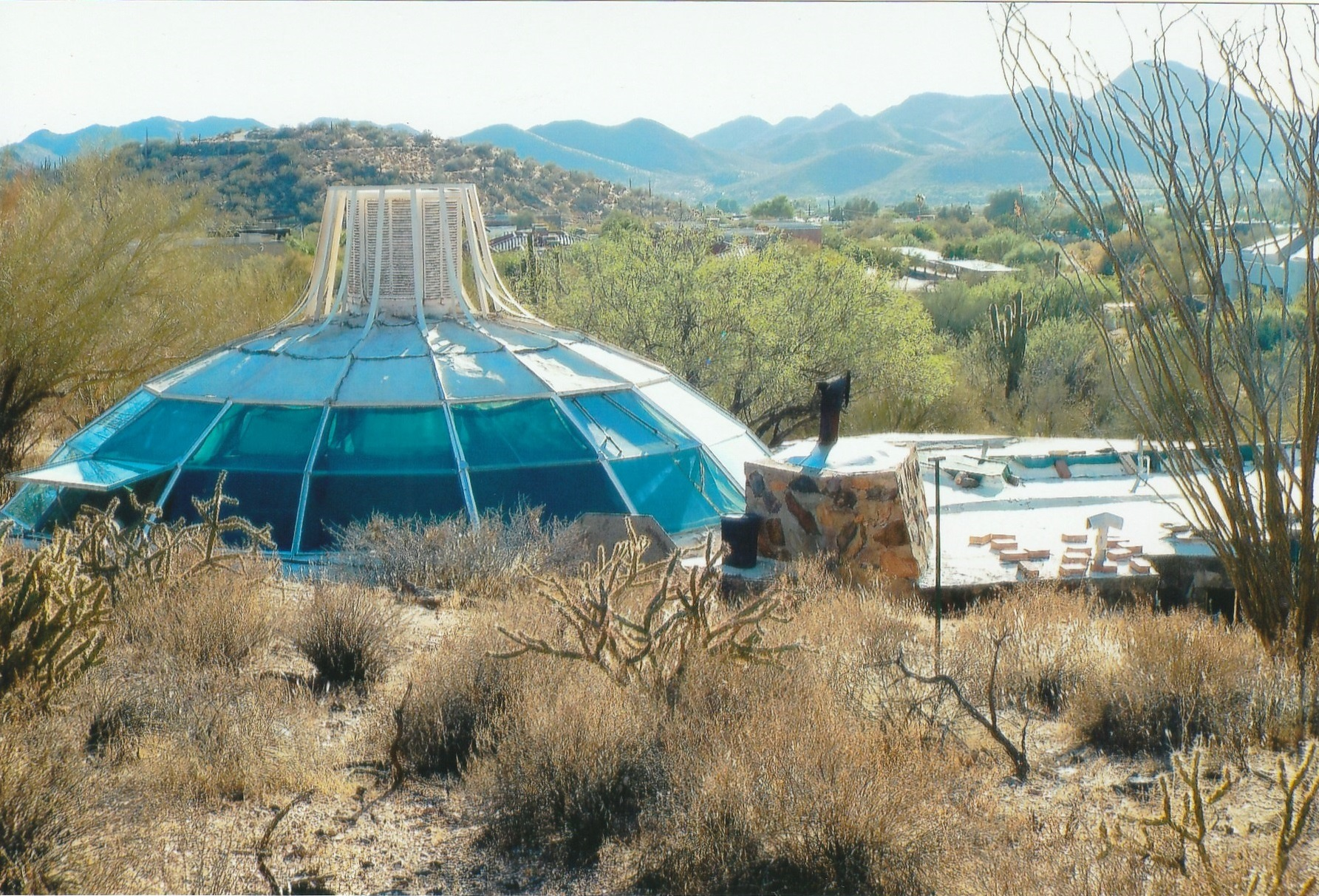
Dome in the Desert House

There are various historic properties and artifacts in the town of Cave Creek. Two of the historic properties have been converted into restaurants. They are the Cave Creek Inn and the Cave Creek Service Station. The Cave Creek Inn was built in 1920 and is Cave Creek's longest operating commercial building. It is now occupied by a restaurant. The Cave Creek Service Station was built in 1925. It was listed in the National Register of Historic Places in 2000. Frontier Town, which is also pictured, is located at 6245 E. Cave Creek Road. Frontier Town has some of the original structures of Cave Creek on its compound. Among the historic structures in the "town" is the former Leather Mill building which was built in the late 1880s and is one of the original extant buildings in Cave Creek. Also, a 1936 Works Progress Administration (WPA) outhouse is exhibited as an attraction.

On March 15, 2018, "The Dome in the Desert" a.k.a. "The Dome" was listed in the National Register of Historic Places, reference #100002208. The Dome was built in 1949, and is located at 7199 E. Grapevine Road. Its name comes from its shape and it function. The historical significance of this structure is the ideas and concepts that Paolo Soleri & Mark Mills implemented to create a dwelling that is functional to desert living.

== Historic structures and artifacts ==
The following are the images of the Cave Creek Museum and some of Cave Creek's historic structures and artifacts.

Historic Cave Creek, Arizona

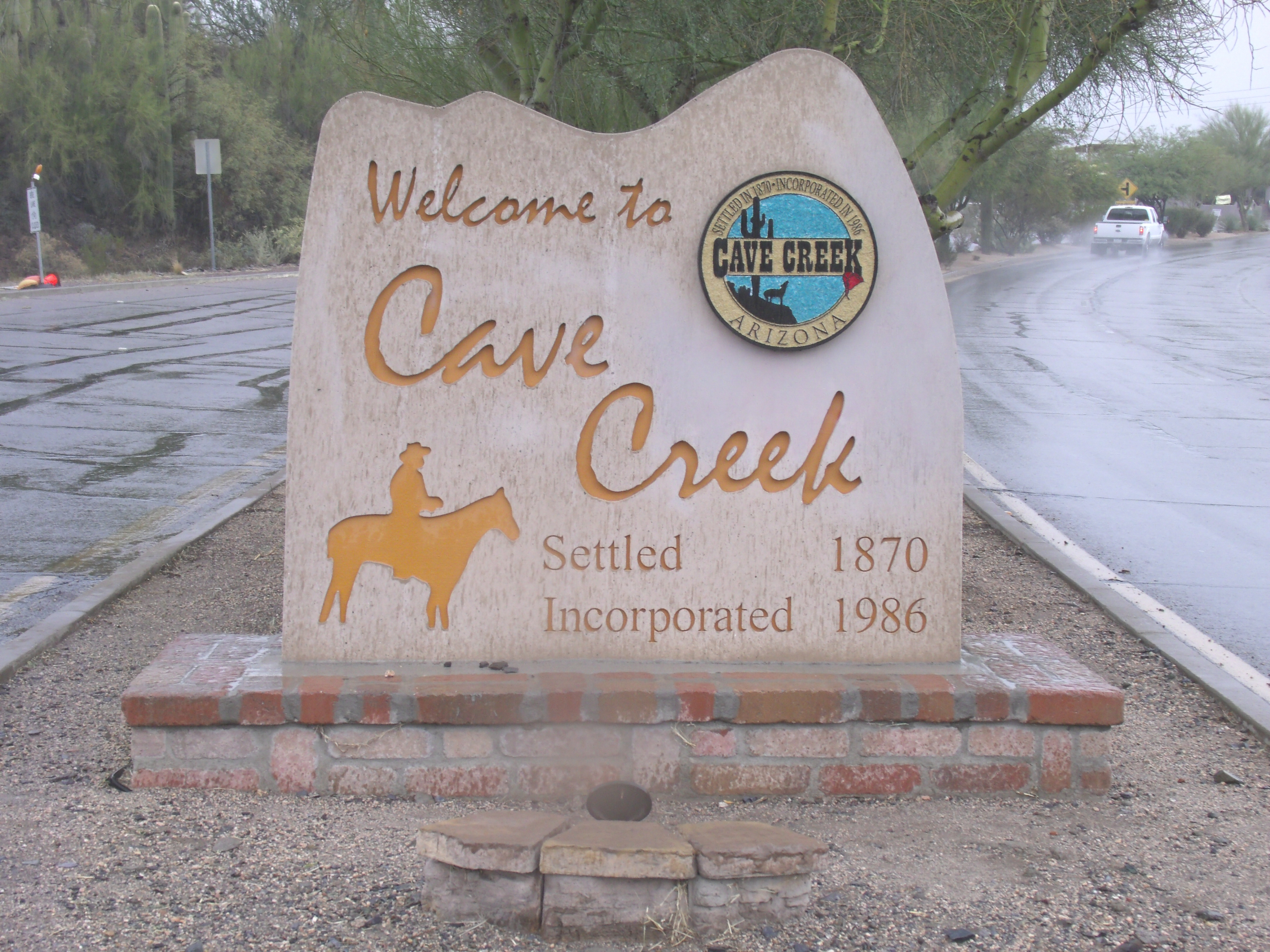
Welcome to Cave Creek Marker

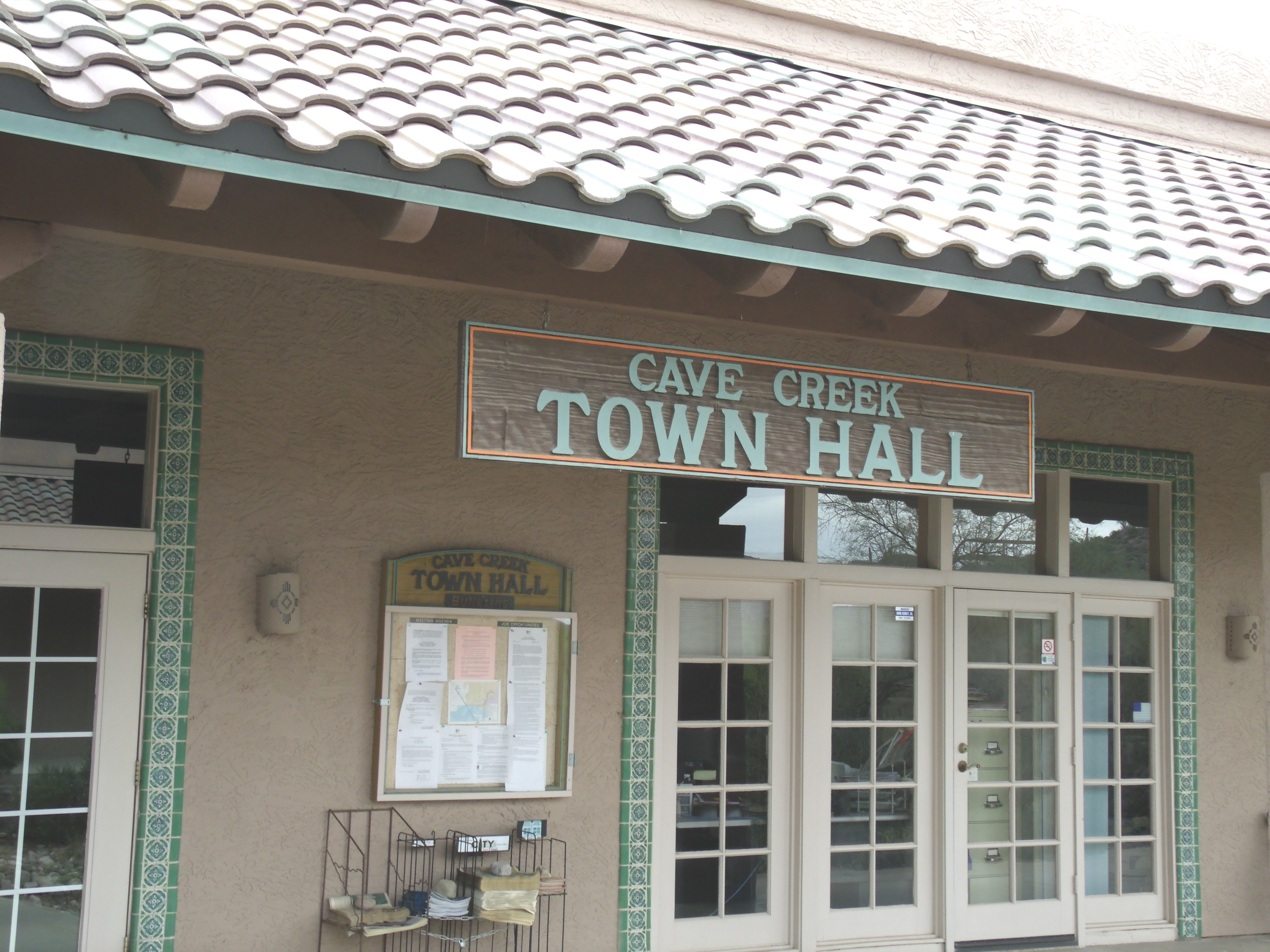
Cave Creek Town Hall, listed on the National Register of Historic Places (NRHP).

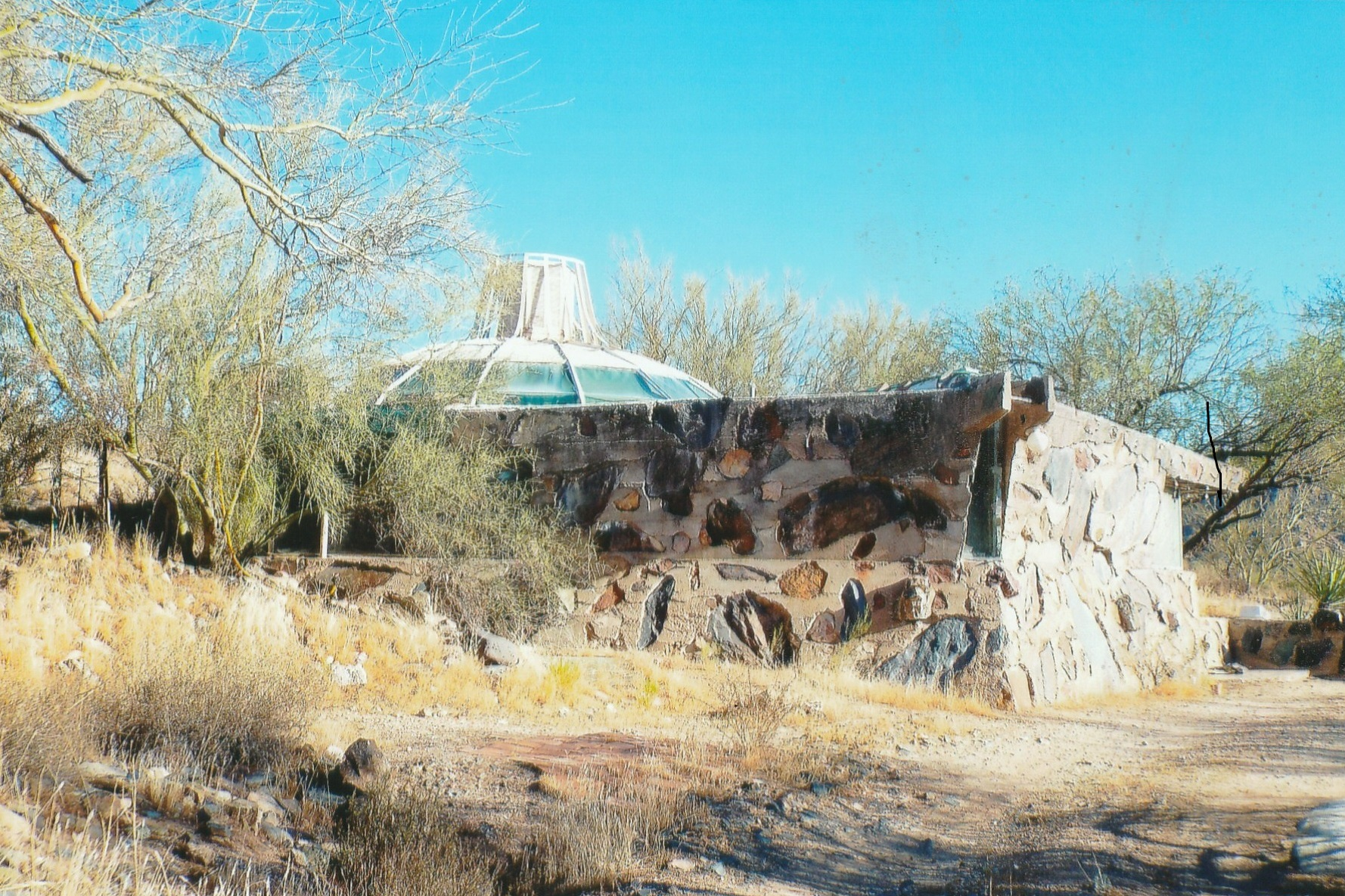
Dome in the Desert House "NRHP".

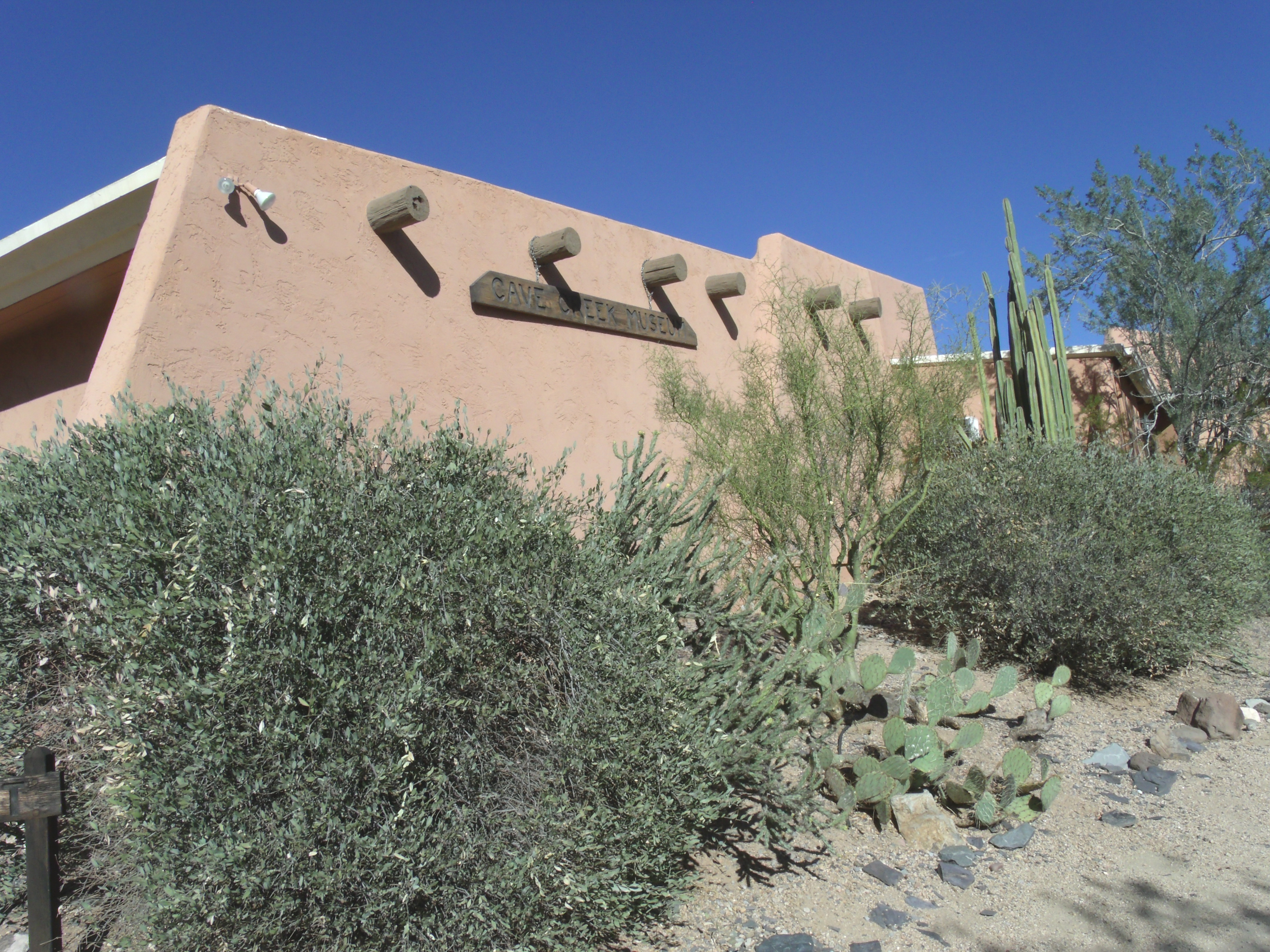
The Cave Creek Museum.

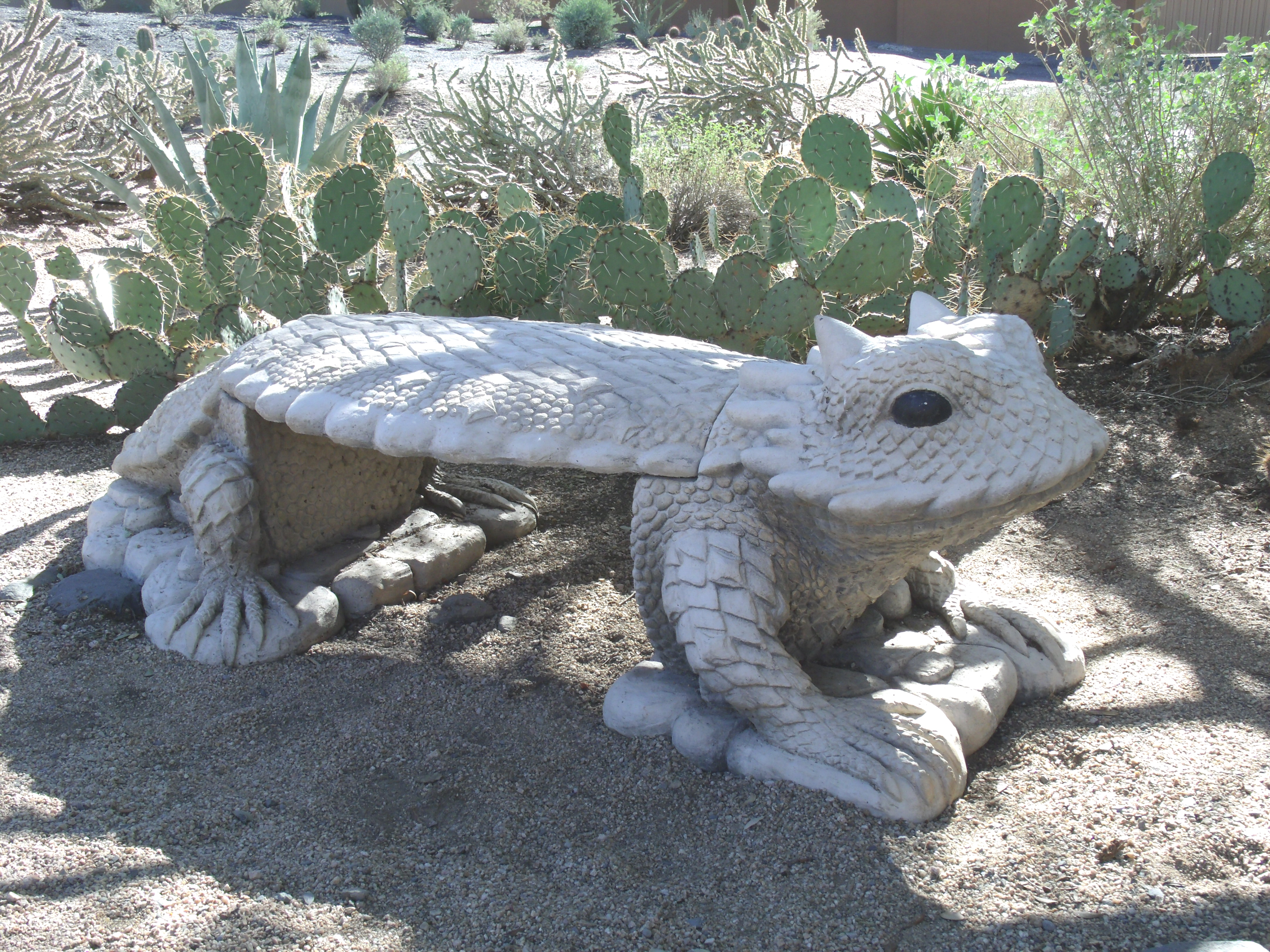
Cave Creek Museum lizard bench.

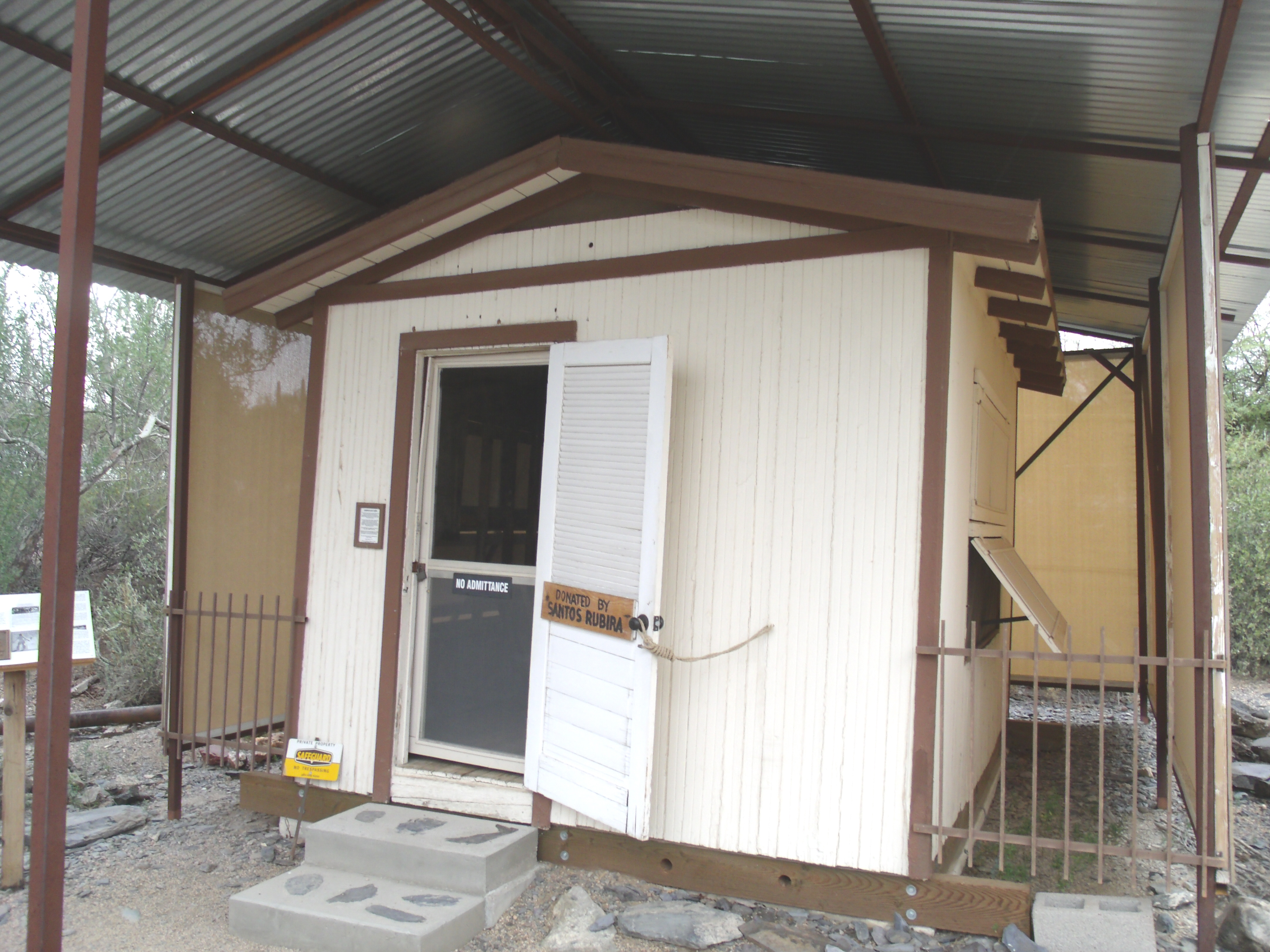
The Tubercular Cabin.

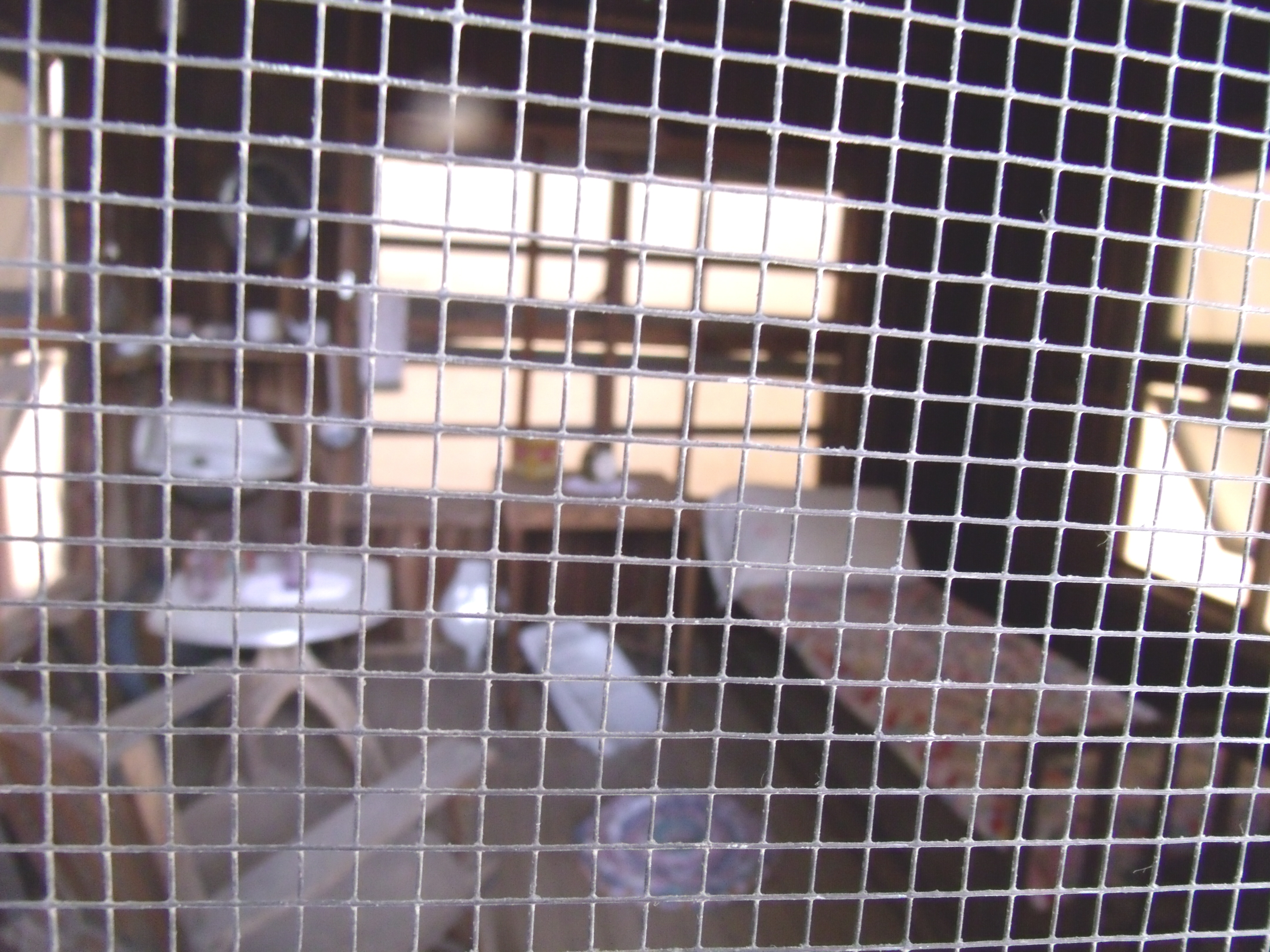
Inside the Tubercular Cabin.

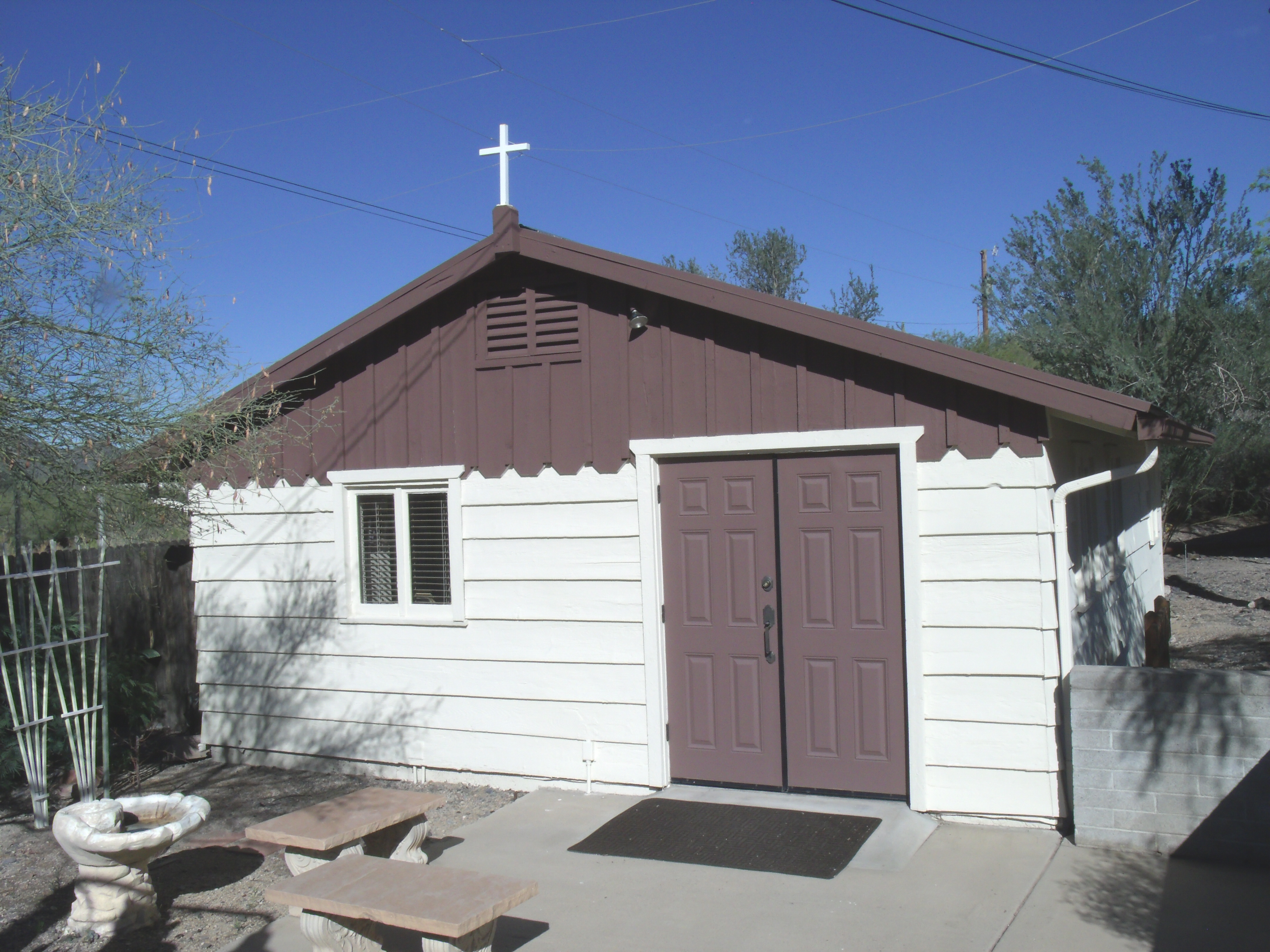
The First Church of Cave Creek, also known as Good Shepherd of the Hills Episcopal Church, was built in 1948.

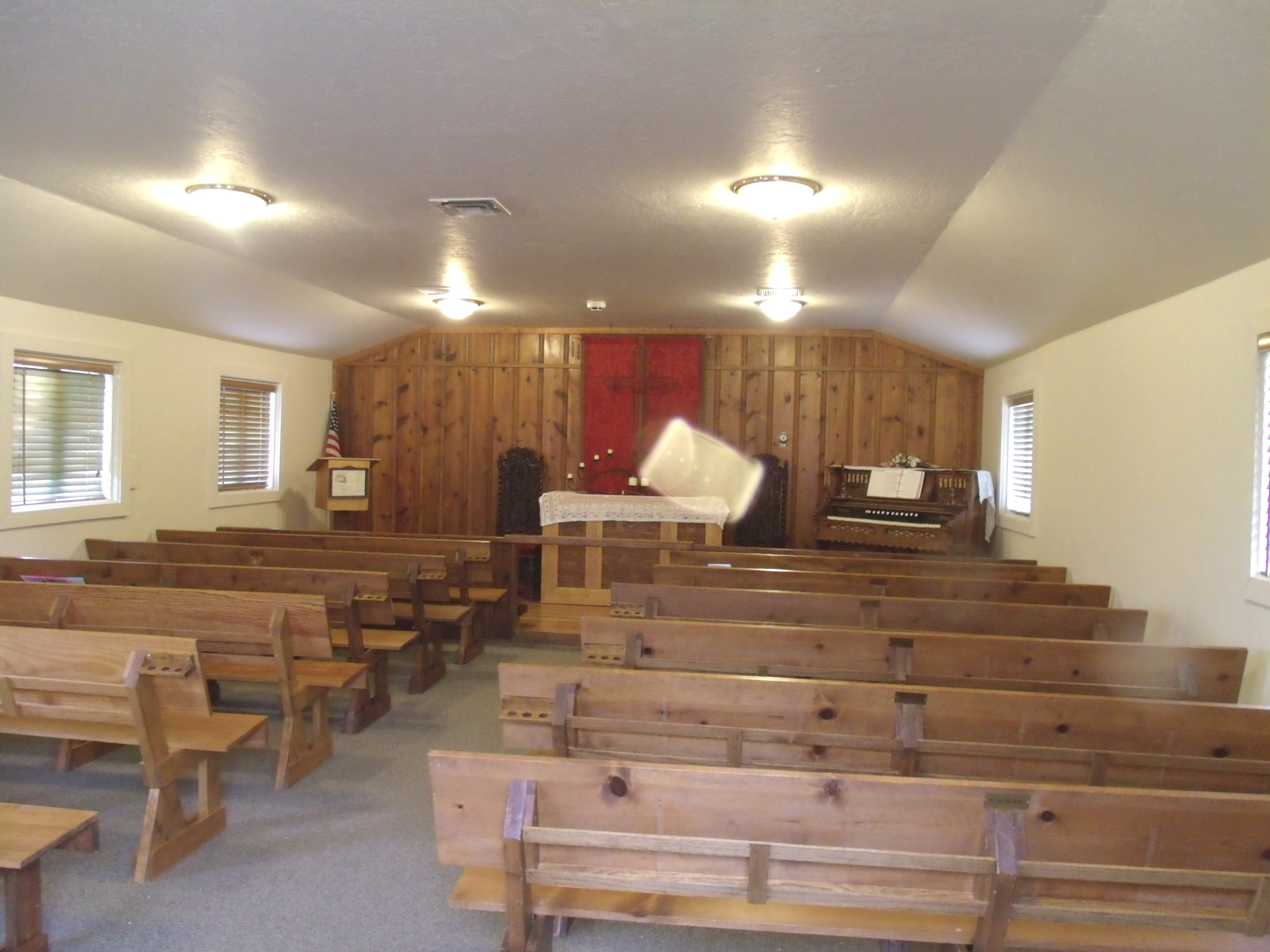
Inside the First Church of Cave Creek.

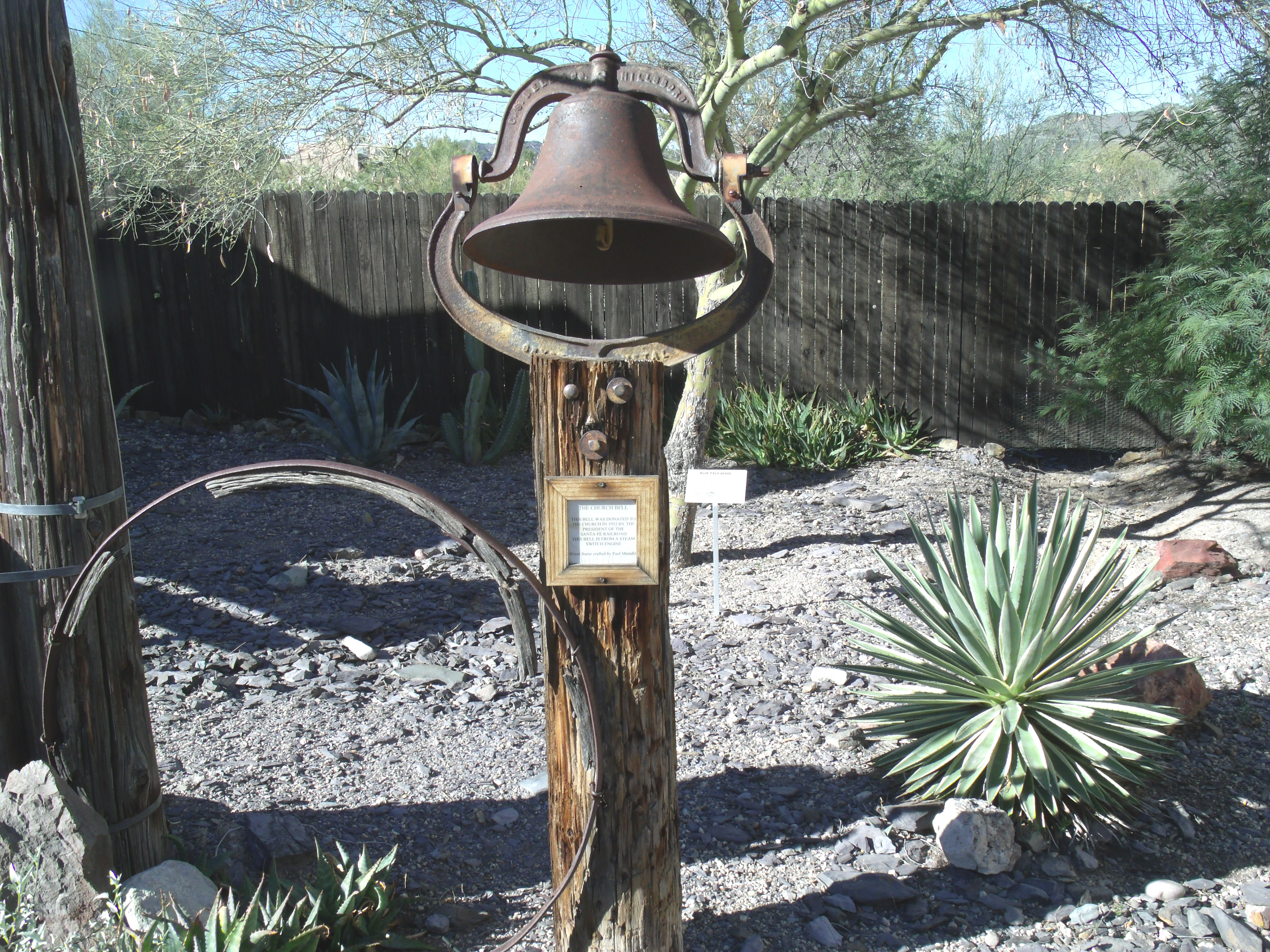
The original bell of the First Church of Cave Creek.

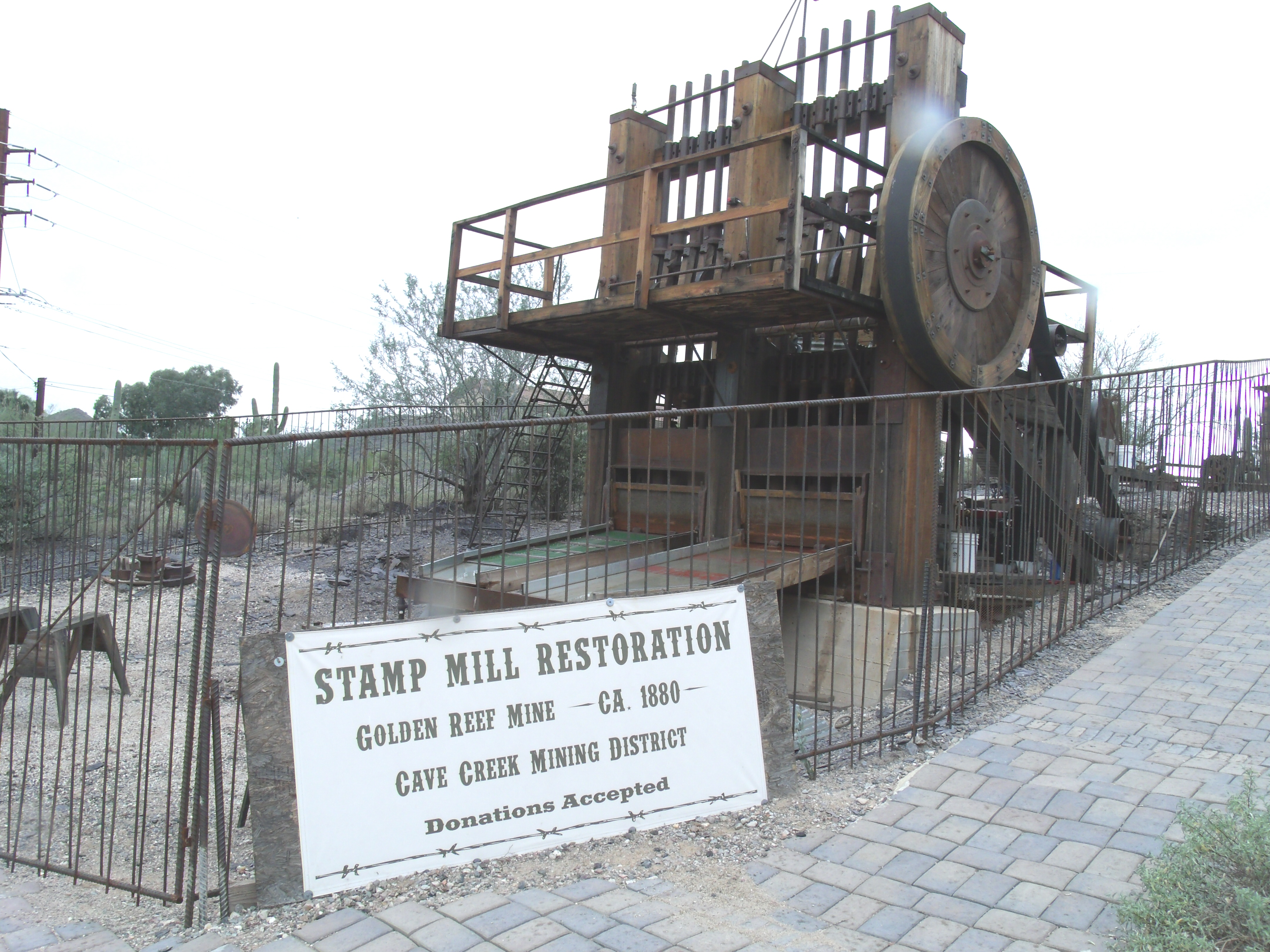
The Golden Reef Stamp Mill.

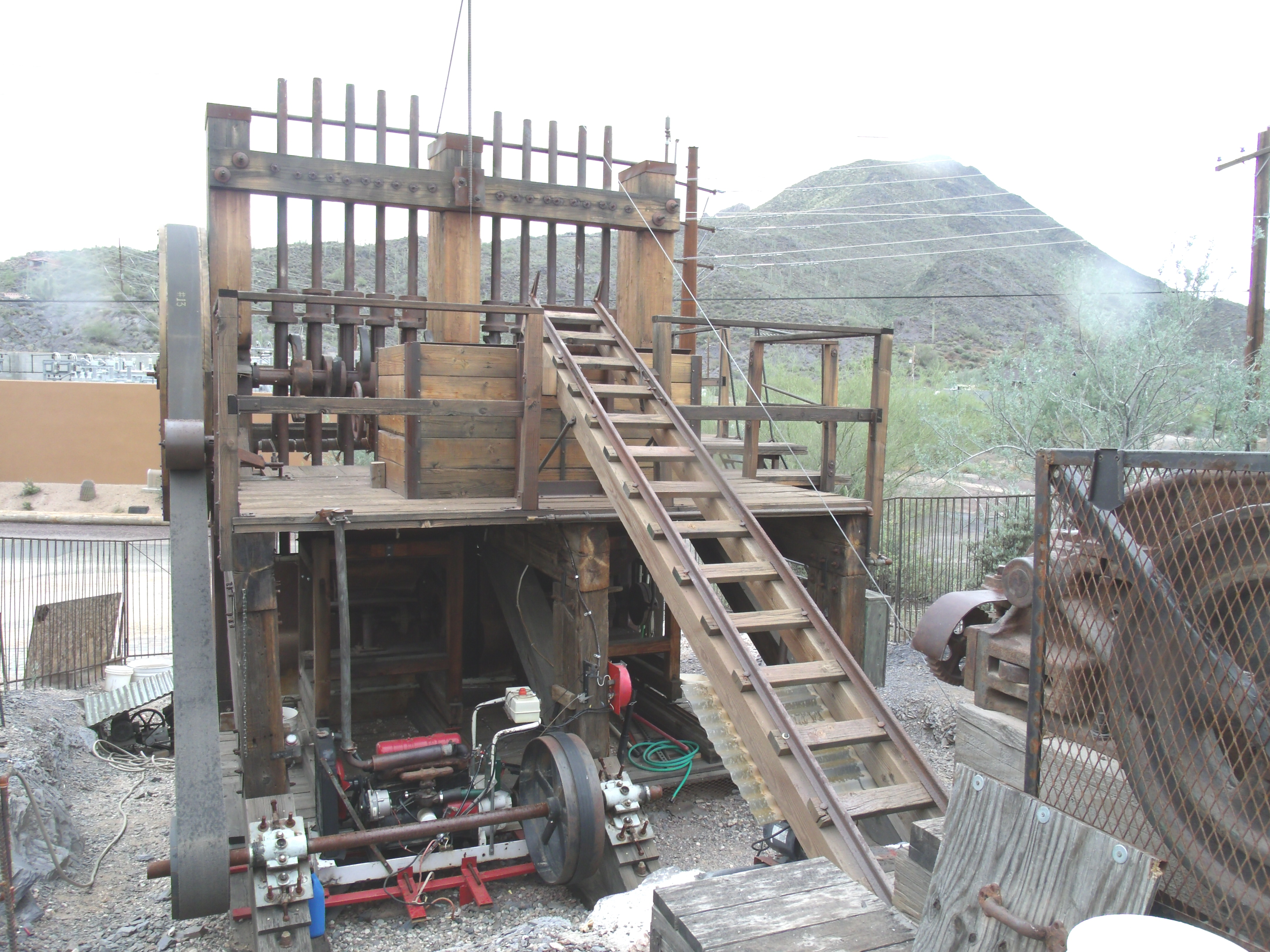
Different view of the Golden Reef Stamp Mill.

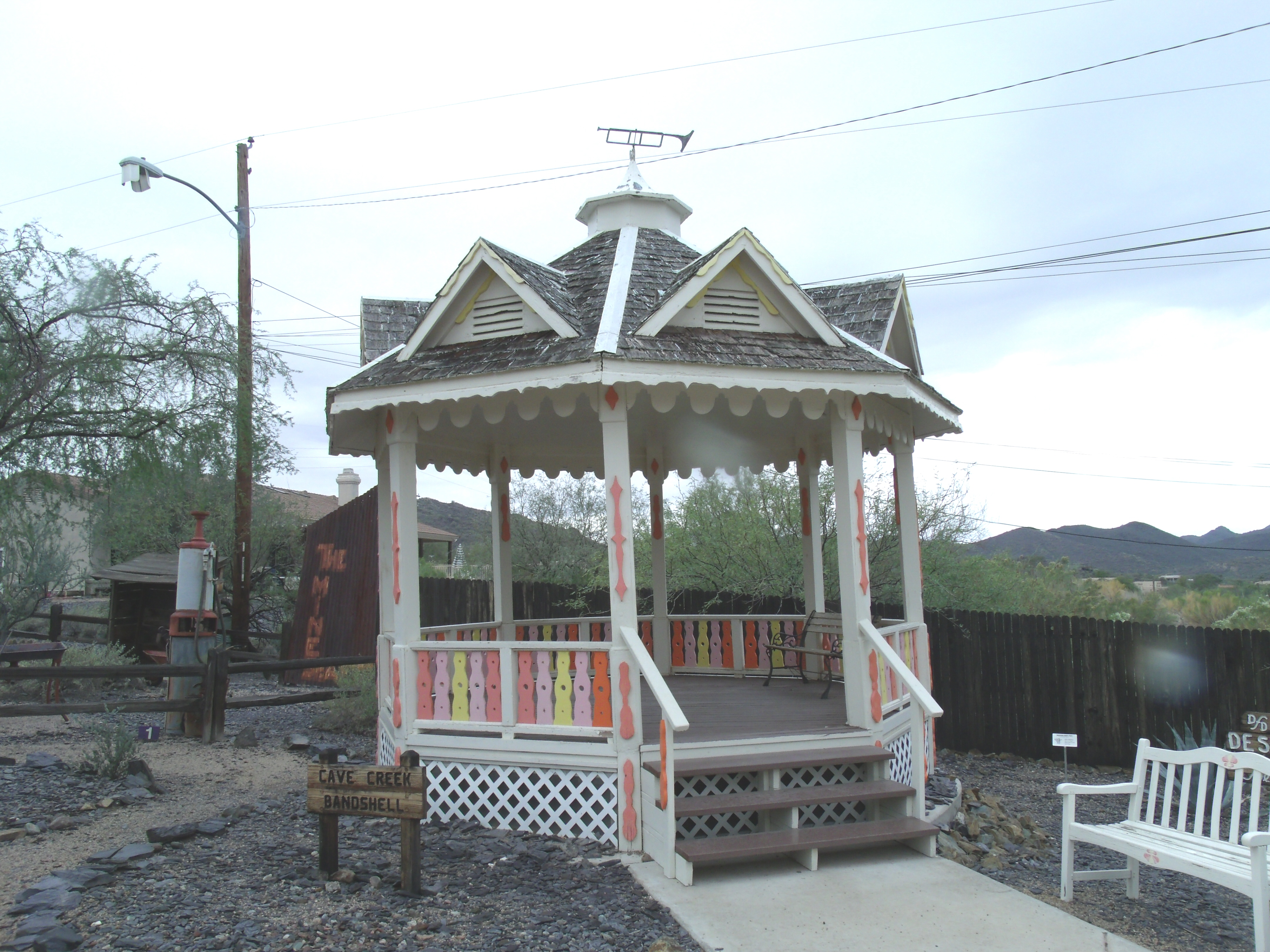
The Cave Creek Bandshell.

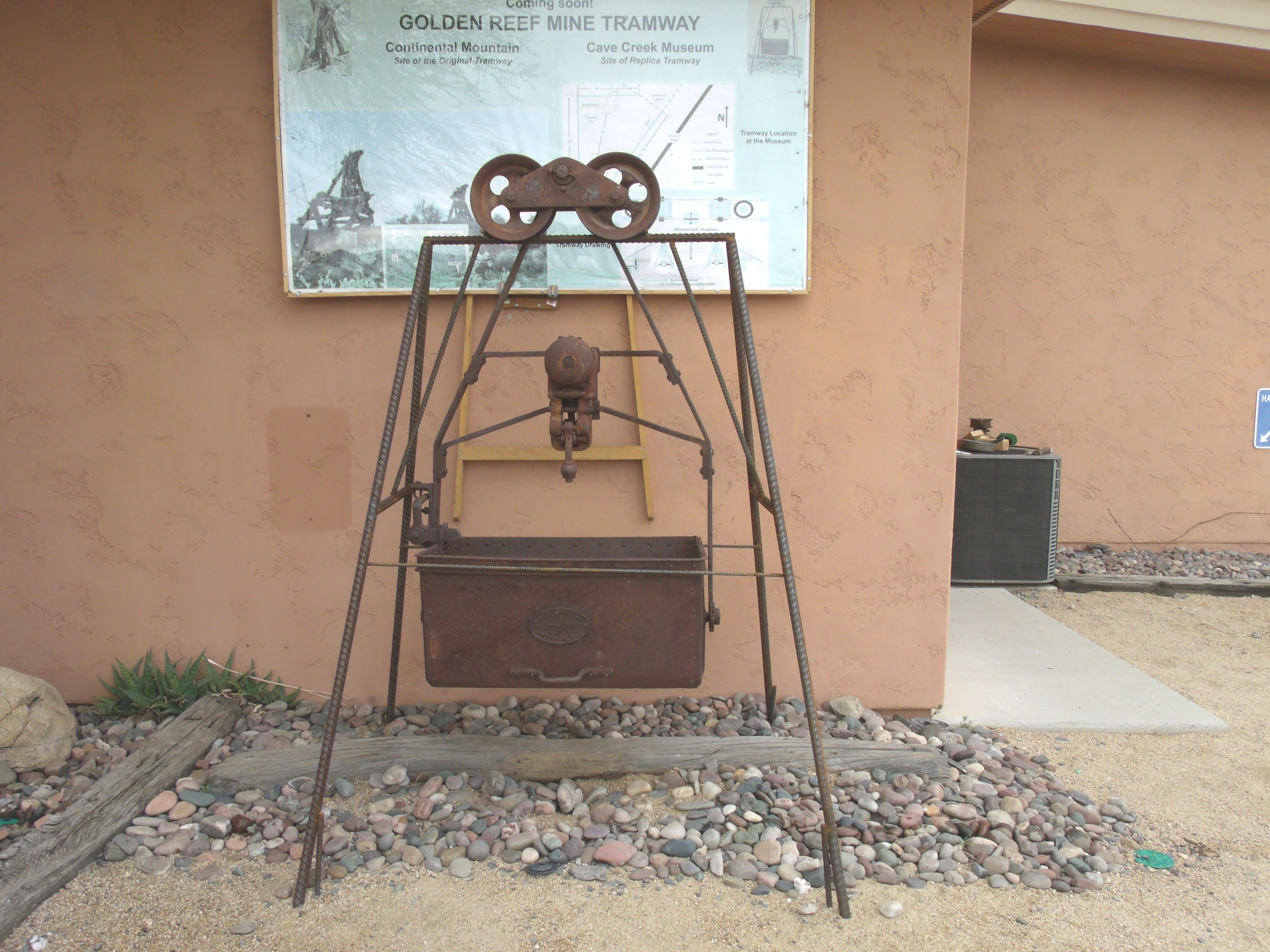
The pre-1913 Golden Reef Mine Tramway Car.

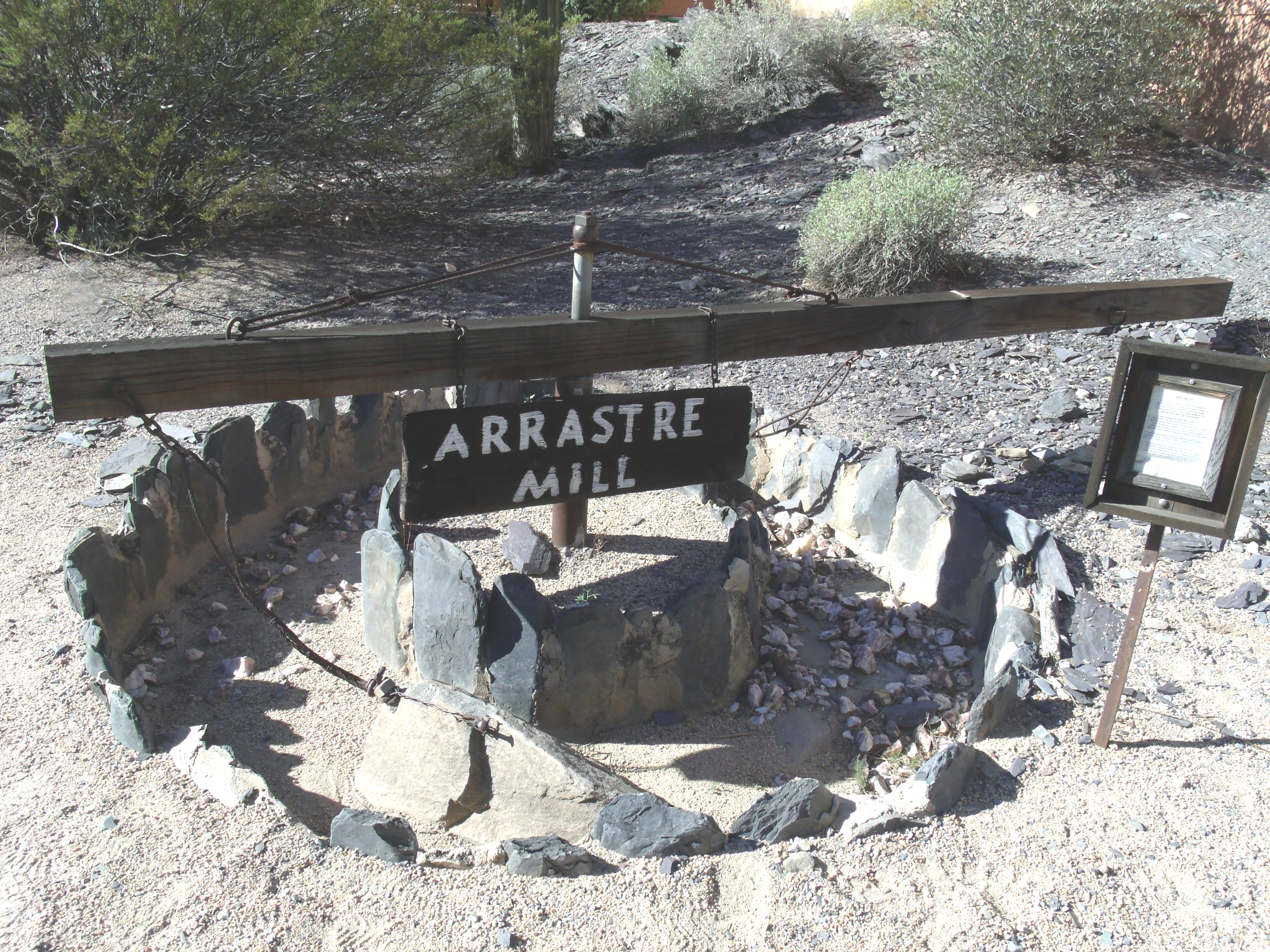
A Miner’s Arrastre.

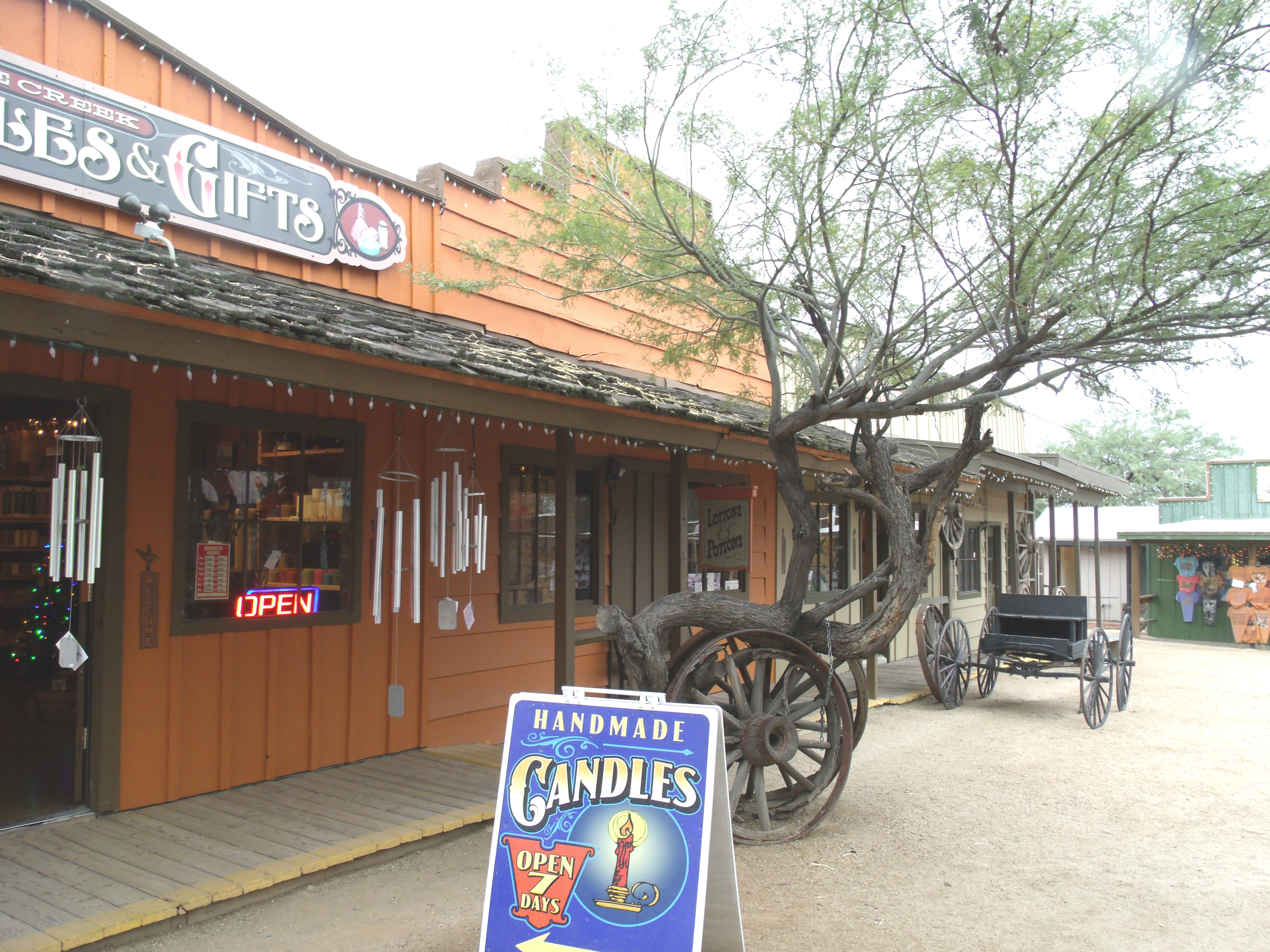
The buildings in Frontier Town are not replicas from Cave Creek’s old west days of cowboys and gold miners.

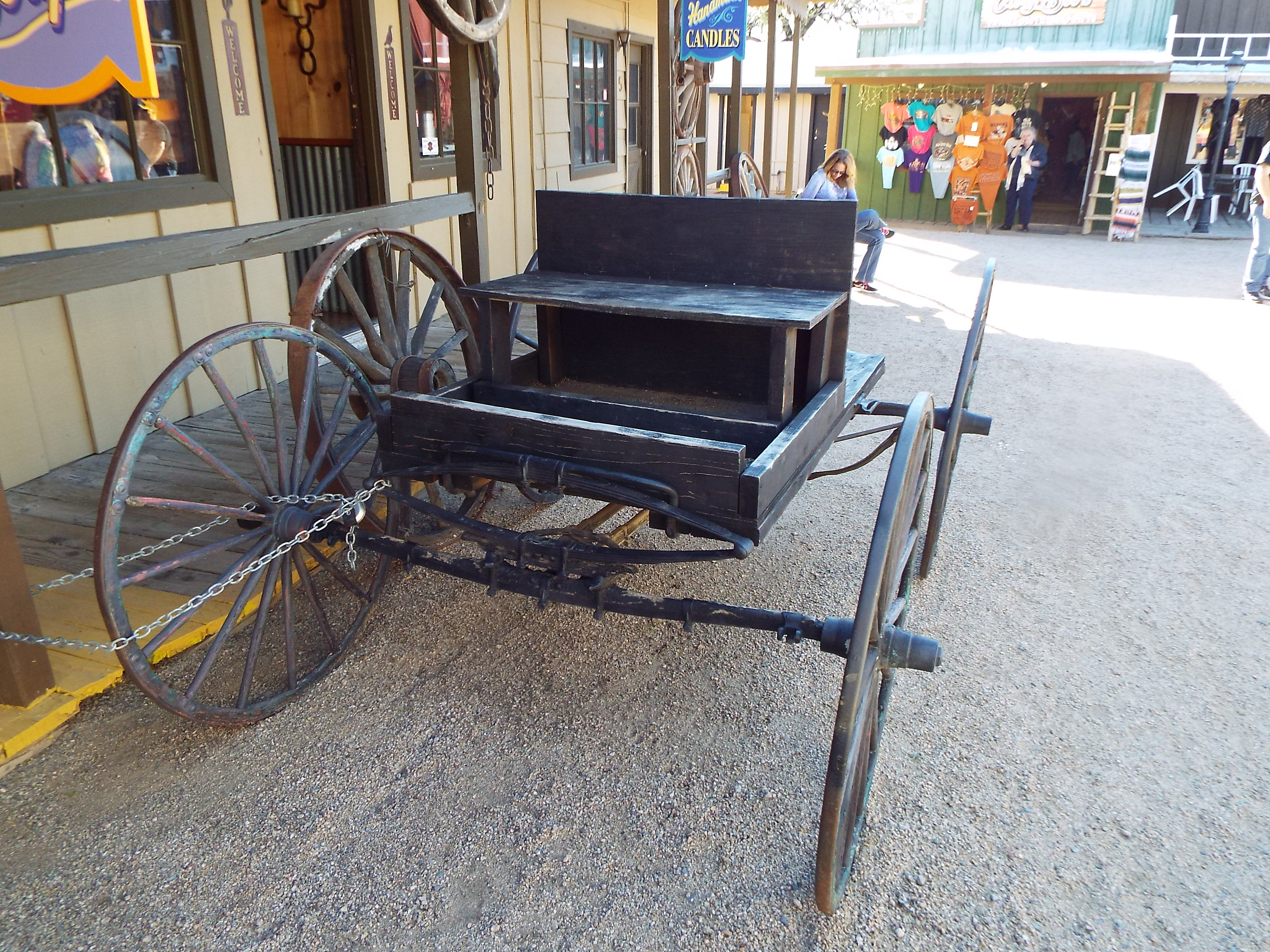
A 19th century wagon in Frontier Town.

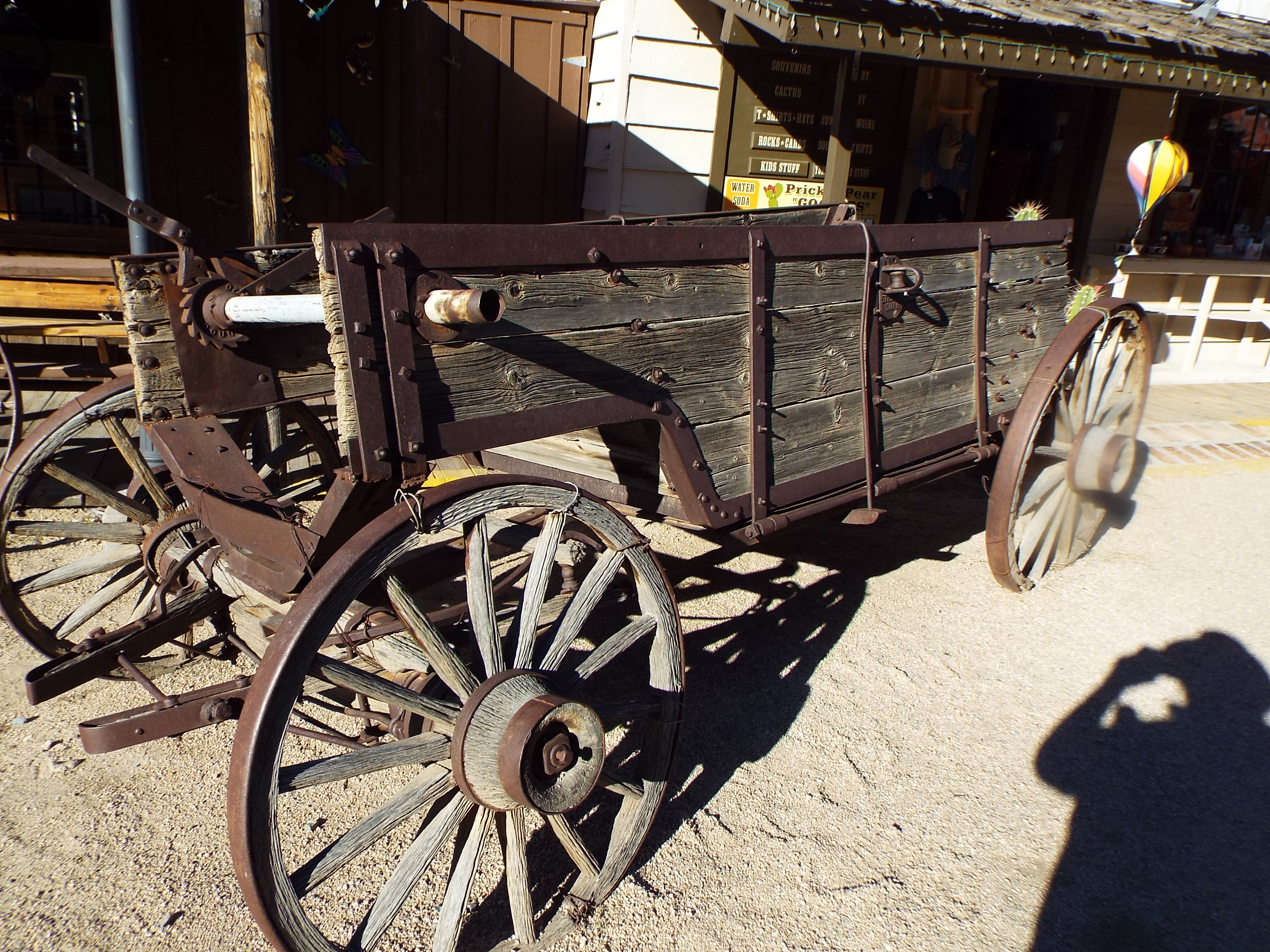
One of many 19th century wagons in Frontier Town.

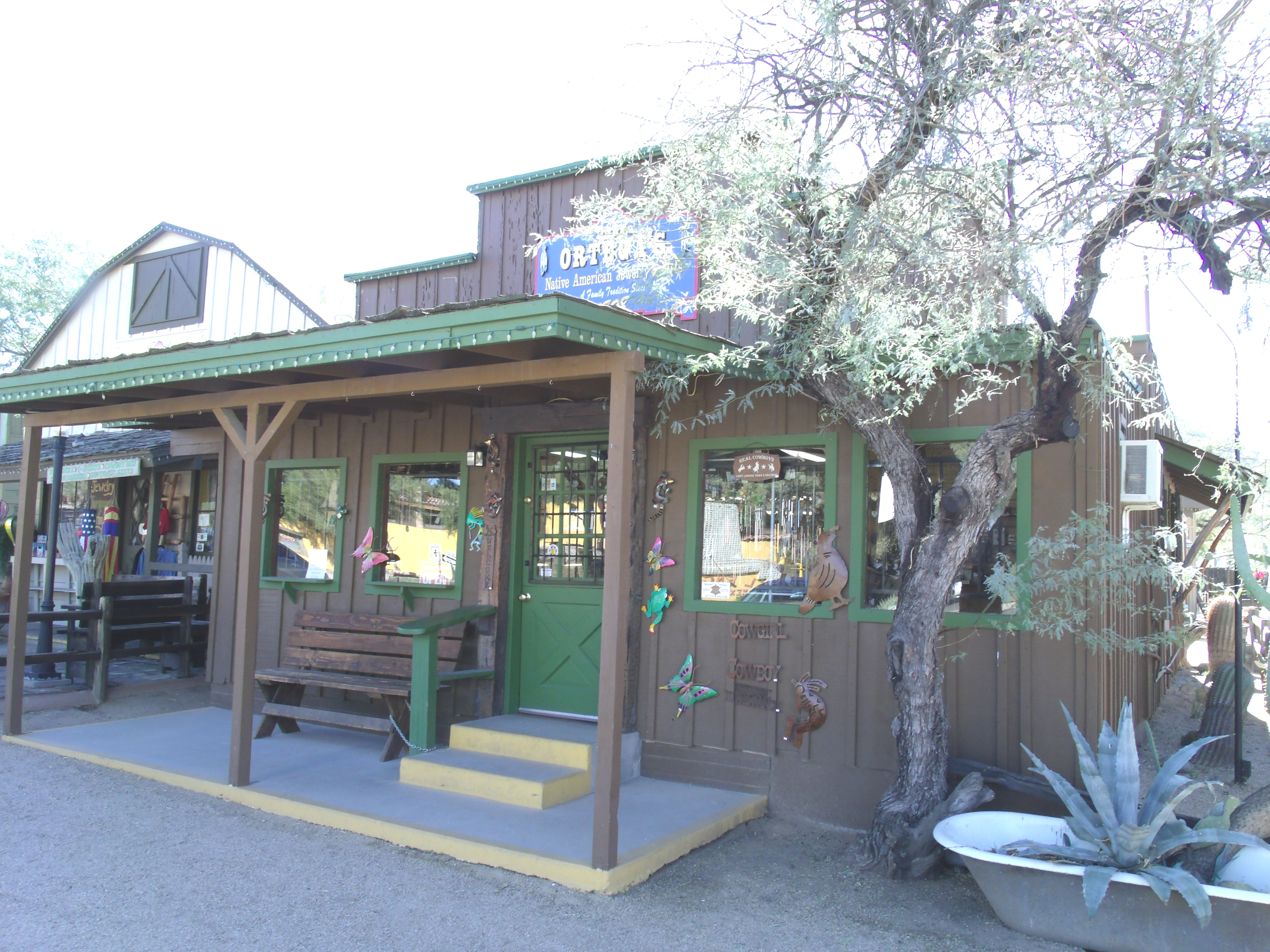
The former Leather Mill building was built in the late 1880s and is one of the original extant buildings in Cave Creek.

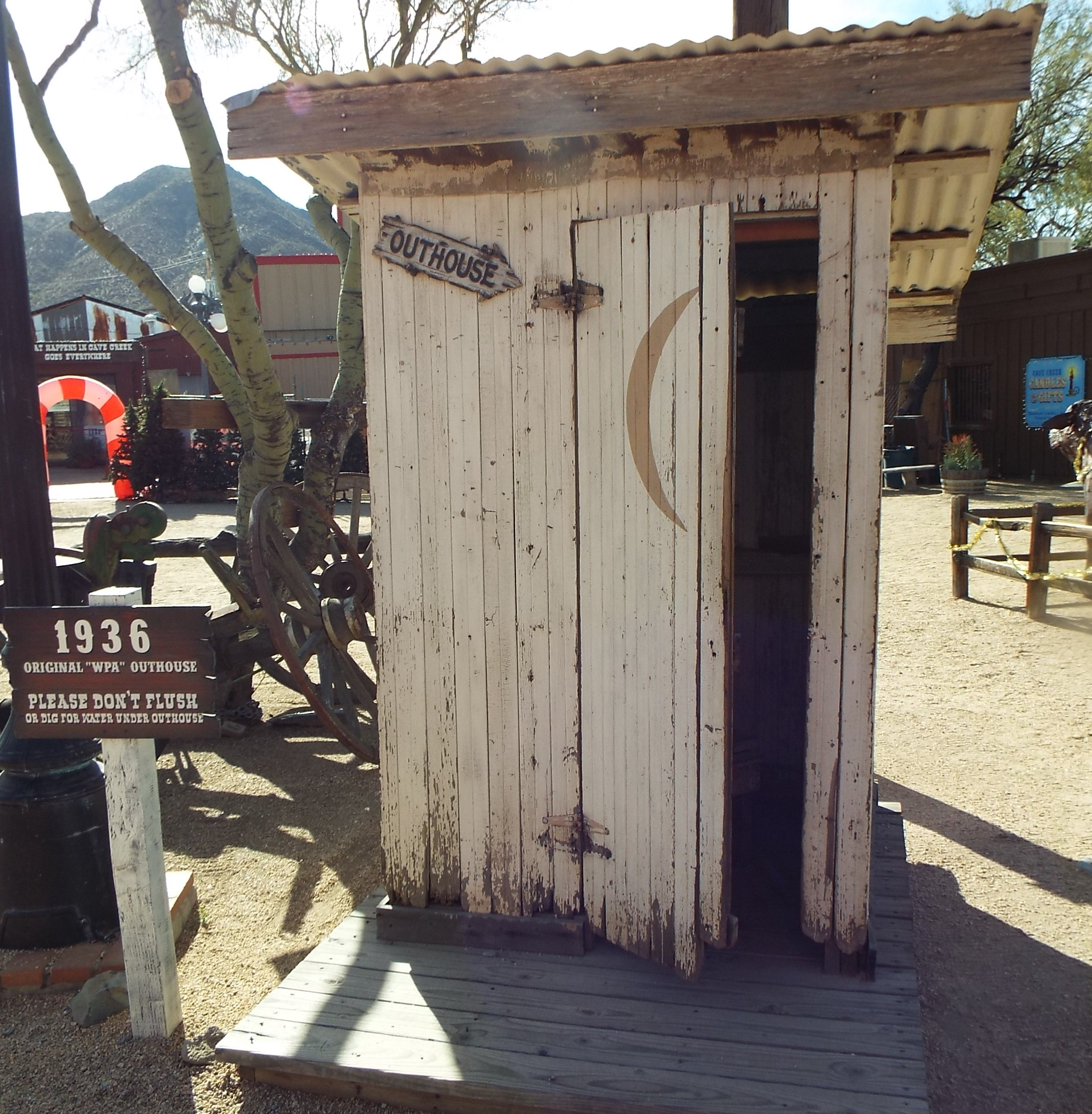
1936 “WPA” outhouse.

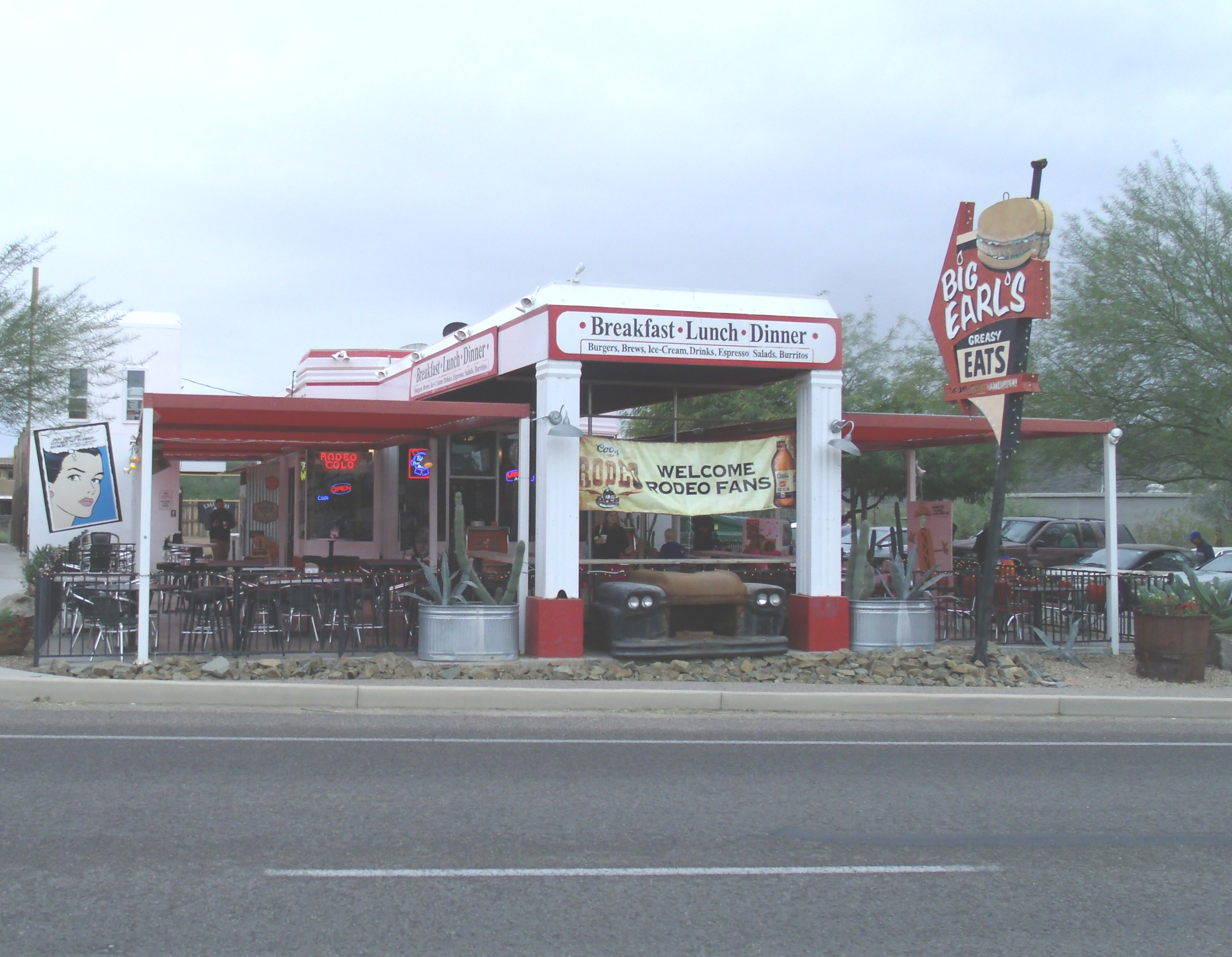
The Cave Creek Service Station.

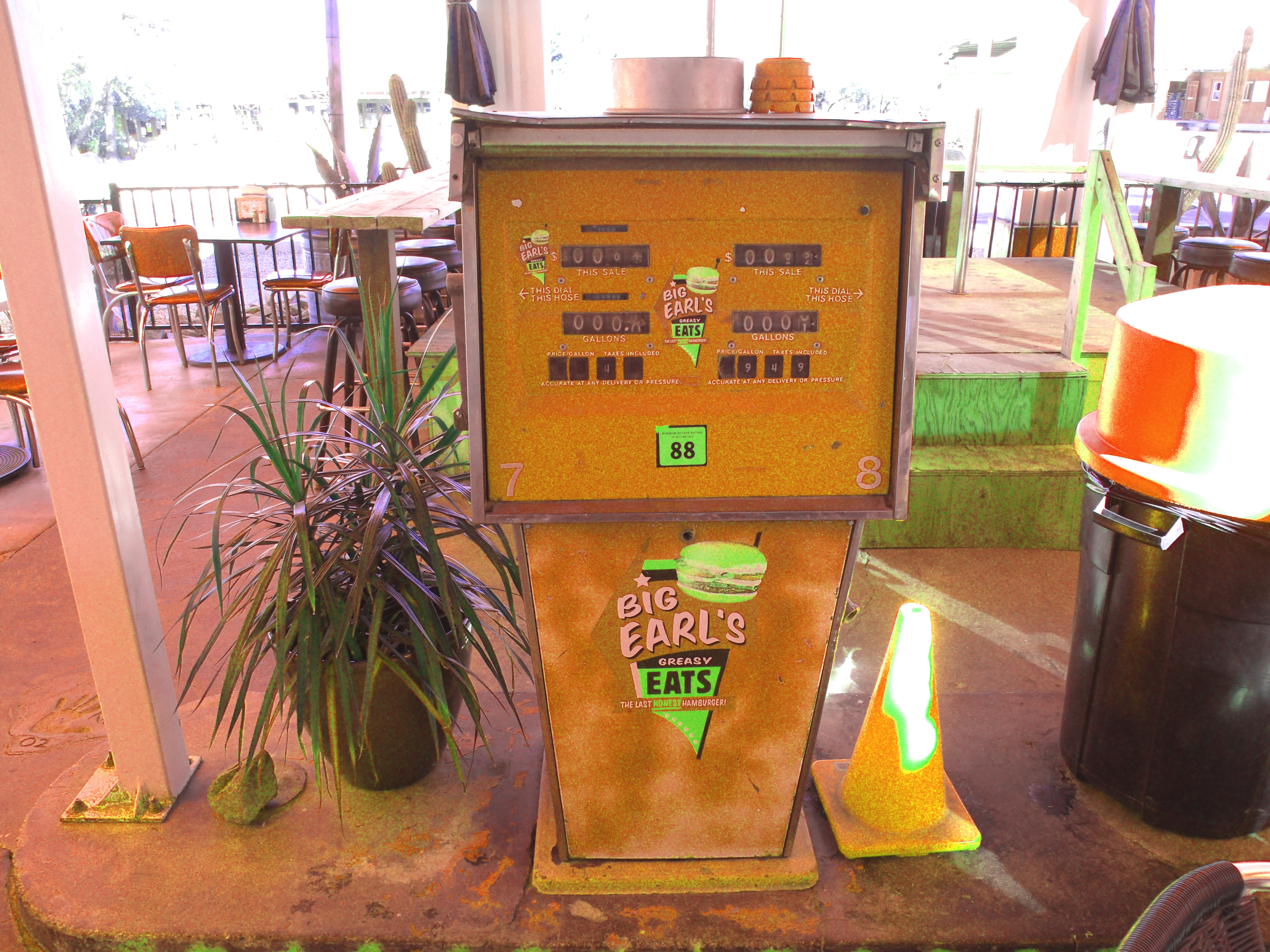
1945 Cave Creek Service Station gas pump.

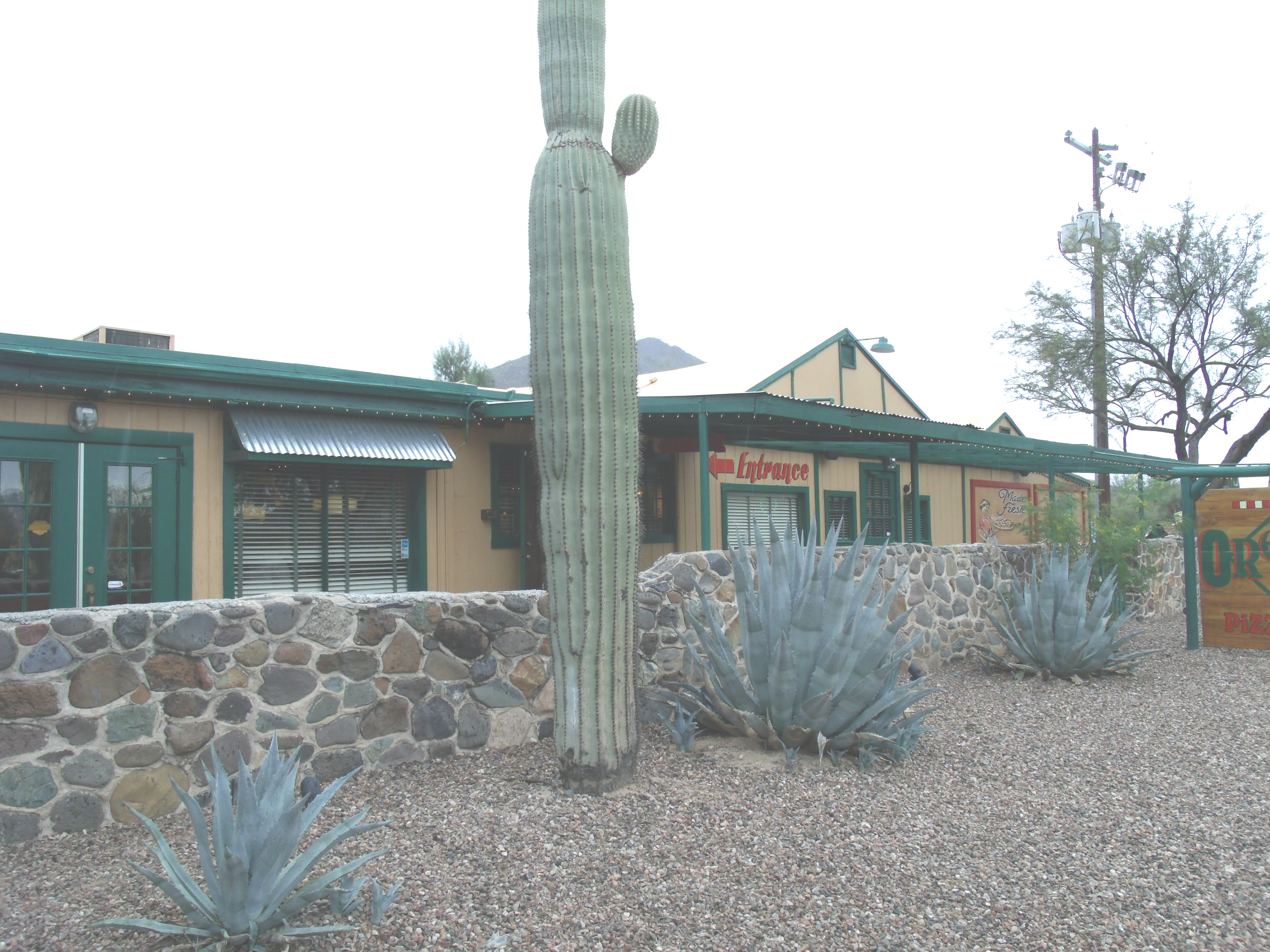
The Cave Creek Inn.

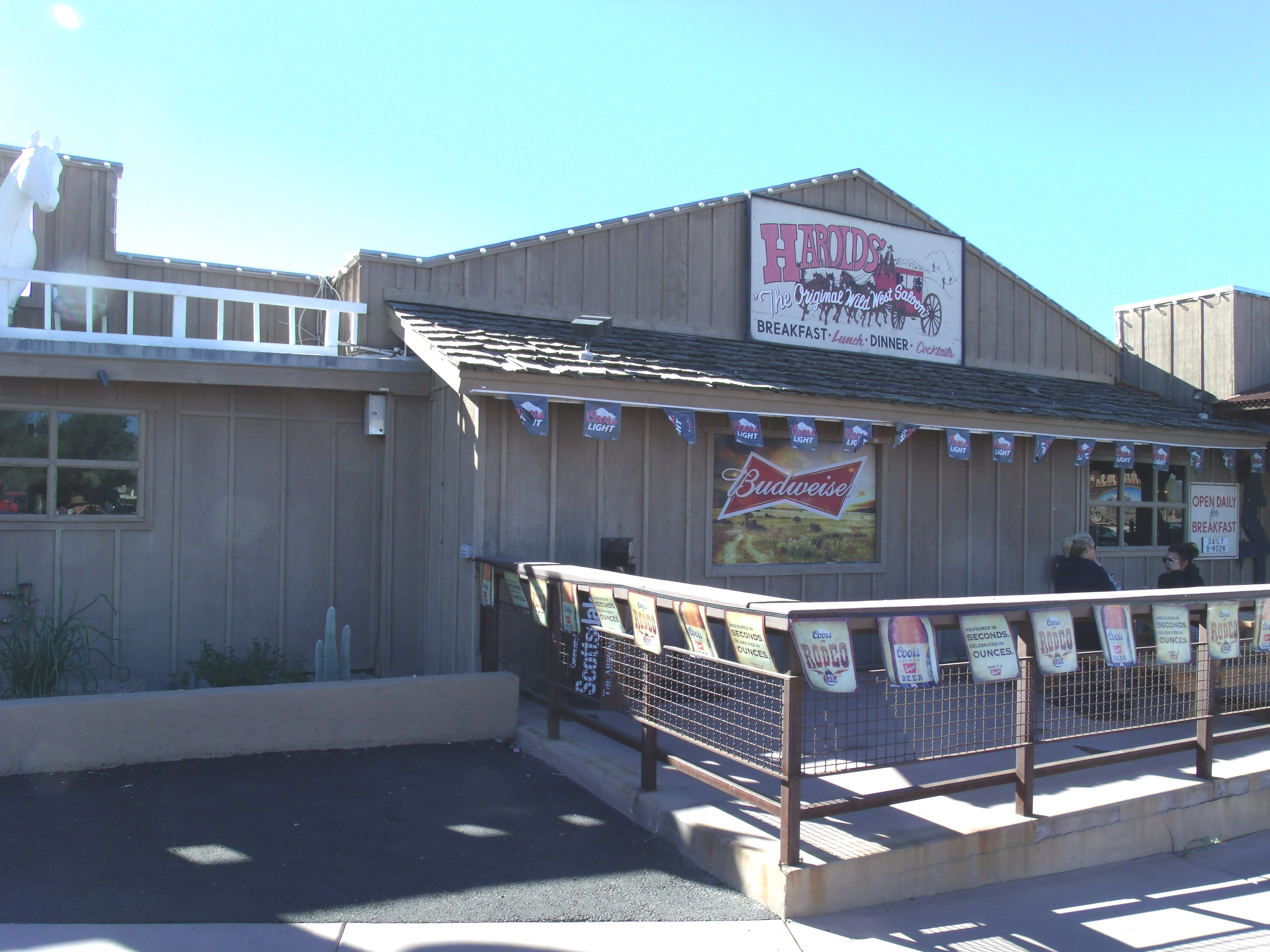
Harold’s Cave Creek Corral was built in 1935 and was originally a Corral Bar.

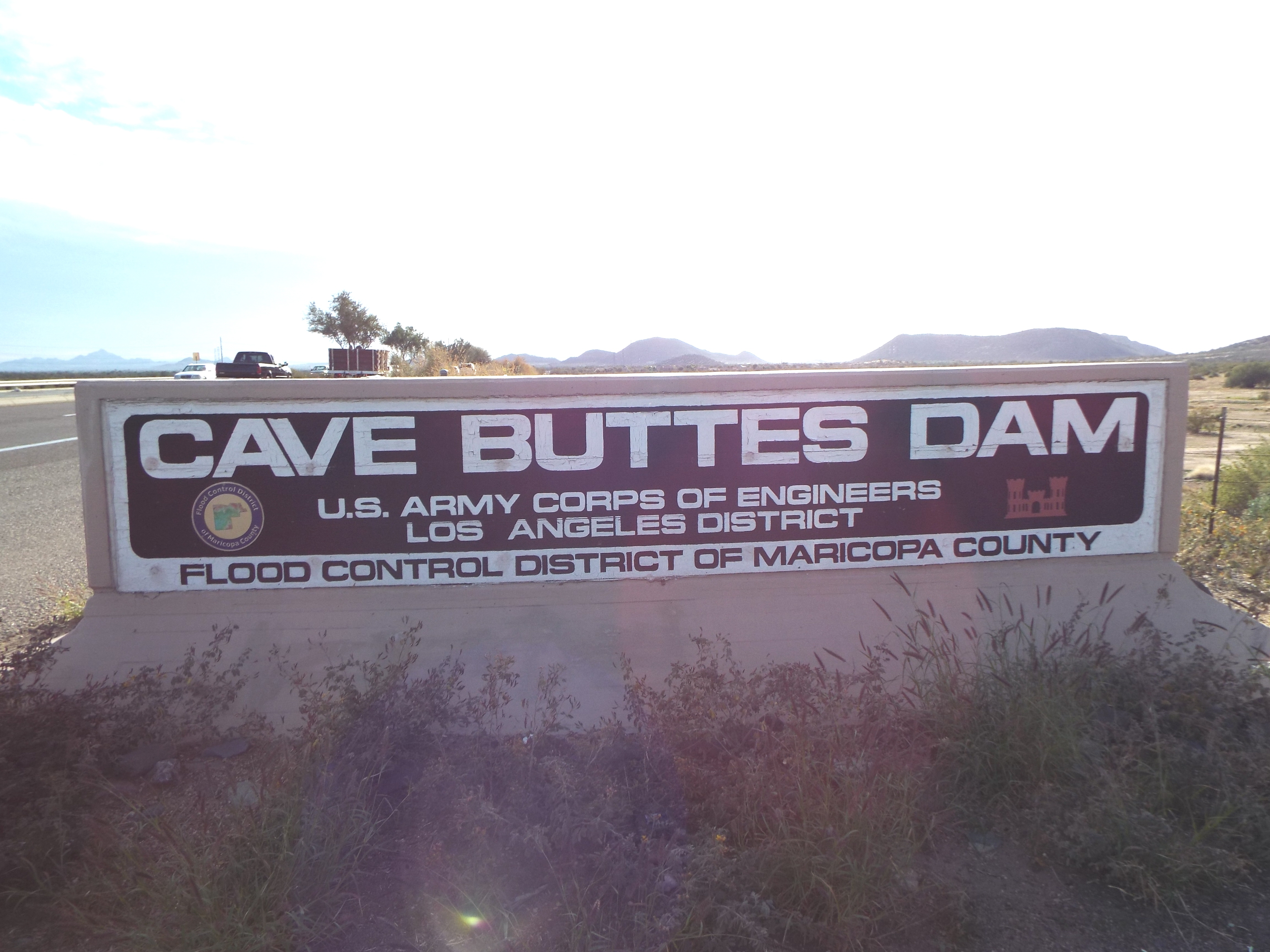
The Cave Buttes Dam marker.

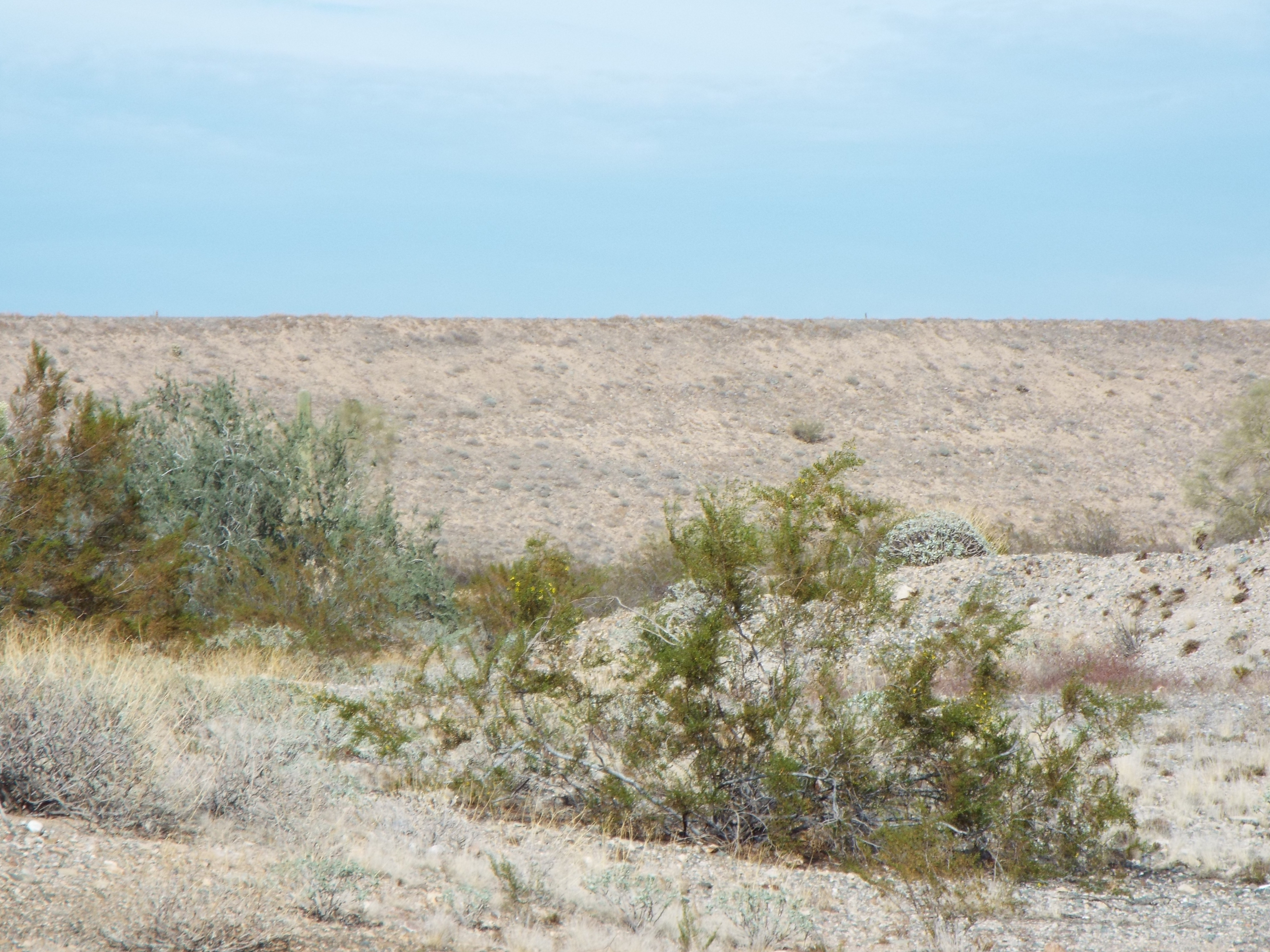
The Cave Buttes Dam is an earthen dam built in 1979, by the U.S. Army Corps of Engineers. The dry dam was built to replace the nearby Cave Creek Dam.

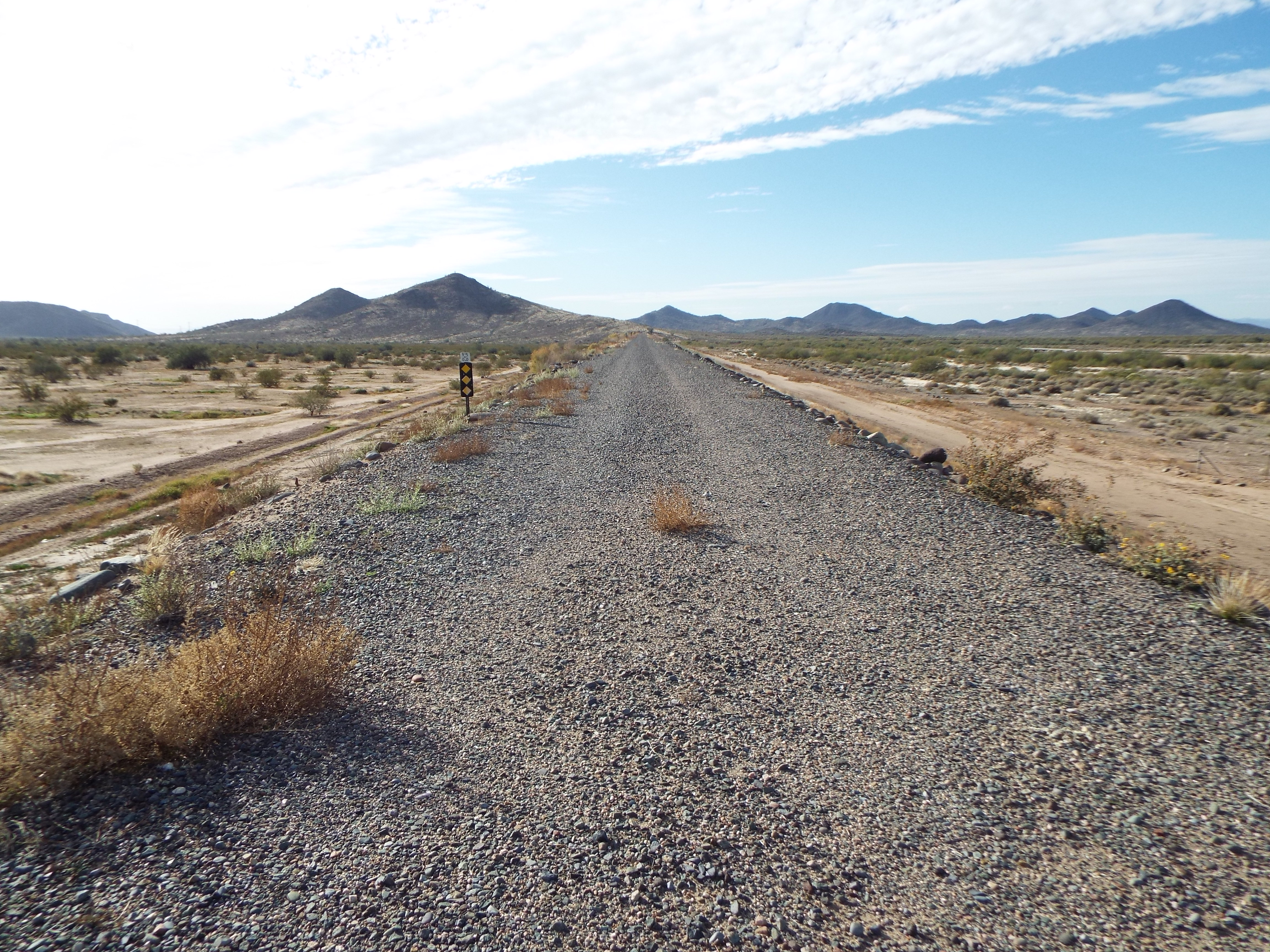
Road leading to the Cave Buttes Dam.

== Historic Stoneman Military Road ==
The following are the images of the Historic Stoneman Military Road in Cave Creek.

The historic Stoneman Military Road

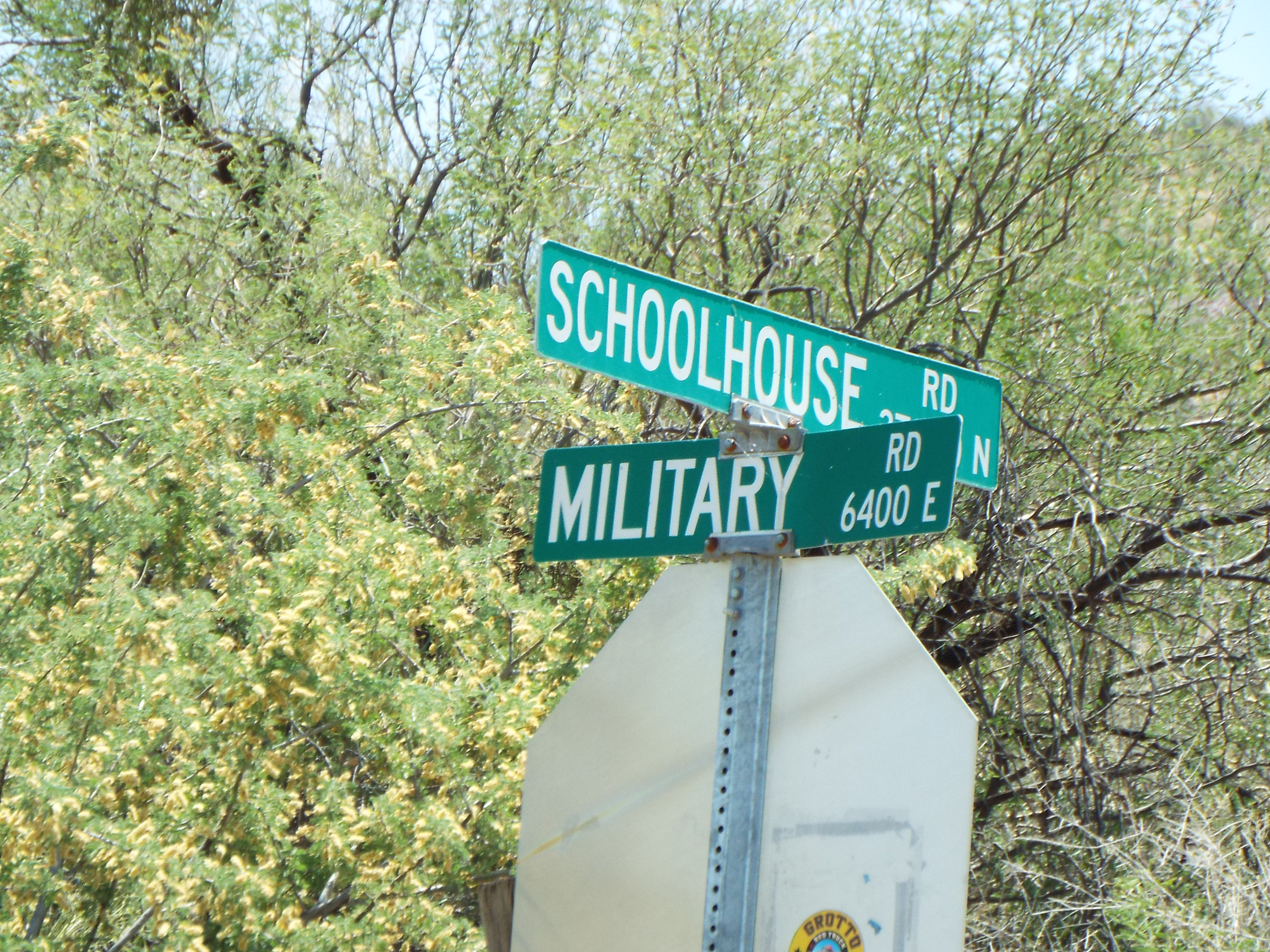
Road sign indicating where the Stoneman Military Trail cut through

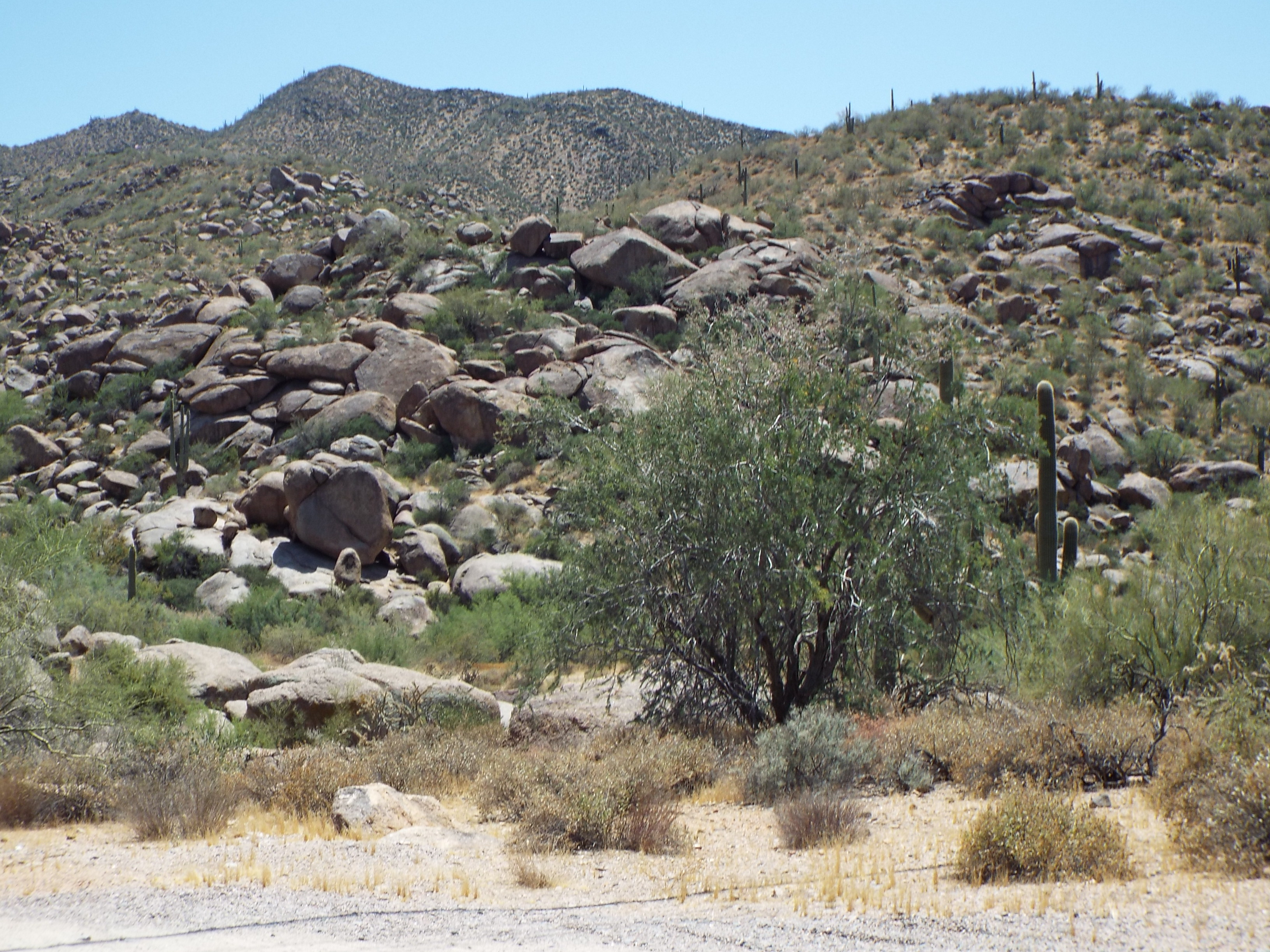
Cave Creek's Black Mountain.

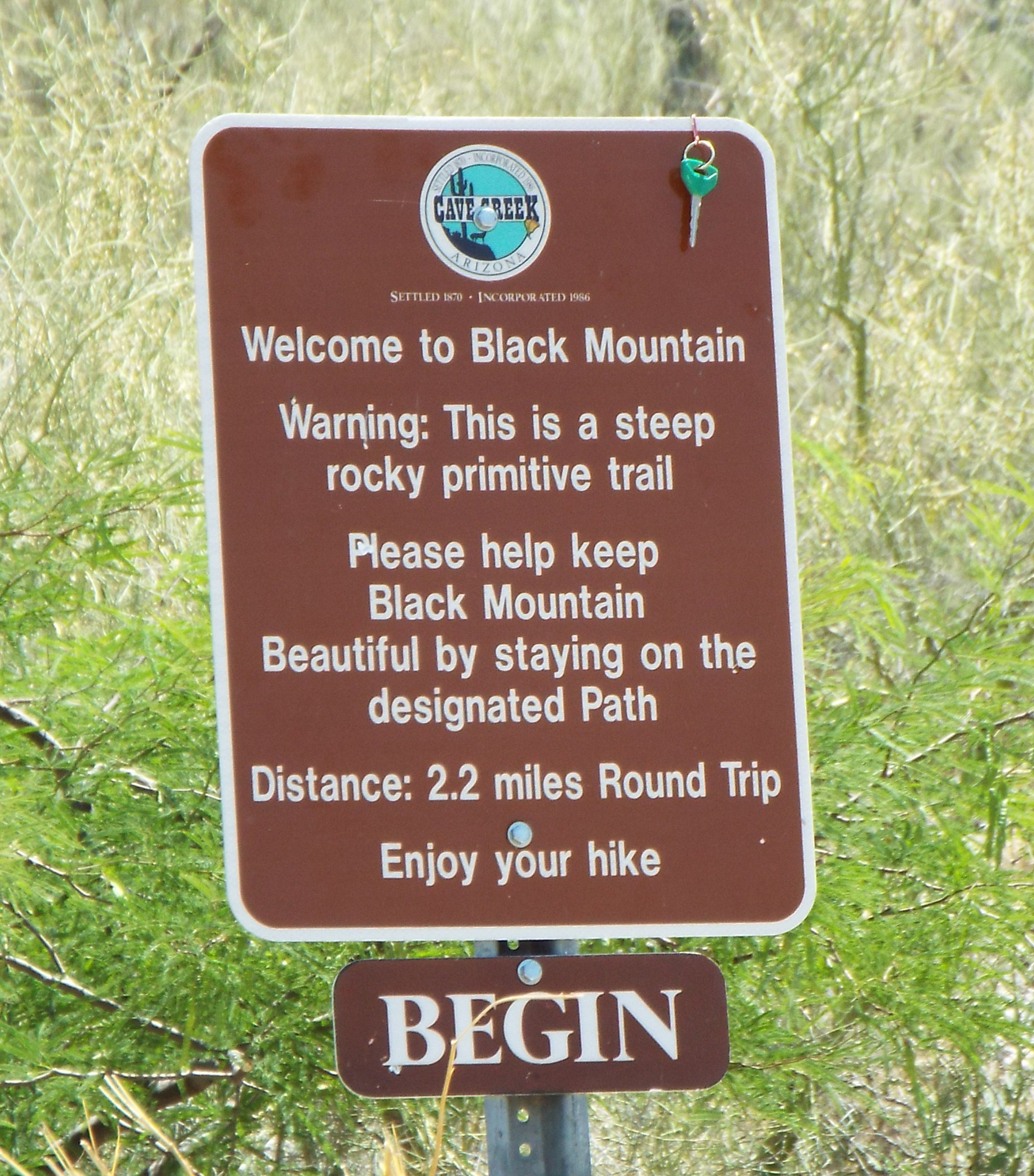
Black Mountain sign.

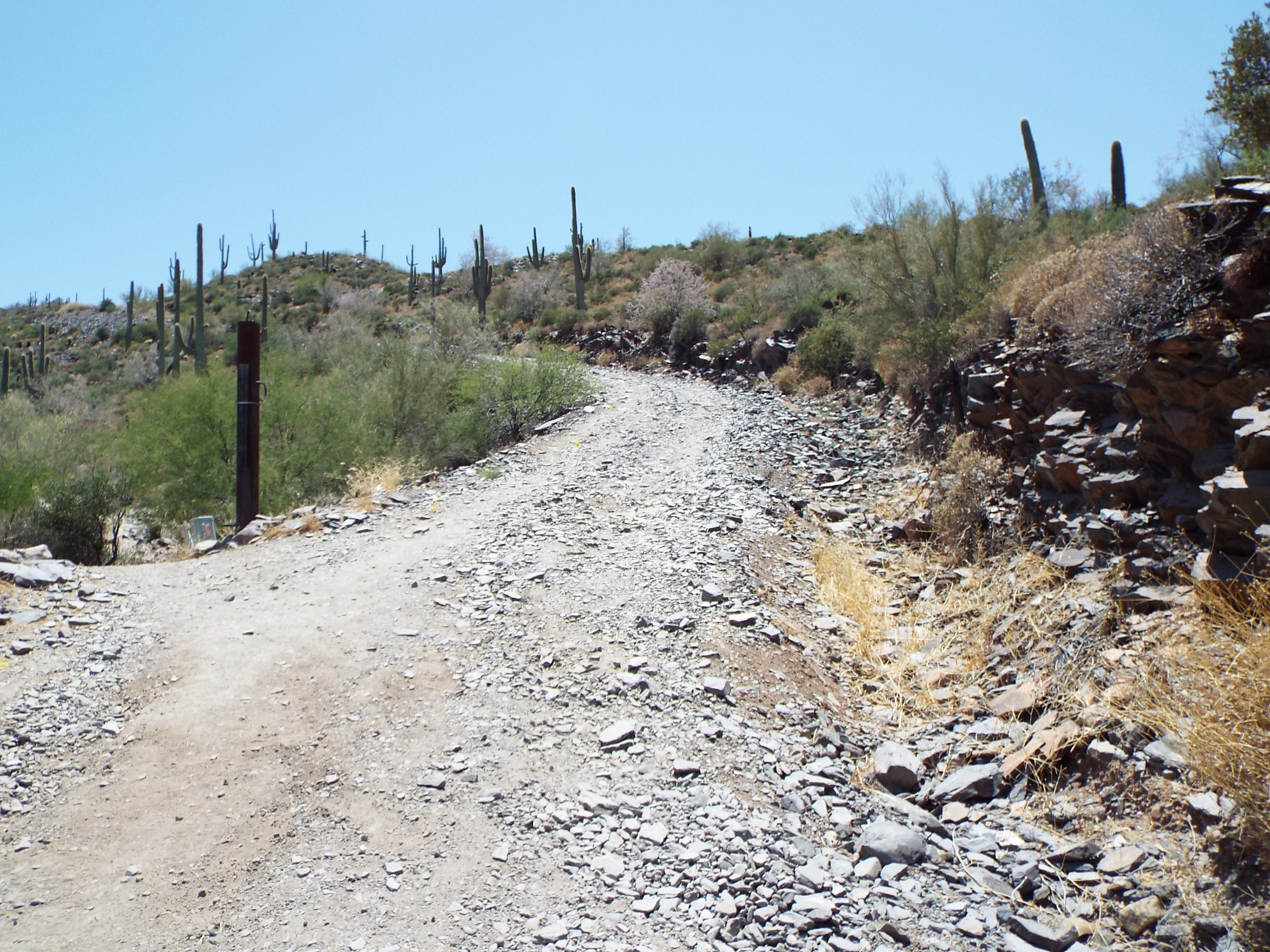
Stoneman Military Trail.

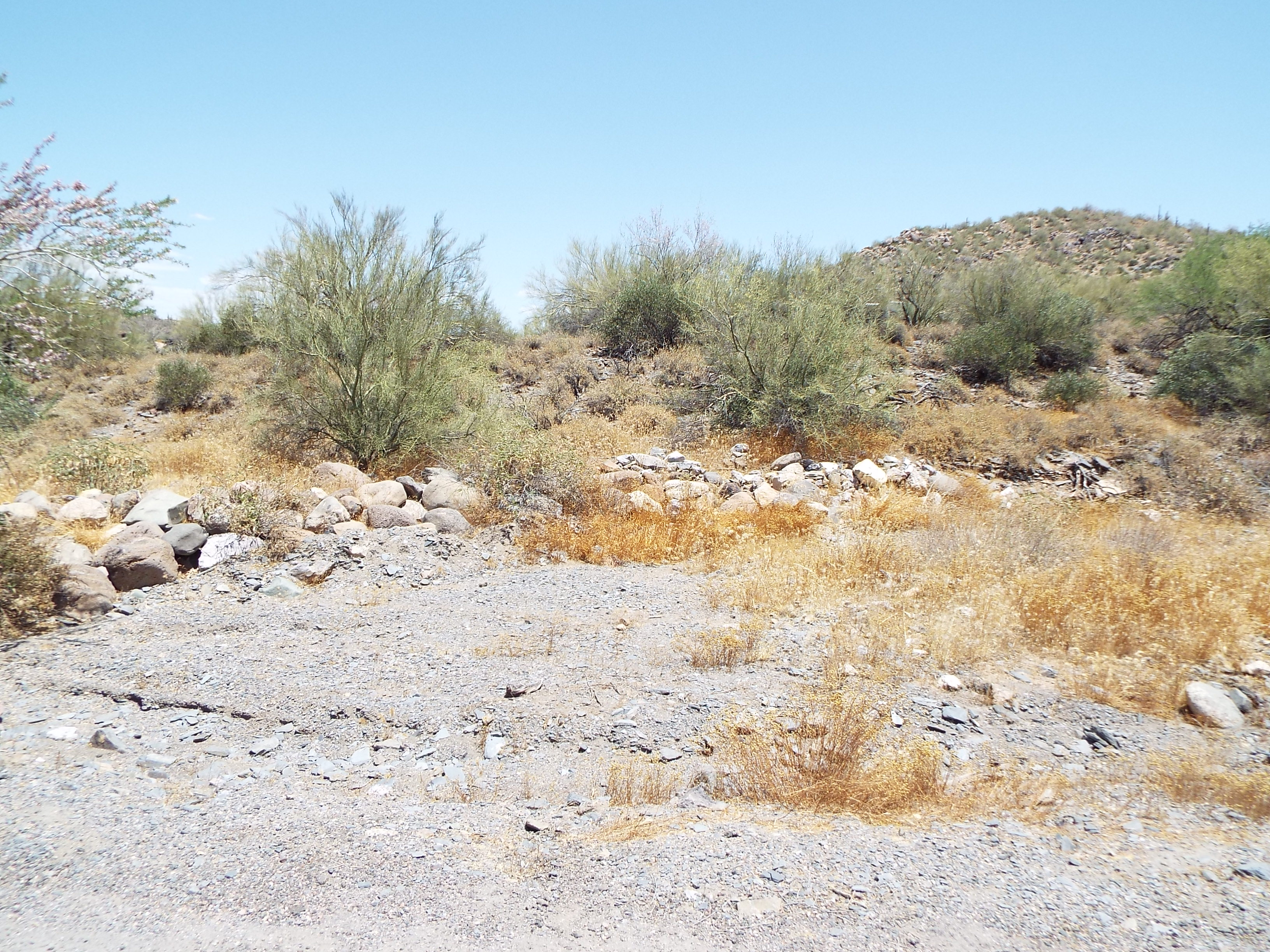
Ruins along the Stoneman Military Trail.

== See also ==
- National Register of Historic Places listings in Maricopa County, Arizona
