= Cave Creek Museum =

History and culture museum in Arizona, US

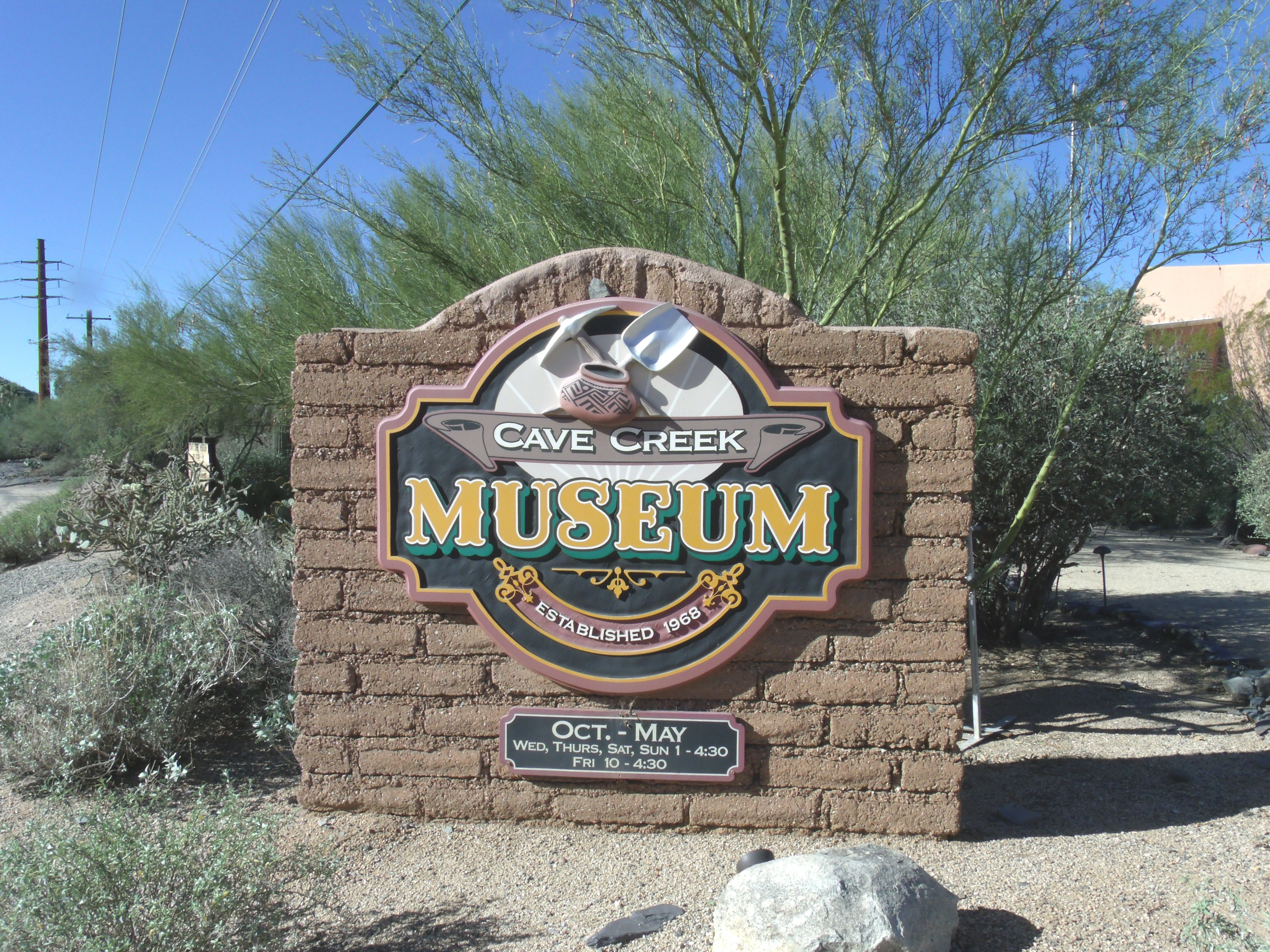
- Cave Creek Museum entrance.
- Established: 1968
- Location: 6140 East Skyline Drive; Cave Creek, Arizona
- Coordinates: 33°49′44″N 111°56′54″W
- Type: History and culture museum
- Key holdings: The first church of Cave Creek and the last tubercular cabin in the state
- Collections: Central Ansbaugh Auditorium, the Archaeology Wing, the Pioneer Wing and the “Mini-wing.
- Founder: Volunteers of the local historical society

The Cave Creek Museum is a 501(c)(3) non-profit entity at the base of the Black Mountains in the town of Cave Creek in Maricopa County, Arizona, United States. The museum preserves artifacts of the prehistory and objects related to the culture of the Cave Creek/Carefree foothills area. The museum consists of various exhibits, indoor and outdoor. Among the outdoor exhibits are the first church of Cave Creek and the last tubercular cabin in the state of Arizona.

== History ==
In 1968, a group of local volunteers, who formed a historical society, founded the Cave Creek Museum on land donated by Frank and Hazel Wright. Their mission was and is to preserve artifacts related to the prehistory, history and culture of the Cave Creek/Carefree foothills. The main plan was to accomplish the set mission through education, research and interpretive exhibits and programs.

In April 1970 the museum officially opened its doors. Inside the museum there are four areas of historical exhibition. The names of the four areas are the Central Ansbaugh Auditorium which has a display of textiles, oil paintings, jewelry and sculptures, the Archaeology Wing, the History Wing which features artifacts from Cave Creek's mining, military, settler and ranching days and the "Mini-wing".

Outside on the museum grounds is the first church of Cave Creek which was relocated there. There is also the last tubercular cabin in the state Of Arizona. The cabin is listed in the National Register of Historic Places.

Gold prospectors began to venture into Arizona upon the discovery of gold and set up mining camps all the way to Cave Creek. One of the exhibits is the Golden Reef Stamp Mill. Other exhibits include tools and machines used by the early ranchers in the area.

== Historic structures and artifacts ==
The following are the images of the Cave Creek Museum:

- The Tubercular Cabin on the outside and inside. The cabin was built in 1920 and listed in the National Register of Historic Places on October 28, 2001, reference: #01001172.
- The First Church of Cave Creek also known as the First Episcopal Church of Cave Creek, was built in 1948.
- The original bell of the First Church of Cave Creek.
- The 1900 Cave Creek Bandshell (gazebo)
- The Golden Reef Stamp Mill built in 1880.
- The pre-1913 Golden Reef Mine Aerial Cableway
- A Miner's Arrastra
- The Cave Creek Museum lizard bench
The Cave Creek Museum

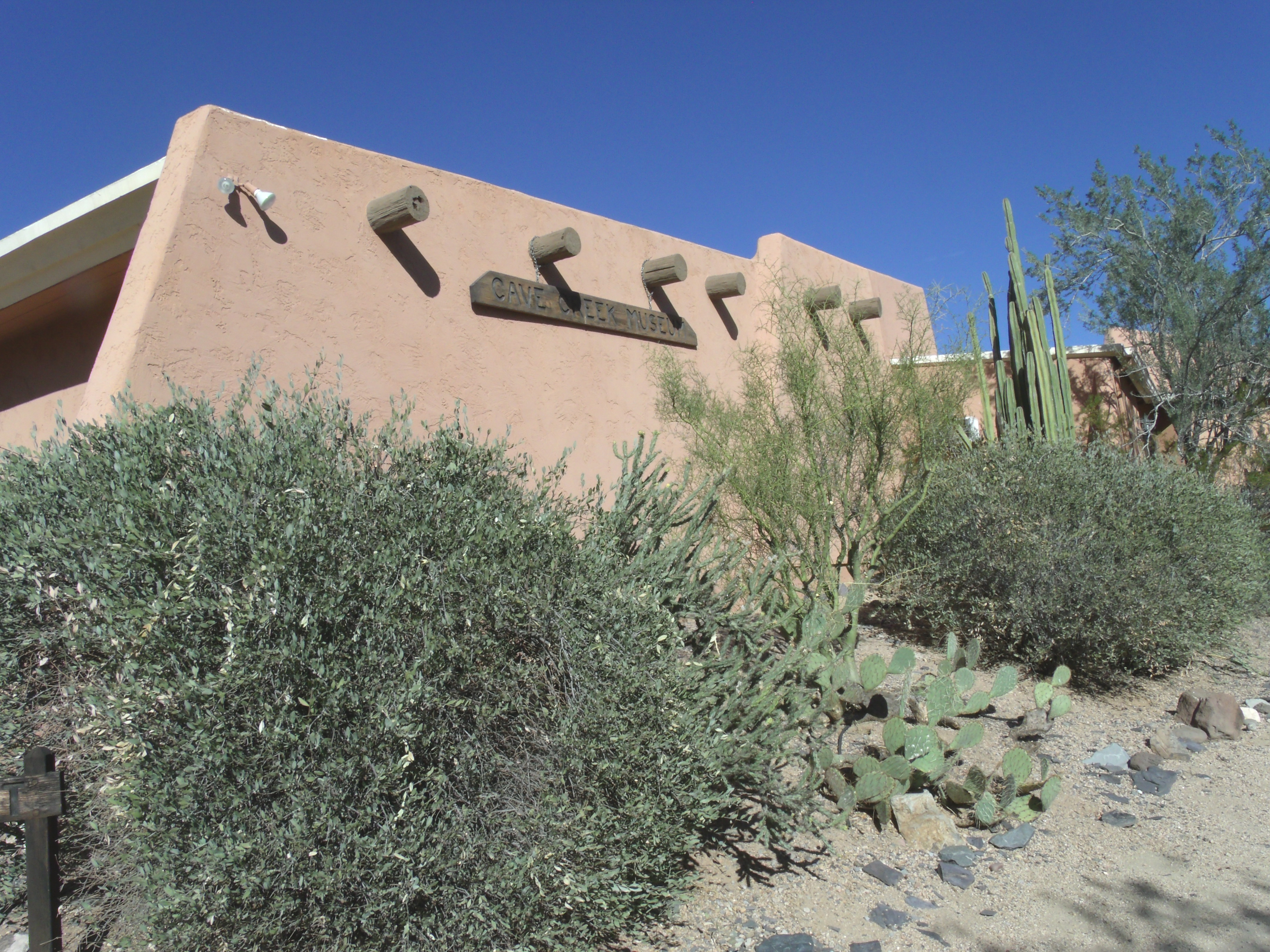
The Cave Creek Museum

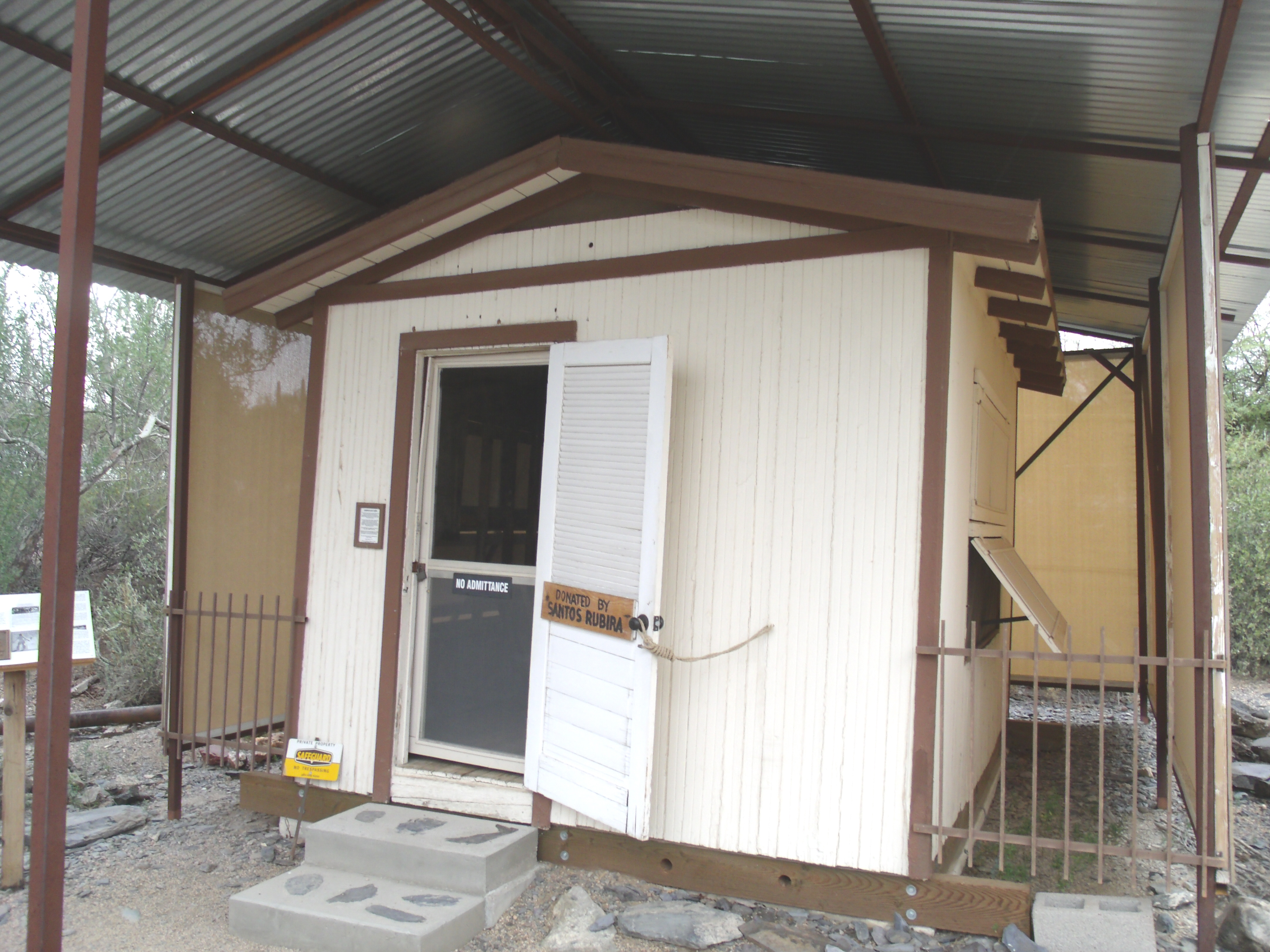
The Tubercular Cabin.

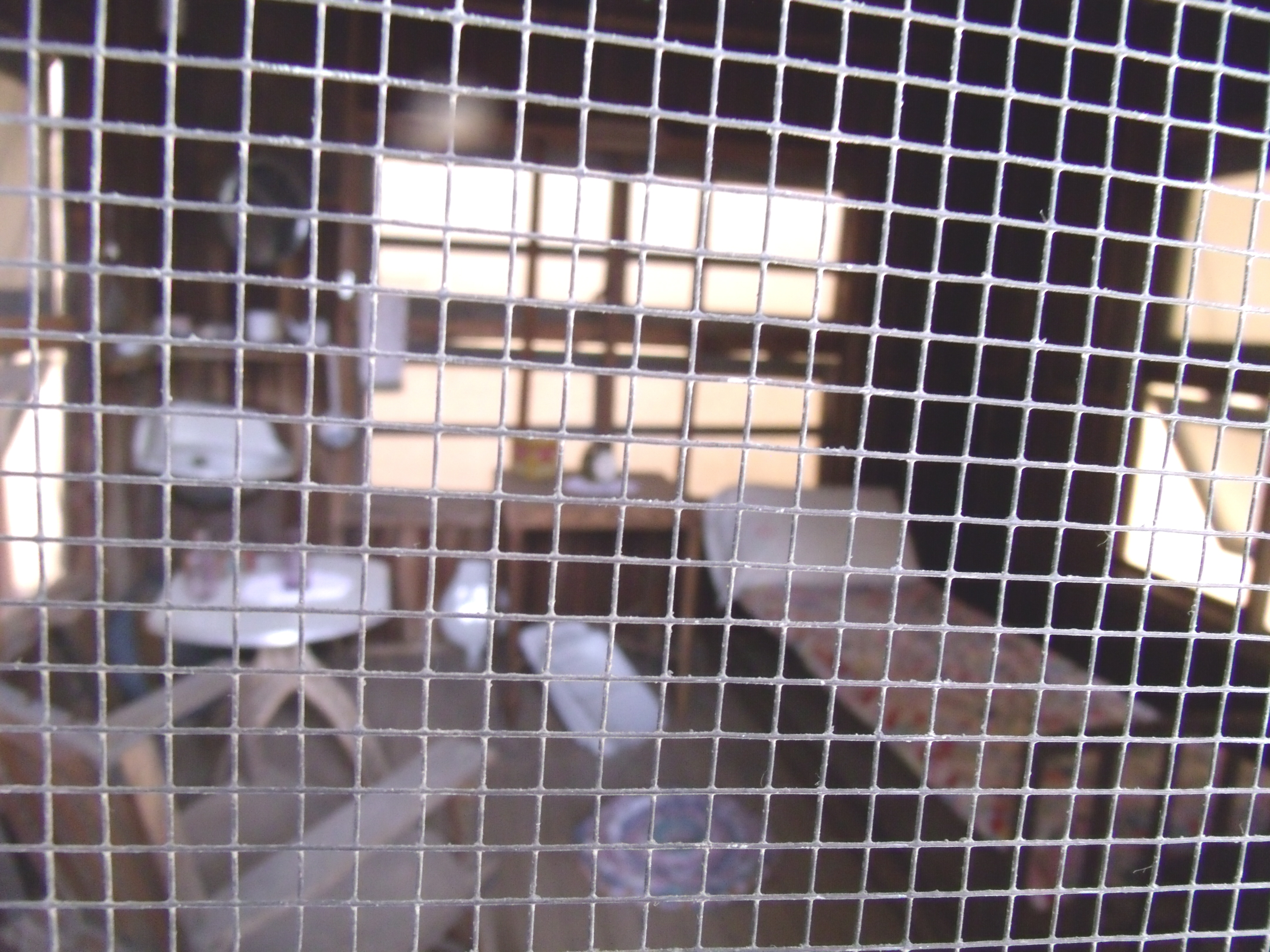
Inside the Tubercular Cabin.

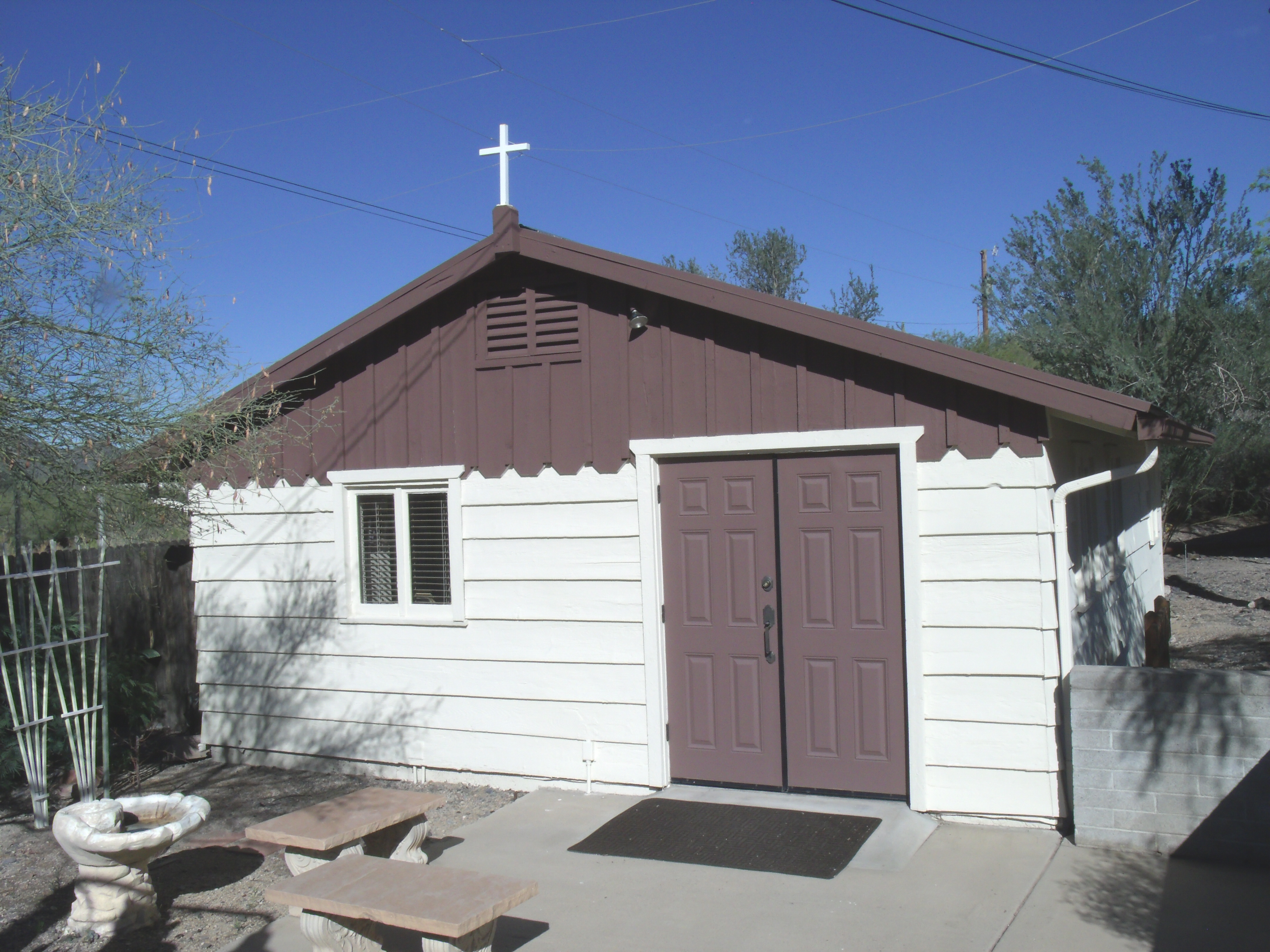
The First Church of Cave Creek

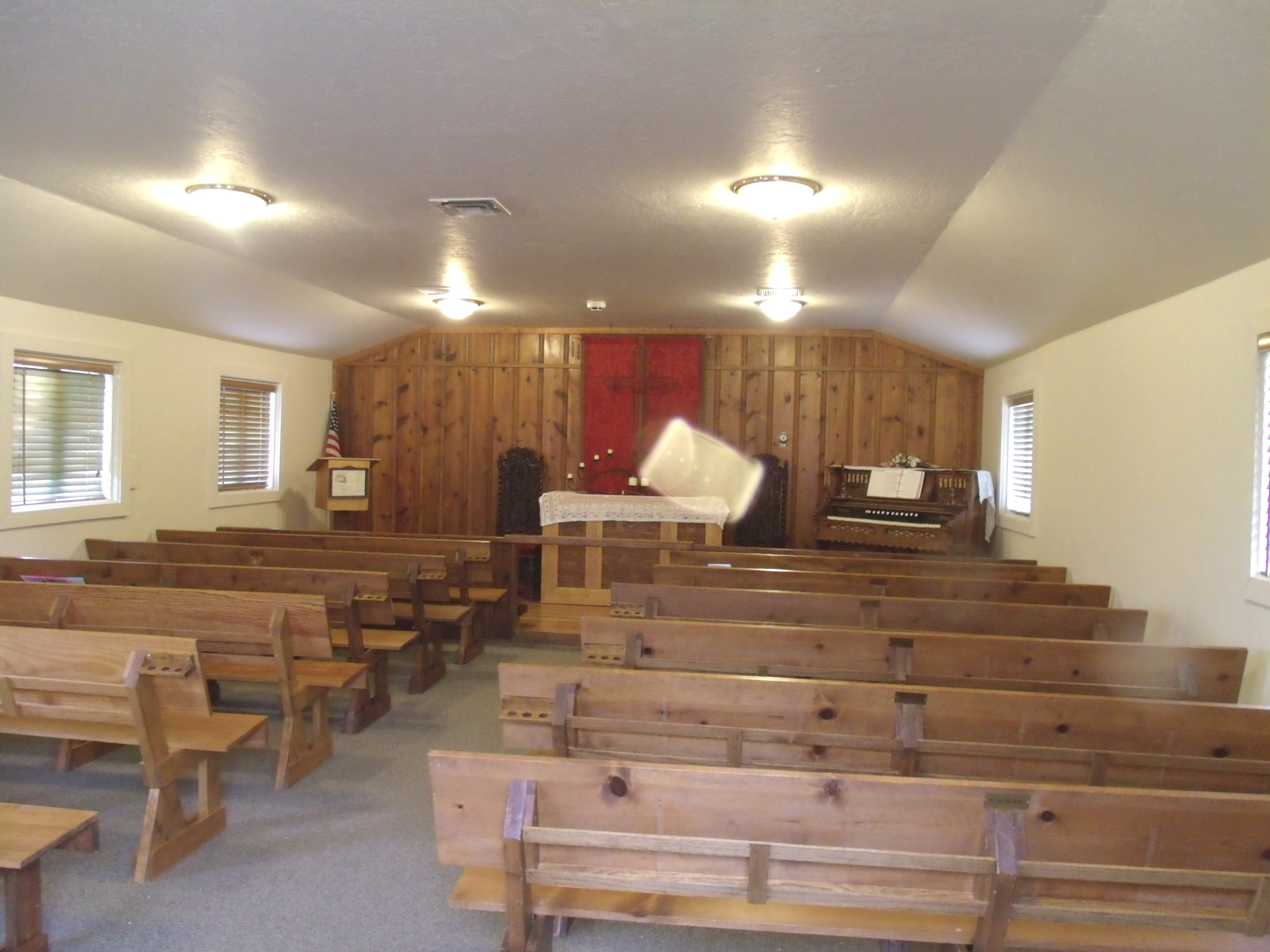
Inside the First Church of Cave Creek.

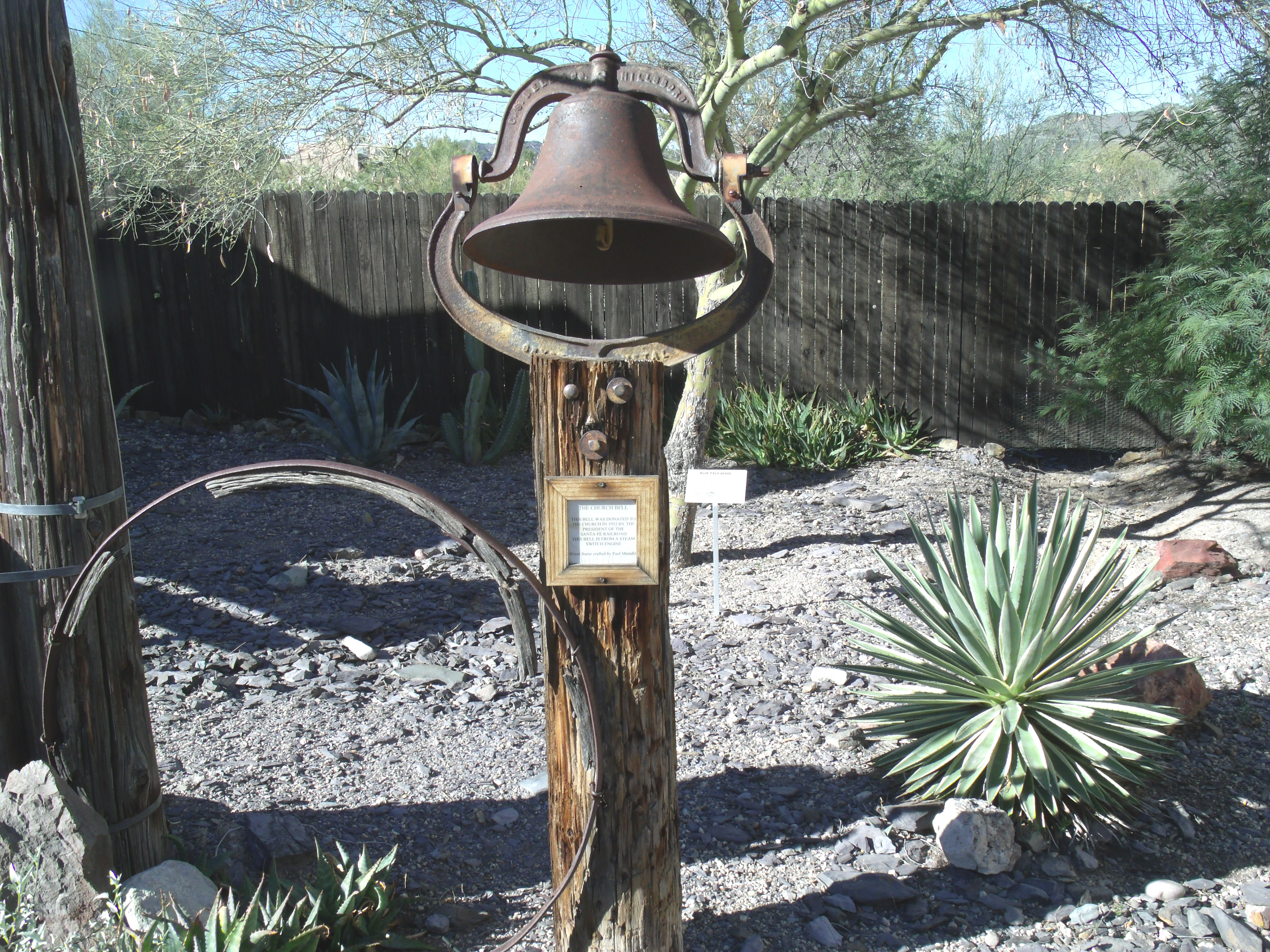
The bell of the First Church of Cave Creek.

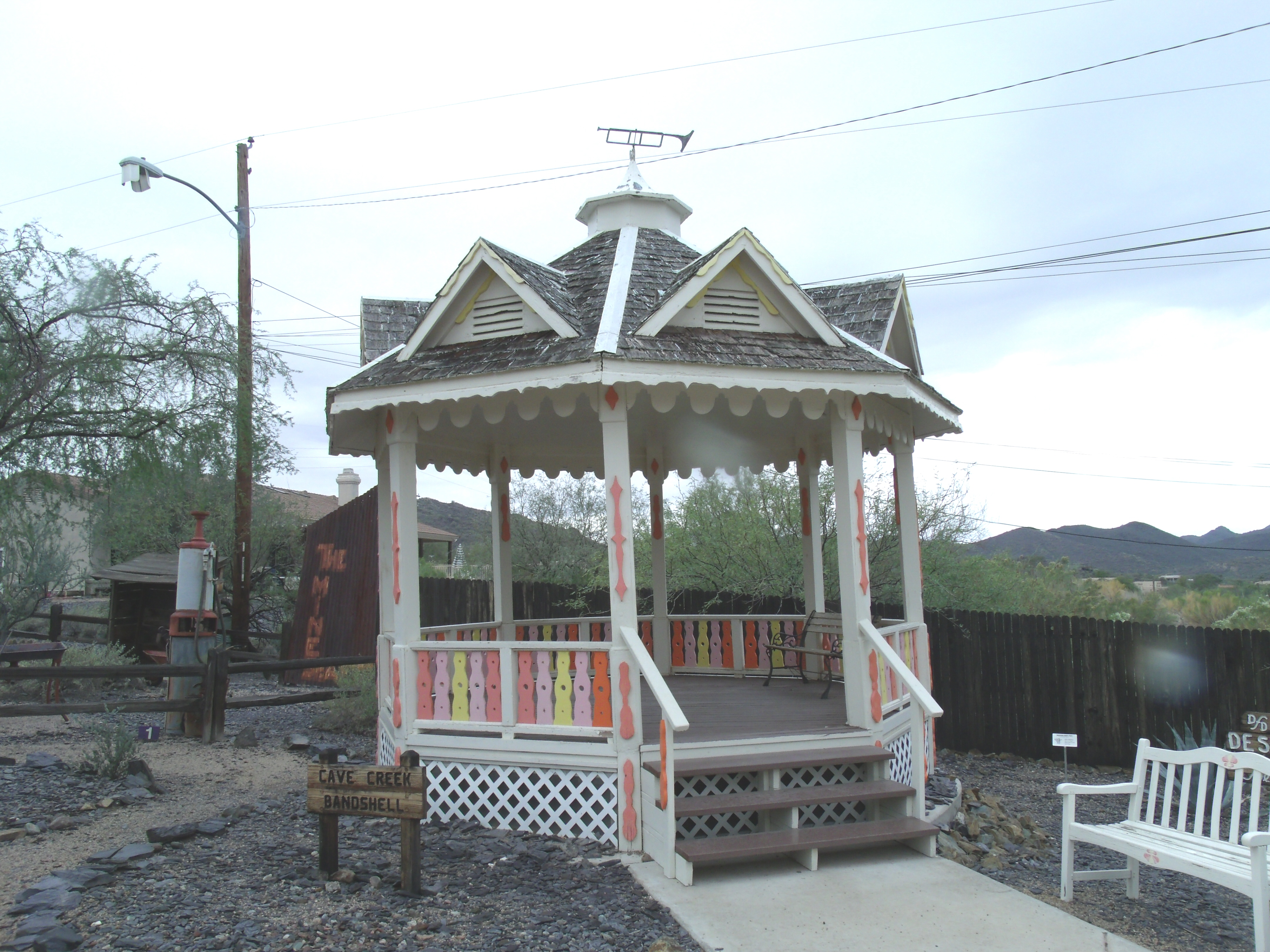
The Cave Creek Bandshell.

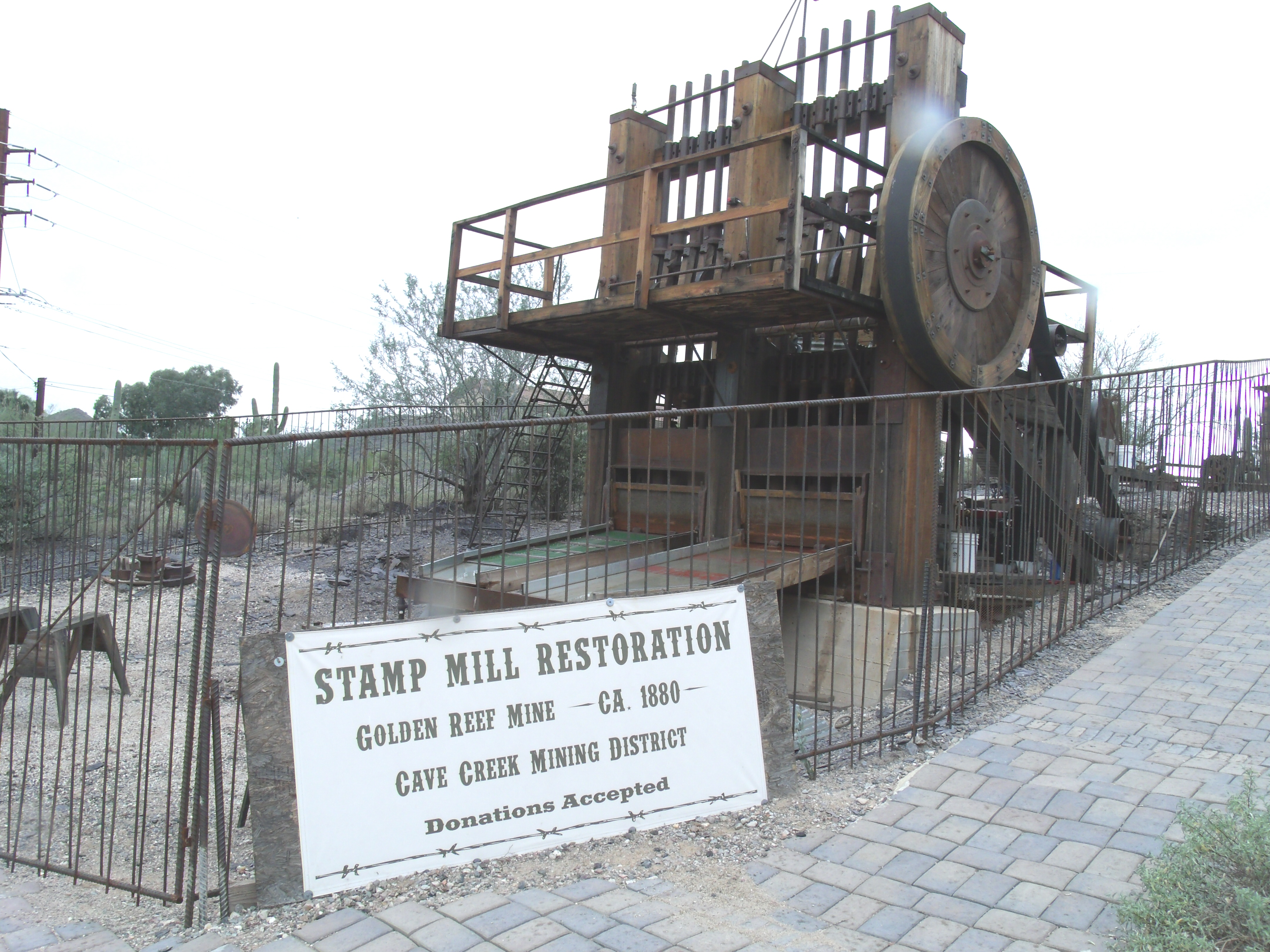
The Golden Reef Stamp Mill.

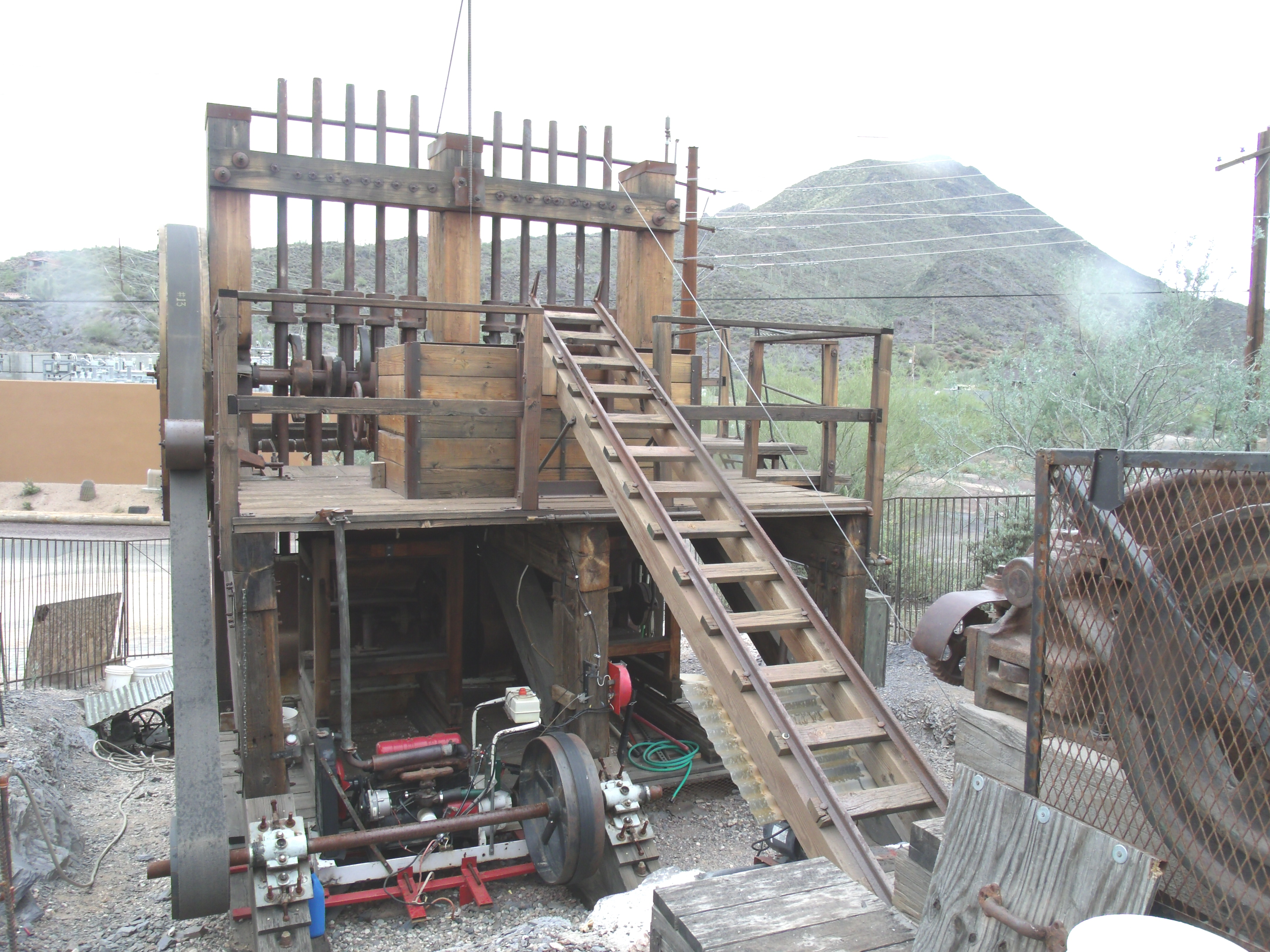
Different view of the Golden Reef Stamp Mill.

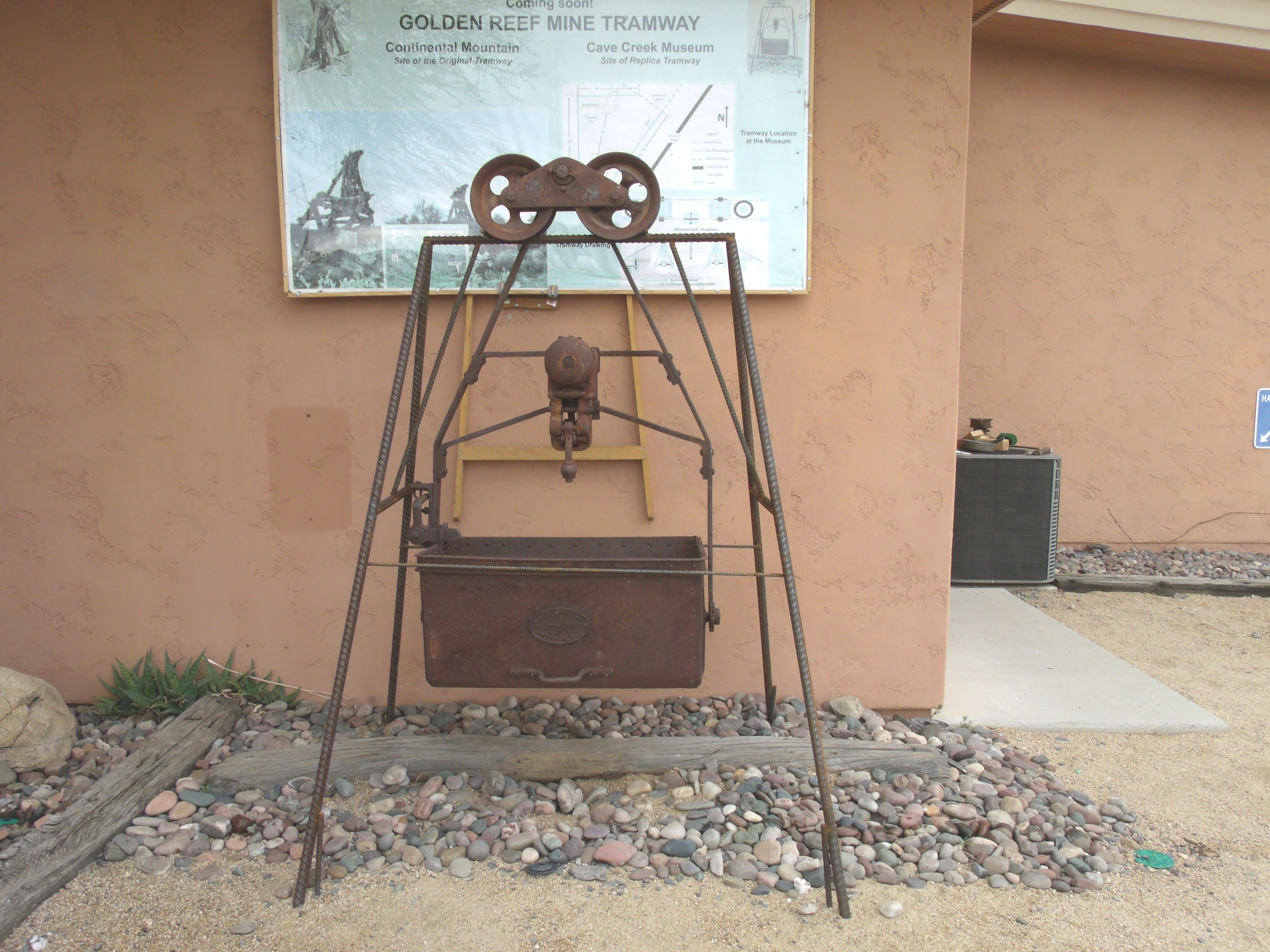
Golden Reef Mine Cableway Car.

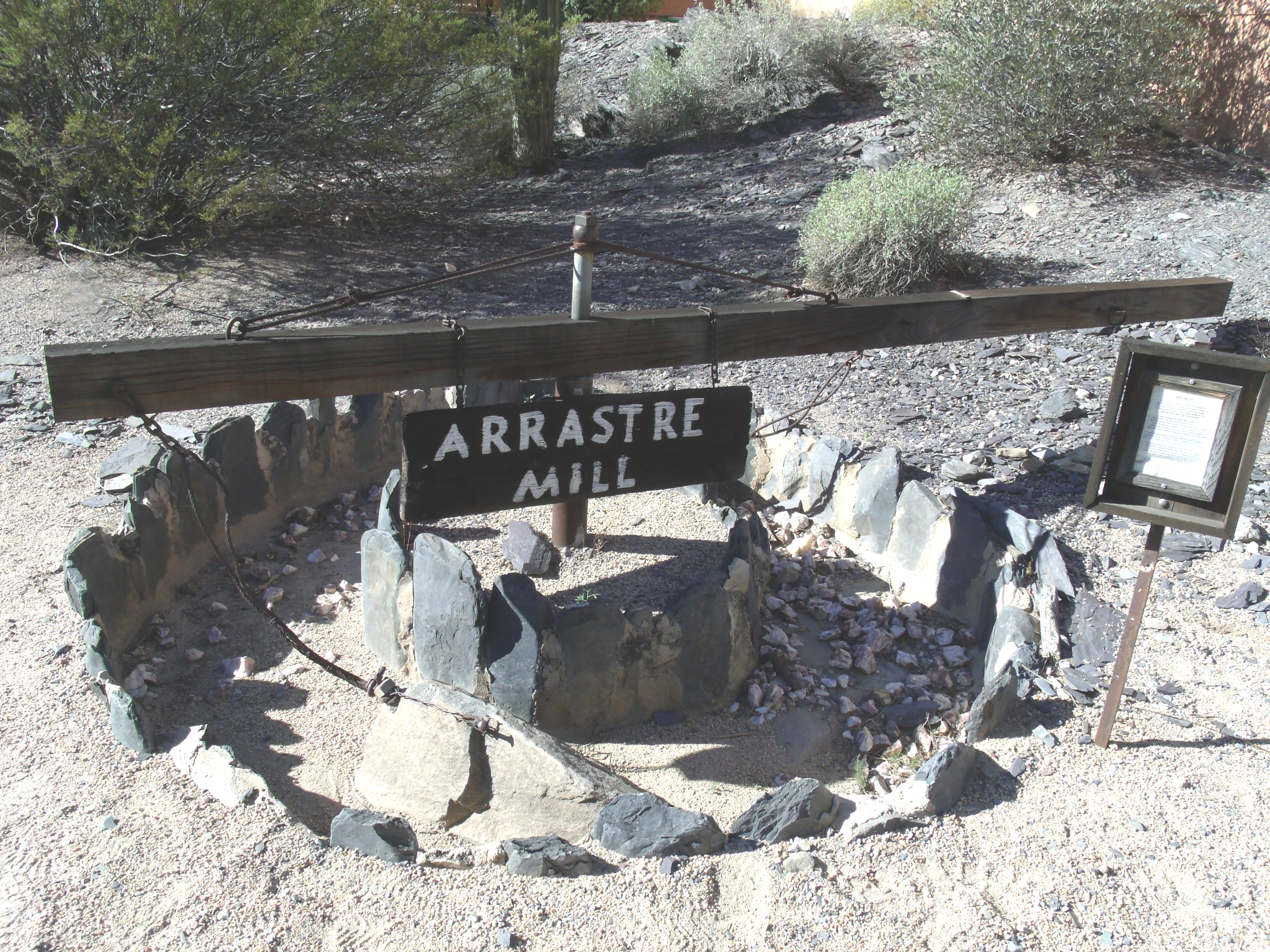
A Miner’s Arrastra.

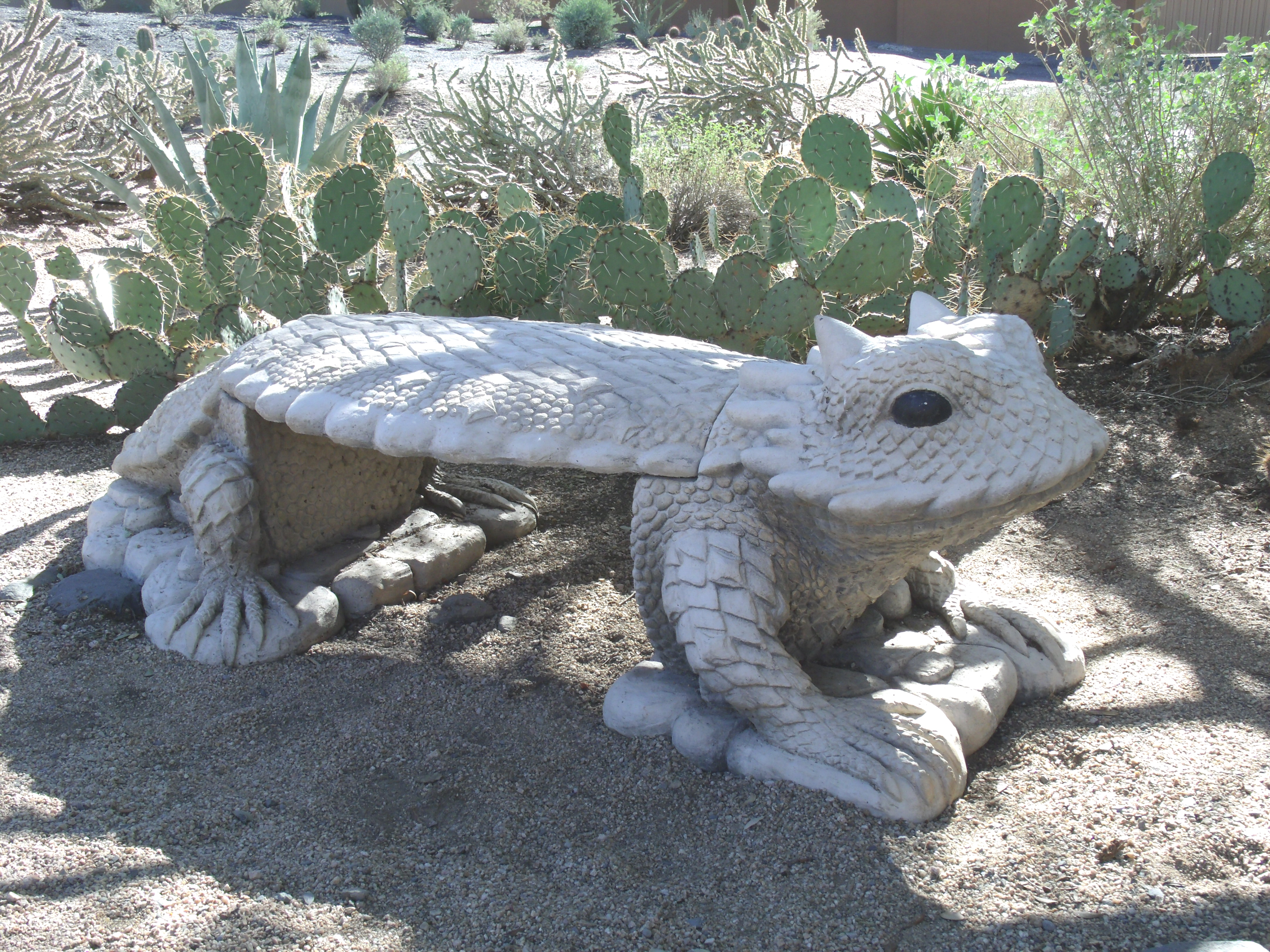
Cave Creek Museum lizard bench.

== See also ==
- Arizona Mining and Mineral Museum
- McCormick-Stillman Railroad Park
- Pioneer and Military Memorial Park
- Pioneer Living History Museum
