= I Remember Everything (disambiguation) =

I Remember Everything is a 2023 song by Zach Bryan featuring Kacey Musgraves

I Remember Everything may refer to:

== Films ==
- I Remember Everything, Richard, a 1966 film by Rolands Kalniņš

== Music ==
- "I Remember Everything", by Brandi Carlile, 2021
- "I Remember Everything", by Daisy Mallory, 2014
- "I Remember Everything", by John Prine, 2020
- "I Remember Everything", by Yoko Ono from Blueprint for a Sunrise, 2001
- "Remember Everything", by Five Finger Death Punch from American Capitalist, 2011
