= New York School of Applied Design for Women =

Art and design school in Manhattan, New York

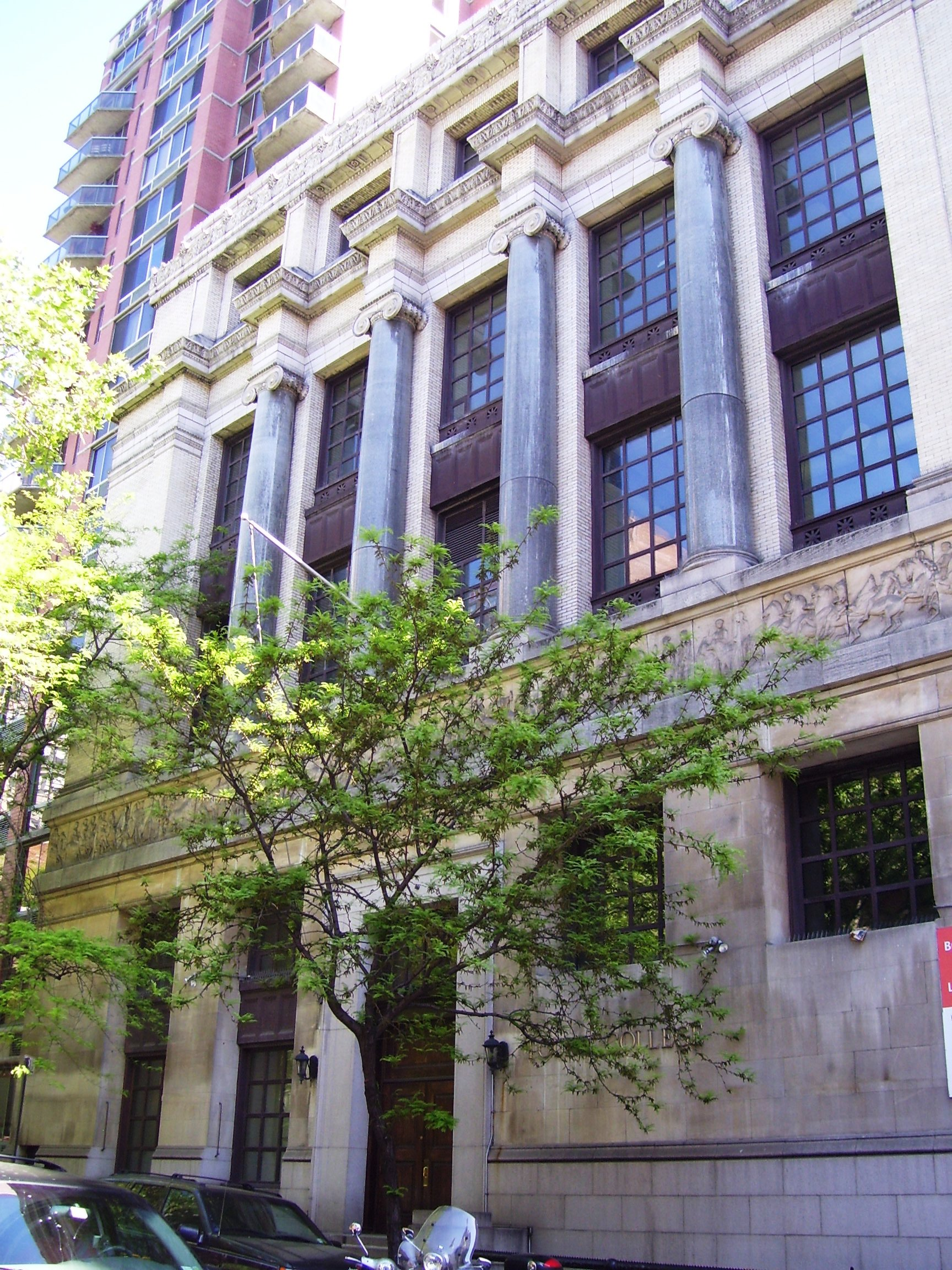
- Facade of the 160 Lexington Avenue building
- 350 Madison Avenue (1892–1909); 160 Lexington Avenue (1909–1944), when it was reorganized due to a merger; Manhattan, New York City, New York; United States

Information
- Type: Art and design school
- Established: 1892
- Founder: Ellen Dunlap Hopkins
- Organizational changes: Co-educational since 1944
- New York Phoenix School of Design (1944–1974): Merged with Phoenix Art Institute
- Pratt-New York Phoenix School of Design (1974–1979): Merged with Pratt Institute
- Pratt Manhattan Center (1979–1986): Renamed

The New York School of Applied Design for Women, established in 1892 by Ellen Dunlap Hopkins, was an early design school for women in New York City. The 1908 New York School of Applied Design building was designed by Harvey Wiley Corbett and is now landmarked.

The school became the New York Phoenix School of Design in 1944 when it merged with the Phoenix Art Institute, and in 1974, it merged with the Pratt Institute to form the Pratt-Phoenix School of Design. The building is now the site of Dover Street Market.

== Early years ==
The school, originally located at 200 West 23rd Street, was established in 1892. The founder and driving force of the school, Ellen Dunlap Hopkins, was involved in the academic program, fund-raising among wealthy individuals, management, and administration.

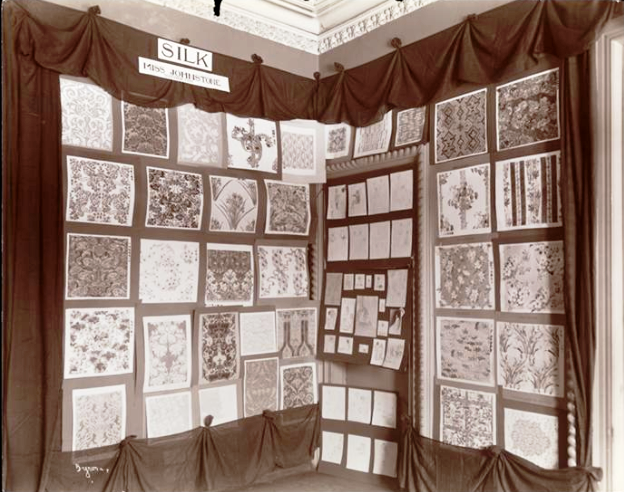
Design drawings for silk fabric exhibited at the New York School of Applied Design for Women; the instructor was Miss Johnstone.

Unique at its time for providing advanced education to working-class women, its purpose was that "of affording to women inspiration which may enable them to earn a livelihood by the employment of their taste and manual dexterity in the application of ornamental design to manufacture and the arts."

The school provided courses in illustration, book cover design, interior design, wallpaper and textile design, architecture, and a wide range of other art and design courses. The school, with an extensive art library, taught historic art and design classes for the students' first two years at the school. It employed Henry L. Parkhurst of Tiffany Glass and Decorating Company to teach book cover design; Paul de Longpré taught watercolor flower painting; Daniel Carter Beard taught animal drawing. The school arranged for the sale of artworks by graduates and students.

Its original directors were James Carroll Beckwith of the Art Students League of New York and the Metropolitan Museum of Art, Reverend Dr. John Wesley Brown of Saint Thomas Church, lawyer and statesman Elihu Root, and Ellen Dunlap Hopkins. Its later supporters included John D. Rockefeller, J. P. Morgan, and Adolph Lewisohn.

Within two years of operation, two of its students were the first women to join the New York Sketch Club, and a student was the first woman to have her work presented with male architects at the Architectural League.

The school outgrew its rented quarters and rented additional space an adjacent building. Harvey Wiley Corbett, an architect and instructor at the school, ran the Atelier Corbett and the school's architectural department, based upon the principles that he learned at the École des Beaux-Arts in France. When it was clear that a new building was needed, he engaged his students to work on the plans for the building, some paid at scale wages.

== 1908 landmark building ==
- New York School of Applied Design
- U.S. National Register of Historic Places
- New York State Register of Historic Places
- New York City Landmark
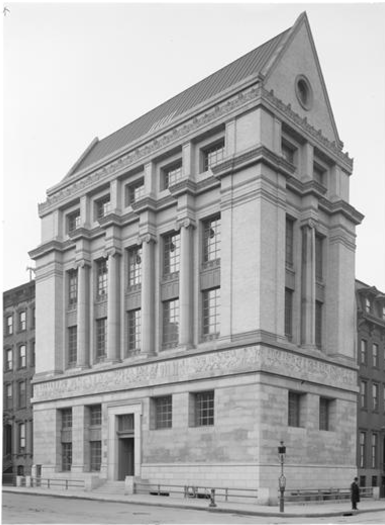
- New York School of Applied Design for Women at 160 Lexington Avenue, 1910
- Location: 160 Lexington Avenue; Manhattan, New York City
- Coordinates: 40°44′38″N 73°58′56″W
- Built: 1908
- Architect: Harvey Wiley Corbett
- Architectural style: Neoclassical architecture
- NRHP reference No.: 82001202
- NYSRHP No.: 06101.001756
- NYCL No.: 0949

Significant dates
- Added to NRHP: December 16, 1982
- Designated NYSRHP: October 29, 1982
- Designated NYCL: May 10, 1977

The New York School of Applied Design building, located at 160 Lexington Avenue on the northwest corner of East 30th Street, is a neoclassical building of terra cotta, brick, and stone. The five-story building, built in 1908 and 1909, was designed by architect Harvey Wiley Corbett of the firm Pell & Corbett, and funded by J. P. Morgan and John D. Rockefeller. The front entry on 30th Street has a double-paneled doorway and paneled spandrel, above which is a cornice and then a five-paned transom. Alongside the doorway are pilasters. The high ashlar base includes a bas-relief frieze made from casts of the Parthenon frieze held in the Elgin Marbles collection of the British Museum. Architectural features include ionic columns, a terra cotta entablature with classical moldings, and a terra cotta cornice with ornate acanthus scrolls and palmettes. On the fifth floor is a skylit studio. The steep gabled roof is made of tin and galvanized iron. By 1977, there had been no major changes to the original building design. When constructed in 1909, it was criticized in an Architecture magazine article as "drastically modern".

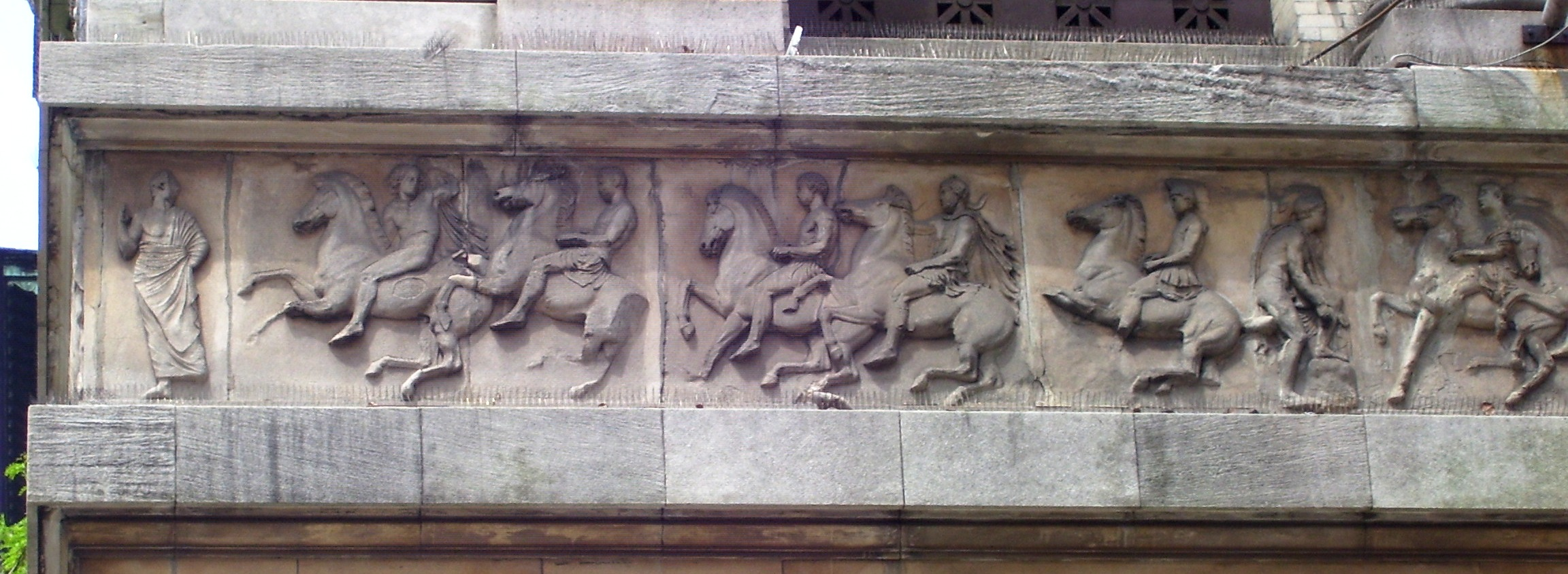
Part of the frieze on the Lexington Avenue side of the building

The building was designated a New York City Landmark in 1977 for its "special character, special historical and aesthetic interest and value as part of the development, heritage and cultural characteristics of New York City." The building was added to the National Register of Historic Places on December 16, 1982.

In 1986, the building no longer housed an art school. The building, purchased by Altro Health and Rehabilitation Services, was used as vocational training center. Touro College purchased the building in 1990 or 1991. In 1992, the building underwent a $750,000 renovation, led by the architectural firm Lemberger Brody Associates, and became the school's Lexington Avenue campus, It had ten classrooms, a library, two reading rooms, and a laboratory. The building retained its oversized windows and skylights. Classes began in September 1992. Touro sold it in 2006 to Lexington Landmark Properties. It is now the site of Dover Street Market, having undergone an architectural project that reflected the design aesthetics of founder Rei Kawakubo, which was implemented by architect Richard H. Lewis. The interior of the building includes a glass elevator, three 60-foot pillars, and art installations.

== Educational developments ==
By 1910, 4,000 women had attended the school. Beginning that year, an affiliation with Columbia University allowed the design school's students to take courses at Columbia for two years, and then enroll in Columbia. The affiliation continued until 1912 when the Atelier Columbia was established; Atelier Corbett was a forerunner of this organization. Austin W. Lord was also an instructor of architecture courses. In 1915, architect James Monroe Hewlett and Anne Dornin were architecture instructors.

For her role with the school, Dunlap Hopkins was awarded the Michael Friedsam Gold Medal. The citation stated, "Courageous leader in the education of women, student of the arts and friend of the artists, sympathetic teacher of young designers destined to improve by their work and their ideas the standards of art in industry, founder of the New York School of Applied Design and for 45 years its guide and counselor, devout adherent of the belief that the might of the fine design will make the right of successful industrial art." She died in 1939.

Architect Corbett became President of the school in 1938, a position he held until his death in 1954.

== Alumni ==
- Ruth Maxon Adams
- Ilse Bischoff
- Isabel Bishop
- Rosina Cox Boardman
- Bessie Marsh Brewer
- Minna Citron
- Mary Gannon and Alice Hands, cofounders of Gannon and Hands
- Minetta Good
- Dorothy Grider
- Martha Brookes Hutcheson
- Hildreth Meiere
- Eugenie Shonnard
- Nina Spalding Stevens

== Organizational changes ==
=== New York Phoenix School of Design ===
The school reincorporated as the co-educational New York Phoenix School of Design in 1944, after merging with the Phoenix Art Institute that was founded in 1925.

=== Merger with Pratt Institute ===
In 1974, the New York Phoenix School of Design merged with the Pratt Institute to form the Pratt-Phoenix School of Design, which offered three-year certificate programs in art and design. In 1979, it was renamed the Pratt Manhattan Center. In 1986, the building was sold and was no longer used as an art school. Records are archived at the Pratt Institute in Brooklyn, New York.

== In popular culture ==
On the CBS television show Person of Interest, the building at 160 Lexington Avenue was used in the 2011 pilot episode for exterior shots of the "Library" which was the base of operations for Harold Finch and his team.
