= Gannon and Hands =

Partnership of women architects in America

Practice information
- Partners: Mary Gannon, Alice Hands
- Founded: 1894
- Dissolved: c. 1900
- Location: New York City, U.S.

Gannon and Hands, founded in 1894 in New York, was the first all-female architecture firm in the United States. Its partners were Mary Gannon (1867-1932) and Alice Hands. In the firm's very short existence (1894 – c. 1900), it became known for innovative approaches to low-cost urban housing.

== Founders' early lives ==
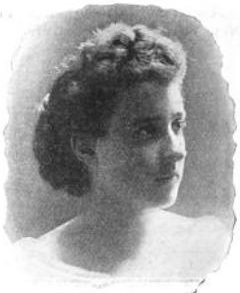
Mary Nevan Gannon

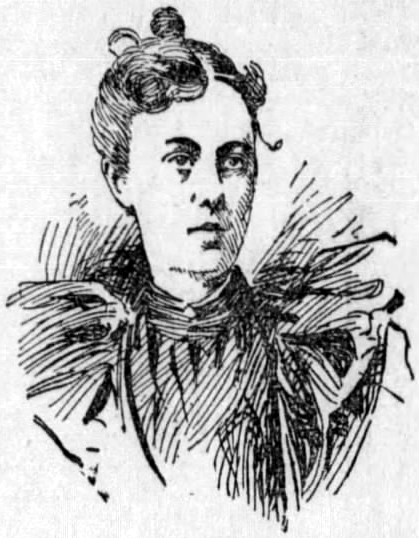
Alice J. Hands

Mary Nevan Gannon was born in Bethlehem, Pennsylvania, in 1867. With some prior experience in an architect's office, she entered the New York School of Applied Design for Women in 1892, as part of its first class. Her future partner Alice J. Hands was one of her classmates. Even less is known about Hands than about Gannon, apart from the fact that she had been studying at the New York City YWCA for a couple of years before entering New York School of Applied Design for Women (NYSAD). Gannon and Hands thrived at the school, winning awards for their drawings as well as architectural commissions while they were still students.

== Architectural work ==
Right after graduating in 1894, the two women opened their own architectural practice, Gannon and Hands, and in that same year they won a large commission to design a hospital in San Francisco with a project budget in the neighborhood of $30,000–$40,000. After the Florence Hospital was opened, it received praise from physicians as a model of "sanitation, convenience, and architectural beauty."

Early in their career, Gannon and Hands joined a city task force, the Sanitary Investigations Committee, and went the extra step of living in a New York tenement in order to better understand urban living conditions for the poor. Calling New York's tenements "a reproach to the humanitarianism of this enlightened century," they set to work to find better solutions to urban housing for the poor. The firm quickly became noted for designing innovative apartment buildings that were affordable, sanitary, well-ventilated, and practical. One of their model tenements was designed around a central court (for light and air), with balconies for each apartment, front and rear fire escapes, and ash chutes and garbage receptacles for refuse management. Some were specifically designed for the rising class of young urban working women, and the partners were elected to the Women's Health Protective Association of New York.

Gannon and Hands were praised by the social reformer Jacob Riis in his book A Ten Years' War (1900) for their light and airy buildings; he credited them with solving "the problem of building a decent tenement on a twenty-five-foot lot"—a problem he admitted that he himself had thought insoluble. Similarly, philanthropist Sir Sidney Waterlow, who was chairman of the Improved Industrial Dwellings Company in London, called their work "the best plans for single tenements I have ever seen, the most clever and ingenious." As late as the 1930s, their apartment designs were still being reproduced as models of low-cost housing.

Other buildings Gannon and Hands designed include a hotel in New York, a women's club building in New York, a summer home for women students in Twilight Park, seaside cottages in New Jersey, and mountain cabins in the Catskills. There was also a lavish, $50,000 villa designed for a California client and modeled on the Russian tsar's Livadia Palace. They were known for overseeing the actual building work themselves, except when an engineer was needed.

In 1897, Mary Gannon married John Walp Doutrich and that same year the firm moved to a more upscale neighborhood, indicating that it had achieved a degree of success. However, there is little information about Gannon and Hands post-1900, which is around the time that Gannon moved with her husband and new son to Spokane, Washington. It is likely that the firm disbanded early in the new century.

== Selected buildings ==
- Hotel for Women, 7th Ave. and 37th St., New York
- Women's Hotel, Broadway and 37th St., New York
- Student Apartment House, 20th St., New York
- Florence Hospital, San Francisco
