= Minetta Good =

American painter (1895–1946)

- Born: 1895; New York City, New York, U.S.
- Died: 1946 (aged 50–51); New York City, New York, U.S.
- Other names: Minnetta Good
- Education: Cooper Union, New York School of Applied Design for Women, Art Students League of New York
- Occupation: Artist

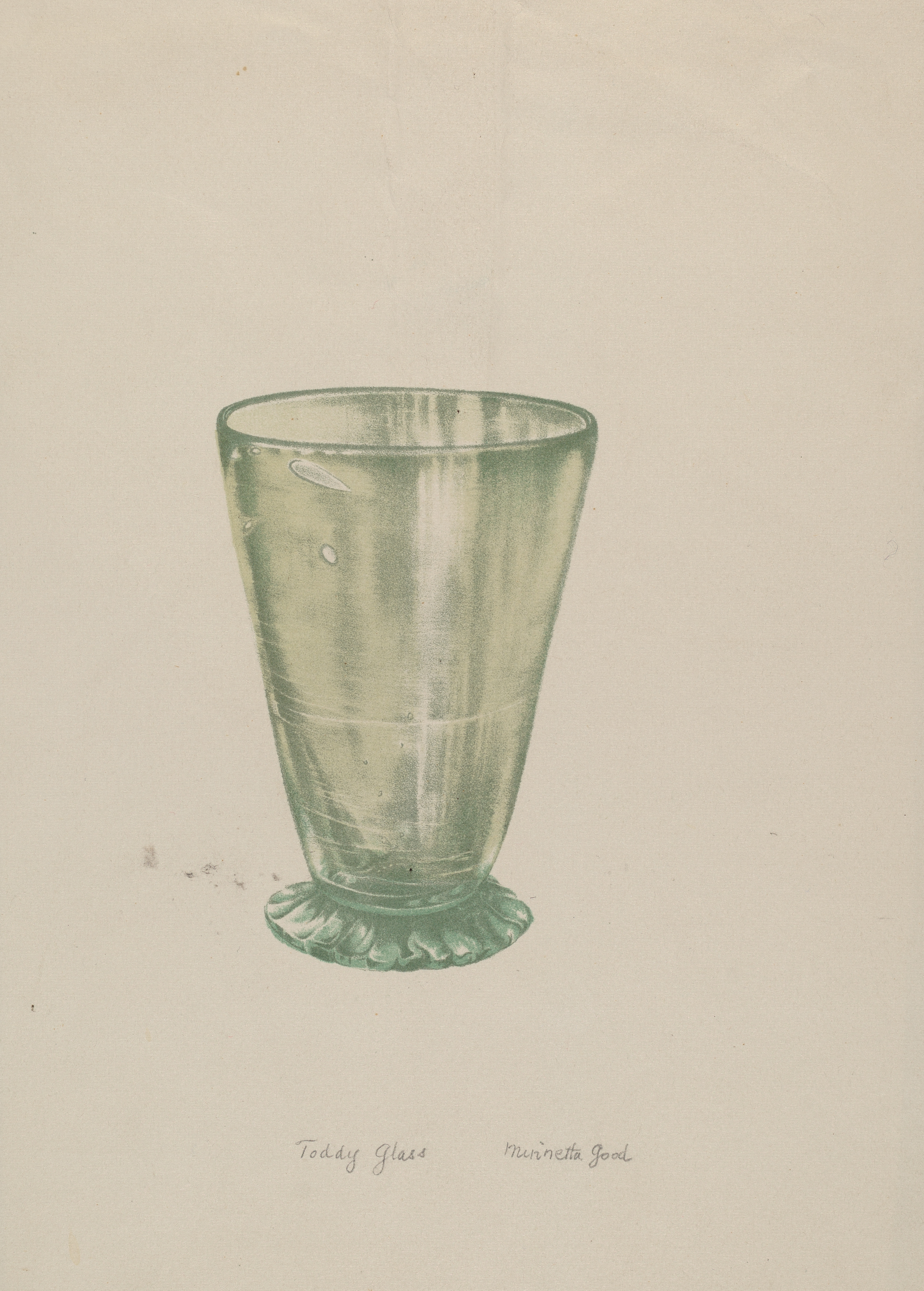
Good's lithograph Toddy Glass, 1935/1942, from the collection of the National Gallery of Art

Minetta Good, also known as Minnetta Good (1895–1946), was an American painter and printmaker who was part of the Works Progress Administration (WPA). Her work often depicted farm scenes, family life, and/or transportation.

== Biography ==
Born in 1895 in New York City. Good attended Cooper Union and New York School of Applied Design for Women. Good studied at the Art Students League of New York with F. Luis Mora, and Robert Henri and received training from Cecilia Beaux.

For much of the 1920s and 1930s Good lived in Califon and Freehold, New Jersey. She won many prizes through the National Association of Women Painters and Sculptors, including the 1932 Eloise Egan Prize for best landscape painting. She was one of the founders of the Salons of America, and exhibited widely throughout the United States.

During the Great Depression she produced work for the Federal Art Project, including the Index of American Design. She created two murals for post offices in Dresden, Tennessee, and St. Martinville, Louisiana, for the Section of Painting and Sculpture. The Dresden mural, "Retrospection" (1938) depicts early days of the county and is still located in this original post office location.

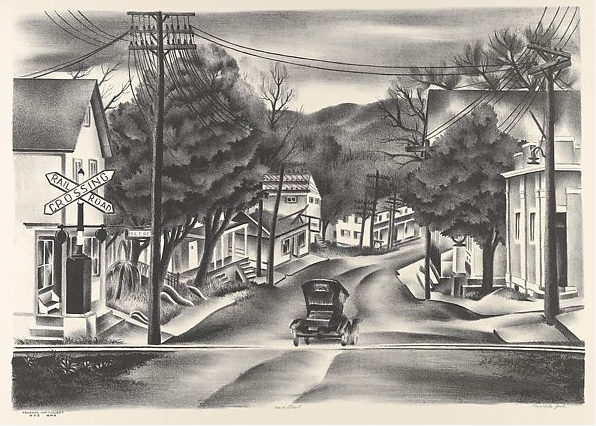
Minetta Good, Main Street, c. 1935-40, lithograph, Metropolitan Museum of Art

Good created five murals at St. Martinsville, and one was relocated to a new post office location, the original location feature four circular ceiling light decorations in the lobby, depicting the magnolia, the azalea, the crawfish and the pelican painted in oils on canvas. At the St. Martinsville post office there was a larger painting of Evangeline, seated under an Evangeline Oak tree along the Bayou Teche with colorful water hyacinths and in the background is the Catholic church. Her work may be found in the National Gallery of Art.

== Death and legacy ==
Good died in 1946, at age 51 in New York City, New York.

Good's art work is found in many public museum collections including at the Metropolitan Museum of Art, National Gallery of Art, Smithsonian American Art Museum. Art Institute of Chicago, Illinois State Museum, Iowa State University Museums, University of Massachusetts Amherst Gallery, Pennsylvania Academy of the Fine Arts, Newark Museum, University of Wyoming Art Museum, David Owsley Museum of Art Ball State University, among others.

== See also ==
- List of Federal Art Project artists
