= Warren King (cartoonist) =

American cartoonist (1916–1978)

Warren King (January 3, 1916 – February 9, 1978) was a cartoonist best noted for his political cartoons.

King grew up on Long Island and received a B.S. from Fordham University in 1938. King was trained as a painter and attended the Phoenix Art Institute and the Grand Central School of Art. During World War II, Warren King served with the Army Air Corps, where his college education and artistic skills were both valued. He was honorably discharged in 1946 and returned to NYC to resume his career in illustration. In 1955, King became editorial cartoonist for the New York Daily News after working as Rube Goldberg's assistant.

He received the National Cartoonist Society Editorial Cartoon Award for 1968 as well as several Freedoms Foundation awards. He was a member of NCS and the Association of American of Editorial Cartoonists.

King retired in 1977 and died in Connecticut on February 9, 1978.
