= Franklin Booth =

American artist

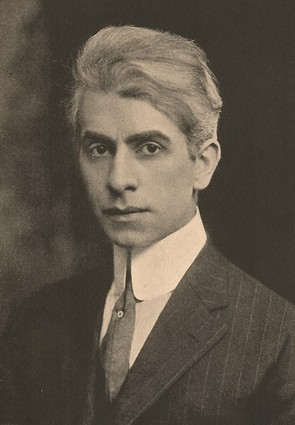
- Born: Jay Franklin Booth; July 18, 1874; Carmel, Indiana
- Died: August 25, 1948 (aged 74); New York, New York
- Resting place: Old Carmel Cemetery, Carmel, Indiana; 39.986°N 86.126°W
- Education: School of the Art Institute of Chicago; Art Students League of New York
- Known for: Illustrations
- Awards: Society of Illustrators Hall of Fame; 1983

Franklin Booth (July 18, 1874 – August 25, 1948) Was an American artist known for his detailed pen-and-ink illustrations. He had a unique illustration style based upon his early recreation of wood engraving illustrations with pen and ink. His skill as a draftsman and style made him a popular magazine illustrator in the early 20th century. He was one of the first modern ex libris designers in the United States.

Using watercolor, Booth created book illustrations, such as James Whitcomb Riley's The Flying Islands of the Night. During World War I, he created posters for recruitment, fundraising, and other efforts. As Art Deco style illustrations became popular, his work in latter years was found in commercial publications and catalogs. Although he "believe[d] in schools to a certain extent" at one point in his career, he co-founded the Phoenix Art Institute and was an educator for 21 years. He was inducted into the Society of Illustrators Hall of Fame.

== Early life and education ==
Jay Franklin Booth was born in 1874 and raised on a farm near Carmel, Indiana. His parents, Susan Wright and John Thomas Booth, had eight children. Booth, the third child, attended the Quaker Academy at Westfield.

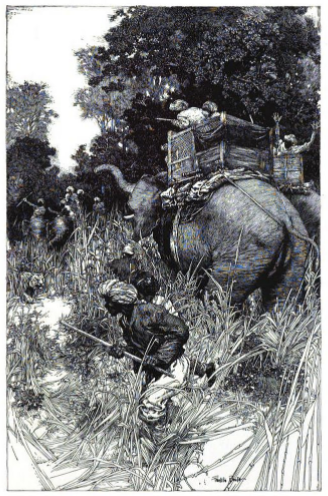
Franklin Booth, illustration for McClure's Magazine by 1914

As a boy, he was determined to become an artist. He studied pictures in books and magazines, including Scribner's and Harper's. His unusual technique was the result of his having scrupulously copied magazine illustrations which he thought were pen-and-ink drawings, but were, in fact, wood engravings. As a result, this led him to developing a style of drawing composed of thousands of lines, whose careful positioning next to one another produced variations in density and shade. The characteristics of his art were his scale extremes with large buildings and forests looming over tiny figures, decorative scrolls and borders, classic hand lettering and gnarled trees.

He expressed his view of formal education, "I believe in schools to a certain extent, yet I think a knowledge of art is not a thing held in trust by any, but is, rather, universal and comes to them who hunger and thirst after it." He took a correspondence course in art while he lived in Indiana, and studied for three months each at the School of the Art Institute of Chicago and the Art Students League of New York.

== Career ==
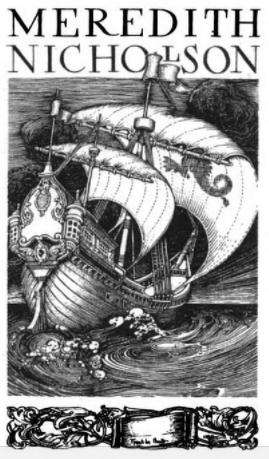
Franklin Booth, Nicholson Bookplate, by 1910

His skilled draftsmanship and unique style made him a popular illustrator. He was considered "the best pen-and-ink man in America" by an editor of a leading magazine. Despite the laboriousness of his technique, Booth's compositions were characterised by a grand sense of space. As a result, his drawings were often well-matched to poetic or editorial entries. With the advent of the "clean, smooth, and continuous lines" of the Art Deco style illustrations, his works in latter years were found in commercial publications and catalogs.

Booth's first illustrations, created for his verses, appeared in the Indianapolis News, and he was on the staff there from 1899 to 1904. He then traveled to Rome, Paris and Spain. Beginning in 1904 or 1905, he worked on the New York Daily News. He also worked briefly at newspapers in Boston and Washington as an illustrator. Creator of the Nicholson plate, engraved in copper, he was one of the first modern ex libris designers in the United States. He created a gift bookplate for the Indiana State Library.

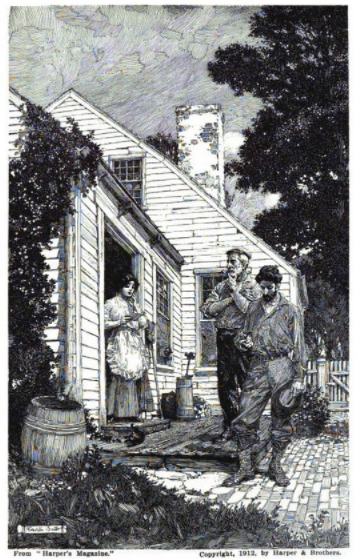
Franklin Booth, illustration for Harper's Magazine, 1912

Booth's illustrations appeared in popular magazines, like Scribner's, Good Housekeeping, Collier's, Harper's Magazine, and The Saturday Evening Post. He illustrated James Oppenheim's short stories for American magazine by 1914.

Booth created advertising art for organizations, such as Rolls-Royce, Whitman's Candy, Bulova Watches, General Electric, Procter & Gamble, Paramount Pictures, and Estey Organ. He also created illustrations for several Victor-Victrola record covers.

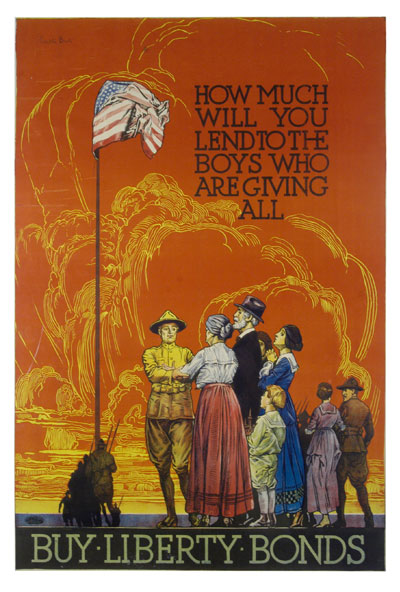
Franklin Booth, Liberty Bonds poster, World War I, 1914-1918

Booth contributed to World War I by illustrating recruitment posters, US savings bonds envelopes, booklets and death certificates for American soldiers who perished in France and Belgium, and work for the Red Cross.

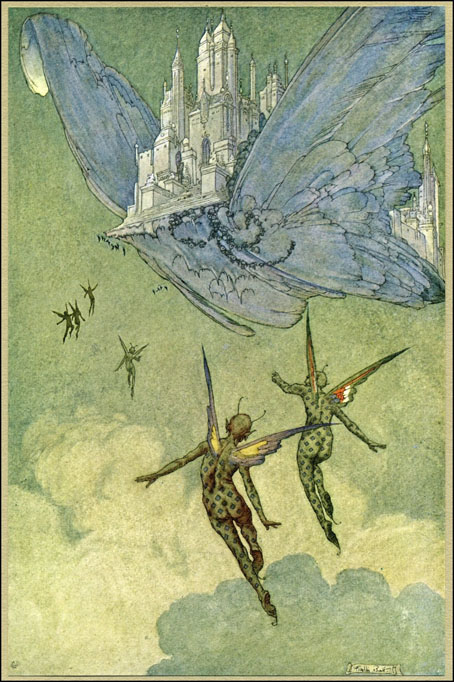
Franklin Booth, illustration for Flying Islands by James Whitcomb Riley, 1913

He illustrated books like James Whitcomb Riley's The Flying Islands of the Night (1913), which included multiple plates of his watercolor images. "It includes Booth's open compositions and attention to classical forms, with skies filled with soft quiet washes of hues in place of fields of tone." The book, A Hoosier Holiday (1916), chronicled the two-week automobile trip that Booth took with Theodore Dreiser from New York to Terre Haute, Indiana, Riley's hometown. It included 30 or 32 charcoal sketches of cities, small towns, and rural settings that Booth made along their voyage in Booth's Pathfinder touring car. It was the first book about travel via automobile. He illustrated Mark Twain's The Prince and the Pauper (1917); Meredith Nicholson's The Poet, and Five-Foot Book Shelf, one of the Harvard Classics editions.

In 1925, he co-founded the Phoenix Art Institute and was an educator there for 21 years. An edition of his work, "Sixty Reproductions from Original Drawings", was published in 1925 by Robert Frank. In 1934 and 1935, he wrote a series of articles about the art of illustration for the Professional Art Quarterly.

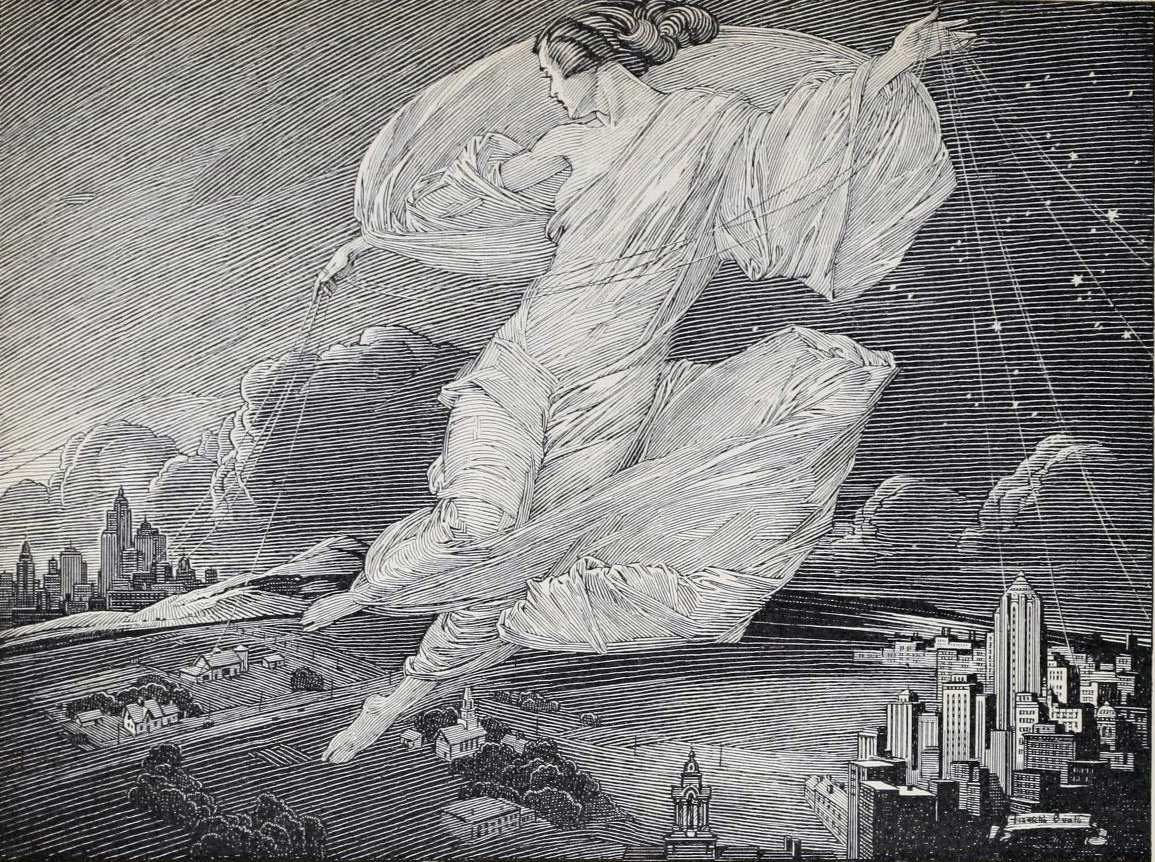
Franklin Booth, A Continent Is Bridged, an illustration for the 25th anniversary of transcontinental telephone service.

Other contributions include illustrating the annual Telephone Almanac by 1940. "A Continent Is Bridged", an illustration by Franklin Booth, was drawn for the Atlantic Telephone & Telegraph Company for the observance of the twenty-fifth anniversary of transcontinental telephone service in 1940.

He created illustrations—like of a black-eyed susan and box turtle—for several stamps for a 1941 wildlife conservation series by the National Wildlife Federation. During his career, he helped develop a process of permanent reproduction of line design on titles and aluminum with the Reynolds Metals Company.

William H. Block Company sold a number of his drawings in 1946. In 1947, the book 20 Franklin Booth Masterpieces was published. He was a member of the Guild Freelance Artists and the Society of Illustrators.

== Personal life ==
Booth lived for a short time in the suburban city of New Rochelle, a well known artist colony. Its residents including well-known artists like Norman Rockwell. He then settled in a studio on 57th Street in New York City. He spent his summers in Indiana, where he was friends with James Whitcomb Riley, a poet.

As an adult, he identified himself as a Socialist and a Christian Scientist. He married Beatrice Wittmack, one of his models, in 1923 when he was 49 years of age. In 1946, Booth suffered an incapacitating stroke and died on August 25, 1948 in his studio in New York City. His wife survived him. There was no mention of children in his obituaries. His ashes were scattered over his parents' gravestone in Carmel, Indiana.

== Legacy ==
In February 2001, the United States Postal Service released commemorative stamps of 20 "American Illustrators" with the header by Franklin Booth.

Books about him and his illustrations include Franklin Booth: American Illustrator (2006) by editor Manuel Auad and Franklin Booth: Painter with a Pen (2002) by John Fleskes.

== Quotations ==
- "I have always admired the beauty of Franklin Booth's work and regard him as an exponent of the very best in American Illustration". ~ Norman Rockwell.
- "Booth's pen-and-inks have the lush richness of a fine old tapestry plus an exciting imagination". ~ James Montgomery Flagg.
- "I have always stood spellbound before one of Booth's noble pen paintings. They recall today the Golden Age of American Illustration when such giants as Pyle, Abbey, Remington, and Gibson set a standard hard to reach. Booth earned his place beside such men as These". ~ Dean Cornwell.
- "I still wish I could do a pen drawing the way Franklin Booth handled them. The present-day student who wants quick success should be forced to copy a few of his illustrations just for the discipline. I used to do them just for the love of it". ~ Milton Caniff.

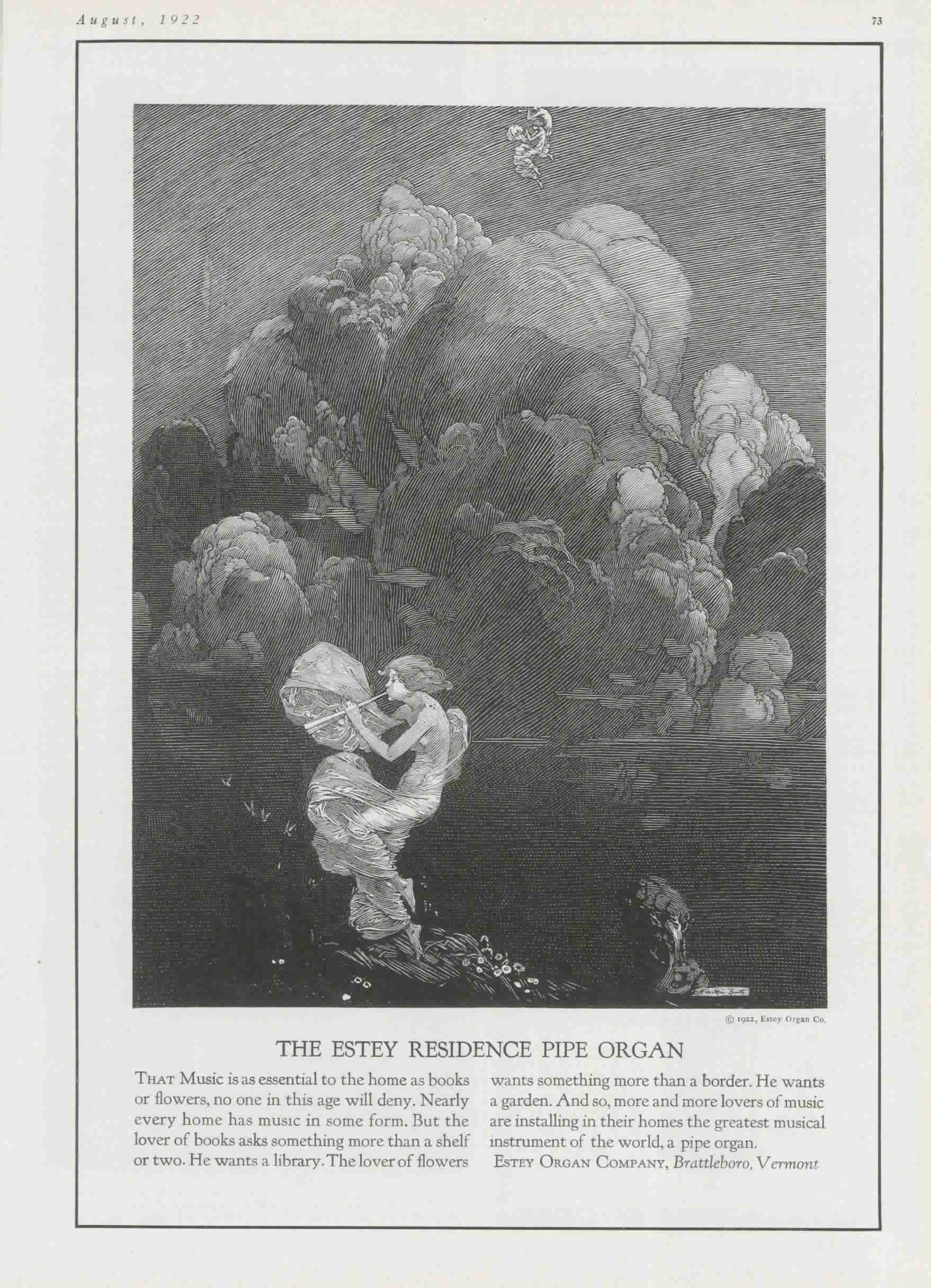
Franklin Booth - ad for Estey Organ, House & Garden, August 1922
