= Nina Spalding Stevens =

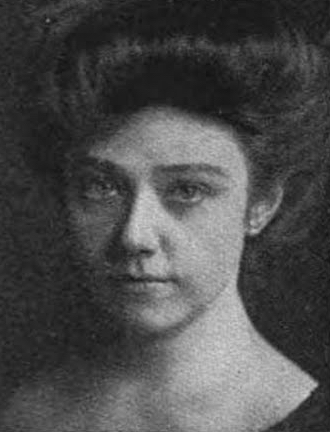
Nina Spalding Stevens, from a 1912 publication.

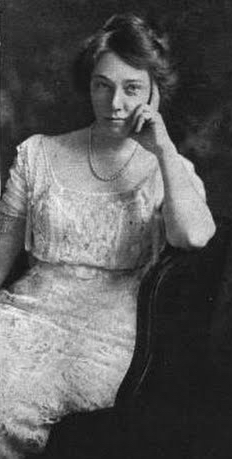
Nina Spalding Stevens, from a 1916 publication.

Nina Spalding Stevens (January 29, 1876 – March 11, 1959) was an American writer and museum director.

== Early life ==
Nina de Garmo Spalding was born in Port Huron, Michigan, the only child of Edgar Goldsmith Spalding and Leonora D. Buel Spalding. Her father was a veteran of the American Civil War and a banker in Michigan. She studied at the New York School of Applied Design for Women and was a member of the Art Students' League in New York.

== Career ==
=== Toledo Museum of Art ===
Nina Spalding Stevens was appointed assistant director of the Toledo Museum of Art in 1904; her husband George W. Stevens was director. She was active in developing collections, planning and publicizing exhibits. She especially took charge of organizing activities, including women's study groups, tours, and lectures. She founded and was first president of the Athena Art Society, one of the oldest women's art organizations in the United States, in 1903. The couple worked with the museum's president, glass manufacturer Edward Libbey, and they were among his heirs when he died in 1925. She stayed with the Toledo Museum of Art after George Stevens died, remaining an assistant director when a new director was appointed. She traveled to France on museum business in 1927. In Paris she made contacts in museum work, and eventually took lead in assembling and funding an exhibit of pre-Columbian objects at Toledo in 1928, based on a similar show in Paris the previous year. It was "the first major exhibition of ancient arts from across the Americas in an American art museum".

=== Writings and other activities ===
Nina de Garmo Spalding wrote a children's book, The Story of Jason (1900), and an article about traveling in Holland for a Catholic periodical.

Nina Spalding Stevens's short stories and articles were published in various publications. She wrote about traveling to the Grand Canyon in a party with East Coast artists, including Thomas Moran, Elliott Daingerfield, Frederick Ballard Williams, and Edward Henry Potthast. She wrote a posthumous biography of George W. Stevens, recounting much of their work together in the museum's early years. She was a founder of the Toledo Girl Scout Council, chartered in 1917.

== Personal life ==
Nina Spalding married twice. Her first husband was George W. Stevens; they married in 1902, and she was widowed when he died in 1926. She was briefly married a second time, in 1929, to a young French museologist Georges Henri Rivière; he was gay, and theirs was a marriage of convenience (a mariage blanc in French). They socialized as a couple when she was in Paris, and worked together on museum projects, until they formally divorced in 1934. She lived in France in her later life, and died in 1959, aged 83 years, in Monte Carlo.
