= Cave Creek, Arizona =

- Town
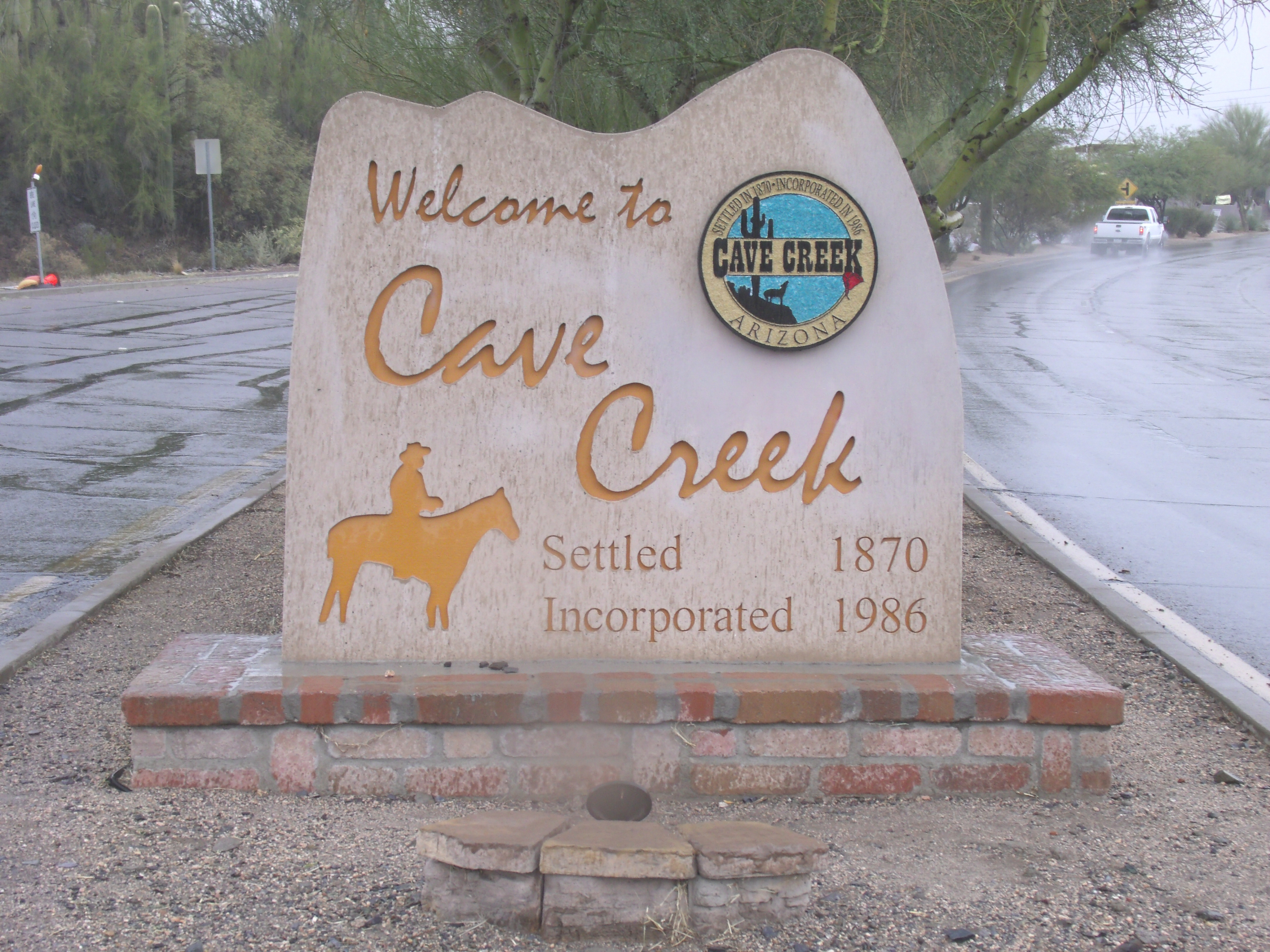
- Welcome marker

- Seal
- Motto: Where the Wild West Lives
- Location in Maricopa County, Arizona

- Location within Arizona Location within the United States
- Coordinates: 33°51′05″N 111°58′48″W
- Country: United States
- State: Arizona
- County: Maricopa
- Established: 1870

Government
  - Type: Town Manager - council government
  - Mayor: Robert Morris

Area
  - Total: 37.71 sq mi (97.68 km^{2})
  - Land: 37.71 sq mi (97.66 km^{2})
  - Water: 0.0077 sq mi (0.02 km^{2})
- Elevation: 2,553 ft (778 m)

Population (2020)
  - Total: 4,892
  - Density: 129.7/sq mi (50.09/km^{2})
- Time zone: UTC−7 (MST (no DST))
- ZIP Codes: 85327, 85331
- Area code: 480
- FIPS code: 04-11300
- GNIS feature ID: 2413182
- Website: www.cavecreekaz.gov

Cave Creek is a town in Maricopa County, Arizona, United States. It is part of the Phoenix metropolitan area. As of the 2020 census, the population of the town was 4,892.

== History ==
Cave Creek was settled in 1870 by soldiers on horseback from Fort McDowell. In 1873, prospectors from the Bradshaw Mountains found gold in the town. The town is named for the cave next to the creek the town was founded on. The town was incorporated in 1986.

== Geography ==
Cave Creek is a town in the Sonoran Desert. It sits in northern Maricopa County on the northern edge of Scottsdale, with mountains rising to the north that eventually connect with the New River Mountains and the Black Hills. It is 33 miles (53 km) north of downtown Phoenix, although the Phoenix city limits extend north to Cave Creek's southern border. The town is bordered to the east by the town of Carefree, to the west by unincorporated New River and Desert Hills, and to the north by Tonto National Forest. Elephant Mountain rises to an elevation of 3,926 feet (1,197 m) in the northernmost part of the town. Local landmark Black Mountain, elevation 3,398 feet (1,036 m), is in the southern part of town on the border with Carefree.

According to the United States Census Bureau, the town of Cave Creek has a total area of 37.7 square miles (98 km^{2}), of which 0.008 square miles (0.021 km^{2}), or 0.02%, are listed as water. Cave Creek flows through the western side of the town southward into Phoenix, where it disappears into the Salt River valley.

In 2000, the state of Arizona, Maricopa County, and the town of Cave Creek bought Spur Cross Ranch, a 2,154-acre (8.72 km^{2}) tract of Sonoran desert just north of Phoenix, for $21 million. It had unusual cacti, stone formations, and hundreds of pre-historic Hohokam Indian tribal artifacts, and is now a Maricopa County park.

=== Climate ===
Cave Creek is located in a semi-arid climate, receiving more rainfall than a desert climate. Cave Creek is at a higher elevation, and therefore is cooler than the lower elevations of the Phoenix area. The hot season lasts for 3.5 months, from May 31 to September 19, with an average daily high temperature at or above 93 °F (34 °C). The hottest month of the year is July, with an average high of 102 °F (39 °C) and low of 74 °F (23 °C).

The cool season lasts for 3.4 months, from November 20 to March 1, with an average daily high temperature below 69 °F (21 °C). The coldest month of the year is January, with an average low of 37 °F (3 °C) and high of 65 °F (18 °C).

In July–September, the North American monsoon season brings rain and thunderstorms to the Cave Creek area. The wettest month of the year is August, with an average of 6 days of rain, and averaging 1.77 inches (45 mm).

Climate data for Cave Creek, Arizona, 1907–1961
Month	Jan	Feb	Mar	Apr	May	Jun	Jul	Aug	Sep	Oct	Nov	Dec	Year
Mean daily maximum °F (°C)	65.3 (18.5)	66.6 (19.2)	72.4 (22.4)	80.6 (27.0)	89.2 (31.8)	99.6 (37.6)	101.9 (38.8)	100.3 (37.9)	96.9 (36.1)	86.7 (30.4)	73.6 (23.1)	65.9 (18.8)	83.3 (28.5)
Mean daily minimum °F (°C)	37.4 (3.0)	38.4 (3.6)	43.0 (6.1)	48.7 (9.3)	55.4 (13.0)	65.9 (18.8)	73.7 (23.2)	72.7 (22.6)	65.9 (18.8)	54.9 (12.7)	43.6 (6.4)	37.5 (3.1)	53.1 (11.7)
Average precipitation inches (mm)	1.31 (33)	0.86 (22)	1.05 (27)	0.58 (15)	0.18 (4.6)	0.16 (4.1)	1.55 (39)	1.77 (45)	0.89 (23)	0.75 (19)	0.81 (21)	1.29 (33)	11.18 (284)
Average snowfall inches (cm)	0.0 (0.0)	0.1 (0.25)	0.0 (0.0)	0.0 (0.0)	0.0 (0.0)	0.0 (0.0)	0.0 (0.0)	0.0 (0.0)	0.0 (0.0)	0.0 (0.0)	0.1 (0.25)	0.2 (0.51)	0.4 (1.0)
Average precipitation days (≥ 0.01 in)	4	3	3	2	1	1	5	6	2	2	3	3	37
Source: Western Regional Climate Center

== Demographics ==
Historical population
Census	Pop.	Note	%±
1980	1,589		—
1990	2,925		84.1%
2000	3,728		27.5%
2010	5,015		34.5%
2020	4,892		−2.5%
U.S. Decennial Census

=== Racial and ethnic composition ===
Cave Creek town, Arizona – Racial composition
Race (NH = Non-Hispanic)	2020	2010	2000	1990	1980
White alone (NH)	87% (4,258)	88.9% (4,456)	91.3% (3,404)	93.8% (2,745)	94.9% (1,508)
Black alone (NH)	0.3% (13)	0.6% (29)	0.3% (11)	0.2% (5)	0.3% (4)
American Indian alone (NH)	0.3% (13)	0.5% (24)	0.2% (7)	0.5% (15)	0.9% (15)
Asian alone (NH)	1.3% (64)	0.8% (39)	0.4% (15)	0.3% (8)	0.9% (15)
Pacific Islander alone (NH)	0.1% (5)	0.1% (3)	0% (1)	0.3% (8)	0.9% (15)
Other race alone (NH)	0.4% (22)	0.1% (5)	0% (1)	0% (0)	0.9% (15)
Multiracial (NH)	3.3% (160)	1% (51)	0.7% (26)	—	—
Hispanic/Latino (any race)	7.3% (357)	8.1% (408)	7.1% (263)	5.2% (152)	3.9% (62)

=== 2020 census ===
As of the 2020 census, Cave Creek had a population of 4,892. The median age was 59.8 years. 10.3% of residents were under the age of 18 and 36.9% of residents were 65 years of age or older. For every 100 females there were 96.2 males, and for every 100 females age 18 and over there were 94.9 males age 18 and over.

66.8% of residents lived in urban areas, while 33.2% lived in rural areas.

There were 2,279 households in Cave Creek, of which 16.3% had children under the age of 18 living in them. Of all households, 60.3% were married-couple households, 14.0% were households with a male householder and no spouse or partner present, and 20.0% were households with a female householder and no spouse or partner present. About 24.0% of all households were made up of individuals and 13.1% had someone living alone who was 65 years of age or older.

There were 2,739 housing units, of which 16.8% were vacant. The homeowner vacancy rate was 2.4% and the rental vacancy rate was 13.8%.

=== 2000 census ===
Out of the 1,571 households some 27.1% had children under the age of 18 living with them, 59.0% were married couples living together, 7.4% had a female householder with no husband present, and 29.9% were non-families. 24.3% of all households were made up of individuals, and 6.2% had someone living alone who was 65 years of age or older.

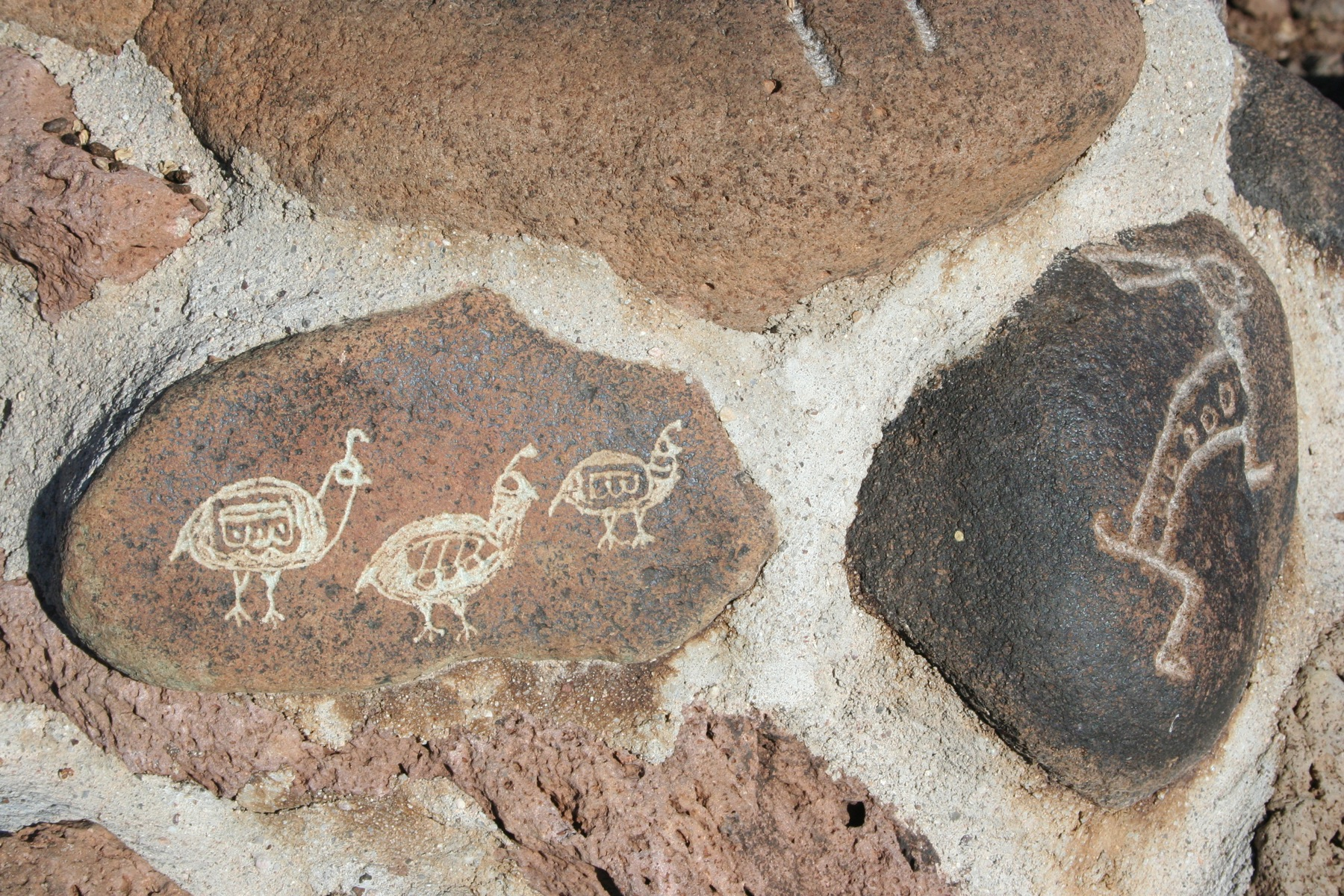
Trail markers at Spur Cross Park, north of Cave Creek

In the town, the population was spread out, with 20.9% under the age of 18, 5.5% from 18 to 24, 24.2% from 25 to 44, 36.1% from 45 to 64, and 13.3% who were 65 years of age or older. The median age was 45 years. For every 100 females, there were 100.1 males. For every 100 females age 18 and over, there were 97.5 males.

=== Income and poverty ===
The median income for a household in the town was $102,589, and the per capita income for the town was $63,573. About 8.9% of the population were below the poverty line, including 12.9% of those under age 18 and 7.3% of those age 65 or over.

== Arts and culture ==
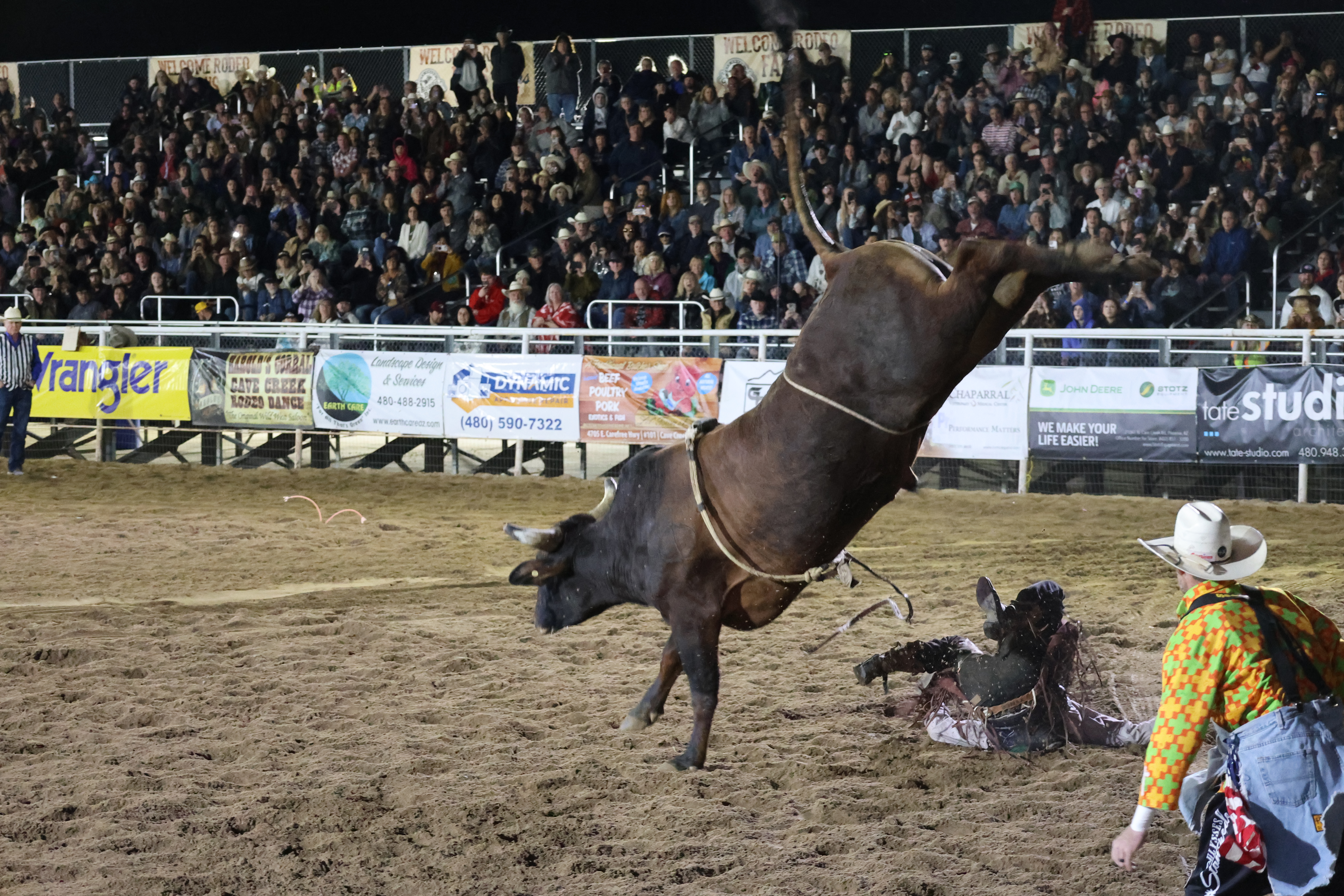
Cave Creek Rodeo Days

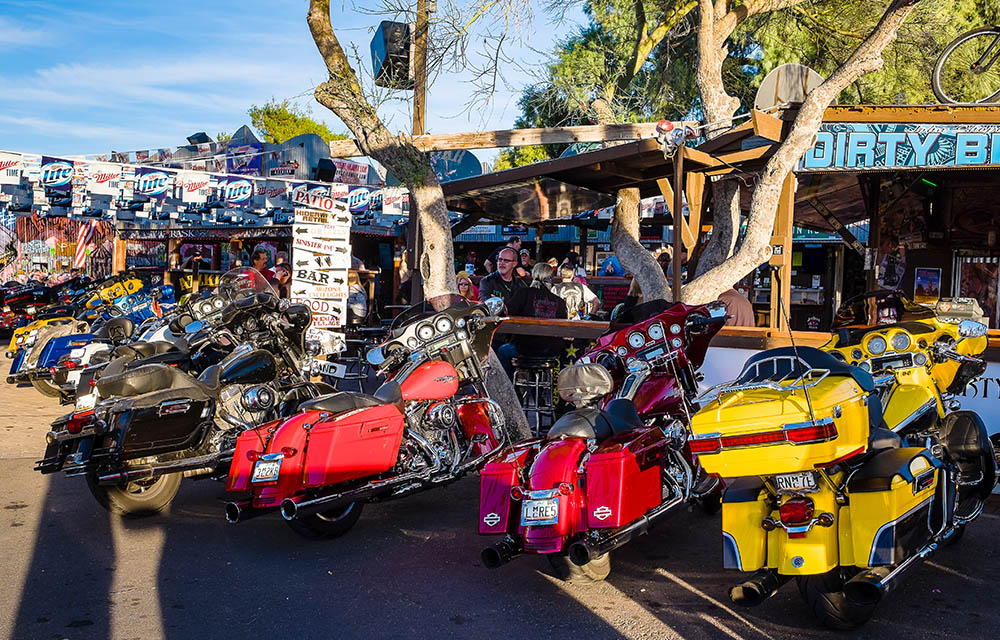
Bike Week each spring attracts hundreds of motorcycle enthusiasts to Cave Creek

Historic properties located at the Cave Creek Museum include the Tubercular Cabin (listed on the National Register of Historic Places (NRHP)), the First Church of Cave Creek, and Golden Reef Stamp Mill. Two historic properties have been converted into restaurants: the Cave Creek Inn, and the Cave Creek Service Station (listed on NRHP). Another location, Frontier Town, has some of Cave Creek's original structures.

== Government ==
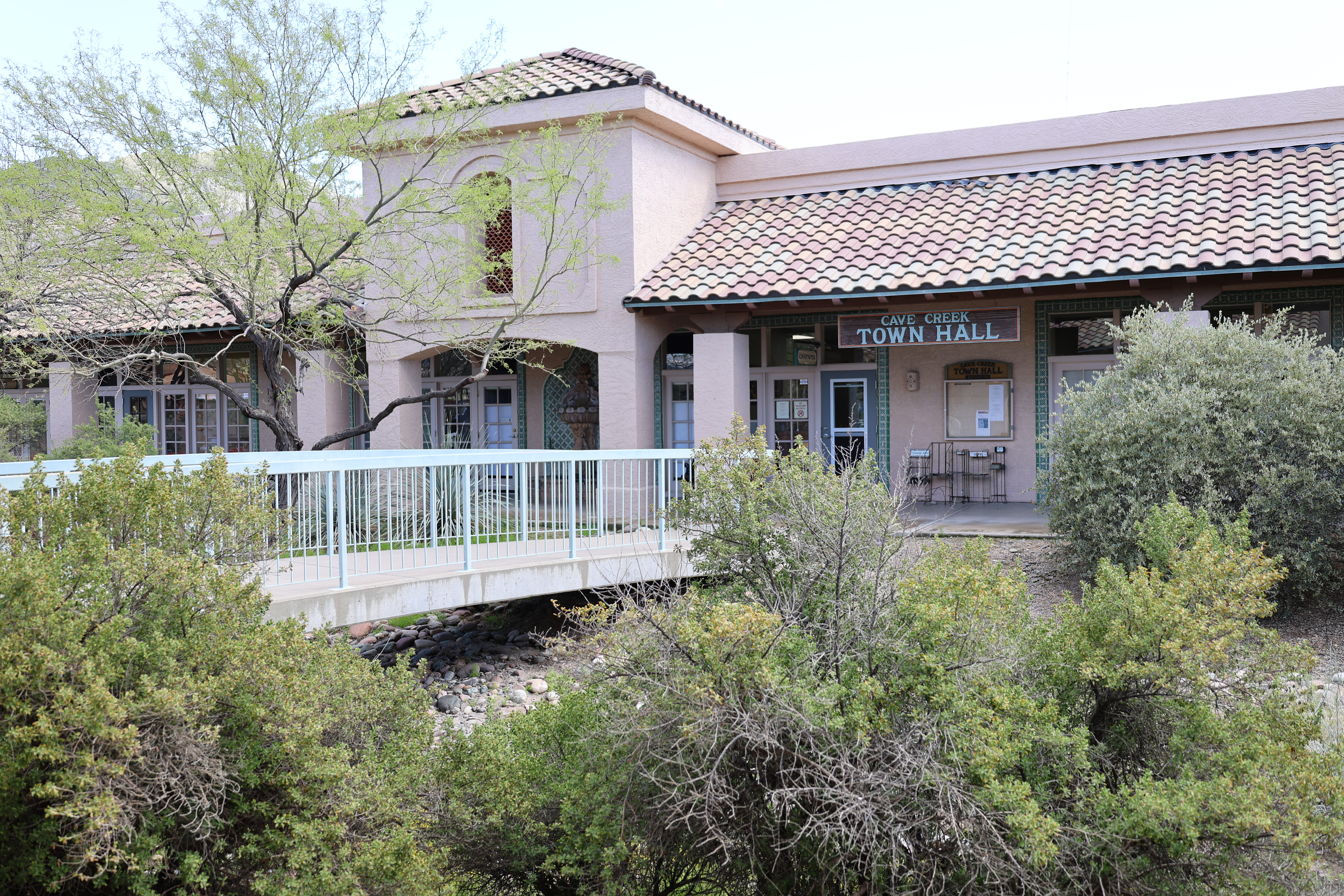
Cave Creek Town Hall

In June 2009, Cave Creek attracted media attention when a game of chance was used to break a tie in a vote for Town Council. The Arizona State Constitution allows a game of chance to be used to break ties.

"Where the Wild West Lives" was adopted as the town motto by the Cave Creek Town Council during a November 2013 meeting.

Cave Creek is a Council-Manager form of government; the town manager is Grady Miller. Town council is led by Mayor Robert Morris.

== Education ==
The portion of Cave Creek west of longitude 111°59'44.21"W is served by Deer Valley Unified School District, and the remainder of the town is served by Cave Creek Unified School District.

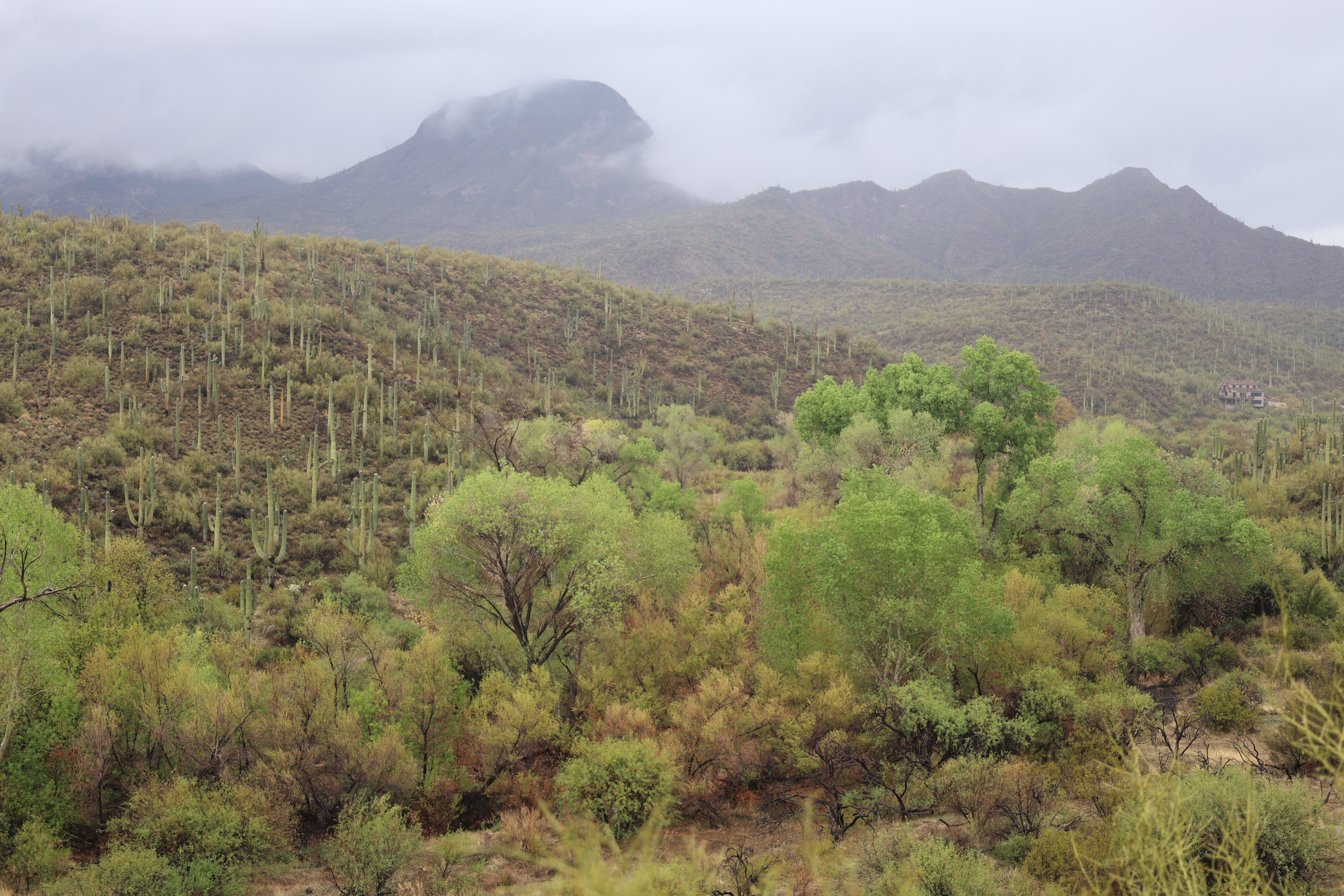
Spur Cross Ranch Conservation Area

== Infrastructure ==
=== Transportation ===
Cave Creek residents use Phoenix Sky Harbor International Airport or Mesa Gateway Airport to fly on commercial airlines. Deer Valley Airport, the closest airport to Cave Creek, is a very active general aviation airport.

Residents and visitors often rely on private ground transportation services, such as limousine and black car providers, for airport transfers and local travel given the lack of public transit. Cave Creek is not a member of Valley Metro and therefore, does not have local bus service.

The junction of Cave Creek Road and Carefree Highway is located at the south edge of Cave Creek.

== Notable people ==
- Sonny Barger, founder of the Oakland chapter of the Hells Angels
- Bob Boze Bell, publisher of True West Magazine
- Brian Dales, singer of The Summer Set
- Shane Doan, NHL player for the Arizona Coyotes
- Kiowa Gordon, actor
- David Henrie, actor
- Taylor Lewan, NFL player for the Tennessee Titans, drafted in 2014
- Daisy Mallory, country music singer-songwriter
- Earl Simmons, rapper and actor (DMX)
- Shannon Whirry, actress
- Dee Dee Wood, Emmy Award-winning choreographer
- Stephenie Meyer, author of the Twilight novels

== See also ==
- Cave Creek Complex Wildfire
- List of historic properties in Cave Creek, Arizona
- List of municipalities in Arizona
