= Phoenix Art Institute =

Art school in New York City

Location
- 350 Madison Avenue, New York, New York; United States; 40.755°N 73.981°W

Information
- Established: 1925
- Closed: 1944

Phoenix Art Institute, originally located at 350 Madison Avenue in New York, New York, was an educational institution co-founded in 1925 by Franklin Booth with Lauros M. Phoenix. In 1944, it merged with the New York School of Applied Design for Women, becoming the New York Phoenix School of Design. In 1974, the New York Phoenix School of Design merged with the Pratt Institute to form the Pratt-Phoenix School of Design

== Overview ==
Phoenix Art Institute taught traditional fine art, illustration, and commercial art. Phoenix was the president and an instructor. Booth taught at the school for 21 years and remained affiliated with the organization until his death in 1948. At some point he was vice-president and a trustee of the organization. Other teachers were Norman Rockwell, Walter Beach Humphrey, and Thomas Fogarty.

== Alumni ==
Walt Kelly (cartoonist) <Michael Barrier (November 27, 2014). Funnybooks: The Improbable Glories of the Best American Comic Books. Univ of California Press. pp. 36–37. ISBN 978-0-520-24118-3.>

- Warren King (cartoonist)
- Bob Montana
- John Cullen Murphy
- Walter Reed
- Bettina Steinke
- Kiyoshi Takahashi
- Frank Wright, Jr.

== Mergers ==
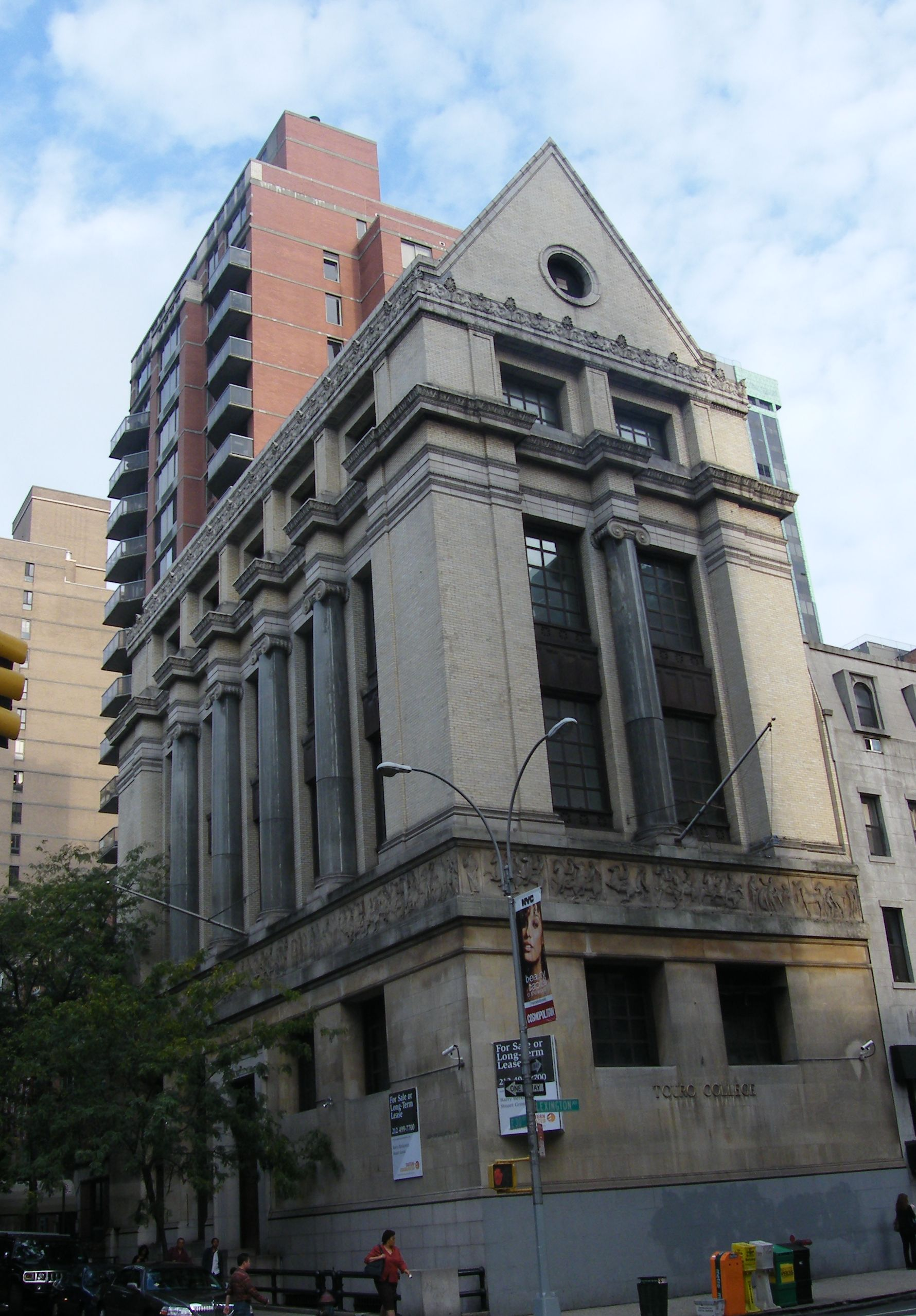
New York School of Applied Design Building, 160 Lexington Avenue, was built for the New York School of Applied Design for Women, and designated a New York City Landmark in 1977.

In 1944, The Phoenix Art Institute merged with the New York School of Applied Design for Women, which reincorporated as the co-educational New York Phoenix School of Design. In 1974, the New York Phoenix School of Design merged with the Pratt Institute to form the Pratt-Phoenix School of Design.
