= Bettina Steinke =

American painter and muralist (1913–1999)

- Born: June 25, 1913; Biddeford, Maine, U.S.
- Died: July 11, 1999 (aged 86)
- Education: Cooper Union Art Institute; Phoenix Art Institute
- Occupations: Artist, muralist
- Known for: Painting
- Spouse: Don Blair

Bettina Steinke (June 25, 1913 – July 11, 1999) was an American painter and muralist.

== Life ==
Steinke was born Biddeford, Maine. Her father was cartoonist and entertainer Jolly Bill Steinke. After graduating from Bridgeport High School, she studied at Cooper Union and the Phoenix Art School where she concentrated on portraiture.

In 1937 she received her first major commission, to create murals for the Children's Studio in the National Broadcasting Company. They were so successful that NBC then hired her as a resident artist to draw portraits of such stars as Fred Allen, Kate Smith and Rudy Vallee. This was followed by her drawing illustrations for a souvenir book of the NBC Symphony Orchestra that included over 100 of her sketches, including Arturo Toscanini.

In 1939 Steinke left NBC and was commissioned by ASCAP to draw portraits of some of its members including Jerome Kern. During World War II she painted portraits of Franklin D. Roosevelt, Douglas MacArthur and Dwight D. Eisenhower.

in 1946 she married photo-journalist Don Blair and they spent the next decade traveling the world during which time she produced work for Standard Oil and the Hudson's Bay Company. In 1956 the couple settled in Taos, New Mexico, moving to Santa Fe fifteen years later.

In 1995, the National Cowboy Hall of Fame hosted a major retrospective of Steinke’s career and she was honored with a Lifetime Achievement Award. In 1996, Steinke was awarded the John Singer Sargent Award for Lifetime Achievement by the Society of Portrait Artists." Her work can be found in the collections of the National Cowboy Hall of Fame and Western Heritage Center, Gilcrease Institute of American History and Art, Philbrook Museum of Art, and the Fort Worth Art Museum.
