= Daisy Mallory =

American musician

Daisy Mallory (born May 19, 1993) is a country music singer-songwriter based in Nashville, Tennessee.

== Early life ==
Daisy Mallory grew up in Cave Creek, Arizona. She started playing guitar and writing songs at the age of nine. She performed for the first time at age twelve, at a benefit concert for Hurricane Katrina victims held in her hometown.

When she was thirteen, Mallory attended Seth Riggs's Vocal Camp in Los Angeles. She successfully auditioned to take part in a master class, and got positive feedback from the judges after her performance. She began playing more shows in her area, and recorded her first EP in Phoenix, Arizona.

== Career ==
Mallory began making connections with songwriters in her local chapter of NSAI, as well as making frequent trips to Nashville. She also recorded her second EP, "Just Sayin,'" which was released in June of that year.

In May 2009, Mallory performed at her first showcase at The Rutledge in Nashville.

Her EP, "Girl Time," was released in early 2010. Its debut single, "Do You Think Of Me," was produced by Jeff Dayton, who has also worked with George Strait and Glen Campbell. The music video for "Do You Think of Me" was shot in March 2010. It has received placement on CMT.com and GACtv.com, and has appeared on Yallwire's Top 100 charts in September.

Her notable performances in the spring of 2010 include performing at Muhammad Ali's Celebrity Fight Night, alongside Reba McEntire, David Foster, and Kris Kristofferson, as well as singing the national anthem for a Phoenix Coyotes game.

In April 2010, Mallory and her family moved to Nashville to continue pursuing her career. In June, she was the first artist to be signed to new record label FrontWater Records. She continues to perform in local venues and promote her current single.

She has had her songs cut by artists Jess Moskaluke, Riana Nel, Kenny Foster, and more. In January 2017, Daisy began playing acoustic guitar and singing background vocals for country artist Lorrie Morgan.

== Selected discography ==
I'm Just Sayin' (2009)

1. Posin'
2. Didn't I
3. I Know You Don't
4. You Can't Stay
5. Daddy's Boots

Girl Time (January 5, 2010)

1. Girl Time
2. Do You Think Of Me?
3. Don't Grow Up Too Fast
4. When I Close My Eyes
5. You Should Know
6. Right Here

Merry Christmas (November 18, 2010)

1. Santa Baby
2. Mary Did You Know
3. I Believe in Him Too

Six String (December 13, 2011)

1. Over
2. Save Me
3. What About Us
4. Convince Me
5. It's Yours
6. Have A Nice Trip

This Side of Town (2014)

1. Never Ever Coming Down
2. I Remember Everything
3. Train
4. Music Inside Me
5. This Side of Town
6. Used to This

Music Videos

1. Do You Think Of Me?
2. Don't Grow Up Too Fast
