= Frank Wright Jr. =

Frank Boggs Wright Jr.
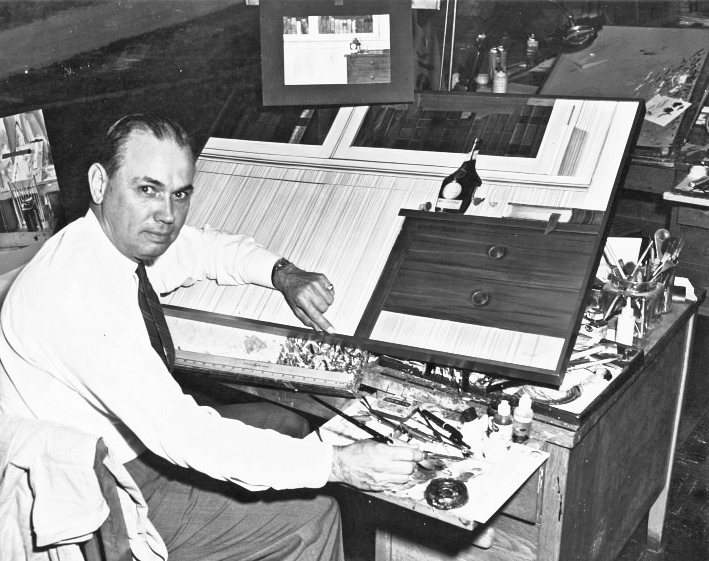
- Frank B. Wright Jr. and his work, "Rare Editions," an entry - and one of thirty-five finalists - in the 1969 Benedictine Art Awards contest.
- Born: November 18, 1912; Madison Heights, Virginia, U.S.
- Died: February 21, 2008 (aged 89)
- Known for: Graphic design

Frank Boggs Wright Jr. (18 November 1912 – 21 February 2008) was an American commercial artist whose career extended from the mid-1930s to the late 1990s. A native of Madison Heights, Virginia, he was perhaps best known for designing the ChapStick logo (circa 1936). A longtime resident of Lynchburg, Virginia he produced many logotypes and designs familiar to the area, including the current and two past City of Lynchburg logos and the Lynchburg Community Market banner. From 1944 through 1997, Wright's firm, Wright and Williams Studio (later Frank Wright Studio), produced a prodigious amount of commercial art work for local and national businesses, most notably the Craddock-Terry Shoe Corporation, Lane Furniture Company, and First Colony Life Insurance Company.

Wright studied at Lynchburg College and the Phoenix Art Institute (later the New York—Phoenix School of Design) in New York City. He was married for 62 years to Julia Alberta Hughes of Lynchburg and had four sons. He is buried in Fort Hill Memorial Park in Lynchburg.
