= List of museums in Arizona =

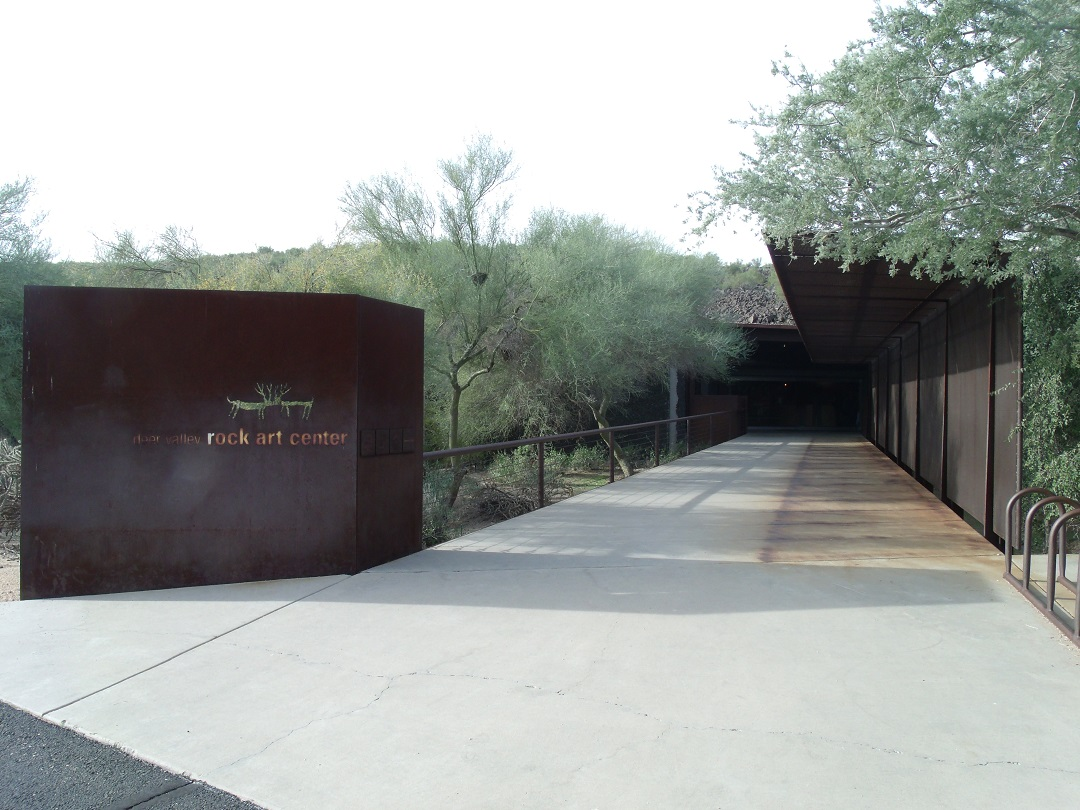
Deer Valley Rock Art Center Museum

This list of museums in Arizona encompasses museums which are defined for this context as institutions (including nonprofit organizations, government entities, and private businesses) that collect and care for objects of cultural, artistic, scientific, or historical interest and make their collections or related exhibits available for public viewing. Museums that exist only in cyberspace (i.e., virtual museums) are not included. The list also includes public non-profit art galleries, and national, state and local parks that feature visitor centers with exhibits.

== Museums ==
Name	Location	County	Region	Area of study	Website/Summary
Acadia Ranch Museum	Oracle	Pinal	Southern	History – Local	website, operated by the Oracle Historical Society, exhibits include local cattle ranch, health resort and mining histories, prehistoric artifacts
Adobe Mountain Desert Railroad Park	Glendale	Maricopa	Phoenix area	Railroad	Includes equipment, model railroad layout, photographs and memorabilia, miniature railway rides by the Maricopa Live Steamers; operated by the Sahuaro Central Railroad Heritage Preservation Society, located in Adobe Dam Regional Park
Ak-Chin Him-Dak Eco-Museum	Maricopa	Pinal	Phoenix area	Ethnic – Native American	Includes tribal crafts and history of the Ak-Chin Indian Community
Amerind Museum	Dragoon	Cochise	Southern	Ethnic – Native American	Native American archaeology, art, history and culture; Fulton-Hayden Memorial Art Gallery features paintings by 20th century Anglo and Native American artists
Apache County Historical Society Museum	St. Johns	Apache	Northeast	History – Local	website
Arizona Capitol Museum	Phoenix	Maricopa	Phoenix area	History	Arizona state history, heritage and culture
Arizona Copper Art Museum	Clarkdale	Yavapai	Central	Art	website
Arizona Doll & Toy Museum	Glendale	Maricopa	Phoenix area	Toy	Facebook site
Arizona Historical Foundation	Tempe	Maricopa	Phoenix area	History	website, located in the Hayden Library at Arizona State University, changing exhibits of historic documents, photographs and printed materials from its collections
Arizona Heritage Center	Tempe	Maricopa	Phoenix area	History – Local	Central Arizona’s history with special emphasis on the 20th Century
Arizona Historical Society Pioneer Museum	Flagstaff	Coconino	North Central	History – Local	Flagstaff and northern Arizona history
Arizona Historical Society Downtown History Museum	Tucson	Pima	Southern	History – Local	Exhibits include early Tucson businesses and home displays, including a drugstore, police and fire department, and a barbershop
Arizona History Museum	Tucson	Pima	Southern	History – Local	Operated by the Arizona Historical Society, southern Arizona history from Spanish colonial through territorial eras
Arizona Military Museum	Phoenix	Maricopa	Phoenix area	Military	website, located at Papago Park Military Reservation, operated by the Arizona National Guard Historical Society, Arizona's military history
Arizona Museum of Natural History	Mesa	Maricopa	Phoenix area	Natural history	Dinosaurs, Native Americans, ancient cultures of Mexico and the Hohokam, Mars
Arizona Railway Museum	Chandler	Maricopa	Phoenix area	Railroad	Closed in summer, collection railroad rolling stock and artifacts
Arizona Rangers Museum	Nogales	Santa Cruz	Southern	Military	website, history of the Arizona Rangers, located in the Historic 1904 Courthouse
Arizona Science Center	Phoenix	Maricopa	Phoenix area	Science	Located in Historic Heritage Square
Arizona-Sonora Desert Museum	Tucson	Pima	Southern	Natural history	Combined zoo, natural history museum and botanical garden, features plants, animals, minerals and fossils of the Sonoran Desert
Arizona State Museum	Tucson	Pima	Southern	Ethnic – Native American	Includes Southwest Indian pottery, artifacts, exhibits of religion and culture
Arizona State University Art Museum	Tempe	Maricopa	Phoenix area	Art	Contemporary art, new media, ceramics and other crafts, prints, art from Arizona and the Southwest and art of the Americas
Arizona Street Railway Museum	Phoenix	Maricopa	Phoenix area	Transportation	Restored trolley cars
Arizona Commemorative Air Force Museum	Mesa	Maricopa	Phoenix area	Aviation	website, aircraft include bombers, sub hunters, fighters, attackers, escorts, trainers, gliders, cargo, utility and other
Asarco Mineral Discovery Center	Sahuarita	Pima	Southern	Mining	website, Asarco copper mining, mining history of Arizona and the Western United States
ASU Galleries	Tempe	Maricopa	Phoenix area	Art	Operated by Arizona State University includes the Step Gallery, Northlight Gallery, Gallery 100, Harry Wood Gallery, Hispanic Research Center Art Gallery
ASU West ArtSpace	Glendale	Maricopa	Phoenix area	Art	Operated by Arizona State University, hosts a variety of interdisciplinary and experimental artistic works, from visual to performance and installation art
Barbara Anderson Girl Scout Museum	Phoenix	Maricopa	Phoenix area	Scouting	website, tours by appointment, Girl Scout uniforms, handbooks, photos and memorabilia from 1912 on
Benson Museum	Benson	Cochise	Southern	History – Local	website, operated by the San Pedro Valley Arts and Historical Society
Besh-Ba-Gowah Archaeological Park	Globe	Gila	North Central	Archaeology	Includes partially reconstructed Salado pueblo village with a museum displaying artifacts from excavations on the site
Bill and Judy Schaefer Sports Hall of Fame	Tempe	Maricopa	Phoenix area	Hall of fame – Sports	Arizona State University athletes, coaches, teams, memorabilia
Bird Cage Theatre	Tombstone	Cochise	Southern	History	1880s theater, saloon, gambling parlor and brothel
Bisbee Mining & Historical Museum	Bisbee	Cochise	Southern	Multiple	website, local history, copper mining
Bonelli House	Kingman	Mohave	West Coast	Historic house	Early 20th century period house, operated by the Mohave County Historical Society
Buckeye Valley Museum	Buckeye	Maricopa	Phoenix area	History – Local	
Bullion Plaza Cultural Center & Museum	Miami	Gila	North Central	History – Local	website
Butterfly Lodge Museum	Greer	Apache	Northeast	Historic house	website, 1913 hunting lodge cabin, home to author James Willard Schultz and artist son Hart Merriam Schultz
Camp Verde Historical Society Museum	Camp Verde	Yavapai	North Central	History – Local	information
Canyon de Chelly National Monument	Navajo Nation	Apache	Northeast	Archaeology	Ancient pueblo ruin and museum with artifacts
Casa Grande Ruins National Monument	Coolidge	Pinal	Phoenix area	Multiple	Includes ruins of multiple Hohokam structures built in the 13th century, visitor center exhibits about the Hohokam and artifacts
Casa Malpais	Springerville	Apache	Northeast	Archaeology	Ancient pueblo ruin and museum with artifacts
Castle Dome Mines Museum and Ghost Town	Castle Dome Landing	Yuma	West Coast	Open-air	Historic lead-mining town and museum
Cave Creek Museum	Cave Creek	Maricopa	Phoenix area	History – Local	website, exhibits include pioneers, mining, Hohokam artifacts
Center for Creative Photography	Tucson	Pima	Southern	Art	Part of the University of Arizona, photography
Center for Meteorite Studies	Tempe	Maricopa	Phoenix area	Geology	Part of Arizona State University, collection of meteorites on display
Chandler Center for the Arts	Chandler	Maricopa	Phoenix area	Art	Includes the Vision Gallery and art exhibits in the Exhibition Hall
Chandler Museum	Chandler	Maricopa	Phoenix area	History – Local	Located in the McCullough-Price House, changing exhibits on culture, history and art, also Tumbleweed Ranch featuring a 1917 home, a historic grocery store and farm equipment
Children's Museum of Phoenix	Phoenix	Maricopa	Phoenix area	Children's	website
Clarkdale Historical Society and Museum	Clarkdale	Yavapai	North Central	History – Local	website
Clemenceau Heritage Museum	Cottonwood	Yavapai	North Central	History – Local	Operated by the Verde Historical Society
Cocopah Museum and Cultural Center	Somerton	Yuma	Southwest	Native American	website, recognized federal repository, features objects and depictions of Cocopah history and culture
Colossal Cave Mountain Park	Vail	Pima	Southern	History / Geology	Includes La Posta Quemada Ranch Museum, Civilian Conservation Corps Museum
Copper Queen Mine	Bisbee	Cochise	Southern	Mining	Underground tours of the mine
Cowbelles Museum	Nogales	Santa Cruz	Southern	History	information, contributions of women in ranching, located in the Historic 1904 Courthouse
Cutler-Plotkin Jewish Heritage Center	Phoenix	Maricopa	Phoenix area	Jewish	Former synagogue, hosts changing exhibits of Jewish art, history and culture
Deer Valley Petroglyph Preserve	Phoenix	Maricopa	Phoenix area	Archaeology	Located in Deer Valley Road, part of Arizona State University, features Native American rock art and a petroglyph trail in the desert
DeGrazia Gallery in the Sun Historic District	Tucson	Pima	Southern	Art	Art gallery and artistic manifestation and architectural constructed of Ettore DeGrazia
Desert Caballeros Western Museum	Wickenburg	Maricopa	Phoenix area	American West	website, includes Western art, cowboy, pioneer and Native American artifacts, gems and minerals, period store and home displays, history dioramas
Dinnerware Artspace	Tucson	Pima	Southern	Art	Contemporary art gallery
Discovery Park Campus	Safford	Graham	Southeast	Science	website, part of Eastern Arizona College, includes an observatory, exhibits about space, the Solar System and astronomy
Fort Apache Historic Park	Fort Apache	Navajo	Northeast	Native American	Includes cultural center, museum, walking tour of the historic district and nearby Kinishba Ruins
Fort Bowie National Historic Site	Bowie	Cochise	Southern	Military	Includes ruins of Fort Bowie, visitor center exhibits about the fort and the conflict between the Chiricahua Apache and the U.S. military
Fort Grant Historical Museum	Willcox	Graham	Southeast	Military	History of the former 19th-century fort and current prison
Fort Huachuca Museum	Fort Huachuca	Cochise	Southern	Military	History of the US Army in the Southwest, located at Fort Huachuca
Fort Lowell Museum	Tucson	Pima	Southern	Military	Operated by the Arizona Historical Society, military life on the Arizona frontier
Fort Verde State Historic Park	Camp Verde	Yavapai	North Central	Multiple	Includes three 1880s period historic house museums, exhibits about the fort, military life, Indian Scouts and Indian Wars era
Fort Whipple Museum	Prescott	Yavapai	North Central	Medical	Medical and military artifacts of the fort and military hospital
Fred Lawrence Whipple Observatory	Amado	Santa Cruz	Southern	Science	Visitor center exhibits about astronomy and astrophysics, natural science, and cultural history, tours of the observatory
Gadsden-Pacific Division Toy Train Operating Museum	Tucson	Pima	Southern	Railroad	website, model train layouts and equipment
Gilbert Historical Museum	Gilbert	Maricopa	Phoenix area	History – Local	website
Gleeson Jail	Gleeson	Cochise	Southern	Prison	Restored early 20th-century jail
Glendale Police Museum	Glendale	Maricopa	Phoenix area	Law enforcement	website, located in the City of Glendale Public Safety Building lobby
Grace Museum of America	Cave Creek	Maricopa	Phoenix area	History	Open by appointment only, America's transition from pioneer to modern life
Grand Canyon National Park	Grand Canyon Village	Coconino	North Central	Multiple	Includes changing art exhibits in the Kolb Studio, pioneer history exhibits at the Verkamp's Visitor Center, geology exhibits at the Yavapai Observation Station, Native American exhibits at the Tusayan Ruins and Museum
Hall of Flame Fire Museum	Phoenix	Maricopa	Phoenix area	Firefighting	Firefighting equipment, apparatus, patches, helmets, uniforms, memorabilia
Heard Museum	Phoenix	Maricopa	Phoenix area	Ethnic – Native American	Ancient and contemporary Native American jewelry, baskets, kachina dolls, ceramics, clothing and art
Henry Hauser Museum	Sierra Vista	Cochise	Southern	History – Local	website, operated by the Sierra Vista Historical Society
Hilltop Gallery	Nogales	Santa Cruz	Southern	Art	website, community art gallery
Historic Fairbank Schoolhouse	Fairbank	Cochise	Southern	School	Restored one room schoolhouse, exhibits about the ghost town
Historic Route 66 Museum	Kingman	Mohave	West Coast	Transportation	Evolution of travel along the 35th parallel that became Route 66, located in a restored power plant
History of Pharmacy Museum	Tucson	Pima	Southern	Medical	website, part of the University of Arizona College of Pharmacy, includes bottles, original drug containers, drug store fixtures and historic artifacts
Homolovi State Park	Winslow	Navajo	Northeast	Archaeology	Artifacts from over 300 Ancestral Puebloan archaeological sites
Hubbell Trading Post National Historic Site	Ganado	Apache	Northeast	Historic house	Historic trading post and family homestead with barn, bunkhouse, guest hogan, historic farm equipment and animals
Huhugam Heritage Center	Chandler	Maricopa	Phoenix area	Ethnic – Native American	website, history and culture of the Gila River Indian Community
Huhugam Ki Museum	Scottsdale	Maricopa	Phoenix area	Ethnic – Native American	website, history and culture of the O'odham (Pima) and Piipaash (Maricopa)
I.d.e.a. Museum	Mesa	Maricopa	Phoenix area	Children's	Focus is on fine art and creativity, formerly the Arizona Museum for Youth
Innovation Gallery	Tempe	Maricopa	Phoenix area	Anthropology	Part of Arizona State University, changing exhibits of culture, part of the ASU Center for Archaeology and Society, formerly the ASU Museum of Anthropology
International Wildlife Museum	Tucson	Pima	Southern	Natural history	website, dioramas of insects, mammals and bird from around the world
Jerome State Historic Park	Jerome	Yavapai	North Central	History – Local	Exhibits include local history and copper mining
Jewish History Museum	Tucson	Pima	Southern	Jewish	Houses in a historic synagogue, history of the Jewish community in Arizona
John Bell Railroad Museum	Clarkdale	Yavapai	North Central	Railroad	Located in the depot of the Verde Canyon Railroad, a heritage railroad
John S. McCain III Library and Museum	Tempe	Maricopa	Central	History — Political	Planned museum from the McCain Institute and Arizona State University honoring the legacy of former Arizona senator John McCain.
Kannally Ranch House	Oracle	Pinal	Southern Arizona	Historic house	Part of Oracle State Park, 1930s adobe ranch home
Kitt Peak National Observatory	Tohono O'odham Indian Reservation	Pima	Southern	Science	Astronomy
Lake Havasu Museum of History	Lake Havasu City	Mohave	West Coast	History – Local	website
La Pilita Museum	Tucson	Pima	Southern	History – Local	website
Lauridsen Aviation Museum	Buckeye Airfield	Maricopa	Phoenix area	Aviation	Vintage and World War II aircraft
L. Ron Hubbard House at Camelback	Phoenix	Maricopa	Phoenix area	Biographical	website, house where L. Ron Hubbard developed the theories of Scientology
Martin Auto Museum	Phoenix	Maricopa	Phoenix area	Automobile	website, numerous historic automobiles, 100+ years worth of automobile history
Maynard Dixon Museum	Tucson	Pima	Southern	Art	website, works by artist Maynard Dixon, including original oils, watercolors, drawings and poetry
Manistee Ranch	Glendale	Maricopa	Phoenix area	Historic house	Operated by the Glendale Arizona Historical Society
McCormick-Stillman Railroad Park	Scottsdale	Maricopa	Phoenix area	Railroad	Includes a 15" gauge railroad, a Magma Arizona Railroad locomotive, a railroad museum, three model railroad clubs and a 7.5" gauge live steam railroad
McFarland State Historic Park	Florence	Pinal	Phoenix area	History	Historic courthouse and jail, exhibits about Arizona's Territorial history and law and order
Mesa Arts Center	Mesa	Maricopa	Phoenix area	Art	Includes Mesa Contemporary Arts, which houses five art galleries
Mesa Historical Museum	Mesa	Maricopa	Phoenix area	History – Local	Operated by the Mesa Historical Society, exhibits primarily on Mesa history and Spring Training in Arizona, housed in a historic 1913 school building
Meteor Crater	Winslow	Coconino	Northeast	Natural history	Visitor center exhibits about space, meteorites and asteroids, the solar system, and the Shoemaker-Levy 9 comet
Mills Collection	Thatcher	Graham	Southeast	Archaeology	website, part of Eastern Arizona College, collection of ancient Native American pottery, arrowheads, jewelry and artifacts on public display
Mine Museum	Jerome	Yavapai	North Central	History – Local	website, operated by the Jerome Historical Society
Mini Time Machine	Tucson	Pima	Southern	Doll	website, over 300 antique and contemporary dollhouses and roomboxes
Modified Arts	Phoenix	Maricopa	Phoenix area	Art	Contemporary art gallery, music venue and performance space
Mohave Museum of History and Arts	Kingman	Mohave	West Coast	History – Local	website, also changing exhibits of local art, collections online
Montezuma Castle National Monument	Camp Verde	Yavapai	North Central	Ethnic – Native American	Preserved cliff dwellings built by the pre-Columbian Sinagua people around 700 AD and a museum about the builders
Muheim Heritage House Museum	Bisbee	Cochise	Southern	Historic house	website, operated by the Bisbee Mining and Historical Museum, early 20th century period home
Museum of Casa Grande	Casa Grande	Pinal	Phoenix area	Multiple	website, complex includes local history museum with exhibits of railroads, agriculture, mining, a schoolhouse, a stone church, a barn and vintage fire engines, operated by the Casa Grande Valley Historical Society
Museum of Contemporary Art, Tucson	Tucson	Pima	Southern	Art	
Museum of Northern Arizona	Flagstaff	Coconino	North Central	Ethnic – Native American	Also natural history displays
Museum of the Horse Soldier	Tucson	Pima	Southern	Military – United States	Museum dedicated to the United States Horse Mounted Services
Musical Instrument Museum	Phoenix	Maricopa	Phoenix area	Music	Musical instruments from around the world
Mystery Castle	Phoenix	Maricopa	Phoenix area	Historic house	1930s 18-room, three story castle
Navajo County Historical Society Museum	Holbrook	Navajo	Northeast	History – Local	website, located in the former county courthouse
Navajo Interactive Museum	Tuba City	Coconino	North Central	Ethnic – Native American	website
Navajo Nation Museum	Window Rock	Apache	Northeast	Ethnic – Native American	History and culture of the Navajo Nation
Navajo National Monument		Navajo	Northeast	Ethnic – Native American	Three intact cliff dwellings of the Ancestral Puebloan people
Old Gila County Jail	Globe	Gila	North Central	Prison	Historic jail
Old Trails Museum	Winslow	Navajo	Northeast	History – Local	website, operated by the Winslow Historical Society
Petersen House Museum	Tempe	Maricopa	Phoenix area	Historic house	Late 19th century Victorian period house
Petrified Forest National Park		Navajo	Northeast	Natural history	Includes dinosaur and fossil exhibits in the Rainbow Forest Museum, and exhibits in the Painted Desert Inn Museum
Phippen Museum	Prescott	Yavapai	North Central	Art	website, American Western art including works by George Phippen and Solon Borglum
Phoenix Airport Museum	Phoenix	Maricopa	Phoenix area	Art	website, includes permanent pieces and changing exhibits in the terminals of Phoenix Sky Harbor International Airport
Phoenix Art Museum	Phoenix	Maricopa	Phoenix area	Art	Collection includes American, Asian, European, Latin American, Western American, modern and contemporary art, and fashion design
Phoenix Police Museum	Phoenix	Maricopa	Phoenix area	Law enforcement	website
Pima Air & Space Museum	Tucson	Pima	Southern	Aerospace	Includes over 275 commercial and military aircraft and spacecraft
Pima County Sports Hall of Fame	Tucson	Pima	Southern	Hall of fame – Sports	website, Arizona sports history
Pinal Geology and Mineral Museum	Coolidge	Pinal	Phoenix area	Geology	website, worldwide collection featuring Arizona and Pinal County geology
Pine-Strawberry Museum	Pine	Gila	North Central	History – Local	website, includes prehistoric and pioneer artifacts, period antiques and room displays
Pinetop-Lakeside Historical Society Museum	Pinetop-Lakeside	Navajo	Northeast	History – Local	website
Pioneer Living History Museum	Phoenix	Maricopa	Phoenix area	Living history	19th century Old West town
Pimeria Alta Historical Society and Museum	Nogales	Santa Cruz	Southern	History – local	website, located in the Historic 1904 Courthouse
Pipe Spring National Monument	Kaibab	Mohave	North Central	Multiple	Includes exhibits about the Kaibab Paiute Indians, Mormons, pioneer, natural history, historic fort tours
Planes of Fame	Valle	Coconino	North Central	Aerospace	Features rare and one-of-a-kind classic aircraft
Postal History Foundation	Tucson	Pima	Southern	Philatelic	website, includes turn-of-the-century frontier post office and postal exhibits
Powell Museum	Page	Coconino	North Central	History – Local	website, includes exhibits on explorations of John Wesley Powell
Pueblo Grande Museum Archaeological Park	Phoenix	Maricopa	Phoenix area	Archaeology	1,500-year-old Hohokam village ruins and excavated artifacts
Rex Allen Arizona Cowboy Museum and Willcox Cowboy Hall of Fame	Willcox	Cochise	Southern	Biographical	Memorabilia of Western actor and singer Rex Allen
Rim Country Museum	Payson	Gila	North Central	History – Local	website, operated by the Northern Gila County Historical Society, complex includes museum and Zane Grey cabin
Riordan Mansion State Historic Park	Flagstaff	Coconino	North Central	Historic house	1904 Arts and Crafts style mansion
River of Time Museum	Fountain Hills	Maricopa	Phoenix area	Multiple	website, Yavapai culture, archaeology, geology, mining, pioneers, Fort McDowell, Roosevelt Dam
Rosson House	Phoenix	Maricopa	Phoenix area	Historic house	Victorian period house, located in Historic Heritage Square
Sahuaro Ranch Park Historical Area	Glendale	Maricopa	Phoenix area	Farm	Late 19th century fruit ranch with 13 original buildings, a rose garden, barnyard and orchards
Sanguinetti House Museum	Yuma	Yuma	West Coast	History – Local	website. operated by the Arizona Historical Society, history of the Lower Colorado River from the 1540s to the present
Scottsdale Historical Museum	Scottsdale	Maricopa	Phoenix area	History – local	website, prehistory, history, and cultural heritage of Scottsdale and the Southwest
Scottsdale Museum of Contemporary Art	Scottsdale	Maricopa	Phoenix area	Art	Contemporary and modern art, architecture, and design
Sedona Heritage Museum	Sedona	Yavapai	North Central	History – Local	website
Sharlot Hall Museum	Prescott	Yavapai	North Central	Open-air	Includes several 19th-century period buildings and homes and a history museum
Shemer Art Center	Phoenix	Maricopa	Phoenix area	Art	Arts education center and contemporary arts museum of Arizona art
Show Low Museum	Show Low	Navajo	Northeast	History – Local	website, operated by the Show Low Historical Society
Sirrine House	Mesa	Maricopa	Phoenix area	Historic house	website, 1896 Victorian period house, open for special events
Slaughter Ranch	Douglas	Cochise	Southern	Historic house	Complex includes adobe ranch house, ice house, wash house, granary, commissary, and car shed
Smoki Museum	Prescott	Yavapai	North Central	Ethnic – Native American	Artifacts, art and culture of the indigenous cultures of the Southwest
Sosa-Carrillo-Fremont House	Tucson	Pima	Southern	Historic house	Late 19th-century adobe house, open by appointment the Arizona Historical Society
Southern Arizona Transportation Museum	Tucson	Pima	Southern	Railroad	Located in a depot, includes a steam locomotive, railroad and Arizona transportation history exhibits
Southwest Museum of Engineering, Communications and Computation	Glendale	Maricopa	Phoenix area	Technology	website, mostly a research facility, call before visiting, technological devices related to communications and computation
St. Michaels Museum	St. Michaels	Apache	Northeast	Ethnic – Native American	Navajo culture of the early 20th century, located in the 1898 St. Michaels Mission of Francison Friars
Stinson Pioneer Museum	Snowflake	Navajo	Northeast	History – Local	information
Sunnyslope Historical Society Museum	Phoenix	Maricopa	Phoenix area	History – Local	website
Superstition Mountain Museum	Apache Junction	Maricopa	Phoenix area	Multiple	website, complex includes reproductions of 19th century businesses, mining, area rock specimens, displays about area natural history, Native American, and military history.
Sylvia Plotkin Judaica Museum	Scottsdale	Maricopa	Phoenix area	Jewish	website, Jewish culture, history and art, operated by Congregation Beth Israel
Taliesin West	Scottsdale	Maricopa	Phoenix area	Historic house	Architect Frank Lloyd Wright's winter home and school
Taylor Pioneer Museum	Taylor	Navajo	Northeast	History – Local	information, information
Tempe Center for the Arts	Tempe	Maricopa	Phoenix area	Art	Includes the Gallery at TCA, a free public visual art gallery
Tempe History Museum	Tempe	Maricopa	Phoenix area	History – Local	website, city history, community art gallery
Titan Missile Museum	Sahuarita	Pima	Southern	Military	Former ICBM missile site and missile exhibits
Tohono Chul	Casas Adobes	Pima	Southern	Natural history	Botanical garden with collections of the Sonoran Desert and changing art exhibits illustrating the connections between nature, art and culture in the Southwest
Tohono O'odham Nation Cultural Center & Museum	Tohono O'odham Indian Reservation	Pima	Southern	Ethnic – Native American	information, history and culture of the Tohono O'odham
Tombstone Courthouse State Historic Park	Tombstone	Cochise	Southern	History	Restored 1880s courthouse
Tonto National Monument		Gila	North Central	Ethnic – Native American	Includes 13th to 15th century Salado culture cliff dwellings and visitor center museum
Tovrea Castle	Phoenix	Maricopa	Phoenix area	Historic house	Rococo-style 3-story building in a city park that features cacti
Trail Dust Town	Tucson	Pima	Southern	Multiple	Includes the Museum of the Horse Soldier, Trail Dust Town Railroad
Tubac Center for the Arts	Tubac	Santa Cruz	Southern	Art	website, includes exhibit gallery
Tubac Presidio State Historic Park	Tubac	Santa Cruz	Southern	History	Includes ruins of the Tubac Presidio, furnished 1885 schoolhouse, museum about the area's historic periods
Tucson Desert Art Museum	Tucson	Pima	Southern	Art/History	website, The Museum has one of the Southwest’s premier collections of Navajo and Hopi pre-1940s textiles and a diverse range of historical artifacts, classic and contemporary Southwestern paintings
Tucson Gay Museum	Tucson	Pima	Arizona	Gay Lesbian LGBTQ+ History	All Virtual
Tucson Museum of Art	Tucson	Pima	Southern	Art	Collection includes art of American West, the Americas, modern and contemporary art
Tucson Rodeo Parade Museum	Tucson	Pima	Southern	History	website, includes cowboy gear, rodeo memorabilia, horse-drawn vehicles
Tumacácori National Historical Park	Nogales	Santa Cruz	Southern	History	Ruins of three Spanish mission communities and a museum, consists of 360 acres (1.5 km2) in three separate units
Tuzigoot National Monument	Clarkdale	Yavapai	North Central	Archaeology	Pueblo ruins and visitor center museum
Tyson's Well Stage Station Museum	Quartzsite	La Paz	West Coast	History – Local	website, operated by the Quartzsite Historical Society, includes history and equipment for mining for gold, lead and mercury, minerals
University of Arizona Mineral Museum	Tucson	Pima	Southern	Geology	Minerals, meteorites, mining
University of Arizona Museum of Art	Tucson	Pima	Southern	Art	Emphasis on European and American fine art from the Renaissance to the present
University of Arizona Poetry Center	Tucson	Pima	Southern	Literary	Exhibits from its collections in Contemporary American poetry from the 1950s to the present, collection also includes rare books, limited-edition and artist books, chapbooks, broadsides, photographs, and audiovisual recordings
US Army Intelligence Museum	Fort Huachuca	Cochise	Southern	Military	Evolution of the intelligence art within the U.S. Army, located at Fort Huachuca
Verde Valley Archaeology Center	Camp Verde	Yavapai	Central	Archaeology	website
Walnut Canyon National Monument	Flagstaff	Coconino	North Central	Archaeology	Includes cliff dwelling rooms constructed by the Sinagua people and visitor center museum
Wupatki National Monument	Flagstaff	Coconino	North Central	Ethnic – Native American	Includes Ancient Pueblo People ruins and visitor center museum
Wells Fargo Museum	Phoenix	Maricopa	Phoenix area	History	American West history and the Wells Fargo Company, includes a 19th-century stagecoach, art gallery of N.C. Wyeth's western-themed work
Wellton Museum	Wellton	Yuma	Southwest	History – Local	Details the history of Wellton. Paintings, dolls, old cars, Native-related and agriculture-related items are found here.
Western Spirit: Scottsdale’s Museum of the West	Scottsdale	Maricopa	Phoenix area	History	Art, culture and history of 19 states in the American West
White Mountain Apache Cultural Center & Museum	Whiteriver	Navajo	Northeast	Ethnic – Native American	website, history and culture of the Apache, located in Fort Apache Indian Reservation
World's Smallest Museum	Superior	Pinal	Phoenix area	History	Includes antique household items, tools, movie equipment, mining artifacts, political memorabilia
Yuma Quartermaster Depot State Historic Park	Yuma	Yuma	West Coast	Military	Former United States Army logistics facility
Yuma Territorial Prison	Yuma	Yuma	West Coast	Prison	Historic prison

== Defunct museums ==
- American Museum of Nursing, Tempe
- Arizona Mining and Mineral Museum, Phoenix, closed in 2011
- Bead Museum, Glendale, closed in 2011, collections donated to the Mingei International Museum in San Diego, California
- Champlin Fighter Museum, Mesa, closed in 2003, collections now at Museum of Flight in Tukwila, Washington
- Fleisher Museum, Scottsdale, closed in 2002
- Graham County Historical Society Museum, Thatcher, Facebook site, closed in 2012 when building torn down, seeking new location
- Halle Heart Children's Museum, Tempe
- Heard Museum North, Scottsdale, closed in 2014
- Heard Museum West, Surprise, closed in 2009
- Peoria Arizona Historical Society Museum, also known as Peoria Central School Museum, closed in 2017 due to a dispute over control.
- Phoenix Museum of History, Phoenix, closed in 2009
- West Valley Art Museum, Surprise, building closed in 2009 but hosting exhibits in Peoria, website

== See also ==
- Nature Centers in Arizona
