= Trustrim Connell =

American soldier (1844–1937)

- Born: May 12, 1844; Lancaster, Pennsylvania
- Died: March 17, 1937 (aged 92); Los Angeles, California
- Burial place: Angelus-Rosedale Cemetery
- Military career
- Allegiance: United States of America
- Branch: United States Army
- Rank: Corporal
- Unit: 138th Regiment, Pennsylvania Volunteer Infantry - Company I
- Conflicts: Battle of Sayler's Creek
- Awards: Medal of Honor

Corporal Trustrim Connell (May 12, 1844 to February 17, 1937) was an American soldier who fought in the American Civil War. Connell received the country's highest award for bravery during combat, the Medal of Honor, for his action during the Battle of Sayler's Creek in Virginia on 6 April 1865. He was honored with the award on 10 May 1865.

== Biography ==
Connell was born in Lancaster, Pennsylvania, on 12 May 1844. He enlisted into the 138th Pennsylvania Infantry. He died on 17 February 1937, and his remains are interred at the Angelus-Rosedale Cemetery in Los Angeles.

== Medal of Honor citation ==
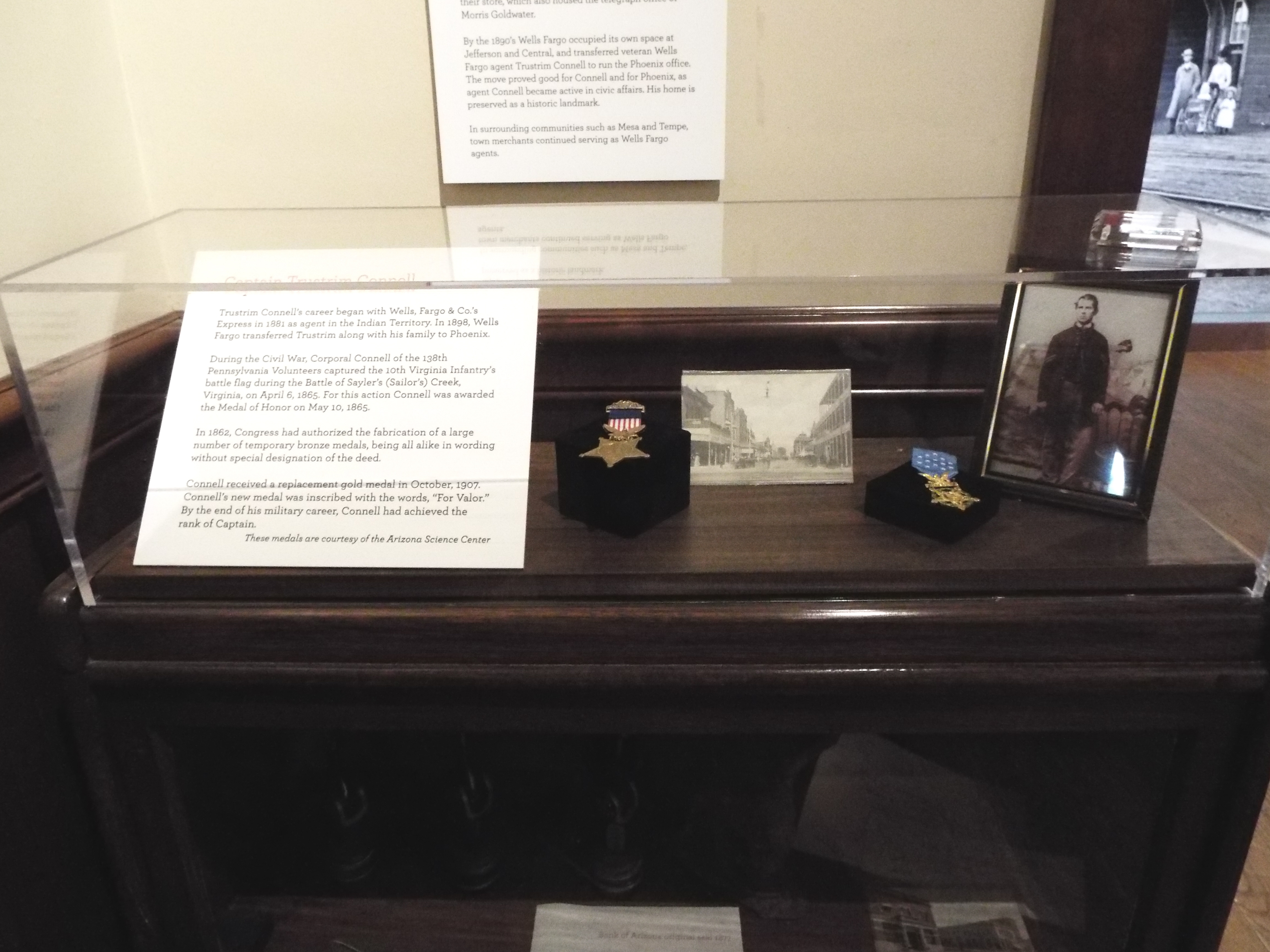
Medal of Honor display dedicated to Trustrim Connell in the Wells Fargo Museum in Phoenix, Arizona.

Capture of enemy flag.

== See also ==
- List of American Civil War Medal of Honor recipients: A–F
