= Phoenix Police Museum =

Museum in Arizona

Coordinates: 33.4475°N 112.0763°W

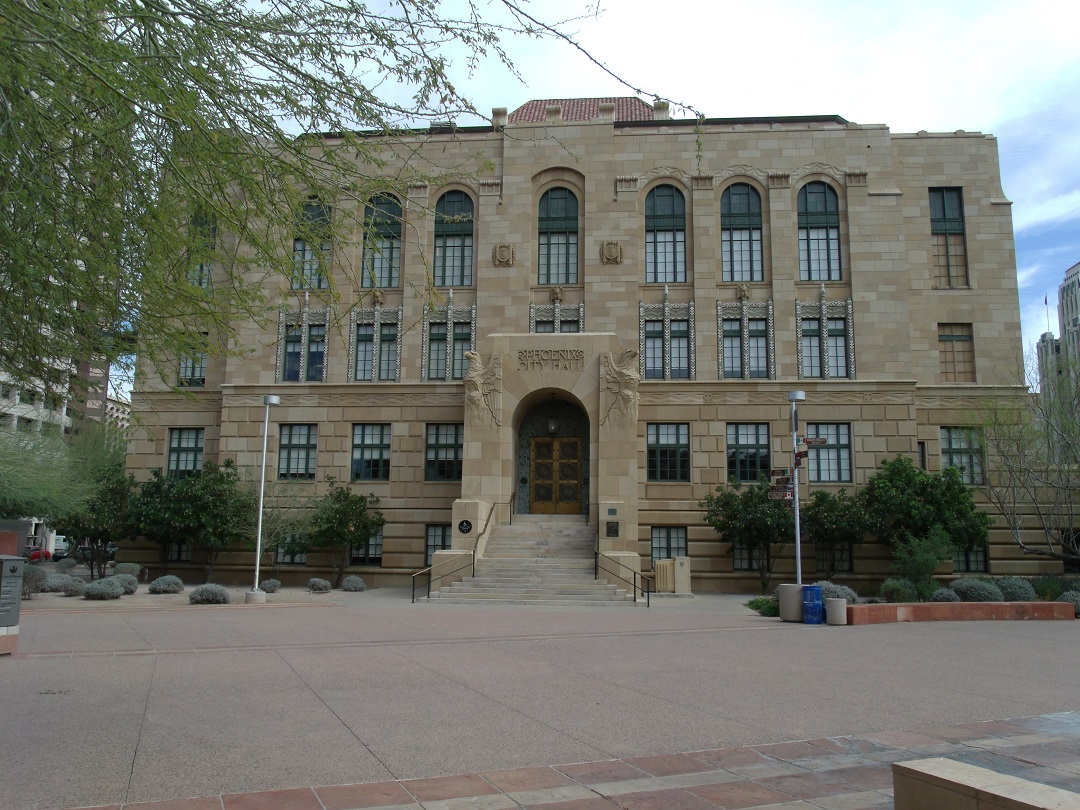
- Historic Old Phoenix City Hall, the location of the museum
- Established: 1995
- Location: 2nd Ave & Jefferson Street; Phoenix, Arizona
- Website: http://phoenixpolicemuseum.org/

The Phoenix Police Museum is located on 2nd Avenue and Jefferson Street, on the 1st floor of the Historic Phoenix City Hall. The museum highlights the history of the Phoenix Police Department from 1881, when Henry Garfias, was elected the first city marshal to the present. The museum also has an exhibit which explains the connection between the Phoenix Police and the "Miranda Rights". There are various educational exhibits in the museum some of which the community can participate and have an interactive experience.

== History ==
In October 1993, a temporary six-month display of the history of the Phoenix Police was created and exhibited at the Historic Phoenix City Hall located at 17 S. Second Ave.. The response of the public to the exhibit was favorable.

A petition was made by various organizations, such as the Phoenix Law Enforcement Association, to the Arizona Humanities Council to help fund a study of police-related artifacts. The study proved that there was enough material in existence to open a small museum. Volunteers, with the help of the donations from local companies, worked on the museum project. Finally, on October 6, 1995, the Phoenix Police Museum opened its doors in the old Barrister Place. The Old Barrister Place was once known as the Old Jefferson Hotel, and is located at 101 S. Central Ave.

In 2012, the museum moved to its current location at the Historic Phoenix City Hall. It so happens that the location was actually the home of the Phoenix Police Department from 1928 until 1975. The staff and those in charge of the museum are made up of volunteers who are former Phoenix Police officers and civilian personnel.

== Exhibits ==
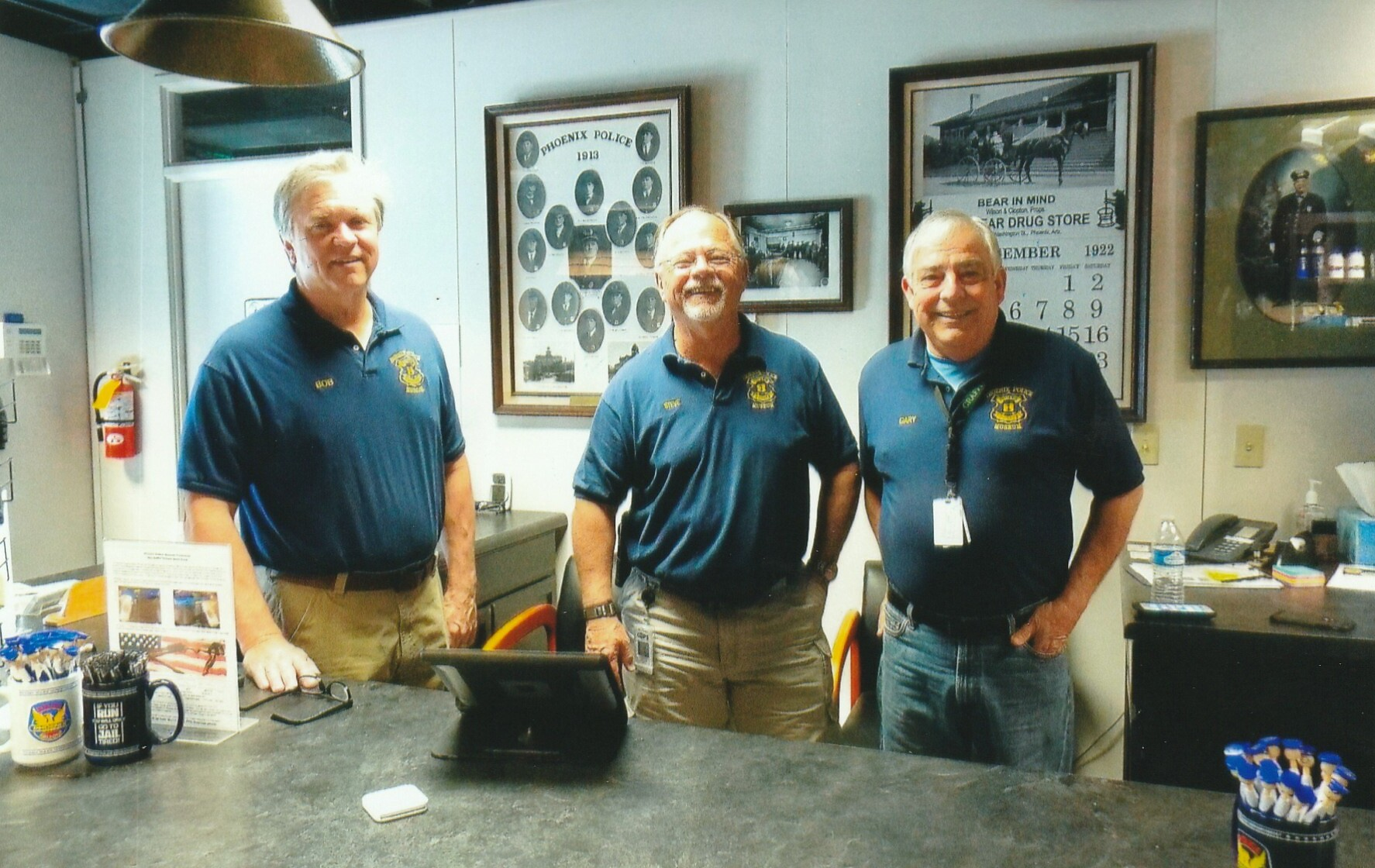
Museum volunteer staff

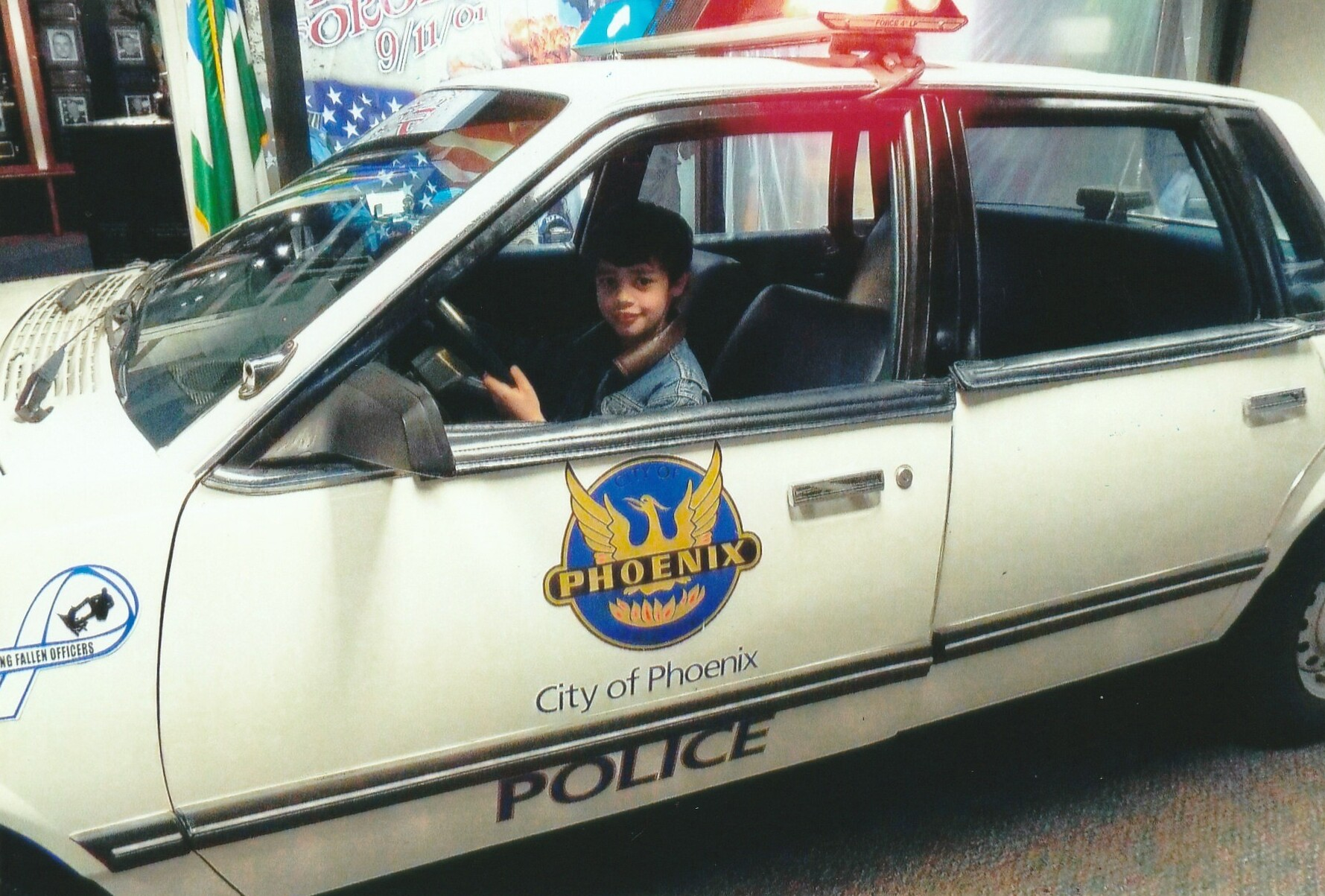
Child interacting in a Police Cruiser

The following is a small list of some of the exhibits in the Phoenix Police Museum:

- One of the earliest exhibits is that of the "Jail Rock". Jack Swilling the founder of Phoenix, was named constable before the area even had a jail house. The legs of the prisoners would be shackled to the "jail rock" to avoid their escape.
- A mock of an old wood and brick marshals office complete with a jail, a figure that represents Marshal Henry Garfias, and a prisoner.
- An exhibit of the Arizona Rangers and the tools of their trade.
- A 1919 Model T Police Cruiser which had a 20-horsepower engine and ran a maximum speed of 45 mph.
- Early Gamewell Co. 1920 Police Telegraph (Call Box). The call boxes were used to notify an officer that headquarters wanted him. These were supplemented by a system of horns and flashing lights.
- There are various law enforcement exhibits which show the evolution of the department, its officers and weapons from its founding to the present.
- A Chevrolet Celebrity Police Cruiser from the 1980s.
- The first helicopter used by the Phoenix Police Department, a Hughes 300C.
- An original prison cell door.
- The museum has a display of police related Patches And Badges.

The museum also has a Memorial Room dedicated to the Phoenix Police Employees who have been killed on duty. Plus, there is also an exhibit honoring our K-9 partners who had duty in the line-of-duty.

=== Ernesto Miranda ===
In 1963, Ernesto Miranda was arrested by the Phoenix Police. He was accused and subsequently convicted of robbing, kidnapping and raping an 18-year-old woman. His case went up to the Supreme Court and the ruling changed the way police departments across the country interrogated suspects. In the museum visitors can view Miranda's official police report, his booking photo and his now-famous confession.

=== Memorial Room ===
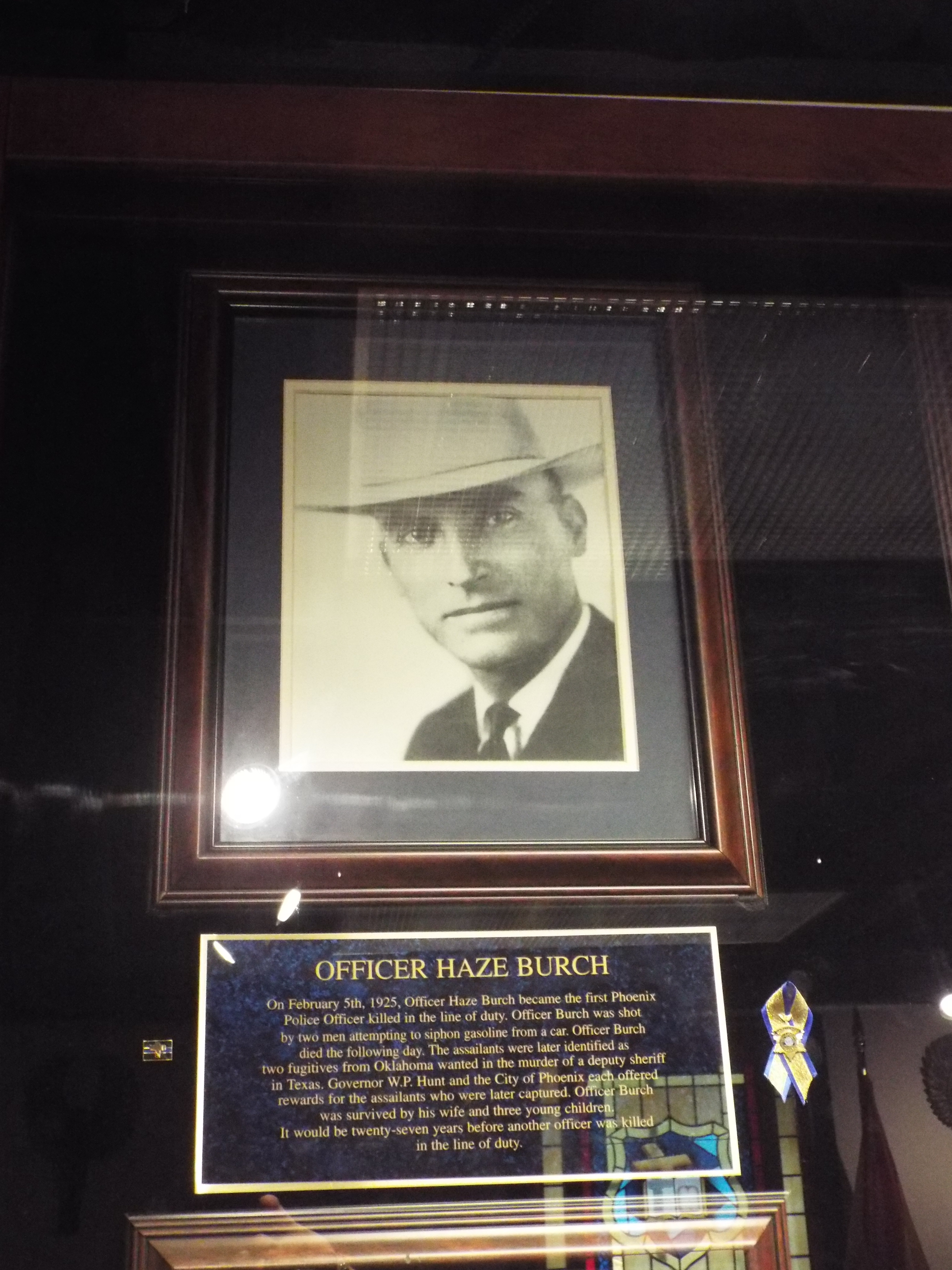
Memorial plaque for Officer William Hazelton "Haze" Burch

The Memorial Room includes many pictures of police officers that have died while on the job, such as William Hazelton "Haze" Burch, the first Phoenix Police officer killed on duty.

== See also ==
- List of historic properties in Phoenix, Arizona
- Cave Creek Museum
- Children's Museum in Phoenix
- Pioneer and Military Memorial Park
- Wells Fargo Museum
- Martin Auto Museum
- List of museums in Arizona
- Phoenix Police Department
