= Arizona Railway Museum =

Museum in Maricopa County, Arizona

- Arizona Railway Museum
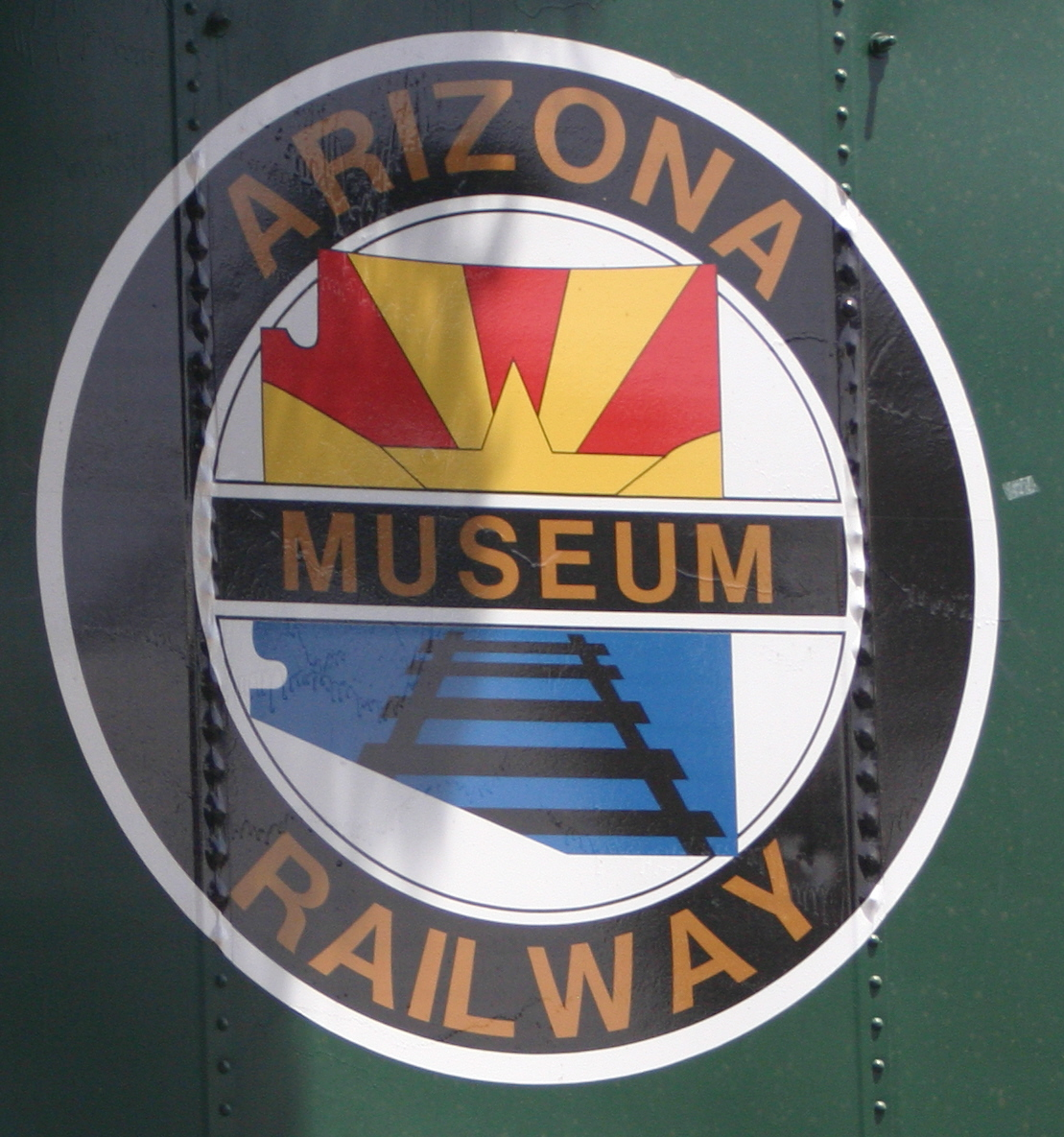
- Established: 1983
- Location: 330 E. Ryan Rd, Chandler, Arizona
- Coordinates: 33.2697°N 111.8363°W
- Type: Railroad rolling stock and artifacts
- Website: Official website

The Arizona Railway Museum is a railroad museum located in Chandler, Arizona, United States.

It was founded and incorporated as a non-profit organization in 1983. It is dedicated to the railroads of Arizona and the Southwestern United States. It has an extensive collection railroad rolling stock and artifacts. Three of the items on display are listed in the National Register of Historic Places, they are the "Southern Pacific Railroad Locomotive No. SP 2562" and "Tender No. 8365", "Railroad Steam Wrecking Crane and Tool Car", and the "Tucson, Cornelia and Gila Bend Railroad Caboose No. 15".

== Collection ==
=== Locomotives ===
Locomotive details
Number	Image	Type	Model	Built	Builder	Status
7		Steam	0-4-0T	1896	Porter	Under restoration
2562		Steam	2-8-0	1906	Baldwin	Display
5		Steam	0-4-0CA	1923	Porter	Display
1		Diesel	ML8	1943	Plymouth	Operational
81		Diesel	JLB	1949	Plymouth	Display
10		Diesel	DRS-6-6-1500	1950	Baldwin	Operational
5022A		Diesel	E8	1950	Electro-Motive Diesel	Stored, privately owned
801		Diesel	35-ton switcher	1957	GE Transportation	Operational

== See also ==
- List of museums in Arizona
- List of heritage railroads in the United States
- List of heritage railways
