= International Wildlife Museum =

Museum in Tucson, Arizona

Coordinates: 32.2343°N 111.0669°W

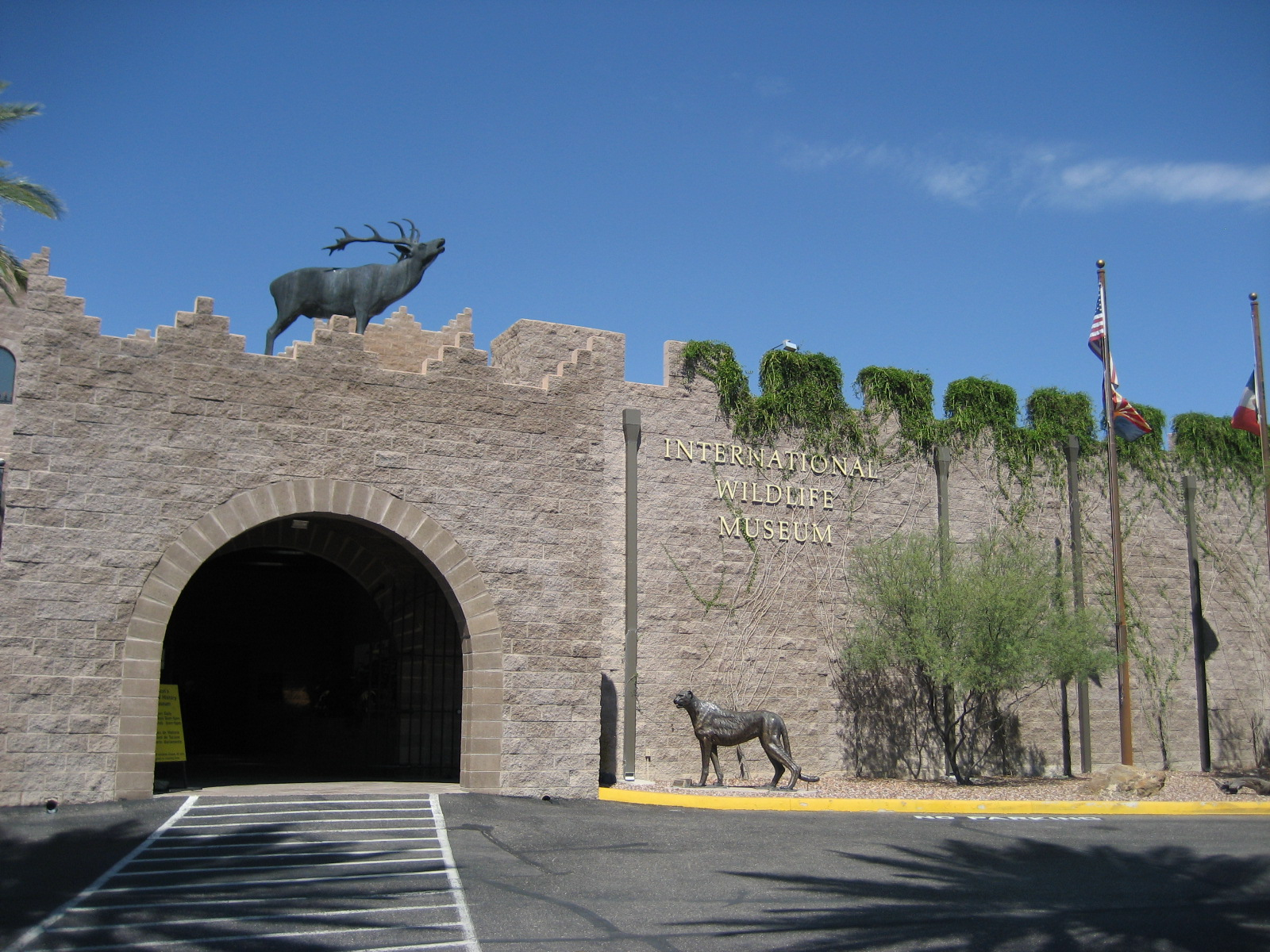
Exterior view of the museum, September 2008

International Wildlife Museum was a non profit natural history museum in Tucson, Arizona. It was established in 1988 by C. J. McElroy as an educational program of the Safari Club International Foundation. On January 11, 2024, the foundation announced on social media and the museum's website that the museum had closed permanently.

== Collection ==
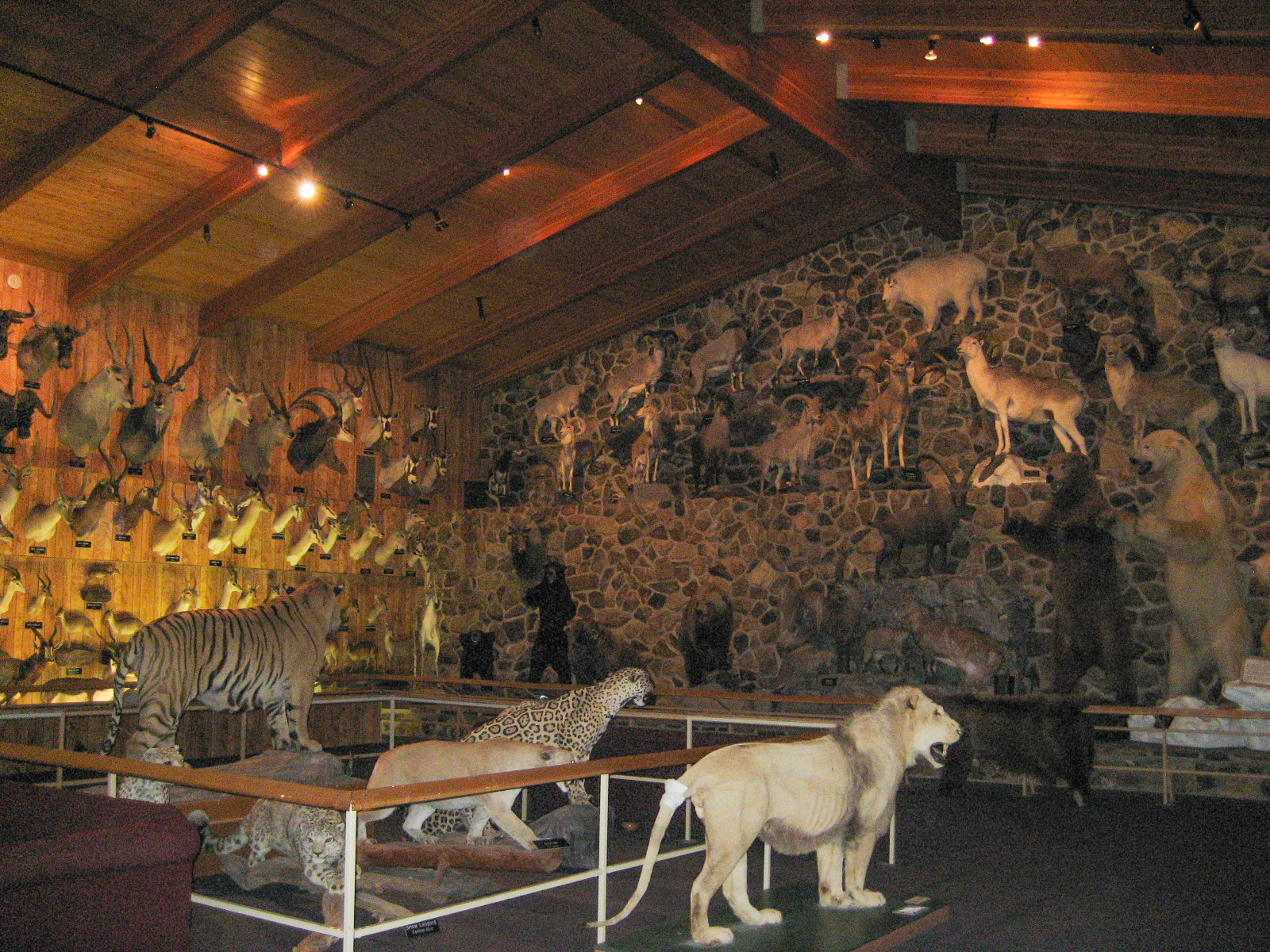
Interior view of museum, September 2008

The museum is a covered 40,000 square foot area and features more than 400 species of birds, insects and mammals. Some of the collection of the museum is more than 100 years old and were donated by government agencies, rehabilitation centers and captive breeding programs. The taxidermy displays include dioramas and mounted heads. The museum also features the “Big Terror”, a tiger killed in India in 1969, a rhinoceros taken by President Theodore Roosevelt, the Irish elk with 13 foot antlers, penguins from Richard E. Byrd’s South Pole discovery trip, a passenger pigeon and a woolly mammoth. The museum has been criticized for its amateurishness and out-of-date International Union for Conservation of Nature conservation status ratings.

== Closure ==
After the museum had been "temporarily closed" for an unknown period of time, the Safari Club International Foundation posted on Facebook and the museum's website on January 11, 2024, that it was closed permanently.

Safari Club International Foundation wishes to inform you that the International Wildlife Museum in Tucson, AZ, closed its doors on December 31, 2023. All scheduled events after this date are canceled. Efforts are being made to return the taxidermy on loan from other organizations. The remaining museum's taxidermy, animals, and exhibits will be relocated to new locations to continue educating the public on wildlife appreciation and the role of wildlife management in conservation. The Safari Club International Foundation expresses gratitude to the public, museum's members, volunteers, workers, and donors who have generously supported the museum over the years, and for your ongoing commitment to the Safari Club International Foundation.
