= Trail Dust Town =

Historical shopping area in Tucson, Arizona

Coordinates: 32°14′50″N 110°51′11″W

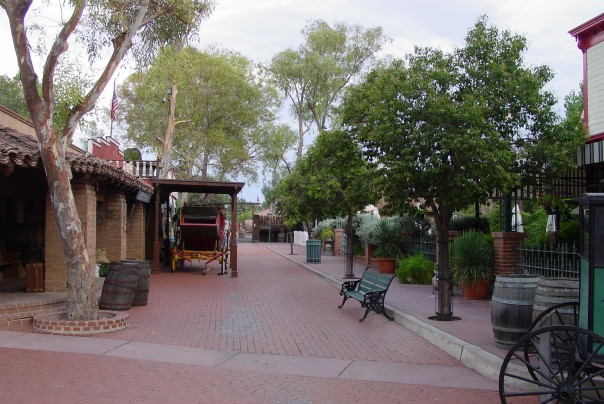
A view of the interior of Trail Dust Town

Trail Dust Town is an Old West-themed shopping plaza and entertainment attraction located in Tucson, Arizona.

Although Trail Dust Town operates as a for-profit shopping mall, on its grounds exists a great number of historical artifacts, including an Allan Herschell merry-go-round which was manufactured in 1954 that still contains its original horses and benches.

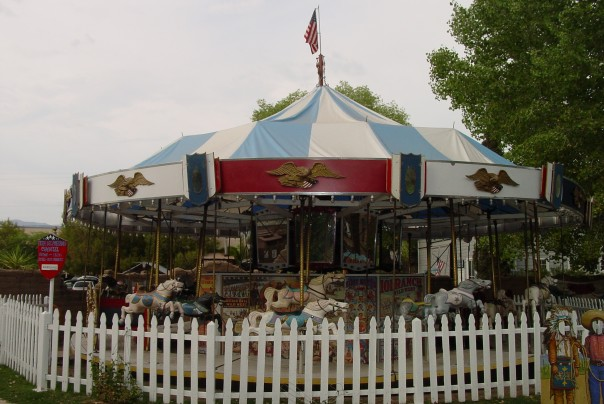
The 1920s Allan Herschell carousel within the complex

== History ==
Trail Dust Town first opened in 1961. It was built by developer Howard Hamm on a former movie set for a 1951 Glenn Ford film that was never completed.

When Trail Dust Town first opened, it featured retail shopping. Pinnacle Peak Steakhouse was built in 1962 and quickly became a popular destination; it was featured on the Cooking Channel show Man v. Food in 2019.

=== Playbox Theatre ===
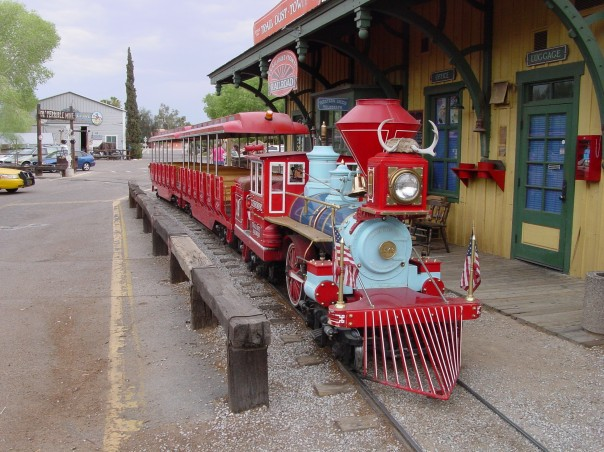
Slim-gauge railway with a picture of the Museum of the Horse Soldier in the far left background

From 1961 to 1982, Trail Dust Town was the site of one of Tucson's earliest community theater companies, Playbox Theatre. Playbox started several years earlier in a vacant church near the University of Arizona (later home to the Loft Theater, an early art film theater in Tucson) but it moved to Trail Dust Town in order to grow. The building (including the stage which still stands) is now called The Savoy Opera House and it is rented out for banquets and other events.

=== Museum of the Horse Soldier ===
Trail Dust Town was also home to a non-profit history museum; Museum of the Horse Soldier. The museum chronicled the history of U.S. mounted military service. It was notable for having one of the nation's largest public displays artifacts from the era of the military horse, including original period saddles, uniforms, weapons, firearms, and ephemera. The museum incorporated in Jan. 2013 and received recognition from around the world, including the British Broadcasting Corporation (BBC), History Channel, Discovery Channel, Arizona Highways, and multiple publications. Some of the museum's highlights included the only Civil War collection available to the public in the state of AZ and rare U.S. military saddles from the 1830s-present day. The Museum officially moved out of Trail Dust Town in June of 2019 and has yet to find a new home.

== Constituent attractions ==
=== Trail Dust Town Railroad ===
The Trail Dust Town Railroad is a narrow-gauge, motorized train that runs on a looped 24" track. The railroad loads patrons at Trail Dust Town's train depot, which is modeled after the Delaware, Lackawanna and Western Railroad station located in Wallace, New York. The engine, named "C. P. Huntington", and numbered 287, pulls two passenger cars around the town and passes through several theme areas, two tunnels, and across several working, but miniature crossings.

=== Pistoleros Wild West Show ===
Performed twice per evening, Friday through Sunday, Trail Dust Town's stunt show is a slapstick comedy homage to the wild west. The shows, which vary from twenty to thirty minutes in length, are performed are on Dragoon St. towards the northern end of Trail Dust Town. The outdoor theater seats roughly 175 patrons on metal bench seating. Most shows feature falls from the top of two story buildings, dynamite explosion effects and many "rough and tumble" choreographed fights.
