= American Museum of Nursing =

Former museum in Tempe, Arizona

Coordinates: 33.440413°N 111.940692°W

- Established: 1993
- Location: Arizona
- Director: Rojann Alpers
- Website: American Museum of Nursing

The American Museum of Nursing was part of Arizona State University College of Nursing. It was located in Tempe, Arizona, United States. It featured exhibits of uniforms, posters, medical care items, photographs and other nursing memorabilia, a research library, rare document room, and an archive. The collections are now part of the International Nursing Museum in Scottsdale, Arizona, which is seeking a permanent location.
