= Wells Fargo Museum (Phoenix) =

Museum in Phoenix, Arizona

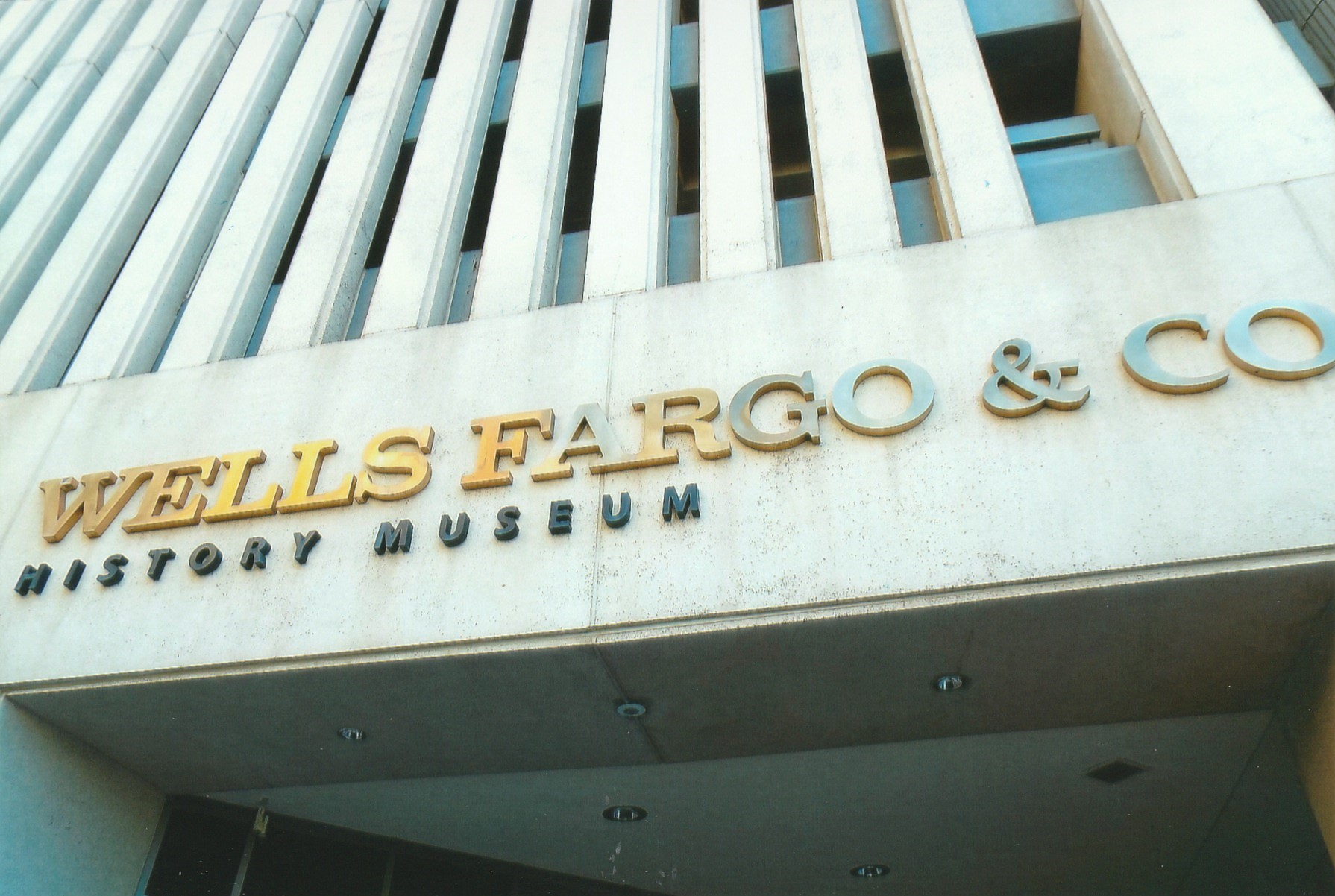
- Wells Fargo Museum
- Dissolved: September 2020
- Location: 145 W Adams St; Phoenix, Arizona
- Coordinates: 33.4492°N 112.0758°W

The Wells Fargo Museum in Phoenix was one of eleven museums throughout the United States of the Wells Fargo Bank. The other museums were located in Alaska, Charlotte, Des Moines, Los Angeles, Minneapolis, Philadelphia, Portland, Sacramento, San Diego and San Francisco. The Phoenix museum was located in downtown Phoenix in the Wells Fargo Plaza.

The museum highlighted the role which Wells Fargo played in the settlement of the Territory of Arizona by the pioneers from the eastern United States. The museum had various exhibits. Among the exhibits was a replica of a 19th-century Wells Fargo bank branch.

Following its closure due to COVID-19 restrictions in early 2020, the museum was closed permanently in September 2020, along with most other Wells Fargo Museums.

== Exhibits ==
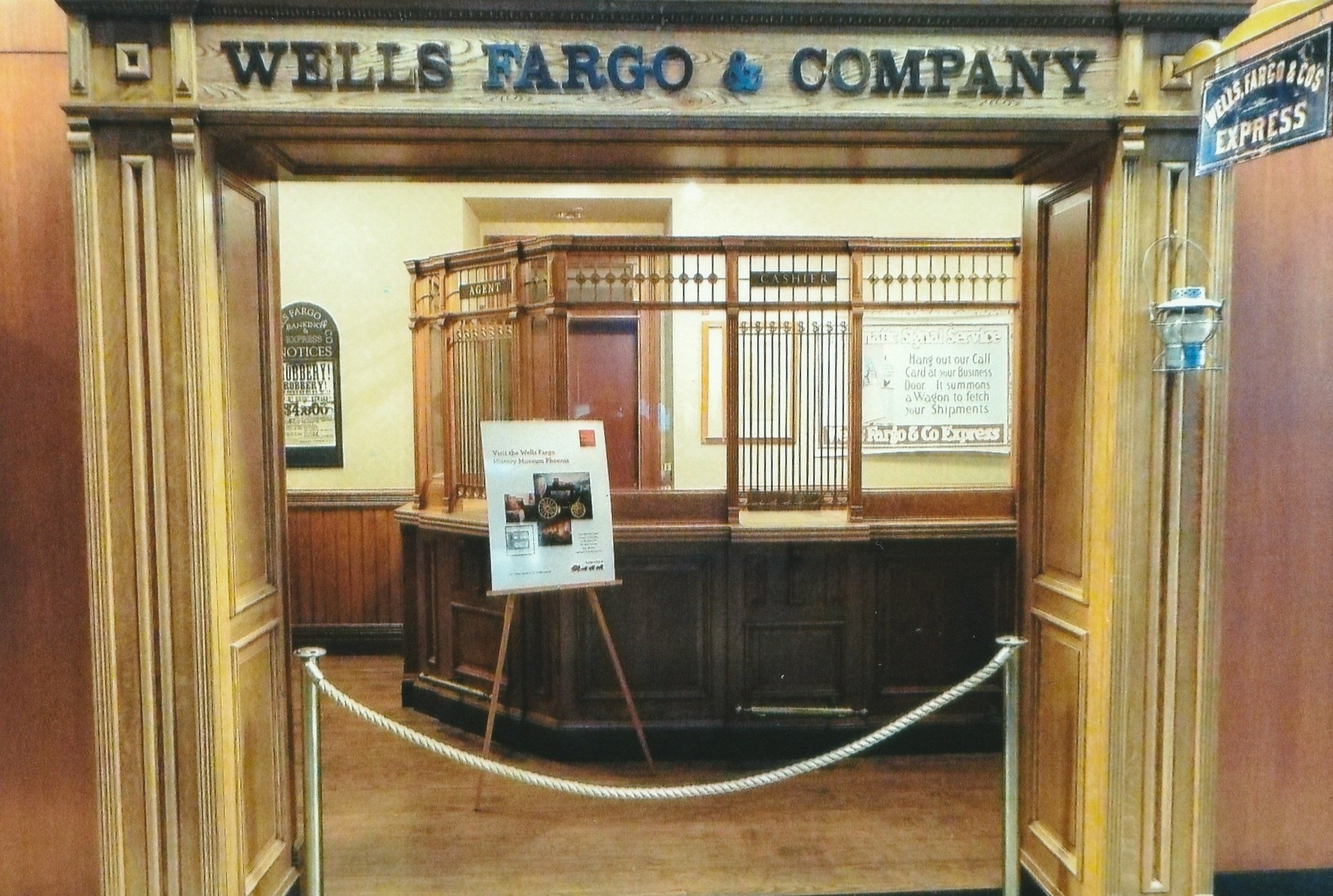
1920 Wells Fargo Bank.

Among the exhibits in the museum were the following:

- An authentic 1879 Wells Fargo stagecoach.
- A replica stagecoach in which visitors can climb aboard.
- Gold and precious minerals.
- A working telegraph.
- Two antique telephones in which visitors can communicate with each other.

=== The Isaias W. Hellman gun collection ===
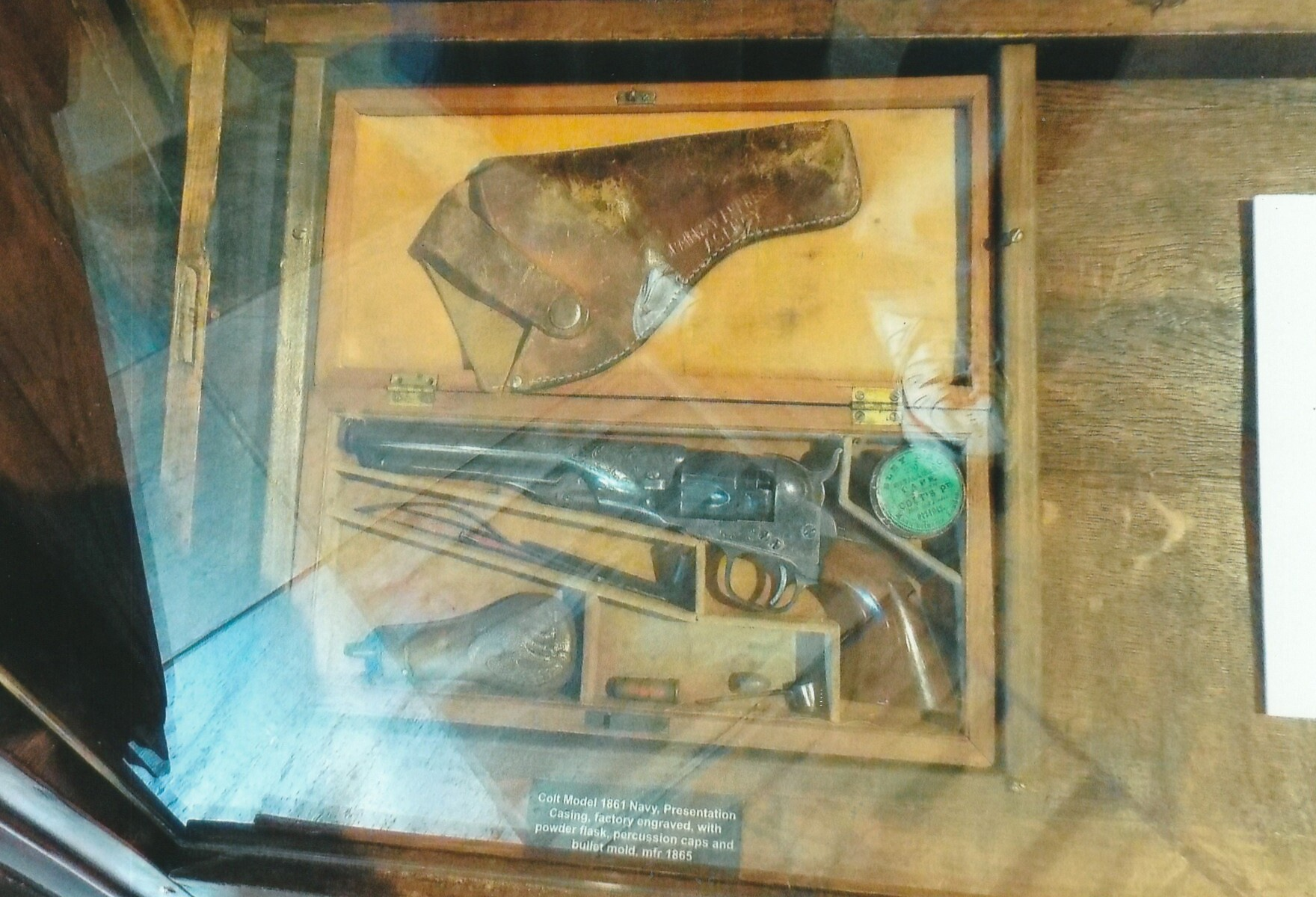
Colt Model 1861 Navy Pistol in the I. W. Hellman Gun Collection.

Isaias W. Hellman was an immigrant from Bavaria who started his first bank in his store. He became a successful businessman and was the owner of the Nevada National Bank. His bank merged with Wells Fargo in 1905. Hellman was also a gun collector who owned an impressive gun collection. He served as president of Wells Fargo until his death in 1920. His gun collection was donated to the museum where it was exhibited.

=== Art Gallery ===
The museum had an art gallery which exhibits the art works of N.C. Wyeth and Frank Earle Schoonover among others.

==== N.C. Wyeth’s art work ====
The museum offers the visitor the opportunity to view and admire the world's largest collection of famed illustrator N.C. Wyeth’s western themed work. Wyeth collected information on mining and brought home costumes and artifacts, including cowboy and Indian clothing. His early trips to the western United States inspired a period of images of cowboys and Native Americans that dramatized the Old West.

==== Frank Earle Schoonover ====
Schoonover was a contributor to books and magazines. He illustrated the stories of Clarence Mulford’s "Hopalong Cassidy" and Edgar Rice Burroughs's "A Princess of Mars". The painting "There’ll Be Hell to Pay" displayed in the museum is one which related to the Hopalong Cassidy series. Schoonover helped to organize what is now the Delaware Art Museum.

=== Trustrim Connell's Medal of Honor ===
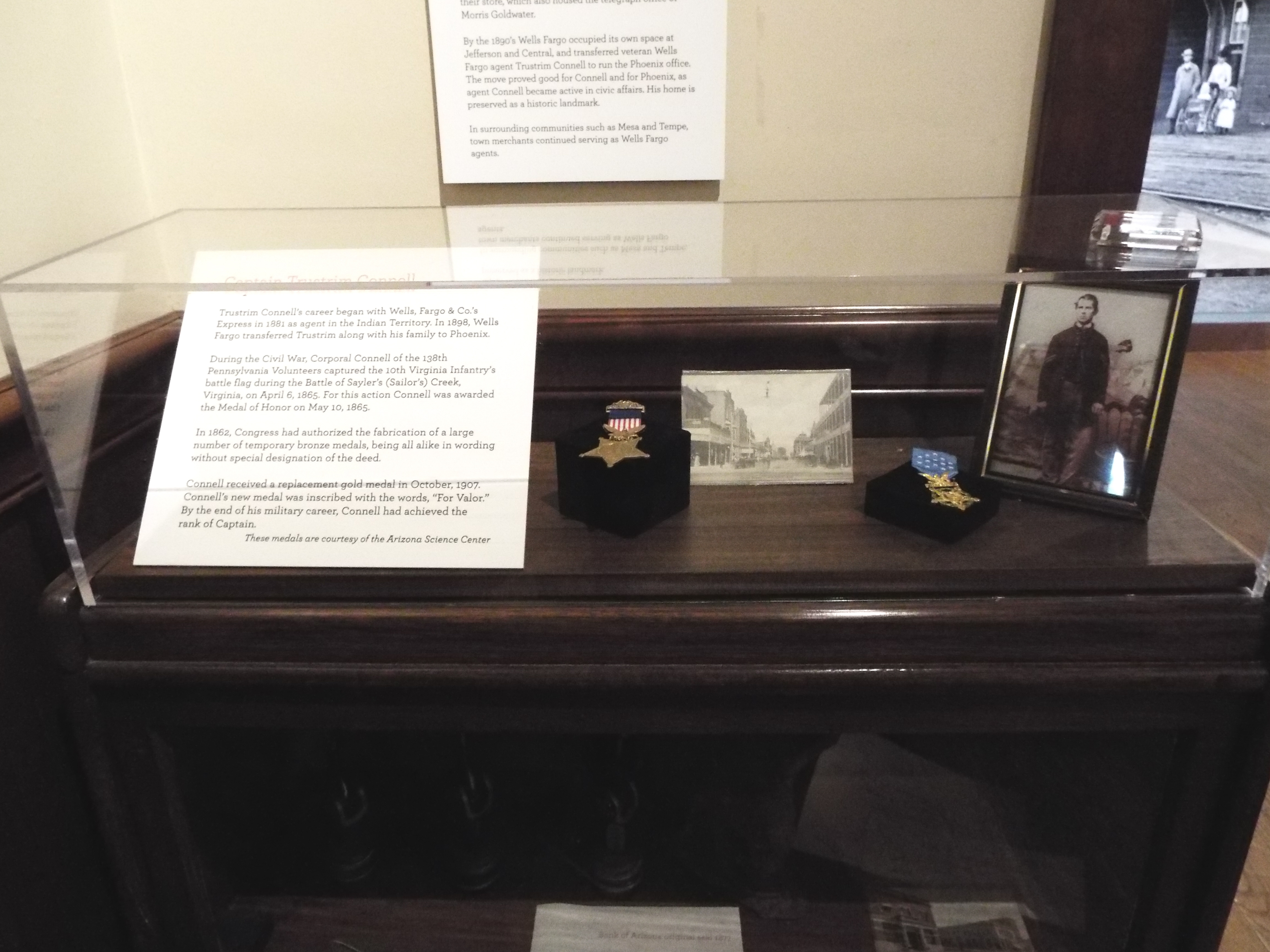
Display dedicated to Trustrim Connell

There was a display in the museum dedicated to Captain Trustrim Connell, the recipient of the Medal of Honor. Trustrim Connell was a member of the Union Army during the American Civil War. During the Battle of Saylor's (Sailor's) Creek in Virginia, Corporal Connell captured a Confederate flag which at the time was considered enough to earn a soldier the Medal of Honor. He was awarded the Medal of Honor on May 10, 1865. The early medals were awarded without any specification of the heroic deed. After the war Connell was placed in charge of the Indian territory, including all of the Wells Fargo Company business, in Arizona. In 1898, the Connell family moved to the City of Phoenix. In October 1907, Connell received a Gold Medal in replacement with the inscription "For Valor". In Phoenix he was employed by the American Railway Express Company, until his retirement in 1925.

== Gallery of museum exhibits ==
Wells Fargo Museum

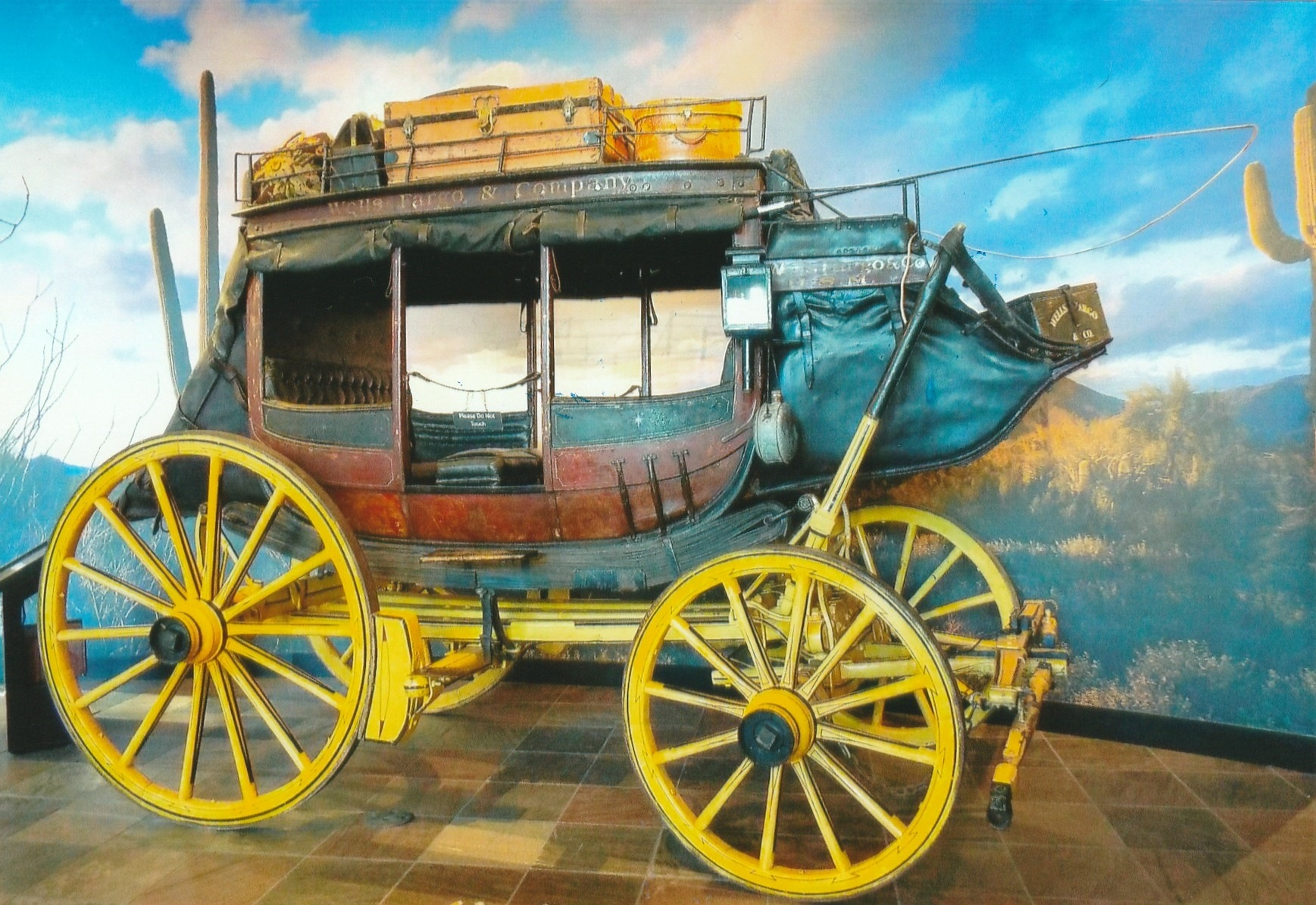
1879 Wells fargo Stagecoach

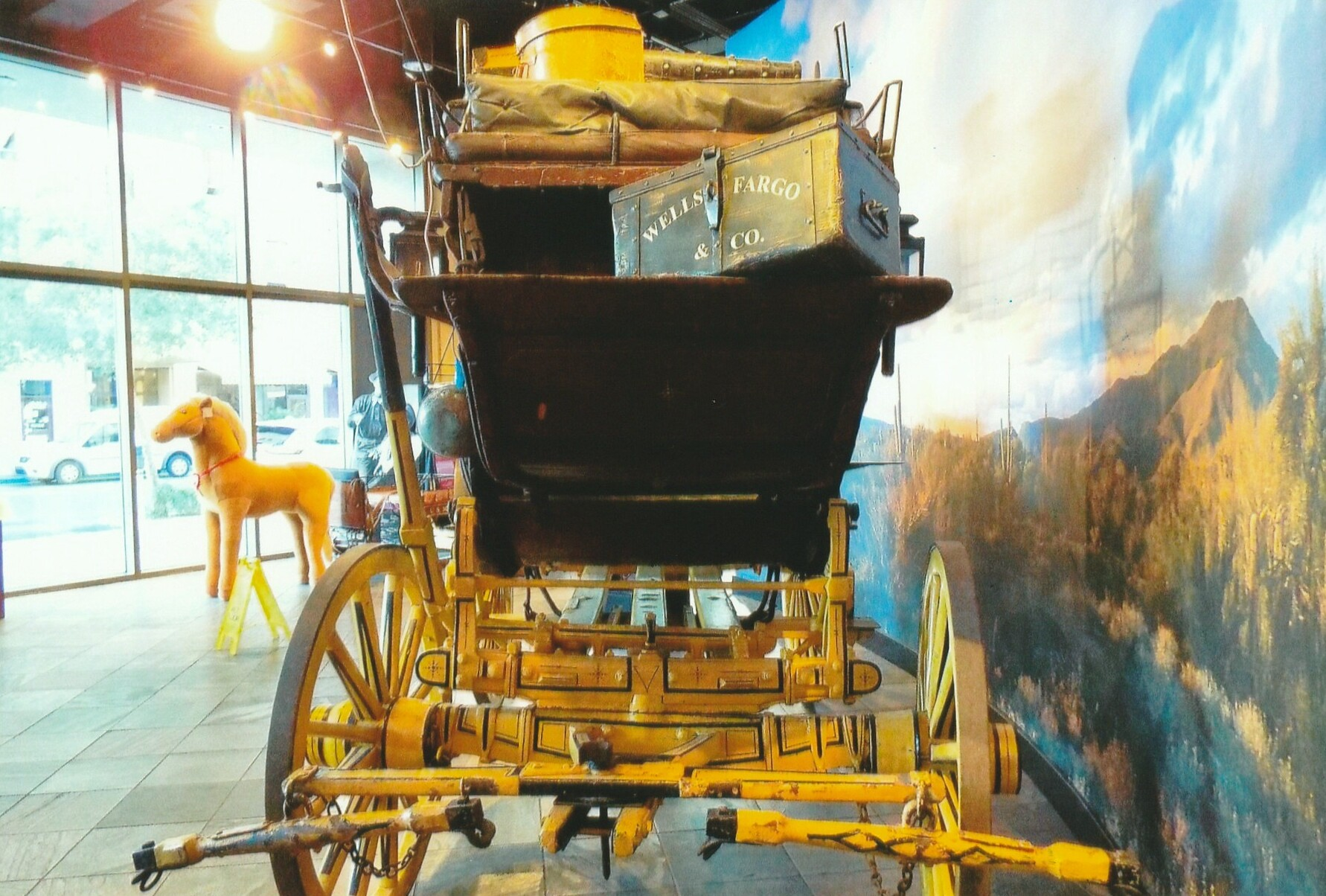
Front view of 1879 Wells Fargo Stagecoach.

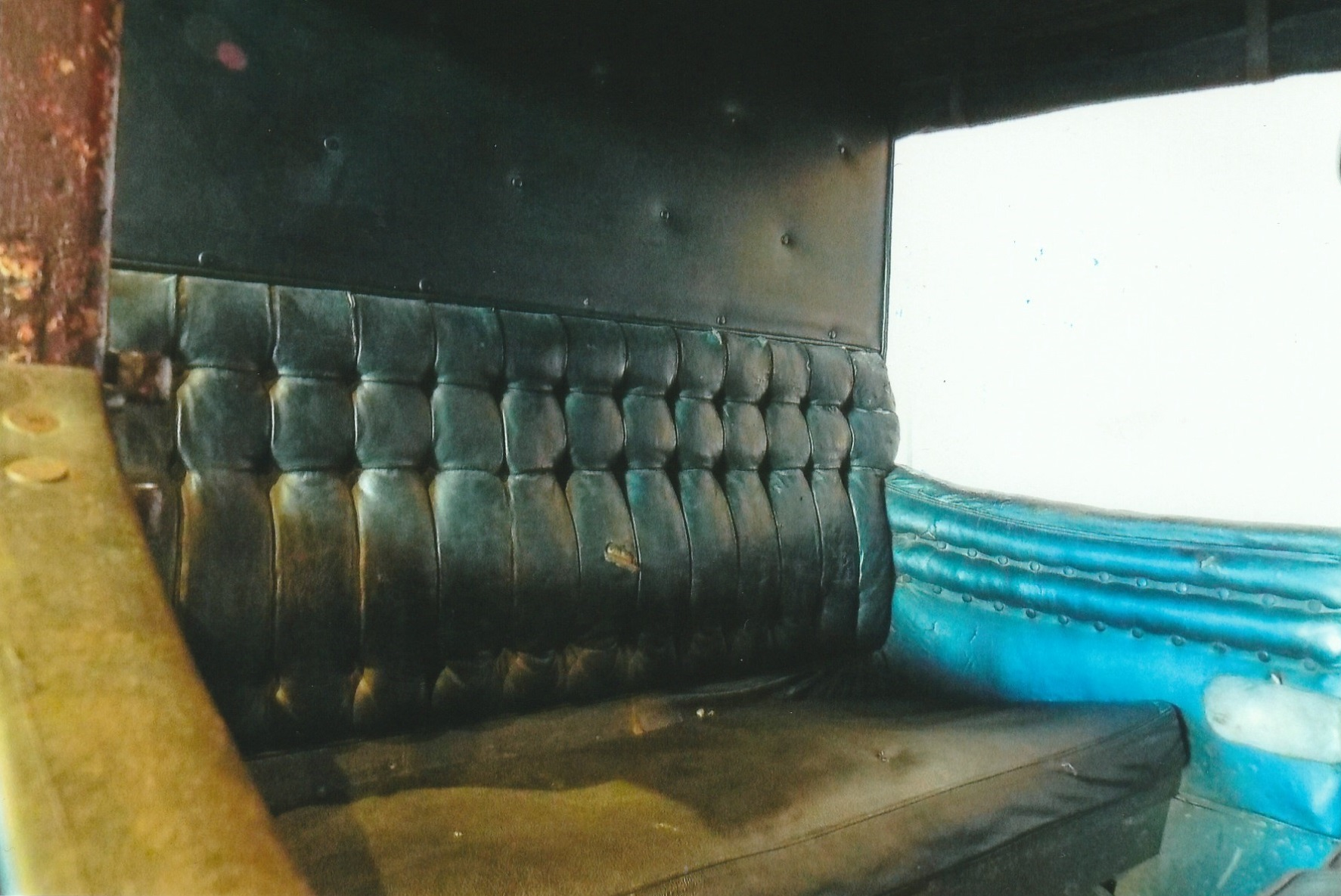
Inside the 1879 stagecoach.

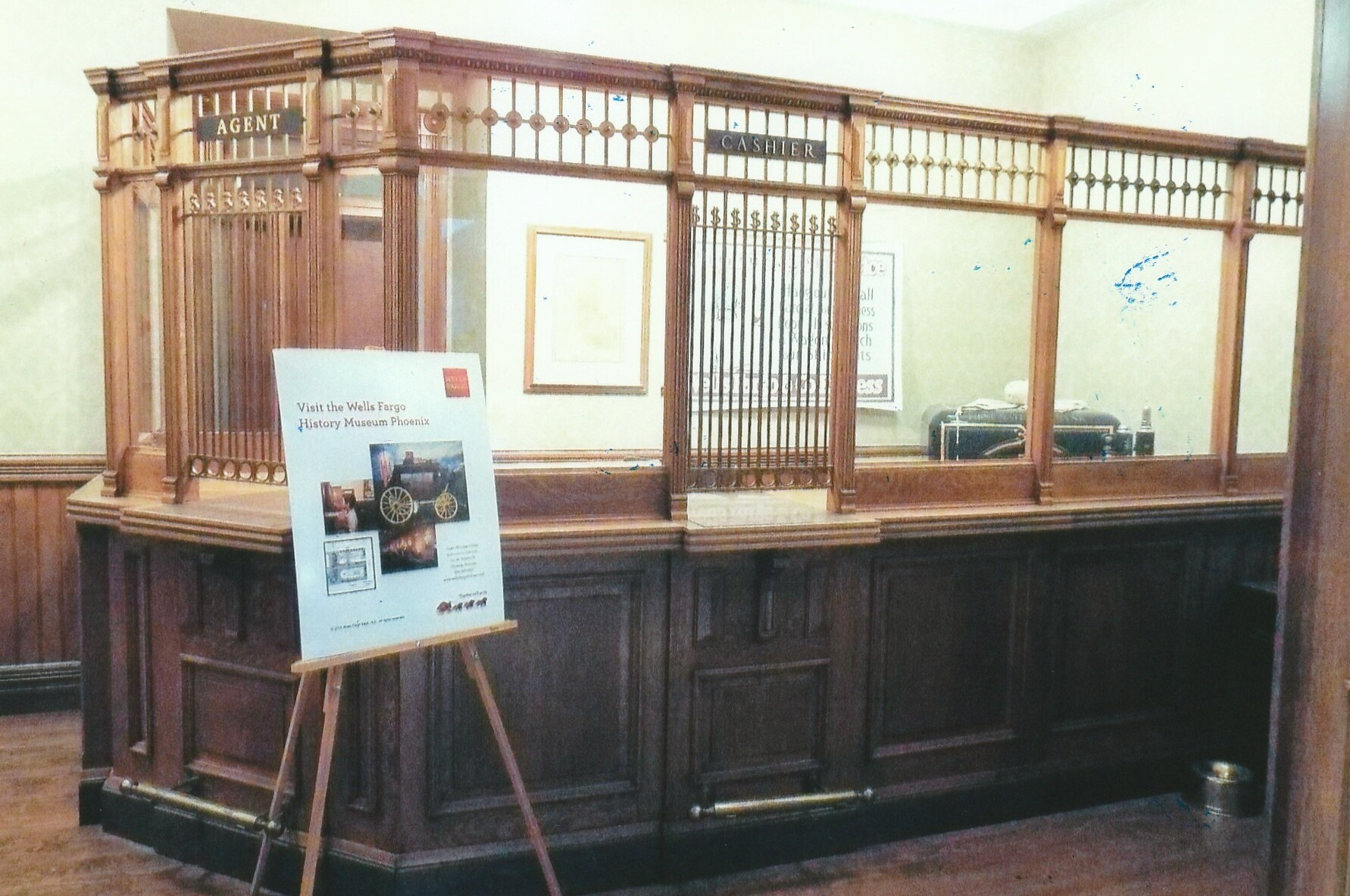
1920s Tellers Cage.

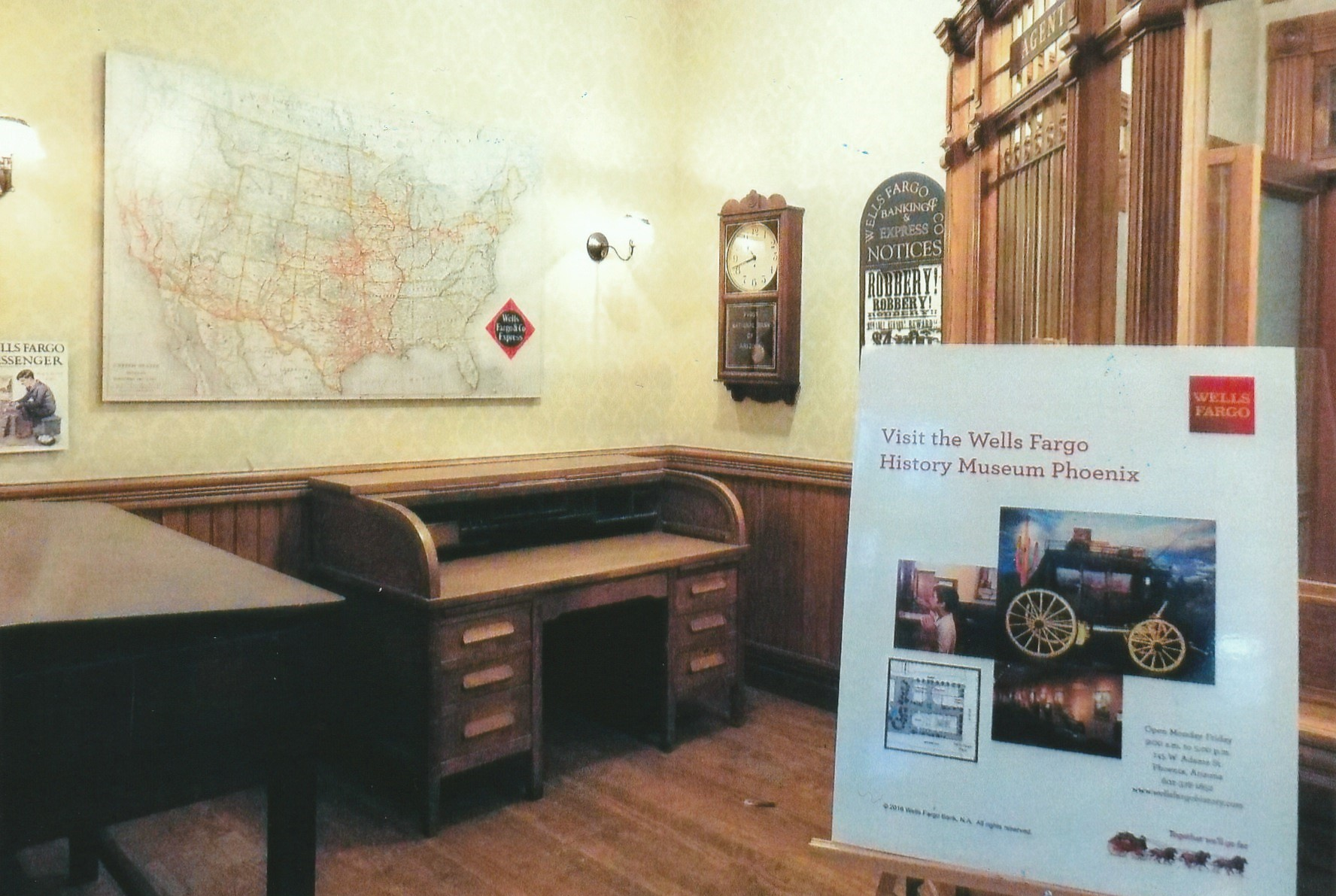
1920s Bank Manager's Office.

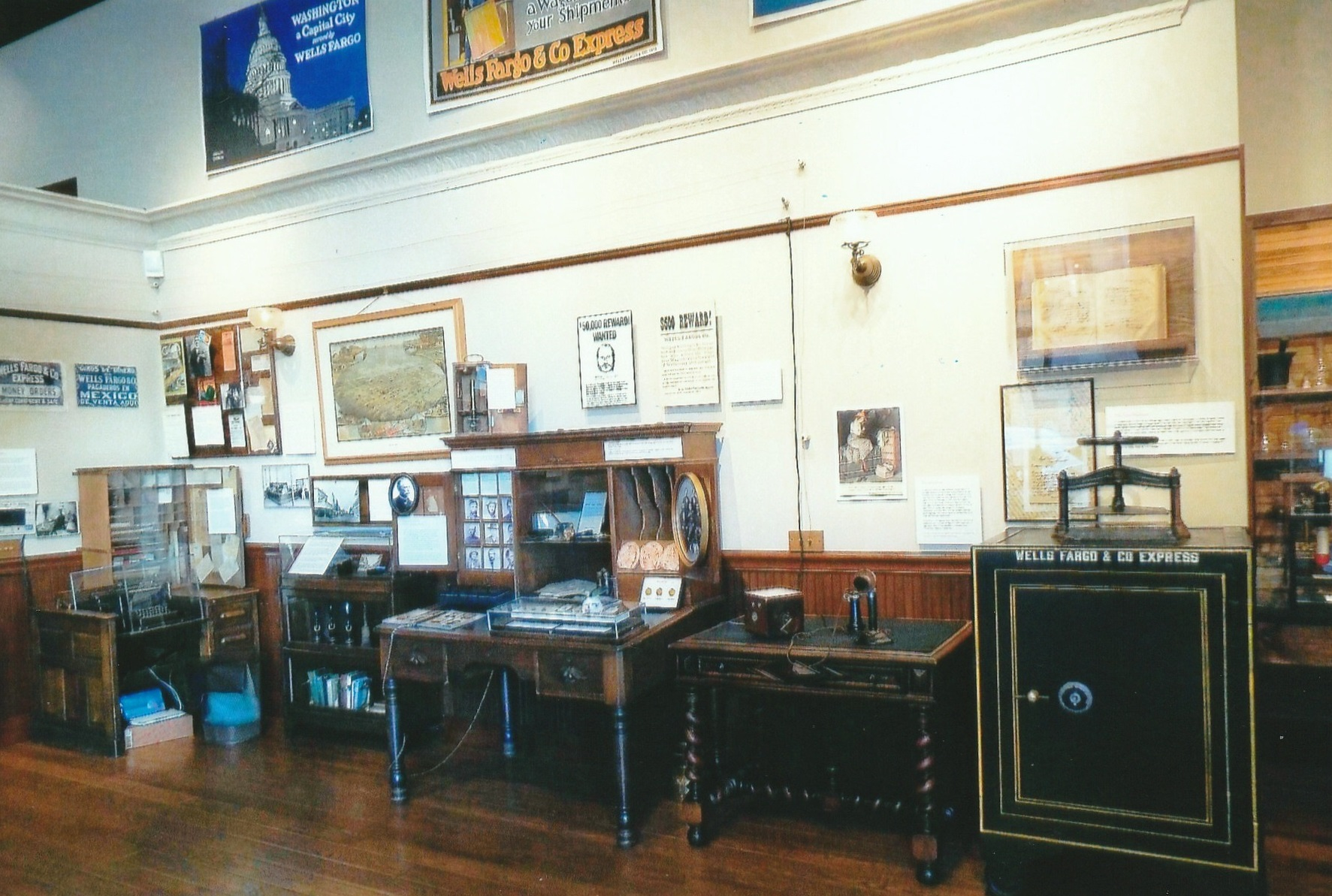
Bank exhibit

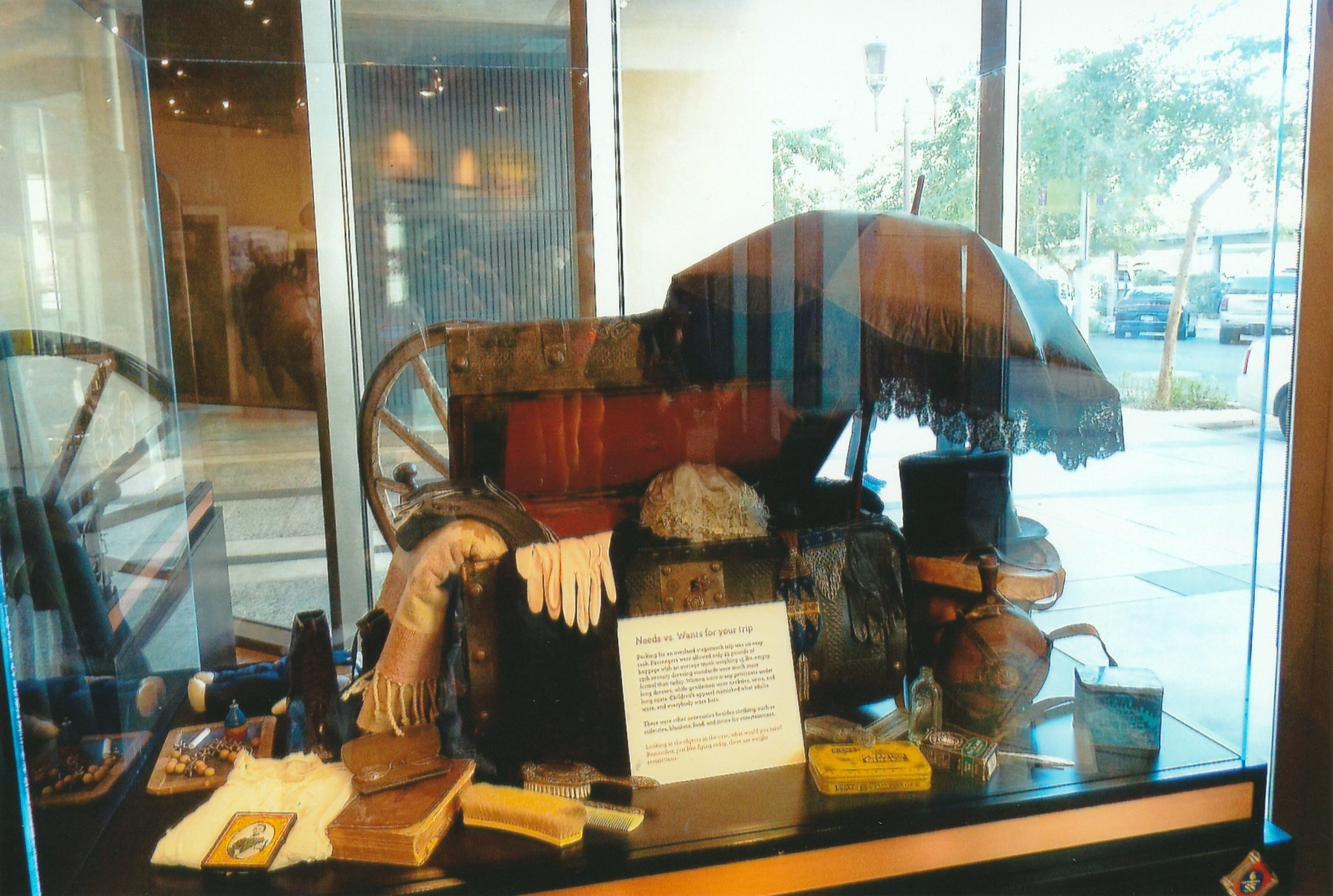
One of many exhibits.

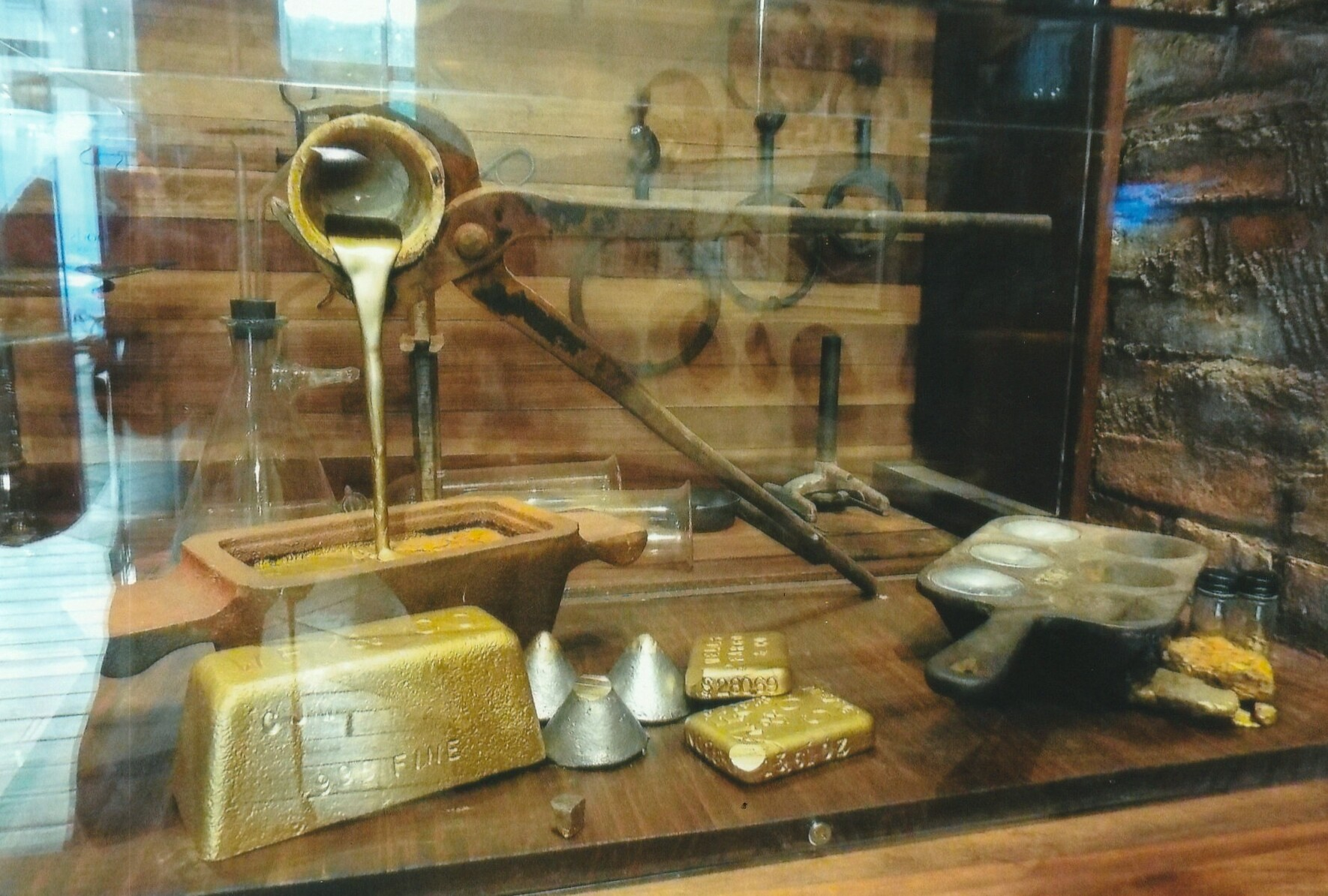
Gold exhibit.

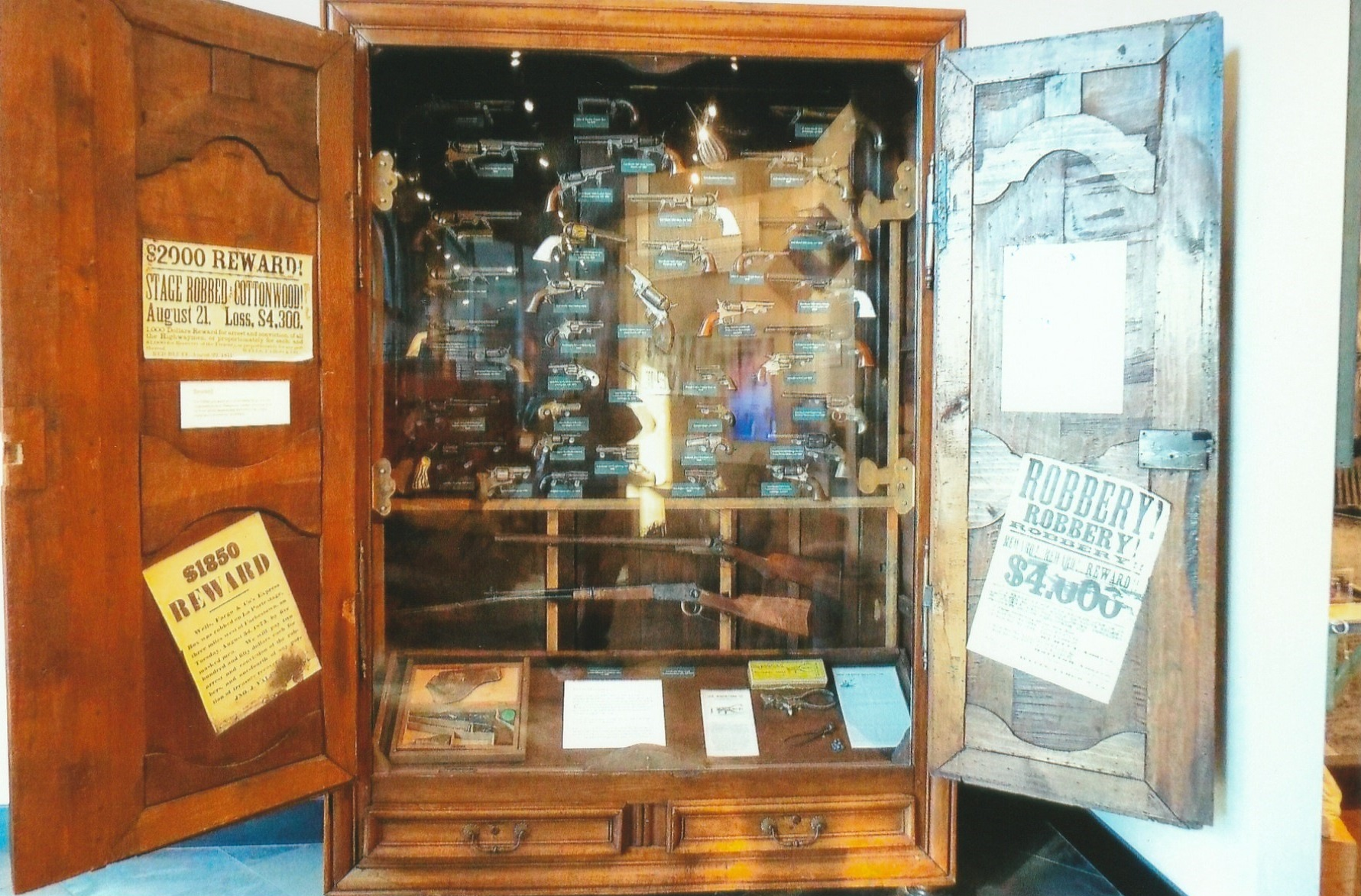
The I. W. Hellman Gun Collection.
Wells Fargo Museum Art Gallery
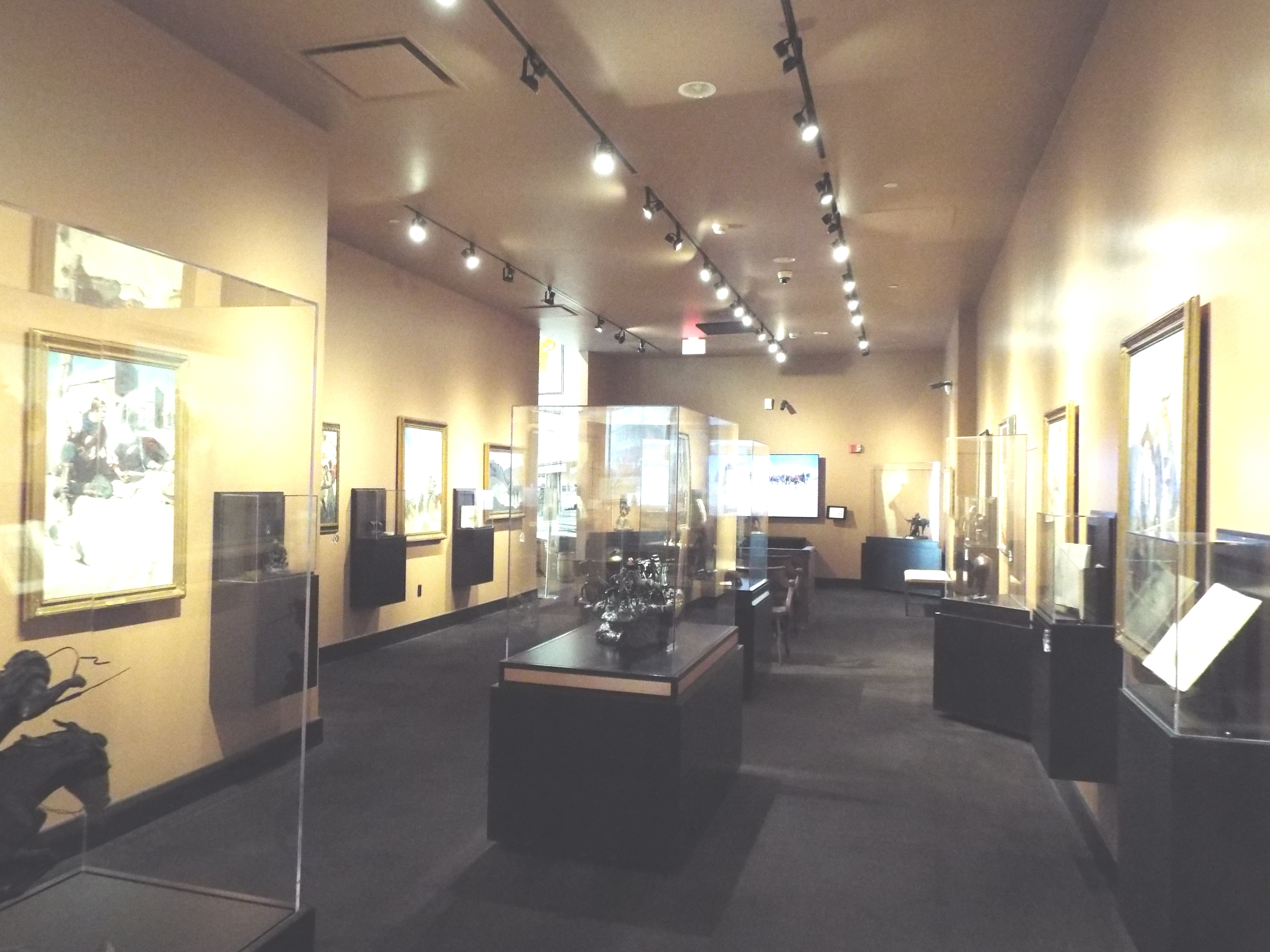
The Art Gallery

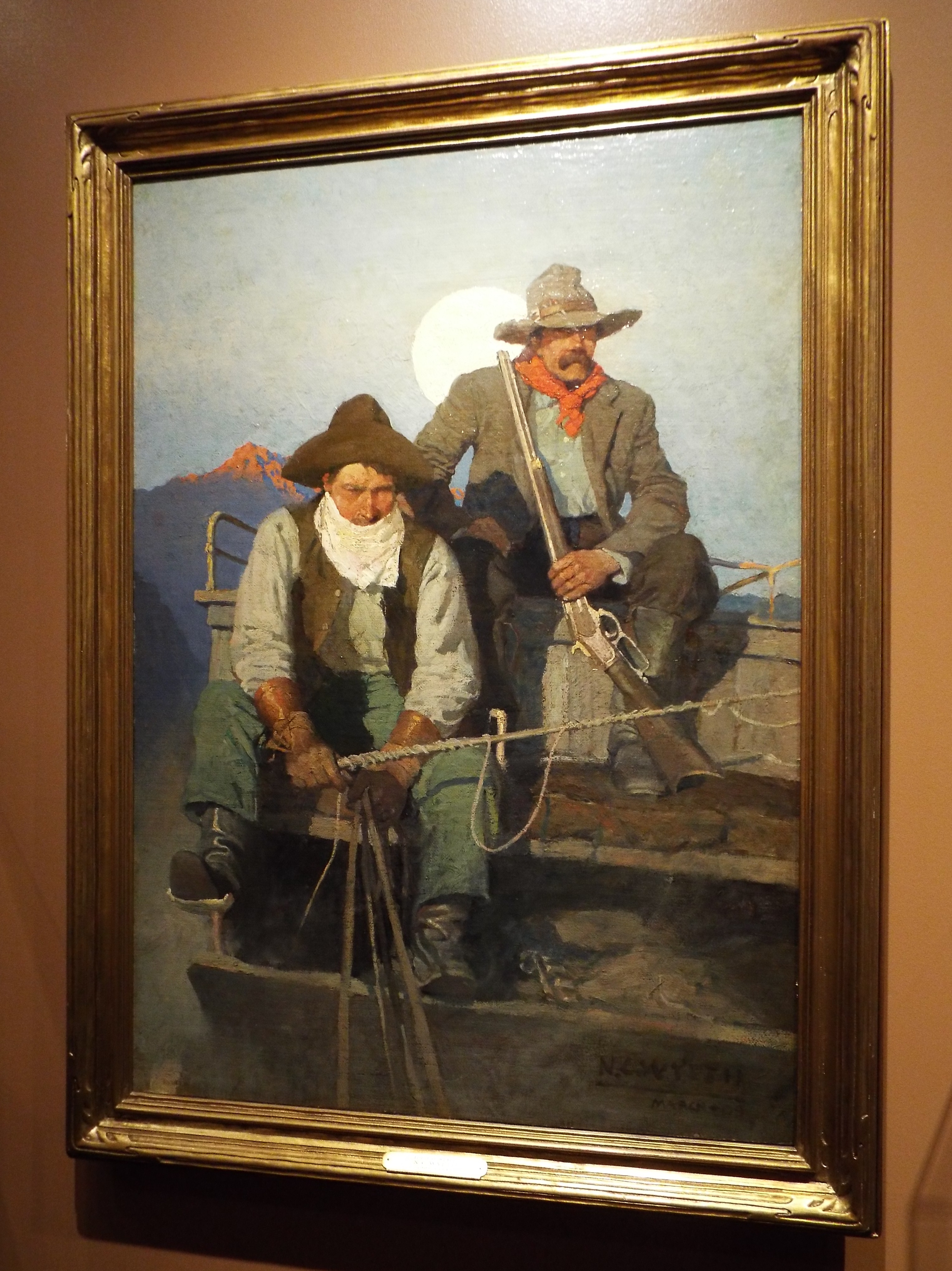
"The Pay Stage"

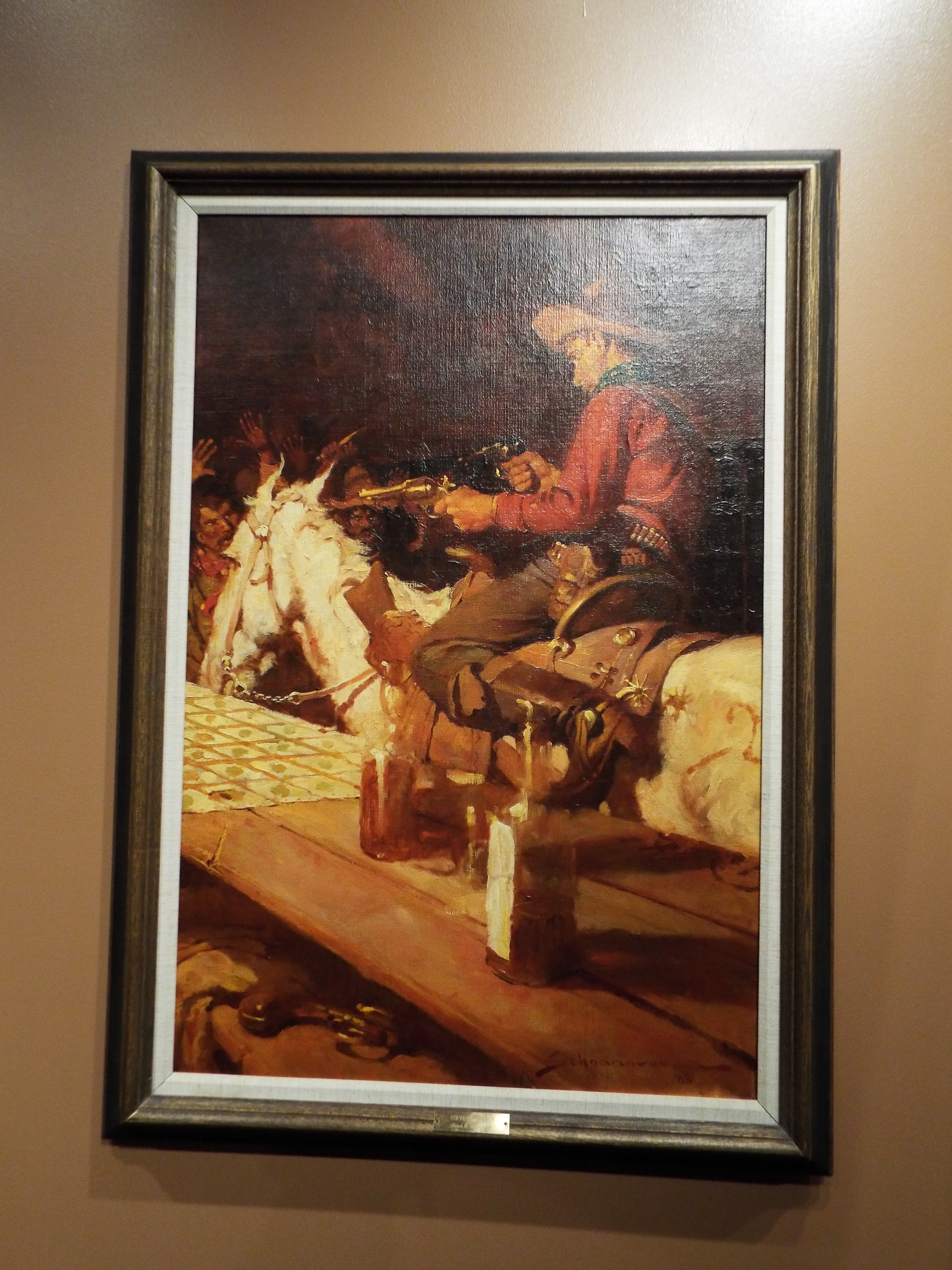
"There'll Be Hell to Pay"

== See also ==
- List of historic properties in Phoenix, Arizona
- Children's Museum in Phoenix
- Cave Creek Museum
- Pioneer and Military Memorial Park
- Martin Auto Museum
- Phoenix Police Museum
- List of museums in Arizona
- Wells Fargo
