= John S. McCain III Library and Museum =

Planned museum in Tempe, Arizona

- Interactive map of the John S. McCain III Library and Museum area

General information
- Location: 200 E. Curry Road, Tempe, Arizona
- Coordinates: 33°26′26″N 111°56′27″W
- Named for: John McCain
- Construction started: January 29, 2026; 5 months ago

Design and construction
- Architect: SHoP Architects
- Main contractor: Clark Construction; Chasse Building Team

Website
- mccainlibrary.asu.edu

The John S. McCain III Library and Museum is a planned library and museum built in honor of former Arizona senator and 2008 Republican presidential nominee, John McCain. The museum being constructed as a collaboration between the McCain Institute and Arizona State University.

The library and museum is being constructed on the former site of the Arizona State Tuberculosis Sanitarium, and later ASU’s Community Services Building in Papago Park in Tempe, Arizona.

== History ==
John McCain donated over a thousand boxes of his papers to Arizona State University in 2012. These boxes included records, photographs, notes, and letters as well as memorabilia items, such as hats, buttons, T-shirts, posters and banners. This archive of materials became known as the McCain Collection, and served as the foundation of the materials that will be held at the library.

The library and museum were announced by then President Joe Biden on September 28, 2023 on a visit to Tempe. McCain and Biden developed a close friendship over decades in the Senate, built on mutual respect, bipartisan cooperation, and a shared belief in public service. Biden was joined by Arizona Governor Katie Hobbs and members of the McCain family at the announcement for the museum. $83 million of federal funding was granted to the project as part of the American Rescue Plan.

The museum broke ground on January 29, 2026.
