= Maricopa Live Steamers =

Organization in Arizona

Maricopa Live Steamers Railroad Heritage Preservation Society
- Location: Phoenix, Arizona
- Region served: Phoenix metropolitan area
- Members: Approximately 250
- Website: www.maricopalivesteamers.com
- Formerly called: Maricopa Live Steamers

The Maricopa Live Steamers Railroad Heritage Preservation Society is a live steamer club in Phoenix, Arizona. Their Adobe Western Railway, a 7 1/2 in (190.5 mm) gauge miniature railway, has eighteen miles (29 km) of track. They also offer free train rides to the public.

== See also ==
- List of heritage railroads in the United States
