= Dinnerware Artspace =

Gallery in Tucson, Arizona

Coordinates: 32.227526°N 110.977152°W

Dinnerware Artspace is a non-profit art space located in Tucson, Arizona, United States. Dinnerware Artspace has had several locations. The director in the 2000s and 2010s was David Aguirre.
