= Martin Auto Museum =

Martin Auto Museum and Event Center
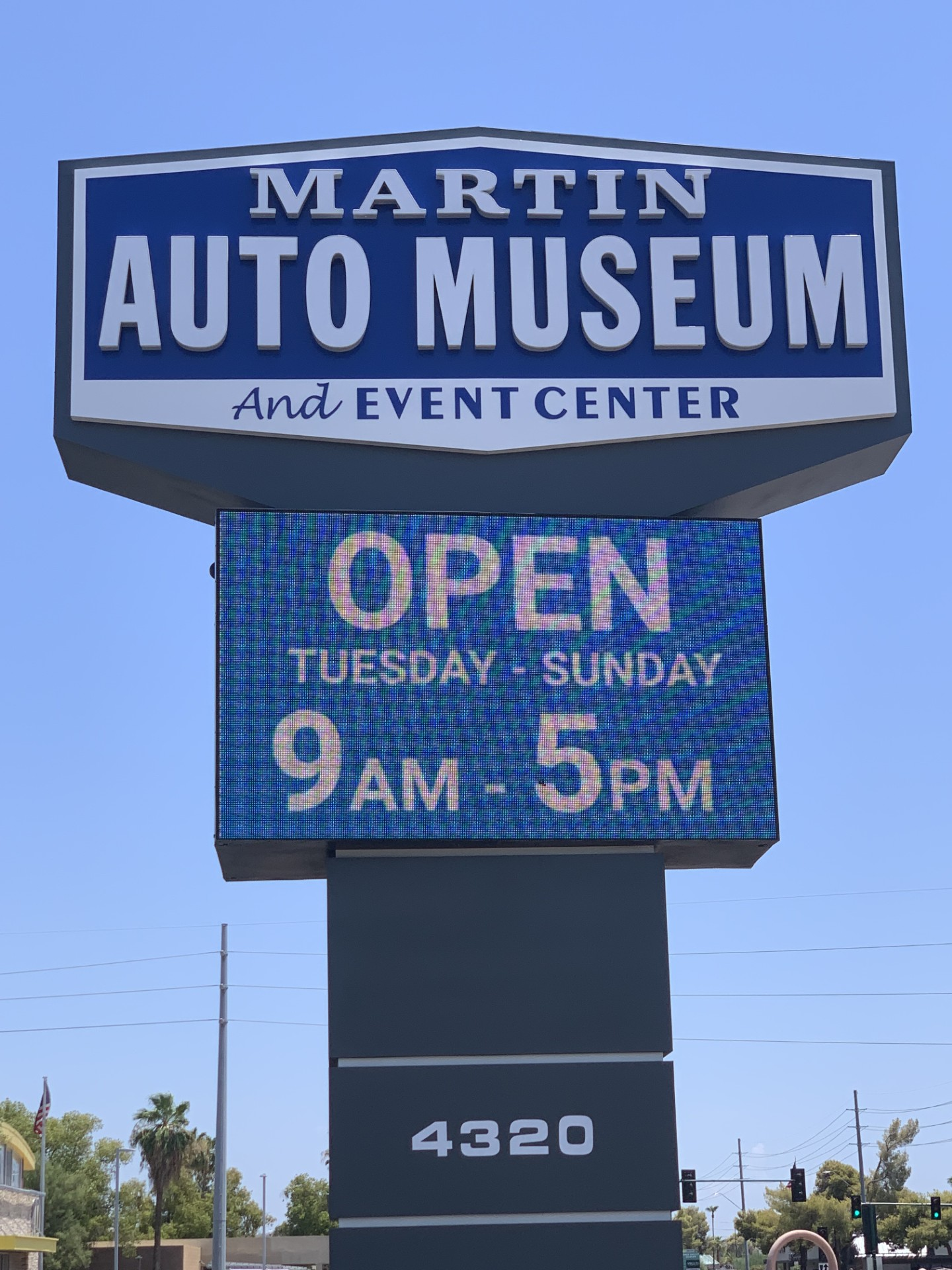

- Location in Arizona Location in United States
- Established: 2008; 18 years ago
- Location: 4320 West Thunderbird Road; Glendale, Arizona
- Coordinates: 33°36′44.28″N 112°9′9.08″W
- Type: Car museum and Event Center
- Key holdings: Vintage historical and classic cars
- Collections: Automotive/Automobilia
- Collection size: >175 Vehicle plus automobia
- Founder: Mel Martin
- Website: martinautomuseum.org

The Martin Auto Museum and Event Center is a privately owned non-profit automobile museum located in Glendale, Arizona. The museum is dedicated to the preservation of collectible automobiles for educational purposes. Some of the services provided by the museum include guided tours for such groups as local schoolchildren, veteran organizations and car clubs.

== History ==
=== Mel Martin ===
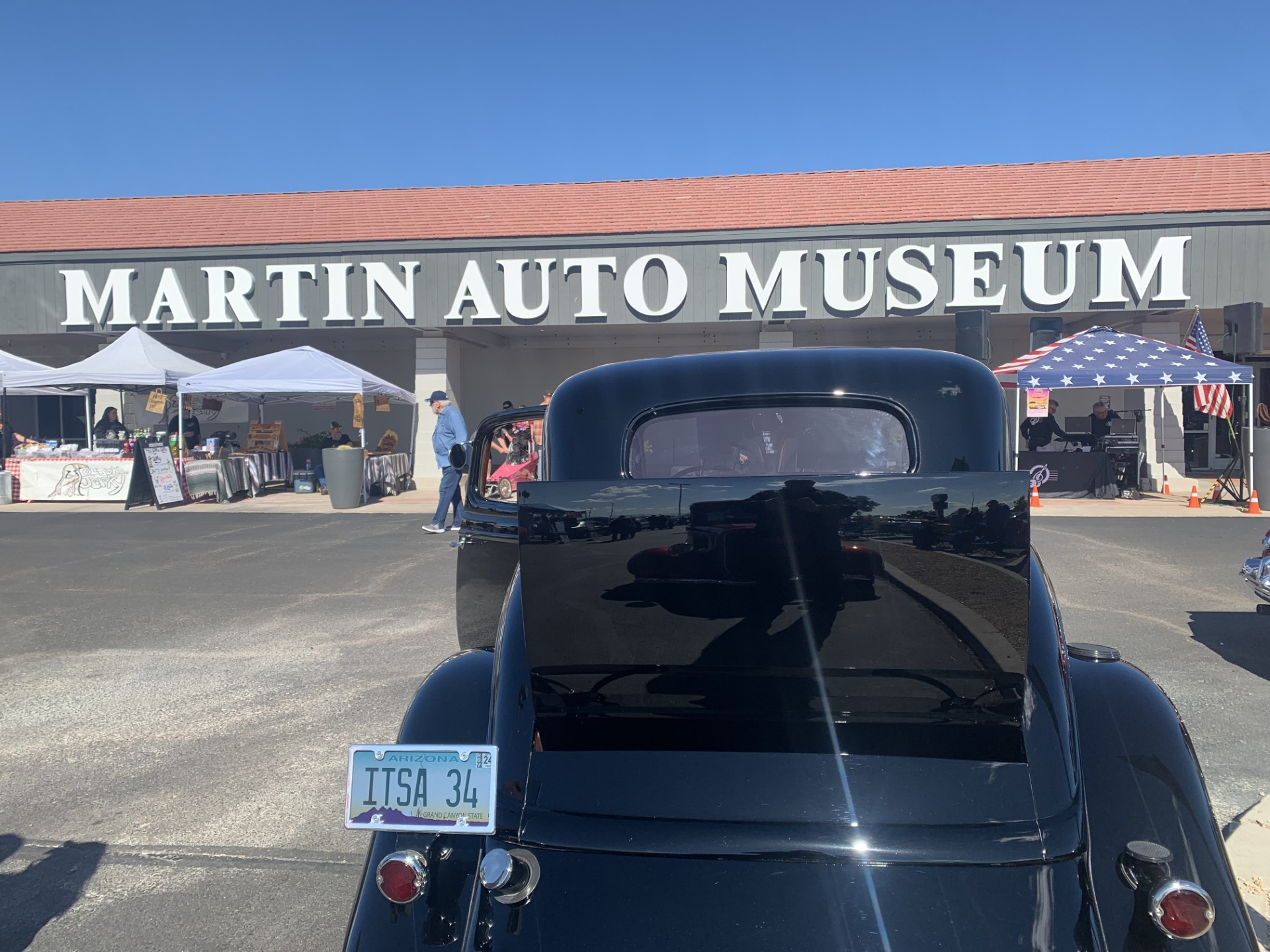
New home to the Martin Auto Museum and Event Center

The museum was founded by real estate developer Mel Martin to showcase his collection of vintage vehicles and automobile related memorabilia. He helped his family to make their house payments by selling newspapers. The family moved to Mayer, Arizona, a mining town, where his great uncle John Martin lived. Martin's father purchased a service station, where he worked pumping gas. He moved to Phoenix and became the owner of his own gas station which he named M&M. He then purchased several towing trucks and his business continued to grow. He became involved in other automobile related businesses and started a car auction company. Martin became involved in the sale and development of commercial real estate.

Martin began collecting cars since the 1960s. During the years his collection of vintage, historical and one of a kind cars continued to grow. He also collected memorabilia related to the automotive industry. Martin and his wife, Sallie Martin, realized that it would be best if they had a building with adequate space to show case their automobile collection and related artifacts.

=== Martin Auto Museum ===
In 2005, Martin organized his vehicles into a private collection and in 2008, he founded the Martin Auto Museum. The museum was originally located in a nondescript commercial building which Martin purchased alongside Interstate 17 on a frontage road in north Phoenix. The majority of the vehicles belong to Martin while a couple belong to the museum's board members.

The museum moved to a much larger location on the northwest 43rd Avenue and Thunderbird Road in early 2022. It now houses a collection of over 175 vehicles, as well as a full-size event center available to book. Each vehicle has a display which provides the visitor with the basic information of the vehicle in question. The information provided on the display includes the year, make, model, etc. of the vehicle.

There are various types of vehicles on display. Some are pre-1950 historical vintage cars and others are classic cars of the post 1950s era. Some are unique because of their low mileage and have a special-interest value. The museum also has a collection of automobile related memorabilia and a vintage carousel.

The oldest vehicle on display in the museum is an 1886 Benz Patent-Motorwagen. Other vehicles of note on exhibit are the following:

- A 1948 Tucker
- A 1965 Dodge Coronet A/FX Race car
- A 1917 Douglas Dump Truck
- A 1922 Chevrolet Boattail Race car
- A 1929 Cadillac Dual Cowl Phaeton which was featured in "Arizona's Concours d'Elegence"
- A 1930 convertible Duesenberg "J" Boattail Speedster which once belonged to gangster John Factor, an associate of Al Capone
- A 1954 custom built Oldsmobile with a 1954 Cadillac rear. The car was built for the 1977 movie "The Late Show" starring Art Carney and Lily Tomlin
- A 1959 AC Bristol, 1 of 21 built
- The 1963 Chrysler 300 pace setter used in the 47th Indianapolis 500.
- A 1965 Shelby Cobra, once owned by Carroll Shelby. The vehicle's dashboard was autographed by Shelby
- A 1990 Ford driven in NASCAR by Jeff Gordon
- A 1992 Lister Corvette which is 1 of 3 concept cars built
- A 2000 Pontiac Bonneville which set a 204 mph (328 km/h) world record for a front wheel drive sedan

Also, among the vehicles exhibited is a 1940 McCormick Farmall Tractor and a 1948 American Flyer Whizzer Powered Motor Bike.

== Museum Gallery ==
The following are photographs of some of the vehicles exhibited in the Martin Auto Museum. Also, pictured are some of the artifacts in the museum.

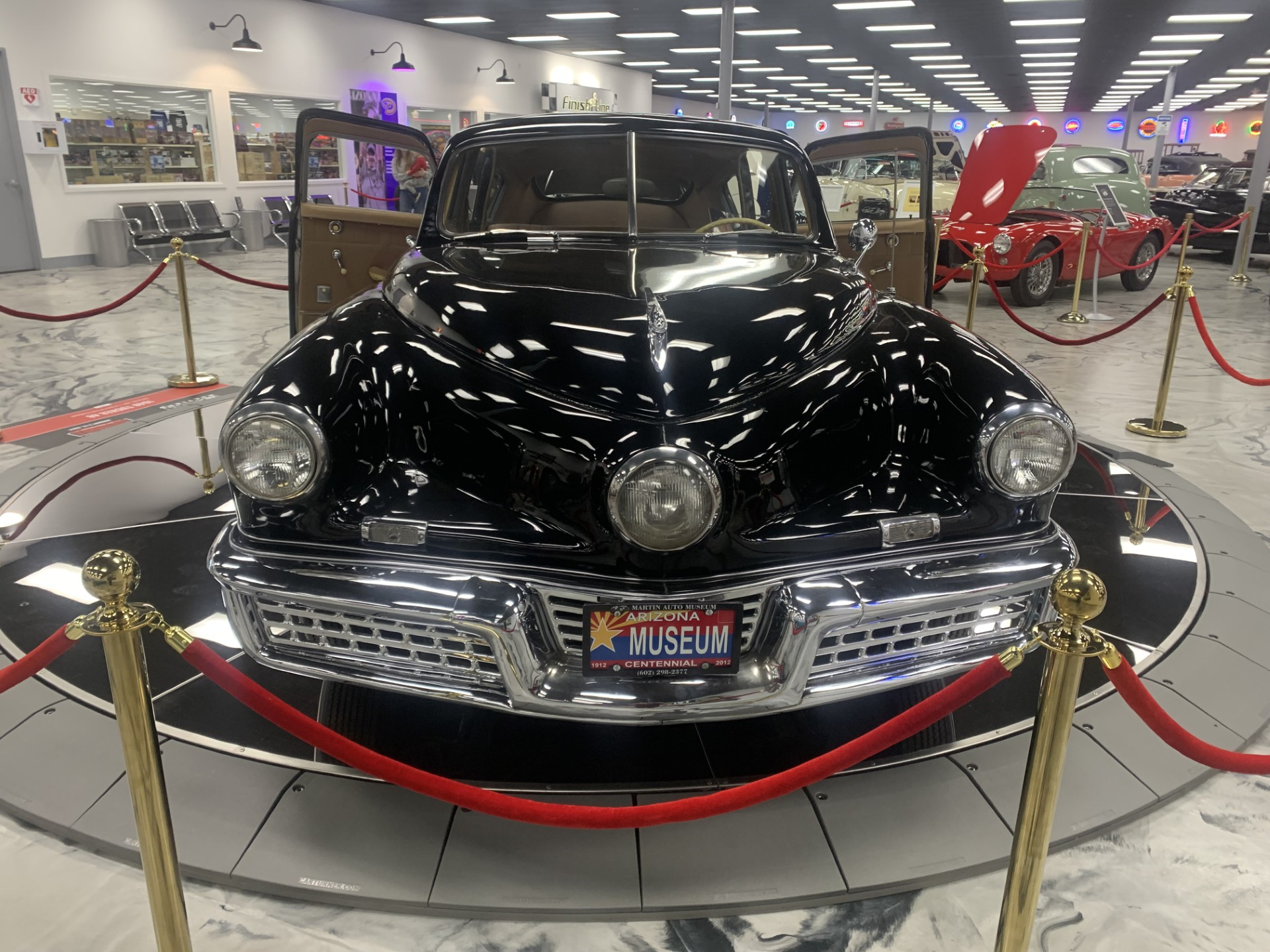
1948 Tucker

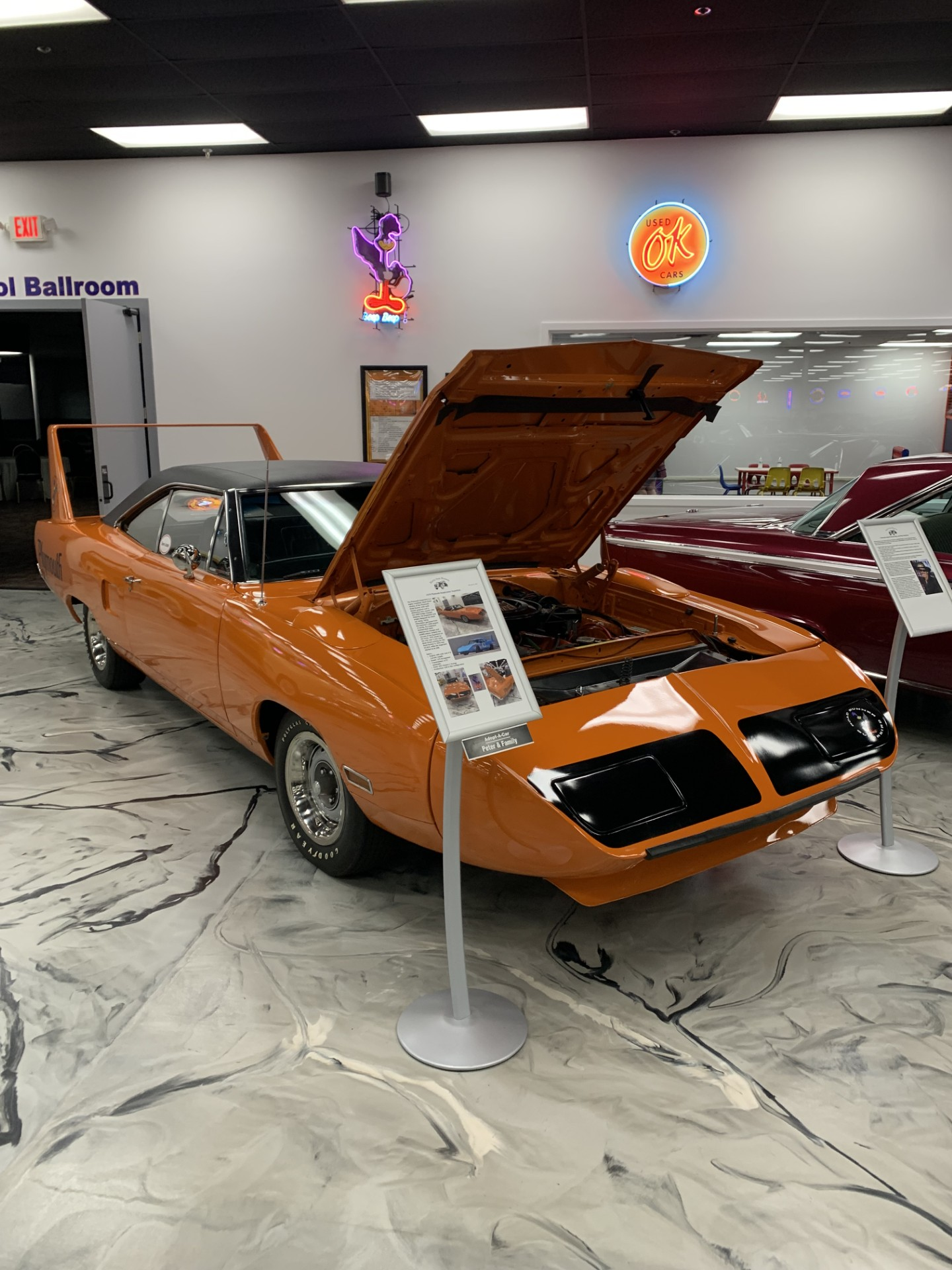
1970 Plymouth Superbird 440cid

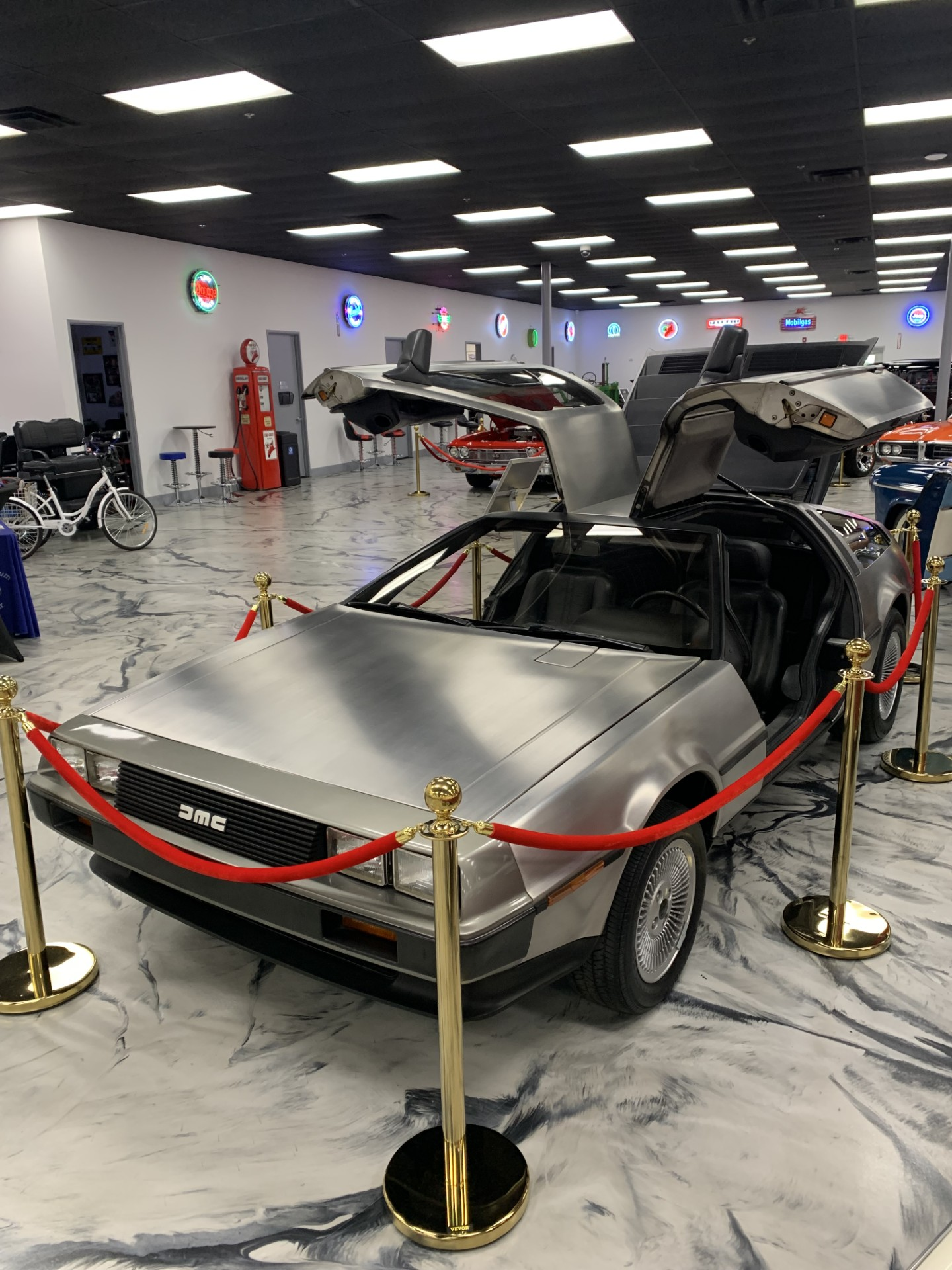
DMC Delorean

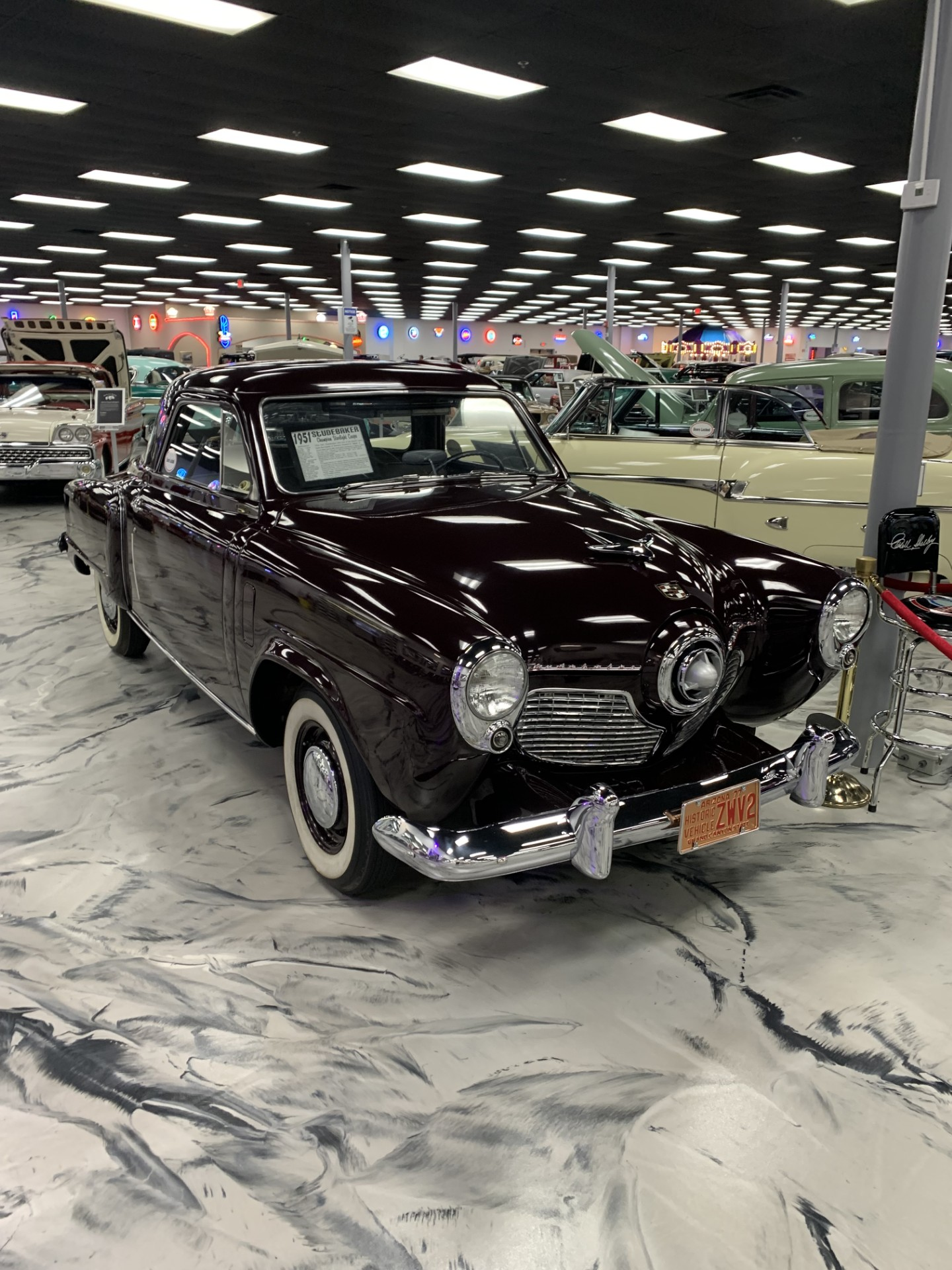
1951 Studebaker

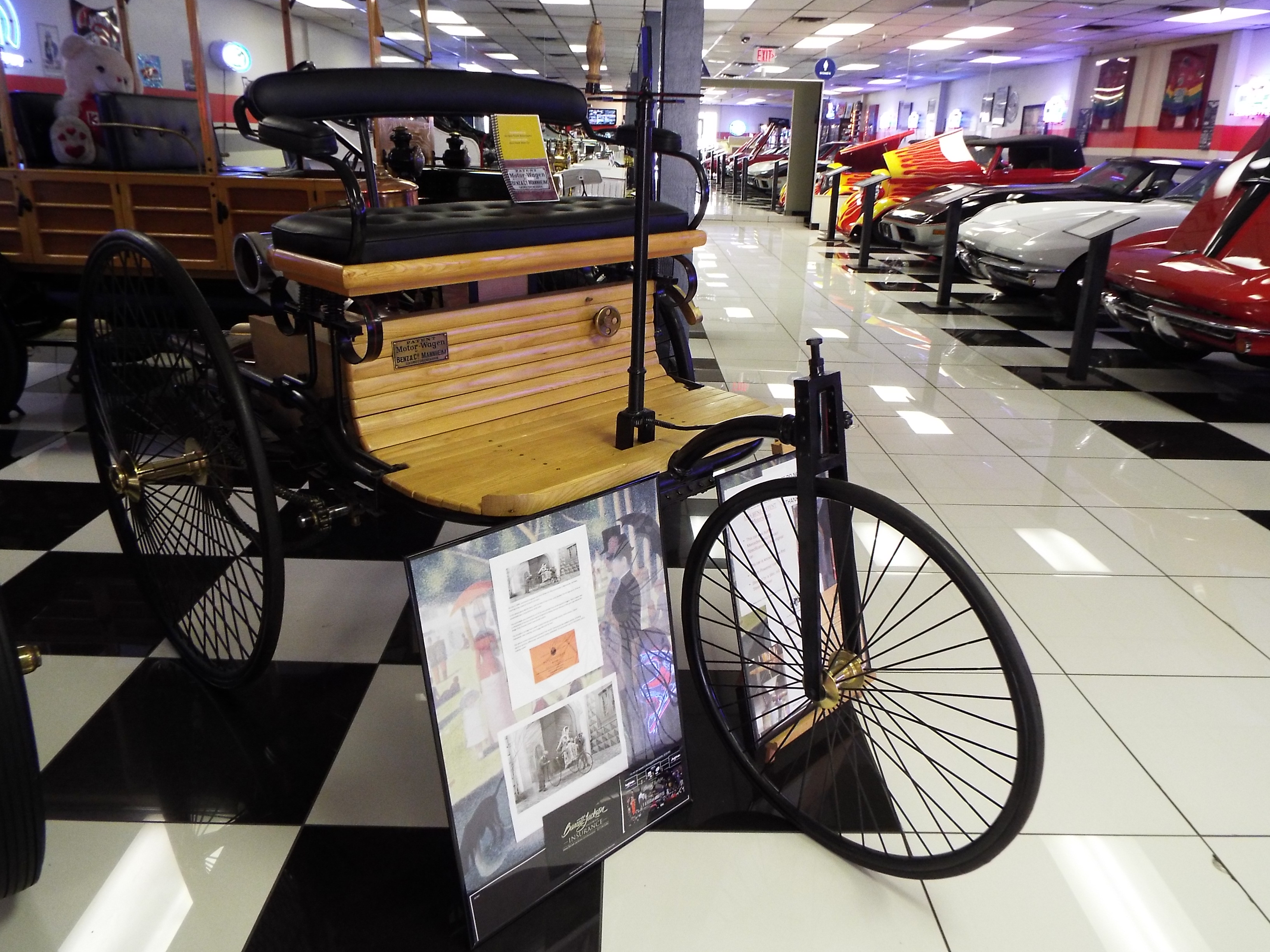
1886 Benz Patent-Motorwagen

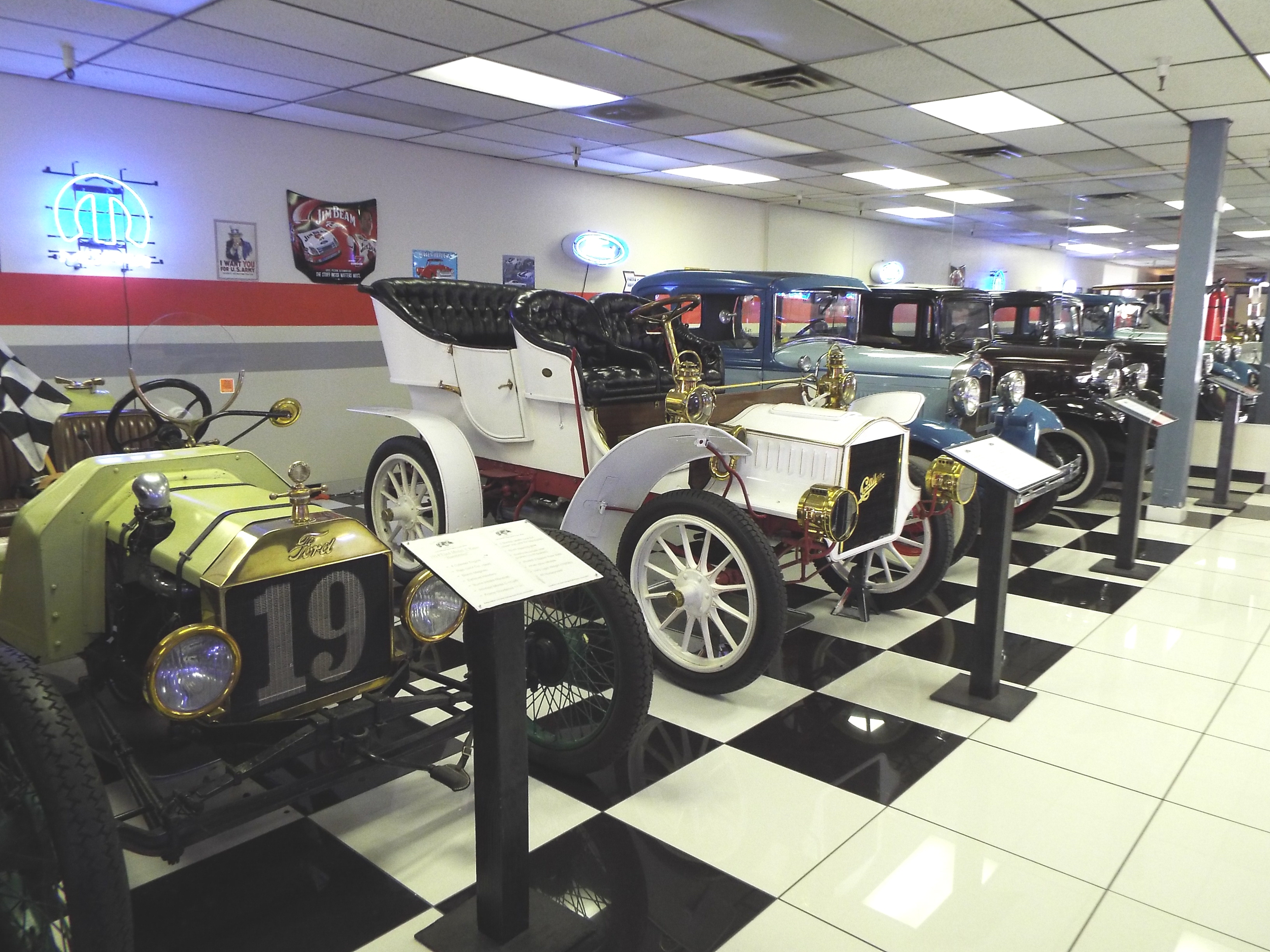
Exhibit of pre-1950s vehicles

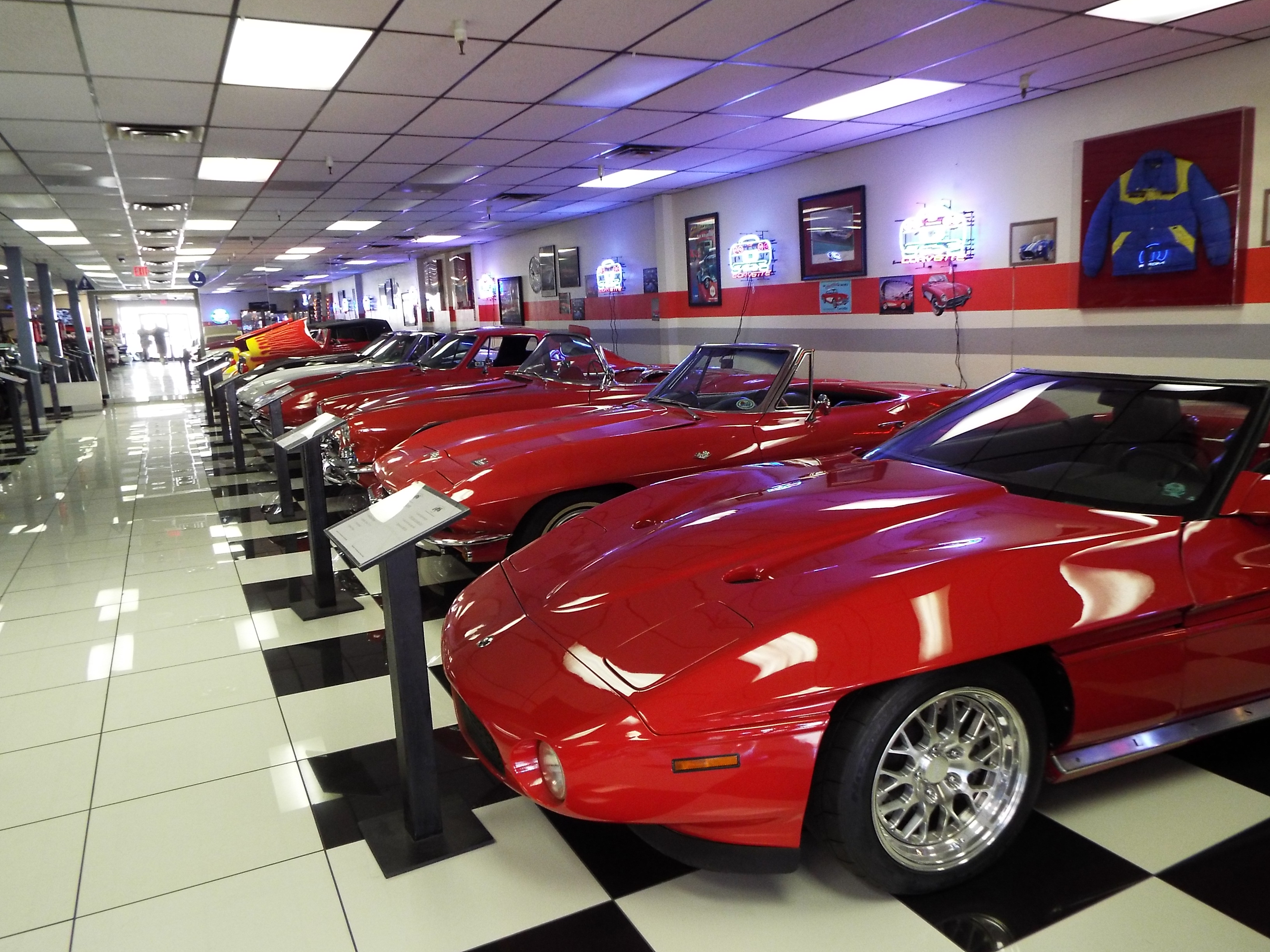
Exhibit of post 1950 vehicles

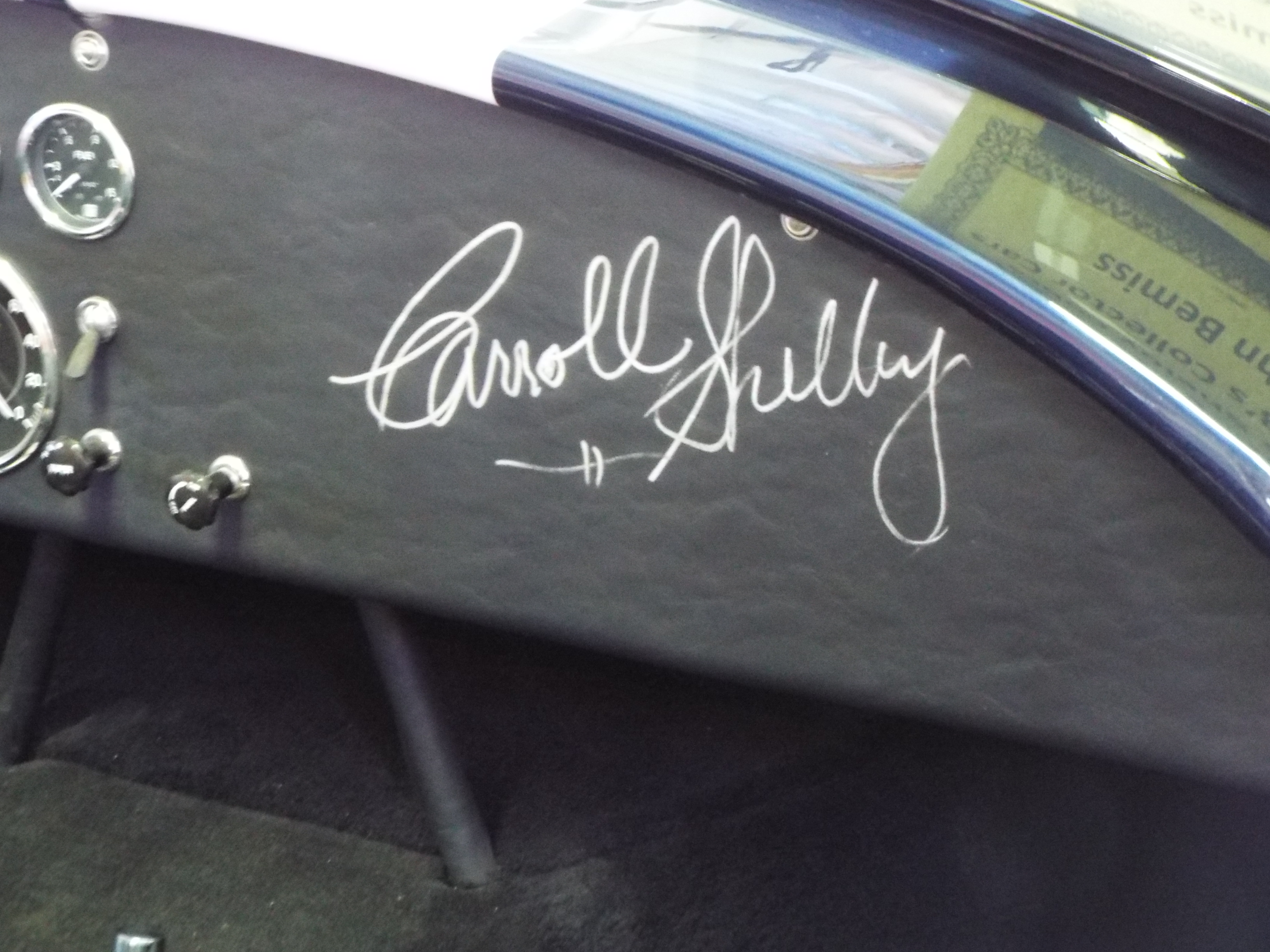
1965 Shelby Cobra dashboard autographed by Carroll Shelby

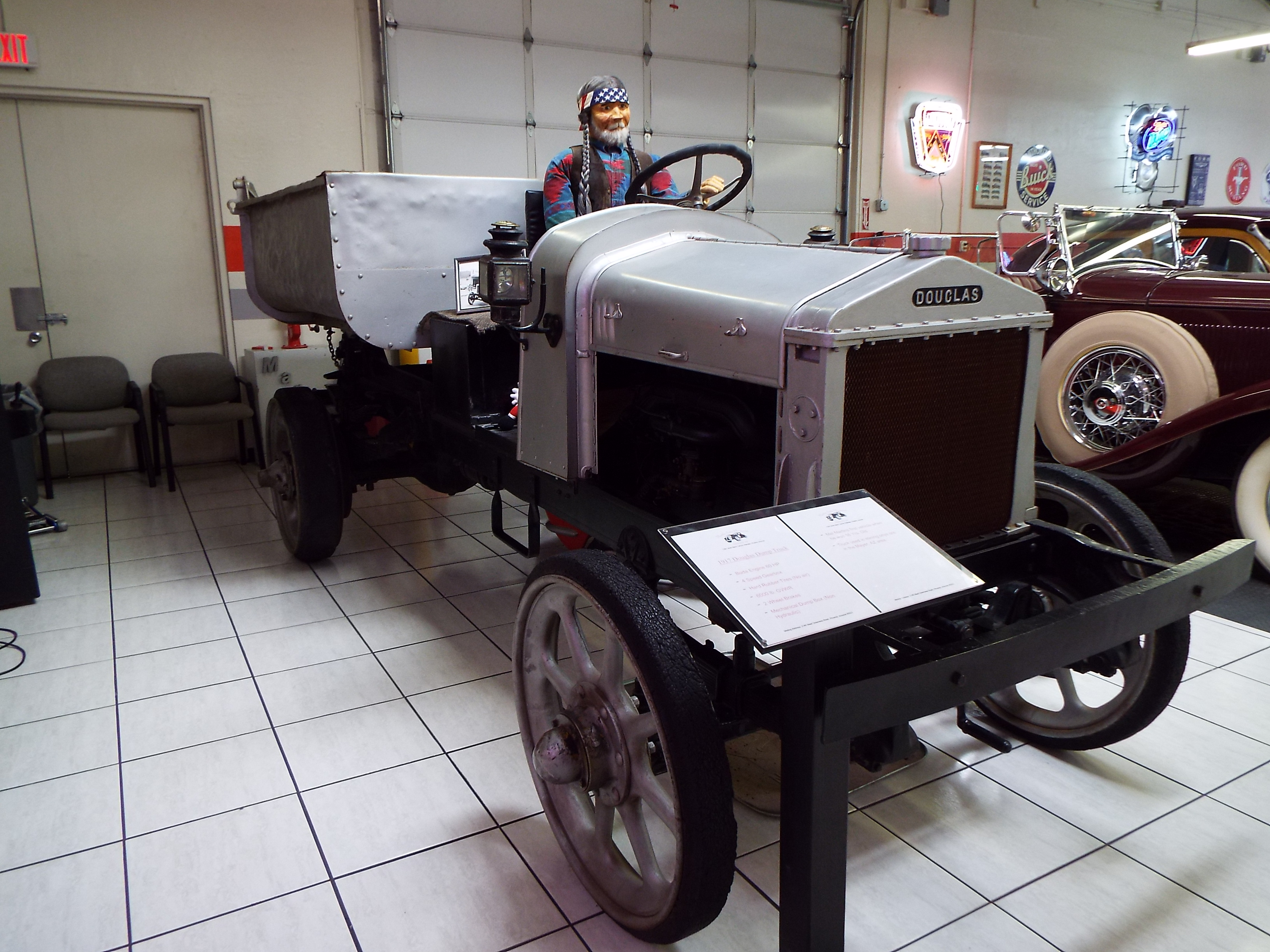
1917 Douglas Dump Truck.

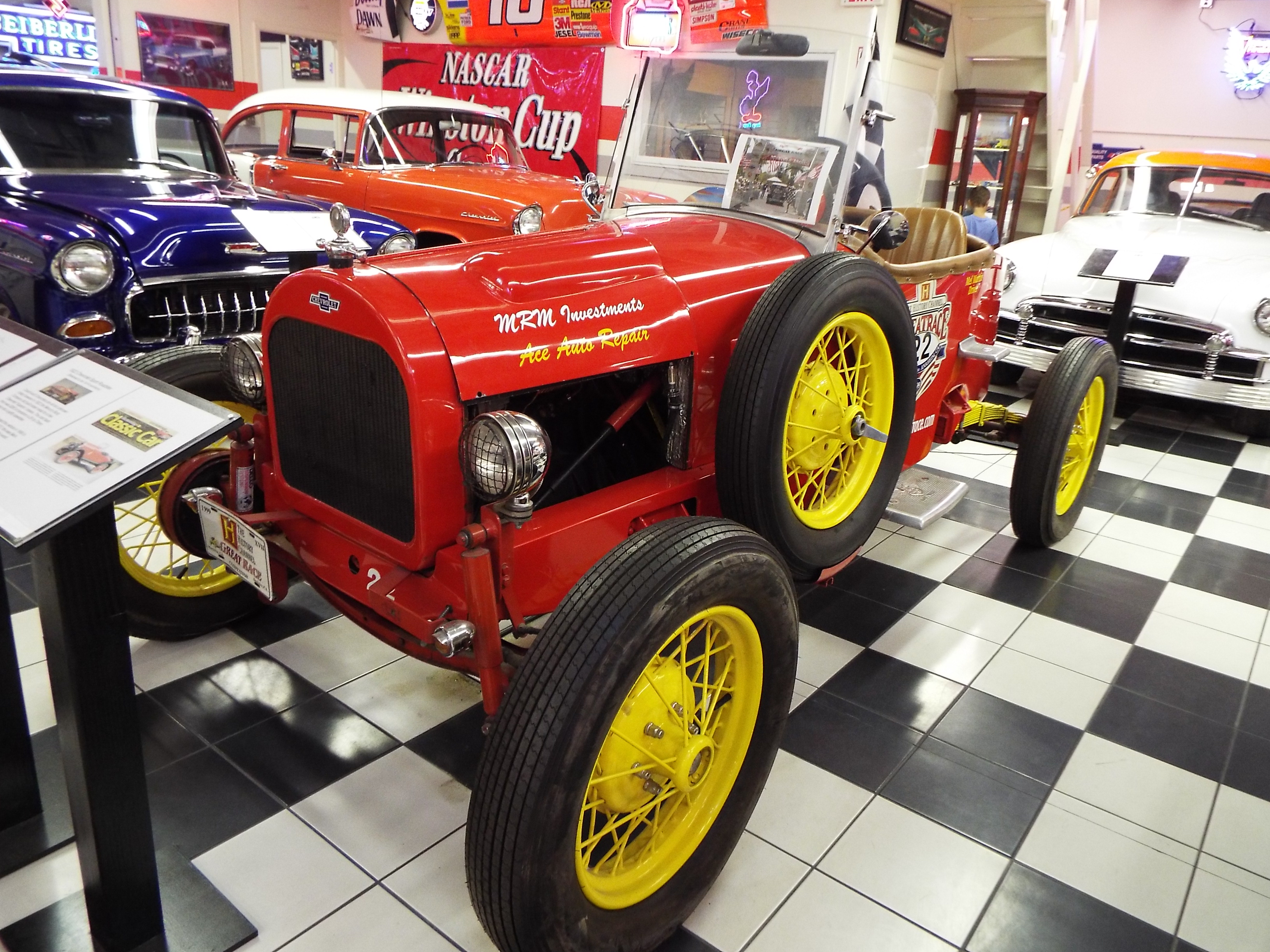
1922 Chevrolet Boattail Race Car.

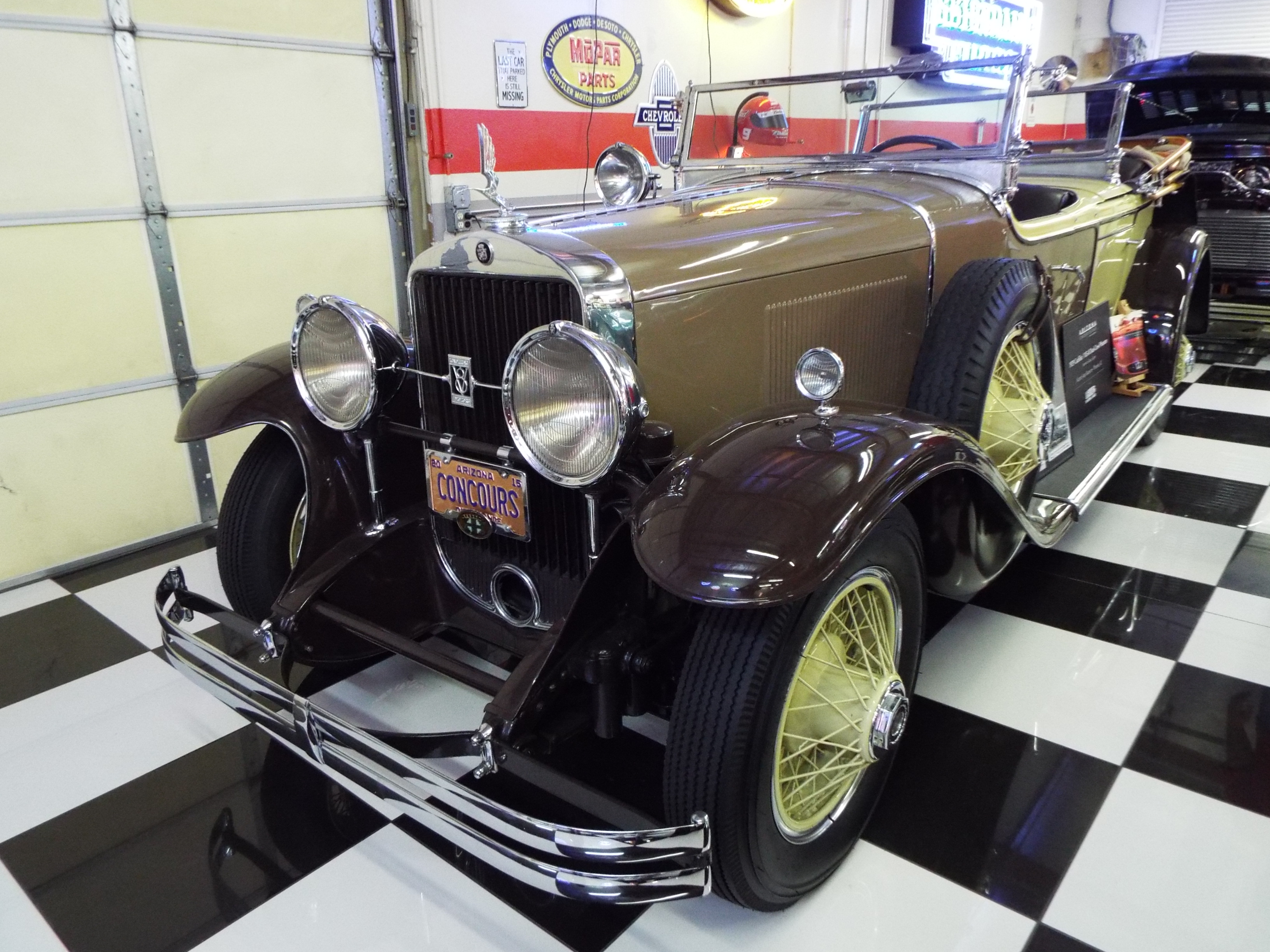
1929 Cadillac Dual Cowl Phaeton.

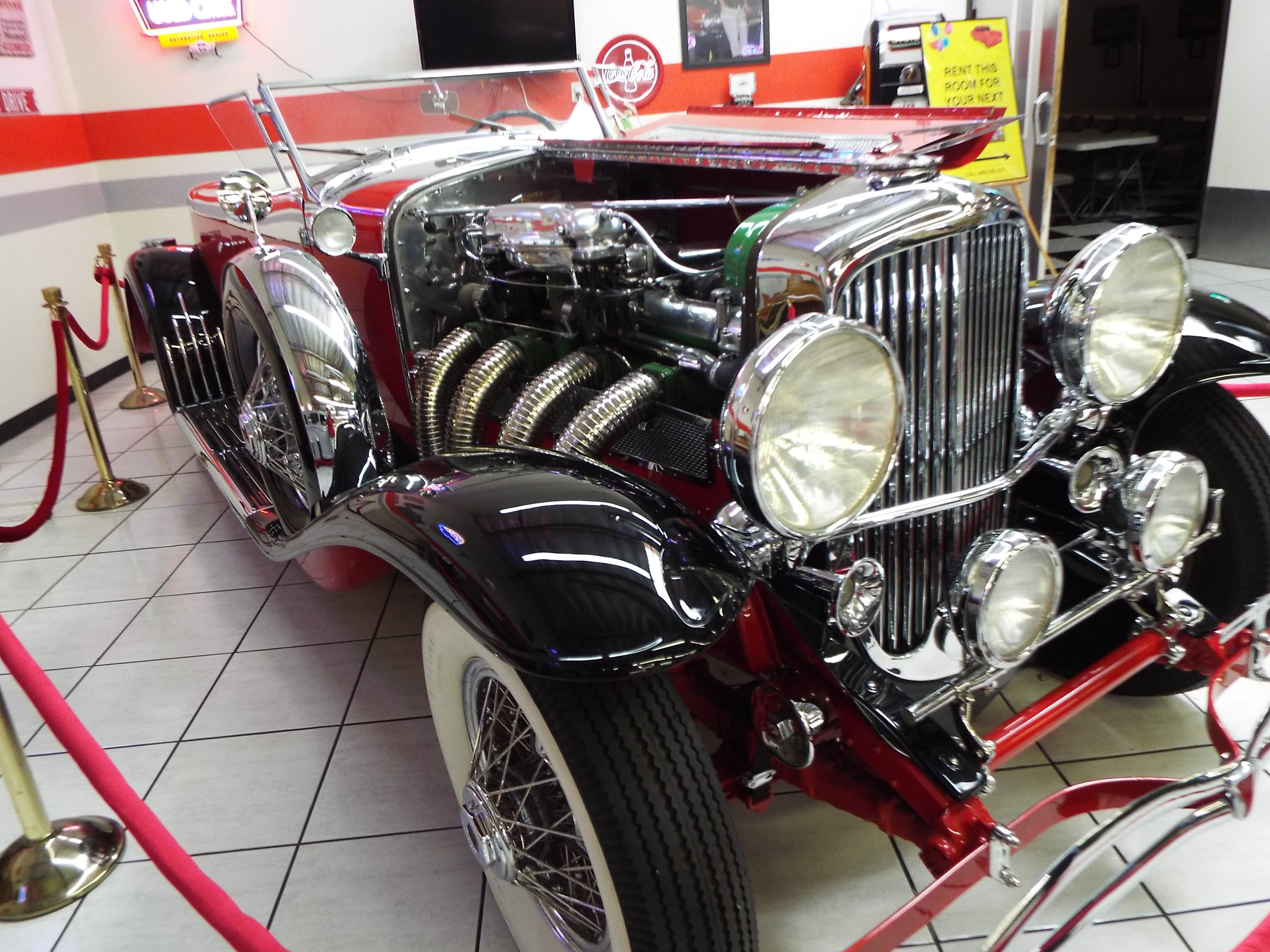
1930 Duesenberg "J" Boattail Speedster.

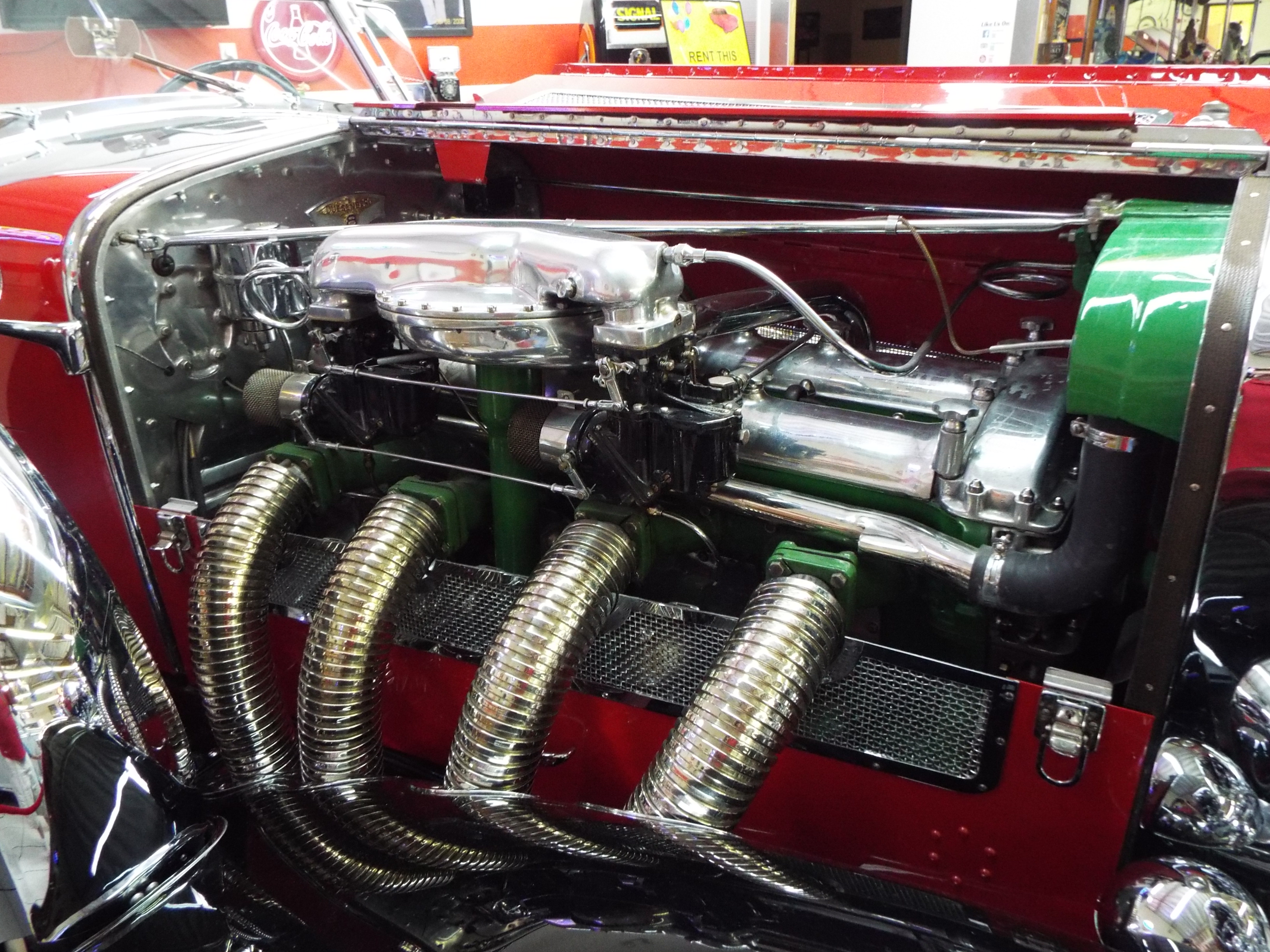
The straight-8 engine configuration with 265 horsepower engine of the 1930 Duesenberg "J" Boattail Speedster.

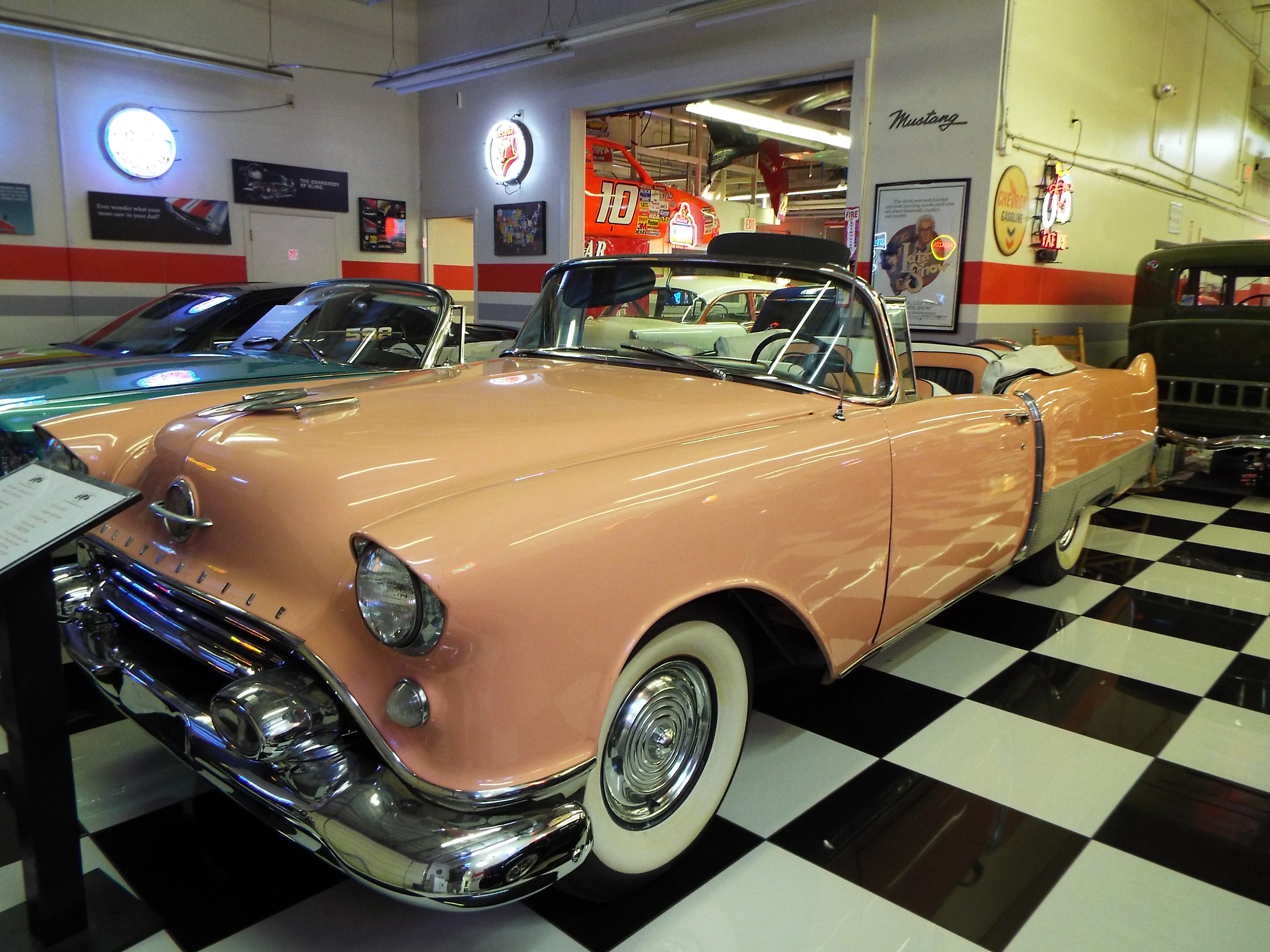
1954 Custom built Oldsmobile-Cadillac

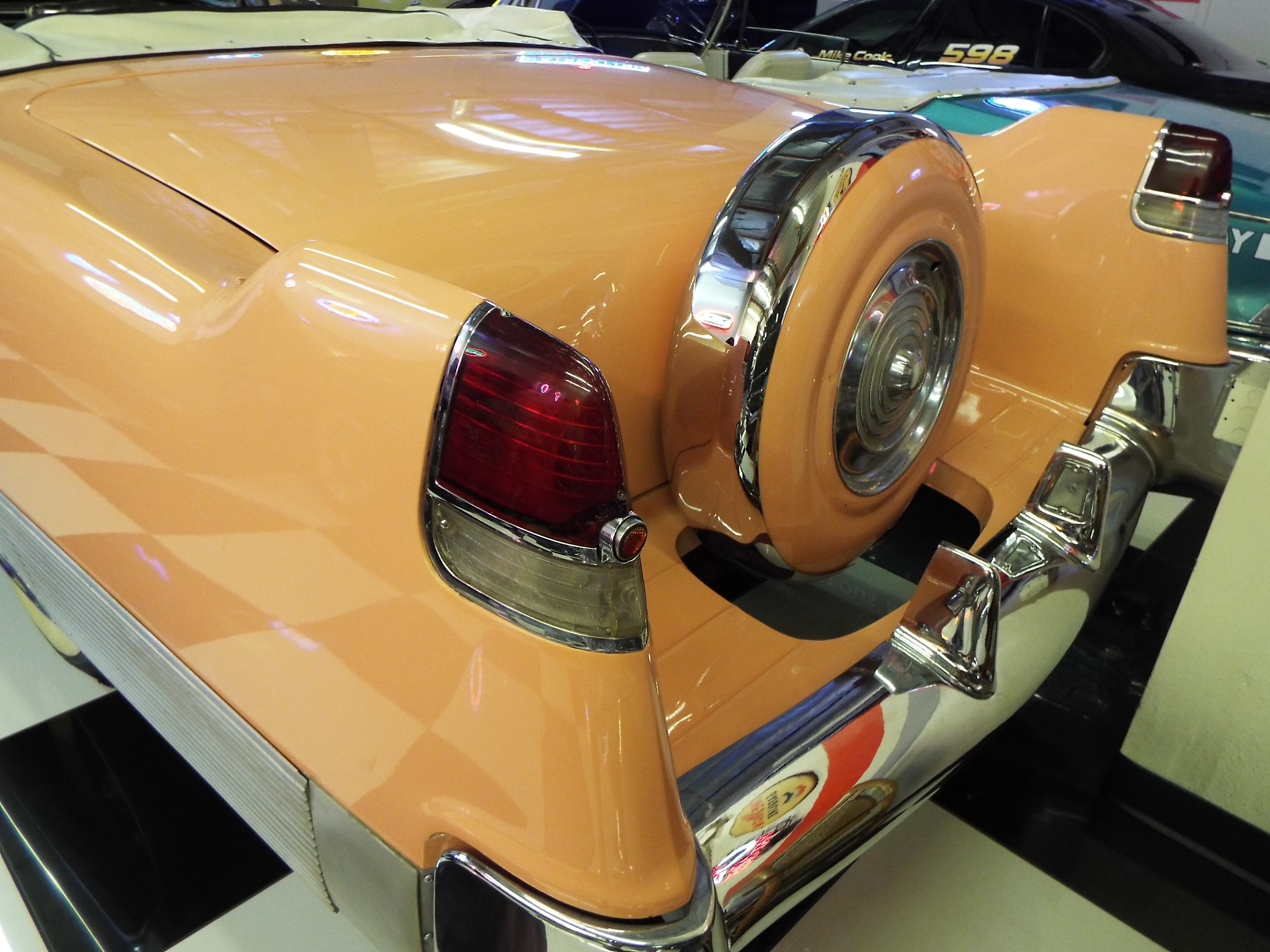
The Cadillac rear of the 1954 custom built Oldsmobile-Cadillac

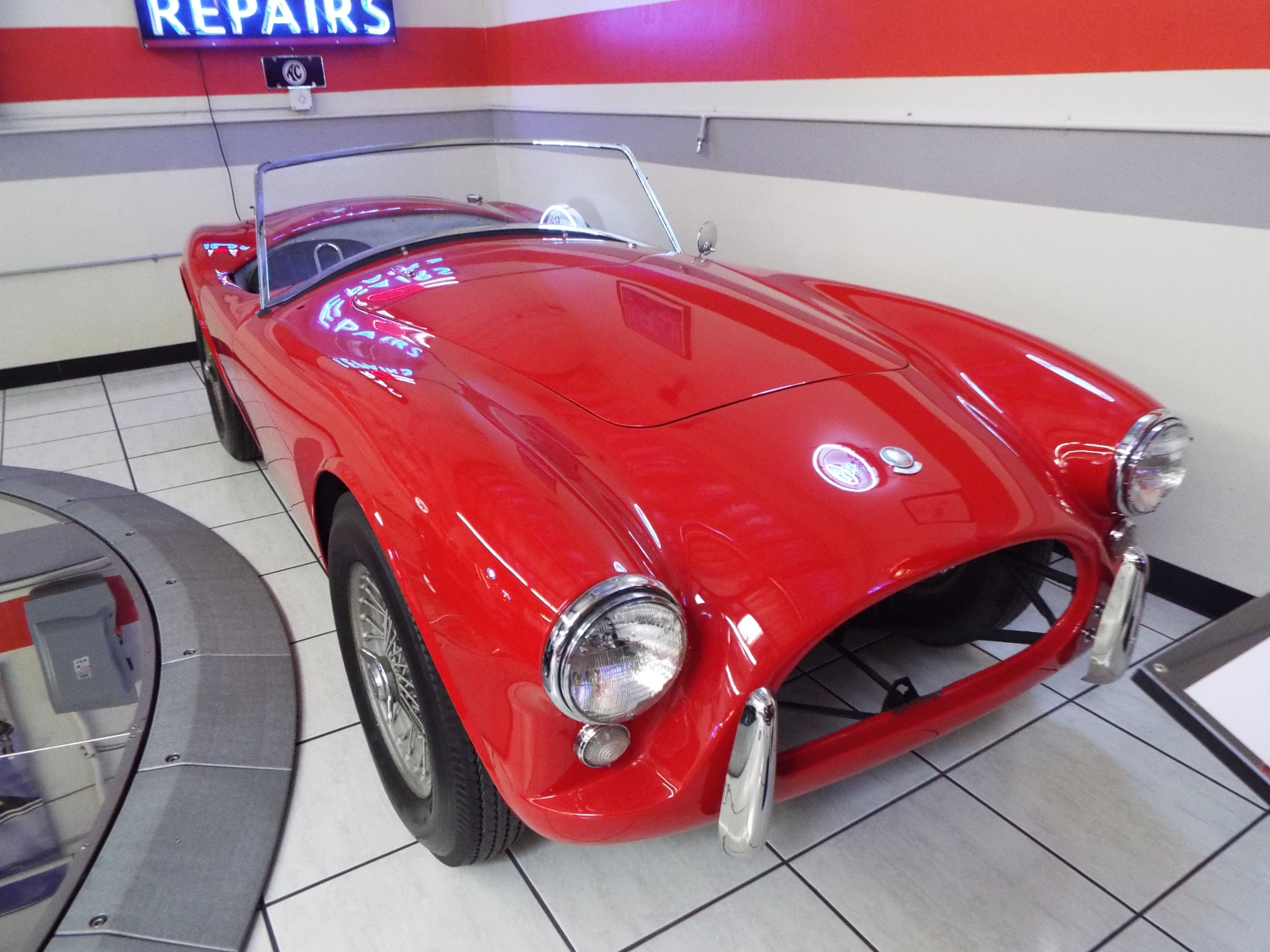
1959 AC Bristol Roadster

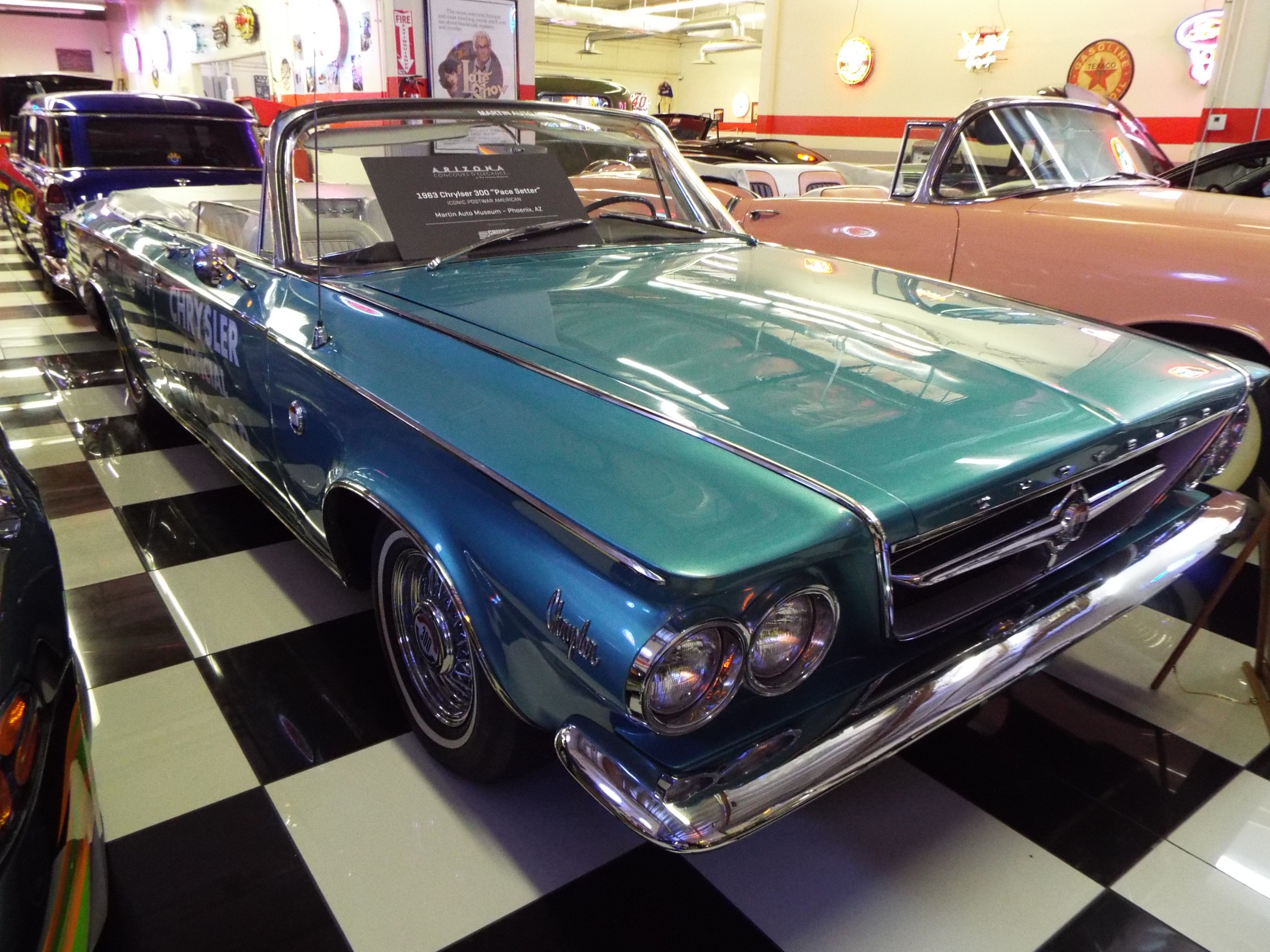
1963 Chrysler 300 pace setter used in the 47th Indianapolis 500

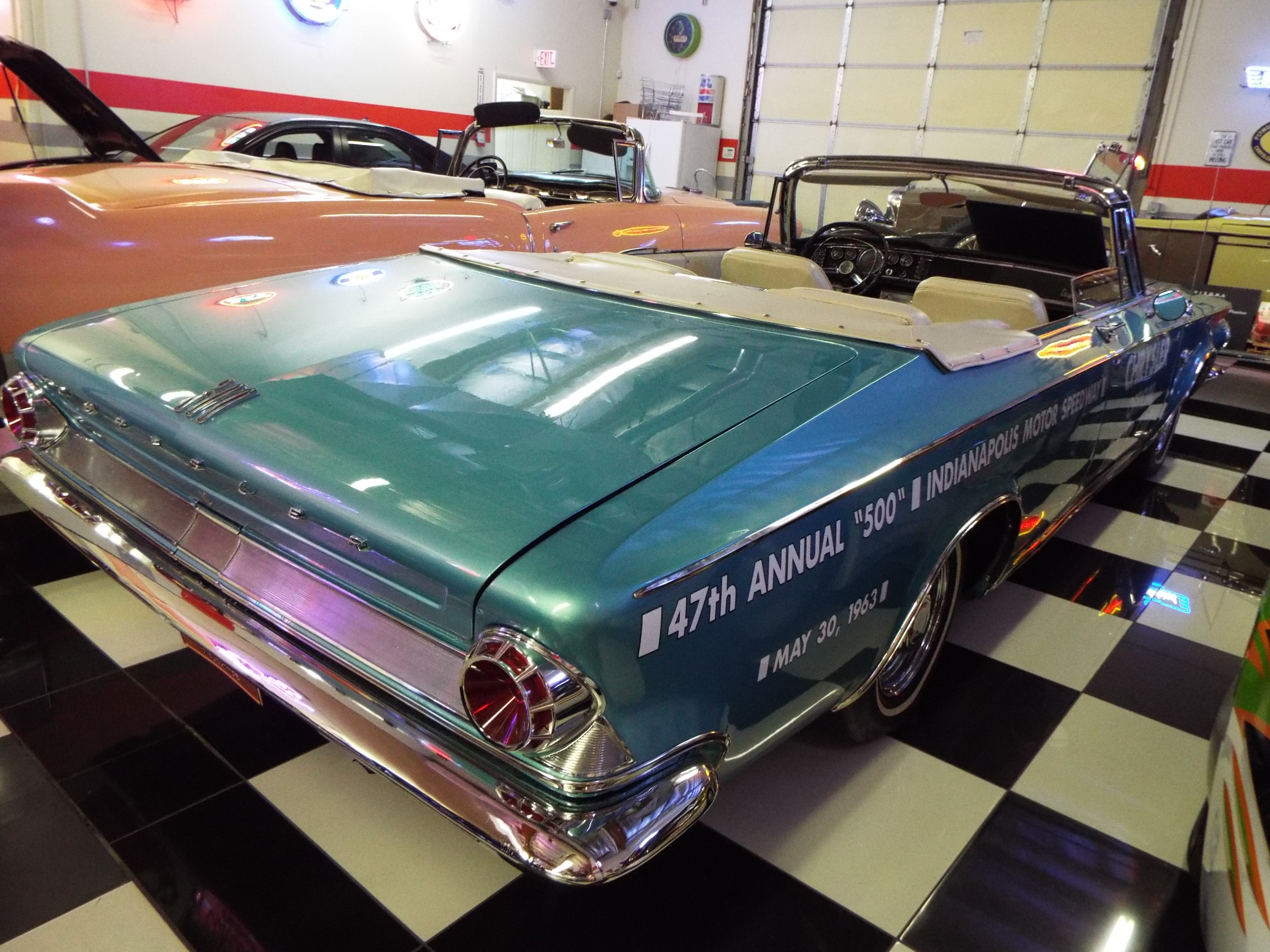
Different view of the 1963 Chrysler 300 pace setter

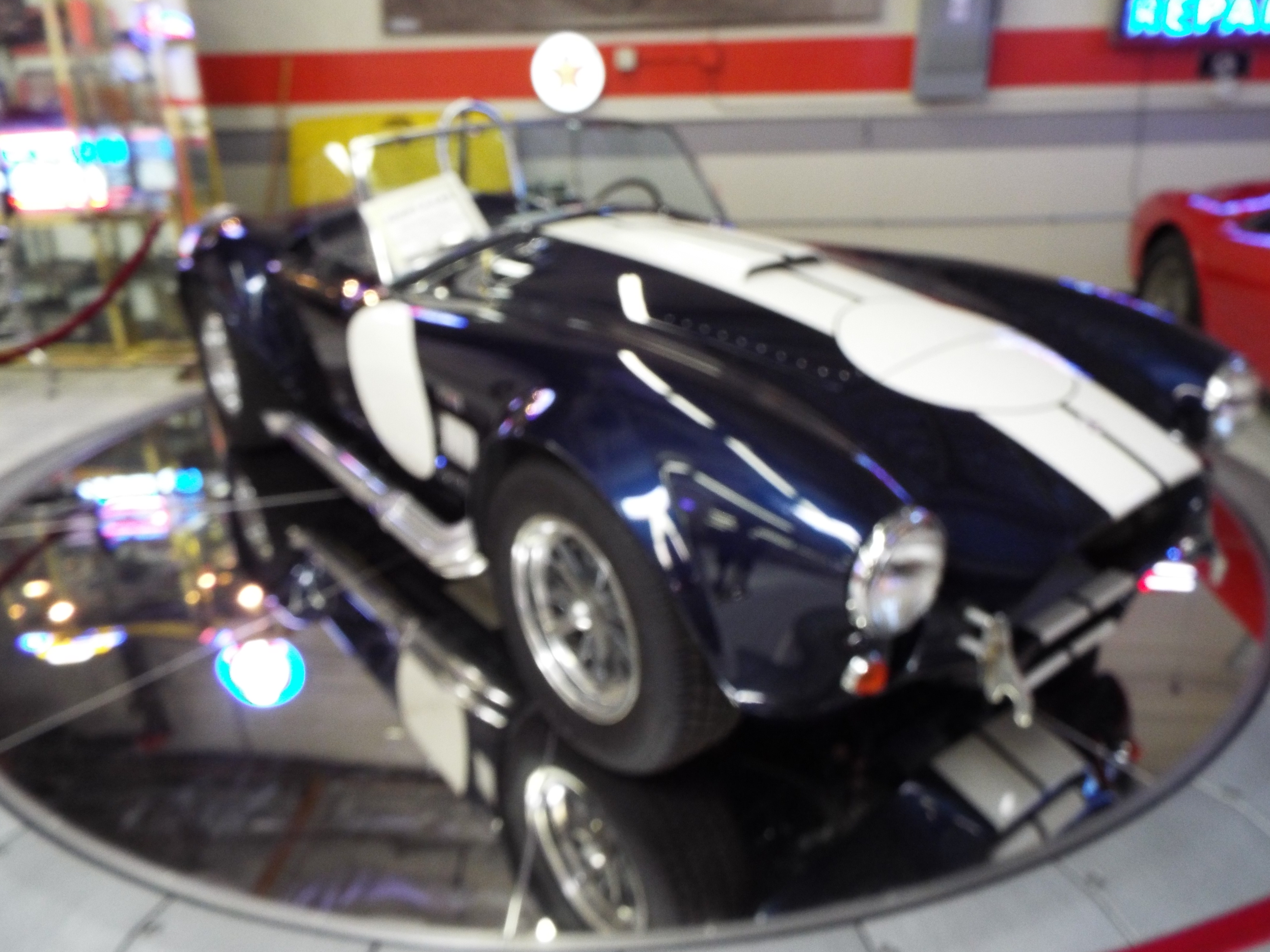
1965 Shelby AC Cobra

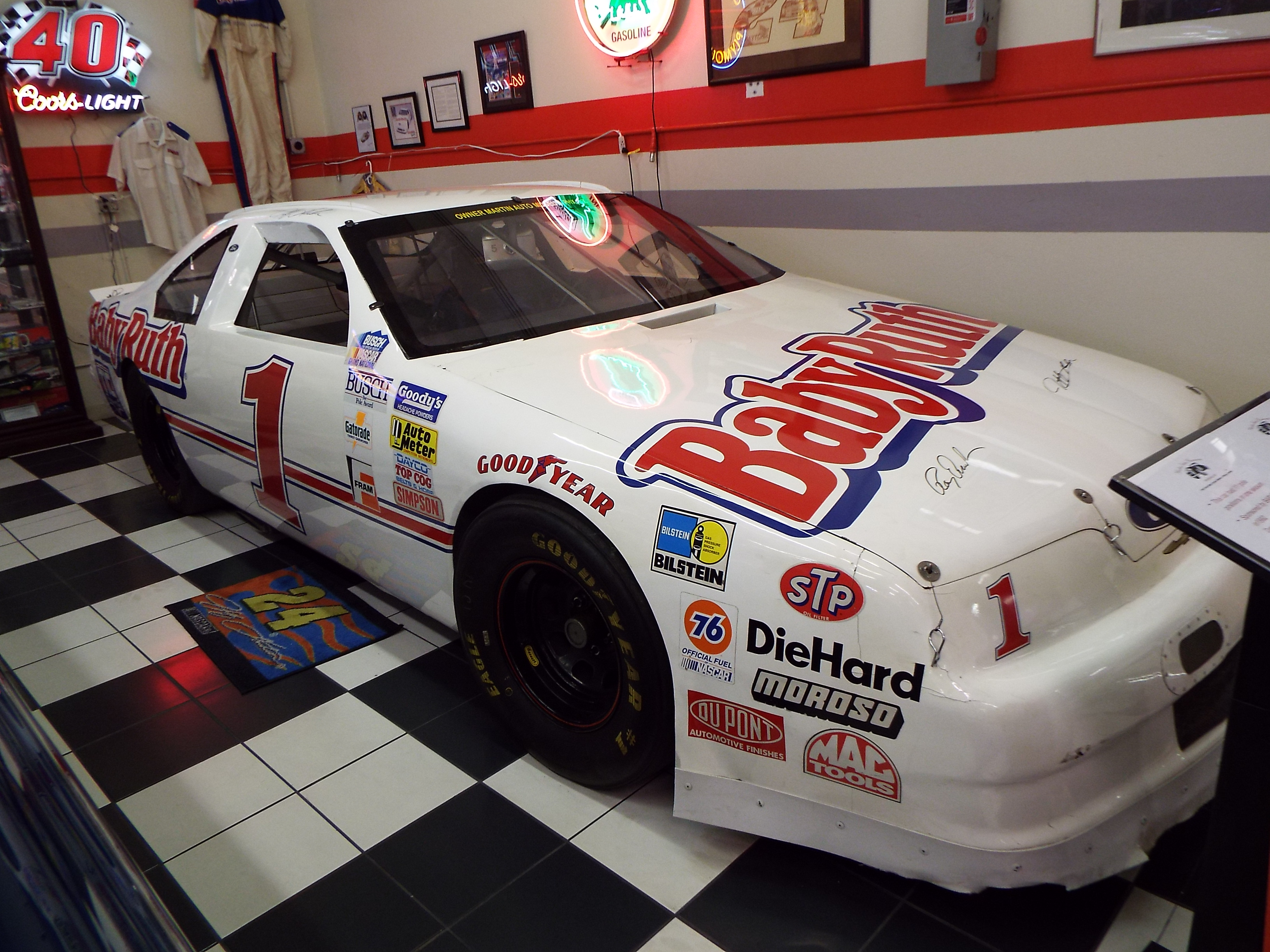
1990 Jeff Gordon's Ford NASCAR Race Car

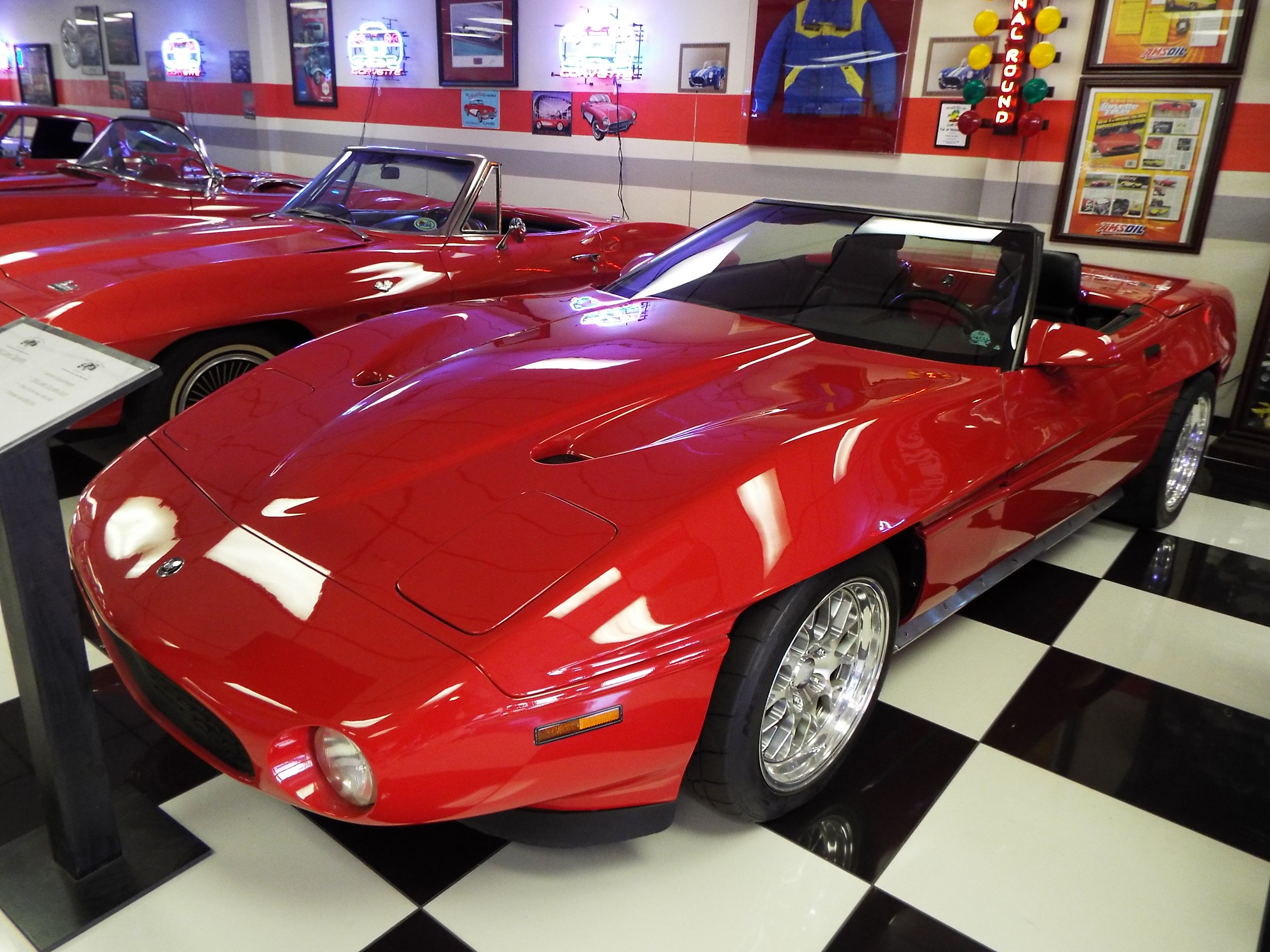
1992 Lister Corvette

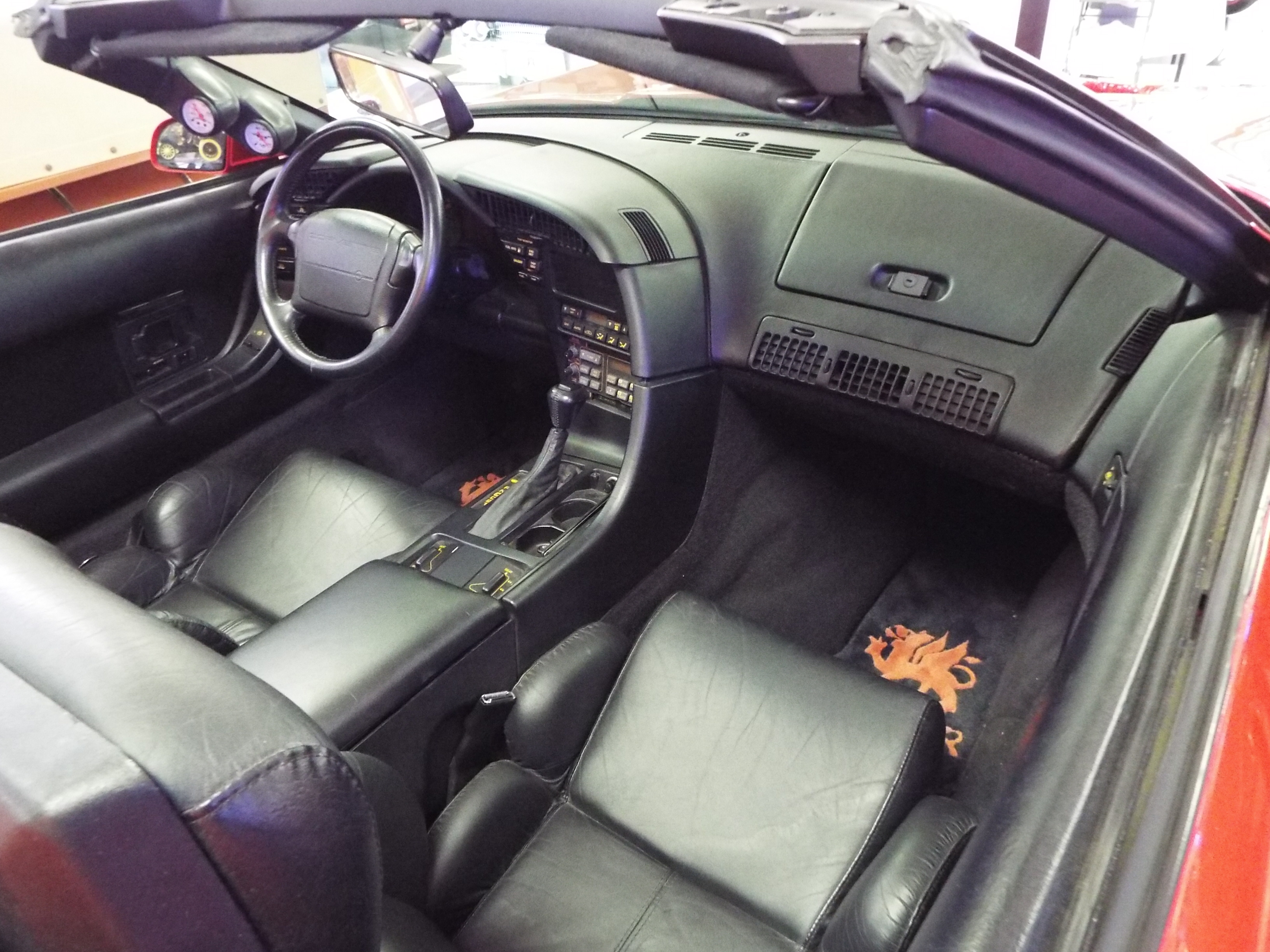
The dashboard and interior of the 1992 Lister Corvette.

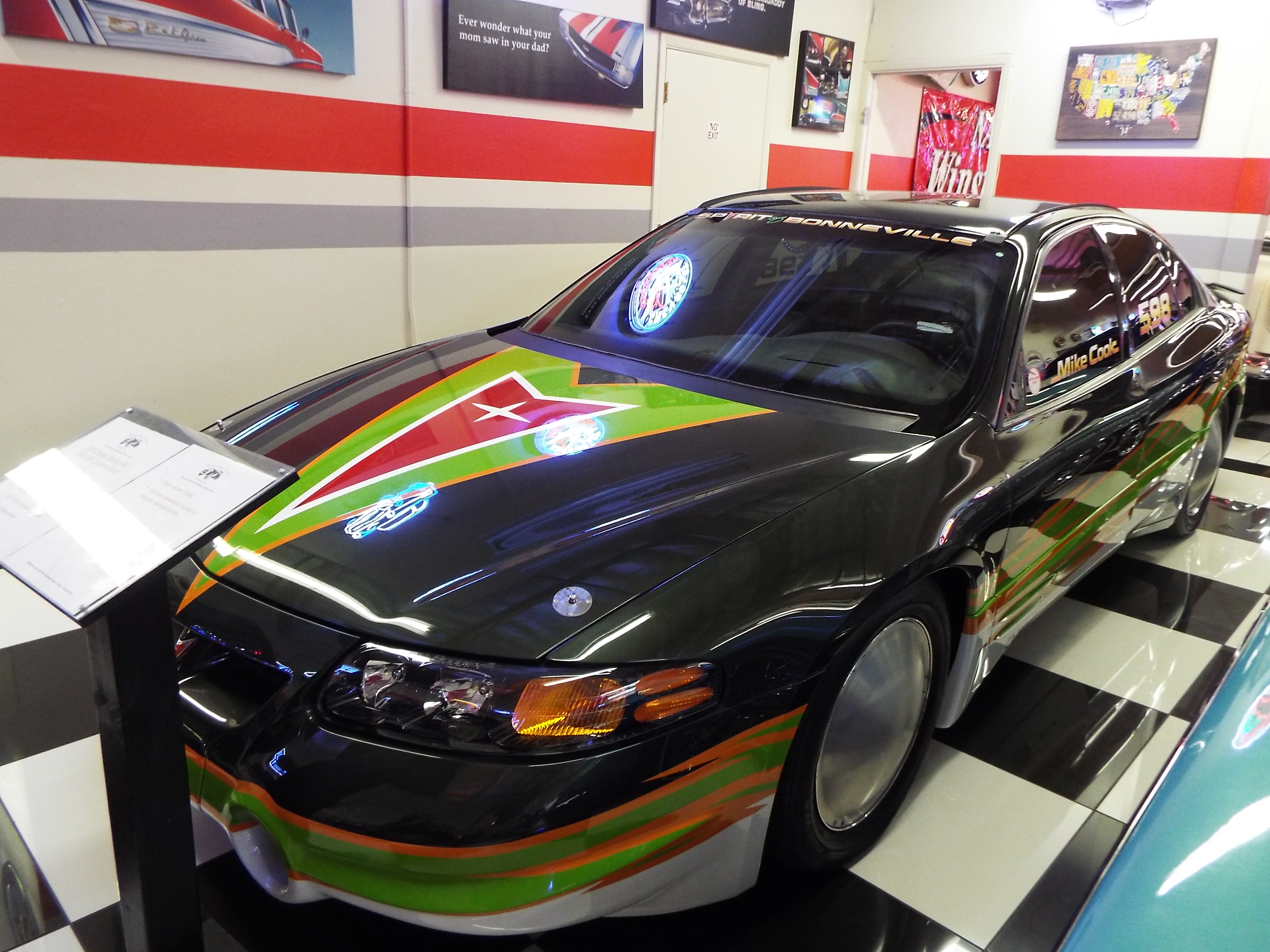
2000 Pontiac Bonneville Salt Flats Custom Racer.

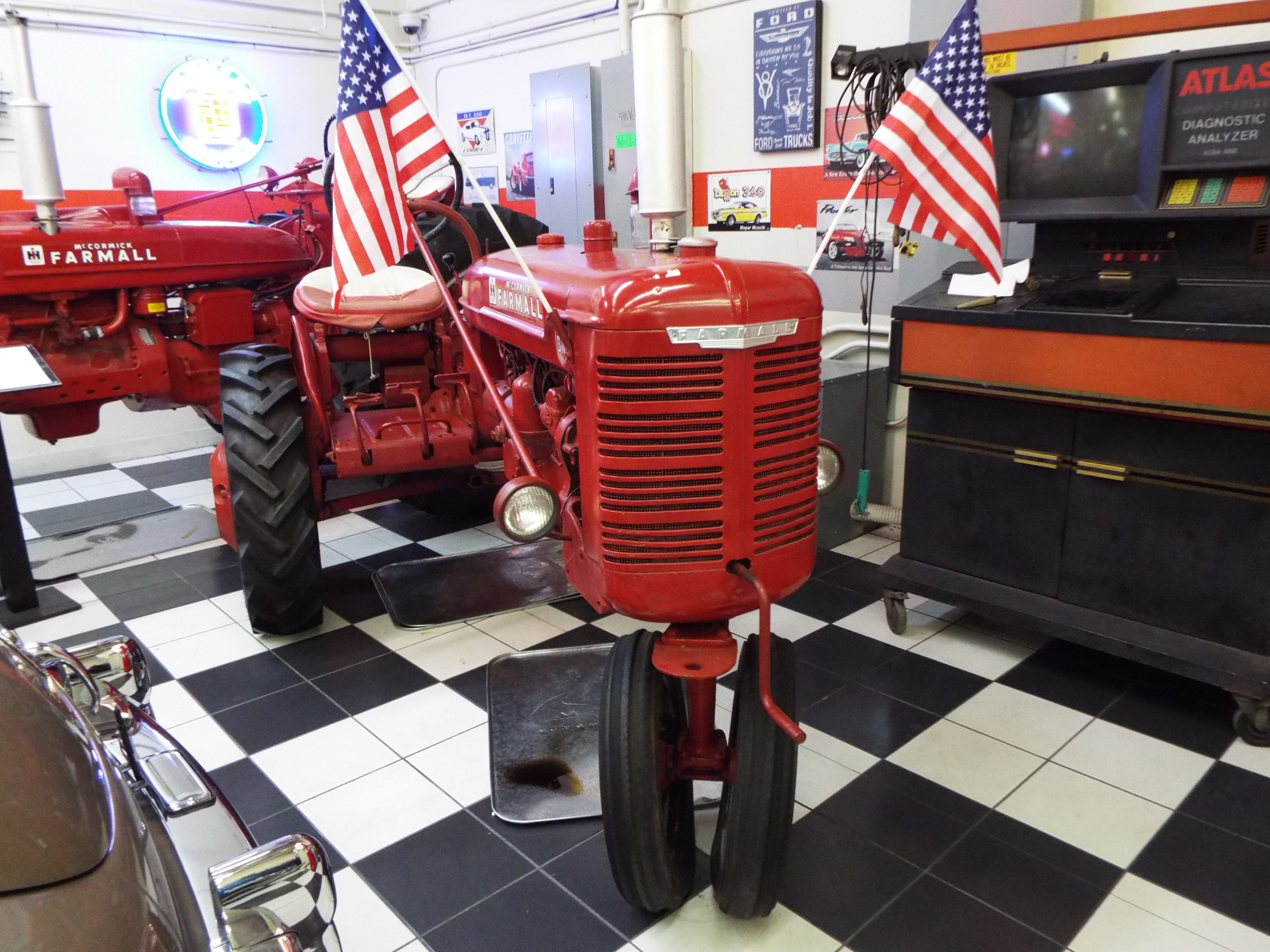
1940 McCormick Farmall Tractor.

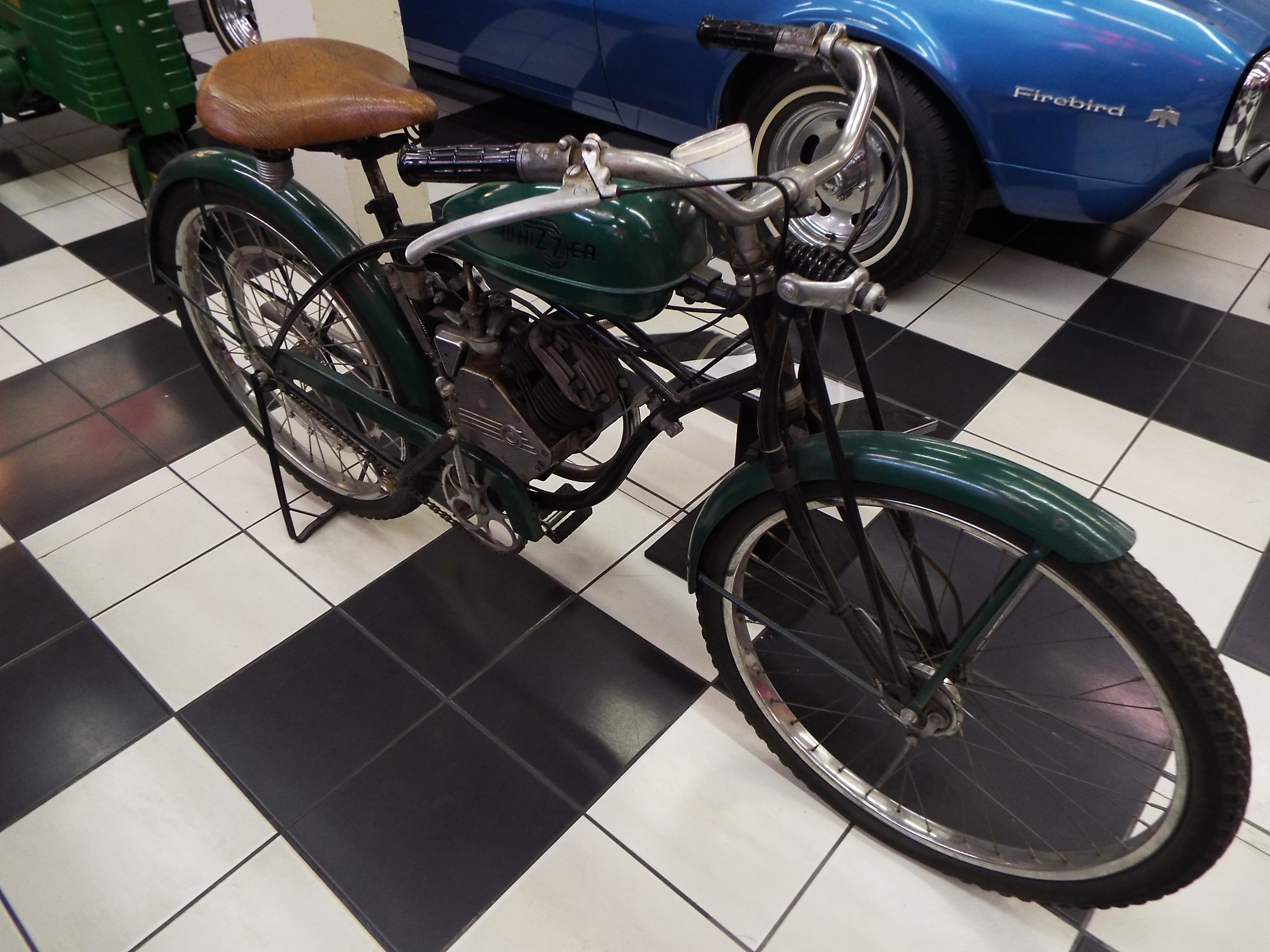
1948 American Flyer Whizzer Powered Motor Bike.

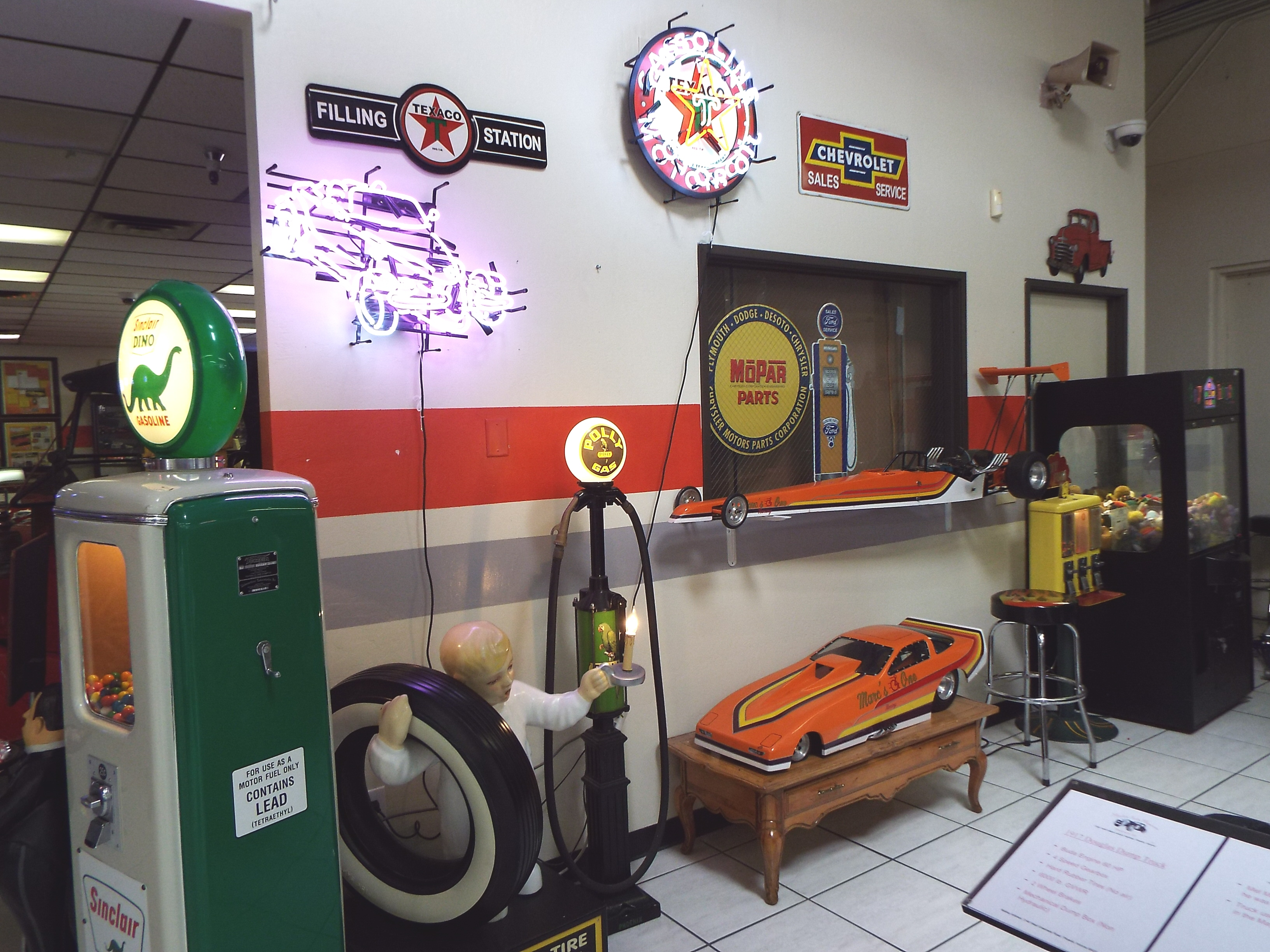
Automobile industry related artifacts.

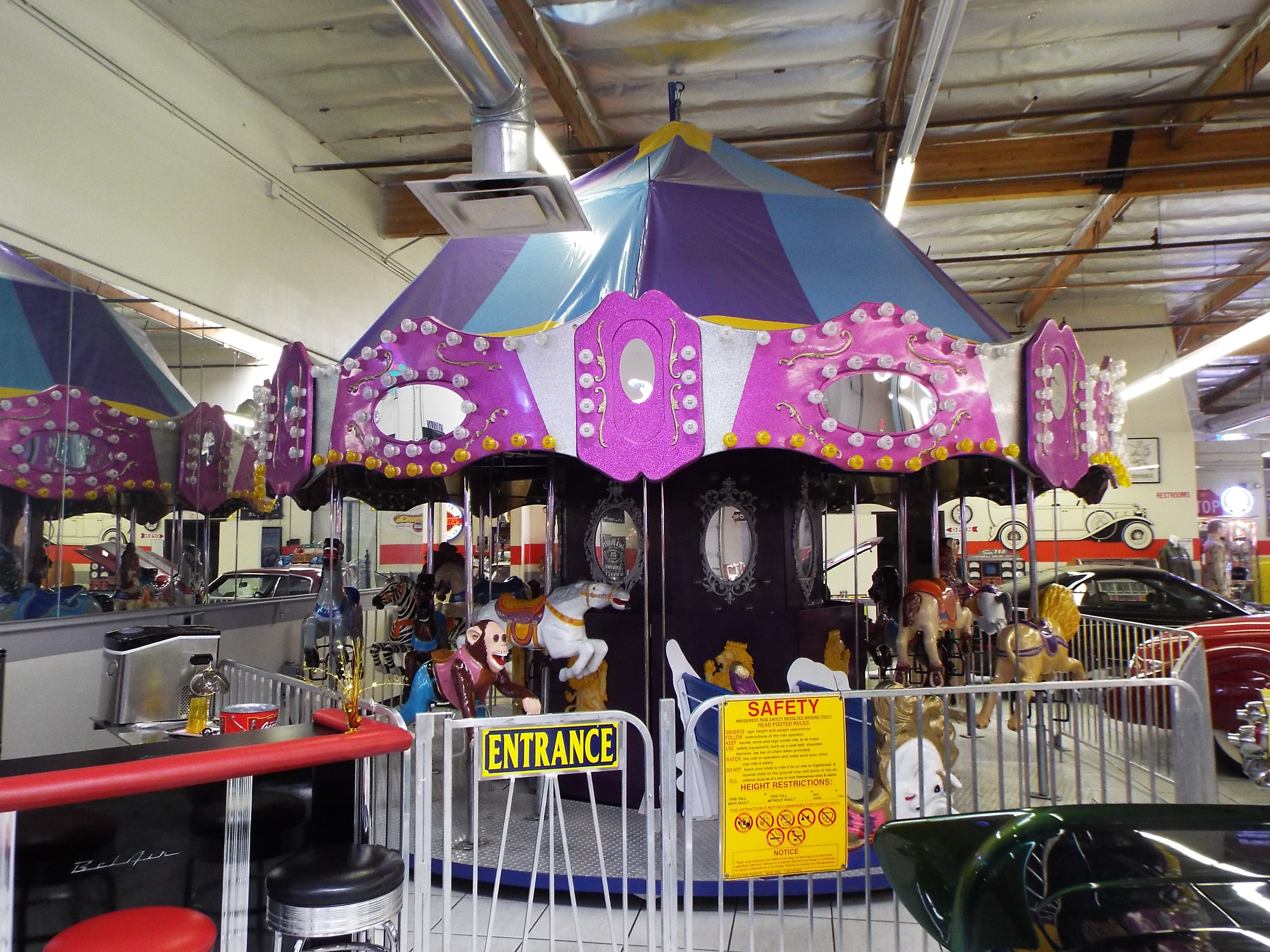
Vintage Carousel.

== See also ==
- Cave Creek Museum
- List of museums in Arizona
- List of historic properties in Phoenix, Arizona
- Children's Museum in Phoenix
- Pioneer and Military Memorial Park
- Pioneer Living History Museum
- Phoenix Police Museum
- Wells Fargo Museum
