= Cave Creek Dam (Arizona) =

Coordinates: 33°43′32.09″N 112°2′50.13″W

- Location: Maricopa County, Arizona, USA
- Opening date: 1923

Dam and spillways
- Impounds: Cave Creek Wash
- Height: 45 feet (14 m)
- Length: 1,665 feet (507 m)

The Cave Creek Dam is a multiple-arch concrete dam located near Cave Creek, Arizona that was built in 1923 by John Samuel Eastwood and was the primary dam preventing flooding in North Phoenix from 1923 to 1979, when it was replaced by the earthen Cave Buttes Dam further down the Cave Creek Wash.
