= Cave Buttes Dam =

Dam in Arizona, United States

Coordinates: 33°43′1.05″N 112°2′51.87″W

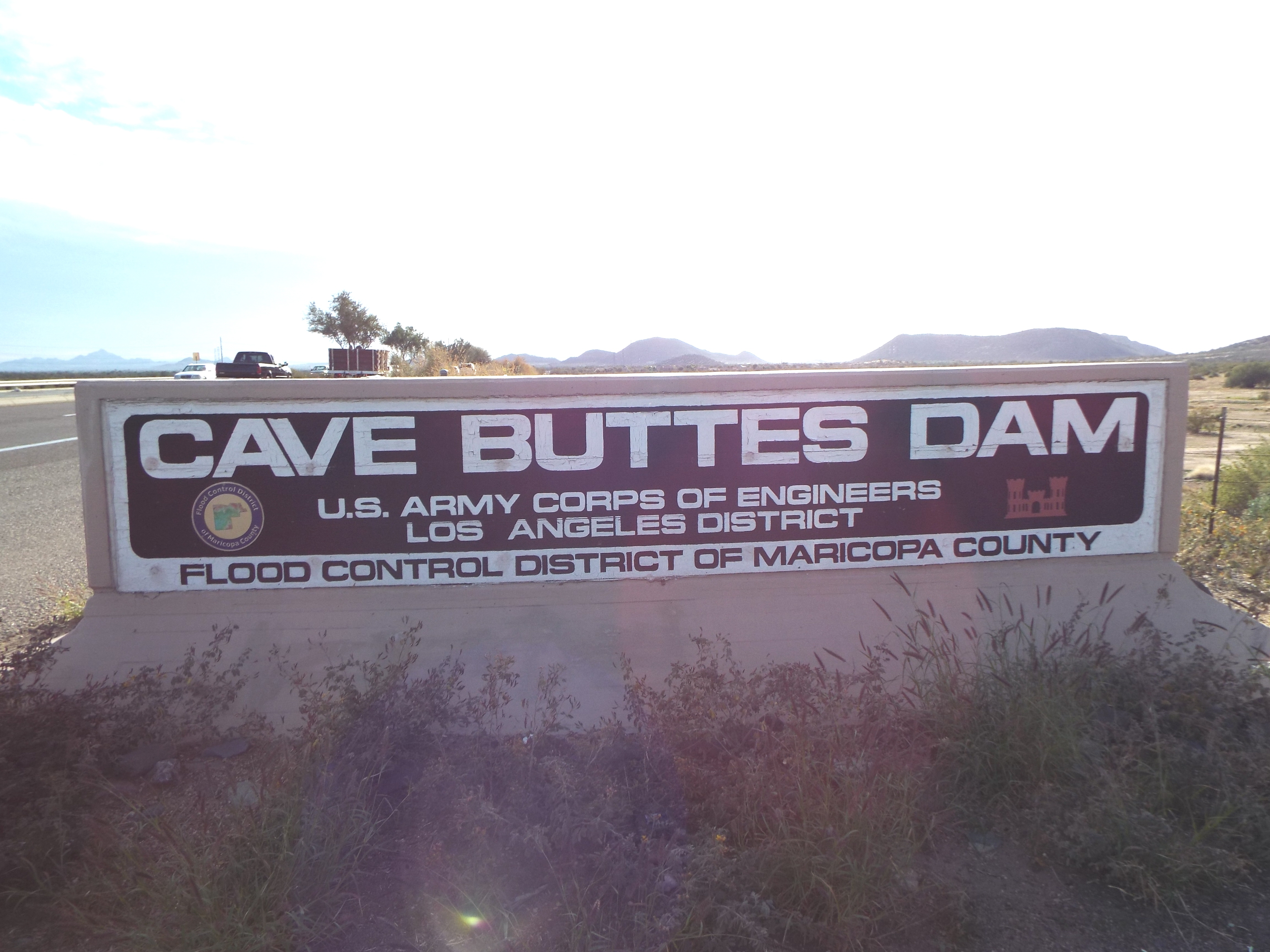
- Cave Buttes Dam marker
- Interactive map of Cave Buttes Dam
- Location: Maricopa County, Arizona, USA
- Opening date: 1979

Dam and spillways
- Impounds: Cave Creek Wash
- Height: 85 feet (26 m)
- Length: 2,000 feet (610 m)

The Cave Buttes Dam is an earthen dam located near Cave Creek, Arizona. As a dry dam, it is the primary dam to prevent flooding in North Phoenix. Built in 1979 to replace the nearby Cave Creek Dam, it is designed to prevent flooding in the city from the Cave Creek Wash.

== Gallery ==
Cave Buttes Dam in Cave Creek, Arizona.
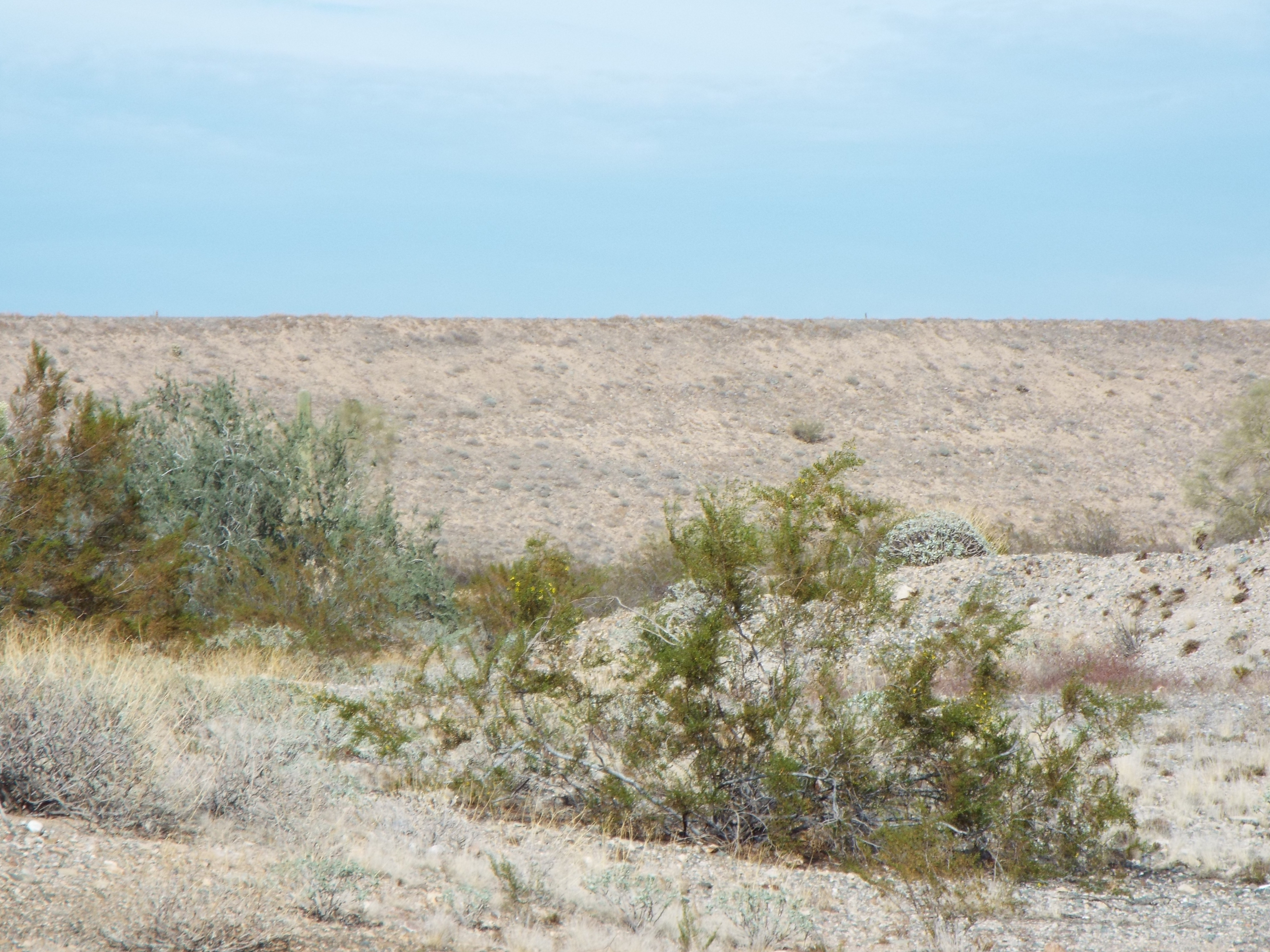
The Cave Buttes Dam, an earthen dam located near Cave Creek, Arizona.

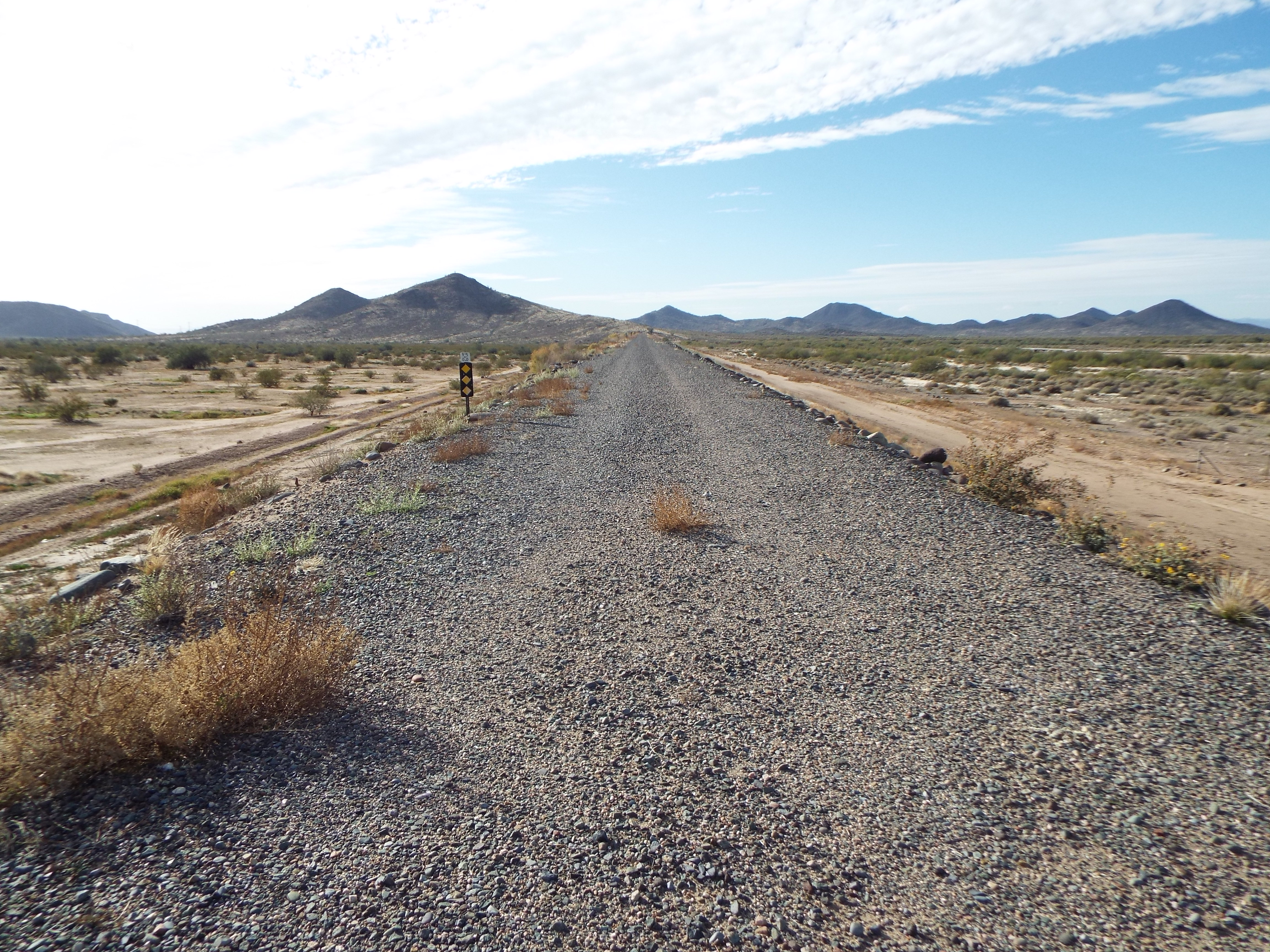
Road leading to the Cave Buttes Dam
