= List of historic properties in Jerome, Arizona =

- town
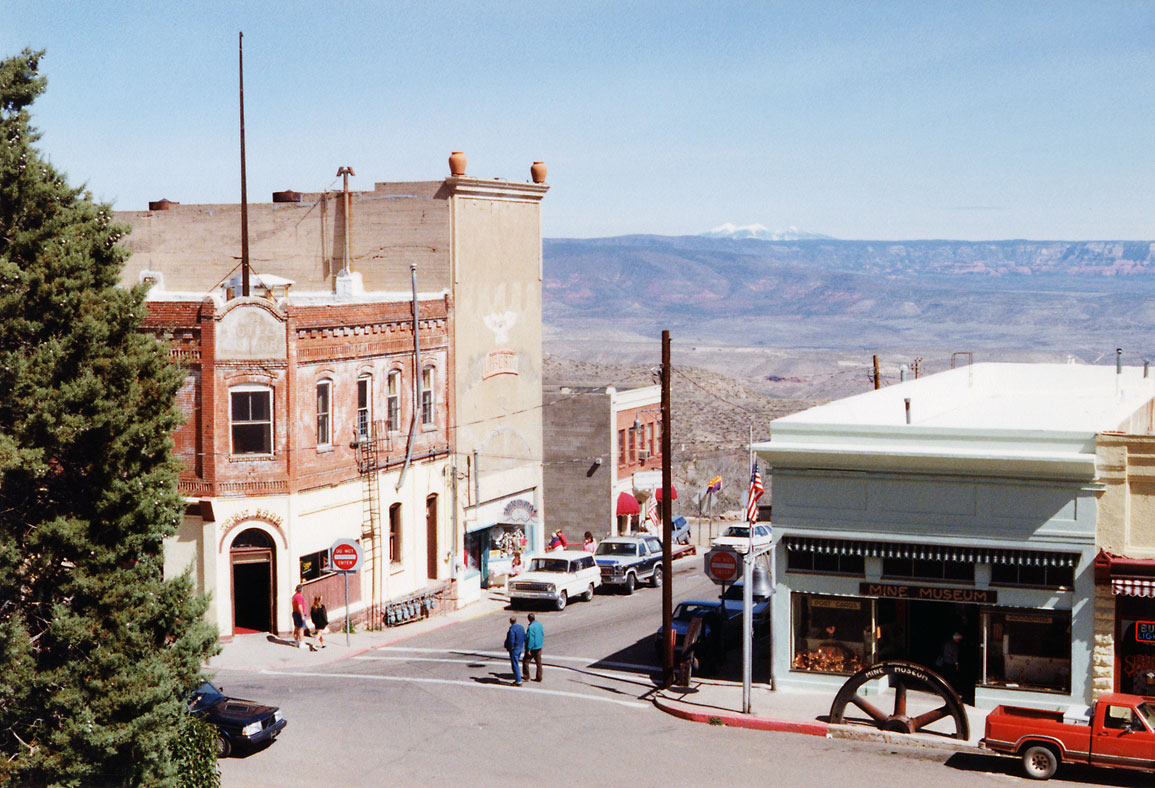
- Main Street and Jerome Avenue. The Connor Hotel is on the left side corner and the Liberty Theater is next to it.

These historic structures are identified by the Jerome Historical Society Plaque Project. Jerome is a town in the Black Hills of Yavapai County, Arizona, founded in the late 19th century on Cleopatra Hill overlooking the Verde Valley. Jerome is located between the cities of Phoenix and Sedona. The town became a National Historic Landmark in 1967.

Not all structures within the district qualify as historic. This is because most are owned by private owners who retain the right to demolish or change the façade of the structure for commercial reasons. According to the National Historic Landmarks Program, listing a private property as a National Historic Landmark or in the National Register does not prohibit any lawful actions which may otherwise be taken by the property owner with respect to the property.

The Jerome Historical Society maintains the structures identified with a plaque, along with museums and special projects. Miscellaneous items related to Jerome's history are also listed.

== Brief history ==
=== Early settlers ===
The Hohokam were the first people known to have lived and farmed near Jerome from 700 to 1125 BCE. They were also the first miners in the area, seeking the colorful copper-bearing minerals malachite and azurite, stones which they used as ornaments.

The first Europeans to arrive in the area were the Spanish conquistadores. At the time the area was part of "New Mexico", and the Spaniards often organized silver and gold prospecting expeditions in the area. In 1585, Spanish explorers made note of the ore but did not mine it because their government had sent them to find gold and silver, not copper. The area became part of Mexico when Mexico gained its independence from Spain.

The United States fought Mexico in the Mexican–American War. The war ended when the 1848 Treaty of Guadalupe Hidalgo was signed, and ceded the northern territories of Alta California and Santa Fe de Nuevo México to the United States.

=== Copper mines ===
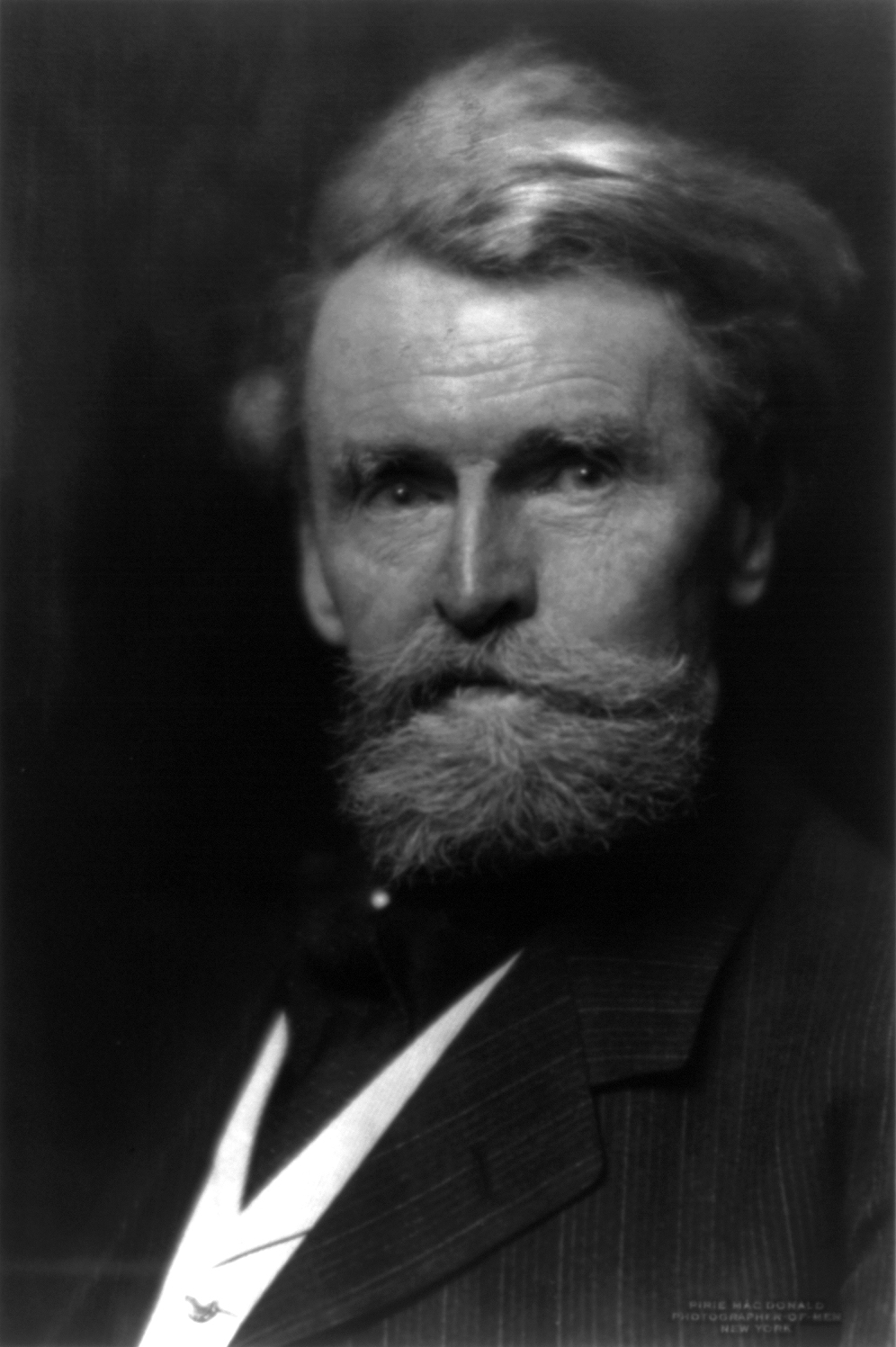
William A. Clark, c. 1899.

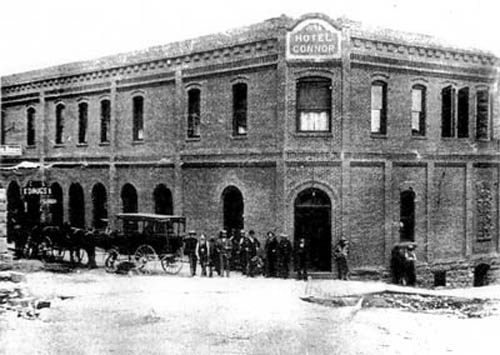
The Connor hotel in 1899

In 1880, Frederick A. Tritle, the governor of the Arizona Territory, and Frederick F. Thomas, a mining engineer, bought the mining claims from the original owners, Angus McKinnon and Morris A. Ruffner. In 1883, James A. MacDonald and Eugene Jerome joined Tritle and Thomas. They financed the mine and Jerome became the company secretary. The town was eventually named after him.

William A. Clark bought the United Verde properties. He made improvements to the mine which included an enlarged smelter. He also had a narrow gauge railway, the United Verde & Pacific built to transfer ore from Jerome Junction (a railway transfer point ) to the west. The town of Jerome was incorporated on March 8, 1898.

In 1914, a separate company, the United Verde Extension Mining Company (UVX) led by James S. Douglas, Jr. discovered a second ore body near Jerome that produced a bonanza. The UVX Mine, also known as the Little Daisy Mine, became profitable.

=== Decline of Jerome ===
In 1930, during and after the Great Depression, the price of copper fell to 14 cents a pound. In 1935, the Clark family sold United Verde to Phelps Dodge, and in 1938 UVX went out of business. As the ore deposits ran out, the mines closed. Phelps Dodge wanted to raze the town.

Dozens of buildings, including the post office and jail, were lost as the earth beneath them sank away in the 1930s. Such was the case of the Jerome Jail. Jerome's housing stock and other buildings met a wide variety of fates over the years. Some burned or collapsed, such as the former Cuban Queen Bordello building which collapsed in 2017, and some were demolished by the Phelps Dodge Co. Among the buildings which were demolished was the Main Street Primary School in 1945 and the T.F. Miller building in 1953. By the mid-1950s Jerome, which once was Arizona's 4th largest city, was destined to become a ghost town. This however, did not happen due to the efforts of the few remaining residents who were determined to save the town. They succeeded when they turned to tourism and retail sales as a source of revenue. Jerome became a National Historic Landmark on November 13, 1966.

== Jerome Historical Society ==
The Jerome Historical Society was founded in 1953 and is located at 407 Clark Street. In 1956 the society completed negotiations with Phelps Dodge assuring that no more buildings would be torn down in the main part of Jerome. The aim of the society is to "protect, preserve and present the unique physical and natural history of Jerome ... for the benefit of residents and current and future generations."

The members Jerome Historical Society do not have the ability to deny a demolition permit. Therefore, the owner of a property, even if it is listed either in the National Register of Historic Places, has the ability to demolish the historical property. According to Jim McPherson, Arizona Preservation Foundation Board President:

It is crucial that residents, private interests, and government officials act now to save these elements of our cultural heritage before it is too late.

== Historic properties ==
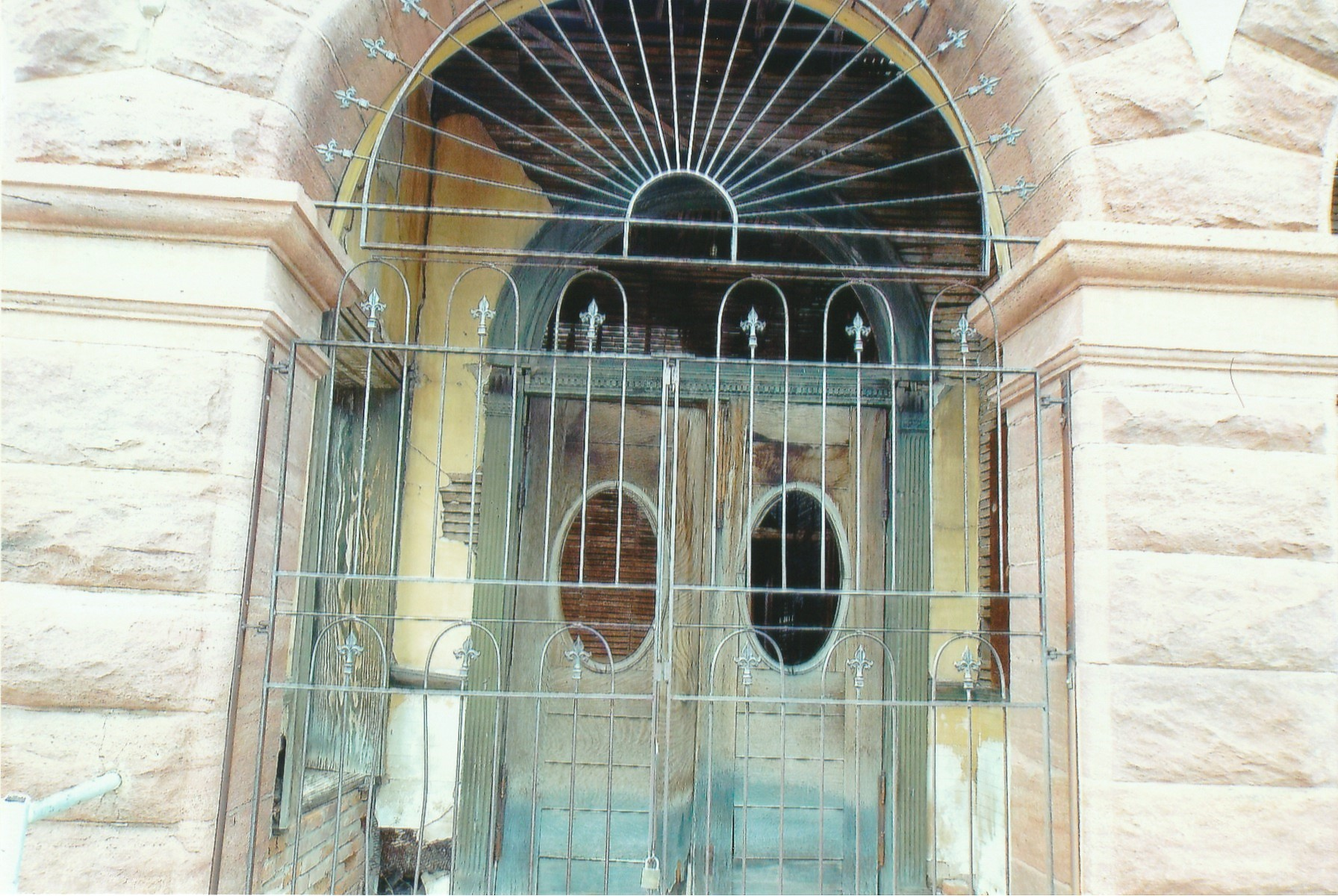
One entrance of the Barlett Hotel.

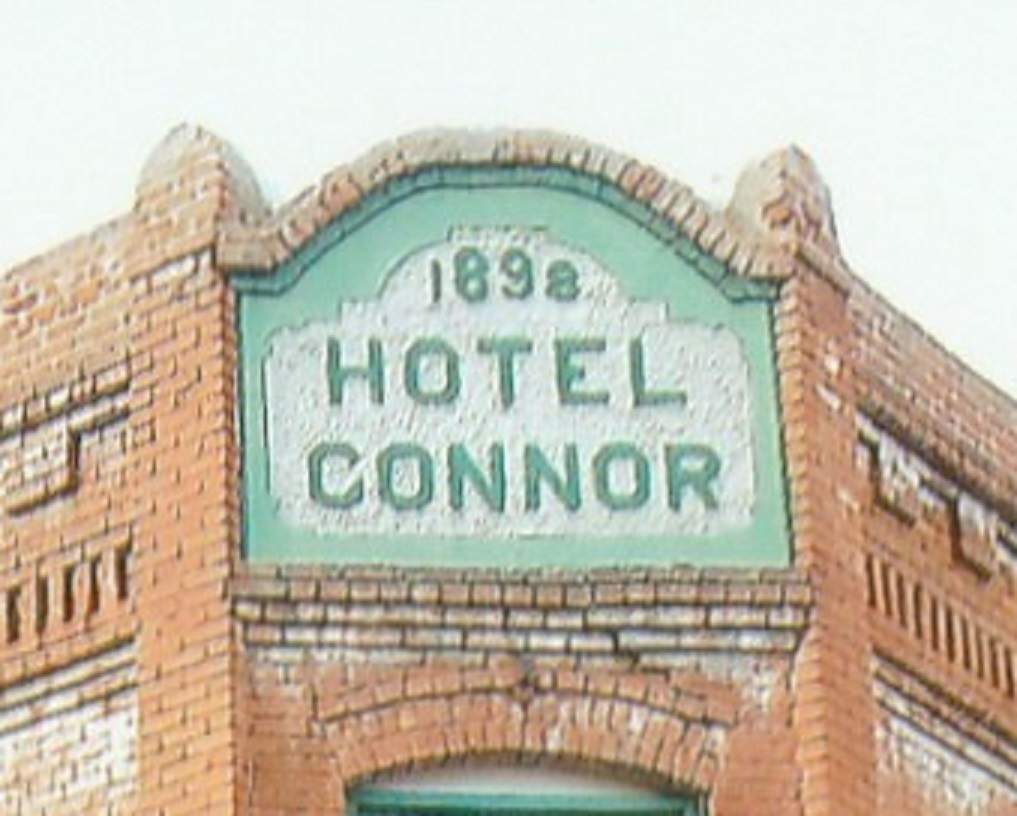
The Hotel Connor.

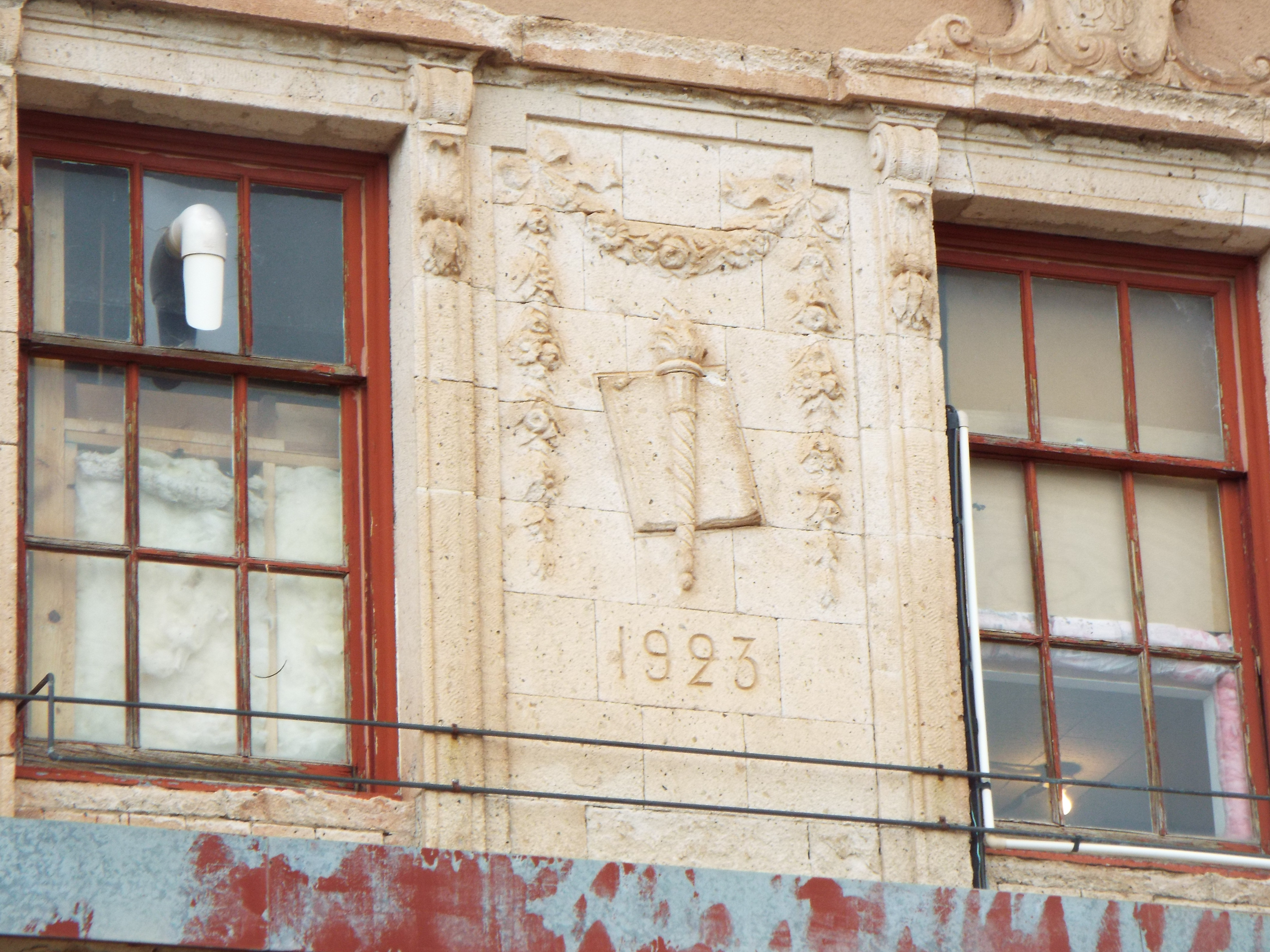
The Details of the Old High School entrance.

Not every property within the Jerome Historic District is historical. The structures which have been identified as historical by the Jerome Historical Society Plaque Project have a mounted plaque, placed by the society. The historic properties, according to the Historical Marker Database, in Jerome which are pictured are the following:

- Abandoned Little Daisy Mine headquarters c. 1890s building located at 50 Douglas Road.
- The Barlett Hotel built in 1901 located on the intersection of Main and First Street.
- The Douglas Mansion was built in 1916 and is located in Little Daisy Street.
- The Hotel Connor was built in 1898 and is located on the intersection of Main Street and Jerome Ave.
- Jennie's Place was a brothel built in 1898 and owned by Madam Belgiam Jennie.
- The Jerome City Hall built c. 1890 and located on Main Street.
- The Grand Hotel was built in 1926 as the United Verde Hospital and is located at 200 Hill Street.
- The Jerome Palace built in the 1900s and located at 410 Clark Street is now home to the "Haunted Hamburger".
- The Lawrence Memorial Hall a.k.a. Spook Hall, was built in 1917 as a garage before it became the home of JCPenney from 1937 to 1953. It is located on Hull Avenue.
- The Liberty Theatre was a silent movie theater built in 1918 in Jerome Avenue. It closed its doors as a theater in 1929.
- The Little Daisy Hotel was built in 1917 and located at 100 Douglas Road.
- The Paul & Jerry's Saloon was built in 1899 and served as the Senate Saloon downstairs and a Chinese Restaurant upstairs. It is located on 206 Main Street.
- The Reese and Amster Garage was built in 1920 and is located at 111 Main Street.
- The Surgeon's Mansion was built in 1917 and served as the residence of the chief surgeon of the United Verde Copper Company's hospital. It is located at 100 Hill Street.
- The New State Motor Building was built in 1918. It was a car dealership and show room upstairs and a garage downstairs.
- The Mine Museum/Fashion Saloon and the Whitten Printers structure was built in 1917 and is located on the intersection of Main Street and Jerome Avenue. The museum is located in the front while the Whitten Printers section of the building is located in the basement.
- The Sullivan Apartments – built in 1917 and is located at 367 Main Street.
- The Boyd Hotel built in 1890 and located at 331 Main Street.
- The Garcia House built in 1885 and located at 541 Main Street The Garcia House was originally to house mine management. Now, known as the Ghost City Inn Bed and Breakfast.
- The Haskins House/Haskins Apartments built in 1888 and located on Main Street.
- The Grocery Store Ruins – built in 1900 and located at 220 1st Street (now known as the "La Victoria Studio").
- The House of Joy - built in 1892 and George Hulls home from 1893 to 1898
- The ruins of the mine Guard House.
- The Old Jerome High School – built in 1923 and located at 885 Hampshire Ave.

== Historic properties and structures pictured ==
Historic Buildings

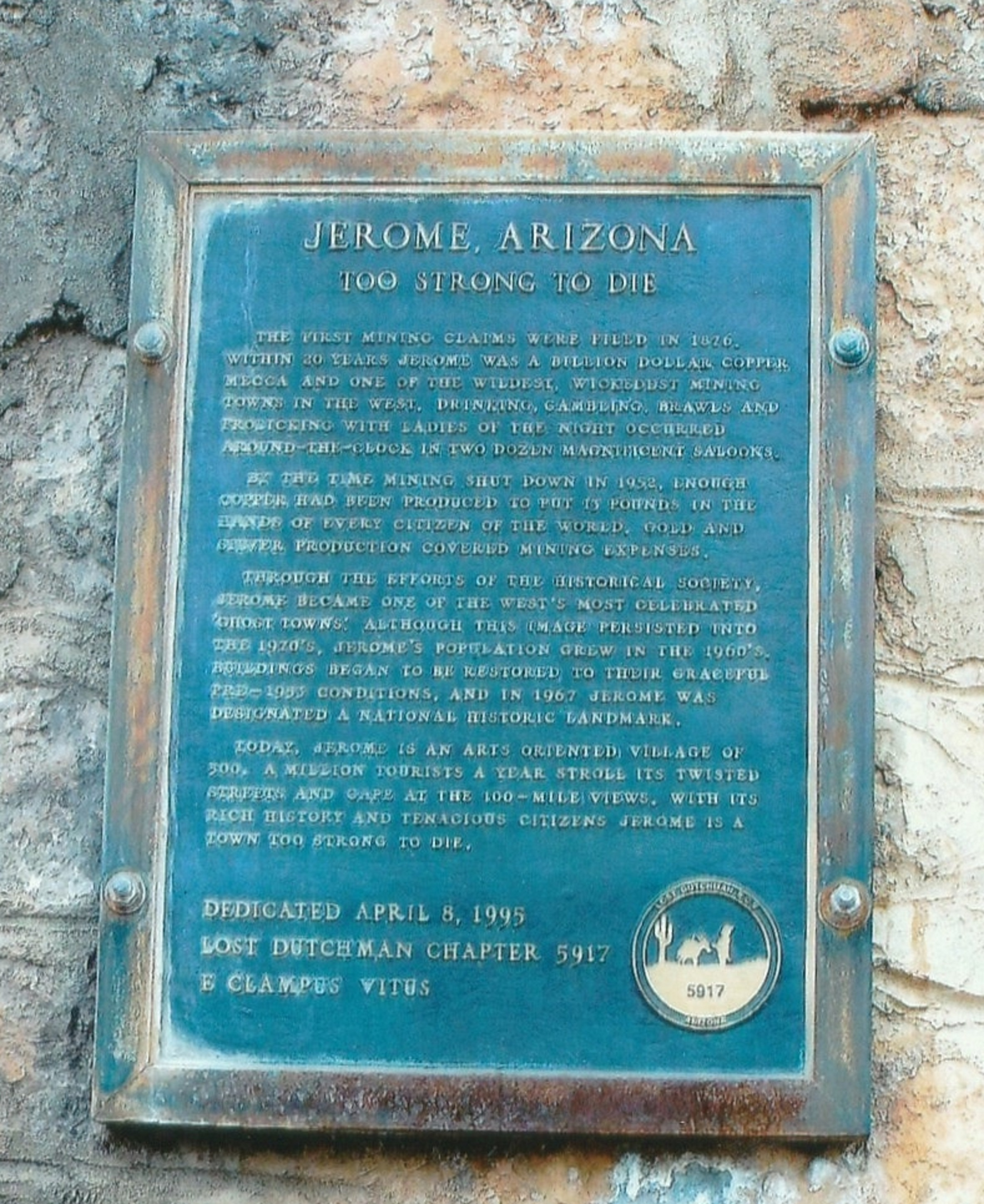
Jerome marker

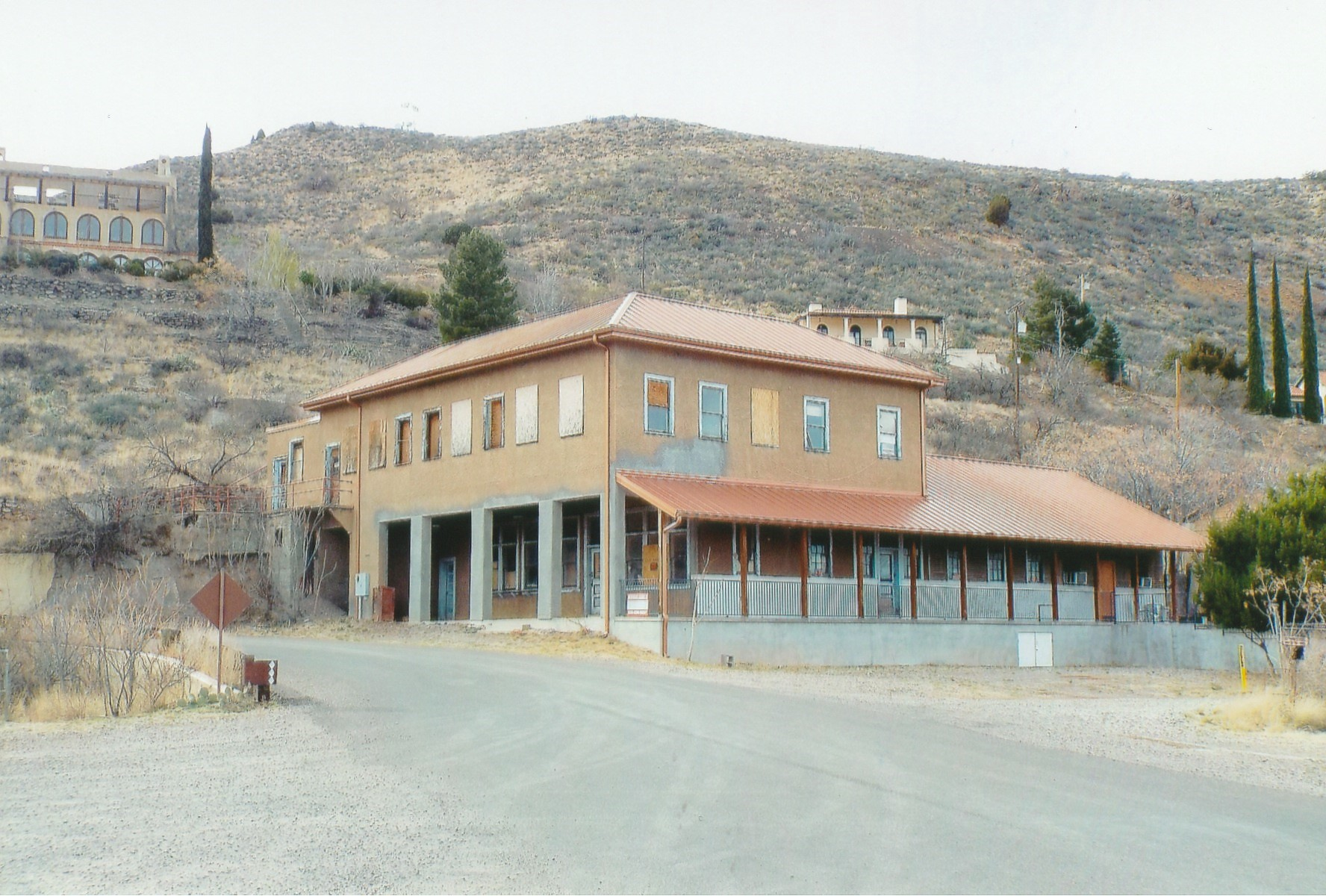
UVX mine building.

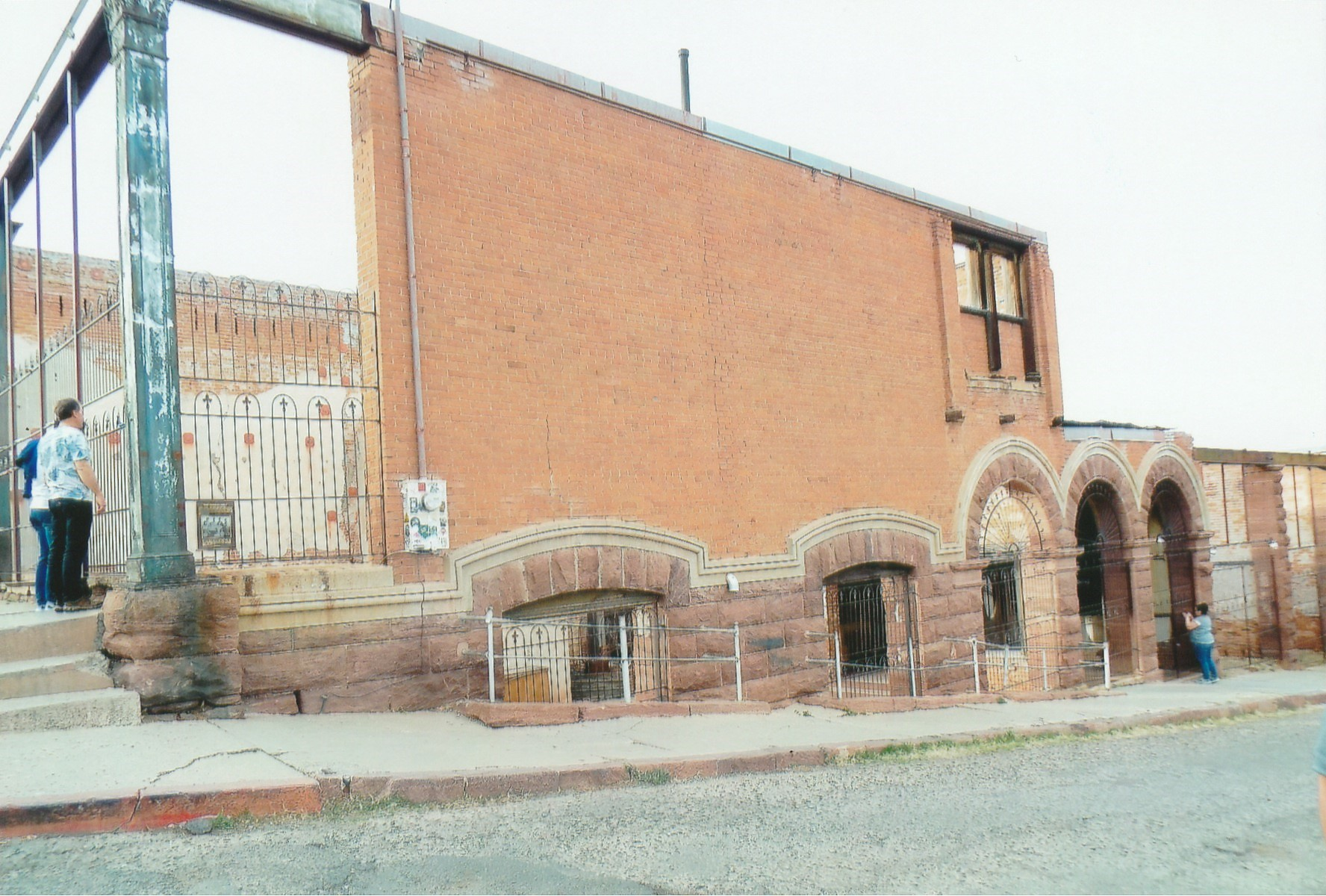
Ruins of the Barlett Hotel.

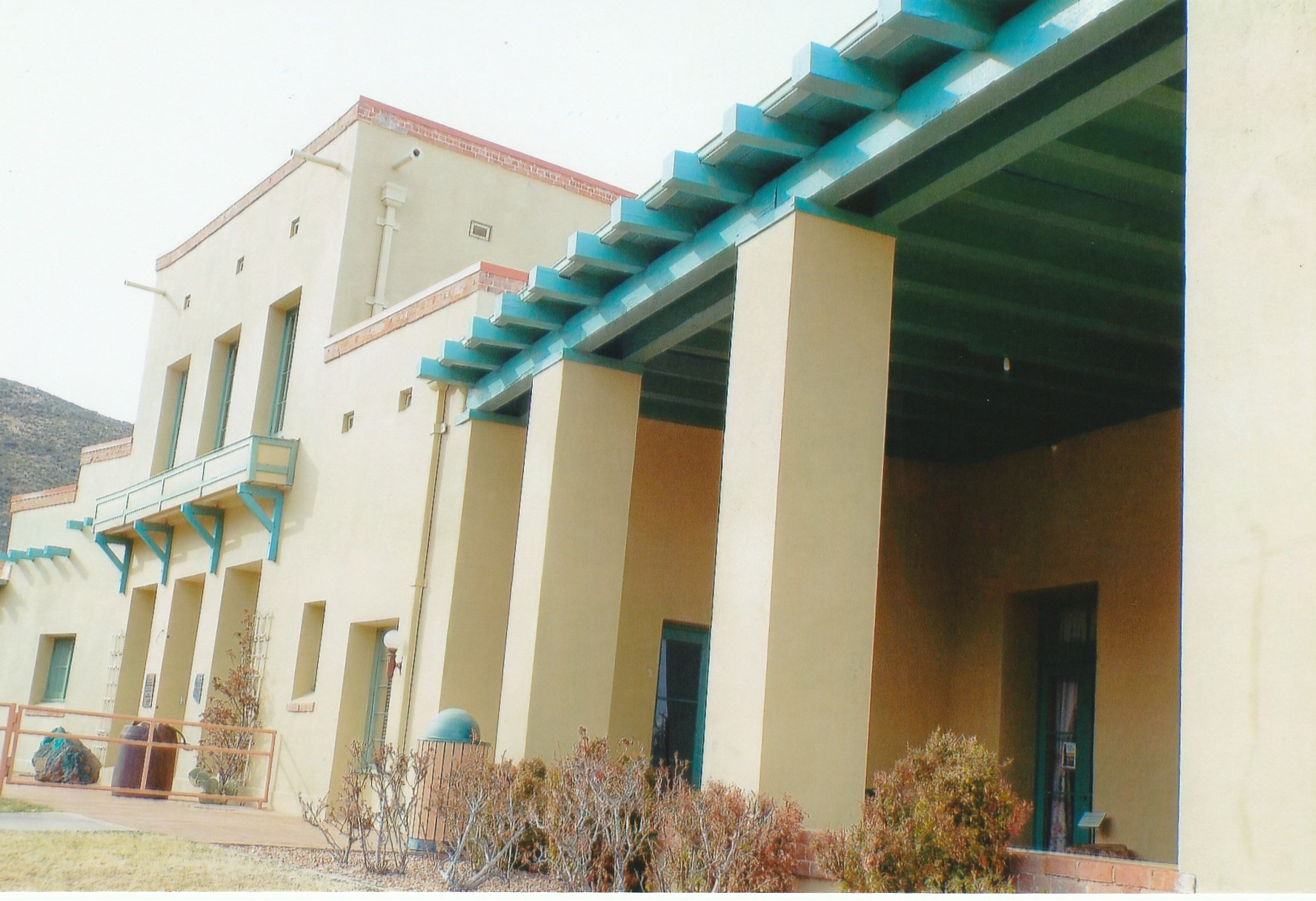
The Douglas Mansion.

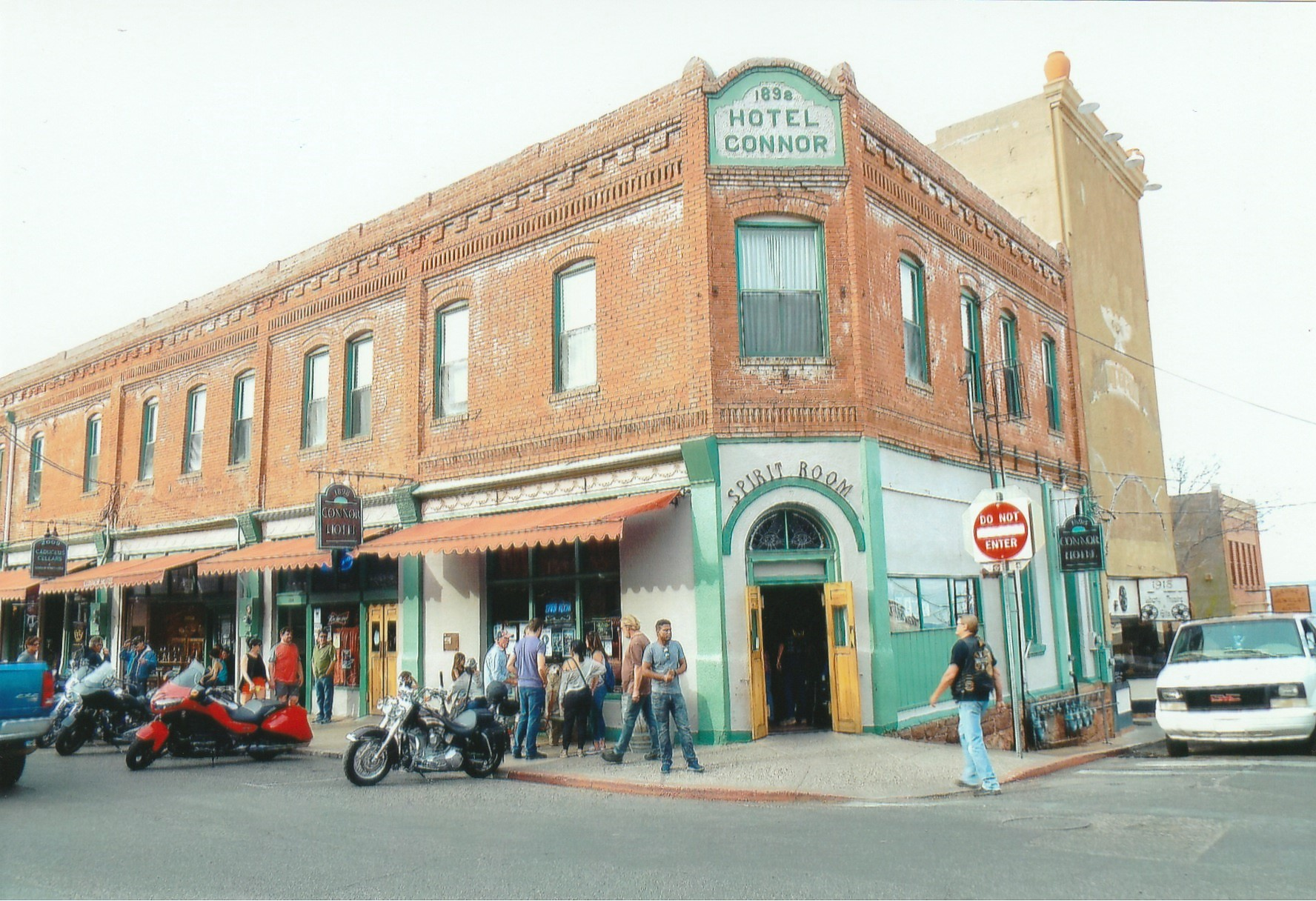
The Hotel Connor.

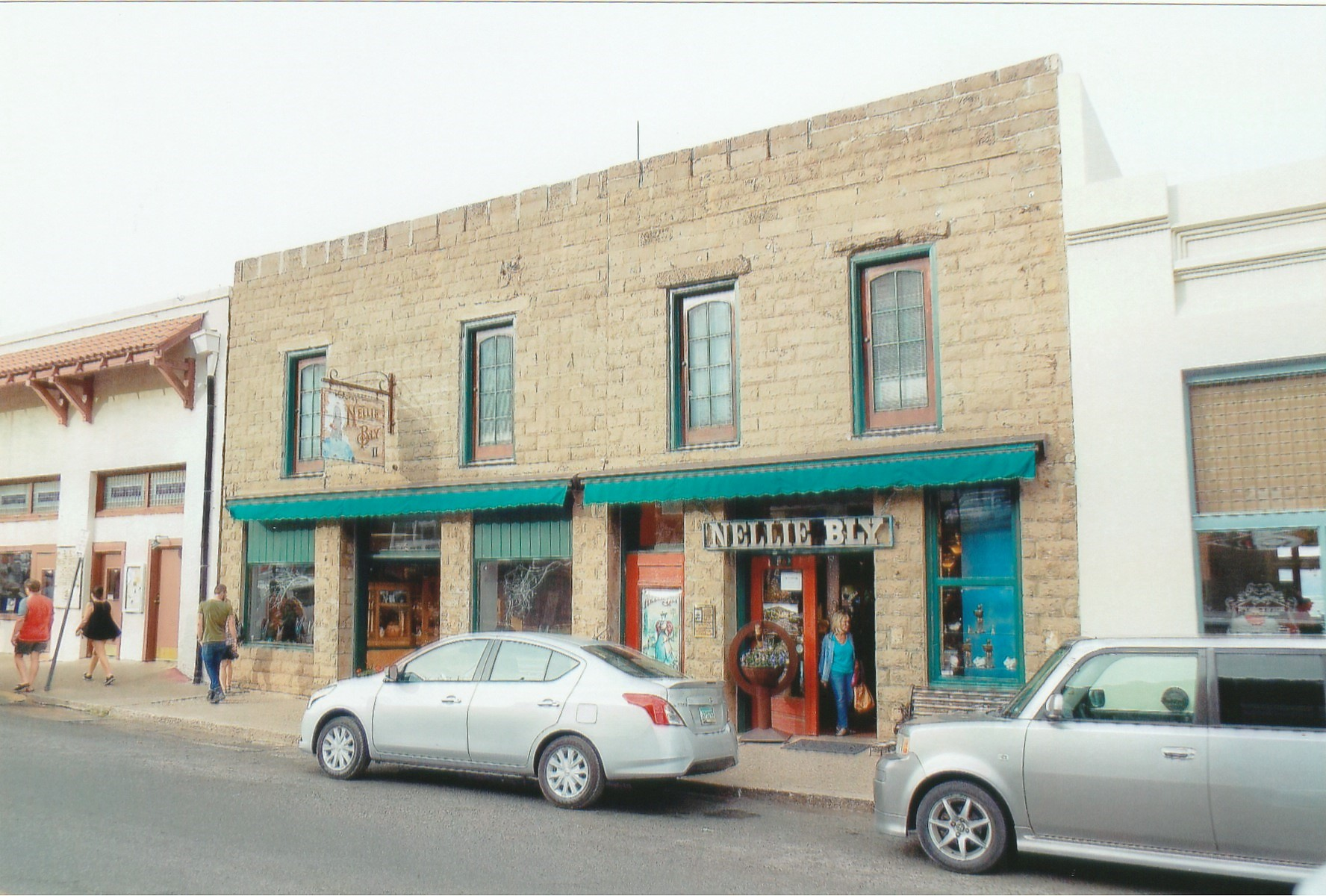
Jennie's Place.

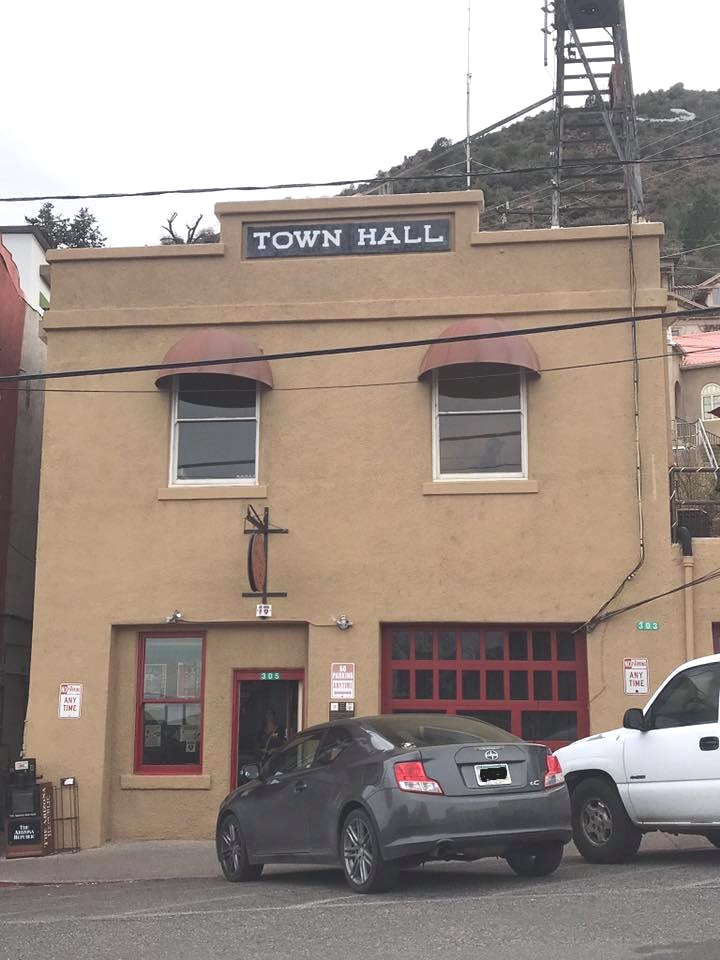
Jerome City Hall.

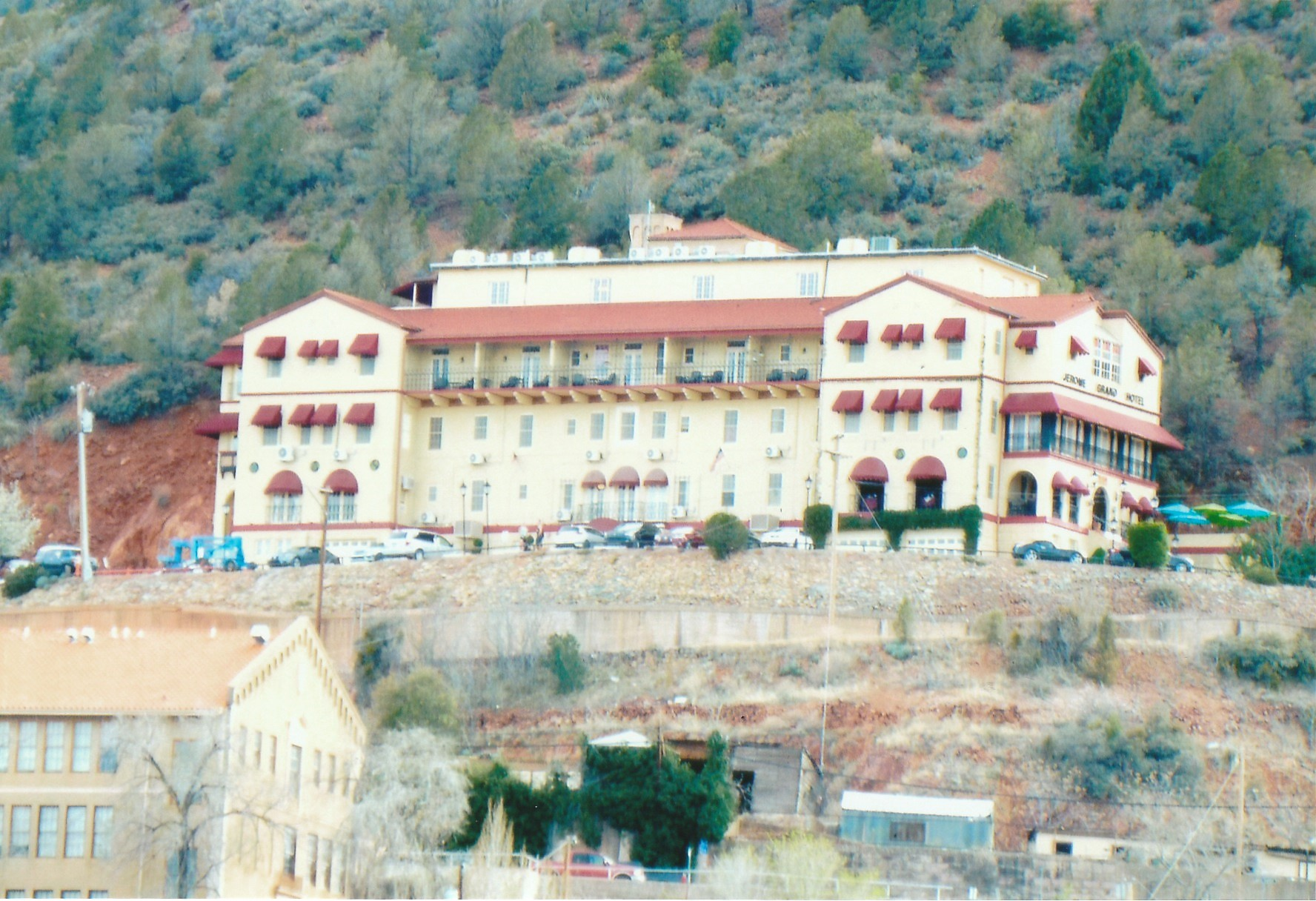
Jerome Grand Hotel.

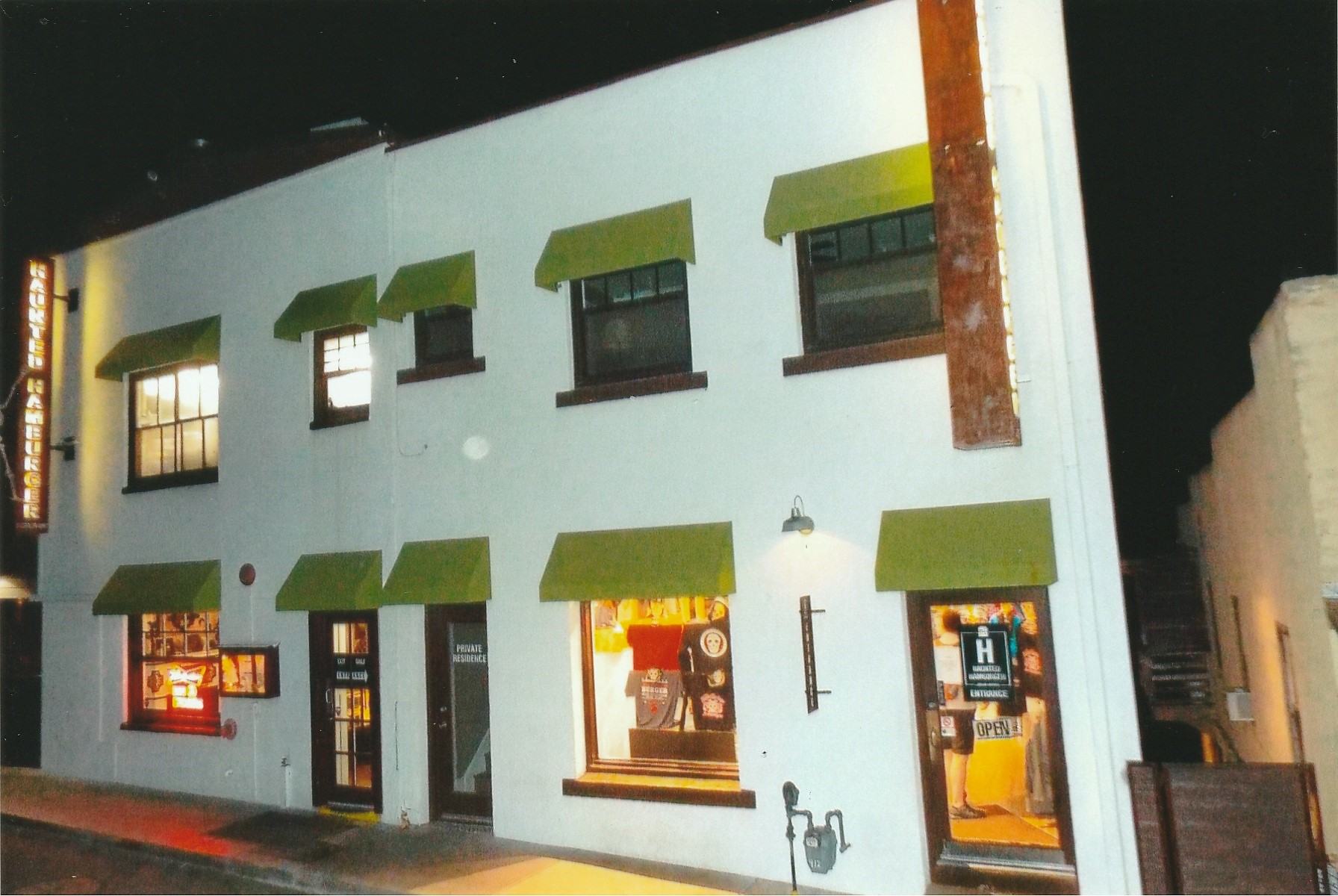
Jerome Palace.

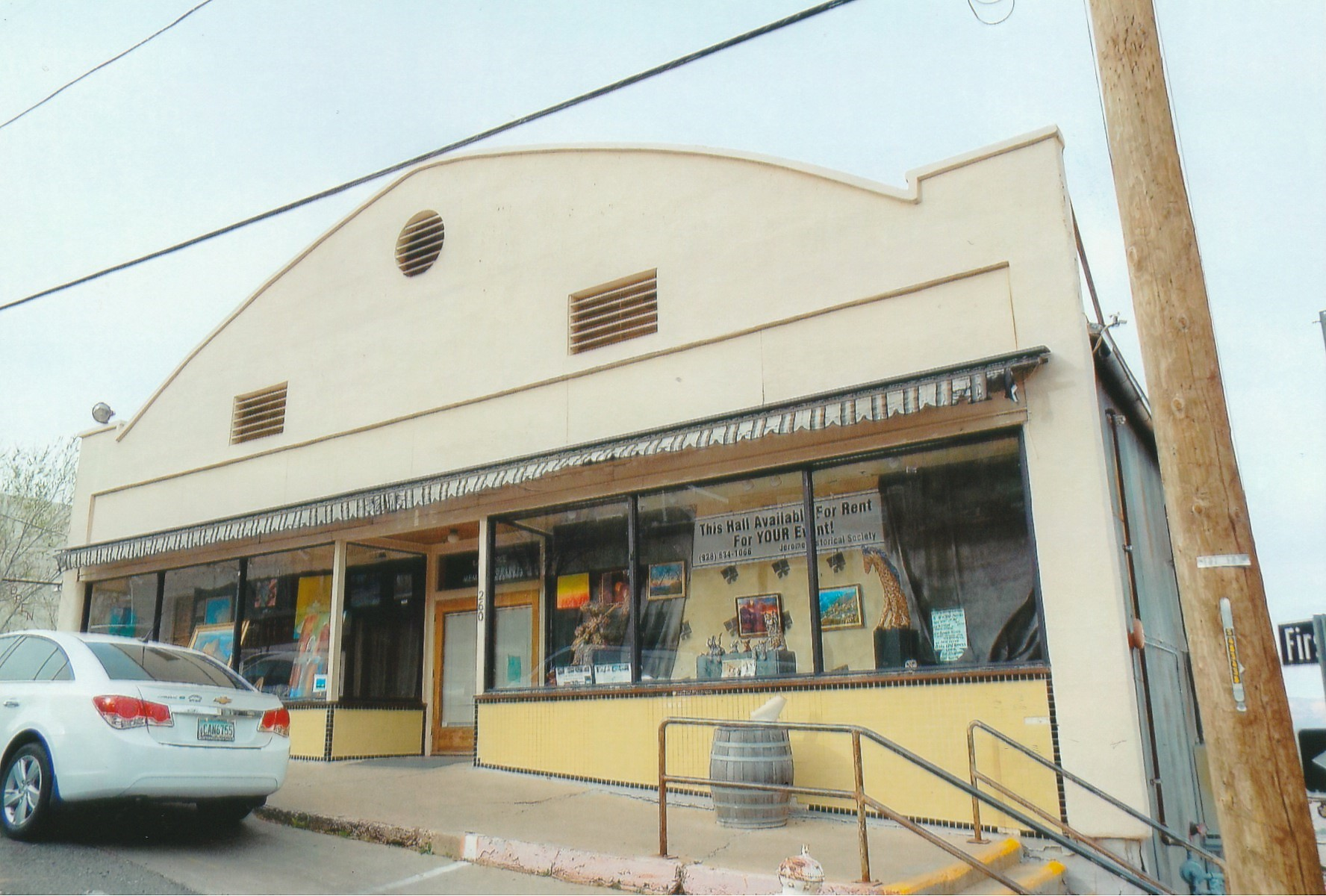
J.C. Penney building.

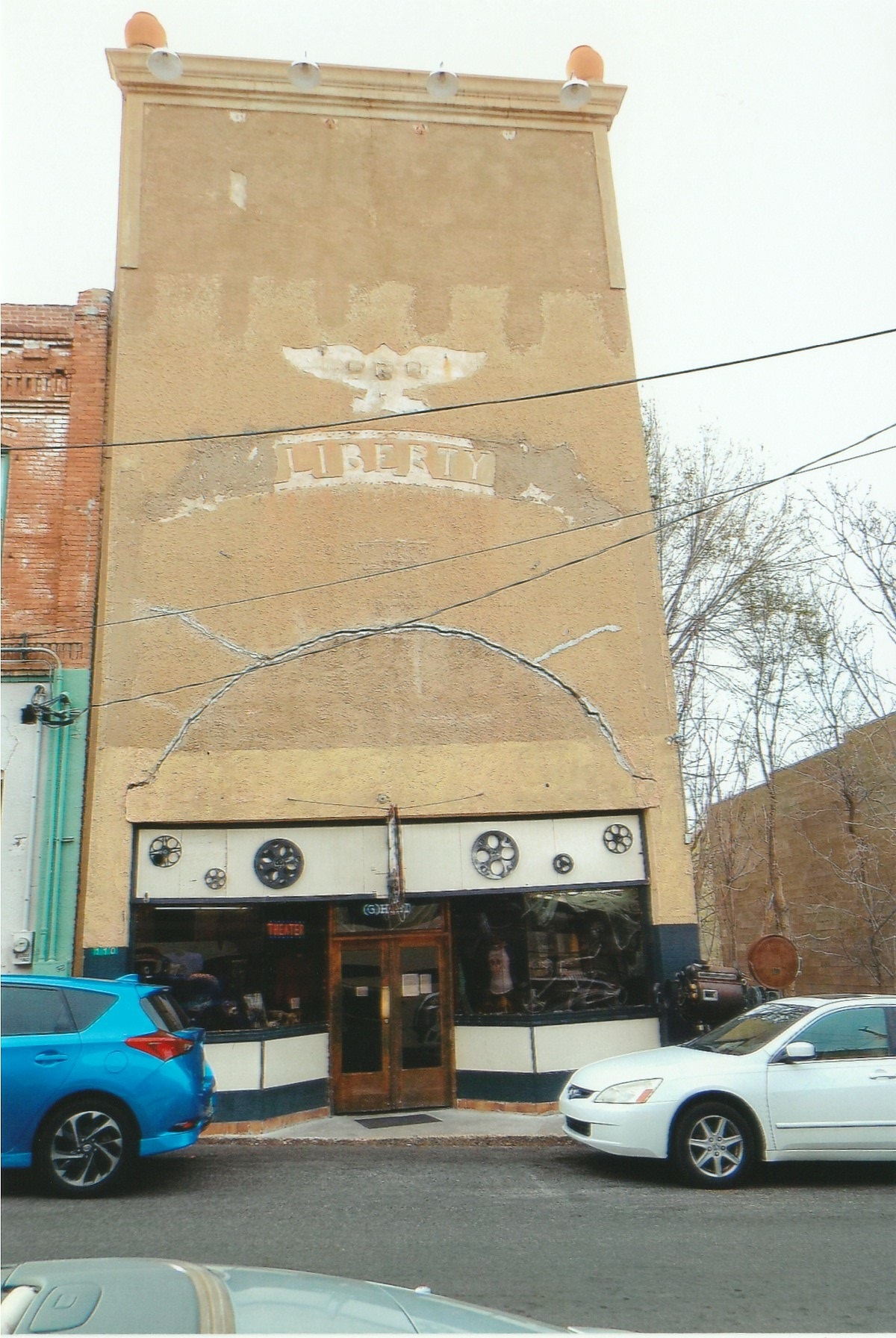
Liberty Theater.

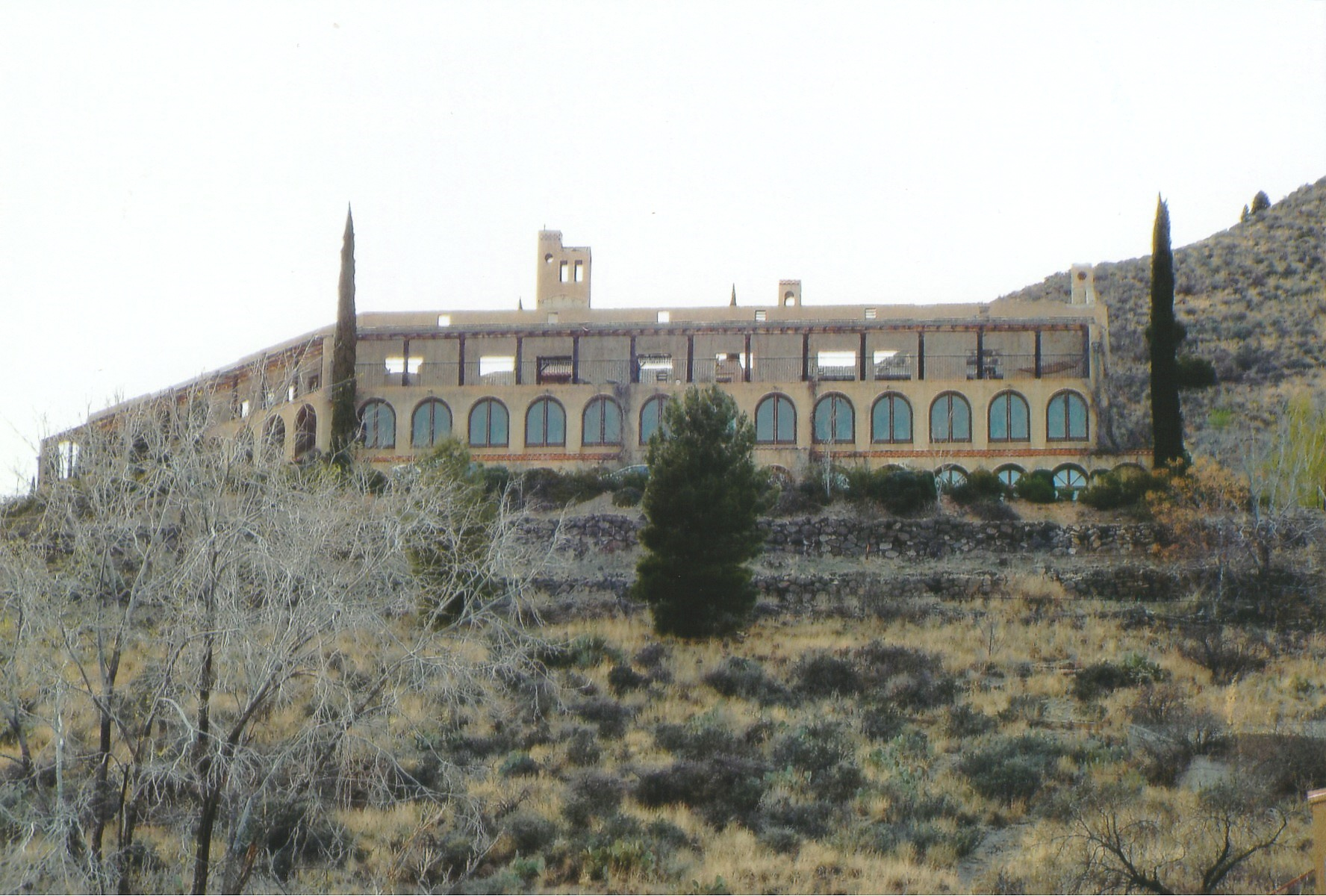
The Little Daisy Hotel.

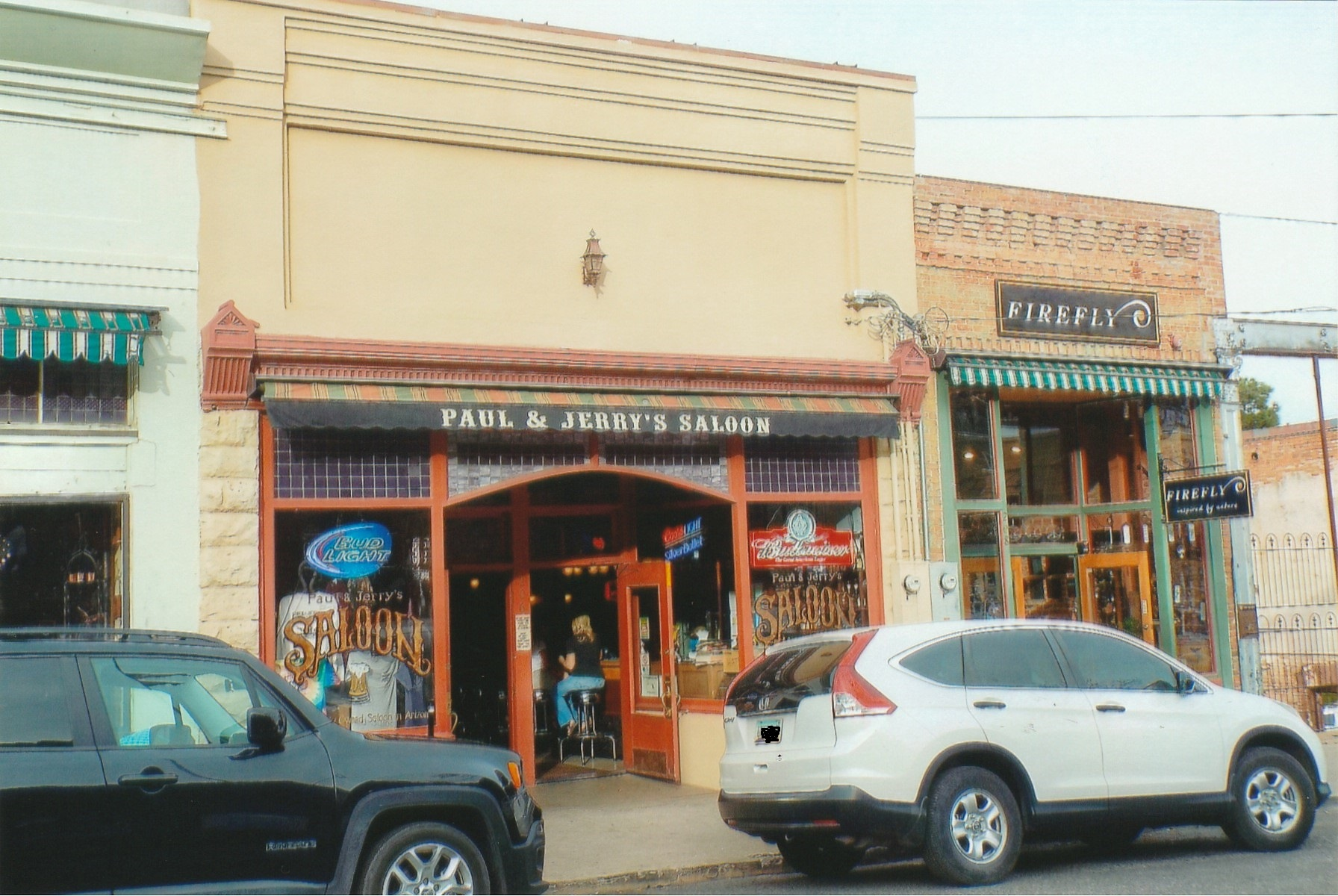
Paul & Jerry's Saloon.

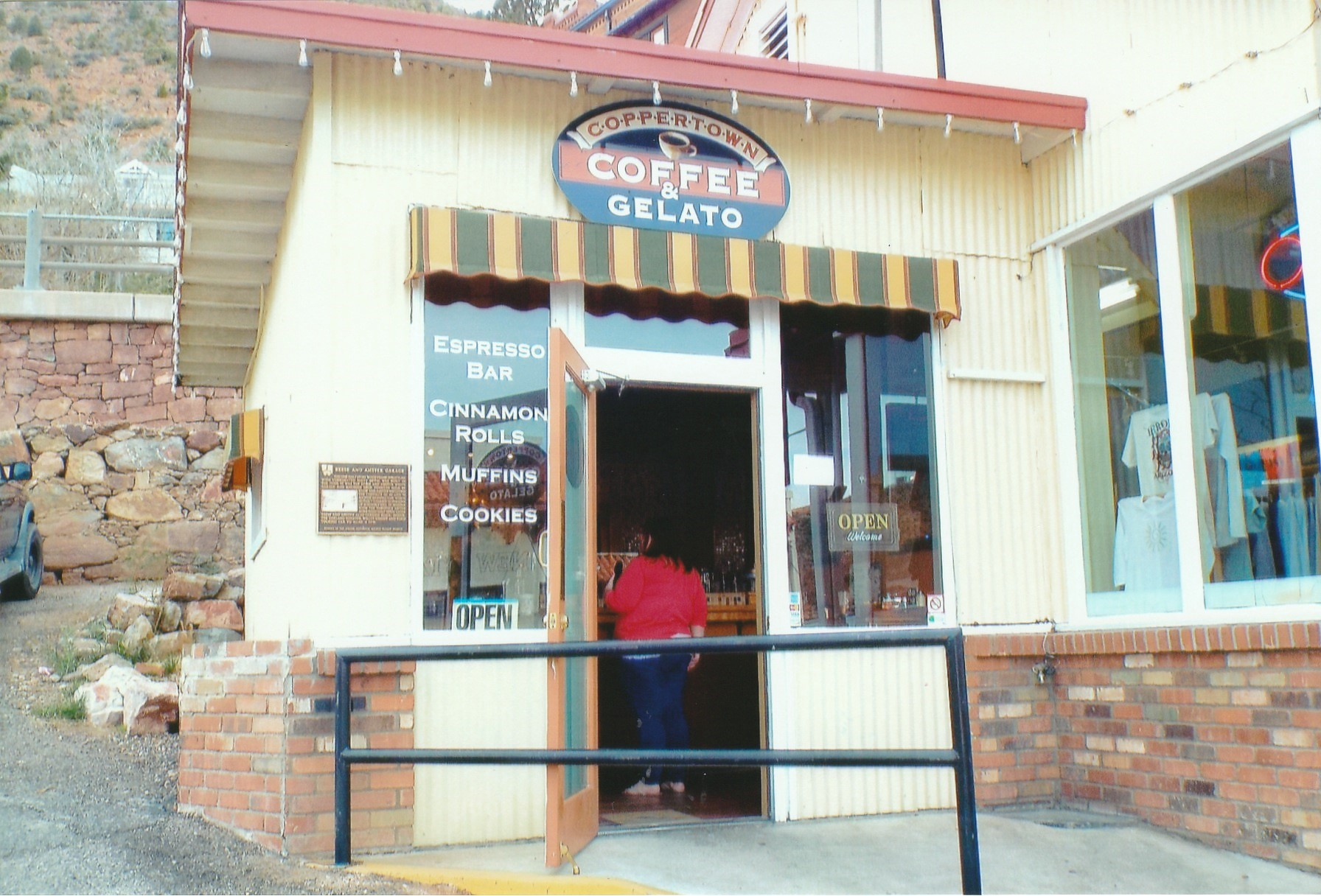
Reese and Amster Garage.

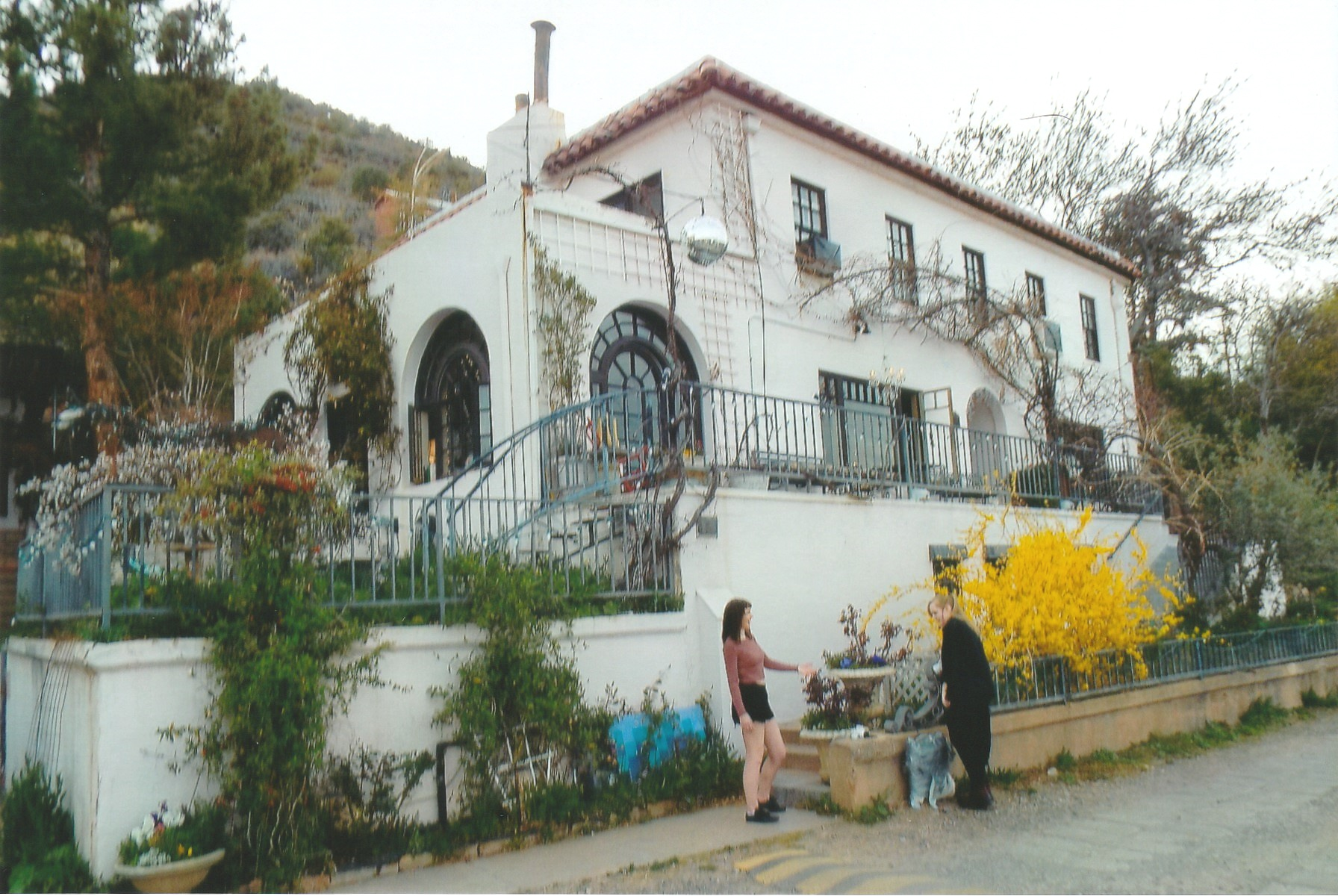
The Surgeon’s Mansion.

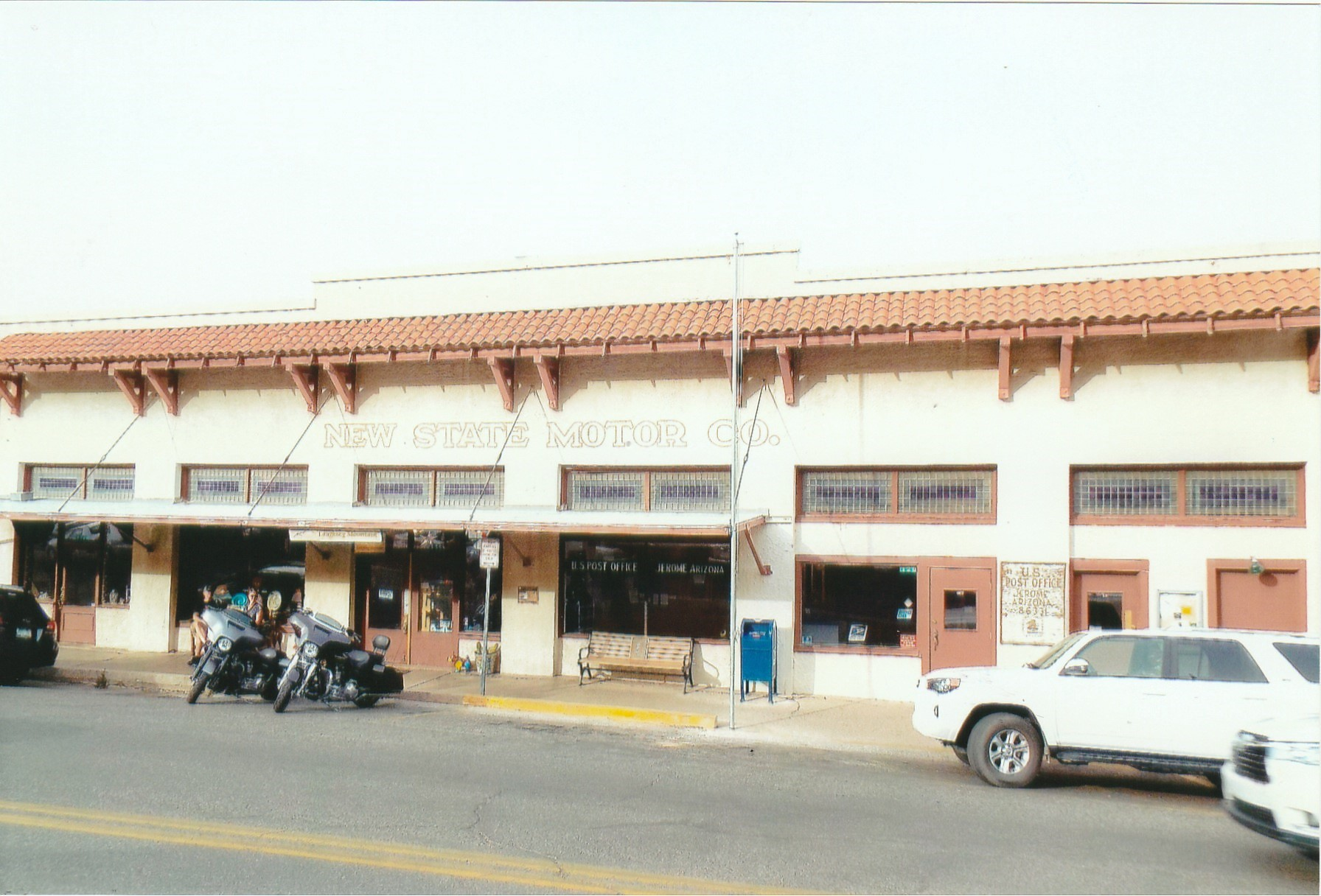
The New State Motor Building.

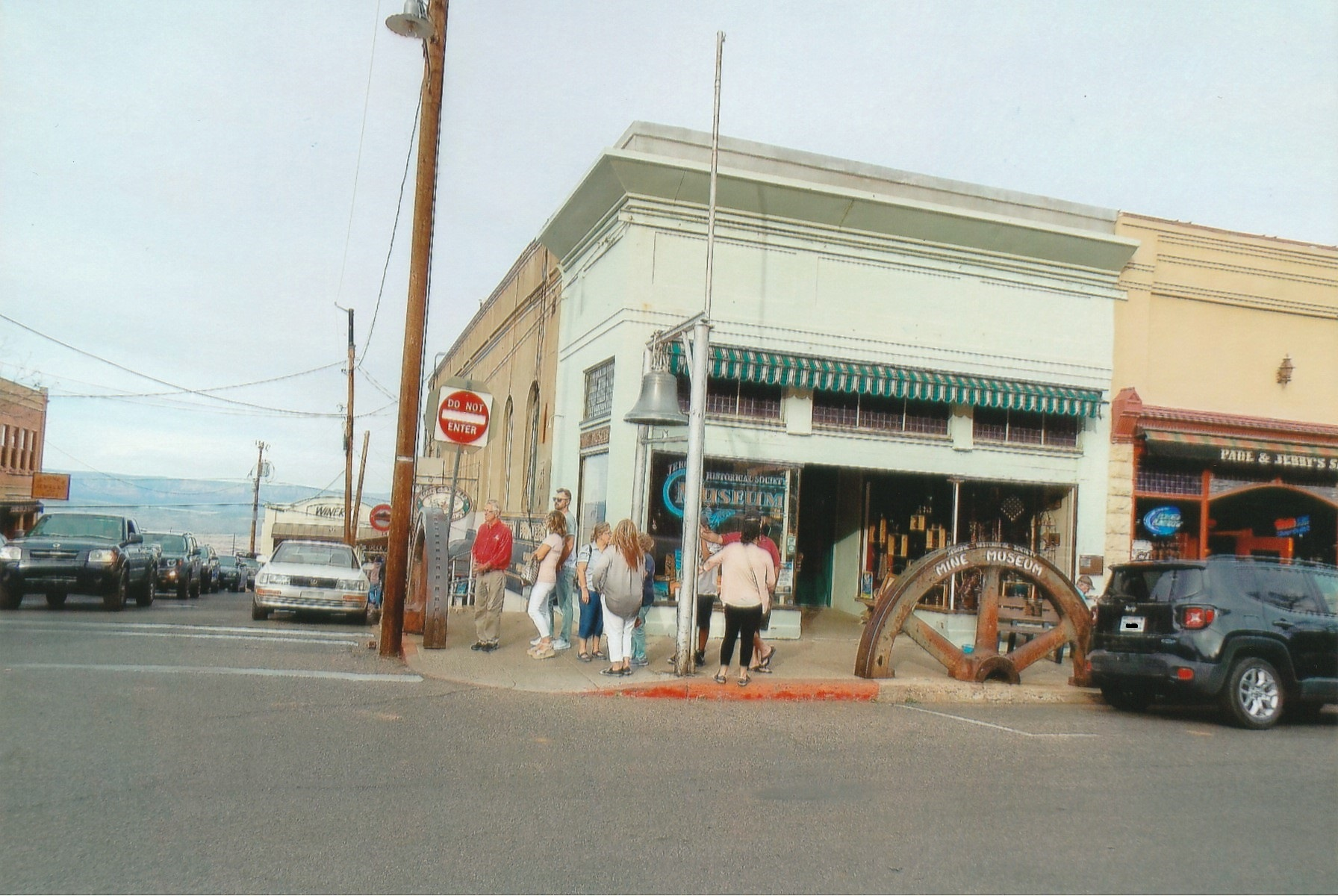
Mine Museum/Fashion Saloon and the Whitten Printers building.

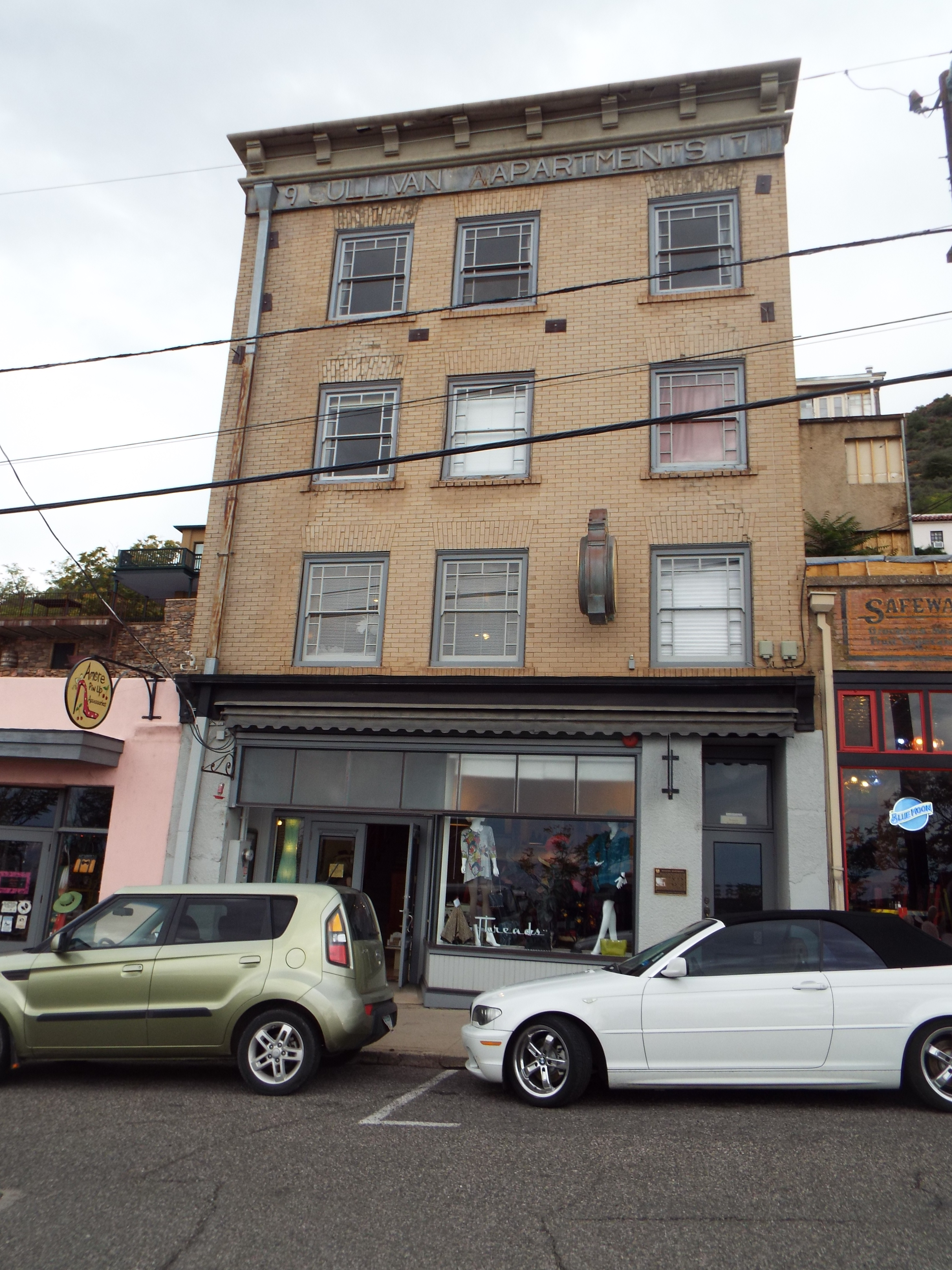
Sullivan Apartments

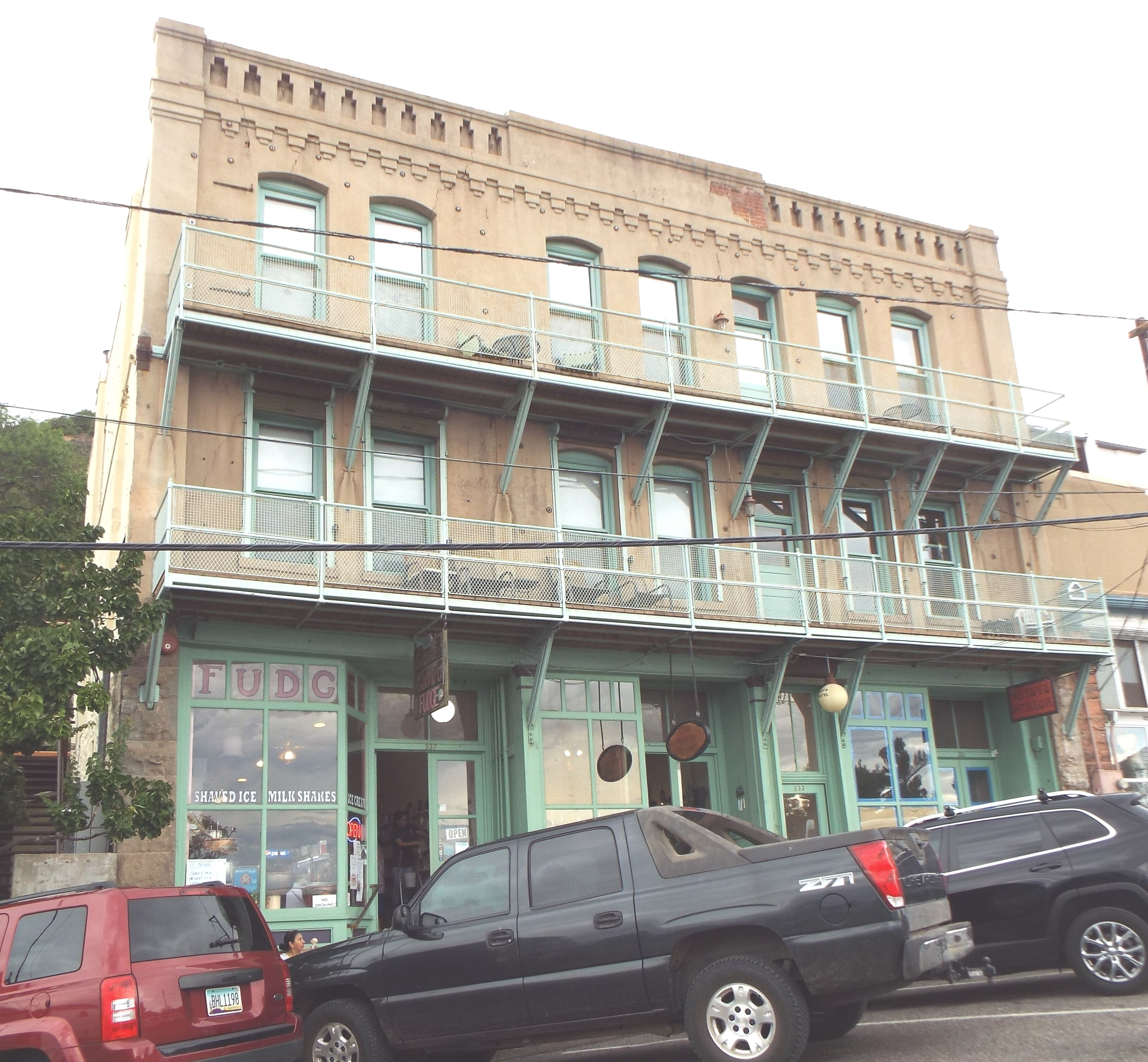
Boyd Hotel

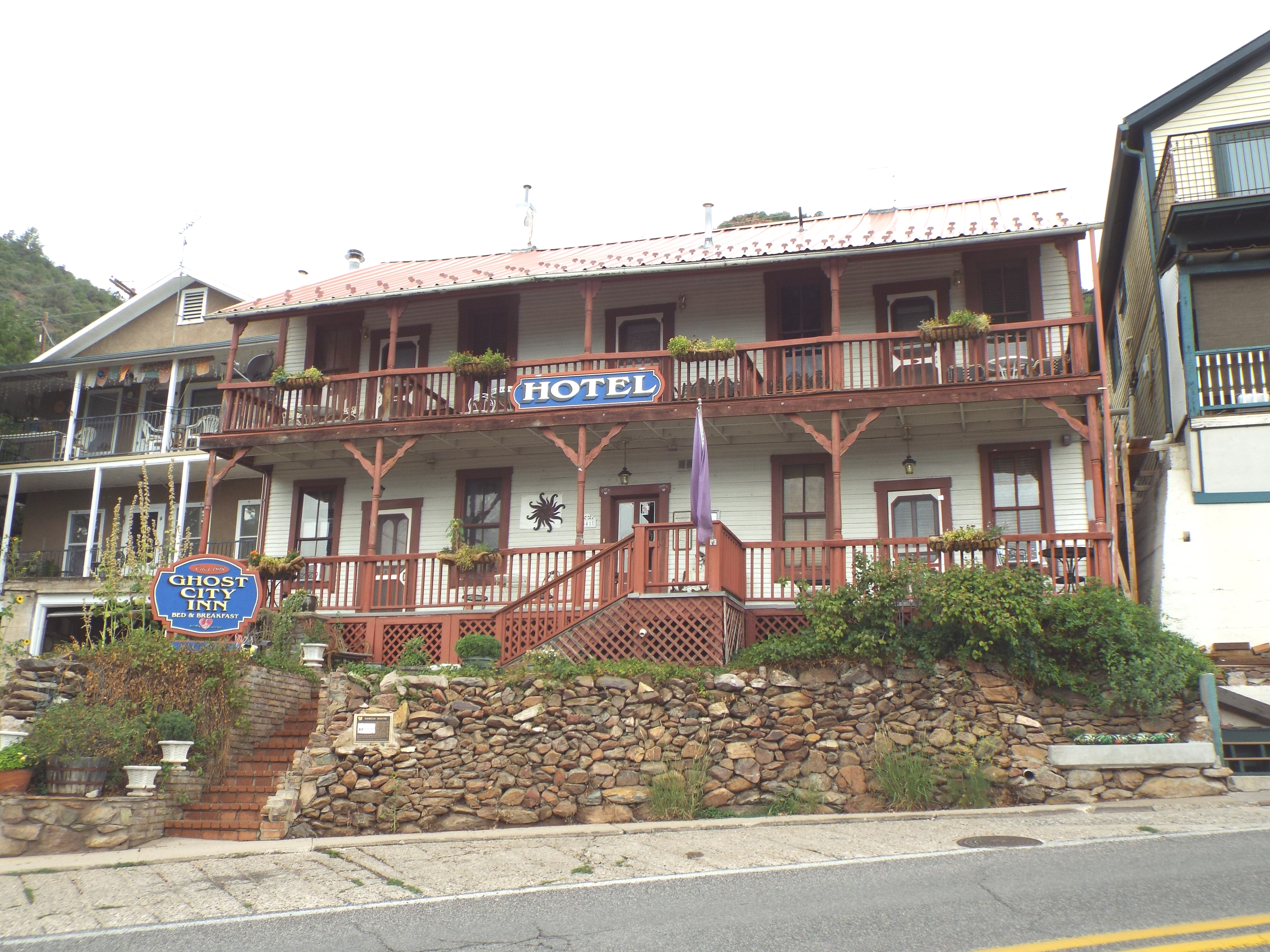
Garcia House

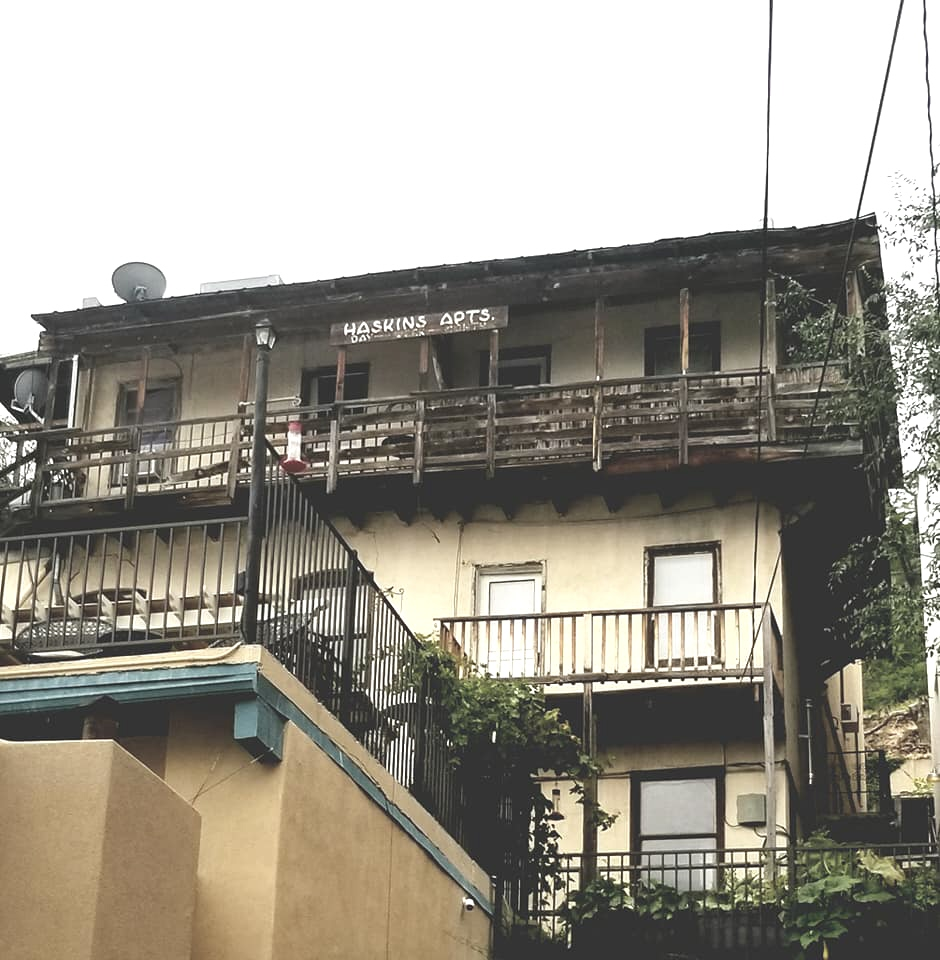
Haskins House/Haskins Apartments

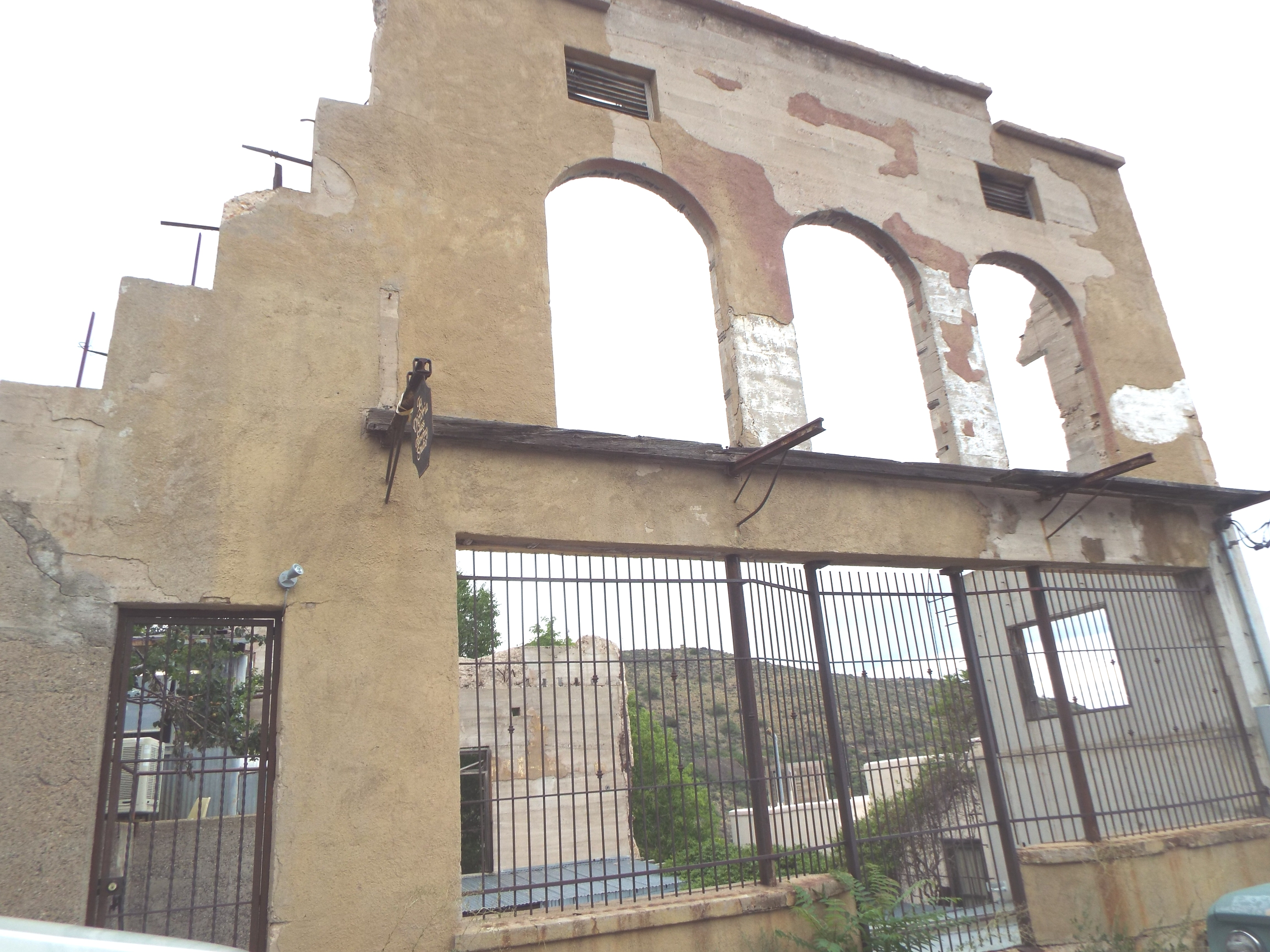
Grocery Store ruins

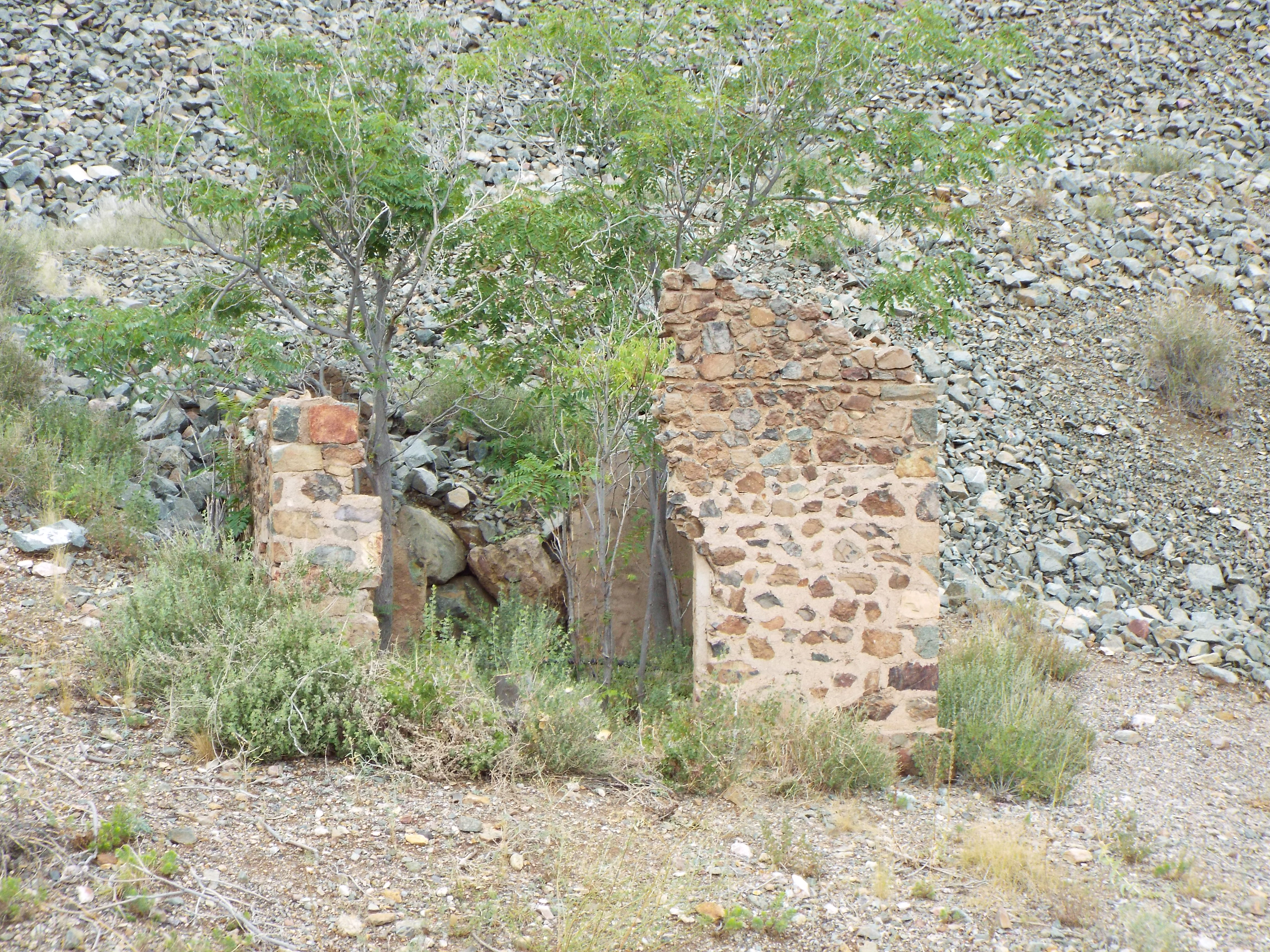
Mine Guard House ruins

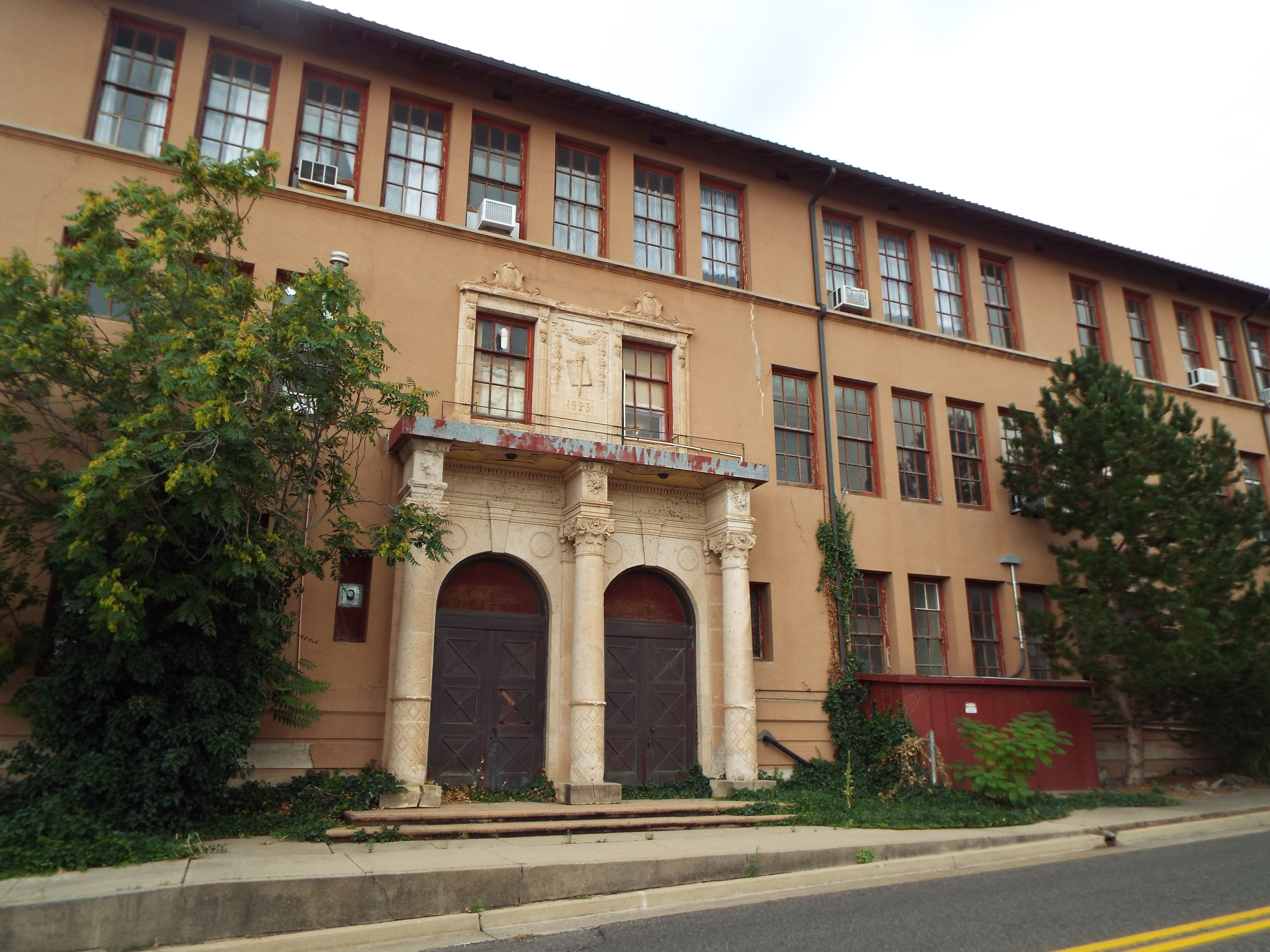
Old Jerome High School

== Houses of Religious Worship ==
- The Haven Methodist Church built in 1927 and located on Main Street.
- The Jerome Episcopal Christ Church was built in 1926 and is located at 407 Clark Street. It is currently used as the archives and administrative offices of the Jerome Historical Society.
- The Powder Box Church building was built in 1939 by Sabino Gonzales with stucco, wire mesh and blasting powder boxes.
Houses of Religious Worship
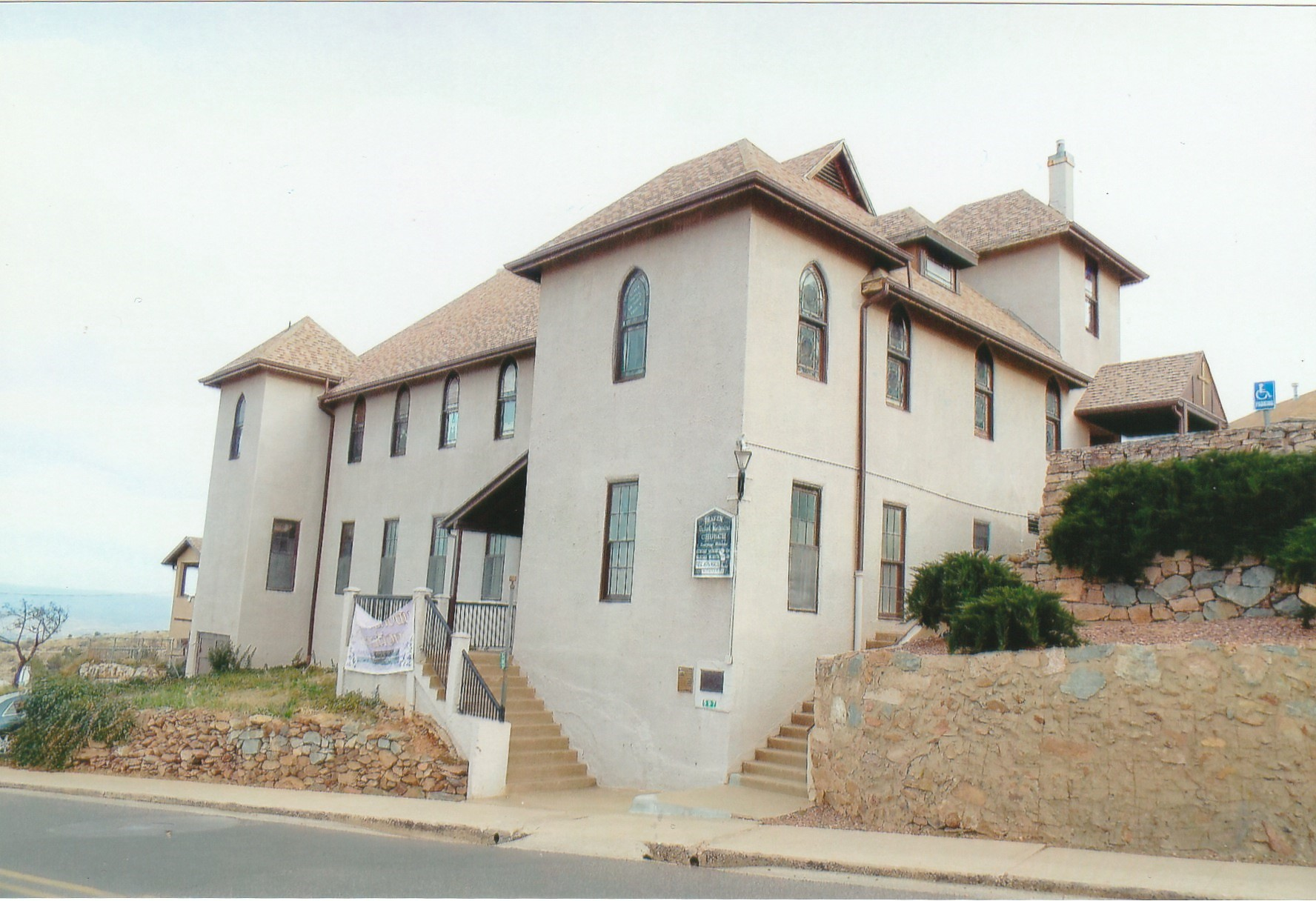
The Haven Methodist Church.

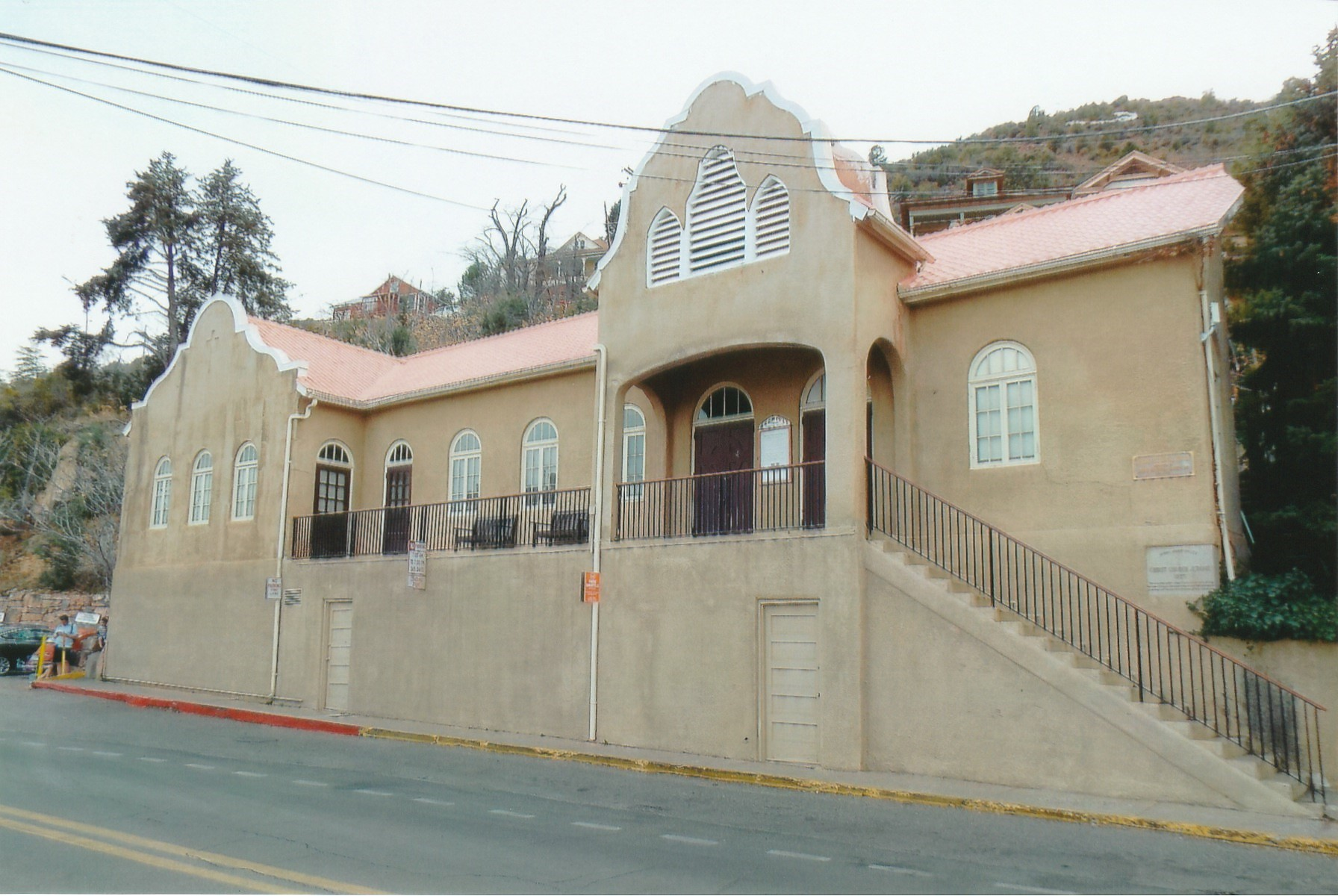
The Jerome Episcopal Christ Church.

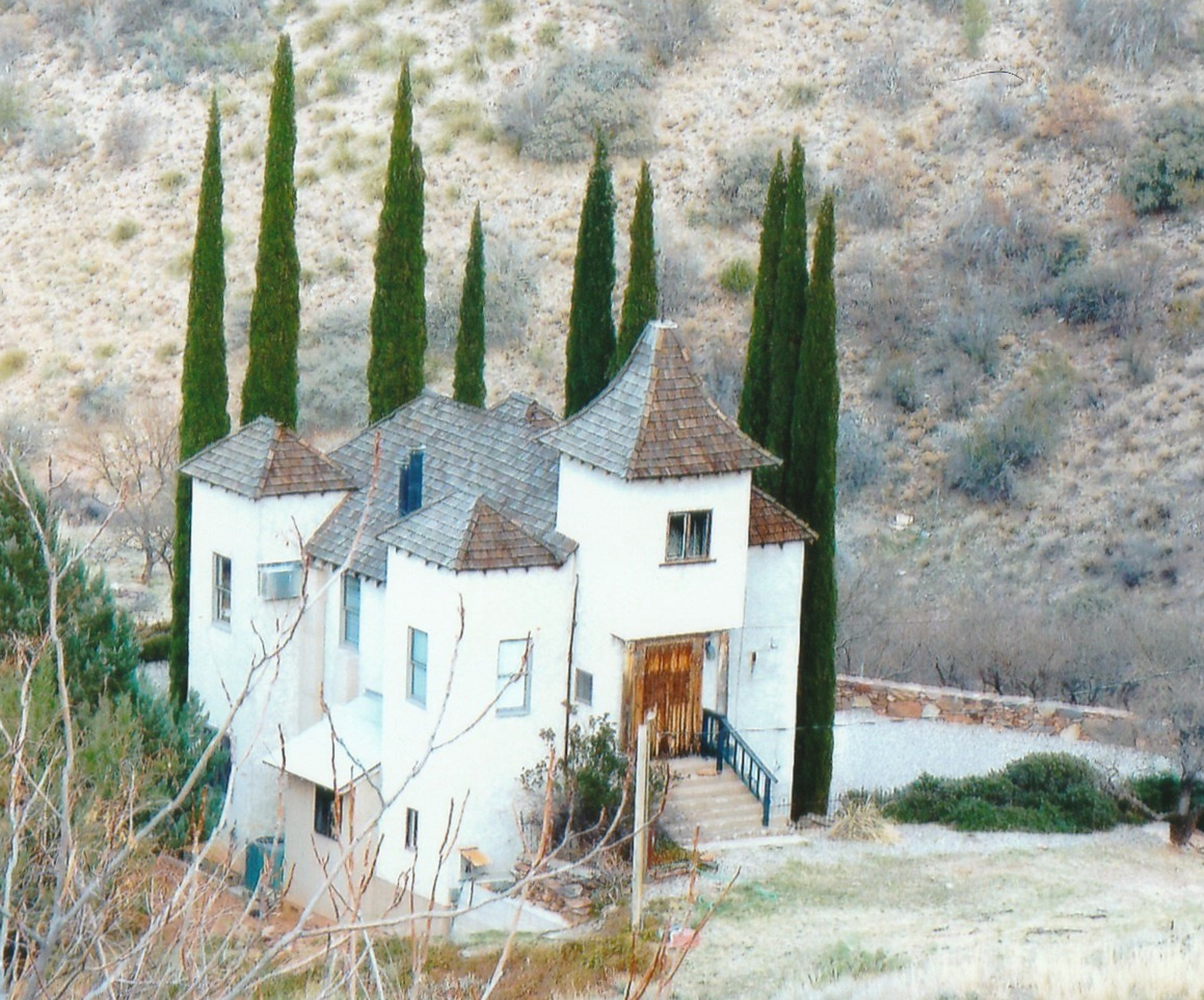
The Powder Box Church.

== The Sliding Jail ==
- The Sliding Jail was built in 1905. It was originally located between Main Street and Hull Ave. The building was pulled apart from the wood structure to which it was attached and in the mid-1930s and began its 225 feet slide to the middle of Hull Ave.
Sliding Jail

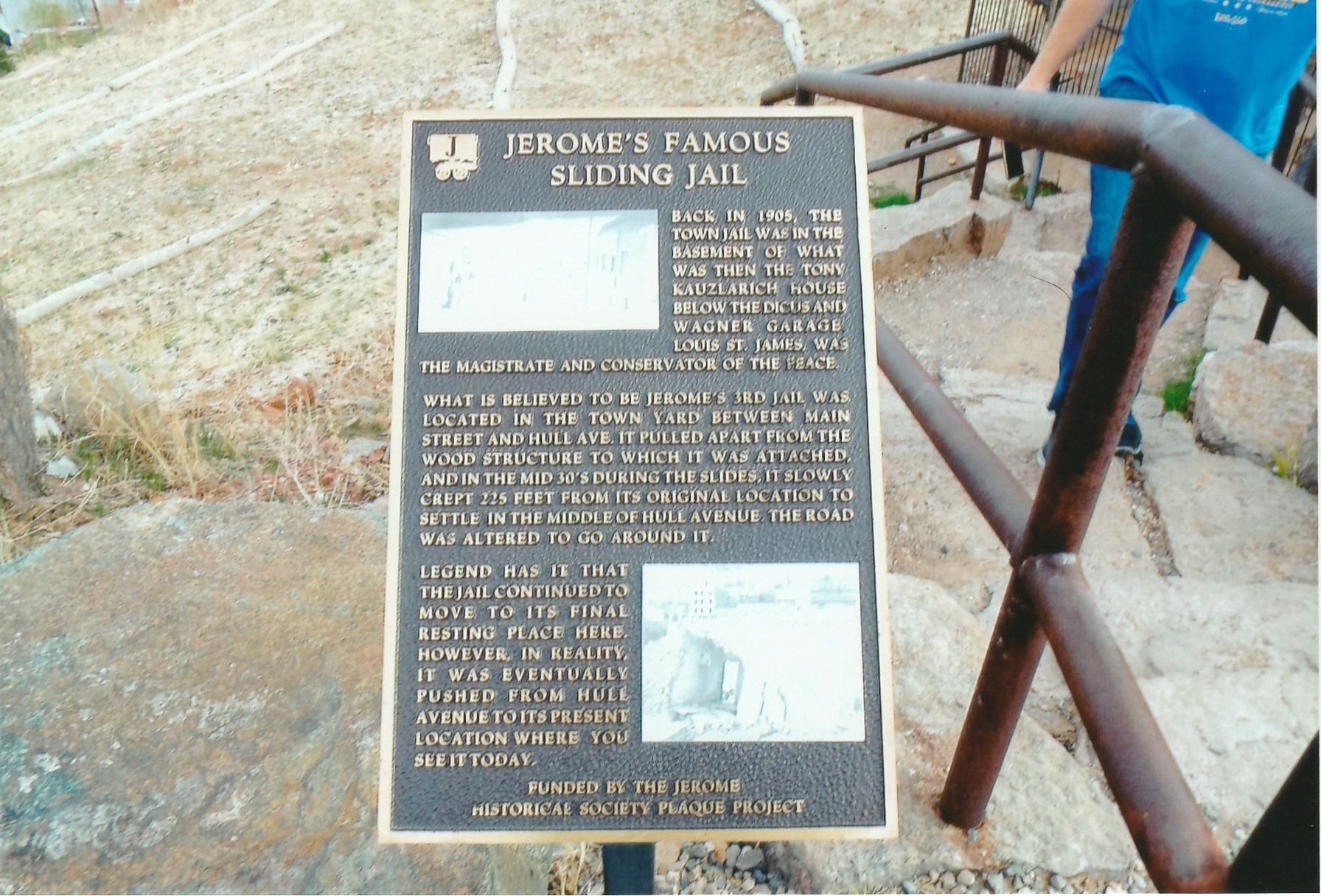
Sliding Jail marker

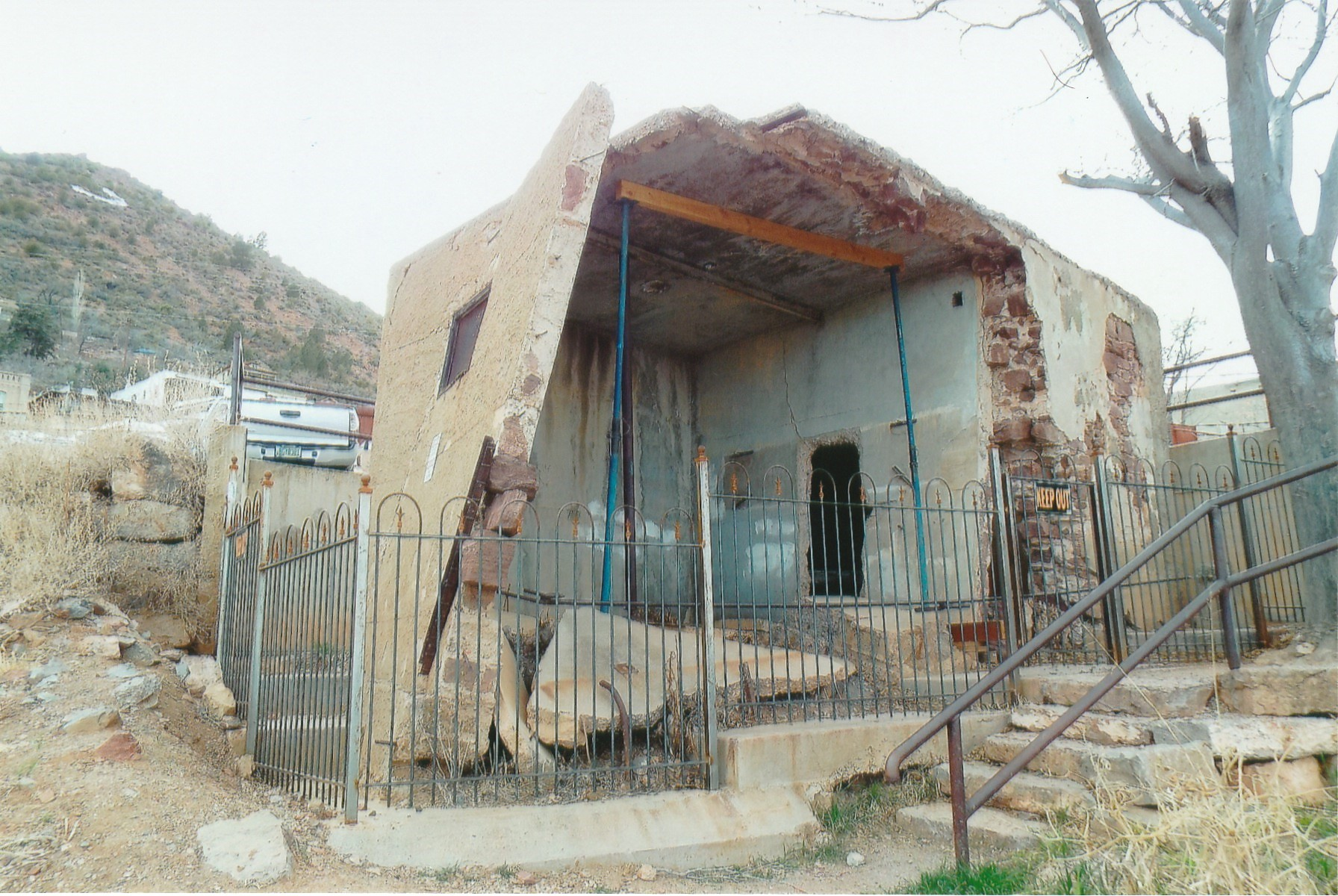
The Sliding Jail.

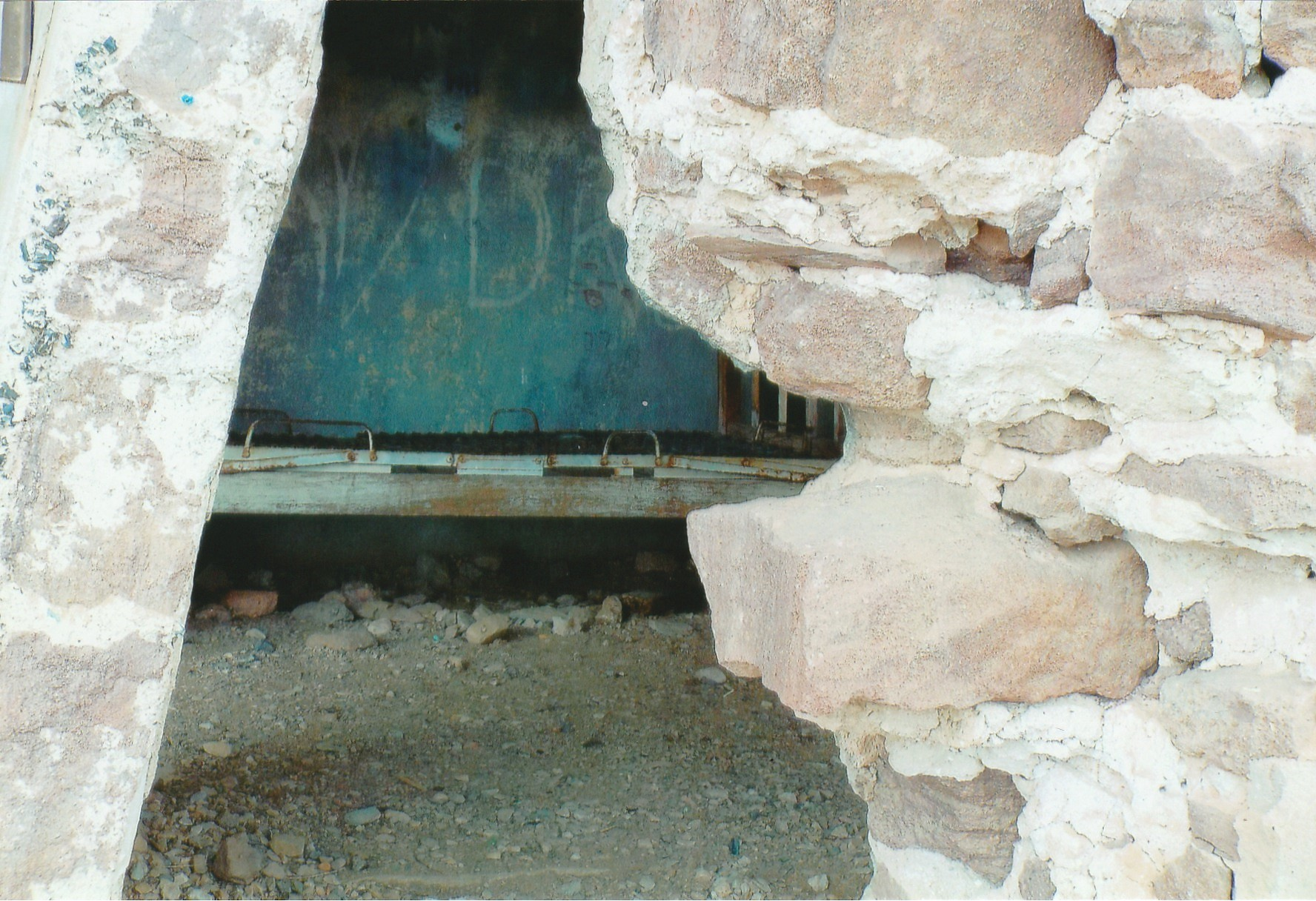
Sliding Jail cell.

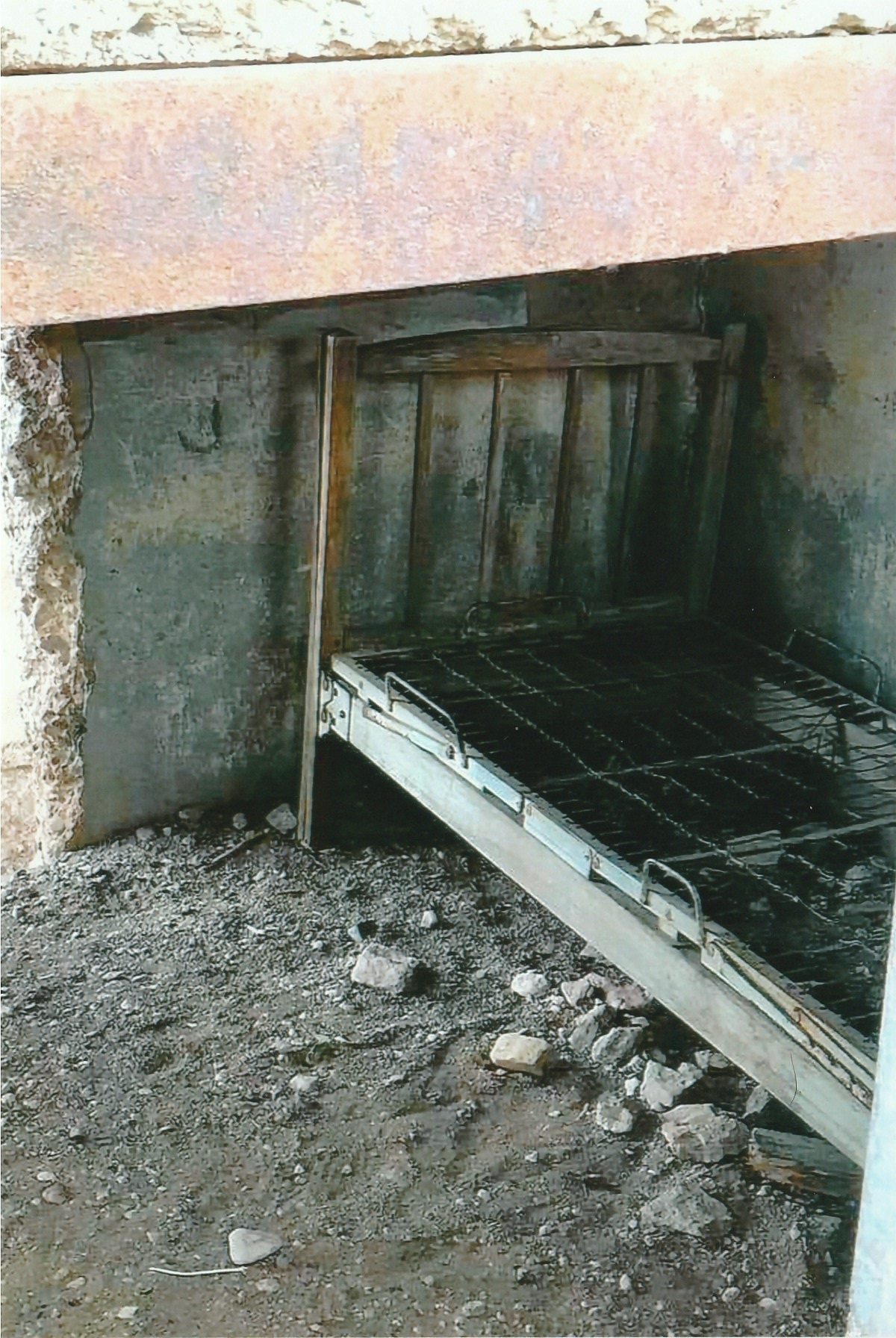
Sliding Jail bunk.

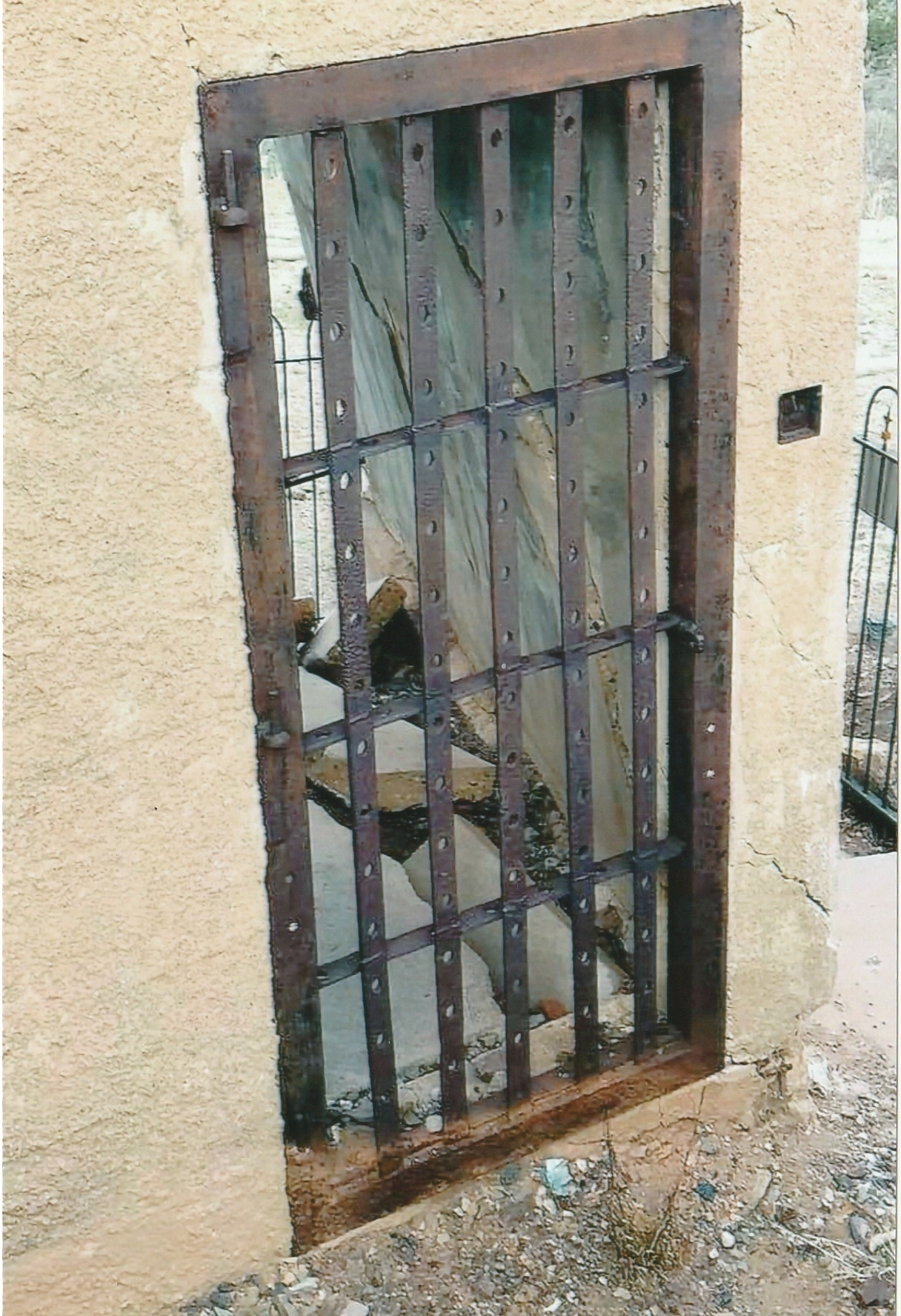
Sliding Jail cell gate.

== Miscellaneous ==
- Audrey Shaft Headframe was built in 1918. It is the largest wooden headframe still standing in Arizona. It is located on the State Park Road.
- The Audrey Shaft and UVX Operations cages – built in 1918.
- Husband's Alley is a 1913 Red Light District located on Hull Ave.
- The Mexican Pool is a 1927 swimming pool and community center built for the workers and families of UVX. It is the first swimming pool in Arizona with lighting.
- The 1898 town Fire Alarm Bell in Main Street.
- Jerome Fire Fighting equipment – 1890.
- The Jerome Blast Furnace is one of two furnaces found in 1888 on the Hampton Lode, United Verde Copper Company Mine by W. A. Clark. Located on 303 Main Street.
- The ruins of the Main Street Primary School – built in 1914 was located in the intersection of Main Street (Arizona Route 89A) and Verde Avenue before it was demolished in 1945.
- The Laura Williams Memorial Park – the land where Laura Williams owned the antique museum which housed numerous artifacts from Jerome.
- The Irving Turbine and Generator and the Turbine and Generator Shed – located in N. Jerome State Mine Museums Road, Jerome AZ The Childs plant was constructed and began operation in 1909. It consisted of three turbine-driven 1,500-kilowatt generators producing a total plant capacity of 4,500 kWh. The Irving plant was added in 1914 in response to the United Verde Company's decision to construct a new smelter in Clarkdale.
- The Rocket Shovel and Dragline – Introduced in 1938 and located at Hampshire Avenue (Arizona Route A89). The Model 12B was the first successful mining device to replace human labor in removing the rubble from underground hard rock-blasting.
Miscellaneous historical items

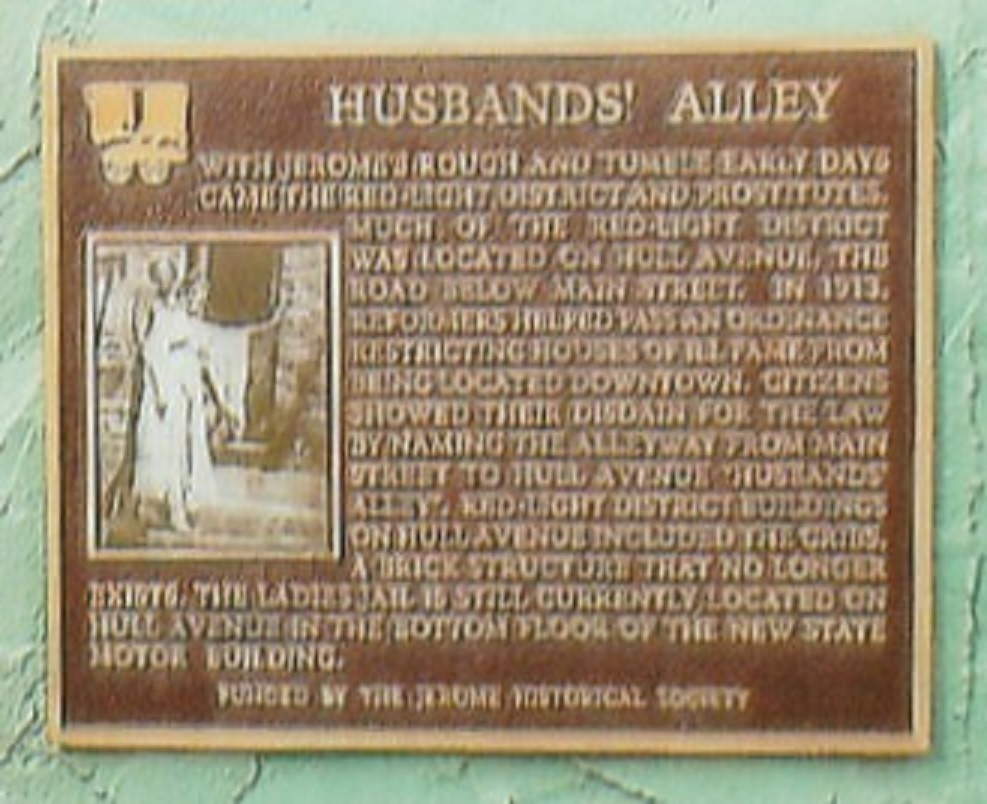
Husbands Alley marker

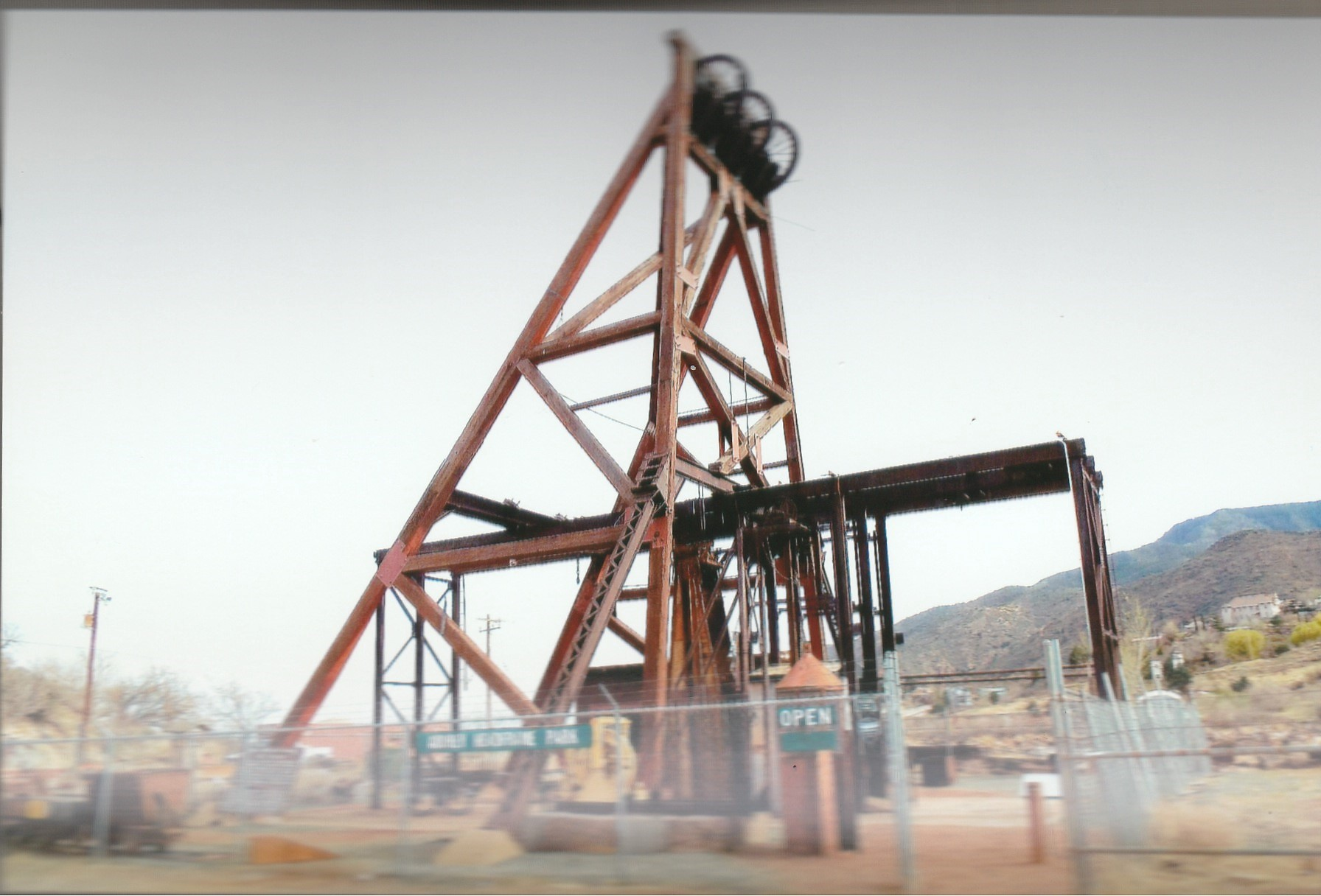
Audrey Shaft Headframe.

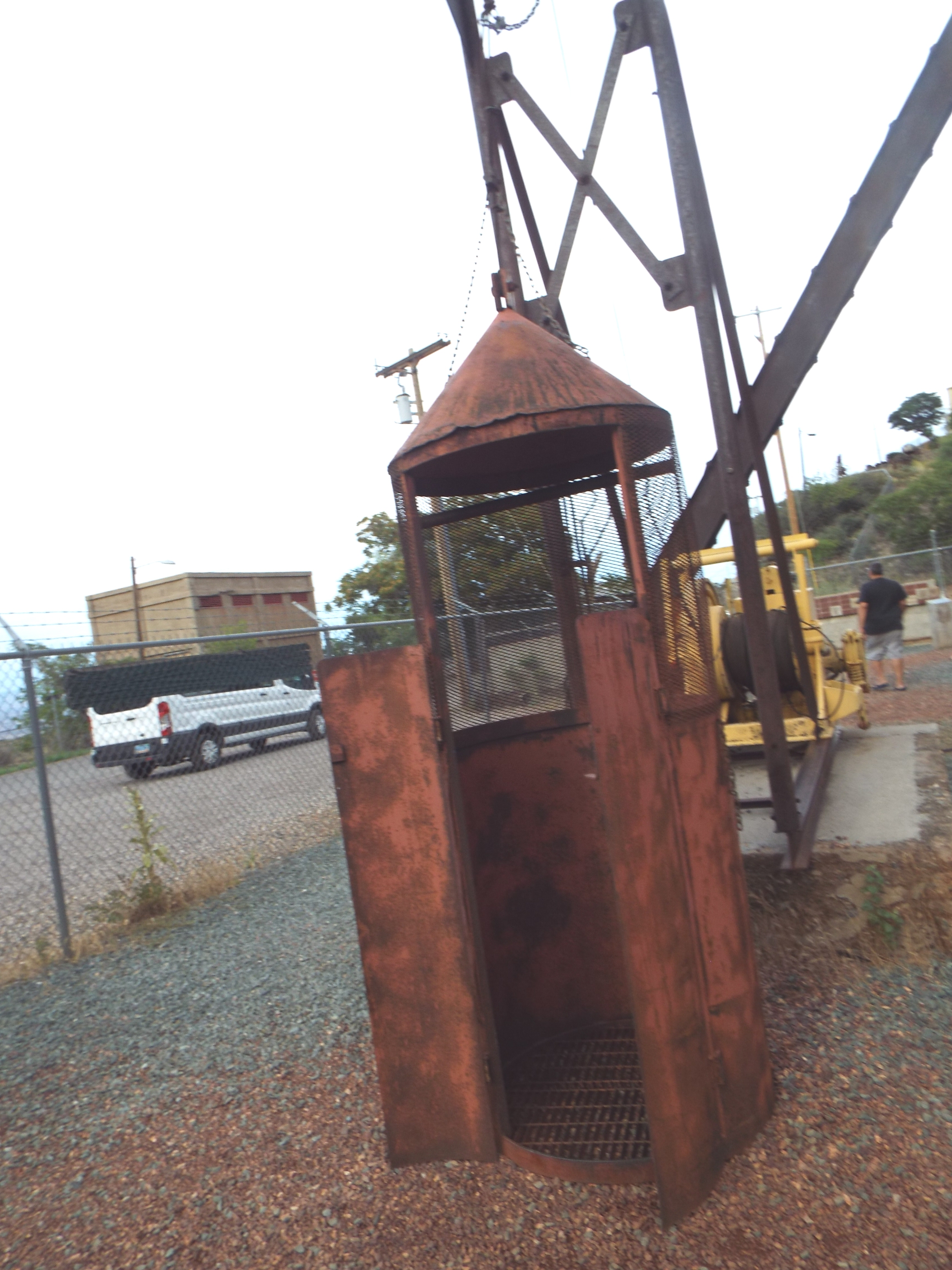
Audrey Shaft and UVX Operations cage

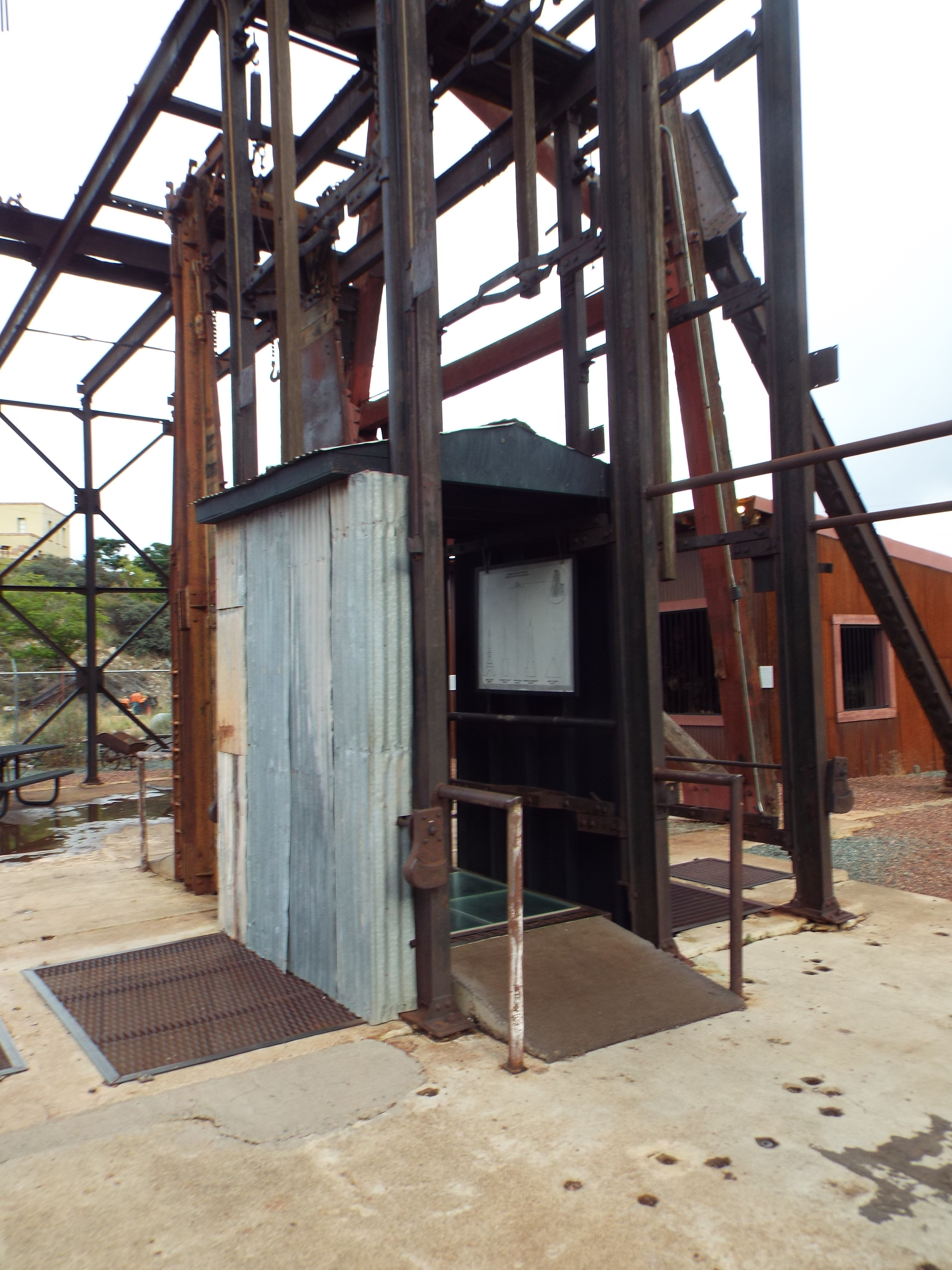
Audrey Shaft and UVX Operations cage

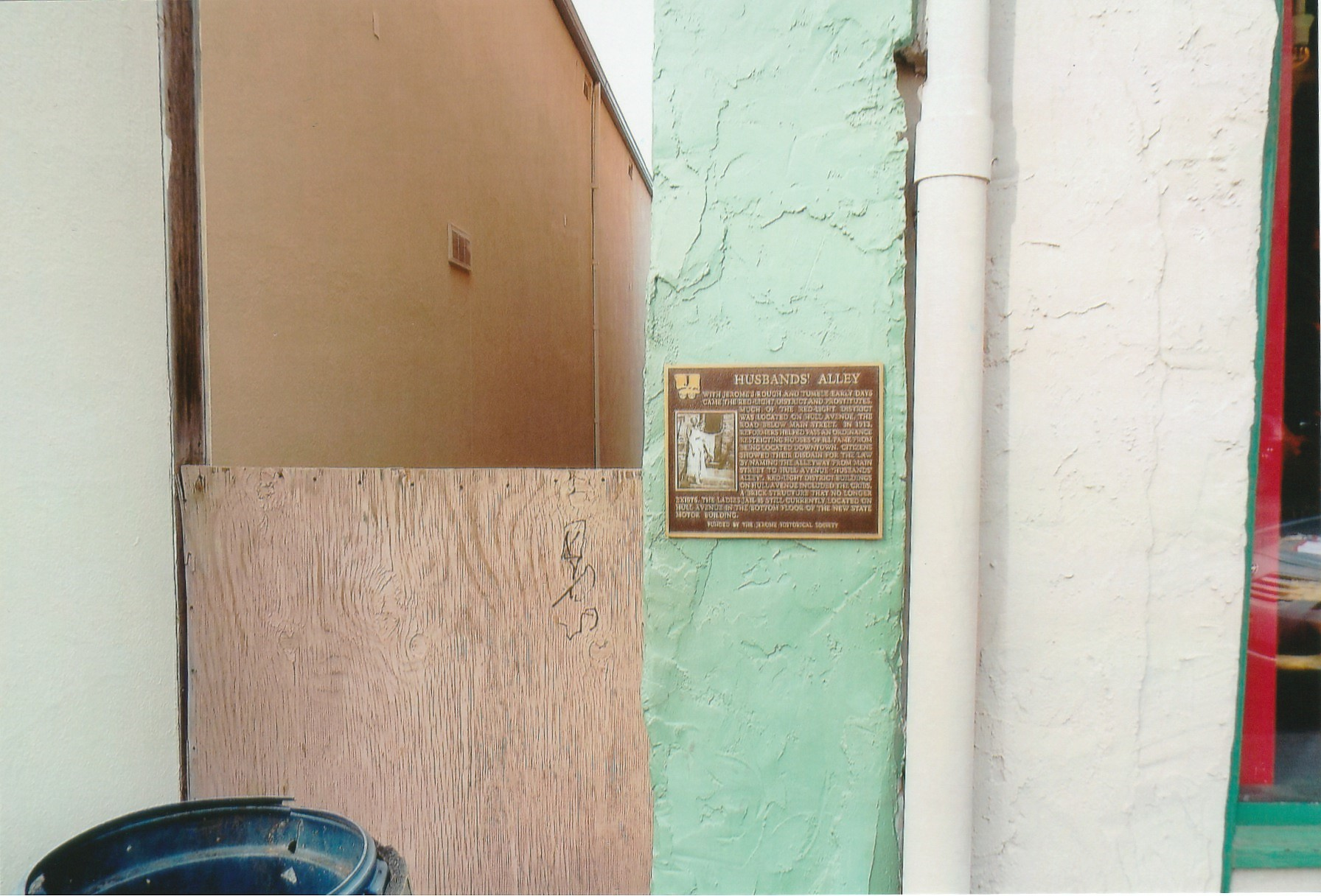
Husband's Alley.

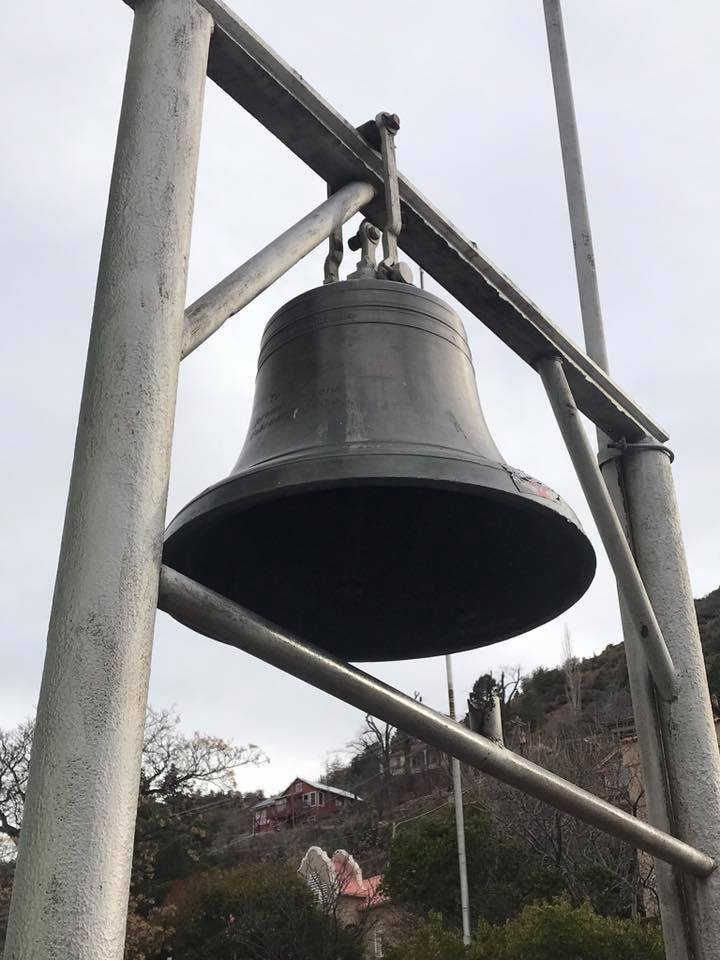
The Town Fire Alarm Bell.

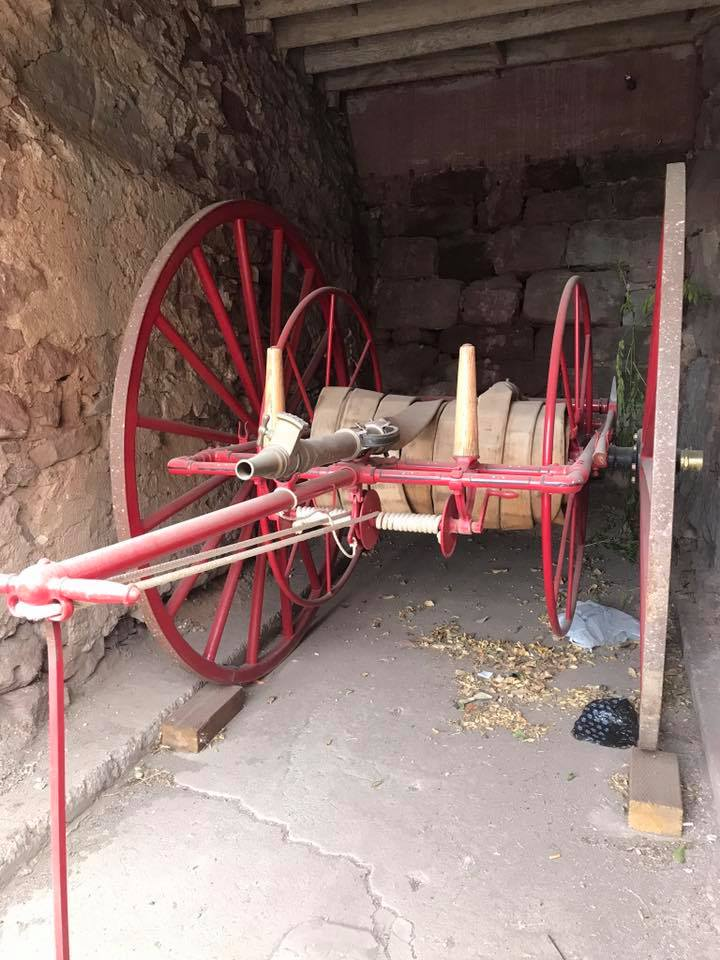
Fire fighting equipment.

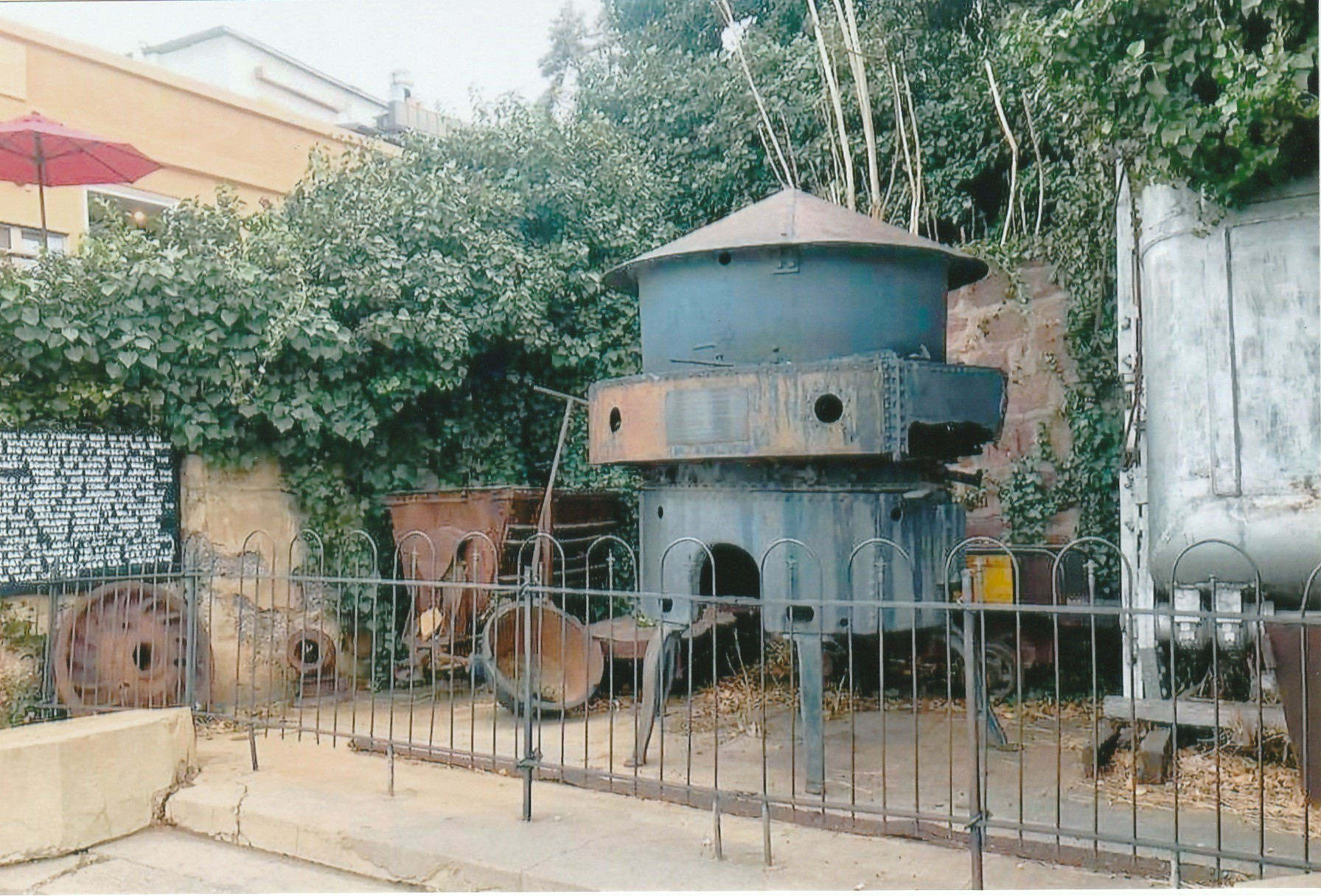
The Jerome Blast Furnance.

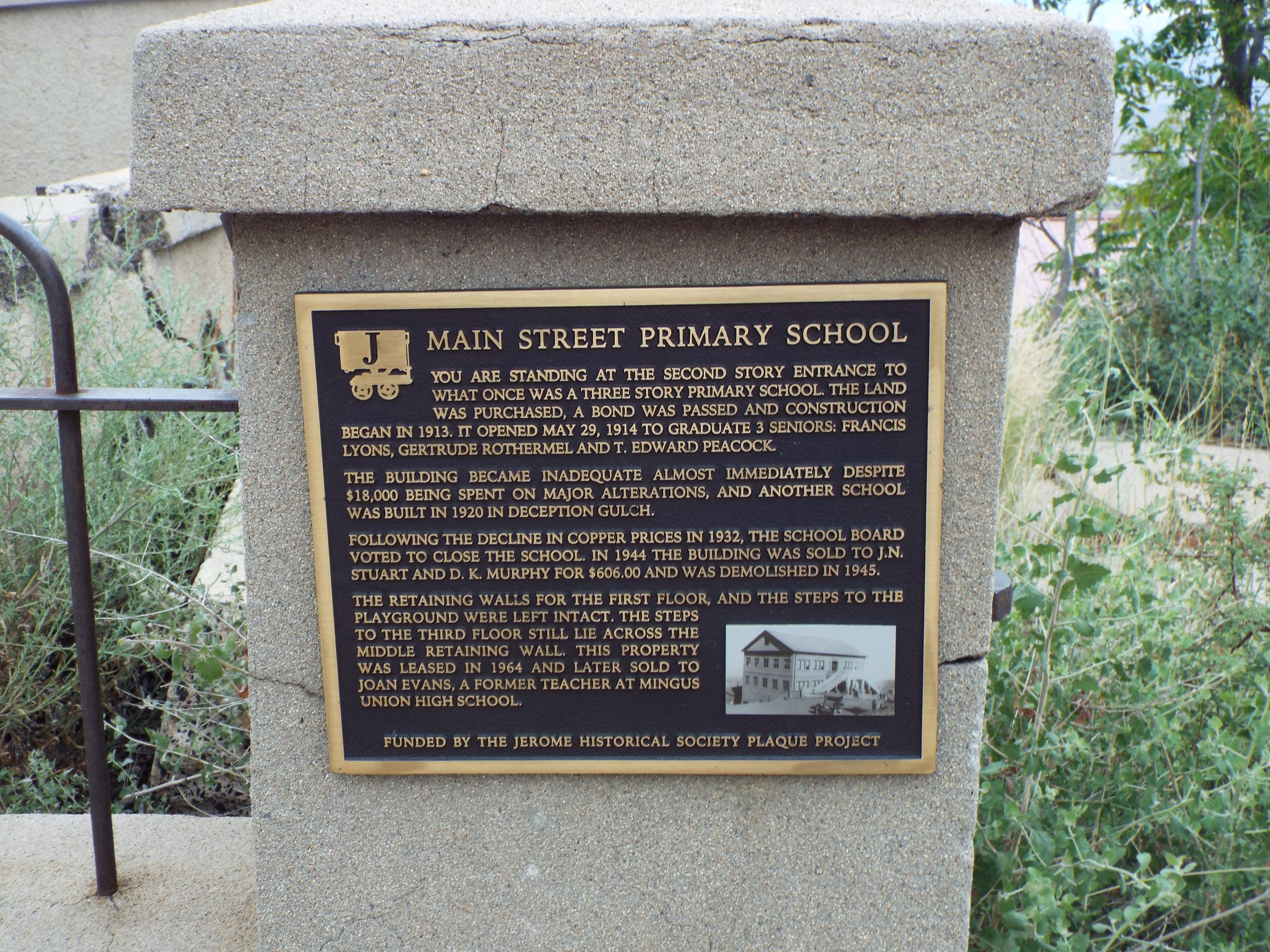
Main Street Primary School marker

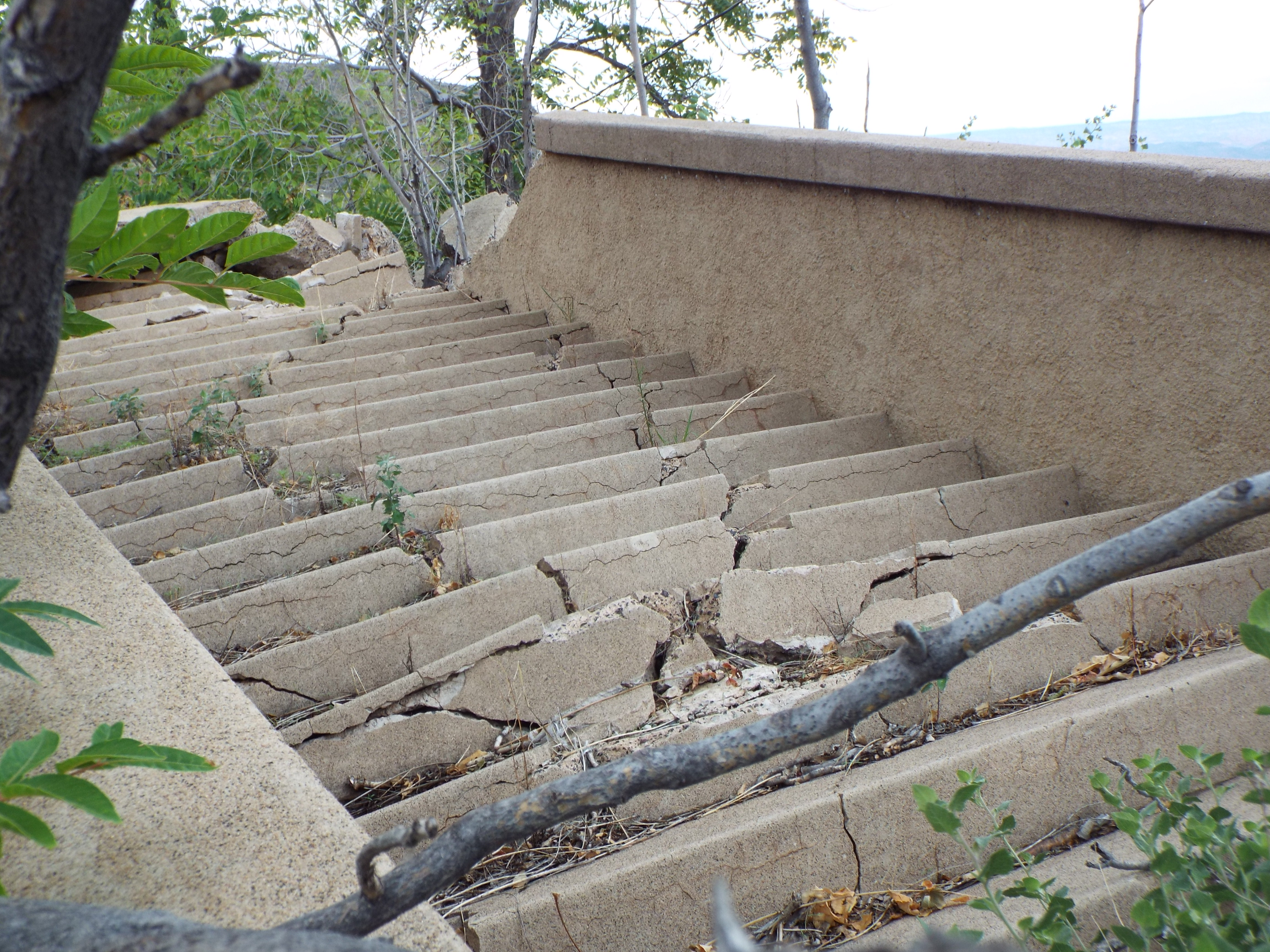
Main Street Primary School third floor stairs

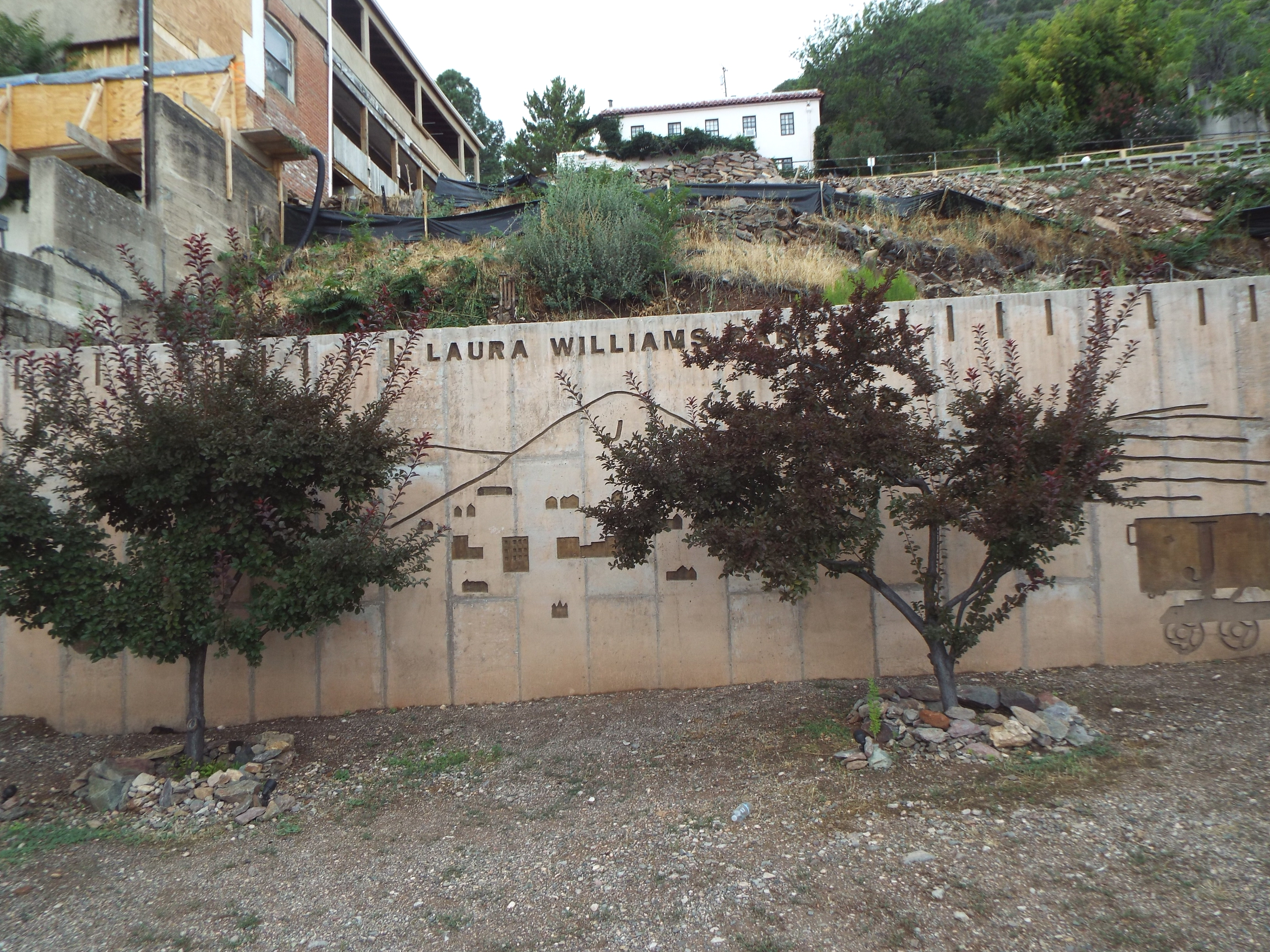
Laura Williams Memorial Park

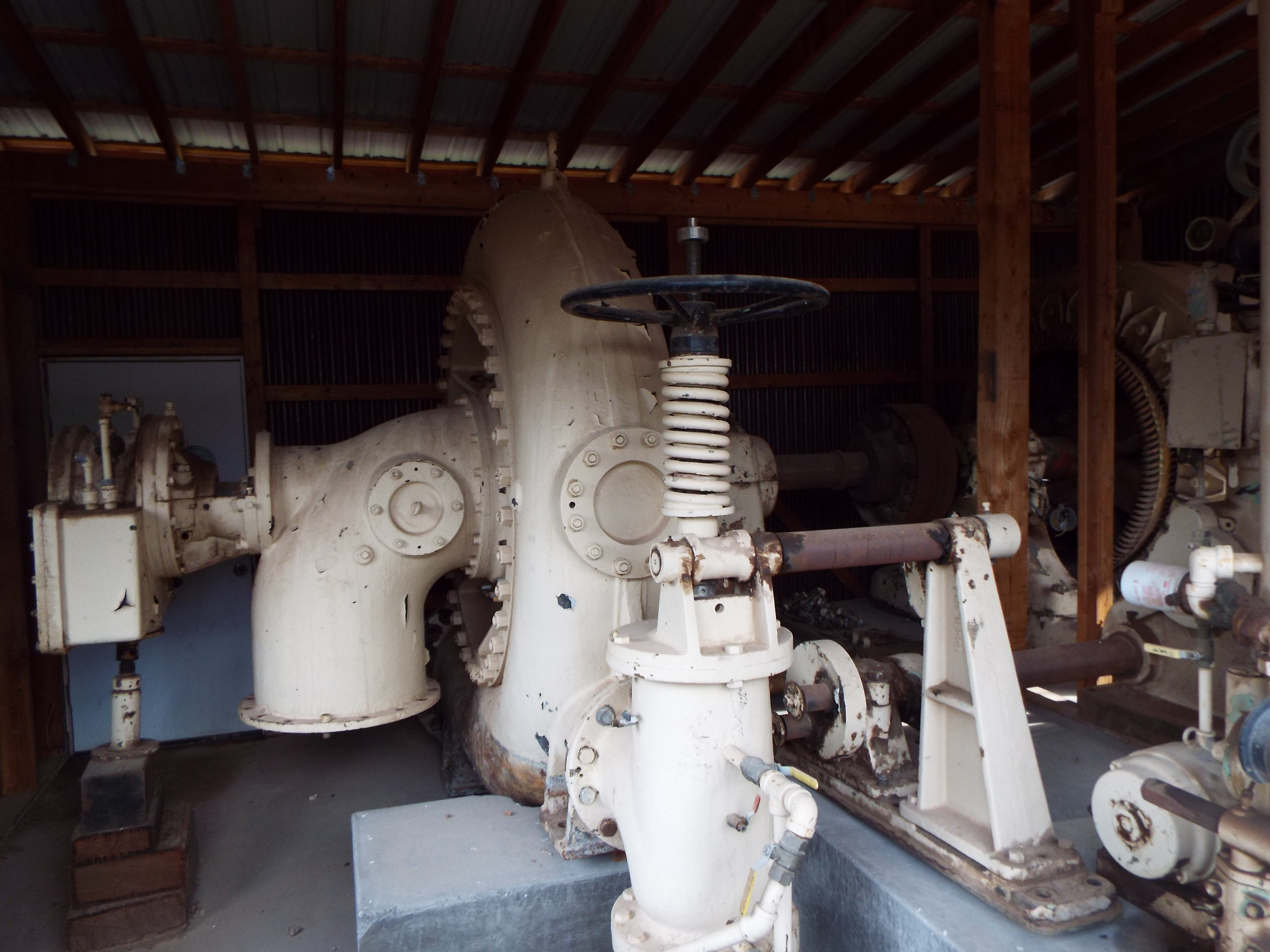
Irving Turbine and Generator

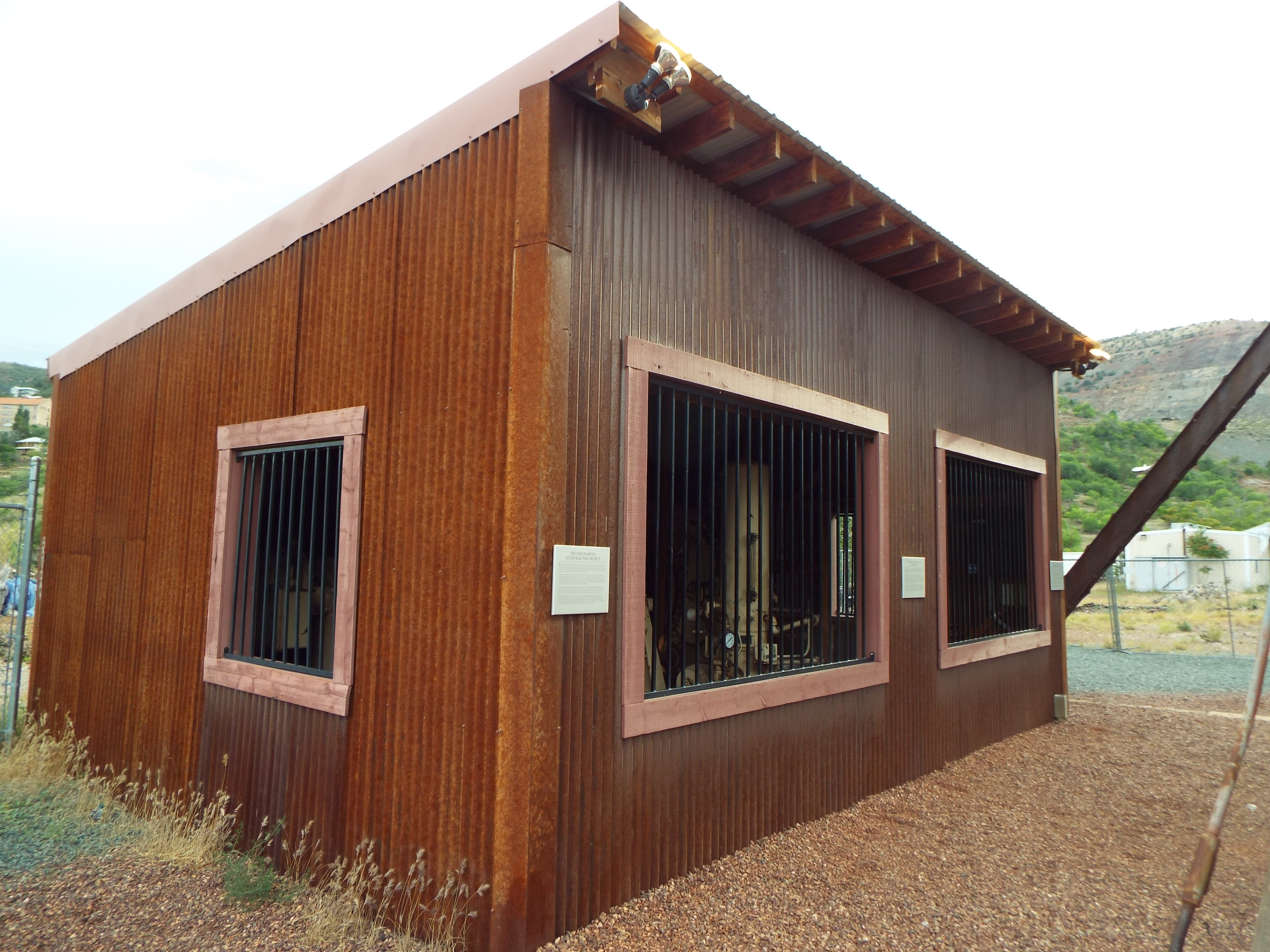
Irving Turbine and Generator shed

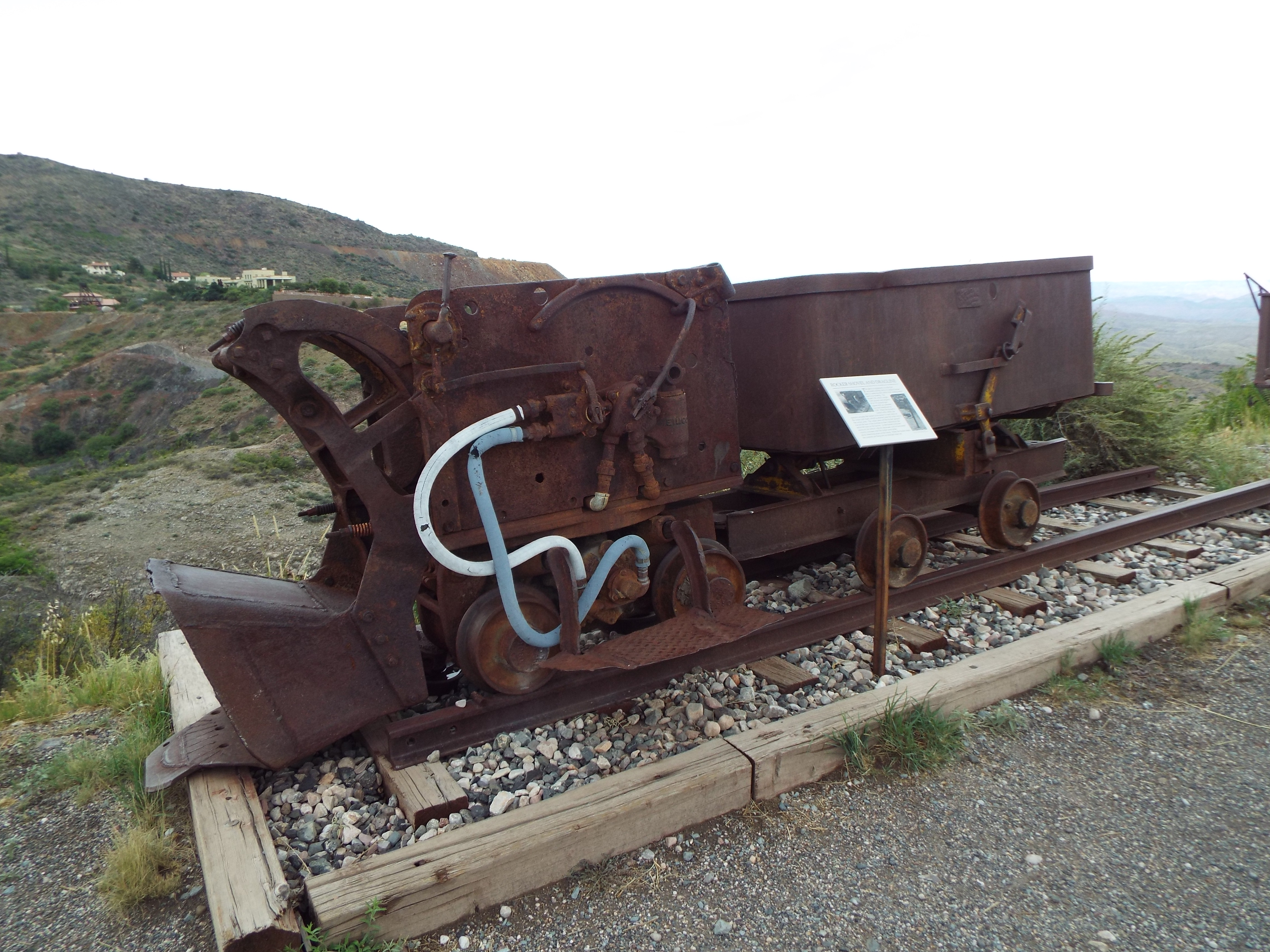
Rocket Shovel and Dragline

== Gold King Mine Ghost Town ==
The Gold King Mine Ghost Town was founded in 1890 The Ghost Town which is located on Perkinsville Road was called “Haynes”. It has mining equipment, a Stamp Mill that was used for crushing the ore and historic buildings which are pictured.

Gold King Mine Ghost Town

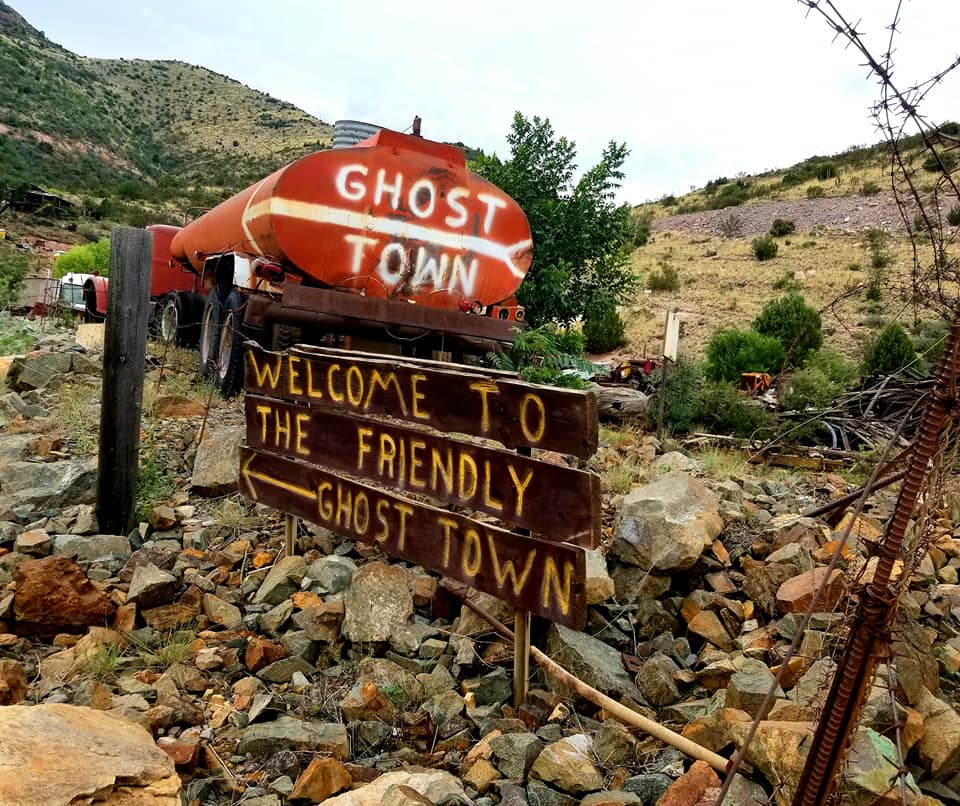
Gold King Mine Ghost Town

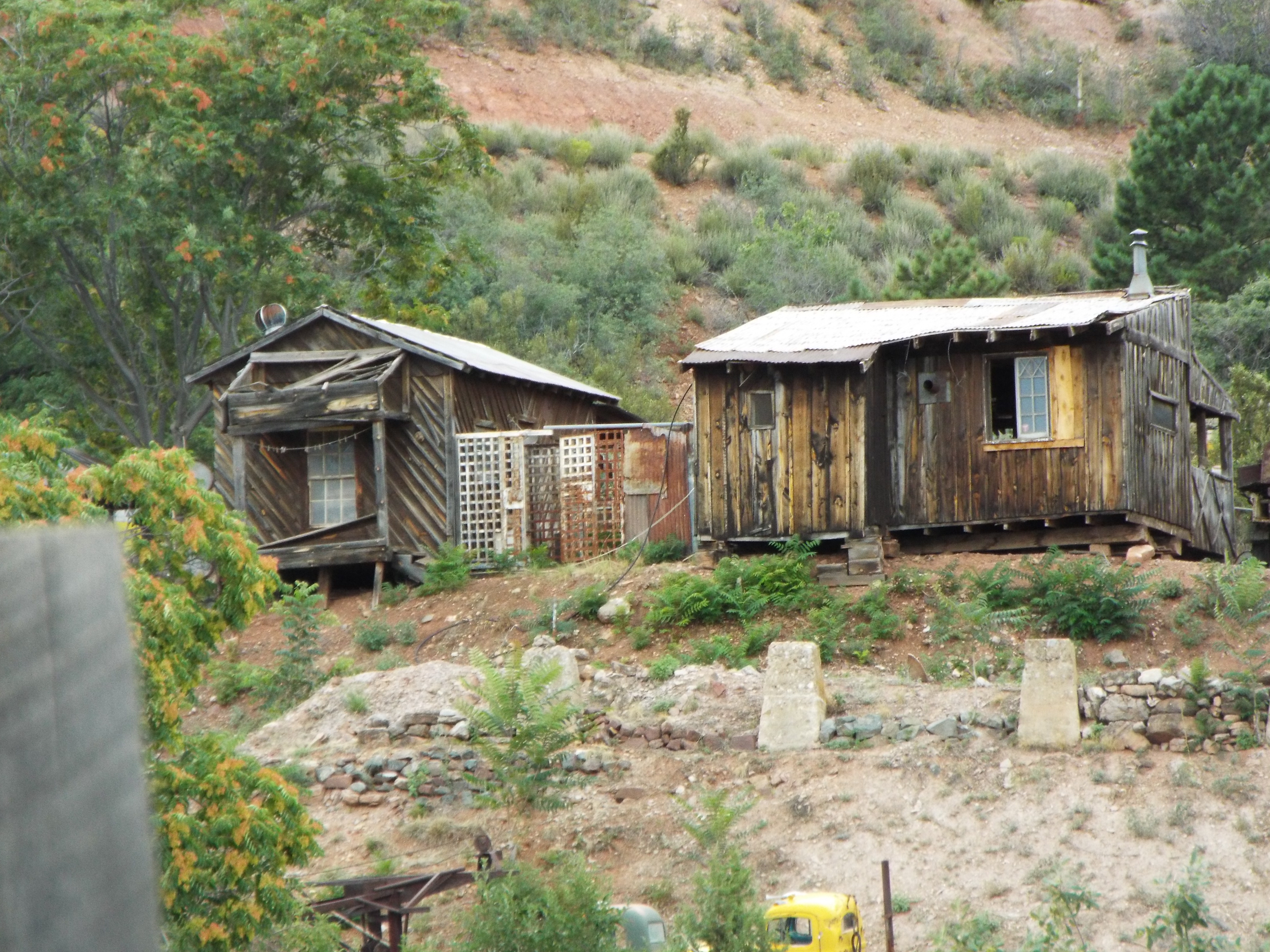
Gold King Mine Ghost Town structures

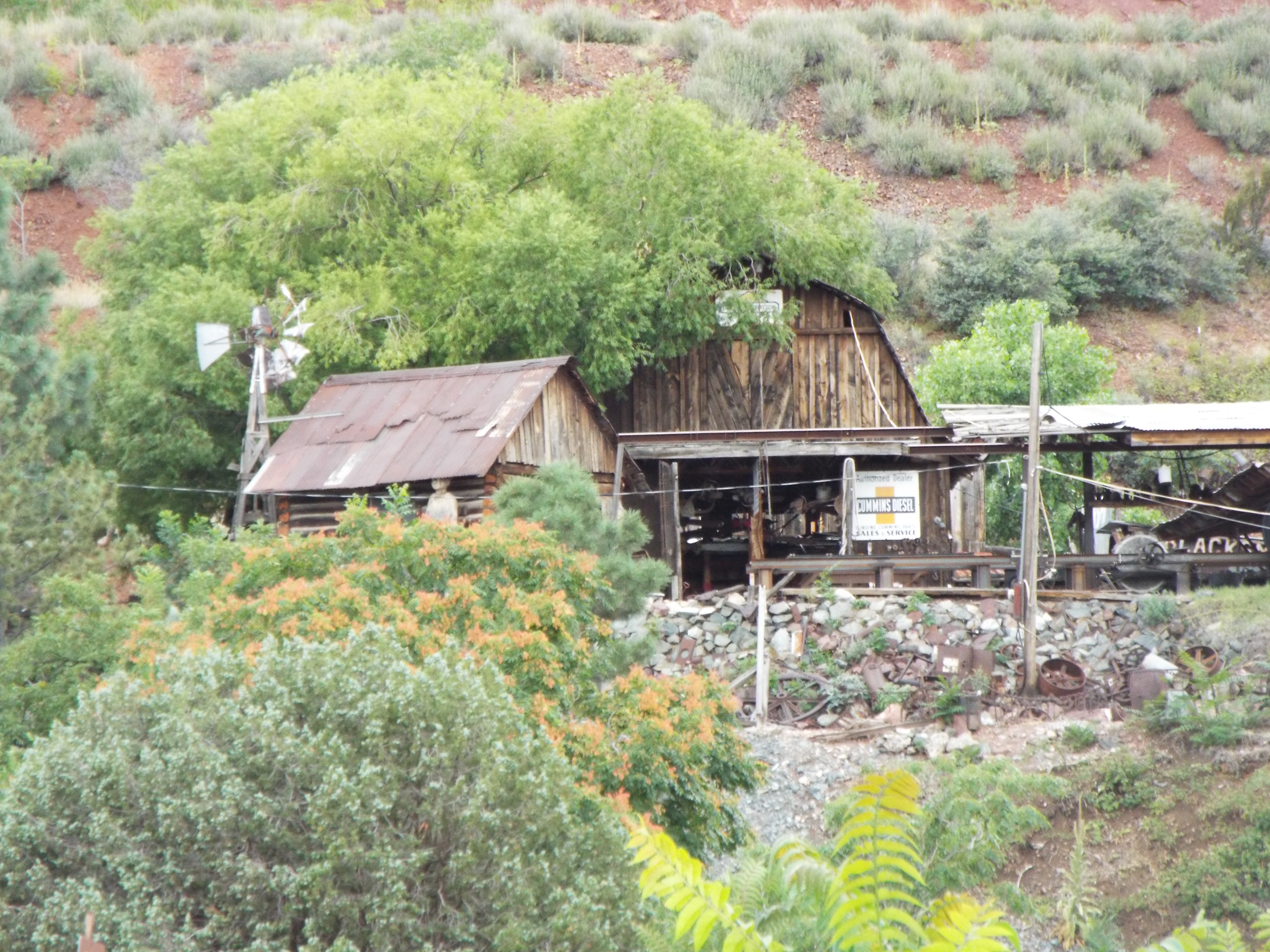
Gold King Mine Ghost Town farm

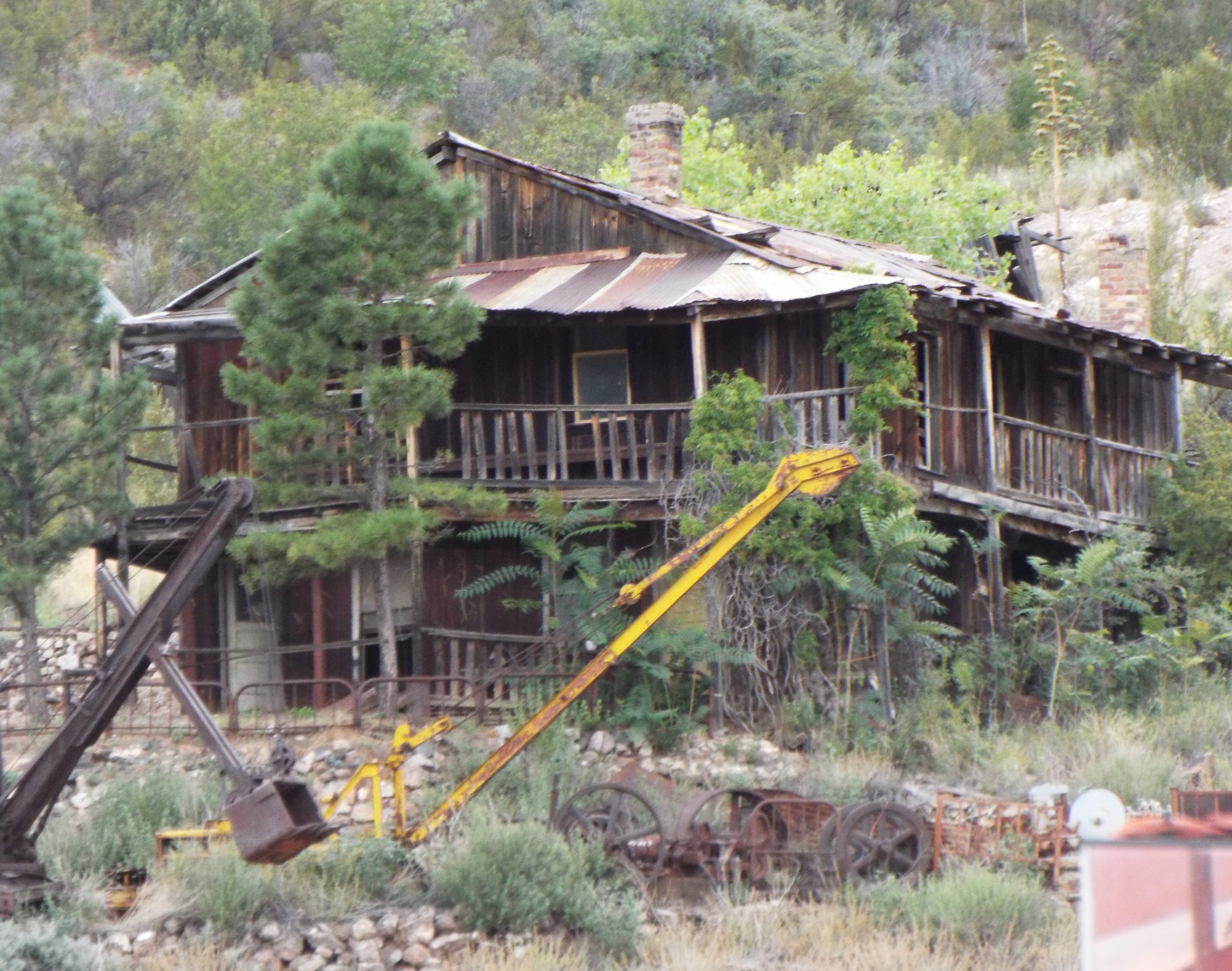
Gold King Mine Ghost Town brothel

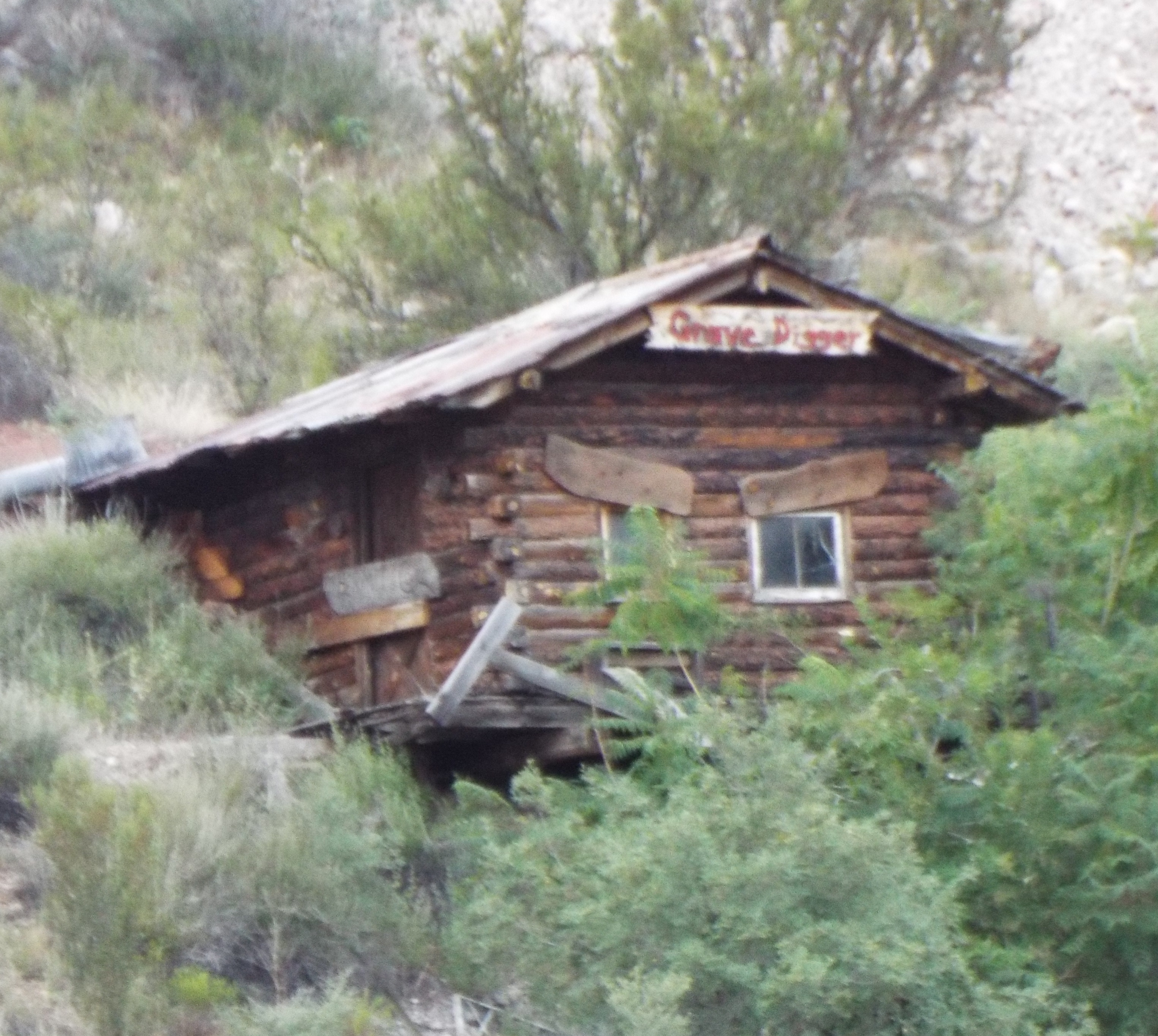
Gold King Mine Ghost Town grave diggers house

== Not pictured ==
The property, which according to the Historical Marker Database, is historical but, is not pictured is the Gibson Market building – built in 1917 and located at 681 Hampshire Avenue. The abandoned Jerome Cemetery is near Route 89A past the Jerome Union High School.

== See also ==
- Jerome Grand Hotel
- Jerome State Historic Park
- National Register of Historic Places listings in Yavapai County, Arizona

== Sources ==
- Abbott, Lon; Cook, Terri (2007). Geology Underfoot in Northern Arizona. Missoula, MT: Mountain Press Publishing. ISBN 978-0878425280.
- Clements, Eric L. (2003). After the Boom in Tombstone and Jerome, Arizona: Decline in Western Resource Towns. Reno: University of Nevada Press. ISBN 978-0874175714.
- Steuber, Midge (2008). Images of America: Jerome. Charleston, SC: Arcadia Publishing. ISBN 978-0738558820.
