= Clemenceau, Cottonwood =

Neighborhood in Cottonwood, Arizona, US

Clemenceau, Arizona
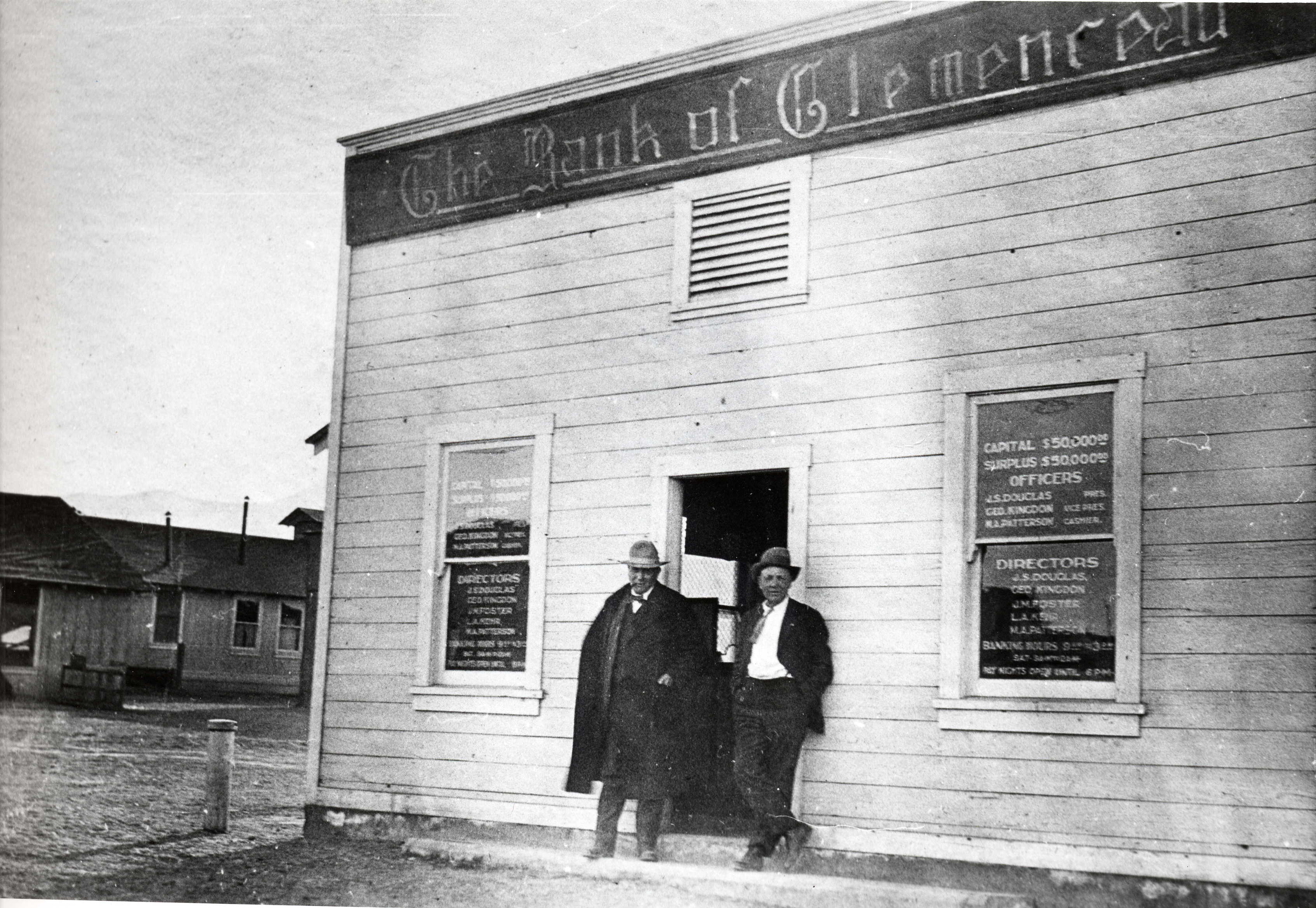
- The Bank of Clemenceau, founded 1918. The bank building is preserved on the grounds of the Clemenceau Heritage Museum.

- Location within Arizona
- Coordinates: 34°43′55″N 112°01′36″W
- Country: United States
- State: Arizona
- County: Yavapai
- Elevation: 3,471 ft (1,058 m)
- Time zone: UTC-7 (MST (no DST))

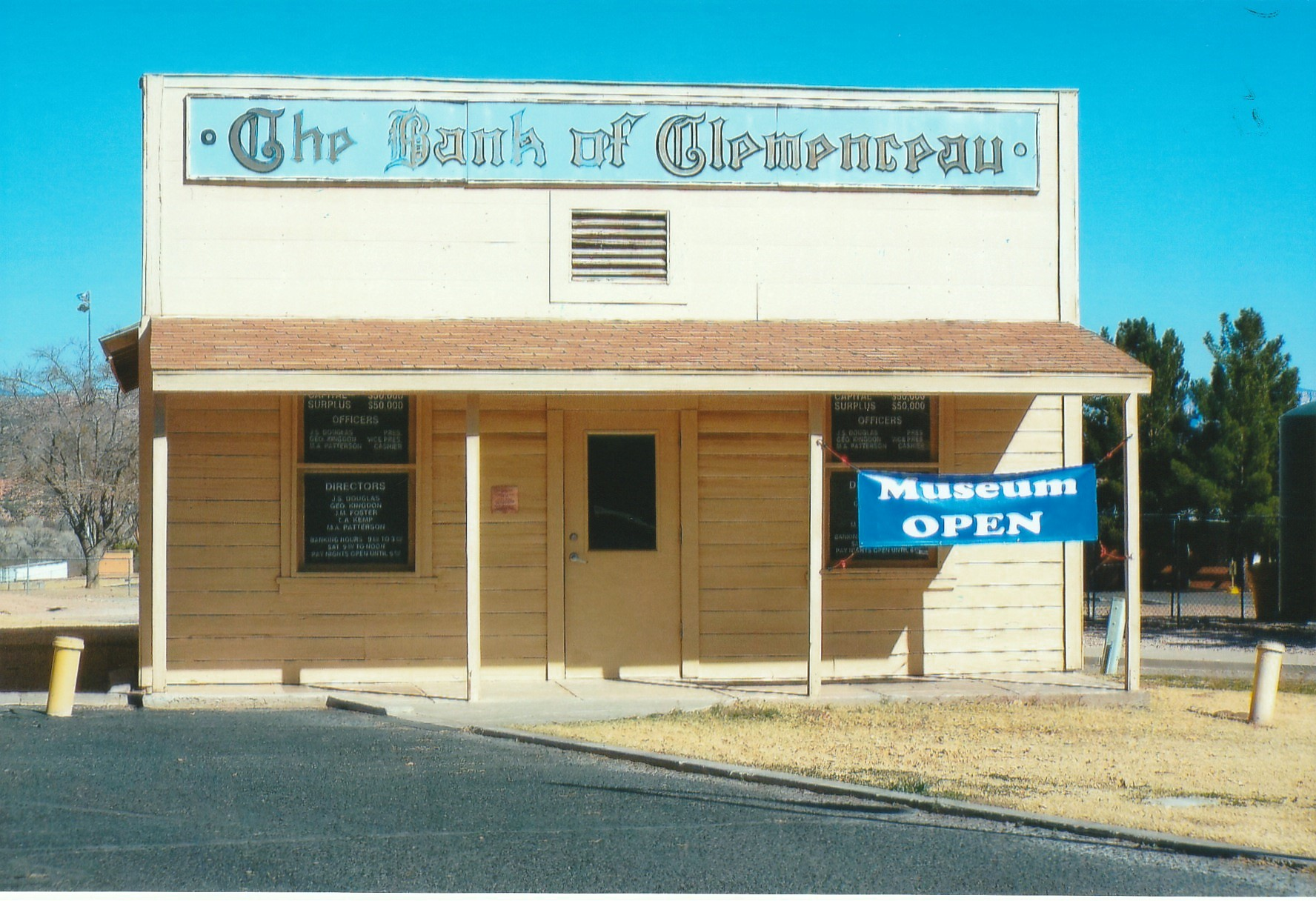
Bank of Clemenceau 2018

Clemenceau is a neighborhood of the city of Cottonwood in Yavapai County, Arizona, United States. It was built as a company town in 1917 to serve the new smelter for James Douglas, Jr.'s United Verde Extension Mine (UVX) in Jerome. The town was originally named Verde after the mine, but it was changed to Clemenceau in 1920 in honor of the French premier in World War I, Georges Clemenceau, a personal friend of Douglas. Clemenceau would later leave a vase designed by the French potter Ernest Chaplet to the town in return.

== History ==
Originally named Verde, the town was renamed Clemenceau in 1920, both to honor Georges Clemenceau and to avoid possible confusion with nearby Camp Verde. Though now a part of the city of Cottonwood, Verde as it was known had its own post office and station on the Clarkdale branch of the Atchison, Topeka & Santa Fe Railroad. "Actual construction of Verde, the United Verde Extension's smelter town in the valley, will probably be under way by January 1," the Jerome News reported on November 9, 1917. "The company will not begin work on its proposed Hogback town, at the east edge of Jerome, before summer at the earliest, and probably not then. So stated General Manager George Kingdon today in a general discussion of the U. V. Extension building plans."

The smelter town had homes for workers, a school, bank, and a clubhouse, and its population varied between 1,000 and 5,000. To deliver ore to the smelter from Jerome, Douglas built the Arizona-Extension Railway, a two-branch shortline railroad. The western branch ran between Clemenceau and the eastern portal of the 2.5-mile (4.0 km) Josephine Tunnel, which connected to the UVX Mine. The eastern branch ran between Clemenceau and Clarkdale.

On July 16, 1918, Verde was the scene of a violent confrontation when a handful of Mexican laborers collided with area lawmen attempting to enforce the War Department's so called "work or fight order" during World War I. Former Yavapai County Sheriff James R. Lowry, then serving as a deputy sheriff at the smelter, was shot and killed during the incident. His assailant was later killed during an exchange of gunfire with an off-duty peace officer near Camp Verde.

The Clemenceau smelter closed in 1937. Most residents then left the area. When Cottonwood was incorporated in 1960, Clemenceau and the Clemenceau Airport were included in its boundaries.

With the exception of the school, the bank/post office and the smelter slag pile, little remains of the original town of Clemenceau. A largely invisible remnant is the Clemenceau Water Company, which still serves the area of the old town of Clemenceau. The town of Cottonwood bought the company in 2004, but it still operates as a separate entity, as of 2006.

== Clemenceau Heritage Museum ==
The Clemenceau Heritage Museum occupies most of the old Clemenceau School, which operated from 1924 through 1986. The 1918 Clemenceau Bank and Post Office building is also part of the museum. The museum has displays on mining, ranching, and farming in the Verde Valley, and preserves archives and artifacts from the area. An elaborate working model-railroad display depicts the nine railroads that once operated in the region.

== Douglas and Clemenceau ==
James Douglas, Jr., bought an apartment in Paris for his friend, Georges Clemenceau, in 1926, for his retirement home. This building later became the Musée Clemenceau.

== Notable residents and visitors ==
Jack Frye's personal airplane, a TWA Lockheed Model 10 Electra with tail number NC18137, was frequently based at the Clemenceau Airport. Frye had a vacation ranch near Sedona, now Red Rock State Park.
