= James Douglas (businessman) =

Mining engineer and businessman (1837–1918)

James Walter Douglas
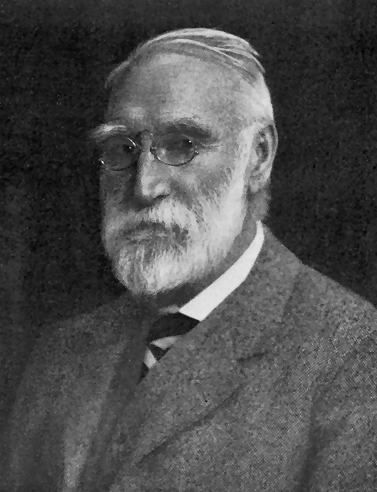
- Born: 4 November 1837; Quebec City, Lower Canada
- Died: 25 June 1918 (aged 80); Manhattan, New York, United States
- Education: University of Halle-Wittenberg; University of Edinburgh; Queen's University; Université Laval
- Spouse: Naomi Douglas
- Children: 6, including James Douglas Jr.
- Parent(s): James Douglas (father) (1800–1886); Elizabeth Ferguson (mother)
- Relatives: Lewis Douglas (grandson)

Signature
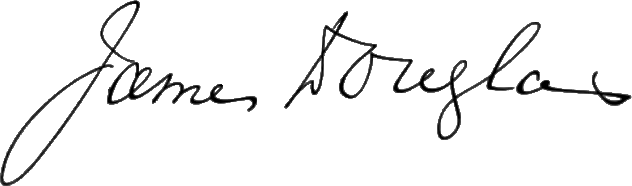

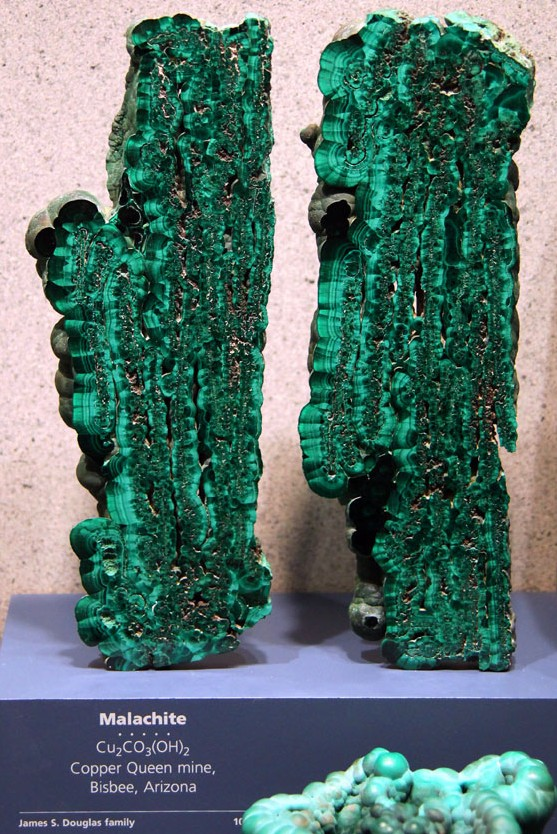
Malachite specimen from the Copper Queen Mine, Bisbee, Arizona. Douglas saved many of the best mineral specimens from the Copper Queen for his personal collection. His family later donated many of them to the Smithsonian.

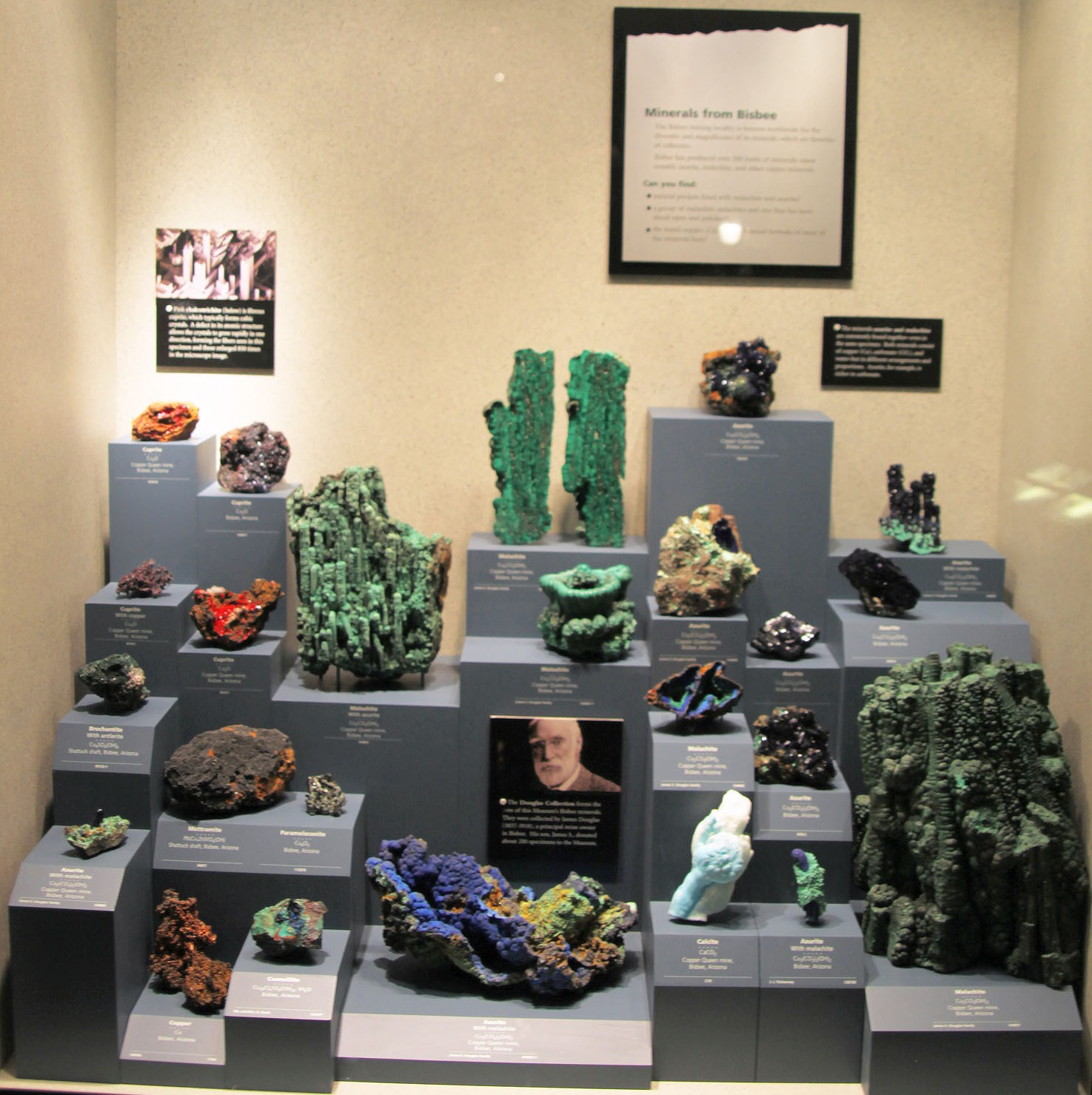
The Smithsonian display of Copper Queen minerals from Dr. Douglas' collection

James Walter Douglas (4 November 1837 – 25 June 1918) was a British North America born mining engineer and businessman who introduced a number of metallurgical innovations in copper mining and amassed a fortune through the copper mining industry of Bisbee, Arizona Territory, and Sonora before and after the turn of the 20th century.

== Life ==
James Walter Douglas Jr. was born in Quebec City, Lower Canada, on 4 November 1837. His father James Douglas Sr., a native of Scotland, was a surgeon and manager of the Beauport Lunatic Asylum. His mother, Elizabeth Ferguson, was also a native of Scotland. James Douglas graduated from Queen's College, Kingston, Province of Canada in 1858 and continued his studies at the University of Edinburgh. He studied both medicine and theology with the intent of becoming a minister but was never ordained. For several years he served as professor of chemistry at Morrin College, Province of Canada, and in 1864 became managing director of the Harvey Hill Copper Company in the Province of Canada. In 1875, he moved to the United States to take charge of the copper works at Phoenixville, Pennsylvania.

== Douglas' father's influence ==
Douglas' Scottish-born father, James Douglas, was a member of the Royal College of Surgeons. He had earned the reputation of being the fastest surgeon in town, capable of performing an amputation in less than one minute. The elder Douglas transmitted his thirst for adventure to his son, taking him on numerous expeditions to Egypt and the Ottoman Empire in the mid-19th century. He brought back several mummies from these journeys, selling them to museums in North America. One of these, sold in Niagara Falls, was recently (when?) discovered to be the corpse of Ramses I.

== Initial career – ministry ==
James Douglas initially chose a different career from his father, studying to become a minister in the Presbyterian Church. He studied at Queen's College, Kingston, from 1856-1858, and later at the University of Edinburgh. By the end of his studies, however, Douglas had second thoughts: "When therefore I was licensed to teach, my faith in Christ was stronger but my faith in denominational Christianity was so weak that I could not sign the Confession of Faith and therefore was never ordained." He was granted a licence to preach, but never became an ordained minister. This secularism remained with Douglas all his life. He was primarily responsible for making Queen's into a non-denominational University when he served as Chancellor in 1912.

== Second career – medicine ==
In the 1860s, Douglas helped his father at the Beauport Asylum while studying towards a career in medicine. He worked as a librarian at the Literary and Historical Society of Quebec, and later became the youngest president in the history of the Society. There, he presented numerous lectures to the Society's members, the first on Egyptian hieroglyphics and mummies, and later papers on mining and geological issues.

== Third career – mining ==
This interest in mining and geology eventually supplanted his interest in medicine and Douglas embarked on a third career.Douglas played a key role in the development of large-scale copper mining in the American Southwest, particularly at Bisbee, Arizona, where his metallurgical innovations significantly improved ore processing efficiency and helped establish the region as a major copper-producing center. In the 1860s, his father's financial fiasco investing in the Harvey Hill copper mine, Province of Canada, brought to Douglas the opportunity to save the family fortune by finding a way to make the mine profitable (it never was). In 1869, Douglas' scientific experiments with the assistance of Dr. Thomas Sterry Hunt at Université Laval led him to a discovery that was to change his life. The Harvey Hill operation failed though their process worked. Together, they elaborated a patent for the "Hunt and Douglas" process of extracting copper from its ore. Although Douglas had no formal education in chemistry, he was considered competent enough to fill the Chair of Chemistry at his hometown's Morrin College affiliated with McGill University, from 1871 to 1874. His evening lectures were among the most popular in the history of the College.

== Mining-related inventions ==
With Thomas Sterry Hunt, Douglas was involved with many experiments in the hydrometallurgy of coppers and devised what is known as the "Hunt-Douglas" process (first patented 1869) for extracting copper from its ores. Douglas was also the inventor of several other improvements in the mining industry, consisting of the invention for calcining ores (1884), a furnace for calcining ores (1898), a process for extracting copper from cupriferous nickel ore (1892), a process for separating and recovering copper (1896), and an improved smelting furnace in 1897. During the early 1870s, he traveled to copper mines in Chile and Ore Knob, North Carolina to introduce the Hunt & Douglas process. In 1874, he introduced an improvement on the Hunt-Douglas process at J. Oscar Stewart's quartz mill in Georgetown, Colorado, to also recover silver. In 1890, he hired the young Dr. L. D. Ricketts, one of the brightest metallurgists of his generation, to introduce the Hunt Douglas process in Arizona. Then, in little over a decade, Douglas employed research chemists at each of the major Phelps Dodge operations in Arizona: Morenci, Globe, Bisbee, and, later, Tyrone, New Mexico, directed by a chief chemist in the Phelps Dodge research labs outside New York City. Dr. Douglas' emphasis on research chemistry supported by Phelps Dodge was one of the first such efforts in the mining industry. He is praised as a proponent of the open exchange of ideas, scientific and technological innovations, especially during the secretive years of 19th century copper metallurgy.

== Phelps Dodge and the Copper Queen Mine ==
Douglas' patents attracted attention in the United States, and in 1875 he quit his teaching post to work as superintendent for the Chemical Copper Company, Phoenixville, near Philadelphia, Pennsylvania, then a major center of the chemical industry. In 1883, after the Phoenixville works burned down, he made his last permanent move, to the New York City area to be closer to the financial hub. During this period, he also performed mining consultant work, which took him to mining camps across the far West. In 1880, Douglas was recruited by Professor Benjamin Silliman Jr. of Yale (and stockholder in the Chemical Copper Company), to report on the Detroit Copper Company of Morenci, Arizona Territory, as a favor for Phelps Dodge and Company. While working for Chemical Copper, Douglas had opportunity to view fabulously rich specimens from a mine in Bisbee, Arizona Territory, known as the Copper Queen mine, the latter's bonanza orebody having been opened by a San Francisco firm two years previously. Only a day's travel from Morenci, Douglas visited the other claim, then looked around the tight confines of Mule Canyon. Adjacent the Copper Queen was the Atlanta claim, which Douglas also reported on for the New York import/export trading concern. Douglas urged Phelps Dodge to option the Detroit Copper Co. ($75,000) and to purchase the Atlanta claim outright. Asked if he would manage operations in the West as a representative of Phelps Dodge, he agreed. Douglas was given the choice of a flat fee or a ten per cent interest in the property for his services, of which he chose the latter, a decision that subsequently made him a fortune.

In 1885, Douglas helped negotiate the purchase of the Copper Queen for Phelps Dodge after the Atlanta and Copper Queen both hit the Atlanta ore body, resulting in the formation of the Copper Queen Consolidated Mining Company, with Douglas as president and general manager. Under Douglas, the Copper Queen Mine in Bisbee, Arizona Territory, became one of the top copper producing mines in the world. Its former headquarters office (built 1896) is now the Bisbee Mining & Historical Museum.

His deep interest in transportation and mining were united in an essay he wrote in 1885 on "Historical and Geographical Features of the Rocky Mountain Railroads" which detailed the geological features of the land near the Union Pacific, Central Pacific, Denver and Rio Grand, Southern Pacific, Atlantic and Pacific, Northern Pacific, and the Canadian Pacific railroads.

== Douglas, Arizona and the Phelps Dodge Corporation ==
In the late 1880s early 90s, with the success of the Copper Queen and backing of Phelps Dodge partners, Dr Douglas acquired for them additional property and built up other spectacular copper mines, including the Detroit Copper Company at Morenci Arizona, the Moctezuma Copper Company at Nacozari, Sonora Mexico, and the United Globe–Old Dominion mines at Globe Arizona. In 1905, the partnership purchased the vast coal lands of Dawson, New Mexico and organized the Stag Canyon Fuel Co. He was made president of each of the operating companies by the Phelps Dodge partners. Importantly, he recruited talented young engineers, including his sons James and Walter, Dr. L. D. Ricketts, and Charles E. Mills, to manage the expanding business. When the Copper Queen company built a new smelter in the flats east of Bisbee, the founders of the adjacent Mexican border town named Douglas, Arizona for him.

On a quest for ever cheaper freight rates for materials, along with outgoing copper and upset with those offered by the two present railroads (AT&SF and Southern Pacific), Douglas led in the construction of mine railroad branches from 1888. Originally the Arizona and South Eastern Railroad, the line went first to Fairbank and a connection with the AT&SF. Unsatisfied with their service, the road pushed onward to a link with the SP at Benson. In 1900 Phelps Dodge commissioned a smelter at the new town of Douglas, and the rails were extended to that property, as well from their south of the border properties at Nacozari in 1902. Again unsatisfied with freight rates offered by the big railroads, a line extension was pushed to El Paso, TX by 1904. In 1901 the line incorporated as the El Paso and Southwestern Railroad and added the El Paso and Northeastern Railroad in 1905, establishing a 750-mile rail link between the Rock Island at Tucumcari New Mexico and Southern Pacific Lines at Tucson Arizona, via El Paso and Douglas.

With the passing of the senior members of the Phelps Dodge partnership, the firm was dissolved and replaced in 1908 with Phelps Dodge & Company, a holding company of all the subsidiary properties. Douglas became the first president. This was reorganized in 1917 as the Phelps Dodge Corporation, with each of the subsidiary companies becoming operating divisions. Douglas became CEO with son Walter as president, and helped transform the corporation into a Fortune 500 company. He began reducing his business commitments and delved into philanthropy more until his death in 1918, at his home in Spuyten Durvil, New York.

James Douglas was always known as Dr. Douglas or Prof. Douglas. His son, James S. Douglas Jr., or "Rawhide Jimmy" (1867–1949), managed the Phelps Dodge works at Nacazori before heading off on his own and building a major fortune with the United Verde Extension mine in Jerome, Arizona. In the town of Nacozari, his children erected a memorial fountain in his honor in 1921; a replica of Max Blondat's sculpture "Jeunesses." His Jerome mansion is open to the public as the Jerome State Historic Park. Walter Douglas followed in his father's footsteps as manager of the Copper Queen, then president and finally CEO of Phelps Dodge. James S. Douglas Jr.'s son (Dr. Douglas' grandson) Lewis Douglas was elected U.S. Congressman representing Arizona, served within President Roosevelt's administration, and later was appointed Ambassador to Great Britain.

== Publications and philanthropy ==
Throughout this time, Douglas maintained an interest in Canadian history and heritage. He wrote several books on the subject in his lifetime, namely Canadian Independence, Old France in the New World, and New England and New France—Contrasts and Parallels in Colonial History. In addition to bailing Queen's University out of a financial crisis with approximately a million dollars from his own pocket, Douglas also established the first chair in Canadian and Colonial History there in 1910. He also financed many libraries, such as the library of the Literary and Historical Society of Quebec, where interest from his donations is still used to purchase books. He had built and supported libraries in each of the Phelps Dodge major mining camps and smelter towns.

== Medical philanthropy ==
Douglas was dedicated to investigating the effects of radiation on cancer following the treatment of his daughter in England. In 1911, to devise a method to more cheaply produce radium, he directed the Phelps Dodge research lab under chemist George Van Arsdale to experiment with various processes to extract radium from carnotite. Douglas and Dr. Howard Kelly, a Baltimore, Maryland gynecologist and philanthropist, joined forces to supply radium in the US. In partnership with the U.S. Bureau of Mines, they formed the National Radium Institute.

Douglas also donated to several medical causes. In 1912 Douglas gave $100,000 to General Memorial Hospital (which would become known as Memorial Sloan Kettering Cancer Center) for the endowment of ten beds for clinical research work, and the equipment for an X-ray plant and clinical laboratory.

In 1915 Dr. Douglas, working with Dr. James Ewing, helped to establish a radium department and lay the foundation in the United States for radiation therapy.

Also of note is the Douglas Hospital in Montreal, Quebec. This institution pursued the cause which had been taken up by his father, a pioneer in the treatment of mental health in Quebec. Douglas' donations helped keep the hospital alive in the institution's early years. Originally called the "Protestant Hospital for the Insane", the institution took on the name of Douglas Hospital in 1965 as a tribute to James Douglas Jr. and his father.

In 1913 Douglas donated nearly a million dollars of radium to Johns Hopkins University, helping medical research.

== Professional accolades ==
He was a member of a number of technical or scientific societies and served twice as president of the American Institute of Mining Engineers, 1899–1900. Since 1922, the American Institute of Mining, Metallurgical, and Petroleum Engineers annually awards the James Douglas Gold Medal in his memory. His writings on the copper industry are voluminous, He was an advocate of the free exchange of scientific information.

The Douglas Library at Queen's University, Kingston, Ontario, is named in his honor, as is Douglas Hall at McGill University. Dr. Douglas also endowed a lectureship at the University of Arizona, Tucson, and in 1940 Phelps Dodge Corporation funded the construction of the James Douglas Memorial Building for Mines and Metallurgy at the University of Arizona.

In 2018, the City Council of Nacozari de García, Mexico, honored Dr. Douglas by enacting an ordinance designating the Municipal Auditorium to be known as "James Douglas". This resolution was adopted as a posthumous tribute in memory of Dr. James Douglas on the 100th anniversary of his death.

== Professional memberships ==
- American Institute of Mining Engineers
- Association for the Protection of the Adirondacks
- North American Institute of Mining and Mechanical Engineers
- Institute of Mining & Metallurgy
- Iron and Steel Institute
- The American Academy of Political and Social Science
- The Blue Pencil Club of the State of New York

== Works by James Douglas ==
- Memoir of T. Sterry Hunt, F.R.S. (1898)
- Untechnical Addresses on Technical Subjects (1905)
- Old France in the New World (1905)
- The Influence of the Railroads of the United States and Canada on the Mineral Industry (1909)
- Journals and Reminiscences of James Douglas, M.D. (1910)

Academic offices
| Preceded by Sandford Fleming | Chancellor of Queen's University; 1915–1918 | Succeeded by Edward Wentworth Beatty |
