= Jerome State Historic Park =

Protected area in Yavapai County, Arizona

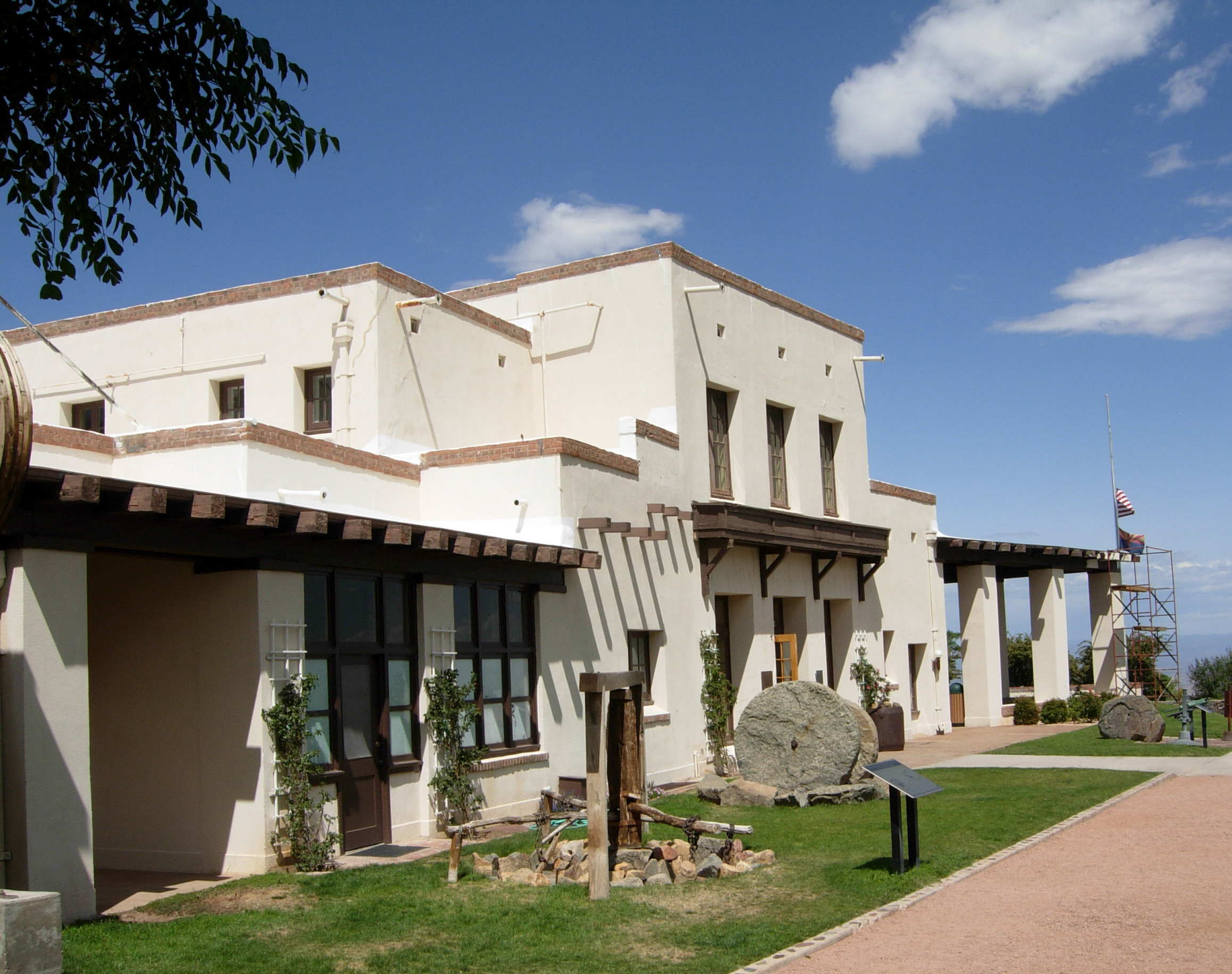
- The Douglas Mansion

- Location within Arizona
- Location: Verde Valley region Black Hills – (north section) (Mingus Mountain), Arizona, United States
- Coordinates: 34°45′14″N 112°06′40″W
- Area: 2.43 acres (0.98 ha)
- Elevation: 5,000 ft (1,500 m)
- Established: 1957
- Administrator: Arizona State Parks & Trails
- Visitors: 28,604 (in 2024)
- Website: Official website

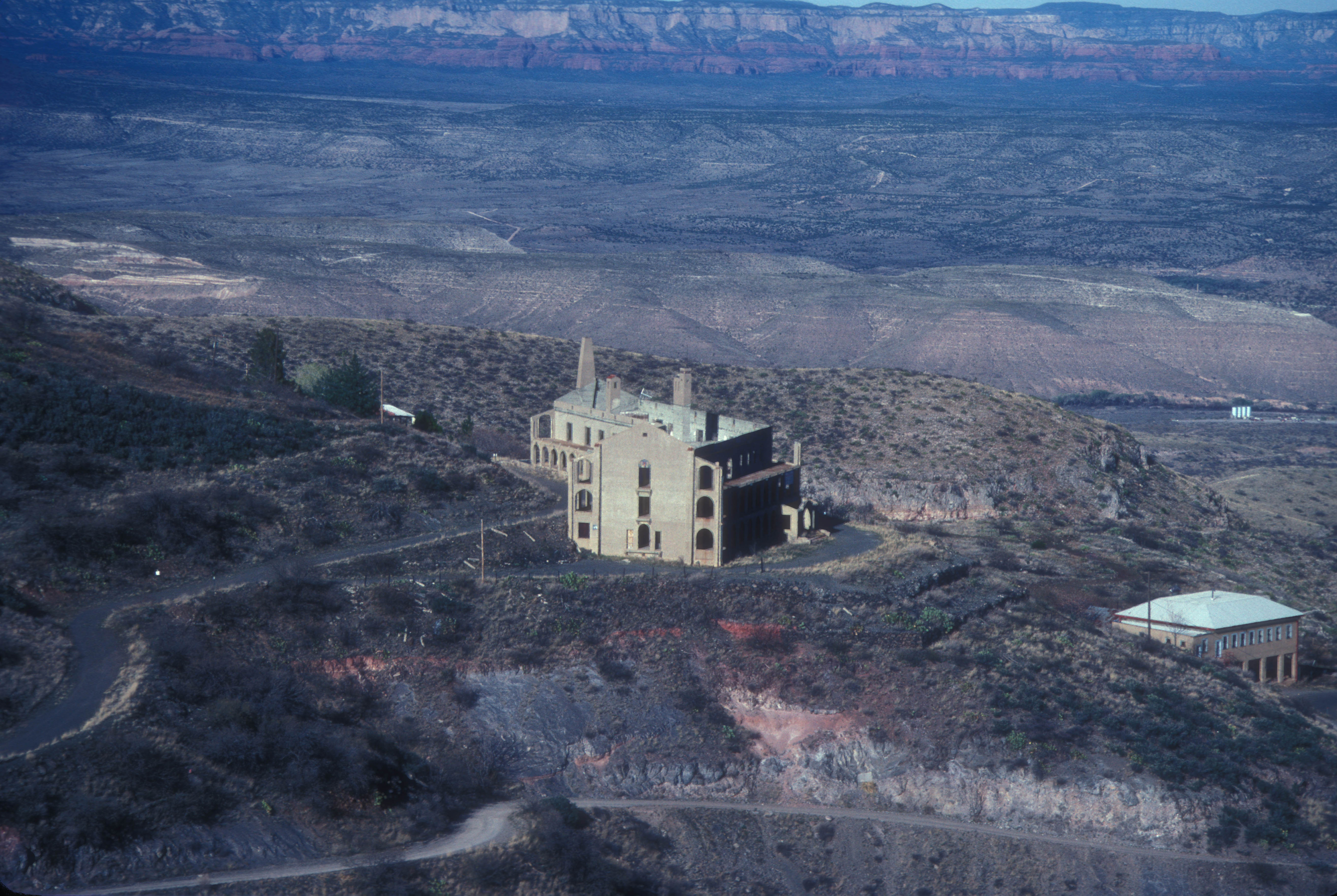
Little Daisy Hotel

Jerome State Historic Park is a state park of Arizona, United States, featuring the Douglas Mansion, built in 1916 by a family of influential mining entrepreneurs in Jerome, Arizona, a mining region in the northeast of the Black Hills, east Yavapai County. A museum is located in the old Douglas Mansion.

Jerome State Historic Park reopened on October 14, 2010, after being closed since February 27, 2009, because of budget cuts and the need to repair the historic mansion. Renovation and stabilization were funded by a state heritage grant and donations from the Douglas family. The park is open on a seven-day schedule thanks to additional funding raised by Yavapai County, the city of Jerome, and the Jerome Historical Society.

== Douglas Mansion ==
The Douglas Mansion has been a landmark in Jerome since 1916, when Jimmy Douglas built it on the hill just above his Little Daisy Mine.

Douglas designed the house as a hotel for mining officials and investors as well as for his own family. It featured a wine cellar, billiard room, marble shower, steam heat, and, much ahead of its time, a central vacuum system. Douglas was most proud of the fact that the house was constructed of adobe bricks that were made on the site. The house is the largest adobe structure in Arizona.

He also built the Little Daisy Hotel near the mine as a dormitory for the miners. The concrete structure still stands. It has been remodeled into a private residence.

== History ==
In 1962 the sons of Jimmy Douglas donated the Douglas Mansion to the State of Arizona. The Jerome State Historic Park opened in 1965. It has continued to develop its exhibits and expand its collection of historic artifacts and archival material. The park's mission is to interpret the history of the Douglas family and the history of Jerome in the mining era.

== Features ==
The old mansion is now a museum devoted to history of the Jerome area and the Douglas family. The museum features exhibits of photographs, mining artifacts, and minerals in addition to a video presentation and a 3-D model of the town with its underground mines. One room, the Douglas library, is restored as a period room. There are more mining artifacts outside along with a picnic area offering a panoramic view of the Verde Valley & River, and the red rocks of Sedona–Oak Creek Canyon region.

== See also ==
- List of historic properties in Jerome, Arizona
