= Black Hills (Yavapai County) =

Landform in Yavapai County, Arizona

Black Hills (Yavapai County) Mingus Mountain
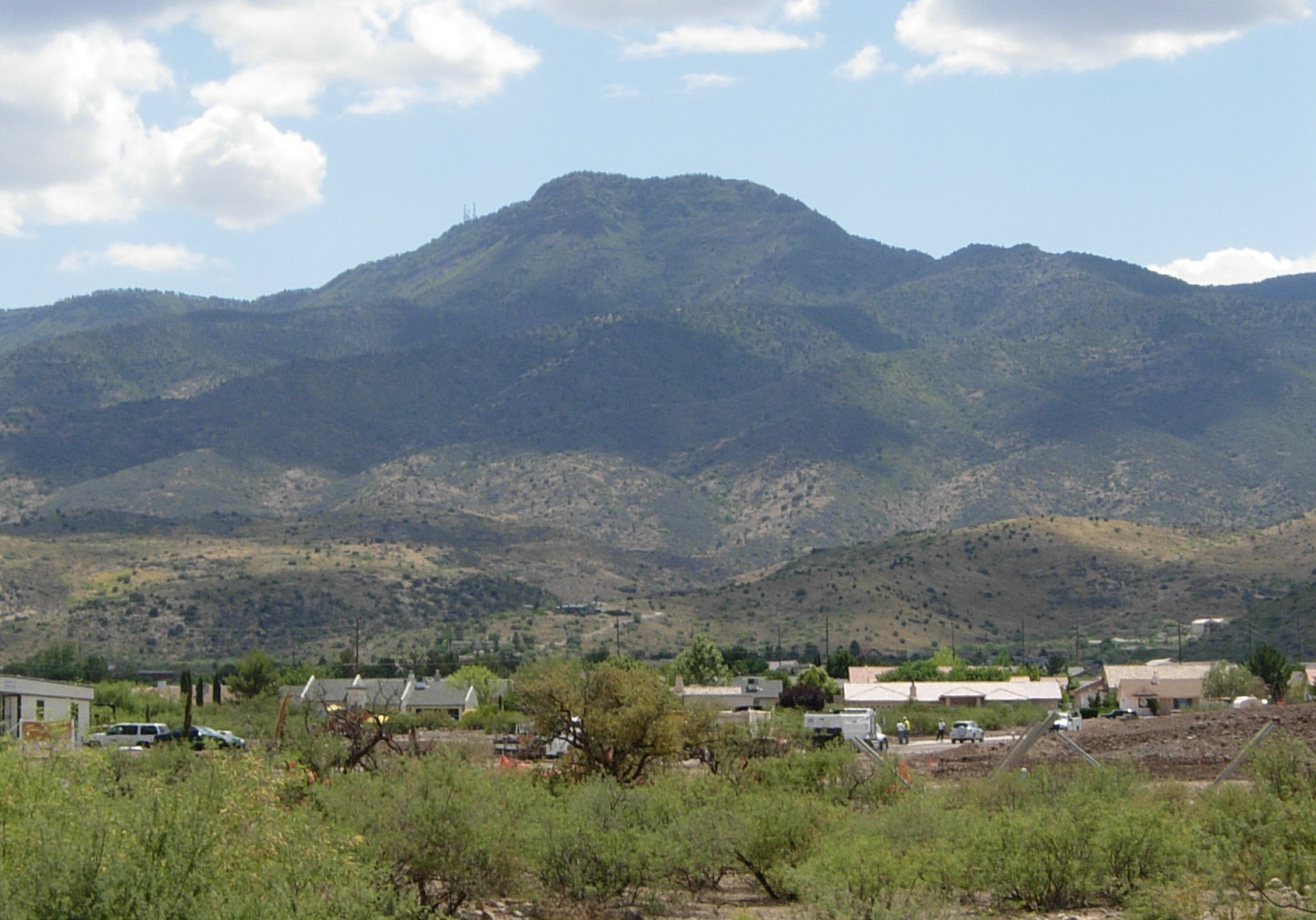
- View looking up the escarpment, (from western Verde Valley)

Highest point
- Peak: Woodchute Mountain
- Elevation: 7,844 ft (2,391 m)
- Coordinates: 34°44′59″N 112°10′31″W

Dimensions
- Length: 45 mi (72 km) NW-SE
- Width: 15 mi (24 km)

Geography
- Location within Arizona
- Country: United States
- State: Arizona
- Region: Arizona transition zone (north-central to Sonoran Desert)
- County: Yavapai
- River: Verde River
- Settlements: Clarkdale, Cottonwood, Camp Verde, Cherry (ghost town), Jerome and Cornville
- Range coordinates: 34°44′59″N 112°10′31″W
- Borders on: Verde River, Verde Valley, Lonesome Valley, Mazatzal Mountains and Bradshaw Mountains

The Black Hills of Yavapai County (in Yavapai: Waulkayauayau – "pine tableland") are a large mountain range of central Arizona in southeast Yavapai County. It is bordered by the Verde Valley to the east. The northwest section of the range is bisected from the southeast section by Interstate 17, which is the main route connecting Phoenix to Sedona, Oak Creek Canyon, and Flagstaff. This bisection point is the approximate center of the mostly northwest by southeast trending range. The northwest section contains a steep escarpment on the northeast with the Verde Valley, the escarpment being the location of the fault-block that created the historic mining district at Jerome. The United Verde Mine was one of the largest copper mines in the United States, producing large quantities of copper, gold, silver and zinc.

The range is also the first major fault-blocked range west of the Mogollon Rim on the southwest margin of the Colorado Plateau in Arizona. They are bordered to the east by the Verde Fault zone, and to the west by the Coyote Fault zone. The range is at the northwest-center of the Arizona transition zone which extends diagonally across central Arizona.

== Description ==
The highest point of the Black Hills (Arizona) is Woodchute Mountain at 7,844 feet (2,391 m). Mingus Mountain lies 4.0 miles (6.4 km) south of Woodchute Mountain with historic Cherry 8.7 miles (14.0 km) further to the southeast.

Three wilderness areas are located in the range, the Woodchute Wilderness in the northwest, and the Cedar Bench, and Pine Mountain Wildernesses in the southeast.
