= Mingus Lookout Complex =

- U.S. National Register of Historic Places
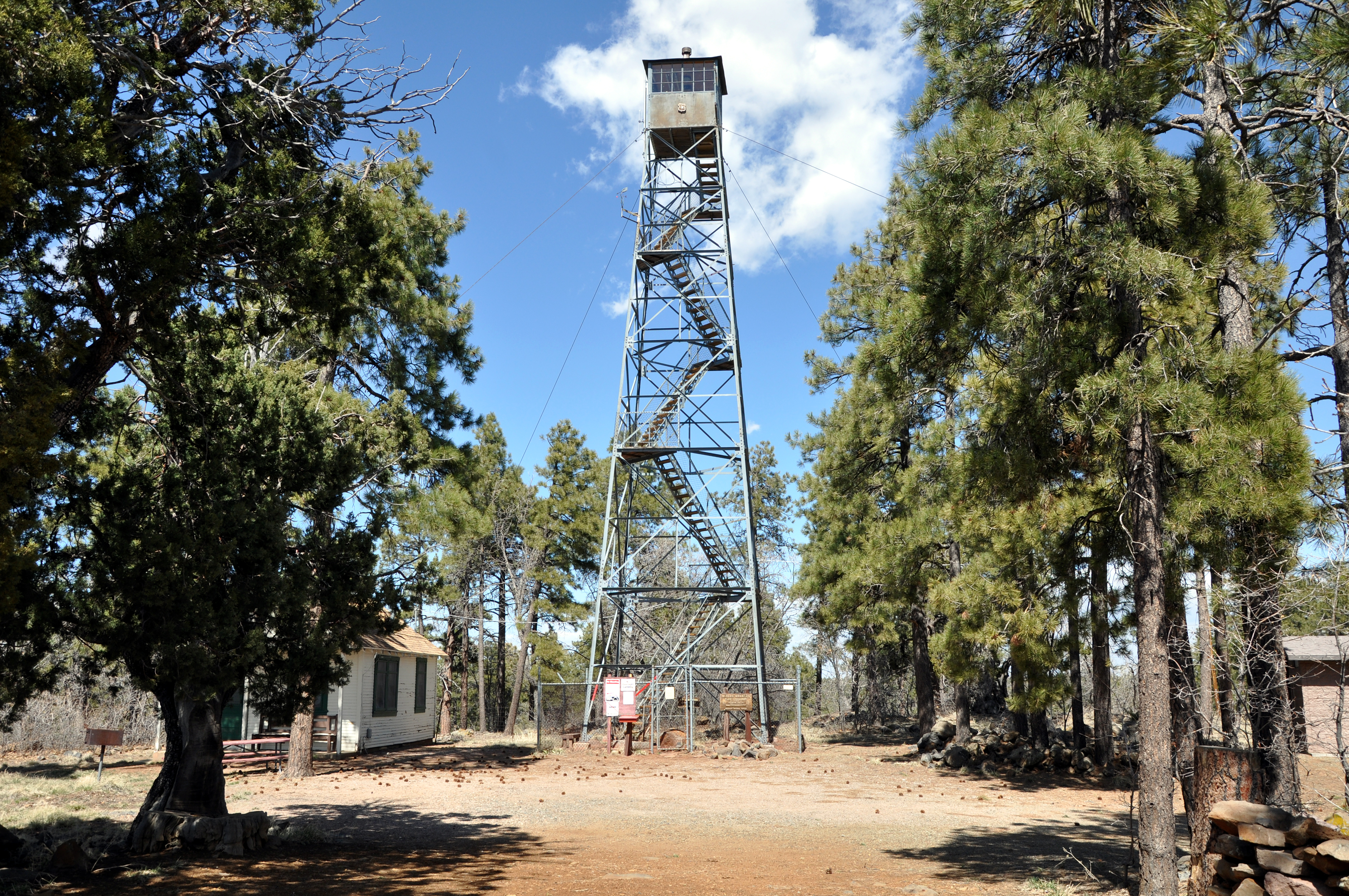
- Fire lookout tower and buildings

- Location within Arizona Location within the United States
- Nearest city: Jerome, Arizona
- Coordinates: 34°41′39″N 112°7′38″W
- Built: 1935
- MPS: National Forest Fire Lookouts in the Southwestern Region TR
- NRHP reference No.: 87002490
- Added to NRHP: January 28, 1988

Mingus Lookout Complex is a fire tower lookout complex atop Mingus Mountain in Prescott National Forest, in Arizona. It was listed on the National Register of Historic Places in 1988.

The fire tower is a 60 feet (18 m) Pacific Coast Steel tower built in 1935. It replaced a 41 feet (12 m) wooden tower. The tower has a 7 feet (2.1 m) by 7 feet (2.1 m) wooden cab with an overhanging front porch and a gable roof.

It was listed on the National Register along with 41 other fire lookout towers in a batch in 1988.
