= Sliding Jail =

Historic building in Arizona

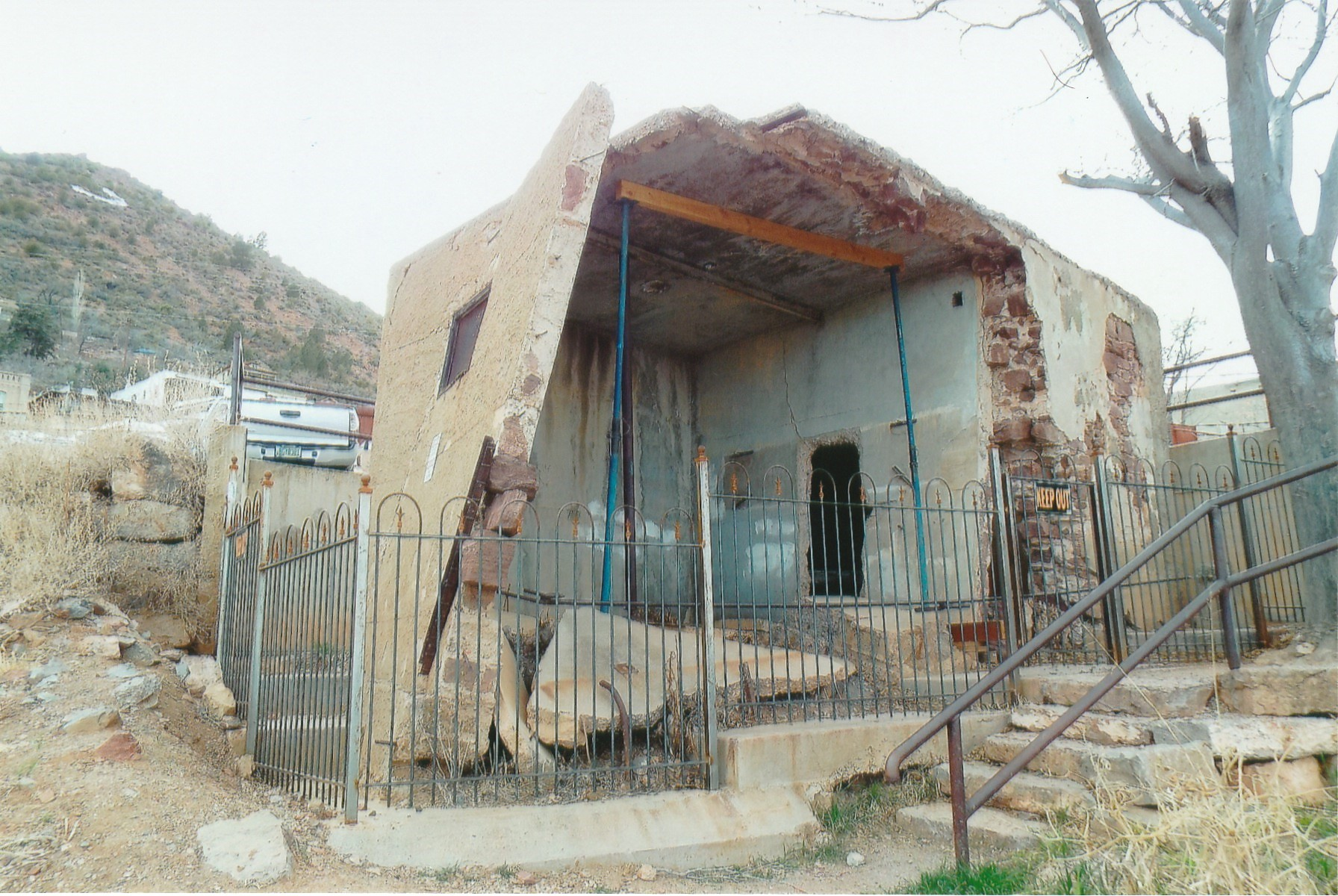
- The jail in 2018

- Location within Arizona Sliding Jail (the United States)

General information
- Location: Jerome, Arizona
- Coordinates: 34.7507°N 112.1146°W
- Year built: 1905
- Owner: Jerome Historical Society

Technical details
- Material: Concrete

The Sliding Jail is a historic jail building in Jerome, Arizona. It is known for its gradual ~225 ft (69 m) slide down the mountainside it sat on. The jail is one of the main attractions of the town.

== History ==
The building, the city's third jail, was initially a part of a larger structure made from wood and tin. The jail, built in 1905, began sliding in 1938 when the shape of the mountain it sat on changed after it was blasted with dynamite. It slid about 225 ft (69 m), tearing away from its original building. When it was finished sliding, the jail ended up directly on Hull Ave. Instead of removing the jail, citizens altered the road to go around the building. It was eventually moved to its current spot by the Arizona Department of Transportation. In 2017, the Jerome Historical Society gained control of the jail and, to make sure the building did not collapse, stabilized the remaining walls. An iron fence also surrounds the property. They plan to eventually restore the jail in its entirety.
