= National Radium Institute =

- Abbreviation: NRI
- Formation: September 1913
- Dissolved: January 1920
- Purpose: Radium development
- Headquarters: Denver, Colorado

The National Radium Institute (NRI) was an organization incorporated in 1913 to extract radium from US domestic sources for use in cancer treatment and possible industrial use and in the process to develop more efficient methods of radium extraction. It was headquartered in Denver, Colorado. The institute was a joint project initiated by Dr. Howard Kelly a physician at Johns Hopkins University, and James S. Douglas, a mining executive and philanthropist, in cooperation with the US Bureau of Mines.

The Institute's main radium plant in Denver was closed down in April 1917 and the NRI was officially dissolved as a corporation in Delaware in late 1919 and in Colorado on 20 January 1920. NRI's plants and sites changed hands and uses several times in the following decades. In 1988, the institute's last two surviving buildings were demolished "due to extensive radiological contamination".
