= Mingus Mountain =

Mountain in Arizona, United States

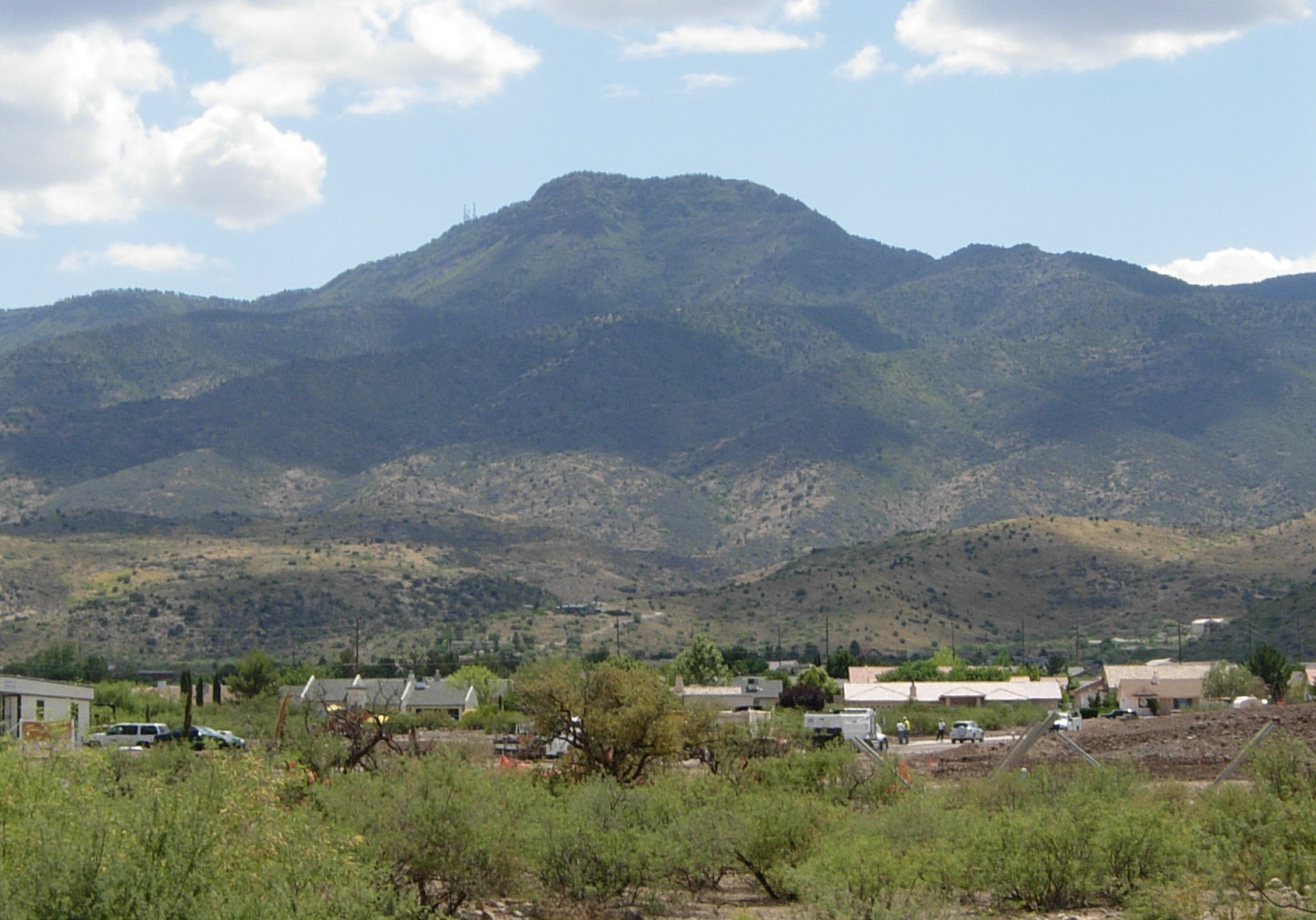
- Mingus Mountain viewed from Cottonwood, Arizona

Highest point
- Elevation: 7,818 ft (2,383 m) NAVD 88
- Prominence: 793 ft (242 m)
- Coordinates: 34°41′38″N 112°07′40″W

Naming
- Native name: Hwa:lkyañaña (Yavapai)

Geography
- Location within Arizona
- Location: Yavapai County, Arizona, U.S.
- Parent range: Black Hills
- Topo map: USGS Cottonwood

Climbing
- Easiest route: Road

Mingus Mountain (Yavapai: Hwa:lkyañaña) is a mountain located in the U.S. state of Arizona in the Black Hills mountain range. It is located within the Prescott National Forest traversed by State Route 89A approximately midway between Cottonwood and Prescott. The summit can be reached via Forest Service roads that branch off from State Route 89A. From the mountain, there are views of the Verde Valley, Sycamore Canyon Wilderness and the towns of Cottonwood, Jerome, and Clarkdale. The Woodchute Wilderness, north of the highest point of 89A, also offers views and hiking trails. There are several National Forest campgrounds in the area and it is the transmitter location for Prescott full-service television station KAZT-TV and several low-power television stations serving Cottonwood, Clarkdale, Camp Verde and Prescott Valley. Mingus Mountain is also the premier flying site of the Arizona Hang Gliding and Paragliding Association.

According to the book, Roadside History of Arizona, by Marshall Trimble, "Mingus Mountain was named for Joseph and Jacob Mingus, two brothers who settled in the area in the 1880s and later operated a sawmill near the base of the mountain". Another source attributes the name to William Mingus (d. 1911, Prescott, Arizona), a pioneer prospector who lived and worked on Mingus Mountain in the 1870s.

The Mingus Lookout Complex is a complex of fire tower and associated buildings at the top of the mountain, and is listed on the National Register of Historic Places.

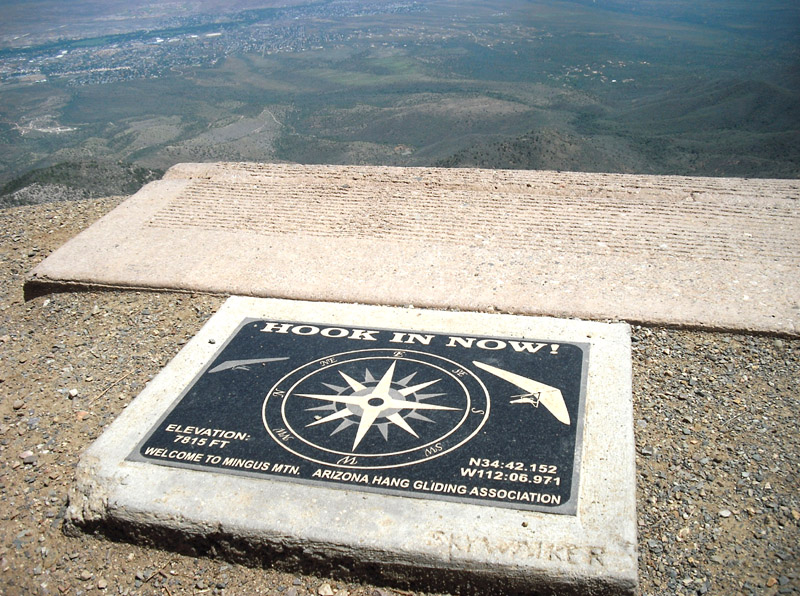
The launching platform for hang gliding on Mingus Mountain

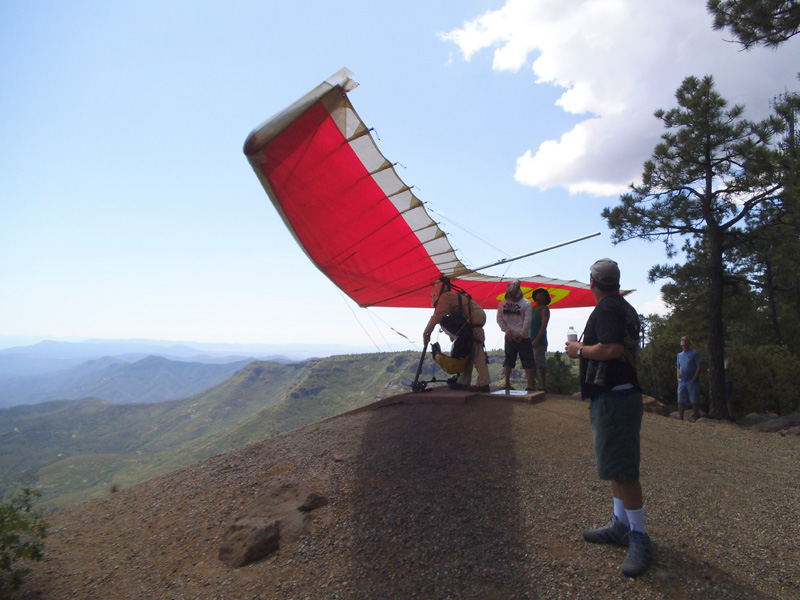
A hang glider preparing for launch at Mingus Mountain
