= James Douglas Jr. =

Canadian-born American businessman (1868–1949)

James Stuart Douglas
- Born: James Stuart Douglas; 19 June 1868; Inverness, Quebec, Canada
- Died: 2 January 1949 (aged 80); Montreal, Quebec, Canada
- Other name: Rawhide Jimmy
- Occupation: Businessman
- Height: 5 ft 8 in (173 cm)
- Political party: Democrat
- Spouse: Josephine Leah Williams (1872–1941)
- Children: Lewis Douglas; James Douglas
- Parent(s): James Walter Douglas; Naomi Eleanor Douglas

James Stuart Douglas (19 June 1868 – 2 January 1949), popularly known as Rawhide Jimmy, was a Canadian-born American businessman and mining executive.

== Early life ==
Douglas was the son of Canadian mining engineer and executive James Walter Douglas (1837–1918) and Naomi Eleanor Douglas (1838–1922). Born at Inverness, Quebec, Jimmy Douglas grew up in Phoenixville, Pennsylvania, where his father managed the Chemical Copper Company. Douglas left home at 17 and moved west to Manitoba, where he homesteaded. Suffering from asthma, he moved to the Arizona Territory, in the United States, in the hope that the drier climate might provide relief.

== Career ==
He moved to Bisbee, Arizona, at his father's request to work as an assayer for the Copper Queen Mine. His father had acquired an interest in the mine from the Phelps Dodge mining company.

In 1892 Douglas moved to Prescott to work for the Commercial Mining Company, an affiliate of the Phelps Dodge. Eight years later he was transferred to Sonora, Mexico, to manage the copper mine and smelter at Pilares and Nacozari; and directed construction of a railroad from Douglas, Arizona to Nacozari. While at Pilares, he acquired his nickname, "Rawhide Jimmy", because of his technique of using rawhide to protect the rollers on mining equipment. Afterward, he moved to Cananea, Sonora, to manage the copper operations there.

== UVX Mining Co. ==
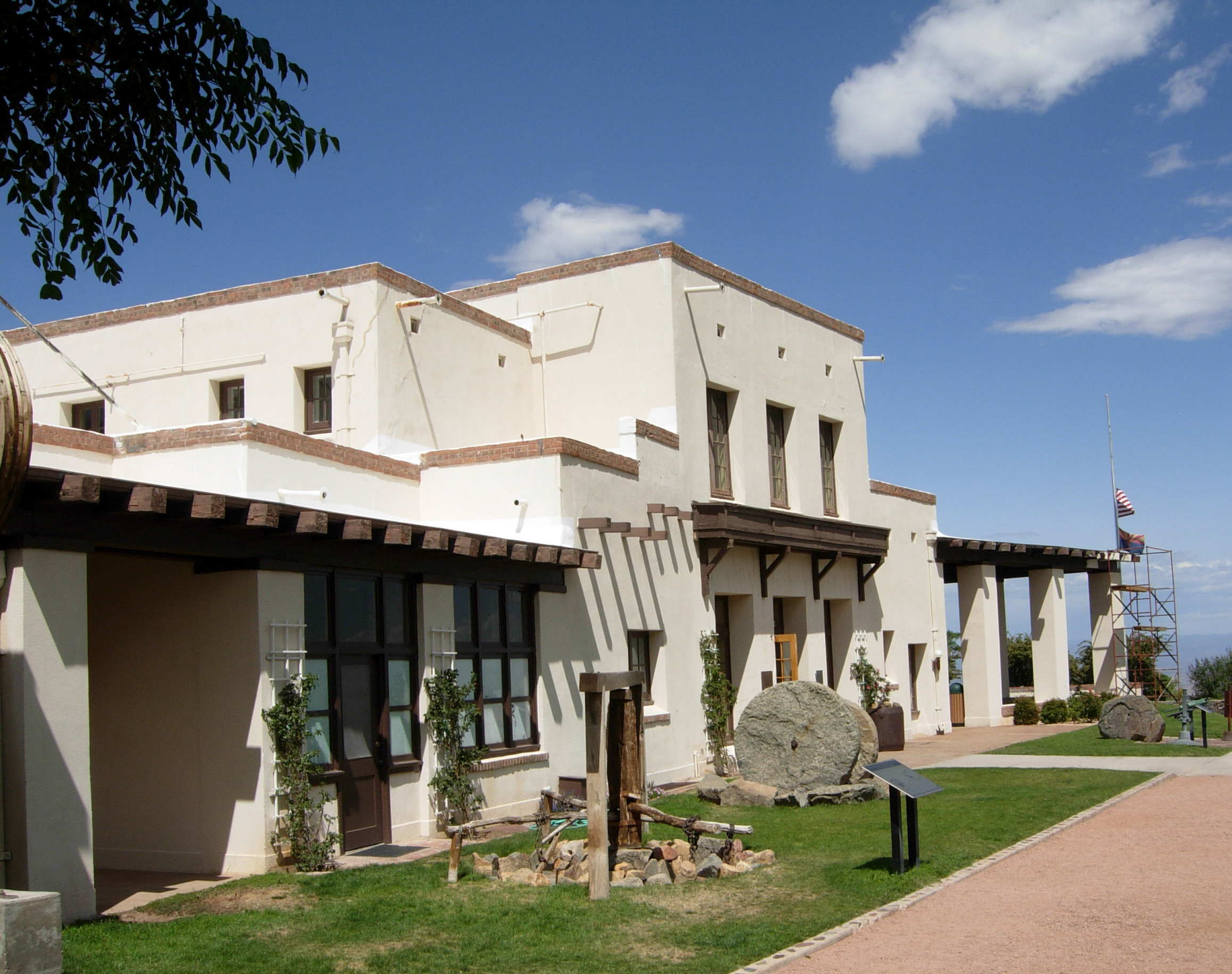
The Douglas Mansion in Jerome

In 1912, Douglas returned to central Arizona, where he took an option on the United Verde Extension (UVX) property, a speculative venture to find the down-faulted extension of the great "United Verde" ore body near Jerome, Arizona. In 1914, with funds near exhaustion, an exploration drift cut bonanza copper ore. The UVX mine started to produce a profit. The mine produced copper, silver, and gold valued at $10 million in 1916 alone, with a profit of $7.4 million. The UVX paid $55 million in dividends during its life (1915–1938), making Douglas a wealthy man.

== Personal life ==
James Douglas was married to Josephine Leah Williams (1872–1941). Their son, Lewis W. Douglas (1894–1974), also entered the mining business, went on to a successful political career as an Arizona Congressman from 1927 to 1933. He served as the Ambassador to the United Kingdom (1947–51). In 1939, Douglas retired to Quebec where he died of heart failure in 1949.

== Jerome State Historic Park ==
The Douglas Mansion is open to the public as the Jerome State Historic Park.
