= United Verde Mine =

Former mine in Yavapai County, Arizona

Coordinates: 34.7500°N 112.1222°W

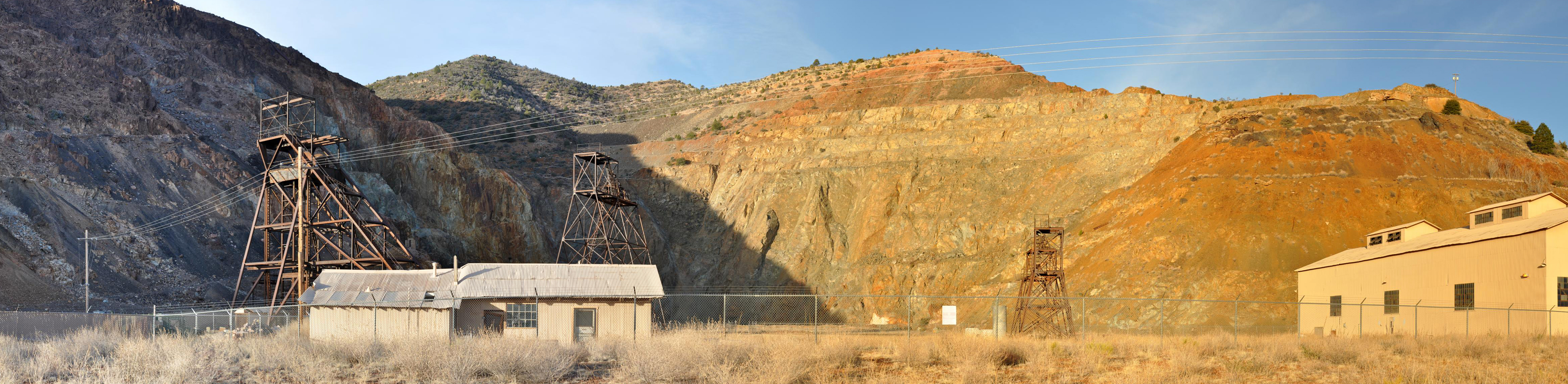
- Site of the United Verde open-pit copper mine near Jerome
- Interactive map of United Verde Mine
- Location: Arizona, United States
- Products: Copper
- Opened: 1880s
- Closed: 1953

The United Verde mine was one of the largest copper mines in the United States. The mine was located in the town of Jerome in central Arizona, in the southwestern United States. It produced over two billion pounds of copper, silver, gold and manganese.

William A. Clark was the major developer of the mine. The Phelps Dodge corporation acquired the mine from the Clark heirs in 1935.
