= Woodchute Wilderness =

Protected area in the Prescott National Forest, Arizona

- IUCN category Ib (wilderness area)
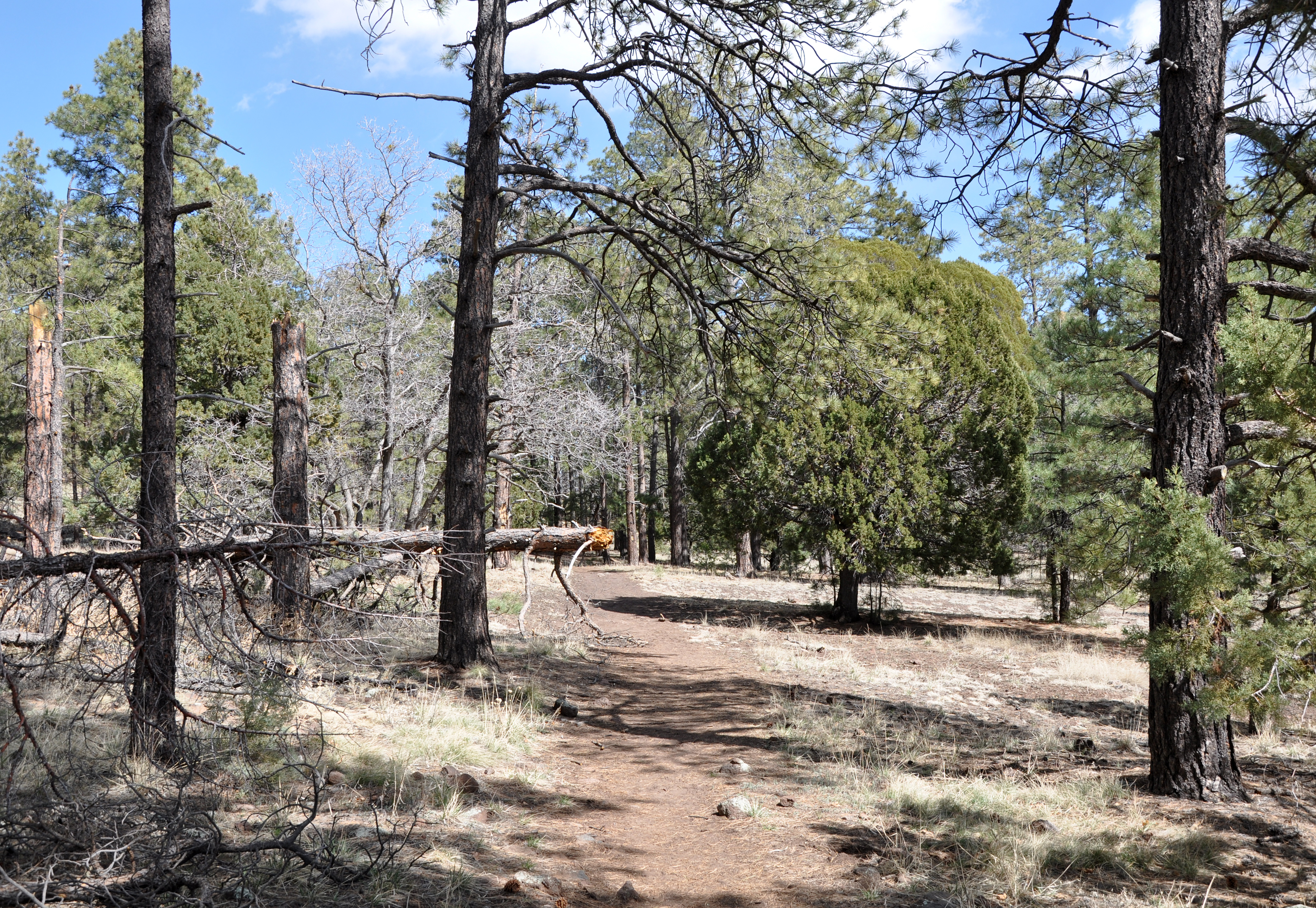
- South end of Trail #102

- Location within the United States
- Location: Yavapai County, Arizona, United States
- Nearest city: Jerome (town)
- Coordinates: 34°45′07″N 112°10′49″W
- Area: 5,923 acres (2,397 ha)
- Established: 1984
- Governing body: U.S. Forest Service

Woodchute Wilderness is a 5,923-acre (2,397 ha) wilderness area in Prescott National Forest in the U.S. state of Arizona. It is about 4 miles (6.4 km) west of the town of Jerome. Elevation within the area, on the flanks of Woodchute Mountain, ranges from 5,500 to 7,800 feet (1,700 to 2,400 m). A chute on the north side of the mountain helped transport wood to historic Jerome.

The wilderness lies within the Munds Draw and Hickey Mountain quadrangles of the national topographic map of the United States Geological Survey. Two trails totaling 8 miles (13 km) cross the protected area. The main trail is Woodchute Trail #102, which connects to the 1.4-mile (2.3 km) Rick Tank Cutoff Trail #104 in the southern part of the wilderness.

Ponderosa pine dominates the upper elevations of the reserve; pinyon pine and Utah juniper are more common at lower and dryer elevations. Wildlife includes American black bear, elk, cougar, mule deer, whitetail deer, bald eagles, and golden eagles. The reserve has views of the San Francisco Peaks to the north and the Verde Valley, including the red rocks of Sedona, to the east.

== See also ==
- List of Arizona Wilderness Areas
- List of U.S. Wilderness Areas
- Wilderness Act
