= Verde Valley =

Valley in central Arizona, US

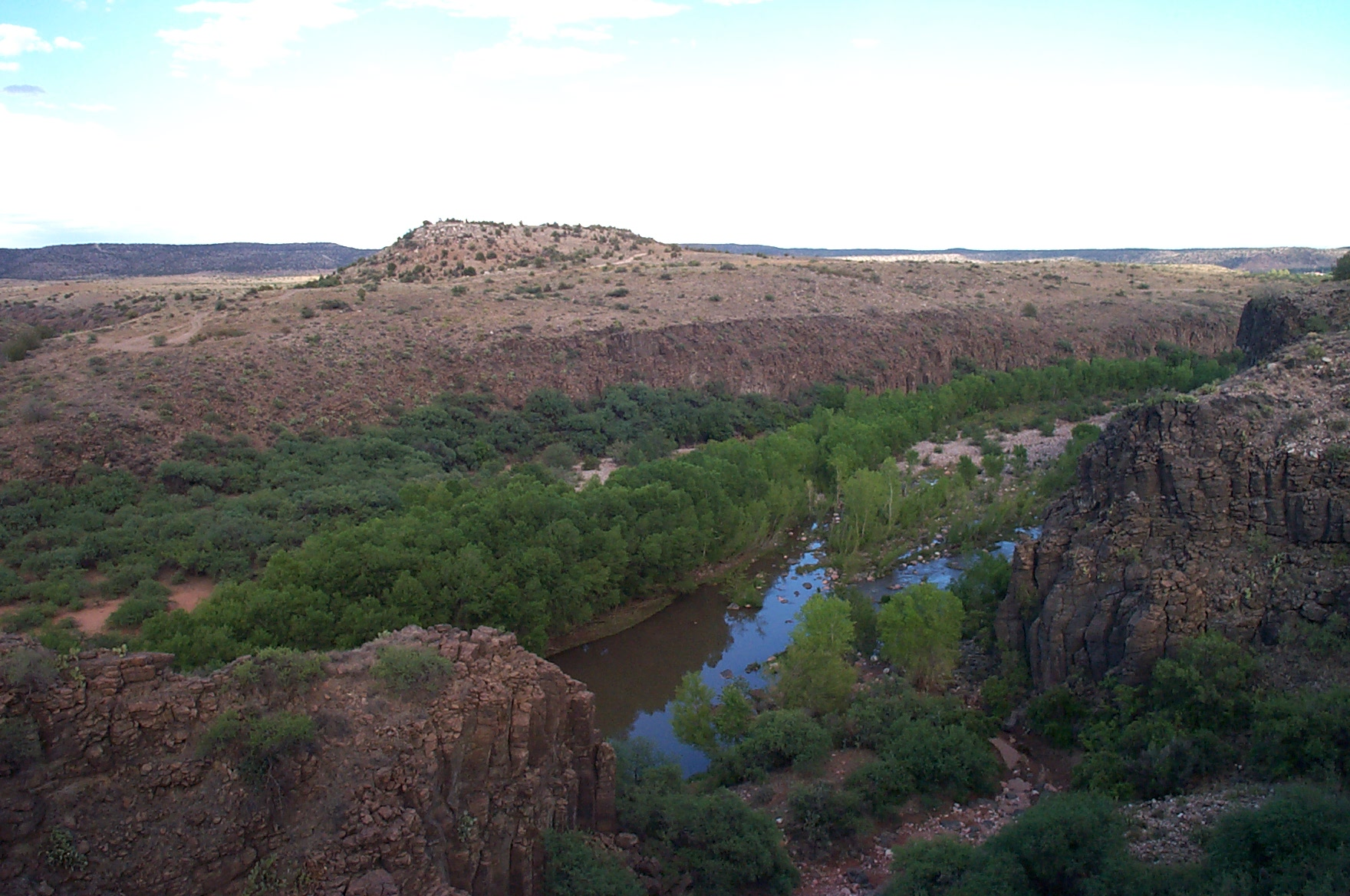
- Verde River, Arizona.

- Location within Arizona
- Length: 40.5 miles (65.2 km)

Geography
- Coordinates: 34°45′11″N 112°01′19″W
- Interactive map of Verde Valley

The Verde Valley (Yavapai: Matkʼamvaha; Spanish: Valle Verde) is a valley in central Arizona in the United States. The Verde River runs through it. The Verde River is one of Arizona's last free-flowing river systems. It provides crucial habitat for fish and wildlife, fresh water for local agricultural production, recreational opportunities for locals and tourists alike, and brings clean drinking water to over 2 million people in the greater Phoenix area. The valley is overlooked by Mingus Mountain and the Mogollon Rim. The valley is one of three regions of viticulture in Arizona and contains the Verde Valley AVA.

== History ==
The first notice of this region appears in the report of Antonio de Espejo, who visited in 1583. Little more was recorded until the commencement of prospecting for gold and silver in the 19th century.

== Towns ==
- Camp Verde
- Clarkdale
- Cornville
- Cottonwood
- Jerome
- Lake Montezuma
- McGuireville
- Rimrock
- Sedona

== See also ==
- Tuzigoot National Monument (pueblo ruin)
- V Bar V Heritage Site (petroglyphs)
- Montezuma Well
- Montezuma Castle National Monument
- Verde Canyon Railroad
- Arizona Central Railroad
