= National Register of Historic Places listings in Yavapai County, Arizona =

Location of Yavapai County in Arizona

This is a list of the National Register of Historic Places listings in Yavapai County, Arizona. It is intended to be a complete list of the properties and districts on the National Register of Historic Places in Yavapai County, Arizona, United States. The locations of National Register properties and districts for which the latitude and longitude coordinates are included below, may be seen in a map.

There are 134 properties and districts listed on the National Register in the county, including 1 that is also a National Historic Landmark. 65 of these properties and districts are located in the city of Prescott, and are listed separately, while the remaining properties and districts (including the National Historic Landmark) are located elsewhere in the county, and are listed here. Three properties listed outside Prescott have been removed from the register.

This National Park Service list is complete through NPS recent listings posted May 1, 2026.

== Current listings ==
=== Exclusive of Prescott ===
	Name on the Register	Image	Date listed	Location	City or town	Description
1	Ash Fork Maintenance Camp No. 1	Ash Fork Maintenance Camp No. 1	March 2, 2000 (#00000103)	Western end of old U.S. Route 66; 35°13′22″N 112°29′28″W	Ash Fork	
2	Beaver Creek Ranger Station	Beaver Creek Ranger Station	June 10, 1993 (#93000512)	Off Interstate 17 northeast of Rimrock in the Coconino National Forest; 34°40′22″N 111°42′41″W	Rimrock	
3	Beaver Creek School		September 20, 2016 (#16000631)	4810 E. Beaver Creek Rd. 34°39′14″N 111°46′02″W	Rimrock	
4	Broadway Bridge	Broadway Bridge	September 30, 1988 (#88001651)	Broadway St. over Bitter Creek; 34°46′27″N 112°03′19″W	Clarkdale	
5	Building at 826 North Main Street	Building at 826 North Main Street	September 19, 1986 (#86002147)	826 N. Main St. 34°44′46″N 112°01′36″W	Cottonwood	
6	Camp Date Creek	Camp Date Creek	March 22, 1996 (#95001361)	North of U.S. Route 89; 34°15′45″N 112°55′24″W	Date Creek	Also known as Camp McPherson
7	Camp Verde Grammar School		November 19, 2018 (#100003126)	435 S Main St. 34°33′48″N 111°51′15″W	Camp Verde	
8	Childs-Irving Hydroelectric Facilities	Childs-Irving Hydroelectric Facilities	August 9, 1991 (#91001023)	From the eastern bank of the Verde River northeast to Stehr Lake and along Fossil Creek in the Tonto National Forest; 34°20′59″N 111°41′57″W	Strawberry	
9	Clark Memorial Clubhouse	Clark Memorial Clubhouse	October 2, 1982 (#82001662)	Off N. 9th St. 34°46′20″N 112°03′20″W	Clarkdale	
10	Clarkdale Historic District	Clarkdale Historic District	January 8, 1998 (#97001586)	Roughly along Main St., roughly bounded by the Verde River including industrial smelter site 34°46′27″N 112°03′31″W	Clarkdale	
11	Clear Creek Church	Clear Creek Church	August 6, 1975 (#75000362)	3.5 mi (5.6 km) southeast of Camp Verde; 34°31′30″N 111°49′41″W	Camp Verde	
12	Clear Creek Pueblo and Caves		February 10, 1975 (#75000363)	Address Restricted	Camp Verde	Sinagua pueblo
13	Clemenceau Public School	Clemenceau Public School	September 19, 1986 (#86002149)	1 N. Willard St. 34°44′24″N 112°01′33″W	Cottonwood	Now Clemenceau Heritage Museum
14	Copper Creek Guard Station	Copper Creek Guard Station	June 10, 1993 (#93000525)	Northeast of Black Canyon City in the Tonto National Forest; 34°12′51″N 111°58′40″W	Black Canyon City	
15	Cottage Hotel	Cottage Hotel	February 12, 1998 (#98000080)	Junction of 1st St. and Shoeny Ave. 35°19′40″N 112°52′35″W	Seligman	
16	Cottonwood Commercial Historic District	Cottonwood Commercial Historic District	May 18, 2000 (#00000497)	Approximately from 712 to 1124 N. Main St.; also North Main St. and East Pima St. 34°44′52″N 112°01′36″W	Cottonwood	Second set of addresses represent a boundary increase approved June 4, 2021.
17	Cross Creek Ranch House		May 29, 2008 (#08000461)	10 Russet Ridge Pl. 34°48′53″N 111°50′14″W	Sedona	
18	Crown King Ranger Station		June 10, 1993 (#93000522)	West of Crown King in the Prescott National Forest; 34°12′22″N 112°20′27″W	Crown King	
19	Edens House	Edens House	September 19, 1986 (#86002150)	1015 N. Cactus St. 34°44′54″N 112°01′38″W	Cottonwood	
20	Fewke's Fort Below Aztec Pass (AR-03-09-06-23)		January 20, 1989 (#88003186)	Address Restricted	Paulden	Prescott Culture archaeological site
21	Fort Verde District	Fort Verde District	October 7, 1971 (#71000120)	Bounded by Hance, Coppinger, and Woods Sts.; also roughly north and east of Hance and Coppinger Sts. to Verde Ditch; 34°33′54″N 111°51′08″W	Camp Verde	Fort Verde State Historic Park and vicinity. Second set of addresses represents a boundary increase.
22	Fossil Creek Bridge	Fossil Creek Bridge	September 30, 1988 (#88001620)	Forest Service Rd. over Fossil Creek; 34°23′39″N 111°37′45″W	Camp Verde	
23	Groom Creek School	Groom Creek School	November 18, 1992 (#92001568)	Senator Highway southeast of Prescott in the Prescott National Forest; 34°28′15″N 112°26′02″W	Groom Creek	
24	Hatalacva Ruin		July 24, 1974 (#74000463)	Address Restricted	Clarkdale	Sinagua ruin
25	Hell Canyon Bridge		September 30, 1988 (#88001682)	34°58′45″N 112°22′54″W	Drake vic.	Road bridge
26	Hyde Mountain Lookout House		January 28, 1988 (#87002491)	Prescott National Forest; 34°50′15″N 112°55′10″W	Camp Wood	
27	Jerome Historic District	Jerome Historic District	November 13, 1966 (#66000196)	Jerome; 34°45′16″N 112°06′45″W	Jerome	
28	Kay-El-Bar Ranch		May 22, 1978 (#78000572)	North of Wickenburg on Rincon Rd. 34°00′34″N 112°44′53″W	Wickenburg	Guest ranch
29	Kirkland Store		October 1, 1998 (#98001215)	Main St. at the corner of Iron Springs Rd. and Kirkland Junction Rd. 34°25′01″N 112°42′32″W	Kirkland	
30	Little Hell Canyon Bridge	Little Hell Canyon Bridge	September 30, 1988 (#88001684)	Abandoned U.S. Route 89 over Little Hell Canyon; 35°04′48″N 112°24′22″W	Drake	
31	Loy Butte Pueblo		February 10, 1975 (#75000367)	Address Restricted	Sedona	Sinagua ruin
32	Lynx Creek Bridge		September 30, 1988 (#88001641)	just east of Lynx Creek Road on the Old Black Canyon Highway; 34°33′08″N 112°22′21″W	Prescott Valley	
33	Lynx Creek District	Lynx Creek District	August 31, 1978 (#78000571)	south of Arizona State Route 69 and east of Stoneridge Drive; 34°34′28″N 112°20′50″W	Prescott Valley	
34	Master Mechanic's House	Master Mechanic's House	September 19, 1986 (#86002152)	333 S. Willard St. 34°44′00″N 112°01′33″W	Cottonwood	UVX smelter complex
35	Mayer Apartments	Mayer Apartments	July 13, 1989 (#89000860)	Central Ave., southwest of Ash St. 34°24′01″N 112°14′22″W	Mayer	
36	Mayer Business Block	Mayer Business Block	July 13, 1989 (#89000859)	Oak St. and Central Ave. 34°23′54″N 112°13′57″W	Mayer	
37	Mayer Red Brick Schoolhouse	Mayer Red Brick Schoolhouse	July 21, 2004 (#04000719)	Main St. 34°24′N 112°14′W	Mayer	
38	Mingus Lookout Complex	Mingus Lookout Complex	January 28, 1988 (#87002490)	Prescott National Forest; 34°41′39″N 112°07′38″W	Jerome	Fire tower and ranger cabin on Mingus Mountain
39	Montezuma Castle National Monument-Back Ranch Historic District-Montezuma Well Unit	Montezuma Castle National Monument-Back Ranch Historic District-Montezuma Well Unit	October 15, 1966 (#66000082)	5525 Beaver Creek Rd., 40 mi (64 km) south of Flagstaff on Interstate 17; 34°38′19″N 111°47′17″W	Camp Verde	Major Sinagua cliff dwelling
40	OK Ranch Historic District		April 19, 2018 (#100002358)	Red Rock Crossing, Sedona Ranger District; 34°49′35″N 111°48′33″W	Coconino National Forest	AKA Crescent Moon Ranch
41	Palace Station District	Palace Station District	April 30, 1976 (#76000382)	23 mi (37 km) south of Prescott in the Prescott National Forest; 34°22′35″N 112°24′32″W	Prescott National Forest	Stagecoach station, built 1874
42	Pecan Lane Rural Historic Landscape	Pecan Lane Rural Historic Landscape	May 11, 2000 (#00000463)	537 to 867 Montezuma Castle Highway; 34°34′47″N 111°51′12″W	Camp Verde	
43	Peeples Valley School		September 26, 2007 (#07000991)	18205 U.S. Route 89; 34°17′03″N 112°43′17″W	Peeples Valley	
44	Perkinsville Bridge	Perkinsville Bridge	March 31, 1989 (#88001671)	Perkinsville-Williams Rd. over the Verde River; 34°53′43″N 112°12′18″W	Perkinsville	South of Ash Fork
45	Perry Mesa Archeological District	Perry Mesa Archeological District	November 20, 1975 (#75000364)	Address Restricted	Black Canyon City	Located on Agua Fria National Monument
46	Poland Tunnel		March 29, 1978 (#78000570)	West of Poland off State Route 69; 34°26′48″N 112°22′23″W	Poland	
47	Rock House		December 19, 1994 (#94001489)	Pine Tree Ln. northwest of Groom Creek; 34°29′21″N 112°26′45″W	Groom Creek	
48	Sacred Mountain	Sacred Mountain	March 4, 1975 (#75000366)	Address Restricted	Rimrock	Sinagua archaeological site
49	Schuerman Homestead House		March 10, 2023 (#100008708)	120 Loy Ln. 34°49′17″N 111°49′20″W	Sedona vicinity	
50	Santa Fe, Prescott & Phoenix Railway, Limestone Canyon District		December 13, 1994 (#94000031)	Address Restricted	Ash Fork and Chino Valley	
51	Seligman Commercial Historic District	Seligman Commercial Historic District	February 1, 2005 (#04000511)	Roughly bounded by 1st and Lamport Sts. and Picacho and Railroad Aves. 35°19′35″N 112°52′27″W	Seligman	
52	Smelter Machine Shop	Smelter Machine Shop	September 19, 1986 (#86002154)	360 S. 6th St. 34°43′59″N 112°01′23″W	Cottonwood	
53	Superintendent's Residence	Superintendent's Residence	October 14, 1986 (#86002159)	315 S. Willard; 34°44′01″N 112°01′33″W	Cottonwood	UVX smelter complex
54	Sycamore Cliff Dwelling		September 28, 1990 (#90001455)	Address Restricted	Sedona	Sinagua ruins
55	Sycamore Ranger Station		June 10, 1993 (#93000523)	Forest Rd. 68F southwest of Camp Verde in the Prescott National Forest; 34°21′07″N 111°58′08″W	Camp Verde	
56	Tuzigoot Developed Area Historic District		January 6, 2025 (#100011217)	25 West Tuzigoot Road, Tuzigoot National Monument (TUZI); 34°46′22″N 112°01′46″W	Clarkdale	
57	Tuzigoot Museum	Tuzigoot Museum	September 9, 2010 (#10000518)	Alternate US 89A and Tuzigoot Rd. 34°46′13″N 112°01′36″W	Clarkdale	Sinagua artifacts at the national monument
58	Tuzigoot National Monument Archeological District	Tuzigoot National Monument Archeological District	October 15, 1966 (#66000194)	Address Restricted	Clarkdale	Large Sinagua pueblo
59	UVX Smelter Operations Complex	UVX Smelter Operations Complex	September 19, 1986 (#86002164)	361 S. Willard; 34°43′57″N 112°01′34″W	Cottonwood	Copper smelter buildings from 1917–36
60	Verde River Bridge		September 30, 1988 (#88001639)	2.7 mi (4.3 km) south of Paulden on Sullivan Lake Rd. 34°51′50″N 112°27′34″W	Paulden	
61	Verde River Sheep Bridge	Verde River Sheep Bridge	November 21, 1978 (#78000569)	North of Carefree on the Verde River; 34°04′39″N 111°42′26″W	Carefree	Demolished 1988
62	Walker Charcoal Kiln	Walker Charcoal Kiln	October 8, 1976 (#76000383)	Southeast of Prescott in the Prescott National Forest; 34°27′30″N 112°22′31″W	Potato Patch	
63	Walnut Creek Bridge		March 31, 1989 (#88001673)	Forest Service Rd. over Walnut Creek; 34°55′44″N 112°48′55″W	Simmons	
64	Walnut Creek Ranger Station		June 10, 1993 (#93000524)	Northwest of Prescott in the Prescott National Forest; 34°55′28″N 112°50′24″W	Simmons	
65	Walnut Grove Bridge		September 30, 1988 (#88001637)	3.5 mi (5.6 km) northwest of Walnut Grove on Wagoner Rd. 34°18′37″N 112°34′05″W	Walnut Grove	
66	Willard House	Willard House	September 19, 1986 (#86002166)	114 N. Main; 34°45′01″N 112°01′43″W	Cottonwood	Queen Anne built in 1890 for Mary Willard, early settler
67	Hank and Myrtle Wingfield Homestead	Hank and Myrtle Wingfield Homestead	July 27, 1999 (#99000857)	806 E. Quarterhorse Ln. 34°32′07″N 111°50′27″W	Camp Verde	Photo is not the NRHP house. The NRHP house is across the street per the photos in the nomination.
68	Robert W. Wingfield House		February 3, 1986 (#86000146)	Montezuma Castle Highway; 34°34′55″N 111°51′09″W	Camp Verde	
69	Woolsey Ranchhouse Ruins	Woolsey Ranchhouse Ruins	November 7, 1977 (#77000240)	North of Humboldt off State Route 69; 34°30′43″N 112°13′52″W	Humboldt	King Woolsey's ranch, circa 1870

== Former listings ==
	Name on the Register	Image	Date listed	Date removed	Location	City or town	Description
1	Mount Union Lookout Cabin		January 28, 1988 (#87002489)	December 6, 1996	Prescott National Forest	Potato Patch	National Forest Fire Lookouts in the Southwestern Region TR. Destroyed by fire.
2	Strahan House		September 19, 1986 (#86002157)	May 23, 2016	725 N. Main St. 34°44′37″N 112°01′16″W	Cottonwood	Demolished in 2007, according to Images of America: Cottonwood, p. 12.
3	Thompson Ranch		September 19, 1986 (#86002162)	May 23, 2016	2874 Alternate U.S. Route 89; 34°43′17″N 111°59′32″W	Cottonwood vicinity	

== See also ==
- List of National Historic Landmarks in Arizona
- National Register of Historic Places listings in Arizona
