= List of historic properties in Camp Verde, Arizona =

- Town
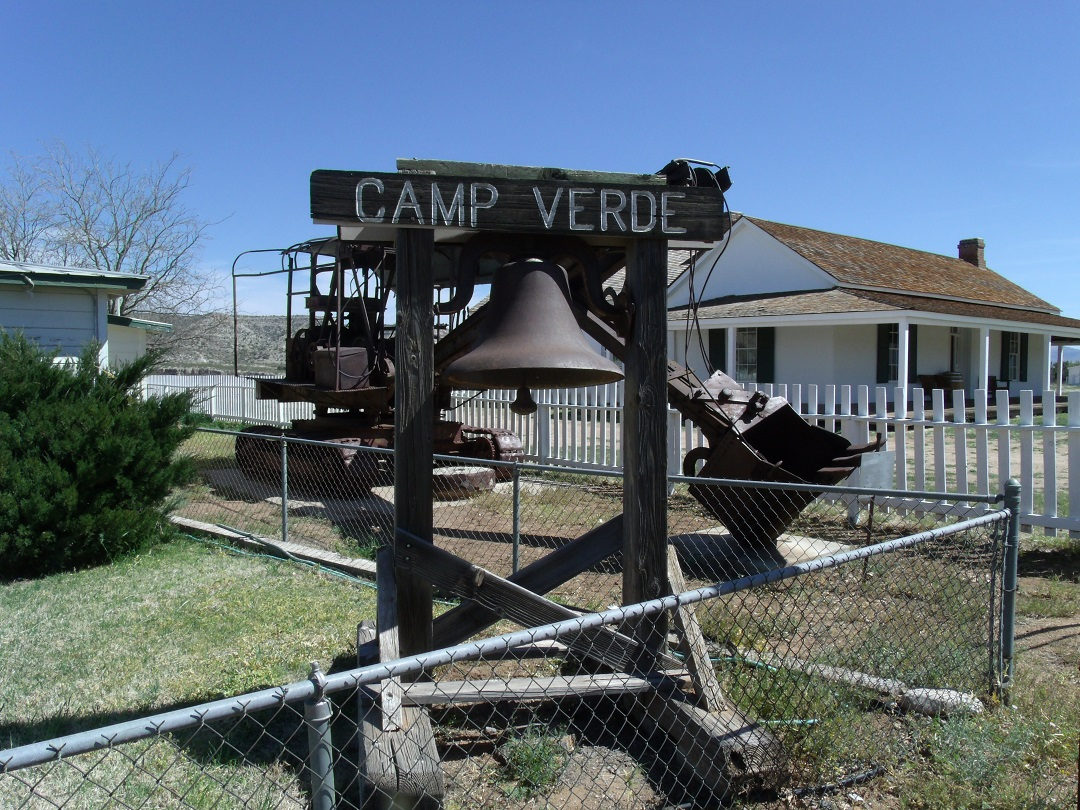
- Historic Camp Verde Bell

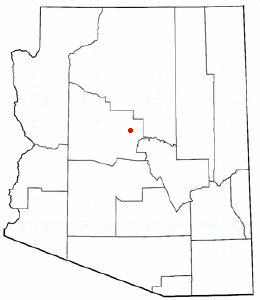
- Location in Yavapai County and the state of Arizona

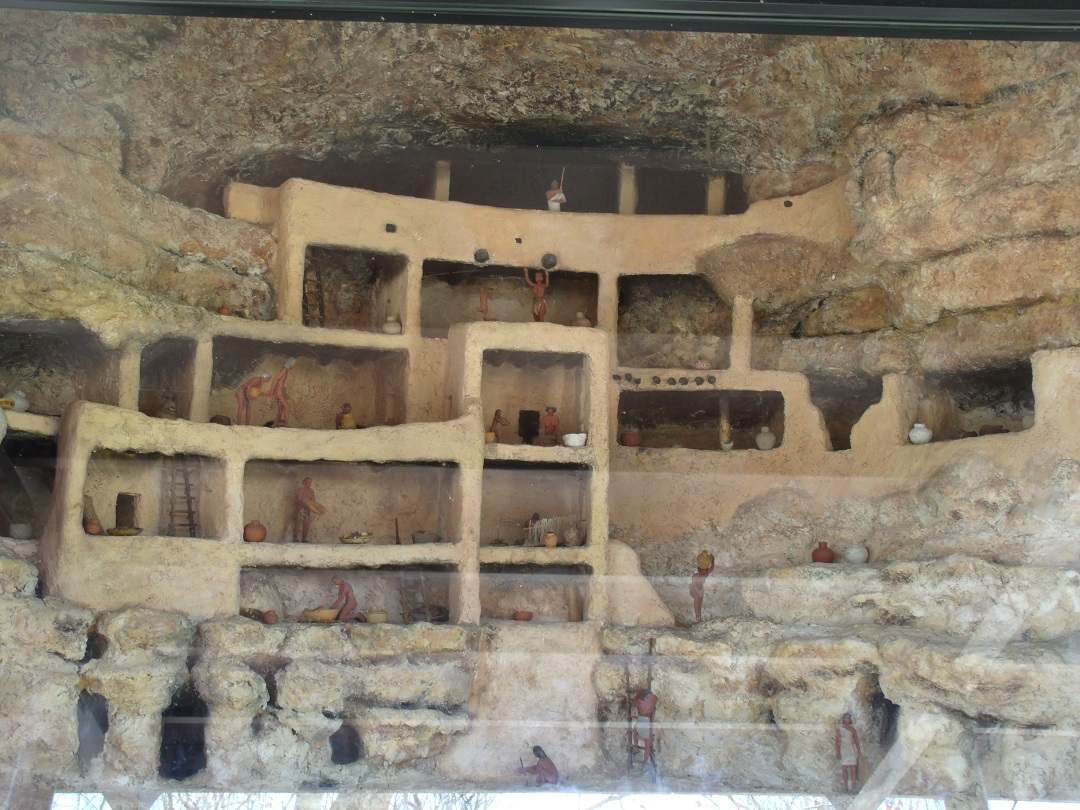
Display which shows how the Pre-Columbian Sinagua people lived in Montezuma Castle.

This is a list, which includes a photographic gallery, of some of the remaining historic properties in the town of Camp Verde, Arizona some of which are listed in the National Register of Historic Places. Also, included in this list is the Montezuma Castle National Monument and the Montezuma Well which are close to Camp Verde and which are also listed in the National Register of Historic Places.

== Brief history ==
During the Pre-Columbian era, the area was occupied by Sinagua people who built their dwellings in the cliffs of the Verde Valley Mountains between 1100 and 1425 CE. In 1583, Captain Antonio de Espejo and the Spanish conquistadors took possession of the Verde Valley.

In the 1860s settlers began to migrate into the Verde Valley to work in the mining industry. The United States Army established a minor post overlooking the farms which the settlers established in West Clear Water. A post called Camp Lincoln, which later was renamed Camp Verde, was established . In 1871, General George Crook established a military supply trail which connected Forts Whipple, Verde and Apache. There is marker to this effect located by the administration building in Camp Verde. In 1878, the camp became known as Fort Verde and remained occupied by the military until 1891.

In 1956, members of the community established a museum in the abandoned administration building of the fort. They restored some of the historic fort buildings and requested the establishment of a Historic State Park. The Arizona State Parks governmental agency protects and preserves said parks. The site was officially designated a Historic State Park in 1970.

In 1971, the Camp Verde Historical Society was founded. It is located at 435 South Main Street. The main objective of the society is to restore, preserve, reconstruct, and administer buildings and sites of historical significance in the Camp Verde area. The society also houses archival materials going back to the 1860s and maintains a research library. The town of Camp Verde was formally incorporated in 1986.

Camp Verde, however, does not have the authority to deny a demolition permit. Therefore, the owner of a property, listed either in the National Register of Historic Places or considered historical by the Camp Verde Historical Society, may demolish the historical property in question if they so desires. According to Jim McPherson, Arizona Preservation Foundation Board President: "It is crucial that residents, private interests, and government officials act now to save these elements of our cultural heritage before it is too late.”

== Fort Verde ==
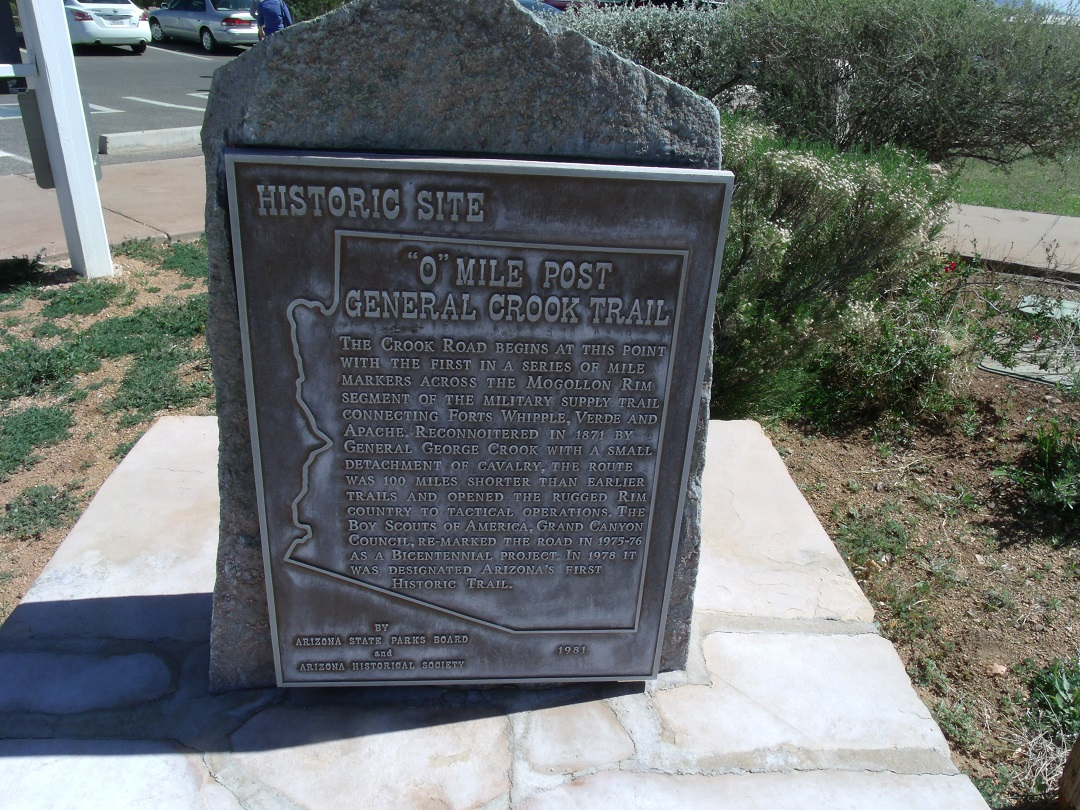
The "0" Mile General Crook Trail Marker

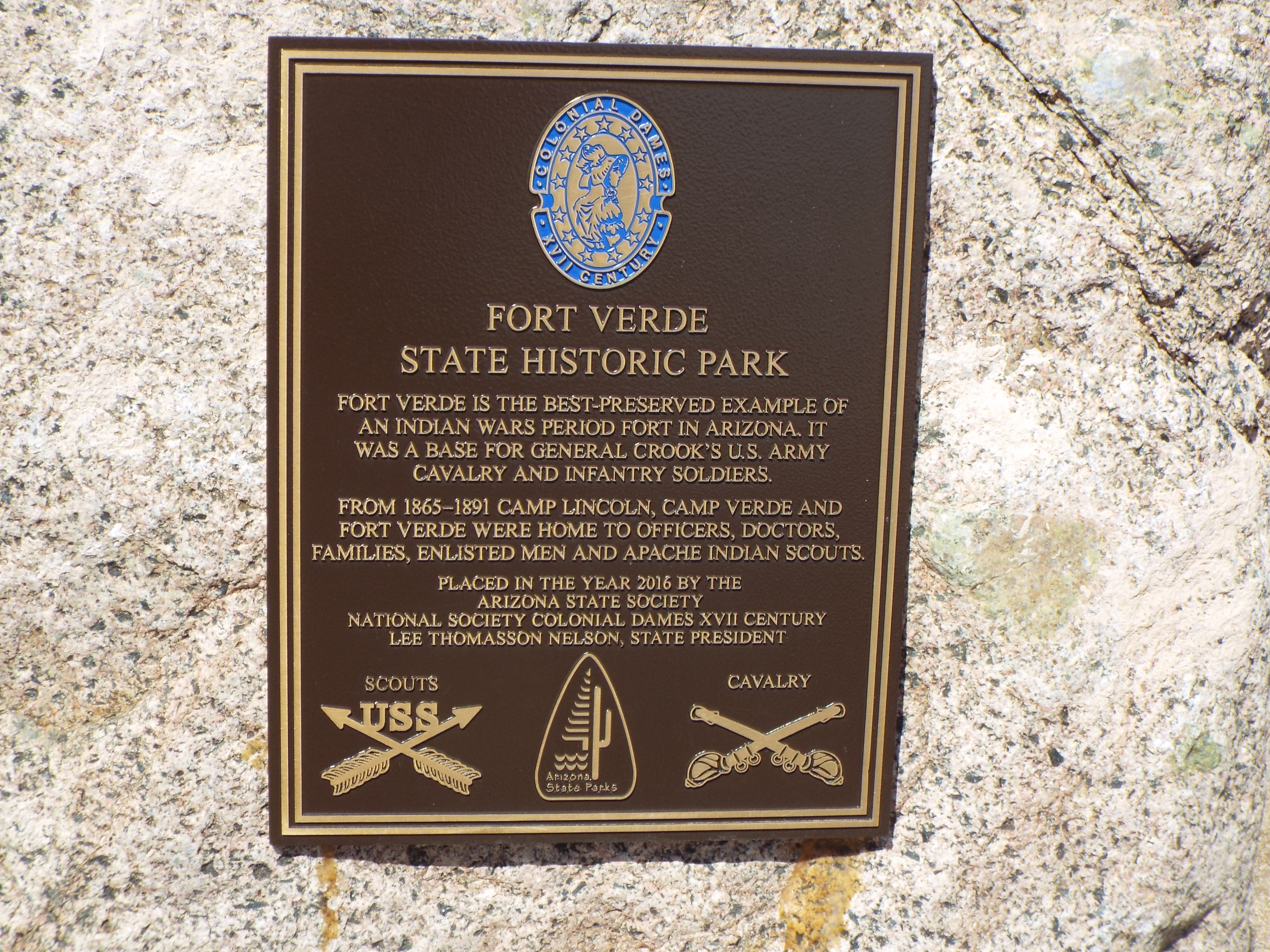
Historic State Park Marker

The following is a brief description of the historic properties that are pictured:

- The Fort Verde Administration Building – The administration building of Fort Verde was built in 1871 and is located at 125 E. Hollamon St. It contained the main offices from which the decisions as to the operations of the fort were made. It now houses the Visitor Center of the Fort Verde Museum and contains exhibits, period artifacts from military life, and history on the Indian Scouts and Indian Wars era. There is also a display dedicated to the Buffalo soldiers.
- The 7th Calvary's Trumpet (a.k.a. "Bugale") used by Lieutenant Colonel George Armstrong Custer's bugler. It was found in 1878 on the grounds of the Little Bighorn Battlefield (Custer's Last Stand) and is on display in Camp Verde.
- The Old Camp Verde Bell – The bell is located on the grounds of the historic 1916 George Hance House at 229 Coppinger Street.
- The Commanding Officer Quarters – The Commanding Officer Quarters was built in 1871 and is in the grounds of the Fort Verde Museum.
- The Bachelor Officers’ Quarters – The Bachelor Officers’ Quarters is also in the grounds of the Fort Verde Museum.
- The Doctor's & Surgeons Quarters – Also in the grounds of the Fort Verde Museum.
- The George Hance House – The Hance House was built in 1916 and is located at 229 Coppinger Street. George Hance was a veteran of the American Civil War who served as Camp Verdes first postmaster. For almost 30 years, George Hance served as the unincorporated community's unofficial Mayor. Hance was also a Justice of the Peace, notary public and cattleman. The house is now a museum and is owned by the Camp Verde Historical Society. It is located in the Fort Verde District, which was added to the National Register of Historic Places in 1971, reference #71000120.

== Historic properties and artifacts pictured ==
The following is a gallery with images of the historic structures in Camp Verde some of which are listed in the National Register of Historic Places. Others are considered historical by the Camp Verde Historical Society. Some of the historic properties have more than one image on this list and are pictured in different angles thereby giving a different architectural perspective of the property style and design. Also included are images of historical artifacts.

Historic structures and artifacts of Fort Verde

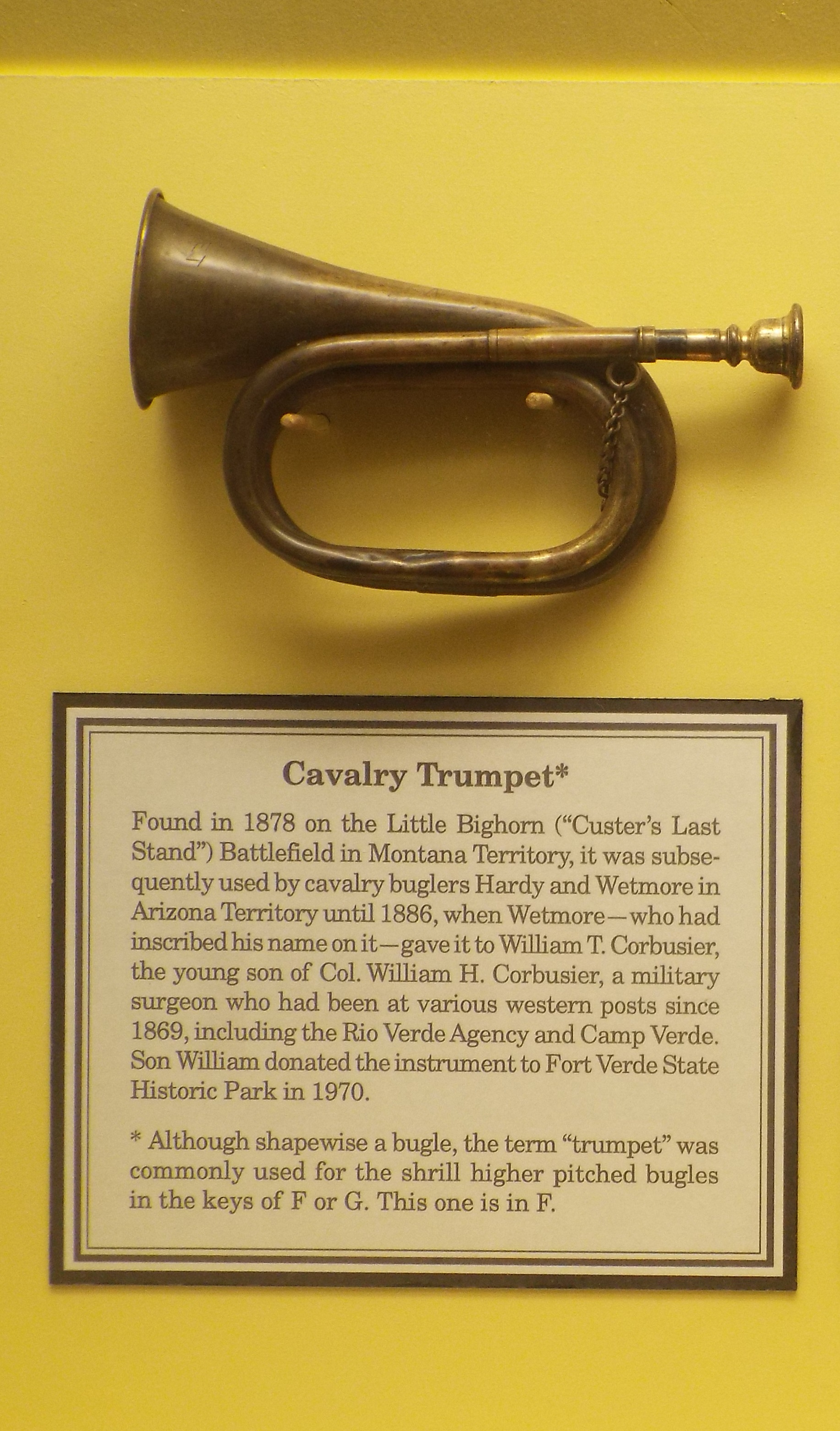
7th Cavalry Bugle (Trompet)

(NRHP = National Register of Historic Places)
(CVHS=Verde Camp Verde Historical Society-listed)
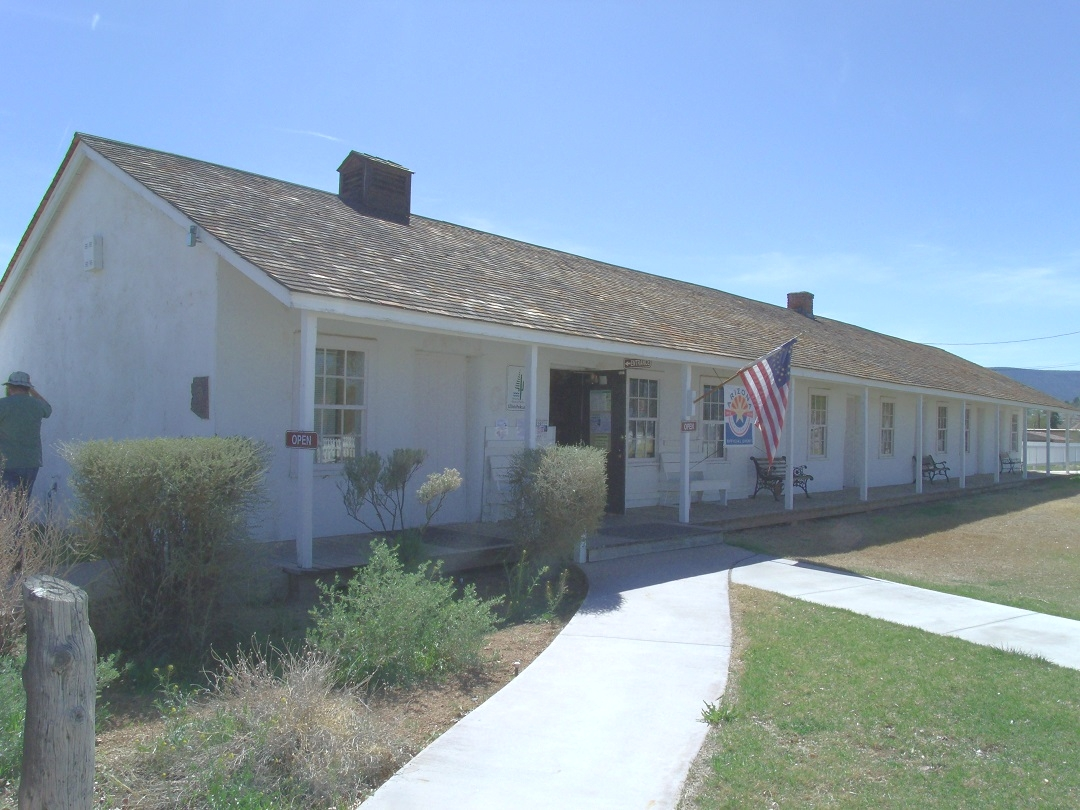
The Fort Verde Administration Building.

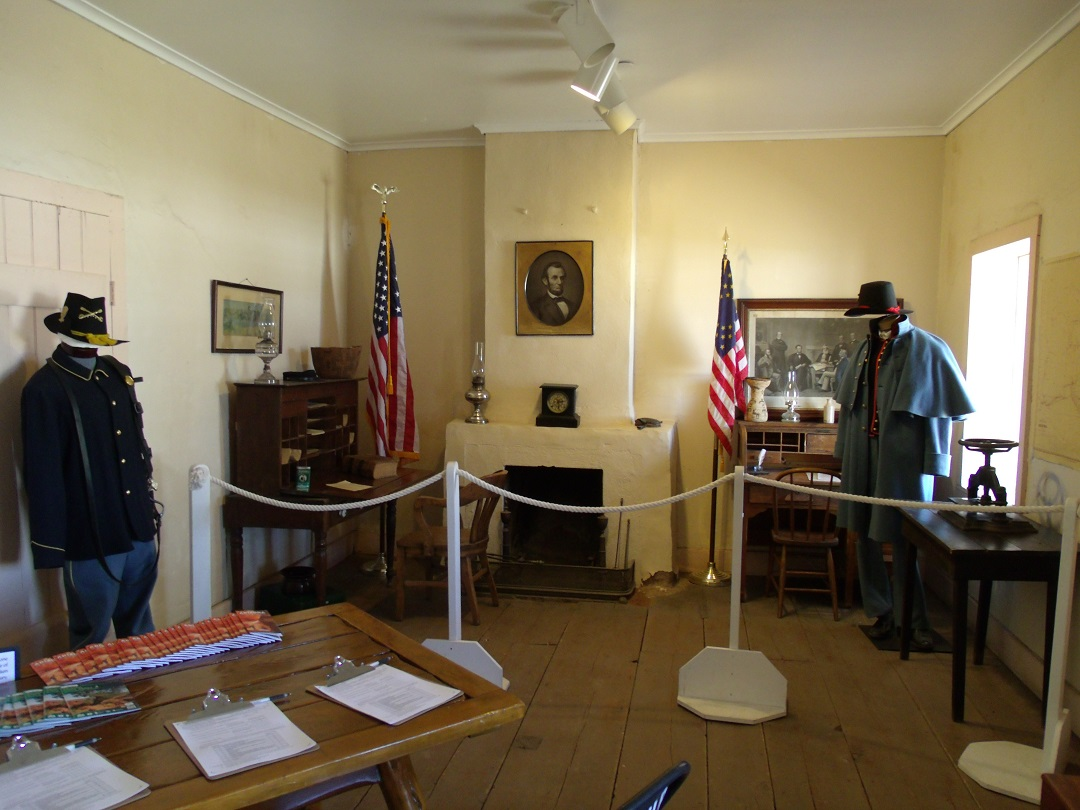
Inside the Commanding Officers Office in the Administration Building.

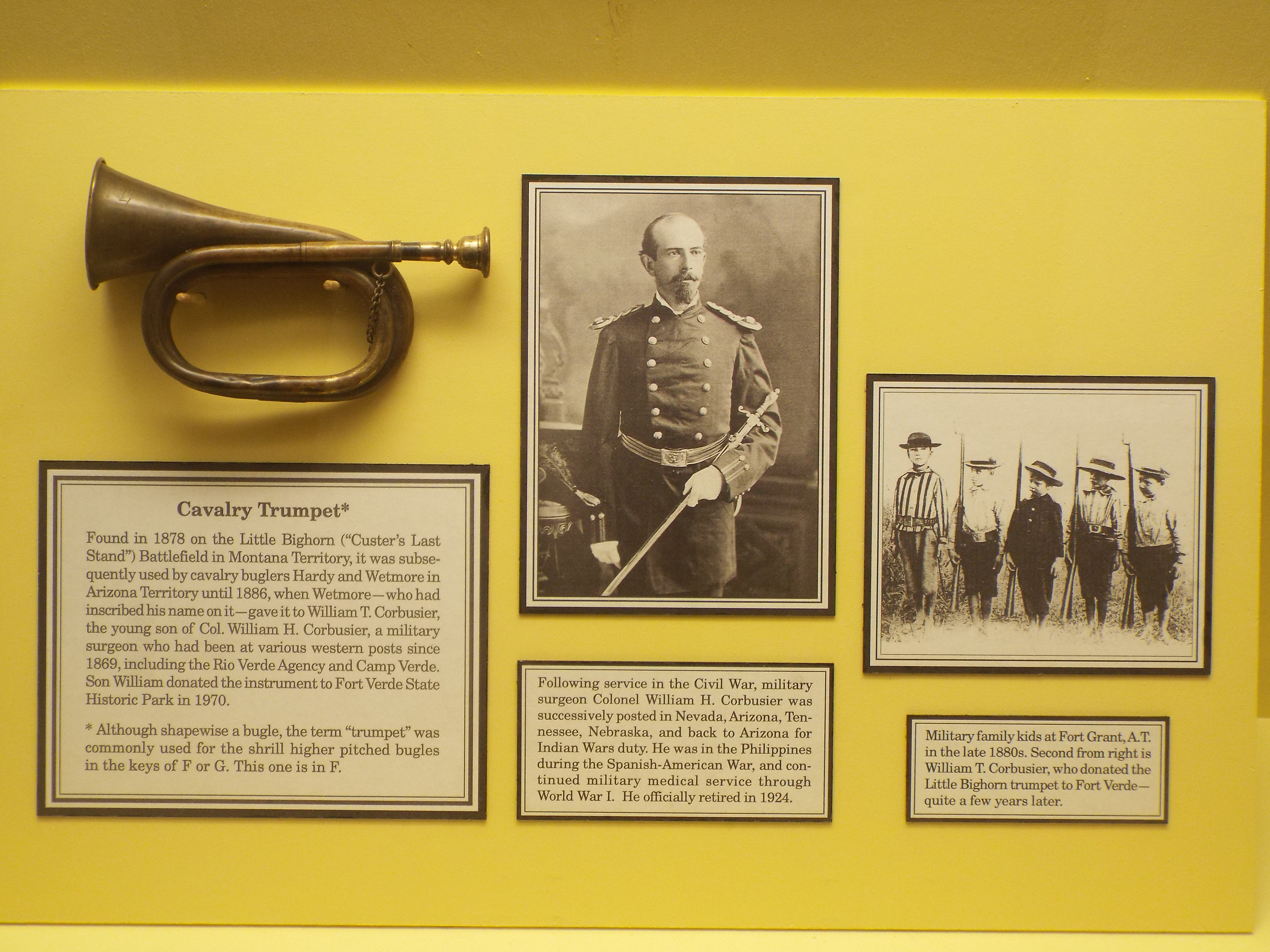
7th Cavalry Bugle

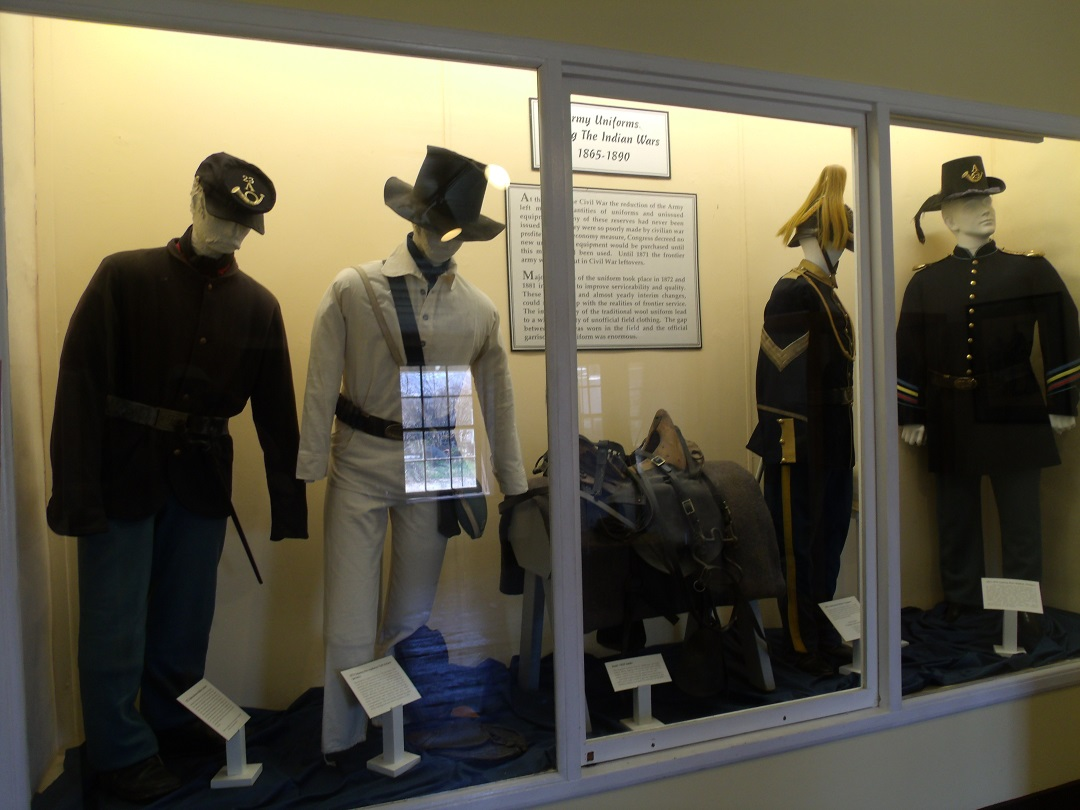
Display of uniforms in the Administration Building.

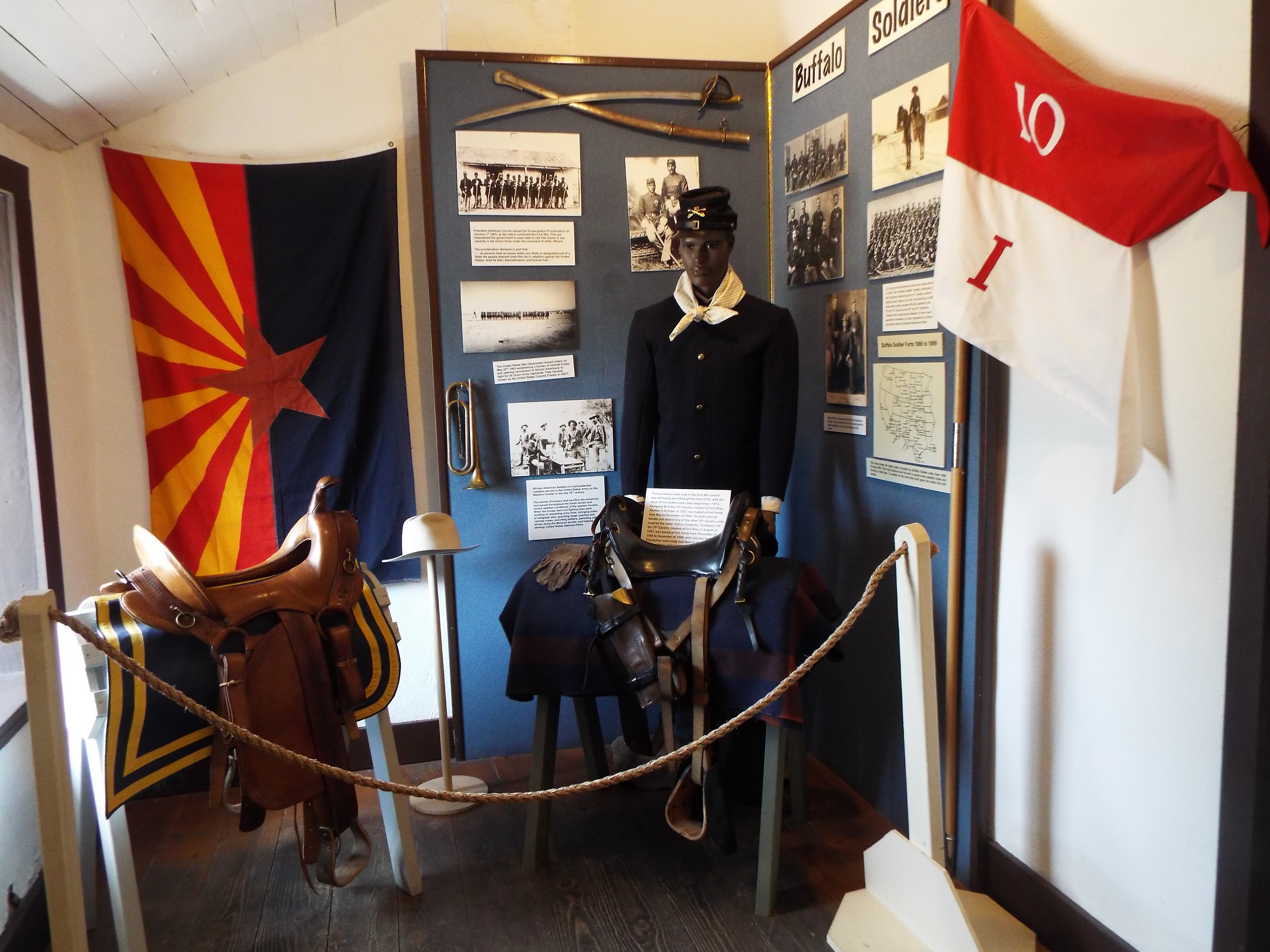
Buffalo soldiers exhibit

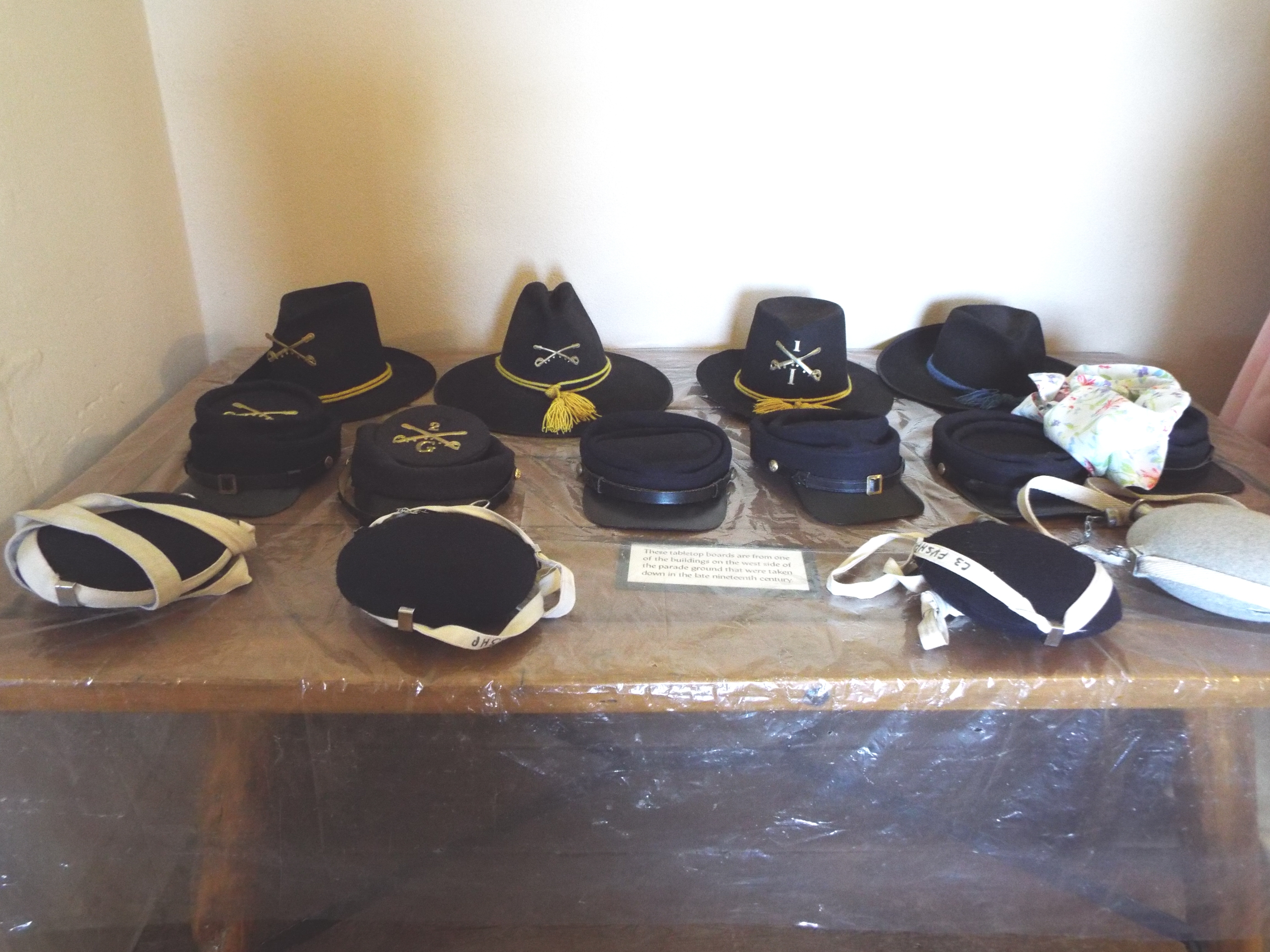
Military hats worn in Fort Verde

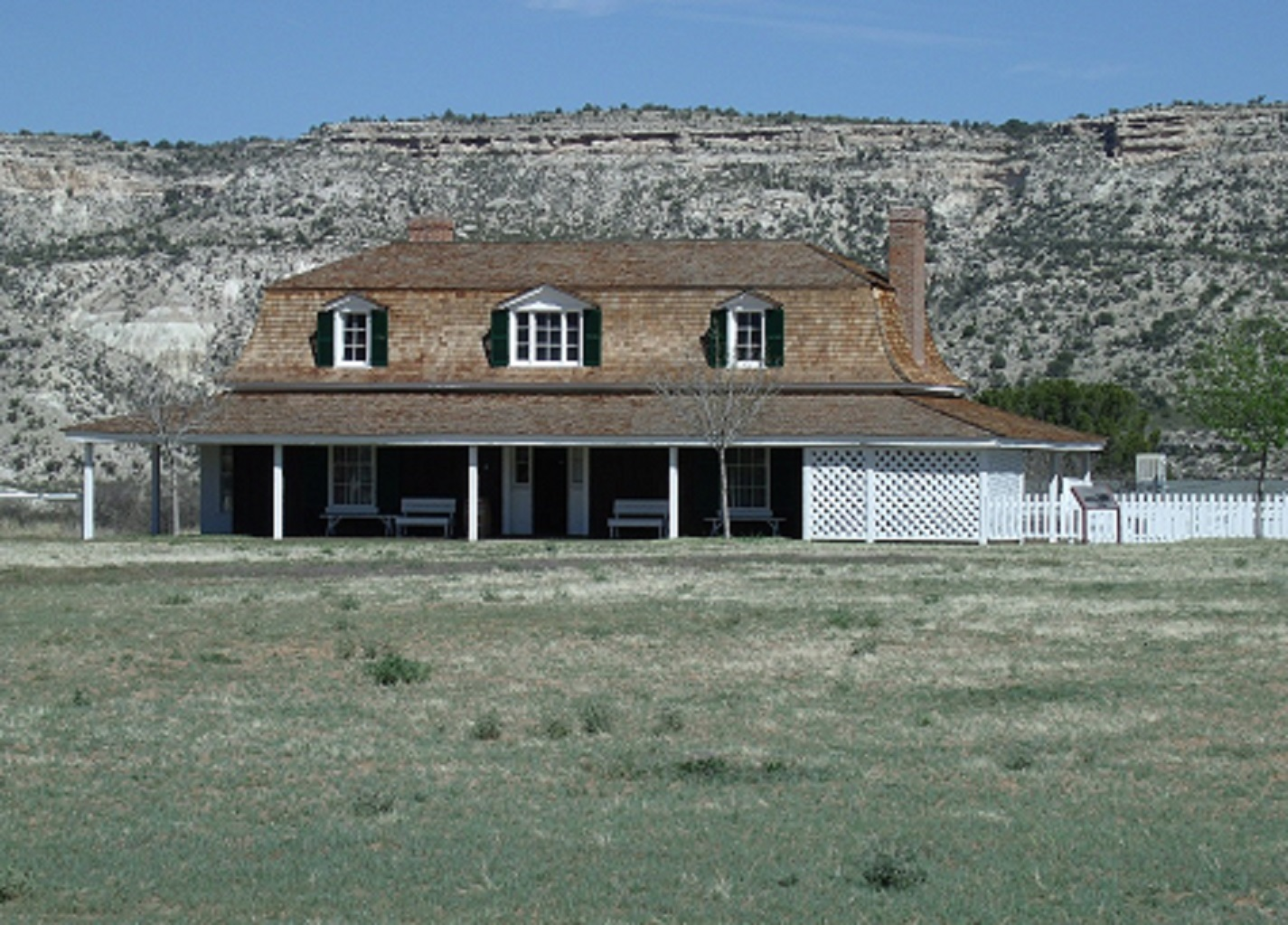
The Commanding Officer Quarters

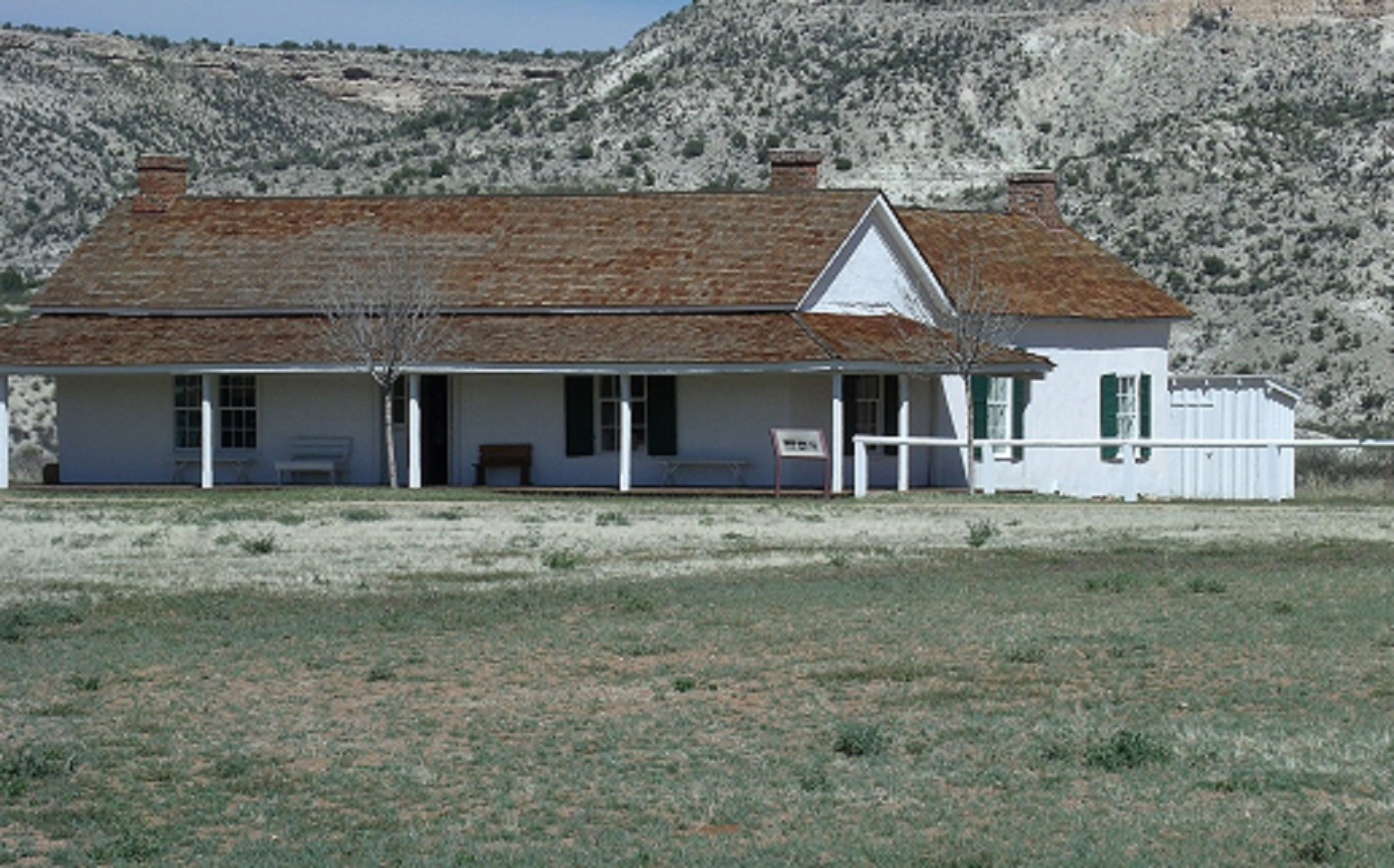
The Bachelor Officers’ Quarters.

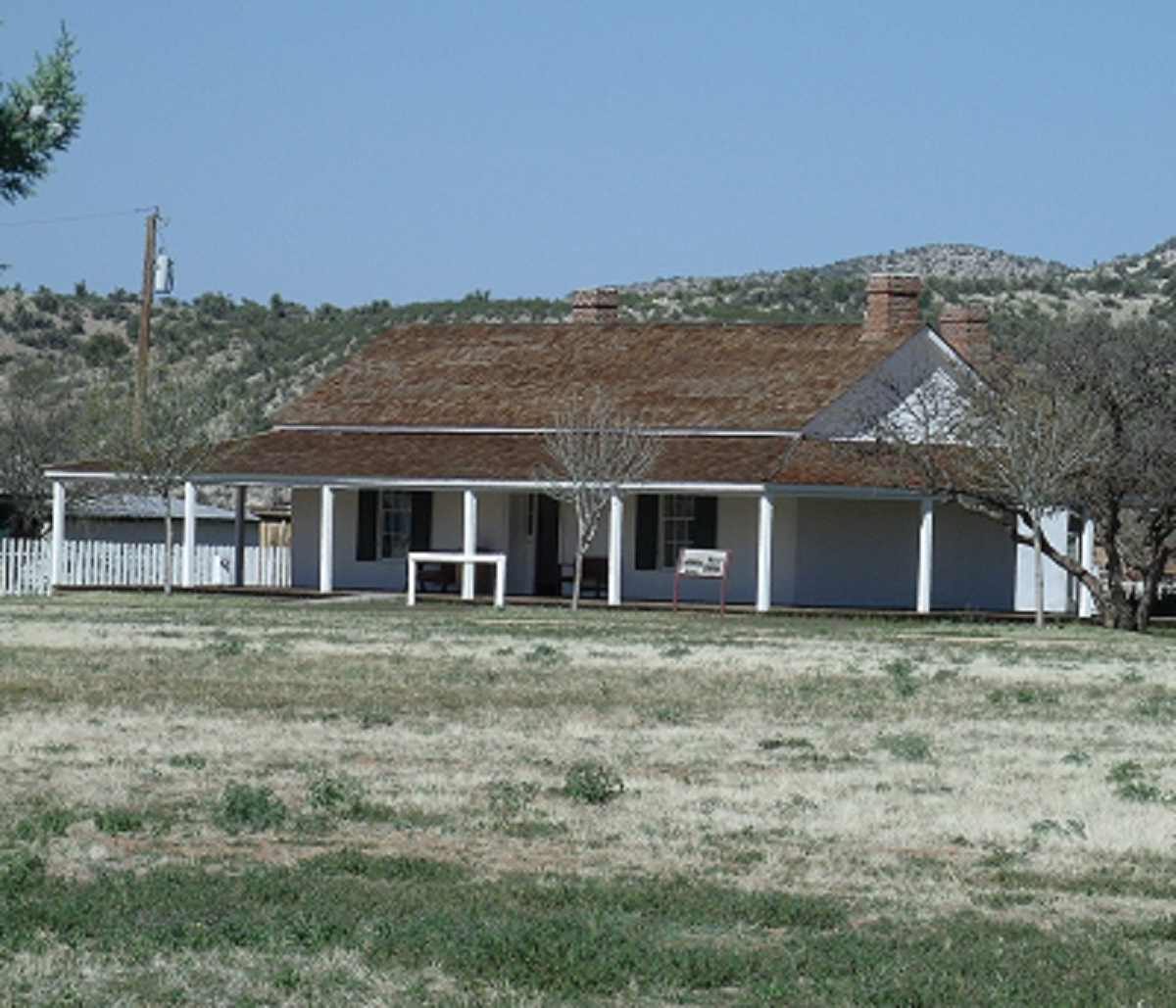
The Doctor’s & Surgeons Quarters.

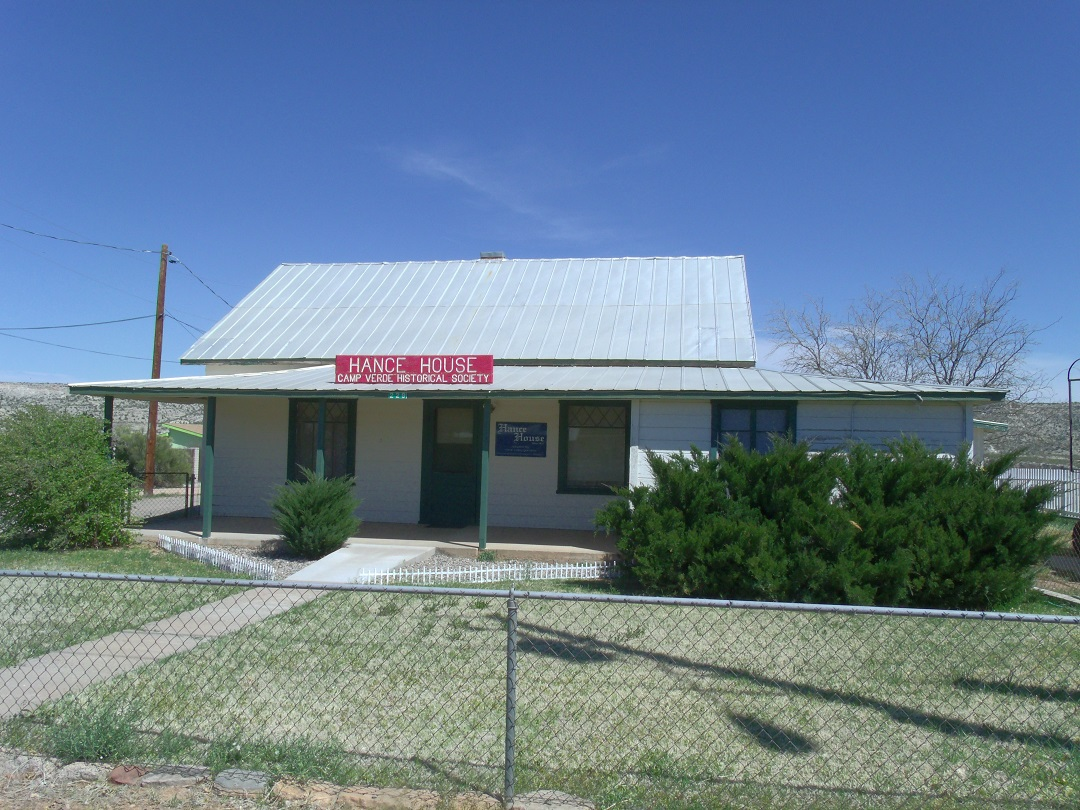
The George Hance House.

== Historic properties and structures pictured ==
The following are historic structures within the town of Camp Verde:

- The Wingfields Mercantile Store – The store which served the community was built in the 1880s.
- The Clear Creek Church – The church was built in 1898 and is located on Clear Creek Road 3.5 mi. SE of Camp Verde. The builders placed in the cornerstone of the building a bible and a $5 gold piece (which was chiseled away in the 1920s). It was Camp Verde's only church until 1913, when it was transformed into the city's one-room schoolhouse. In 1946, the church was abandoned. Today Clear Creek Church is preserved and under the care of the Camp Verde Historical Society. It was listed in the National Register of Historic Places on August 6, 1975, reference #75000362.
- The 1911 Wingfield Building – The building is located in the Wingfield Sutler District. This part of the building was added to the original 1860s structure. The structure is located on the grounds which has the distinction of being the oldest, continuously operating business in Yavapai County and the first stop on the historic pony express between Camp Verde and Payson, Arizona. It is located at 564 S. Main Street and considered historical by the Camp Verde Historic Society.
- The 1916 Building – This building is also located in the Wingfield Sutler District. It was an addition to original 1860s structure.
- The Wingfield, Hank and Myrtle, Homestead House – The homestead house a.k.a. "Crooked "H" Ranch House", was built in 1917 at 806 E. Quarterhorse Lane. It was listed in the National Register of Historic Places in 1999, reference #99000857.
- The Don Bell House – The Bell house was built in 1917 at 2530 Anupaya Lane. It was listed in the National Register of Historic Places in 2004, reference #04000513
- The Camp Verde Bath House – The bath house was built c. 1919. It is near 301 Woods Street and is currently used as a public restroom.
- The Rock Jail The Rock Jail was built in 1933 at 44 Hollamon Street. In 1933, during the Great Depression, federal money started making its way to Yavapai County. One of President Franklin D. Roosevelt’s first major relief efforts under the Civil Works Administration was a new jail for Camp Verde.
- The Boler's Bar – The bar was built in 1934 and is located at 325 S. Main Street. When the building first opened it housed the Camp Verde Cafe. The building is currently occupied by the Verde Brewing Company.
- The Montezuma Inn building – built in 1900 at 396 S. Main Street. Constructed as the Joe Lane Saloon, the building was also known as the Red Star Saloon due to the colorful stenciled star over the door. The original structure included a false front facade to give the cheaply built wood building a more imposing appearance.
Historic structures in Camp Verde
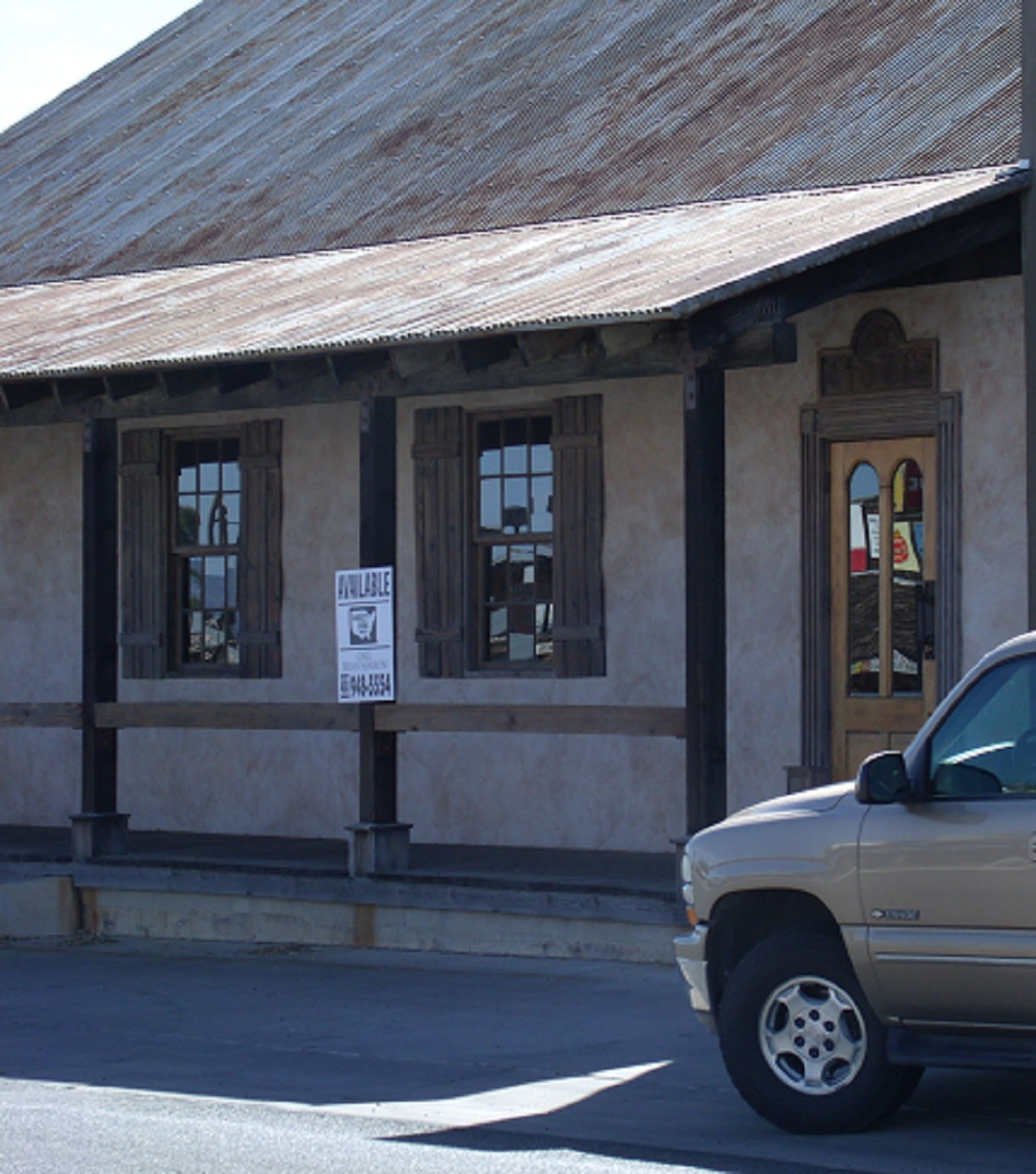
The Wingfields Mercantile Store.

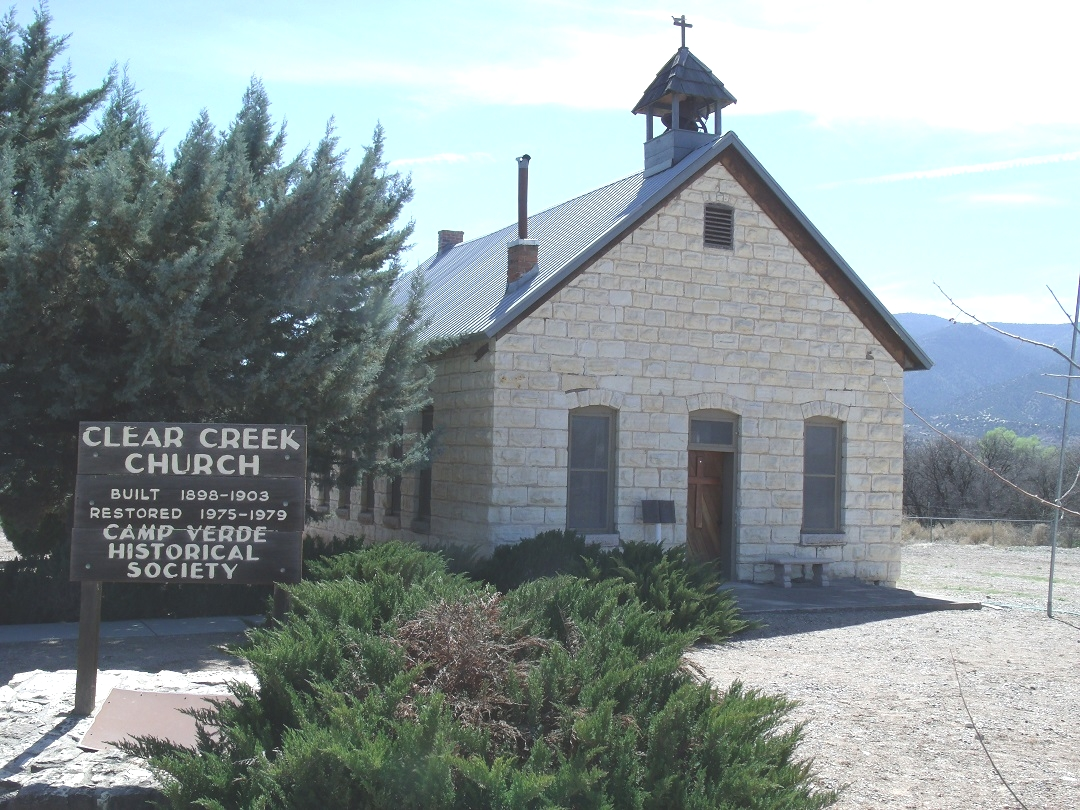
The Clear Creek Church.

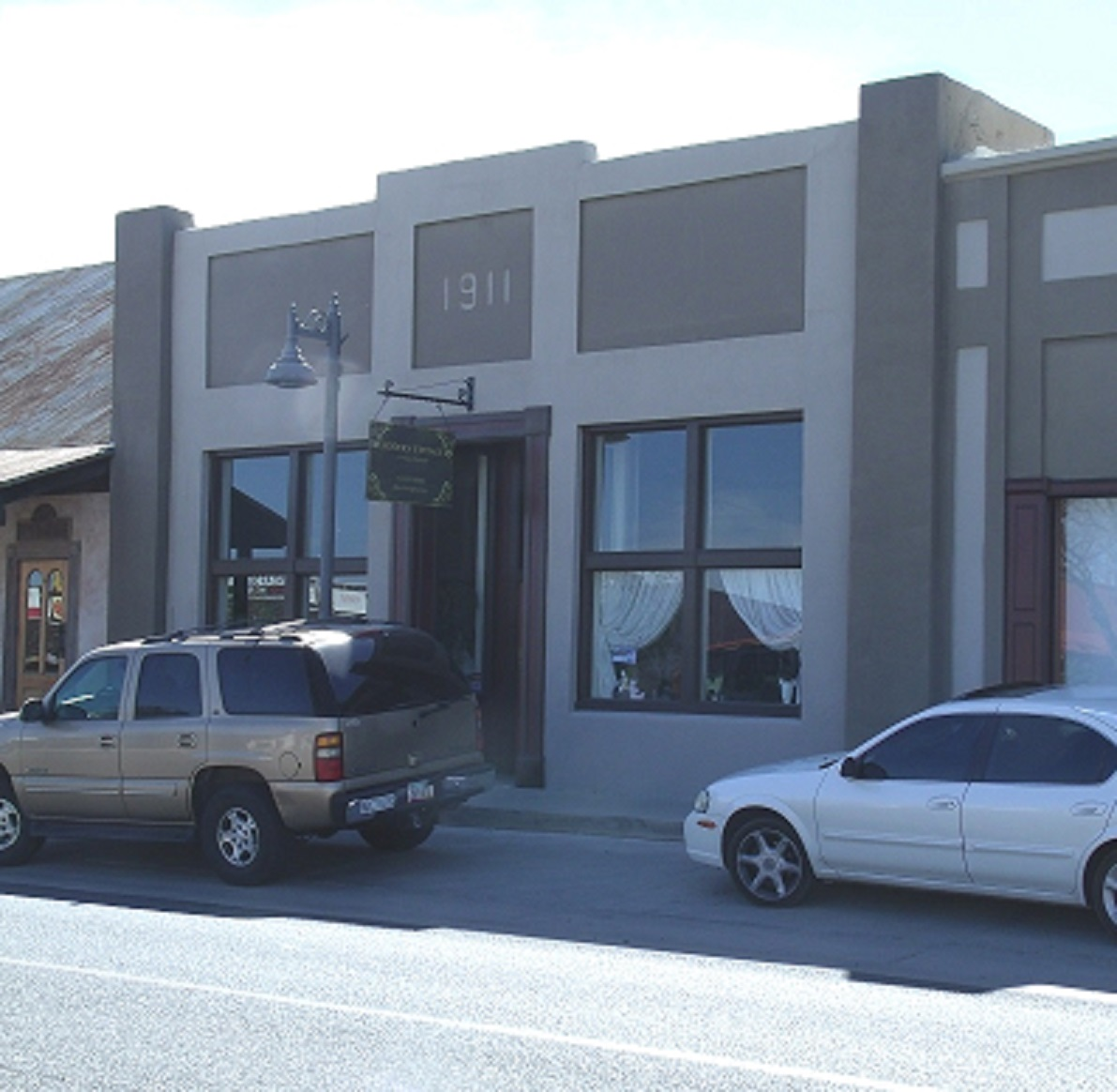
The 1911 Wingfield Building.

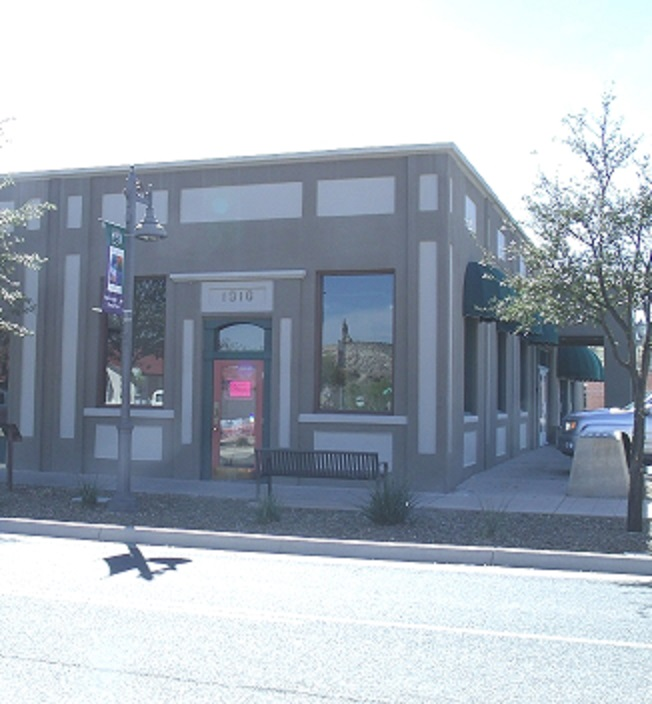
The 1916 Wingfield Building.

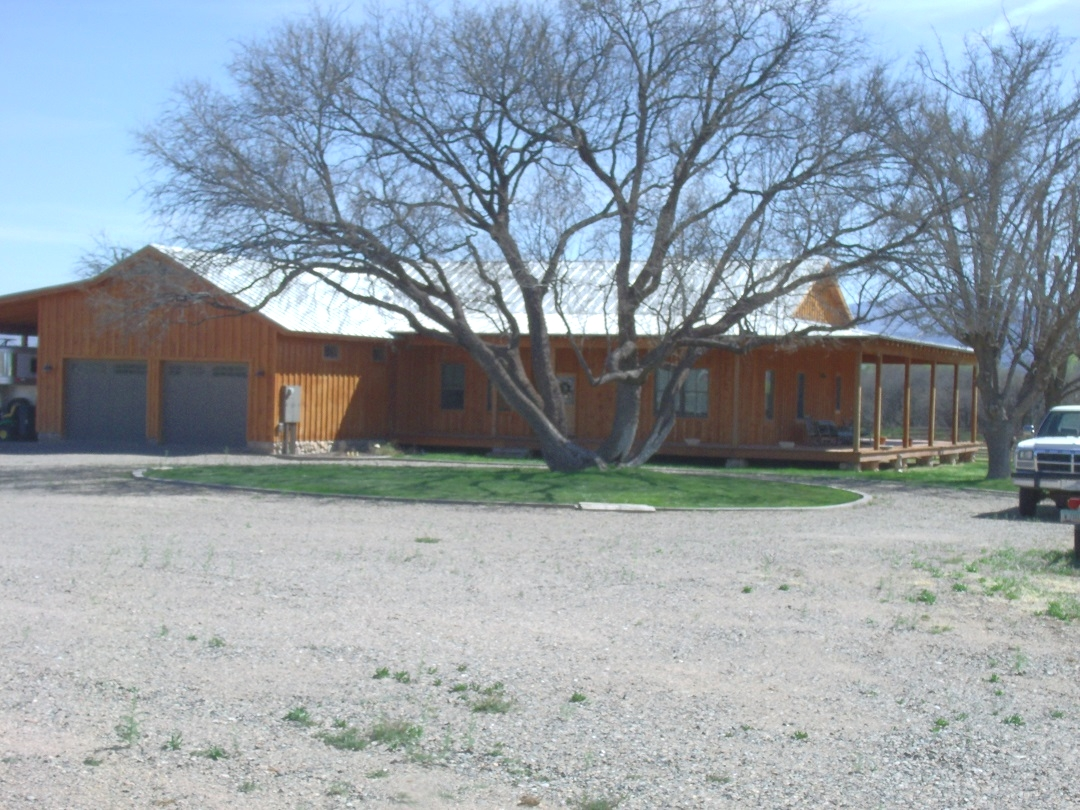
The Wingfield, Hank and Myrtle, Homestead House, a.k.a." Crooked "H" Ranch House".

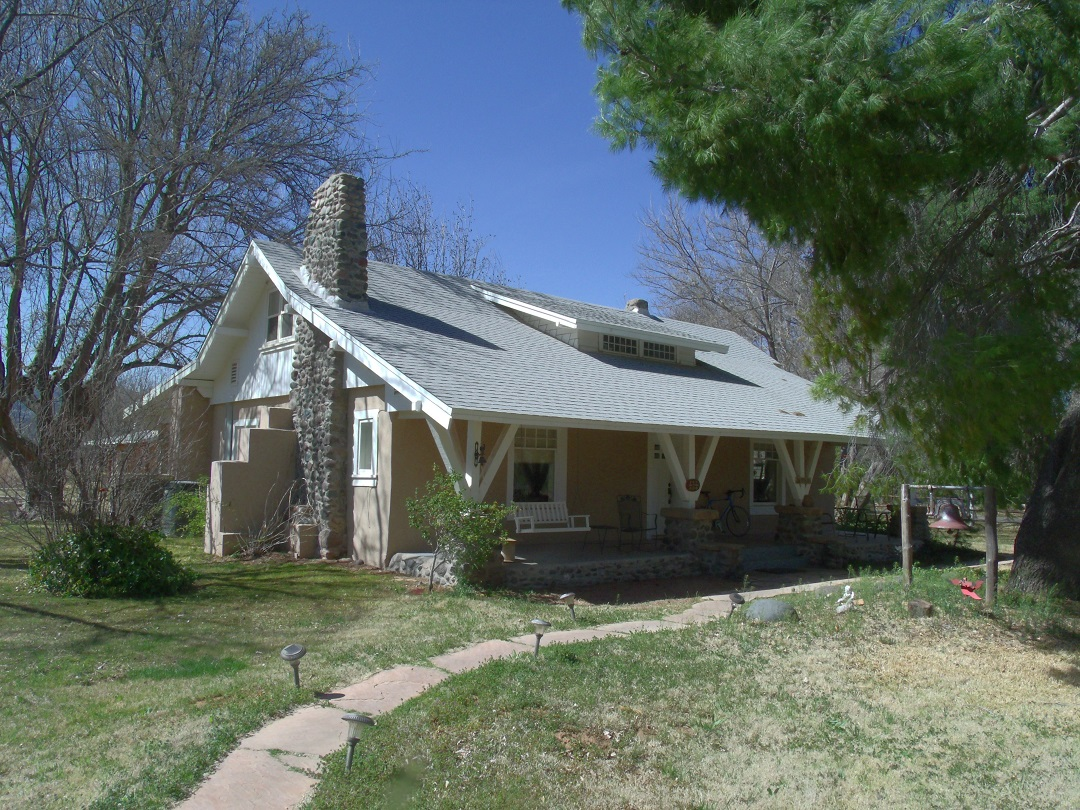
The Don Bell House.

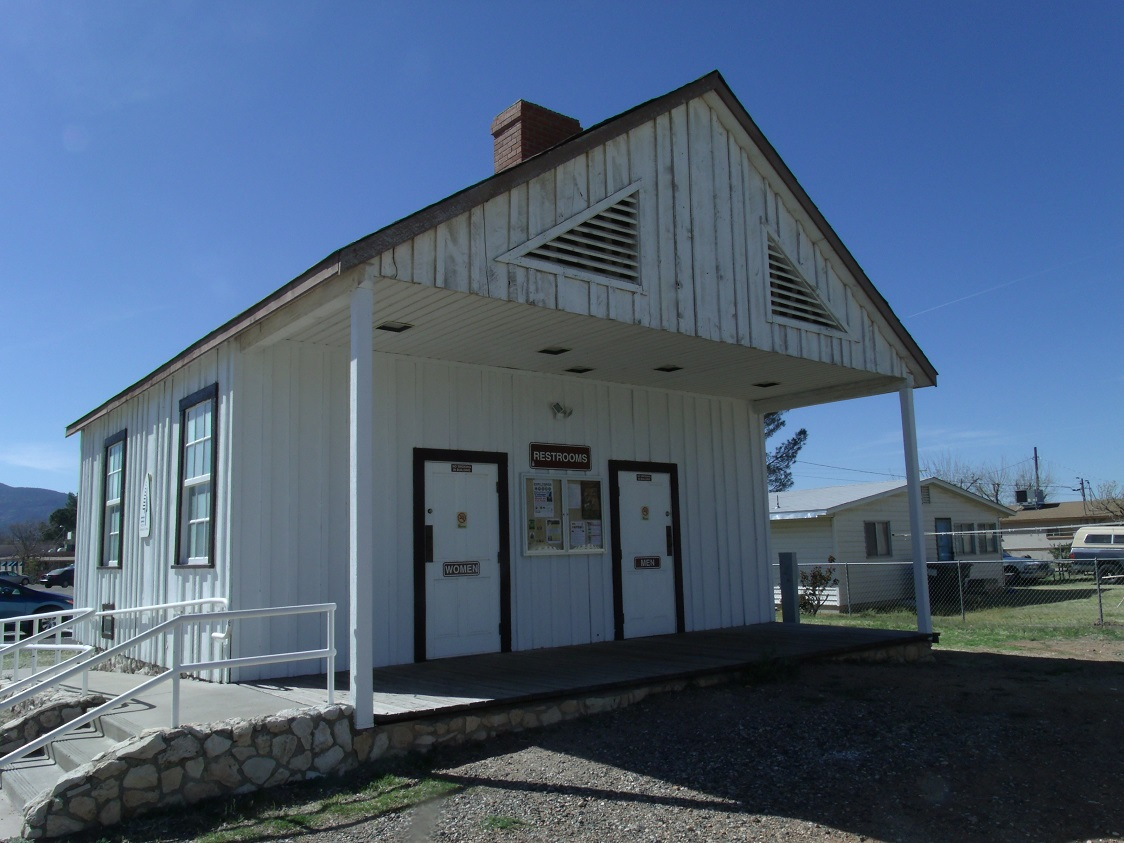
This Camp Verde Bath House.

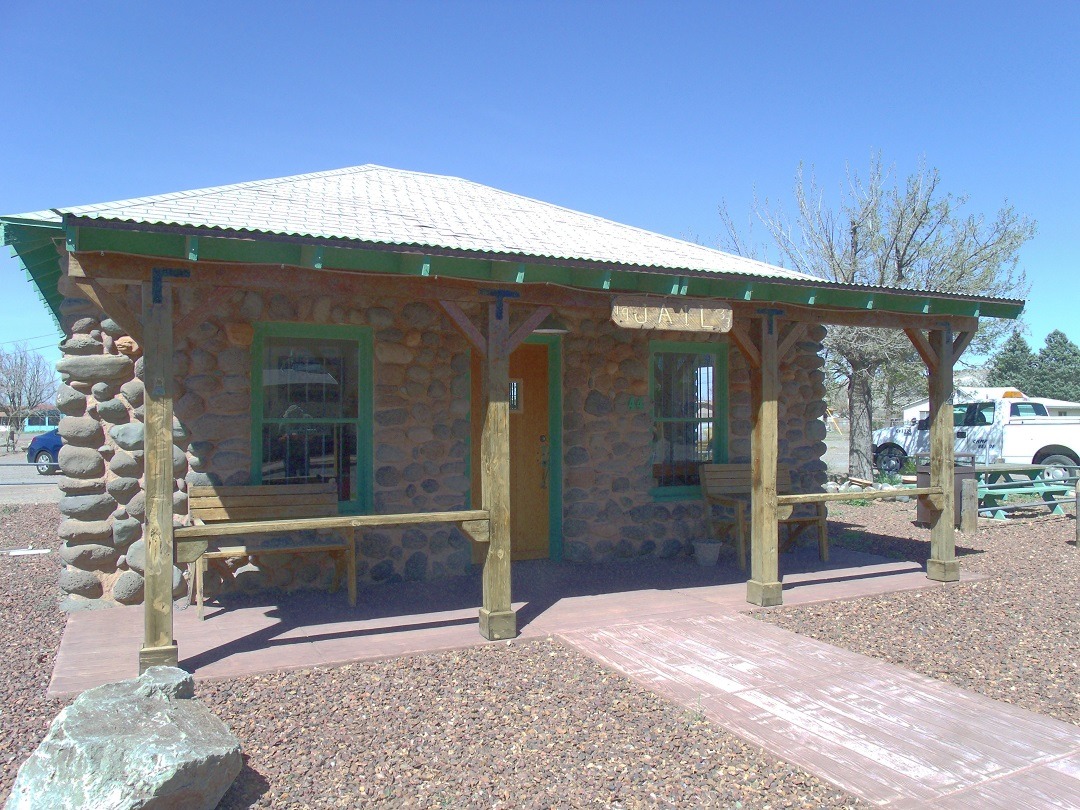
The Rock Jail.

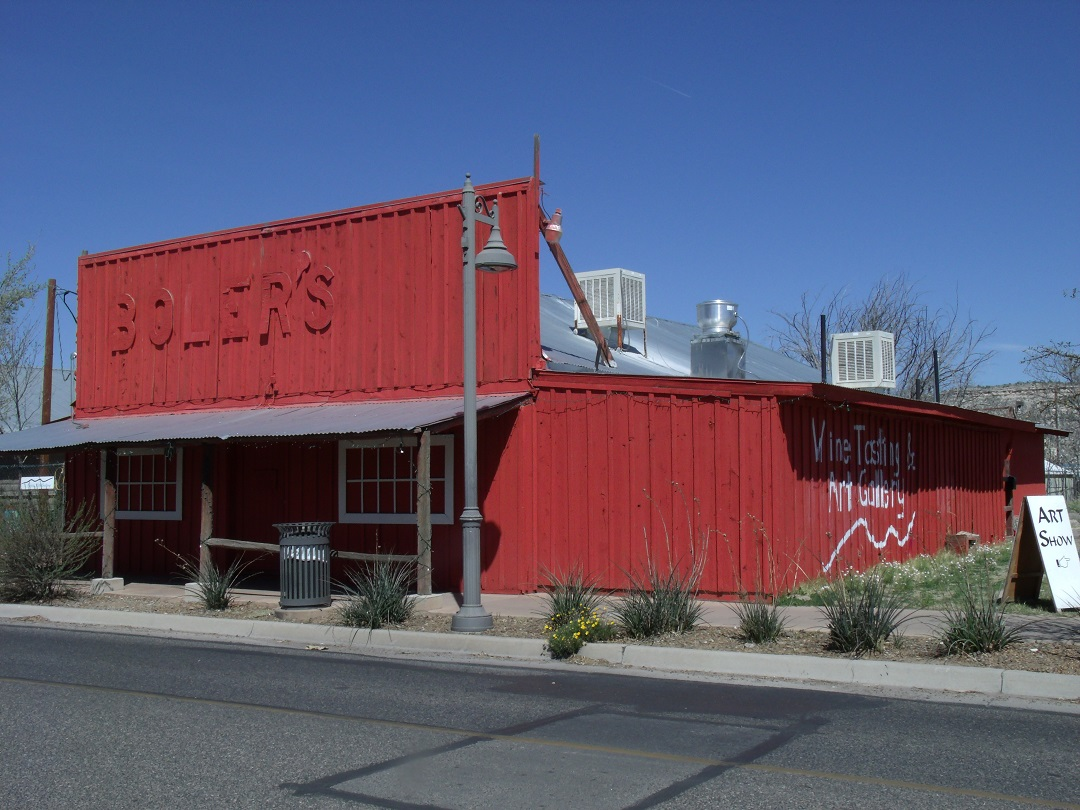
The Boler's Bar.

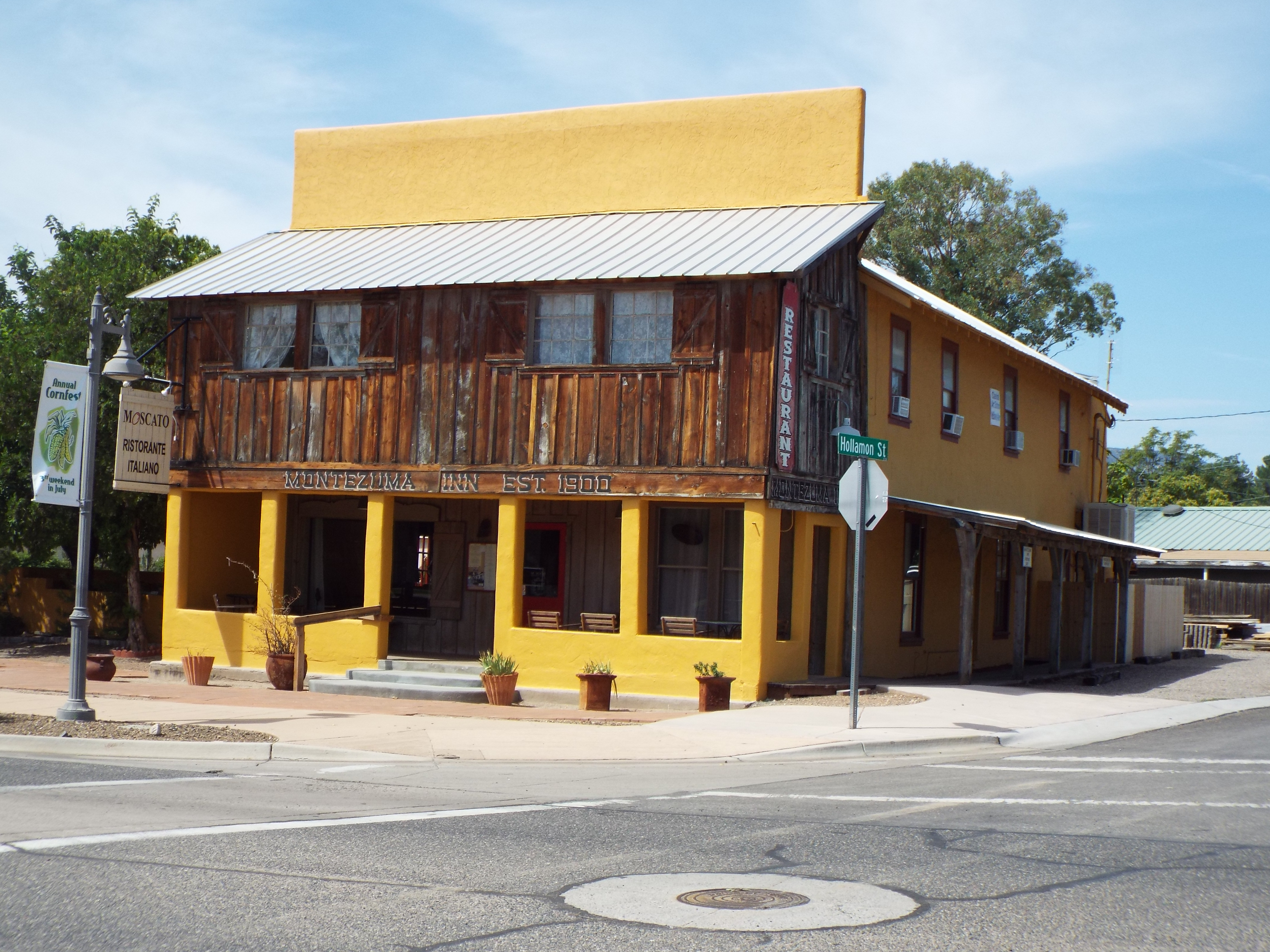
The Montezuma Inn/Red Star Saloon.

== Montezuma Castle ==
- Montezuma Castle – Montezuma Castle is a historic cliff dwelling located in Montezuma Castle National Monument. The dwelling was built and used by the Pre-Columbian Sinagua people. It was occupied from approximately 1100–1425 CE, and occupation peaked around 1300. Early European settlers believed that the builders were of the Aztec tribe and named the dwellings after Montezuma II, the Aztec emperor of Mexico.
- The Cliff and cave dwellings – The Sinagua people built additional cliff and cave dwellings next to the Montezuma Castle.
Montezuma Castle

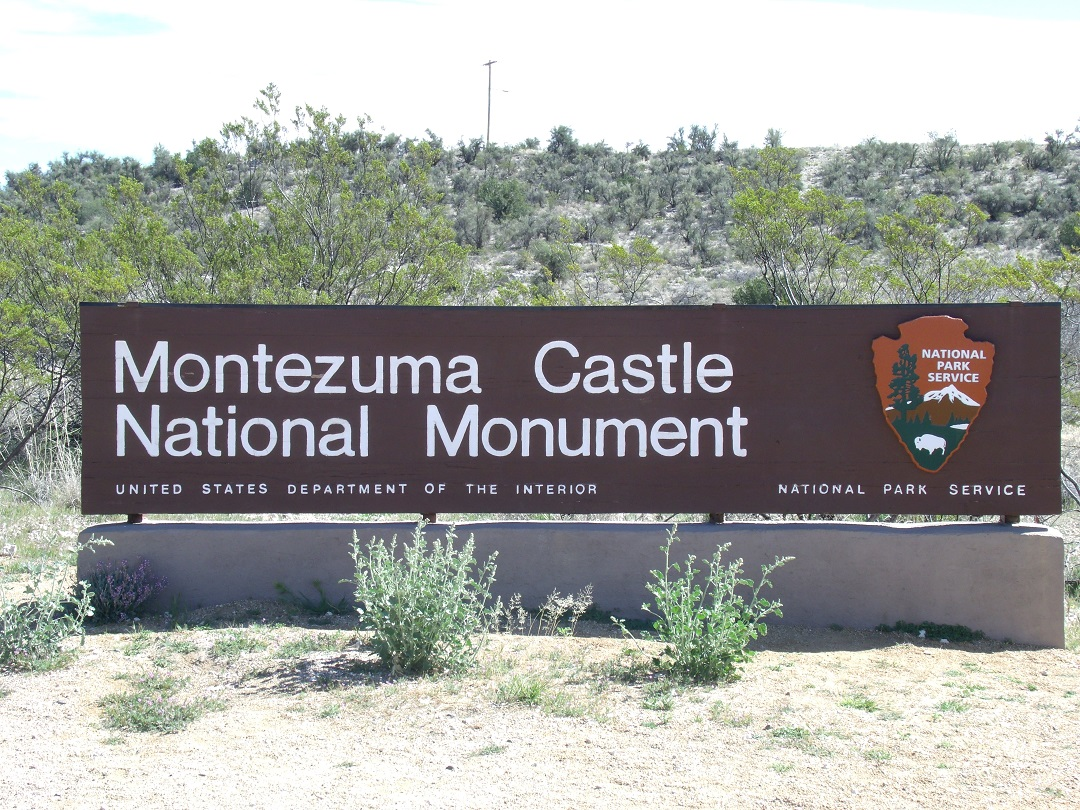
Montezuma Castle National Monument entrance sign

(NRHP = National Register of Historic Places)
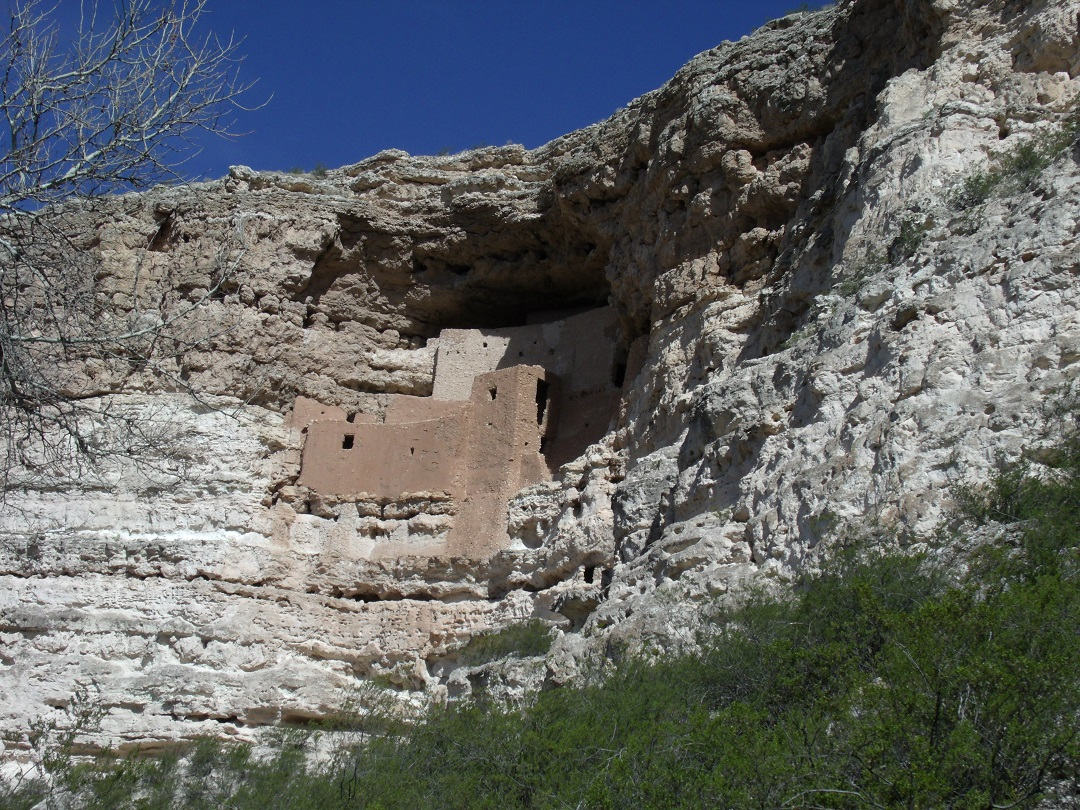
Montezuma Castle.

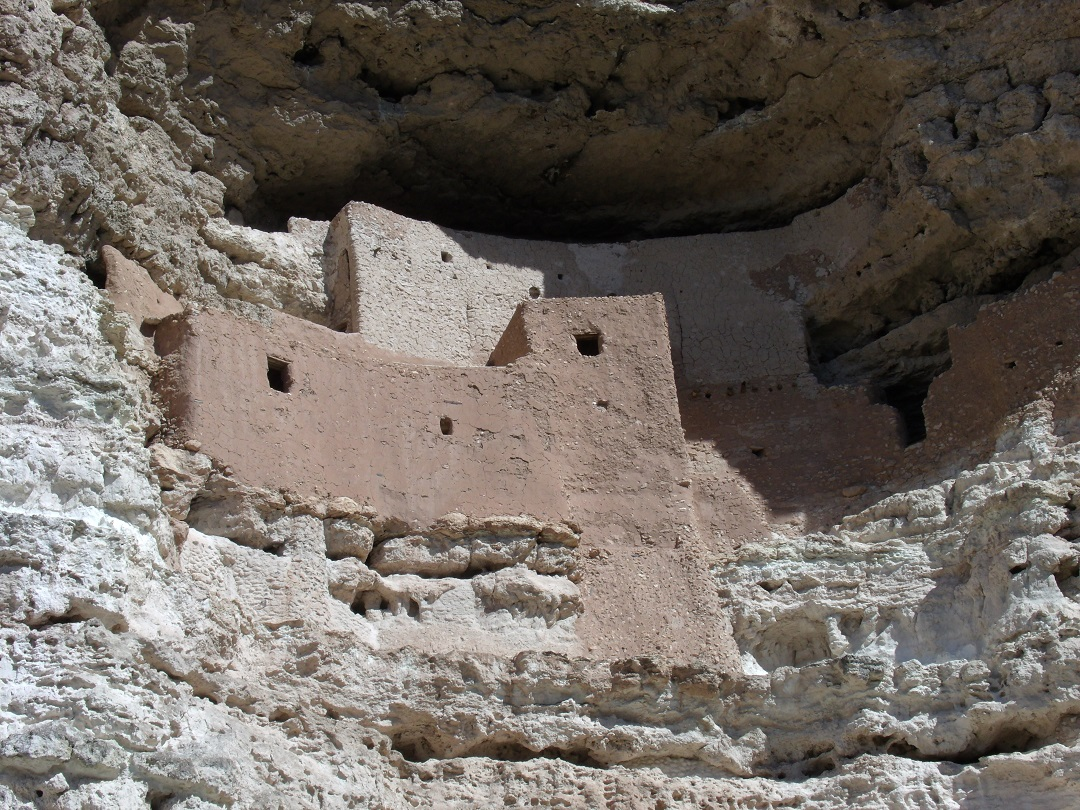
Montezuma Castle.

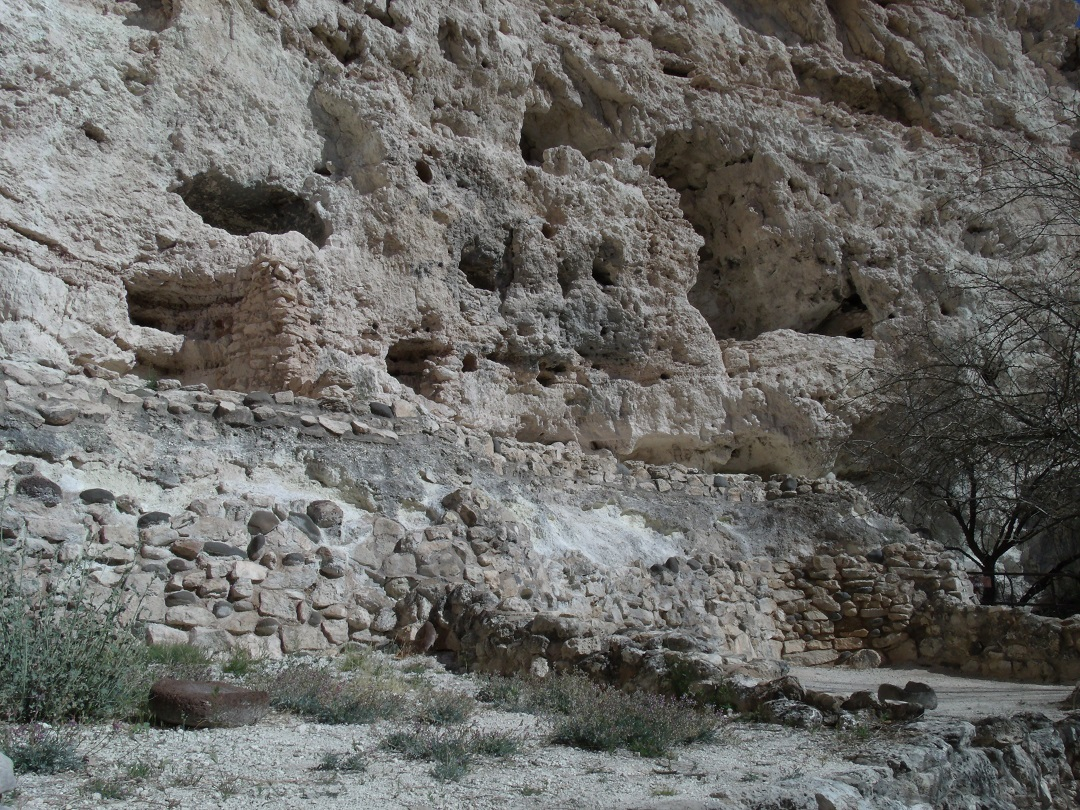
The Cliff and cave dwellings.

== Montezuma Well ==
- Montezuma Well – The Montezuma Well is a detached unit of the Montezuma Castle National Monument located near Rimrock and Camp Verde. The Montezuma Well is a natural limestone sinkhole. It is listed in the National Register of Historic Places, reference #66000082.
- Cliff dwellings – The cliff dwellings of the Sinagua people in the Montezuma Well.
- Pit-house ruins – Ruins of a Sinagua pit house, which dates back to 1050 CE. The two largest holes in the dirt floor held the timber which supported the roof. The holes around the edge reveal the outline of the structure.
- Ruins of a Sinagua House – The Ruins of a Sinagua house which dates back to 1050.
Montezuma Well
(NRHP = National Register of Historic Places)
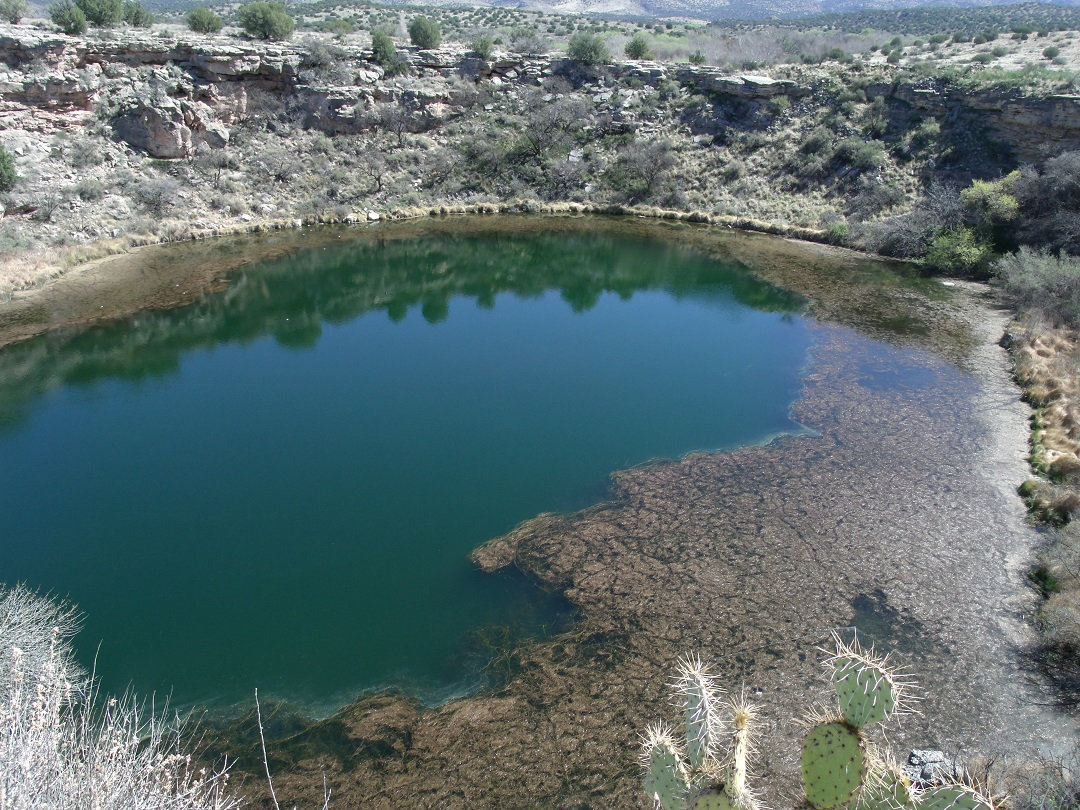
Montezuma Well.

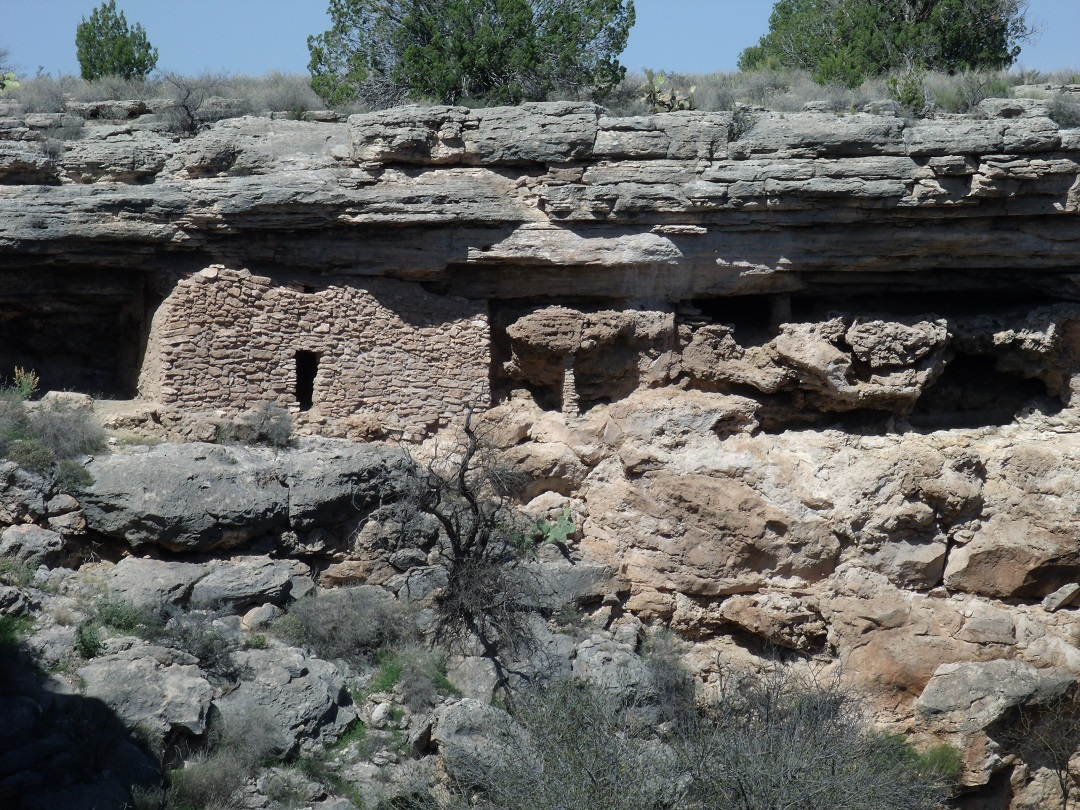
Cliff dwellings.

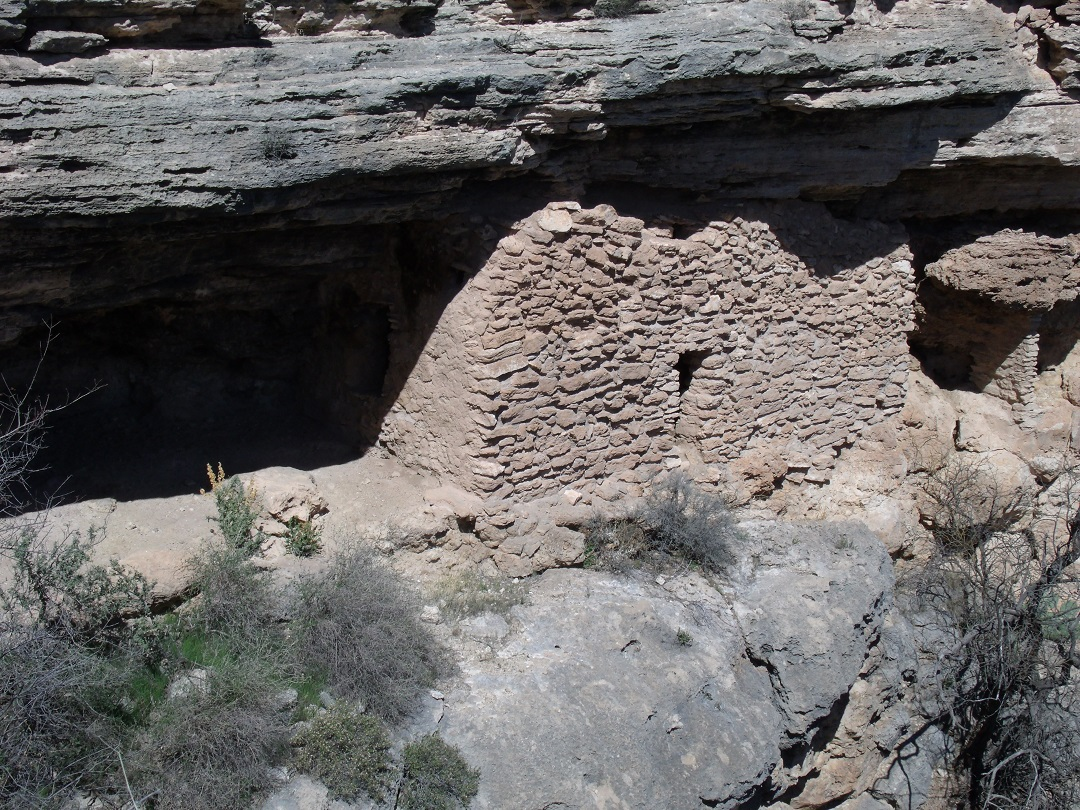
Close up view of the Cliff dwellings.

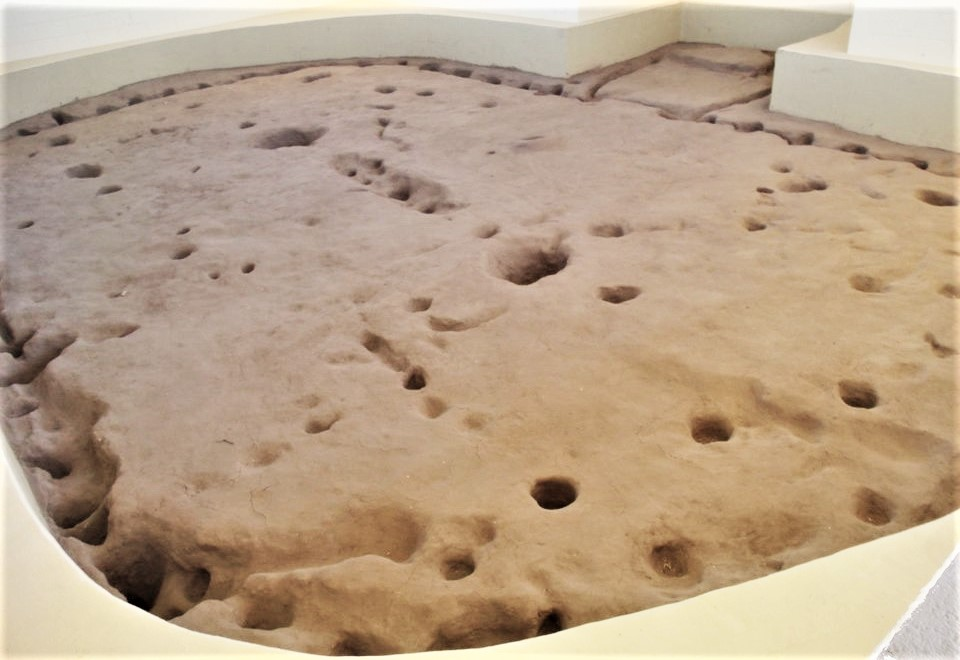
Sinagua Pit-house ruins.

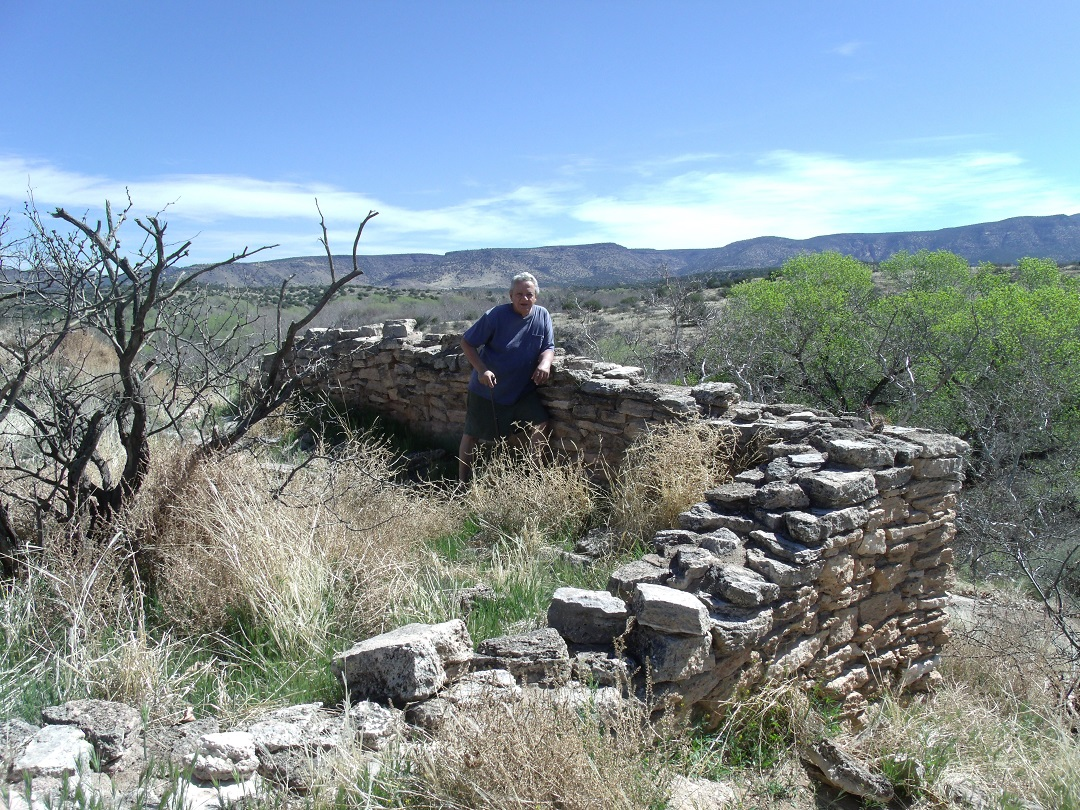
Ruins of a Sinagua House.

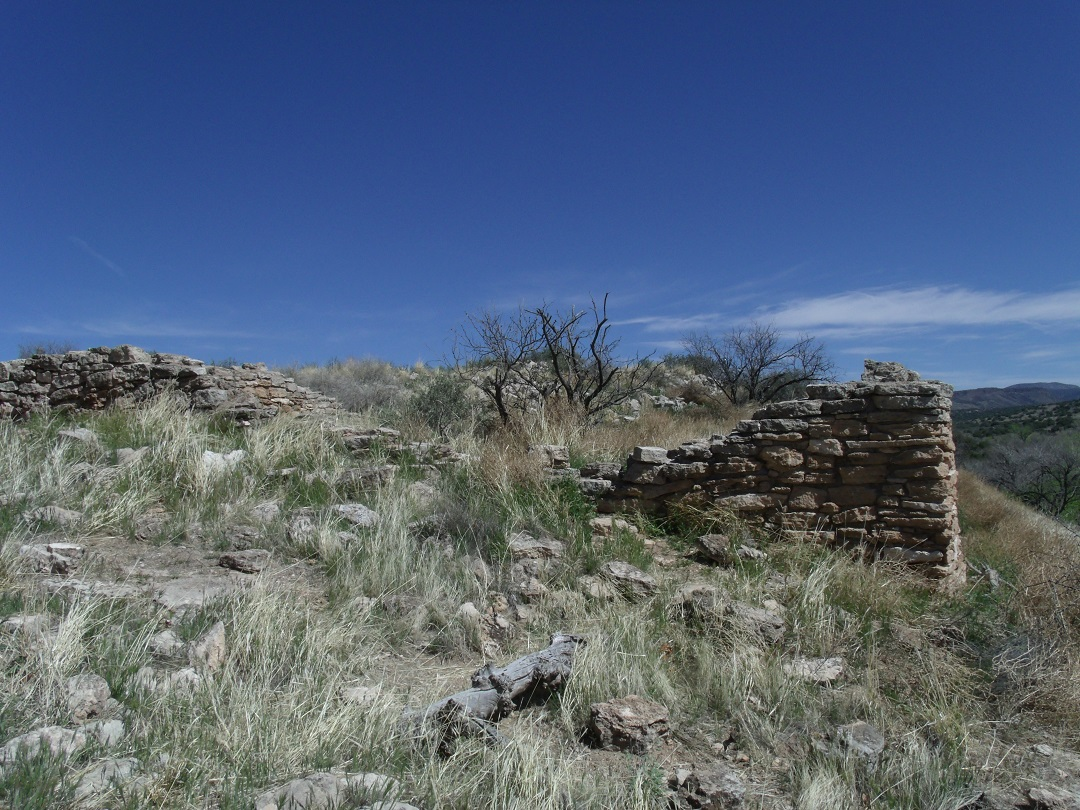
Different view of the ruins.

== See also ==
- National Register of Historic Places listings in Yavapai County, Arizona
- Camp Verde travel guide from Wikivoyage
