= UVX =

UVX may refer to:

- United Verde Extension, a copper mine in Arizona
- Utah Valley Express, a bus rapid transit route in Utah
- UVX Mining Co., an American mining company
