= UVX Mining Co. =

Historic mining operation in Arizona

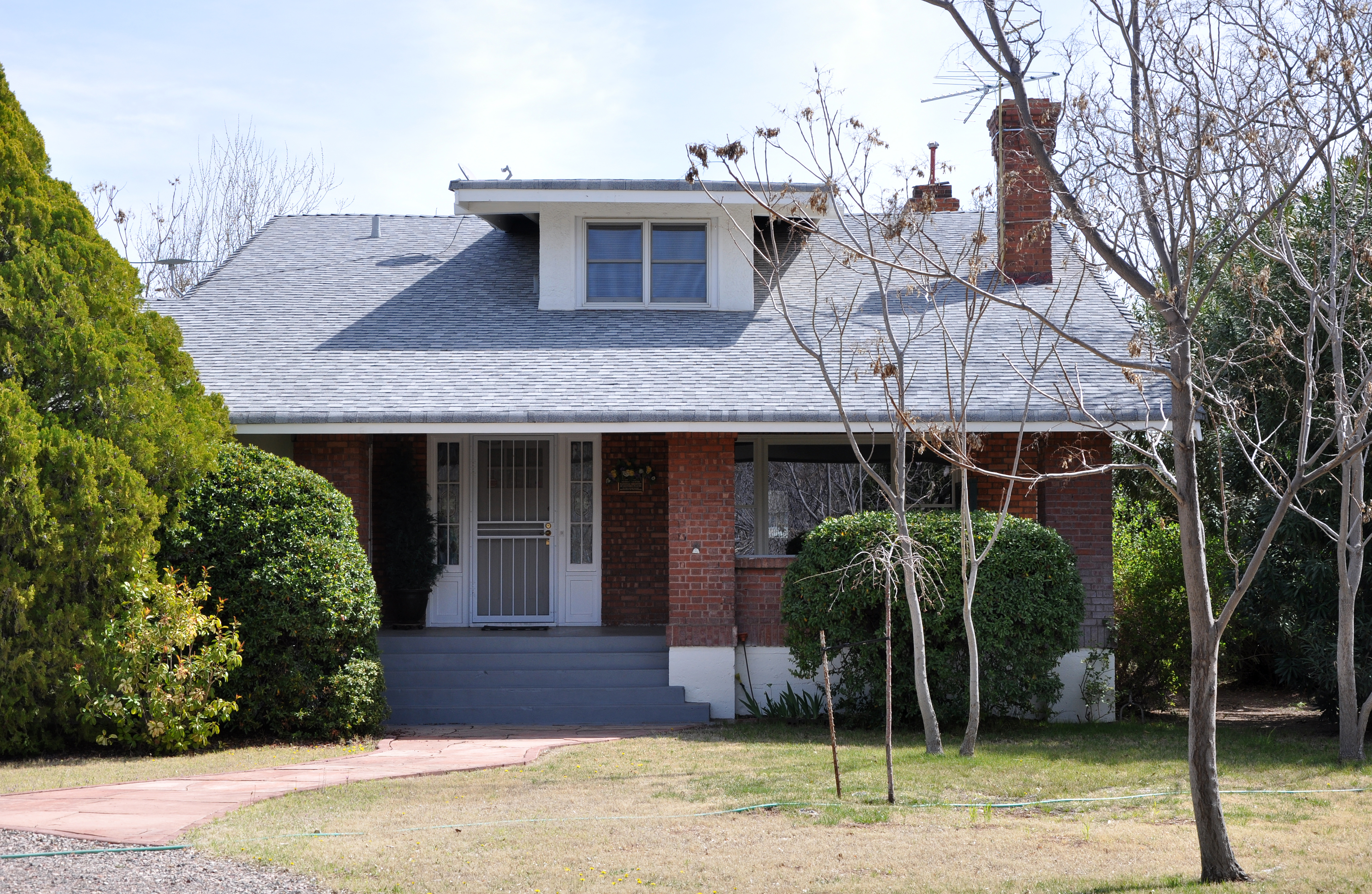
Master Mechanic's House in 2013

The UVX Mining Co., owned by James S. Douglas, Jr., operated the United Verde Extension (UVX) Mine at Jerome and built a copper smelter complex at Clemenceau (Cottonwood) in the U.S. state of Arizona. The complex, operational from 1917 through 1937, is listed on the National Register of Historic Places.

Specific buildings in the complex include:

- Clemenceau Public School, 1 N. Willard St., Cottonwood, Arizona (UVX Mining Co.), NRHP-listed Built by UVX in 1924 in Spanish Colonial style for children in grades 1 through 9.
- Master Mechanic's House, 333 S. Willard St., Cottonwood, Arizona (UVX Mining Co.), NRHP-listed Built in the Craftsman bungalow style with a variegated brick exterior.
- Smelter Machine Shop, 360 S. Sixth St., Cottonwood, Arizona (UVX Mining Co.), NRHP-listed A two-story, variegated brick structure with a gable roof.
- Superintendent's Residence, 315 S. Willard, Cottonwood, Arizona (UVX Mining Co.), NRHP-listed Built in the Craftsman bungalow style with a front veranda, gable roof, and central dormer. One of its later owners was John Garrett, a pharmacist and, in 1960, the first mayor of Cottonwood. This building now serves as the Cottonwood wine tasting room for Pillsbury Wine Company of Willcox, Arizona.
- UVX Smelter Operations Complex, 361 S. Willard, Cottonwood, Arizona (UVX Mining Co.), NRHP-listed Many original smelter structures, including the smokestack, have been demolished. Buildings sandblasted but remaining generally intact in 1986 included four one-story structures in panelled brick style– the Company Operations Office, the Changing Room, the Timekeeper's Office, and a clinic. After the smelter closed, all were used for social services. The Command Operations Office featured a wrap-around veranda and a parapet wall.

== See also ==
- National Register of Historic Places listings in Yavapai County, Arizona
