= Woolsey Ranchhouse Ruins =

- U.S. National Register of Historic Places
- Location within Arizona Location within the United States
- Location: North of Humboldt, Arizona off State Route 69
- Nearest city: Humboldt, Arizona
- Coordinates: 34°30′43″N 112°13′52″W
- Area: 0.8 acres (0.32 ha)
- Built: 1863
- NRHP reference No.: 77000240
- Added to NRHP: November 7, 1977

The Woolsey Ranchhouse Ruins, located north of Humboldt, Arizona off State Route 69, is a historic site with significance dating to 1863. It is a remnant of King Woolsey's ranch and is listed on the National Register of Historic Places.

A 0.8-acre (0.32 ha) area including the ruins was listed on the National Register in 1977.
