= Clear Creek Church =

Historic church in Arizona, United States

- U.S. National Register of Historic Places
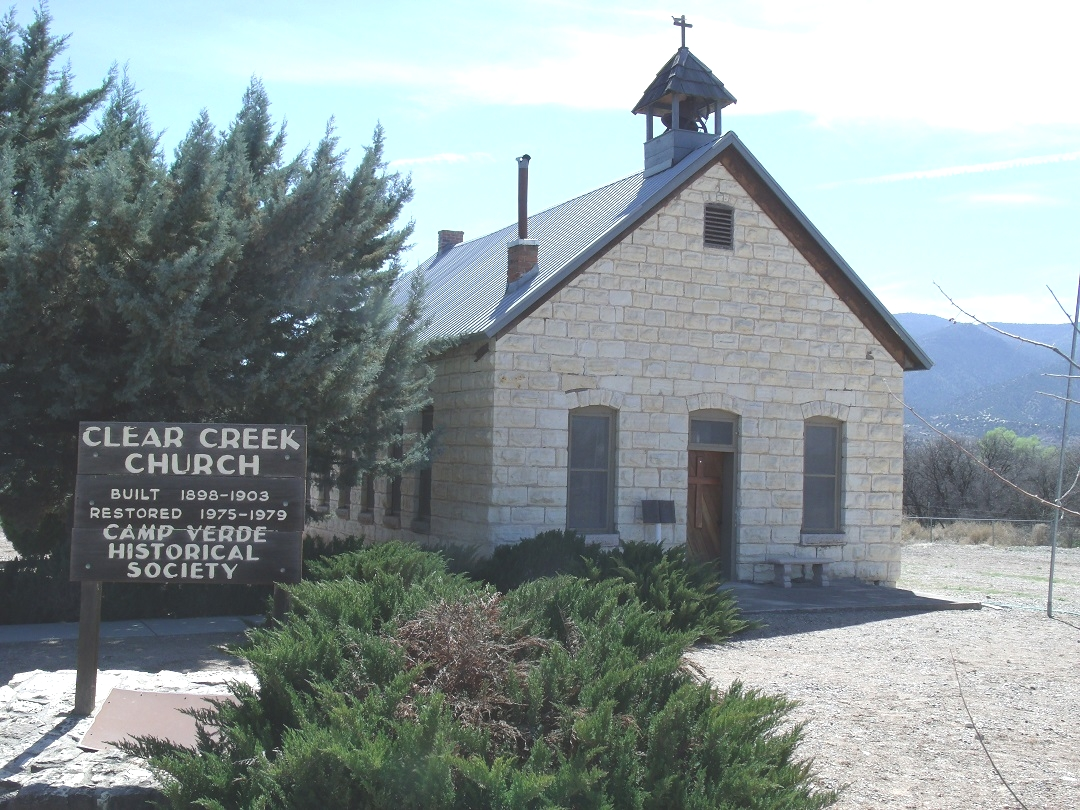
- Clear Creek Church

- Location within Arizona Location within the United States
- Nearest city: Camp Verde, Arizona
- Coordinates: 34°31′30″N 111°49′41″W
- Area: 0.3 acres (0.12 ha)
- Built: 1898–1903
- NRHP reference No.: 75000362
- Added to NRHP: August 6, 1975

The Clear Creek Church was built between 1898 and 1903 and is located on Clear Creek Road 3.5 miles (5.6 km) southeast of Camp Verde, Arizona. It was listed in the National Register of Historic Places in 1975.

It was built of limestone blocks taken from Hayfield wash on the Middle Verde River. Blocks ranged from 10 by 13 inches (0.25 m × 0.33 m) to 12 by 18 inches (0.30 m × 0.46 m) in size. It is 40 by 25 feet (12.2 m × 7.6 m) in plan. It has a high gable roof.

The builders placed in the cornerstone of the building a bible and a $5 gold piece (which was chiseled away in the 1920s). It was Camp Verde's only church until 1913, when it was transformed into the city's one-room schoolhouse. In 1946, the church was abandoned. Later the Clear Creek Church was looked after by the Camp Verde Historical Society.
