= Sacred Mountain (Arizona) =

Mountain in Arizona

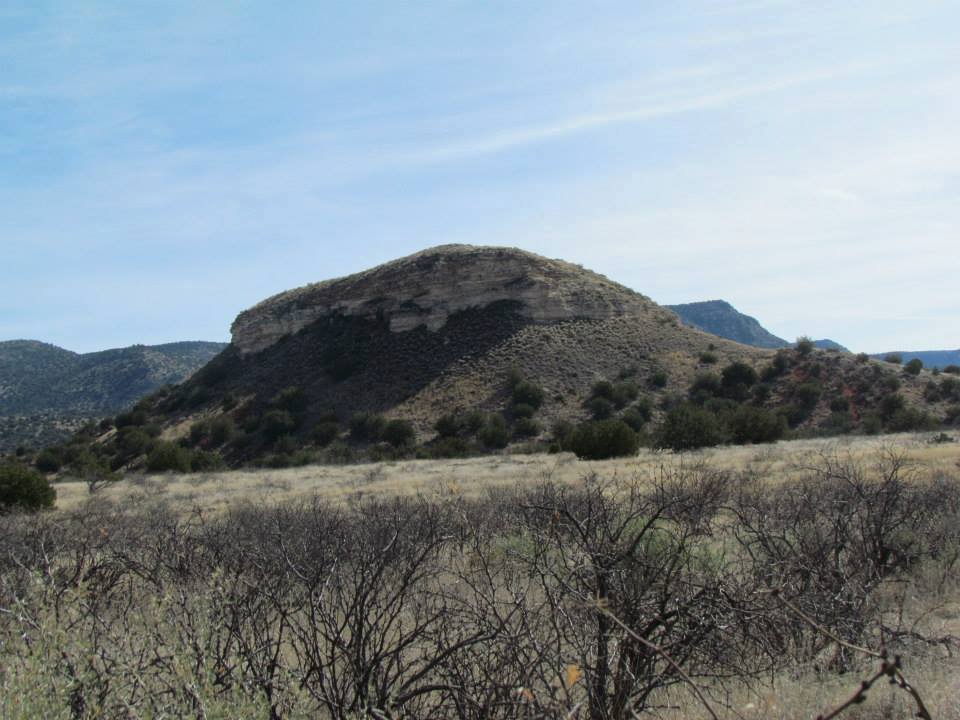
- The mountain from the north, in 2015

Highest point
- Elevation: 1,258 ft (383 m)
- Coordinates: 34.6575°N 111.7079°W

Geography
- Location within Arizona Location within the United States
- Sacred Mountain
- U.S. National Register of Historic Places
- Nearest city: Rimrock, Arizona
- NRHP reference No.: 75000366
- Added to NRHP: March 4, 1975

Sacred Mountain is a small mountain in Yavapai County, Arizona near the community of Lake Montezuma. It was added to the National Register of Historic Places on March 4, 1975. The mountain is significant for the agricultural remains and pueblos that can be found on it.

== Archaeology ==
A study of the surrounding basin by the University of Arizona revealed evidence that farming techniques such as check dams and raised-bed gardening were used. Many extensive canals were also found. Some cultivated agaves were found on the mountain itself.

The mountain also contains the remains of a large pueblo with 50 to 60 rooms. The pueblo is broken up into 3 blocks of around 20 rooms each. It also has a Hohokam ball court, the last identified court to be constructed in Verde Valley. The court has been largely eroded, however.

== See also ==
- V Bar V Heritage Site
