= Master Mechanic's House =

- U.S. National Register of Historic Places
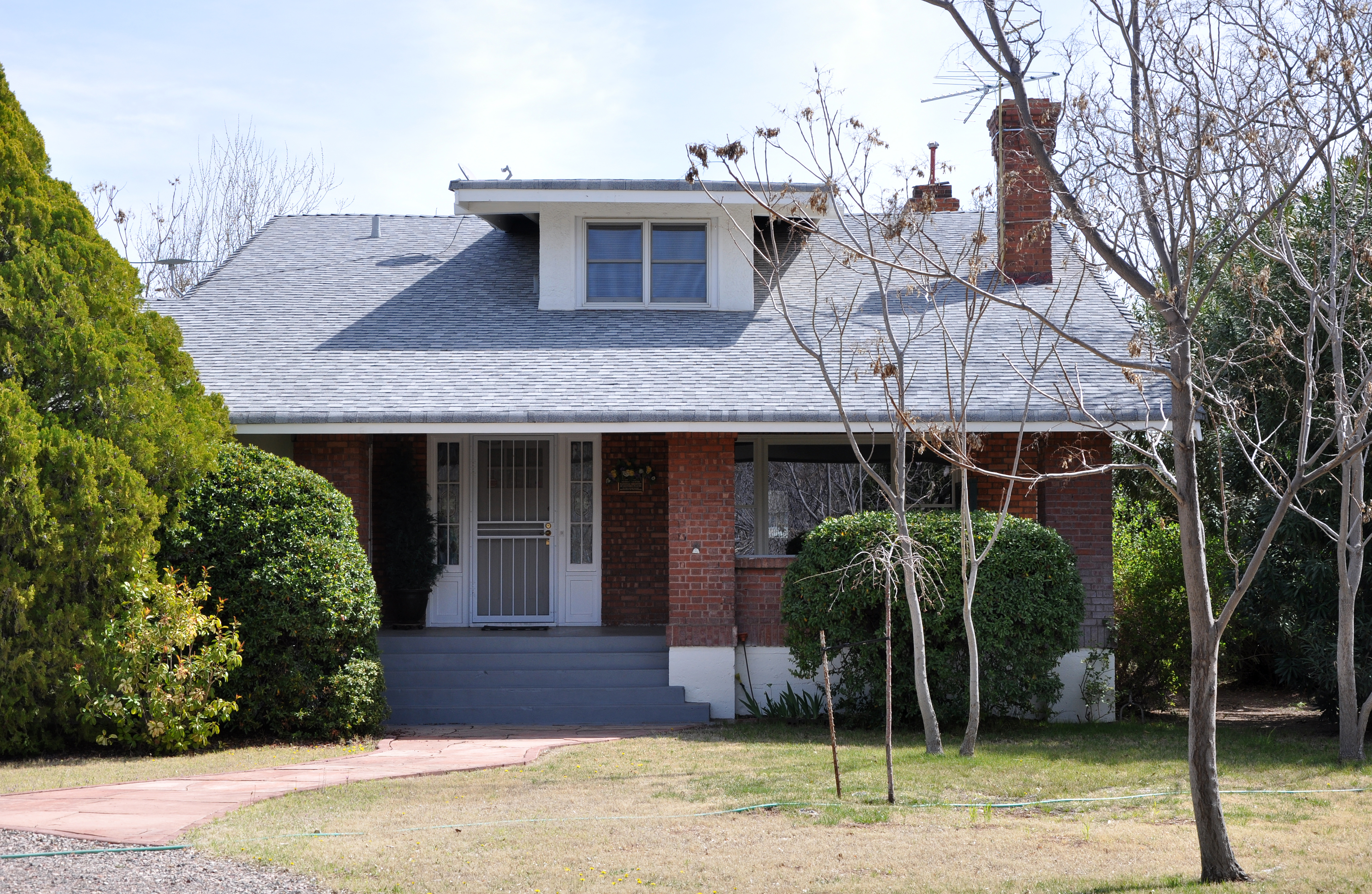

- Location within Arizona Location within the United States
- Location: 333 S. Willard St., Cottonwood, Arizona
- Coordinates: 34°44′00″N 112°01′33″W
- Area: 1 acre (0.40 ha)
- Built: 1918
- Built by: UVX Mining Co.
- Architectural style: Bungalow/craftsman
- MPS: Cottonwood MRA
- NRHP reference No.: 86002152
- Added to NRHP: September 19, 1986

The Master Mechanic's House, at 333 S. Willard St. in Cottonwood, Arizona, was built in 1918. It was listed on the National Register of Historic Places in 1986.

It is related to the UVX smelter complex on Willard.

It was deemed notable as "One of two local examples of the Craftsman Bungalow style and one of two extant residences constructed by the UVX mining company to house supervisory personnel."
