= Little Daisy Hotel =

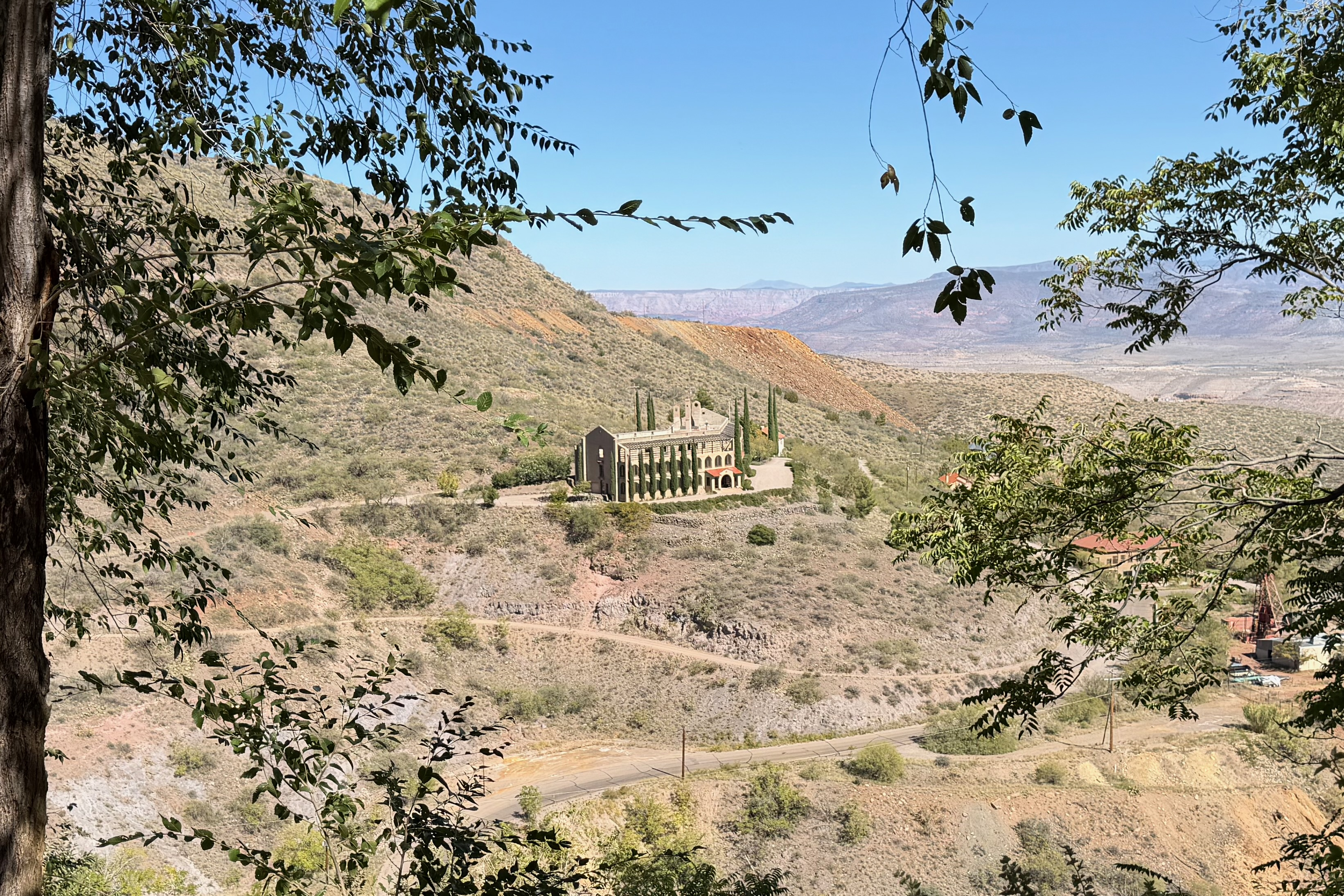
- Viewed from downtown Jerome in 2025
- Interactive map of the Little Daisy Hotel area

General information
- Type: Private mansion
- Architectural style: Spanish Colonial Revival
- Location: Jerome, Arizona 86331, 300 Upper Bell Road
- Coordinates: 34.754525°N 112.114341°W
- Completed: 1918
- Opened: January 1, 1919
- Renovated: 1995-2007
- Owner: Grooms Family

Technical details
- Floor area: 12,398 sq ft
- Grounds: 27,000 ft

Design and construction
- Architects: Royal Lescher and Leslie J. Mahoney

Website
- www.thelittledaisyjerome.com

Little Daisy Hotel is a 12,398-square foot hotel located on 3.45 acres of land in Jerome, Arizona. It is best known for having been originally built as lodging to serve miners working in the Little Daisy mine beginning in 1918 before being converted to a private residence.

== History ==
The property on which Little Daisy Hotel is situated was purchased in 1916 by Jimmy "Rawhide" Douglas, the son of a Canadian mining engineer and executive who had passed through Arizona en route to Mexico in 1912. Douglas sought to become an early prospector in Jerome's local copper deposits and created the United Verde Extension (UVX) mining company.

In 1916, Douglas commissioned local architects Royal Lescher and Leslie J. Mahoney to design the structure that would later be known as Little Daisy Hotel, named for one of the copper mines in which Douglas's employees worked. The hotel opened in 1919 and primarily served the workers of the Little Daisy mine. After World War II and the decline of copper mining, Douglas closed the hotel in 1938 and began selling off furniture and other items. In 1953, he sold the property to William Earl Bell, the inventor of the atomic clock.

Bell resided in a smaller residence on the property and did not regularly caretake the Little Daisy building. As a result, the structure fell into disrepair and was frequently trespassed by tourists and curious locals. After Bell's death in 1991, his estate sold the Little Daisy Hotel to Walter and Lisa Acker in 1995.

The Ackers renovated the hotel over the subsequent 12 years, remodeling the interior and restoring the hotel to many of its original designs. During their tenure as owners they used the hotel as their private estate until selling the property to the Grooms family in 2020. As of 2023, ownership of the hotel remains in the Grooms family.

The hotel is a contributing property to the Jerome Historic District, a National Historic Landmark.
