= Jerome Grand Hotel =

- U.S. Historic district – Contributing property
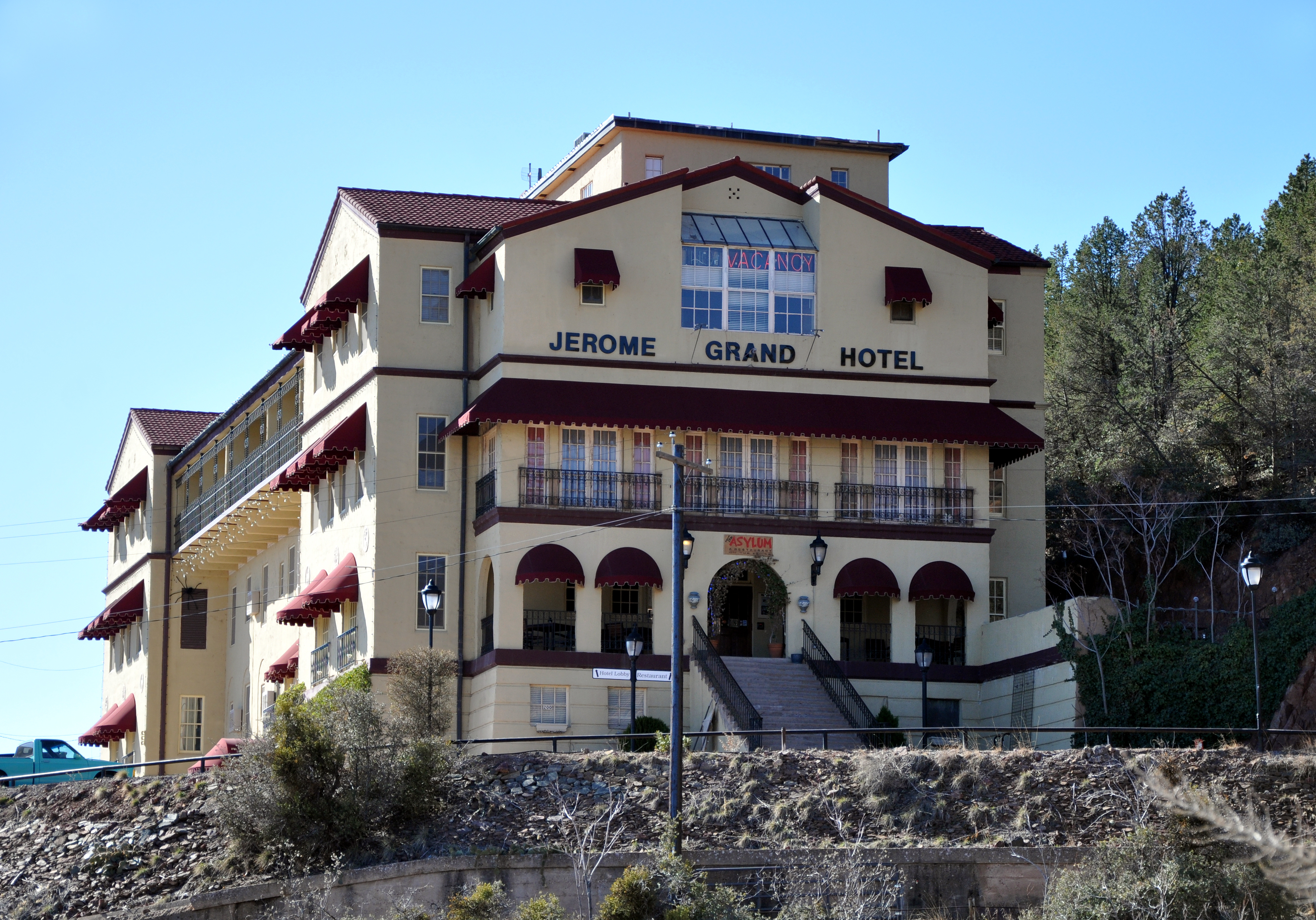

- Location within Arizona Location within the United States
- Location: Jerome, Arizona
- Coordinates: 34°45′13″N 112°6′41″W
- Part of: Jerome Historic District (ID66000196)
- Added to NRHP: November 13, 1966

The Jerome Grand Hotel is a historic hotel that is in use in Jerome, Arizona. The hotel's motto is "Arizona's mile high historic landmark".

== History ==
=== Founded as the United Verde Hospital ===
The Jerome Grand Hotel was originally constructed in 1926 under the name United Verde Hospital, owned by the United Verde Copper Company (UVCC), later to become Phelps Dodge Mining Corporation. Some knew it as the Phelps Dodge Hospital and United Verde Copper Hospital. It was the 4th and final hospital in Jerome. Opened in January 1927, the United Verde Hospital was a state-of-the-art medical facility; in 1930, listed as the most modern and well equipped hospital in Arizona and possibly in all of the western states. The hospital, however, was closed in 1950, as the mining operations began shutting down and medical services were available in the neighboring community of Cottonwood, where many of the staff transferred to. The building stood unused for the next 44 years.

=== As the Jerome Grand Hotel ===
The former hospital was purchased by Larry Altherr from Phelps Dodge Mining Corporation in 1994, and was renamed the Jerome Grand Hotel, opening for business in 1996. Larry Altherr remains the owner.

== Structure ==
The Jerome Grand Hotel is well noted to be the highest commercial building in the Verde Valley, being at a height of 5240 feet above sea level. The hotel was built as a Mission Revival Style of architecture and was the last major building to be constructed in Jerome. The building was considered by many a masterpiece of architecture because, not only was it constructed of poured-in-place concrete, but also at a 50 degree slope on solid bedrock, up against the slopes of Mingus Mountain. The 30,000 square foot building was designed to be fireproof-not one piece of wood is in the framework-and also earthquake proof, as it needed to withstand not only the rumblings of Mother Nature but also the blasts of 260,000 pounds of dynamite.

== The Otis Elevator ==
The Otis Elevator, which was Arizona's first self-service elevator, was installed in the United Verde Hospital in 1926 and serves all five levels of the building. The elevator is regularly maintained and inspected, insuring safety for public use. This Otis elevator is different from modern elevators because, designed for hospital use, it travels much more slowly, at a distance of only 50 feet per minute, rather than the normal 800 feet per minute found on high rise buildings. The Otis elevator is narrow and deep, designed for hospital equipment, such as gurneys and wheelchairs.

== The Kewanee Boiler ==
The cast iron Kewanee Boiler, which was also installed in 1926, provides low pressure steam throughout the building. The Kewanee boiler, designed to not only be portable but also convertible, could operate on wood, coal or oil. When in use during the hospital days, the source was oil and has since been converted to operate using natural gas, producing between 800,000 and 2,500,000 BTUs. The Kewanee Boiler also utilizes a dual pump feature, so it need not be shut off for maintenance nor repair, insuring consistent pressure and warmth throughout the building. <owner>

== See also ==
- List of historic properties in Jerome, Arizona
