= Jerome Historic District =

Historic district in Arizona, United States

- U.S. National Register of Historic Places
- U.S. National Historic Landmark District
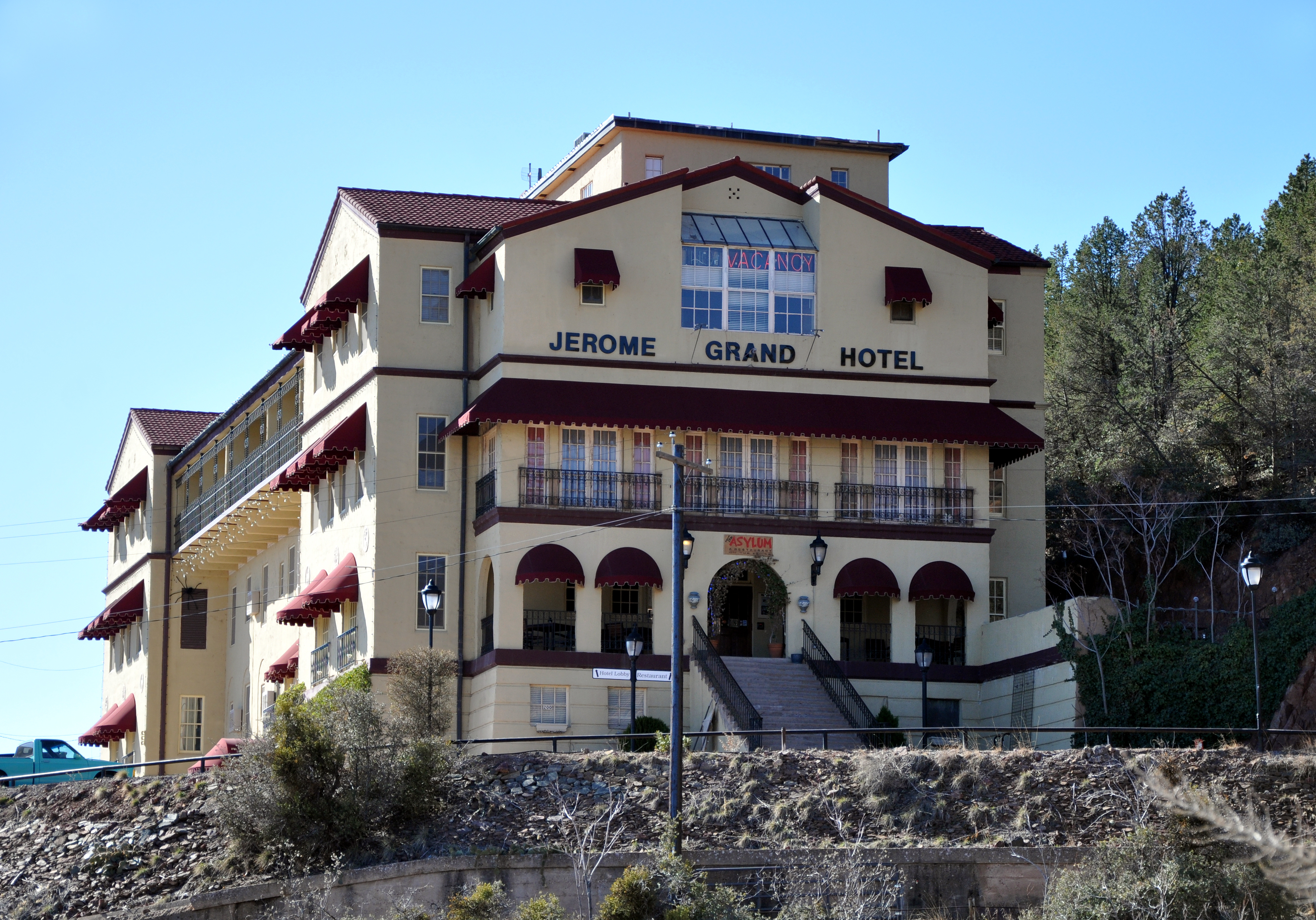
- Jerome Grand Hotel

- Location within Arizona Location within the United States
- Location: Jerome, Arizona
- Coordinates: 34°45′13″N 112°6′41″W
- Area: 120 acres (49 ha)
- Built: 1876
- NRHP reference No.: 66000196

Significant dates
- Added to NRHP: November 13, 1966
- Designated NHLD: November 13, 1966

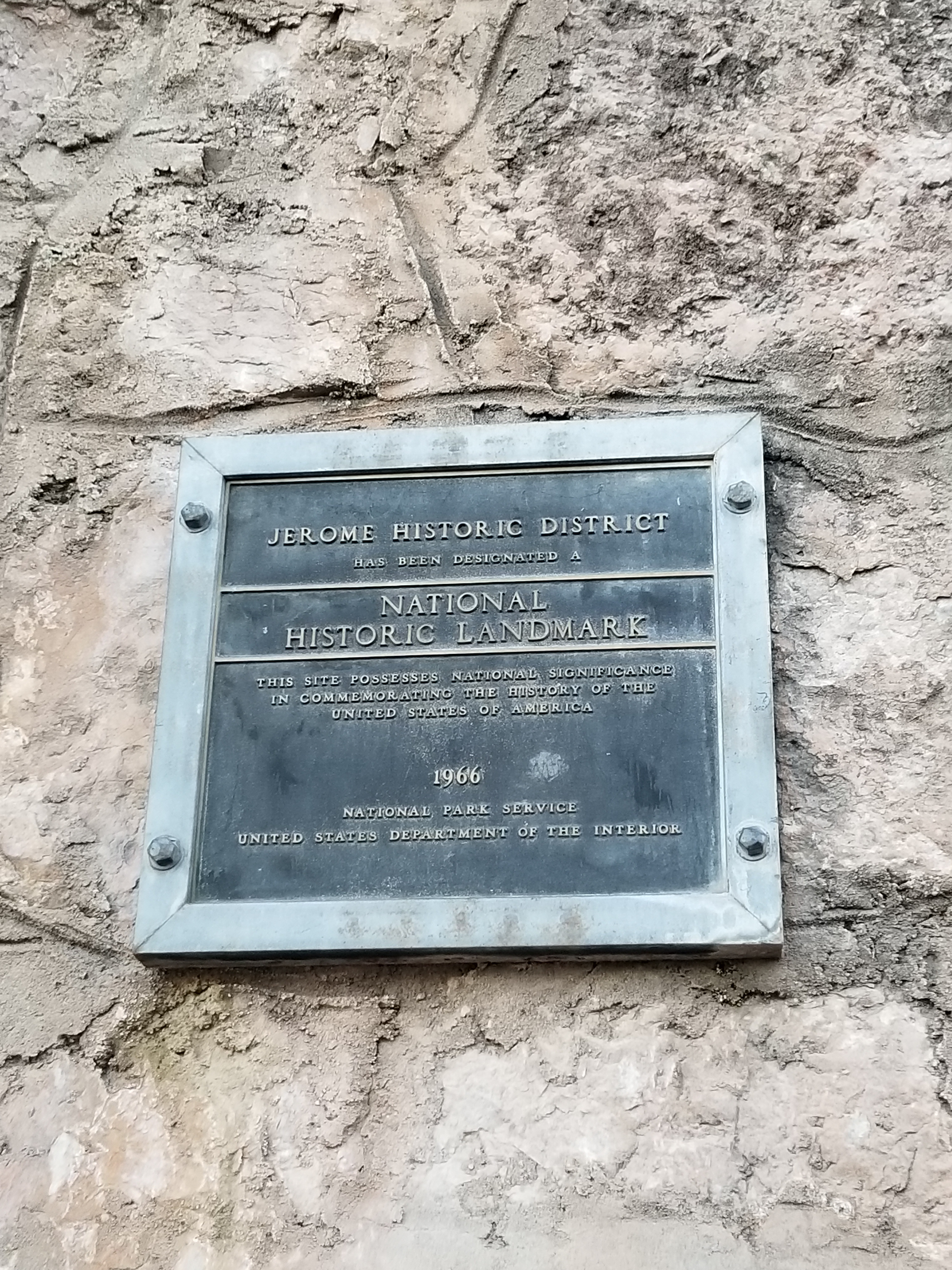

The Jerome Historic District is a National Historic Landmark District encompassing the former mining community of Jerome, Arizona. The town was founded as a mining camp associated with copper deposits that were mined from the late 19th century until 1953. The district was declared a National Historic Landmark in 1966 and was included into the then-new National Register of Historic Places.

== Historic district ==
Jerome is a town in the Black Hills of Yavapai County, Arizona. It was founded in the late 19th century on Cleopatra Hill overlooking the Verde Valley to take advantage of copper deposits discovered in the 1870s whose extraction was made profitable by the arrival of a railroad spur nearby. The community reached its peak in the early 20th-century, and declined as its principal ore lodes were exhausted after World War II; the mines were closed for good in 1953. The historic district encompasses most of the built area within the town's municipal limits, as well as mining-related resources outside those limits, and the Douglas Mansion, the centerpiece of Jerome State Historic Park. The community retains much of the look and feel of an early 20th-century mining town, with buildings perched along the winding roads of the steeply sloped mountainside. In addition to houses, commercial and civic buildings survive, as does a late 19th-century copper smelter.

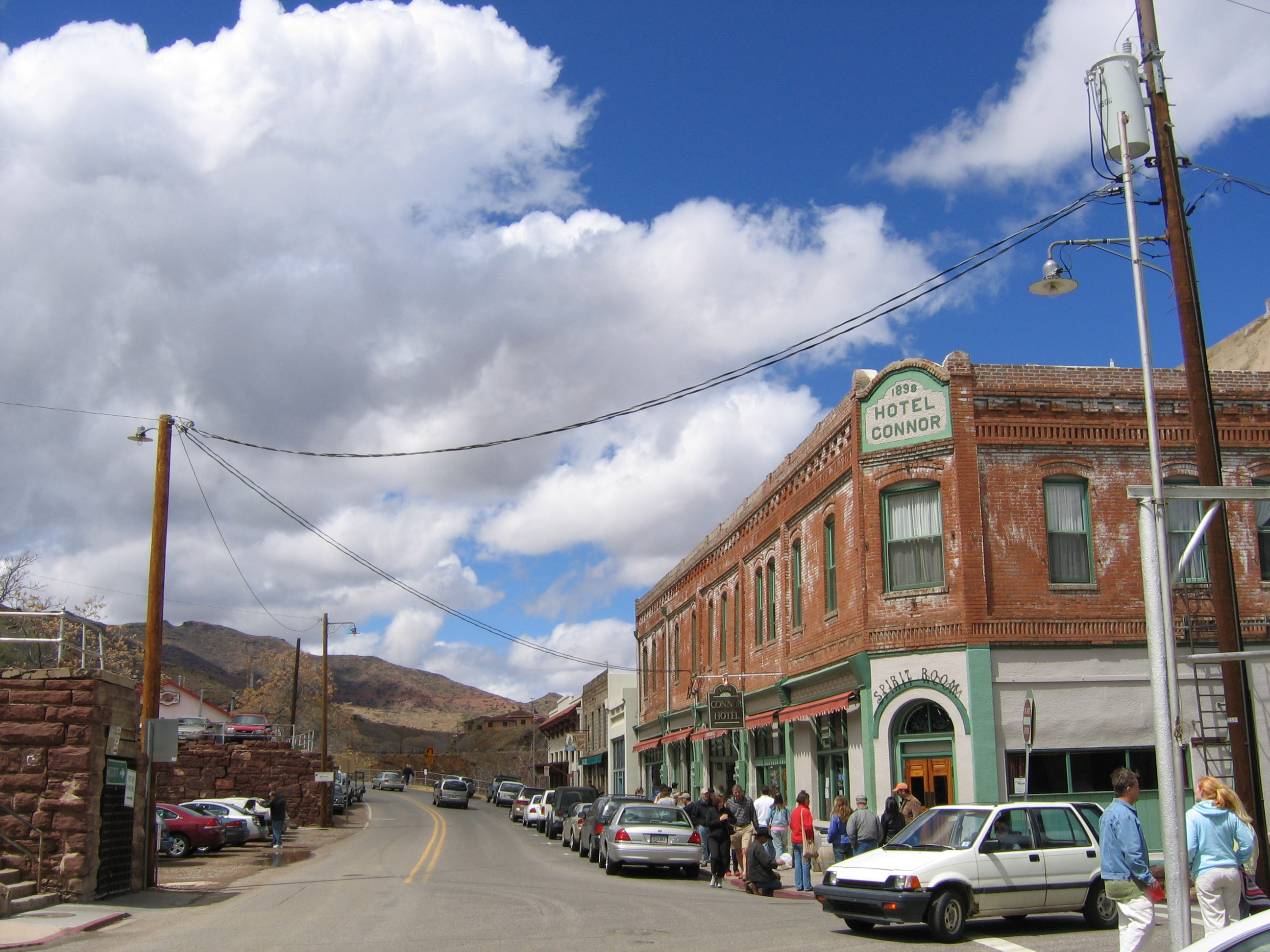
View of Jerome Historic District, looking west up Main Street towards the mine, 2006.

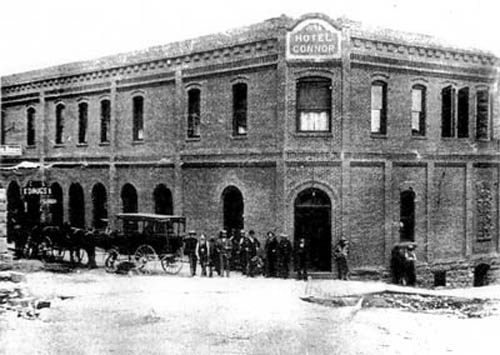
The Connor hotel in 1899.

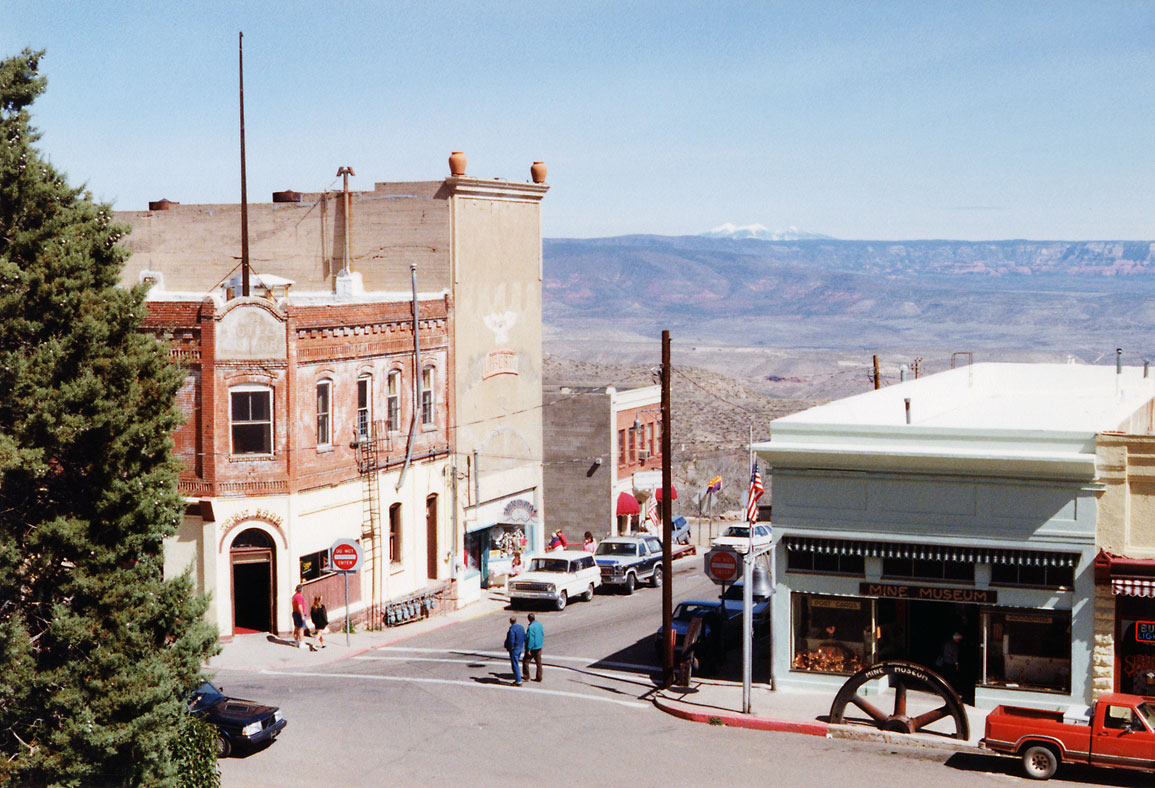
Main Street and Jerome Avenue: the Connor Hotel (left side corner) and the Liberty Theater

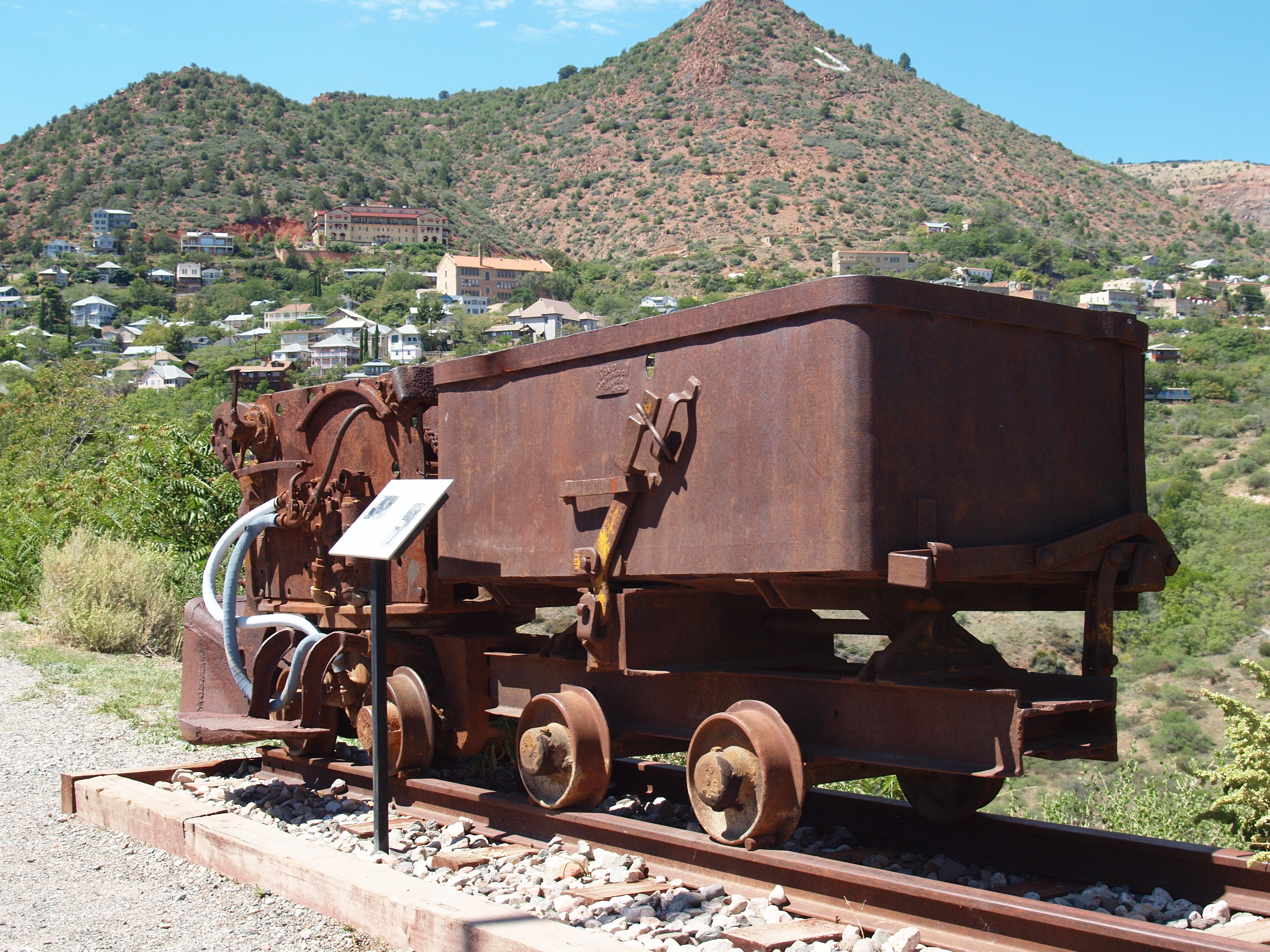
Mining car

== Jerome Historical Society ==
The Jerome Historical Society was founded in 1953 and is located at 407 Clark Street, within the district. In 1956 the society completed negotiations with Phelps Dodge assuring that no more buildings would be torn down in the main part of Jerome. The aim of the society is to "protect, preserve and present the unique physical and natural history of Jerome…for the benefit of residents and current and future generations.” The society maintains a variety of buildings, museums and special projects in and around Jerome.

== Historic properties ==
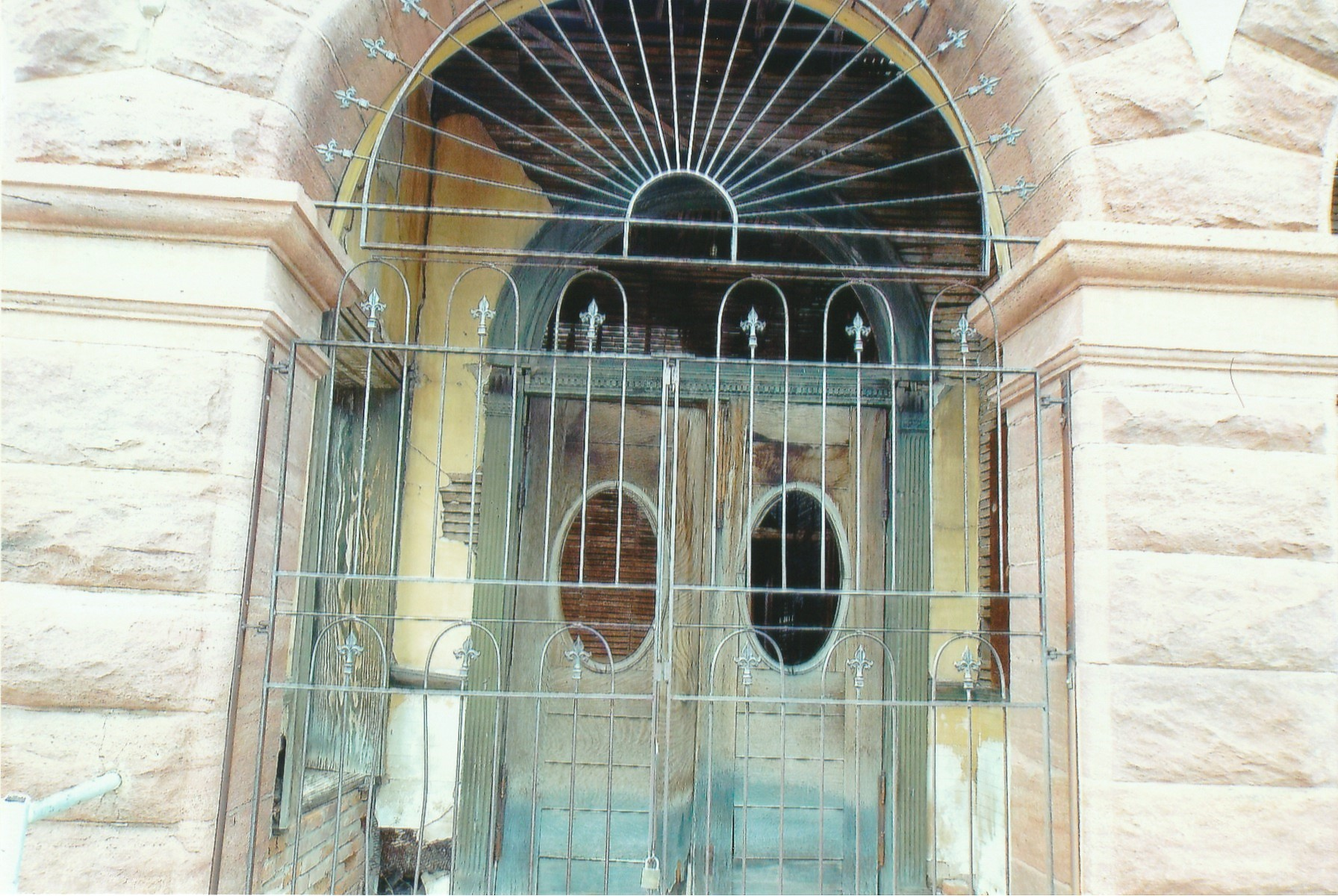
One entrance of the Barlett Hotel.

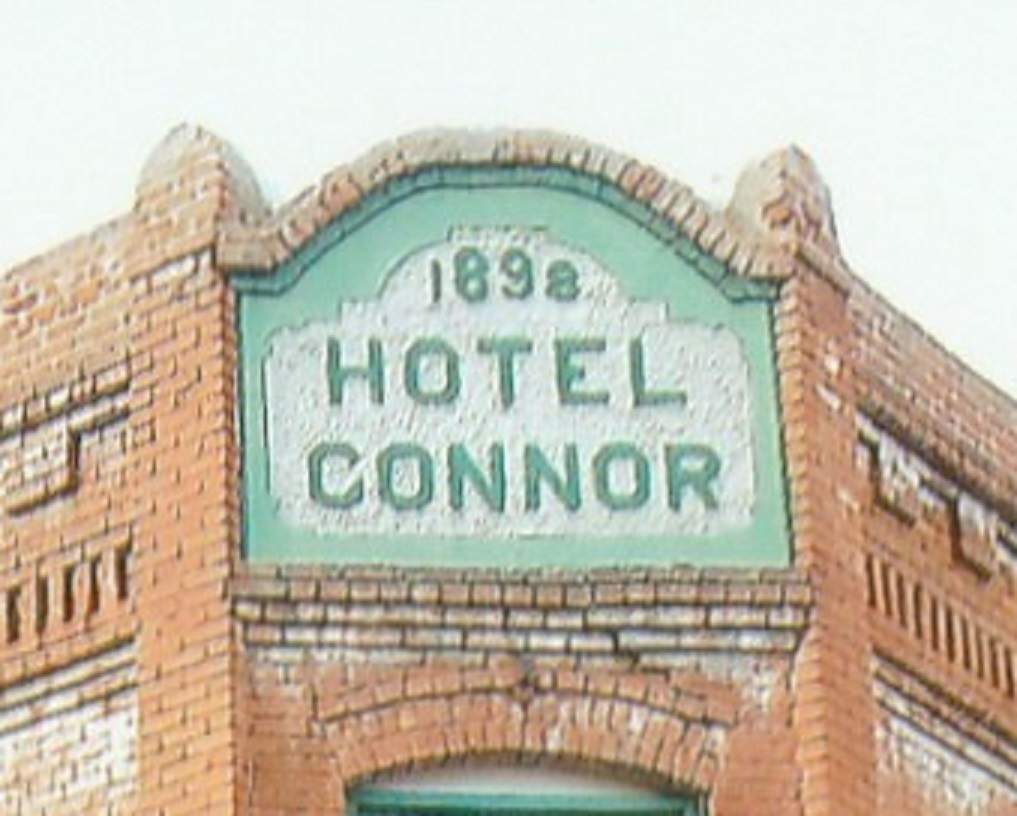
The Hotel Connor.

Numerous properties within the district are historical, though others are not. Structures identified as historical by the Jerome Historical Society Plaque Project have a mounted plaque, placed by the society. The historic properties include:

== See also ==
- Jerome Grand Hotel
- Jerome State Historic Park
- UVX Mining Co.
- List of National Historic Landmarks in Arizona
- National Register of Historic Places listings in Yavapai County, Arizona
