= William A. Clark House =

Demolished mansion in Manhattan, New York

Coordinates: 40°46′30.8″N 73°57′52.8″W

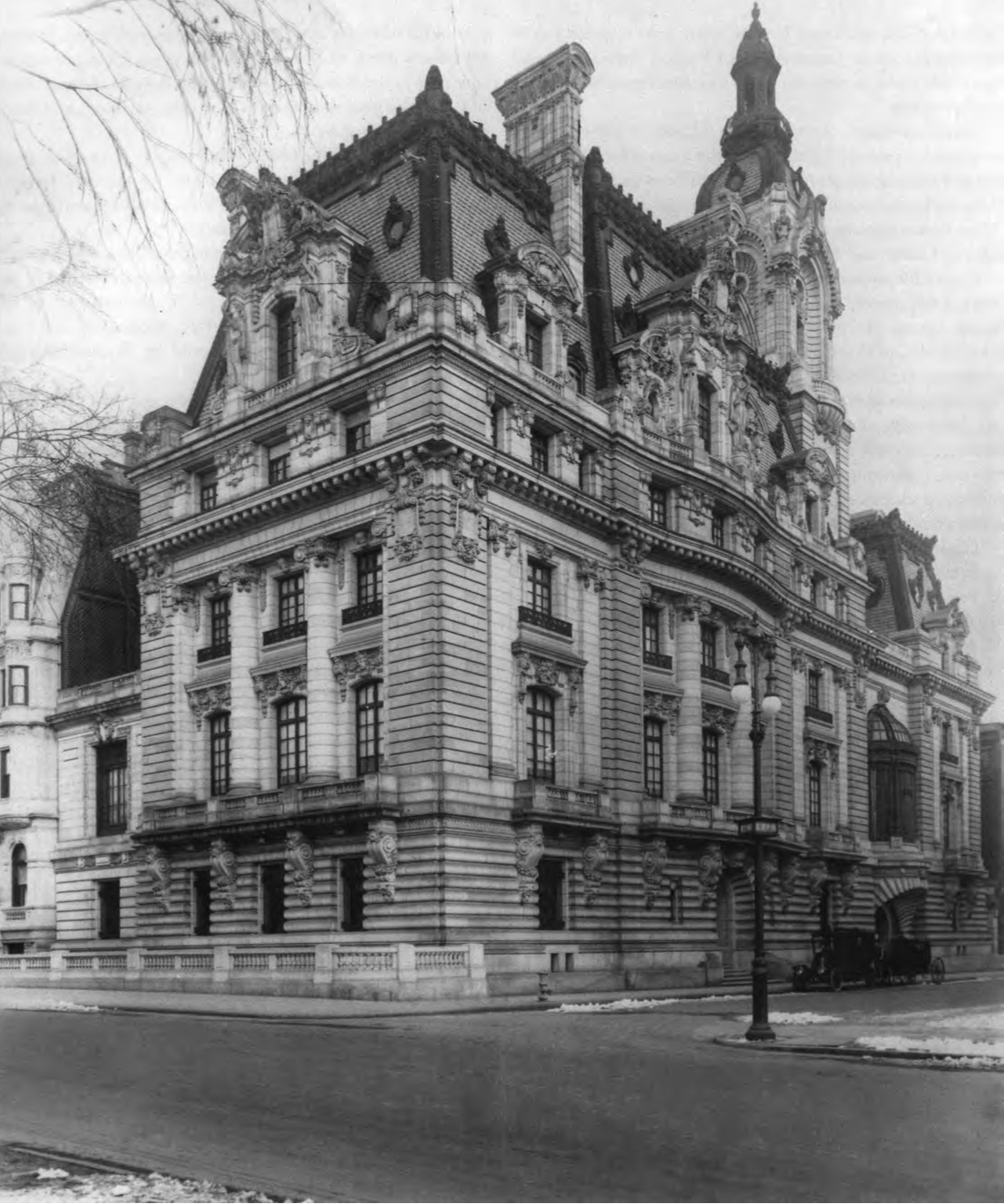
- Main frontage along East 77th Street

General information
- Status: Demolished
- Type: Residence
- Architectural style: Beaux-Arts Châteauesque
- Location: Manhattan, New York, United States, 962 Fifth Avenue
- Construction started: 1897
- Completed: 1911
- Demolished: 1927
- Cost: $7 million (equivalent to $241,875,000 in 2025)
- Client: William A. Clark

Design and construction
- Architects: Austin W. Lord; J. Monroe Hewlett; Washington Hull

The William A. Clark House, nicknamed "Clark's Folly", was a mansion located at 962 Fifth Avenue on the northeast corner of its intersection with East 77th Street on the Upper East Side of Manhattan, New York City. It was demolished in 1927 and replaced with a luxury apartment building (960 Fifth Avenue).

== Construction ==
William A. Clark, a wealthy entrepreneur and politician from Montana, commissioned the New York City firm of Lord, Hewlett & Hull to build the mansion in 1897. It was completed in 1911, after numerous legal disputes, at a cost of $7 million (equivalent to $241,875,000 in 2025). The mansion contained 121 rooms, 31 baths, four art galleries, a swimming pool, a concealed garage, and a private underground rail line to bring in coal for heat.

Clark bought a quarry in New Hampshire, at a cost of $50,000 (equivalent to $1,728,000 in 2025), and built a railroad to transport the stone for the building. He also bought a bronze foundry employing 200 men to manufacture the bronze fittings. In addition, he imported marble from Italy, oak from Sherwood Forest in England, and parts of old French châteaux for the interior.

The building of the mansion is described in the bestselling biography of Clark's daughter, Huguette, and her family, Empty Mansions: The Mysterious Life of Huguette Clark and the Spending of a Great American Fortune by Bill Dedman and Paul Clark Newell, Jr.

== Architecture ==
=== Exterior ===
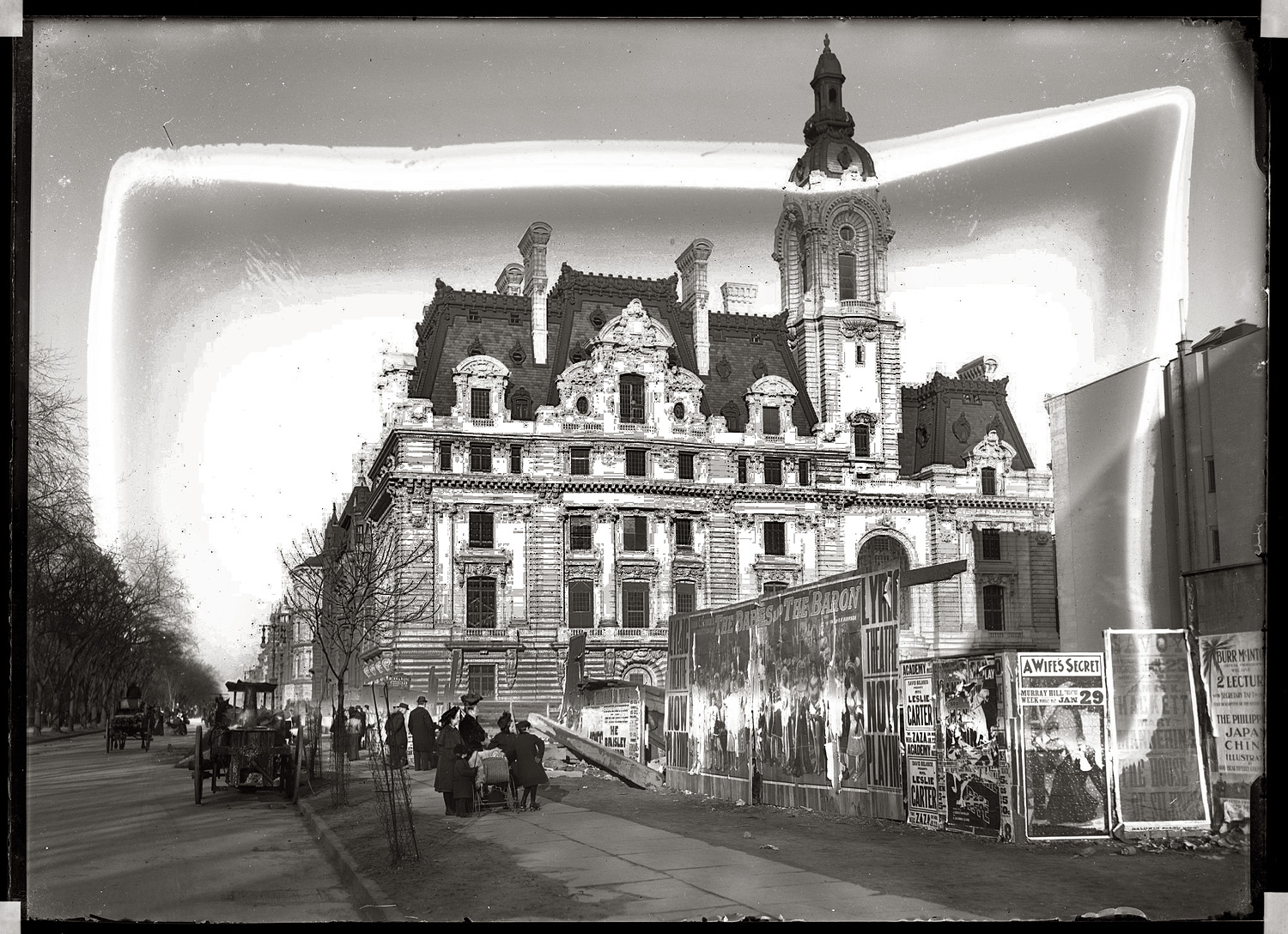
Fifth Avenue and 77th Street in New York City (winter 1905–1906)

The house took up 250 feet on 77th Street and 77 feet on Fifth Avenue, more than any other Gilded Age mansion on Fifth opposite the park, with the exception of the Andrew Carnegie Mansion. The Fifth Avenue frontage was large for a New York house, with three bays of granite.

On 77th Street, the house featured a long facade rising to a steep mansard roof. The mansion featured a spectacular four-sided tower with a three-story-high inward-curving arch topped by an open pergola that was said to have been visible from almost anywhere in Central Park.

=== Interior ===
The house rose nine stories, with Victorian Turkish baths below ground level, laundry rooms on the top floor and many Greek marble columns. There was a Numidian marble fireplace in the banquet room that measured 15 ft. across, with life-size figures of Diana and Neptune. The 121 rooms were filled with medieval tapestries and artwork. In the breakfast room, there were 170 carved panels, with no two being identical.

On the second floor was a rotunda, 36 feet high, of Maryland marble with eight Bresche violet marble columns, used as the statuary room. The room opened onto a conservatory of solid brass and glass, 30 feet high and 22 feet wide. Across the rotunda was the marble-paneled main picture gallery, which was 95 ft. long and two stories high. An organ loft housed the largest chamber organ in America. The Murray M. Harris organ, designed by Arthur Scott Brook, had four manuals (keyboards) and pedalboard, 74 ranks and 71 speaking stops.

The Salon Doré, an ornate 18th-century room taken from the Hotel de Clermont in Paris, was installed in the house and served as the receiving room.

There were 25 guest rooms with their own baths, and 35 servants' rooms, with men's quarters (to the east) and women's rooms (to the west). There was also a Gothic library that was 90 feet long, featuring a beamed ceiling and an immense carved fireplace.

Clark's art collection included works by Eugène Delacroix, Jean-François Millet, Jean-Baptiste-Camille Corot, John Constable, François Boucher and Charles-François Daubigny. It was reported that he spent $200,000 (equivalent to $6,911,000 in 2025) for the Gobelin tapestries owned by Prince Murat and $350,000 (equivalent to $12,094,000 in 2025) for those of the Earl of Coventry.

== Demolition ==
In 1925, upon Clark's death, his widow and his daughter, Huguette Clark, moved to 907 Fifth Avenue, where the annual rental for a full-floor apartment was about $30,000. Shortly thereafter, the mansion was sold to Anthony Campagna for $3 million (equivalent to $55,076,000 in 2025). He had the home torn down in 1927, less than 20 years after it was built. It was replaced with the current luxury apartment building at 960 Fifth Avenue. The Salon Doré was bequeathed to the Corcoran Gallery of Art in Washington, D.C.

== Critical reception ==
Montgomery Schuyler, in a column titled "Architectural Aberrations" in Architectural Record, stated that the house was "an appropriate residence for the late P. T. Barnum." He felt the tower was "meaningless and fatuous"; the rounded rustication on the first floor suggested the prototype of "a log house." At the time, the French style had gone out of fashion and the ornamentation was no longer in vogue. Schuyler wrote that "a certified check to the amount of all this stone carving hung on the outer wall would serve every artistic purpose attained by the carving itself."

The editor of The Architect called the mansion "The House of a Thousand Cartouches" and despised the "dolorous and ponderous granite" chosen. At the time, these opinions were widespread, earning it the nickname "Clark's Folly".

In 2011, however, The New York Times architectural critic Christopher Gray stated the house was, in fact, "a pretty neat house. If Carrère & Hastings had designed it for an establishment client, its profligacy would certainly have been forgiven, perhaps lionized."

== Gallery ==
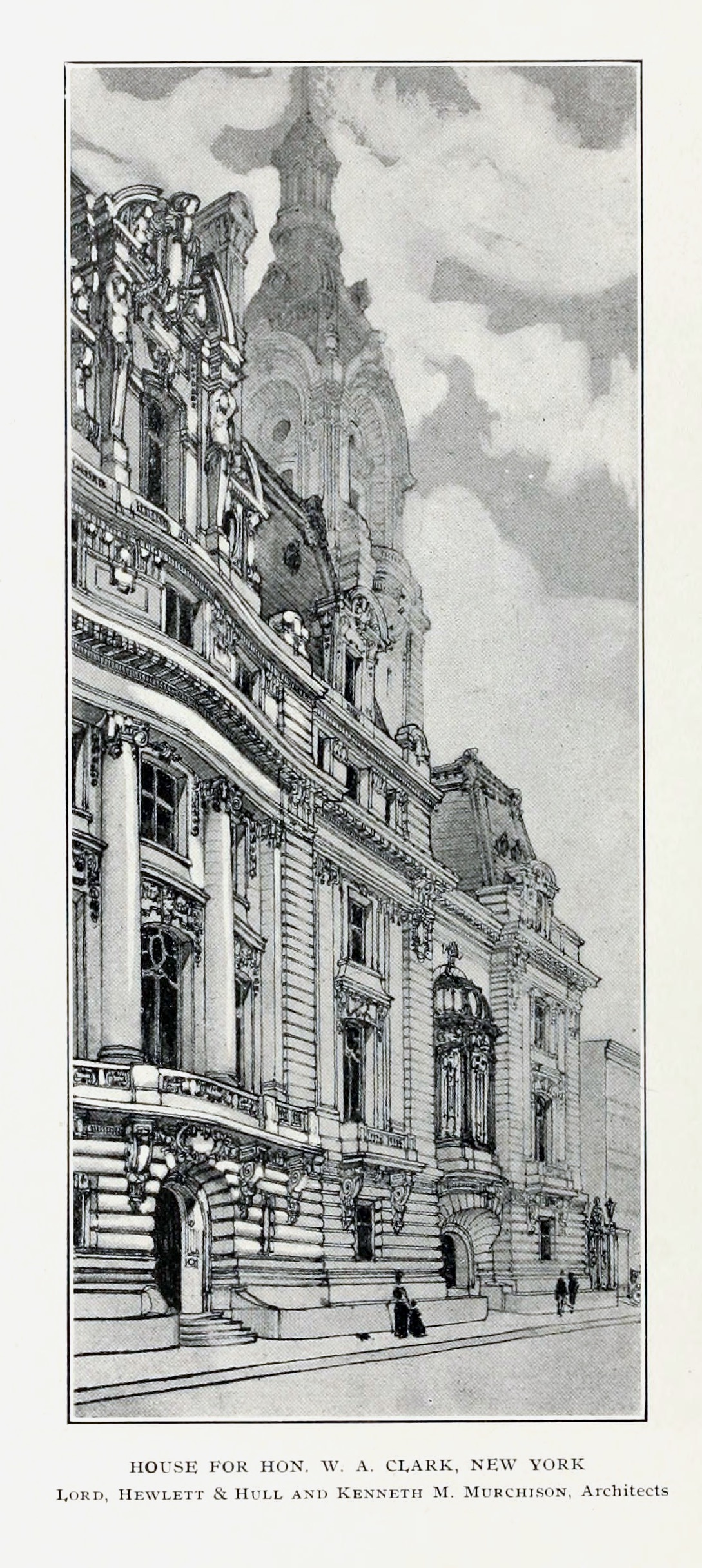
Perspective drawing

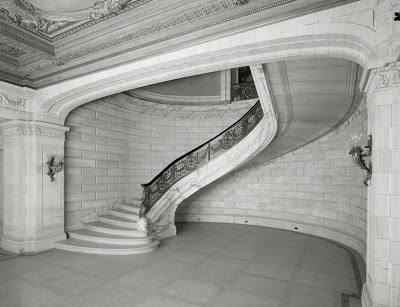
The Grand Staircase

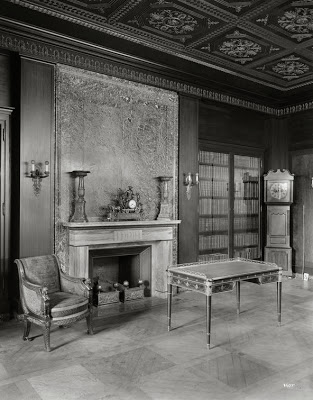
The Office Library

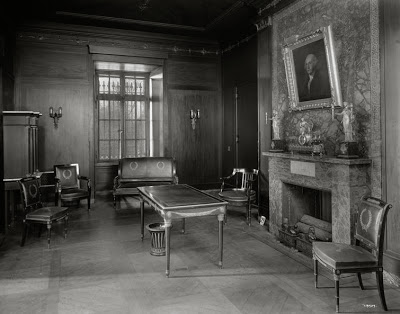
The Reception Room

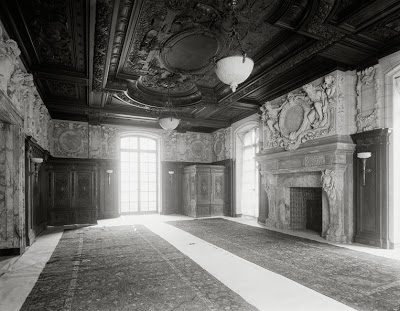
Dining Room

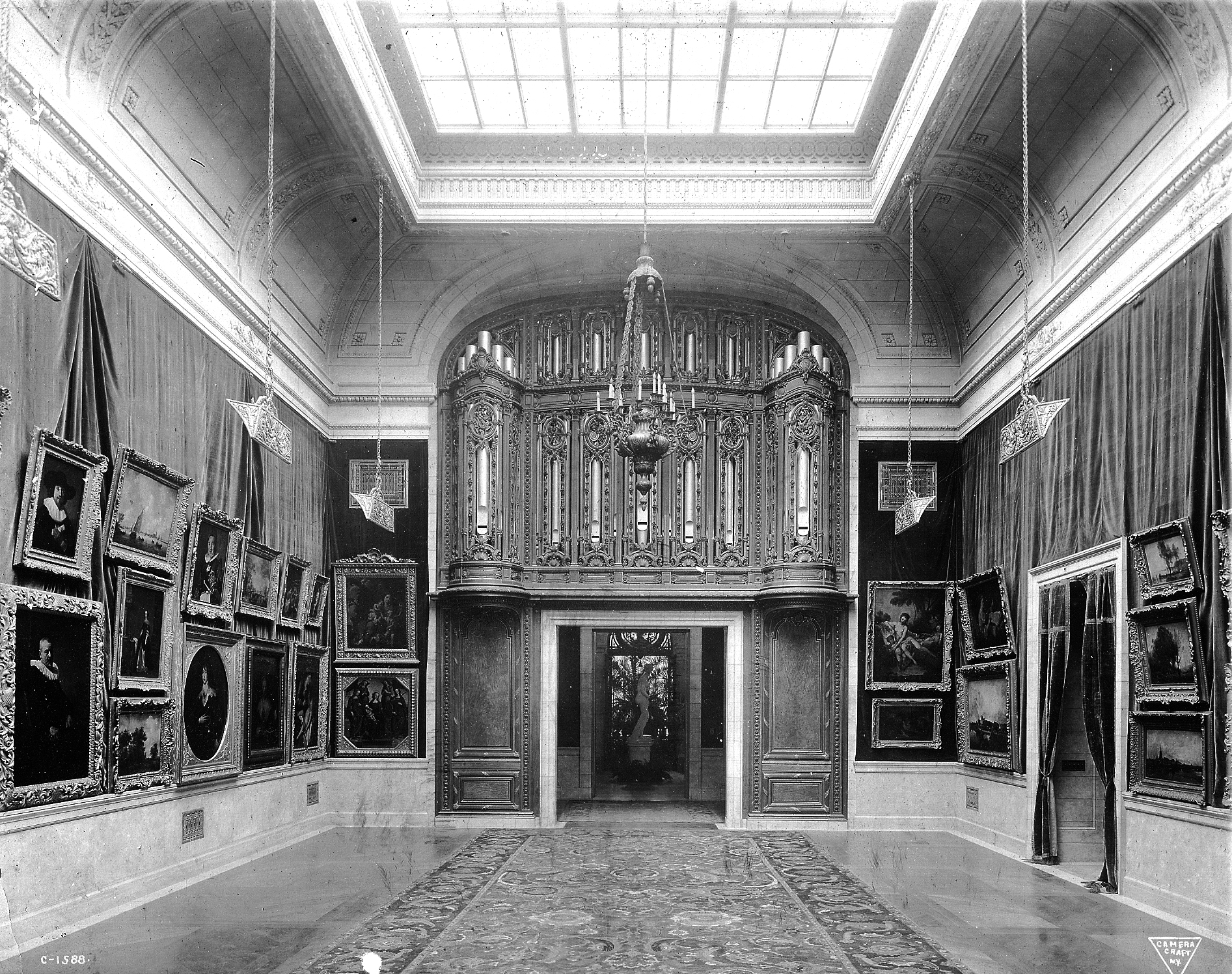
Organ in the Gallery

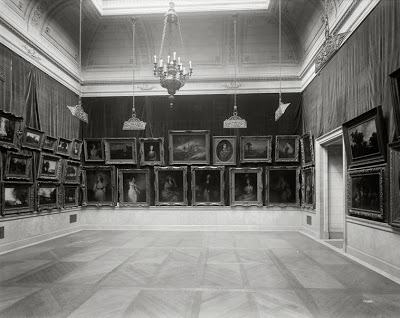
The Gallery

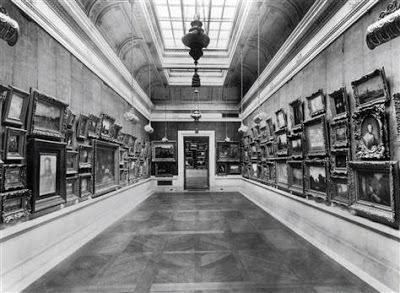
The Gallery

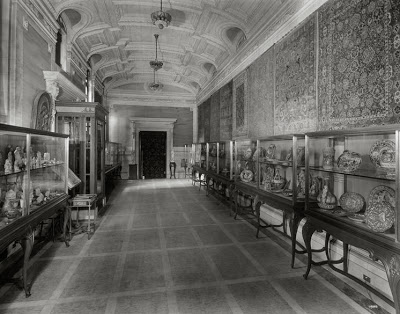
The Faience Gallery

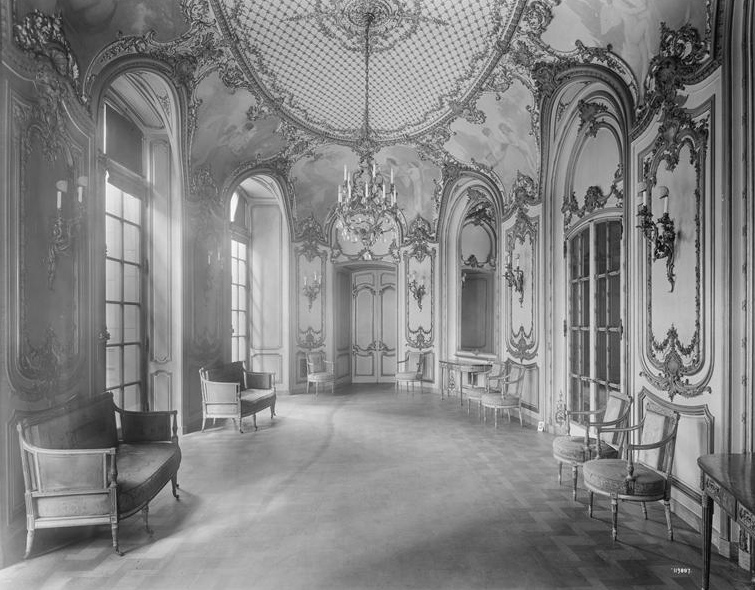
The Petit Salon

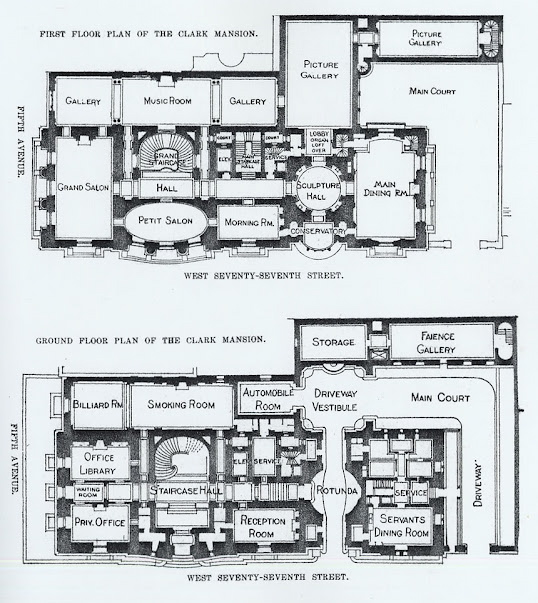
Floor Plans

== See also ==
- William A. Clark
- Huguette Clark
- Copper King Mansion
