= Andree Clark Bird Refuge =

Wildlife refuge in Santa Barbara County, California, U.S.

Coordinates: 34.4212°N 119.66°W

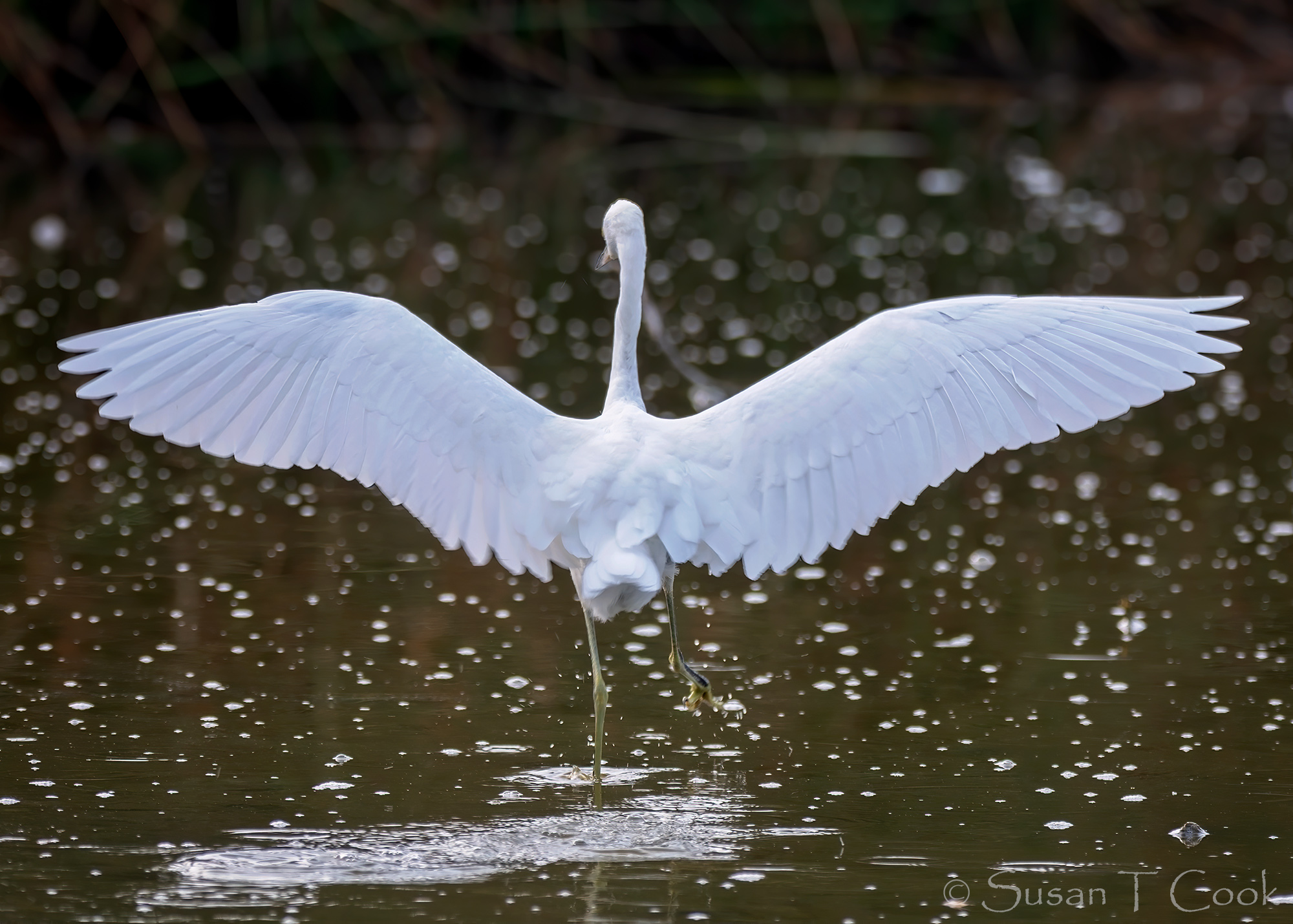
A Snowy Egret in Andree Clark Bird Refuge

Andrée Clark Bird Refuge, a 42-acre (170,000 m^{2}) saltwater marsh, is one of the largest wildlife refuges in Santa Barbara County, California, United States. The refuge has a 29-acre (120,000 m^{2}) freshwater/brackish lake, an artificially modified estuary, which drains through East Beach into the Pacific Ocean.

The refuge is named for Louise Amelia Andrée Clark, older sister of the reclusive heiress Huguette Clark, who owned the Clark property, Bellosguardo (now the Bellosguardo Foundation), located across East Cabrillo Boulevard from the salt pond. In 1928, Huguette Clark donated money for the refuge in honor of her sister, who had died of meningitis in 1919, a week before Andrée's 17th birthday.

== Geography ==
The refuge is bounded by the Santa Barbara Zoo, Highway 101, and East Cabrillo Boulevard.

The eastern and southern perimeter of the Bird Refuge have a bike path around the lake, connecting to the one along the beach to Shoreline Park. There are walking paths along the northern shore and three viewing platforms for birdwatching and other wildlife observation.

== Natural history ==
The number of bird species observed at the refuge totals over 200, in both resident and migratory populations. Sensitive wildlife species include: Tidewater goby (Eucyclogobius newberryi), Western pond turtle (Actinemys marmorata), and several birds protected under the Migratory Bird Treaty Act of 1918.

According to the Santa Barbara Department of Parks and Recreation, common bird species in the refuge include ruddy ducks, American coots, mallards, California gulls, western gulls, red-winged blackbirds, and black-crowned night herons.

== History ==
Originally, water from Sycamore Creek drained into the estuary. However, in the 1880s the construction of a railroad through the area blocked off the inflow of water. In the 1870s and early 1880s, Bradley's Race Track surrounded the lake.

In the 1920s, the city of Santa Barbara restored the site for the purpose of providing a refuge for wild birds that are migrating through or permanently residing in the area.

In 1928, Huguette Clark, daughter of the owner of Bellosguardo, donated $50,000 to the city of Santa Barbara to excavate the pond and create an artificial freshwater lake. Clark stipulated that the facility would be named Andrée Clark Bird Refuge, in memory of her deceased sister. The girls were daughters of "Copper King" William A. Clark, who began to vacation at Bellosguardo with his family in the early 1920s. As an earlier remembrance of the sister, the Clarks donated land in New York for the first Girl Scout camp in the United States, Camp Andree Clark. A rustic cabin on the Bellosguardo estate also is named for the sister, Andrée.

Huguette Clark donated more funds in 1930 to complete work in the plans designed by locally renowned landscape designer and horticulturalist Ralph Stevens. And in 1989, after the lake filled up with algae, Huguette Clark donated another $30,000 for cleanup and educational programs. In 2012, the cost for needed rehabilitation of the lake was estimated at $1 million.

The Andrée Clark Bird Refuge is a historic district contributing property within the East Cabrillo Boulevard Parkway Historic District.

== See also ==
- Bellosguardo Foundation
- Camp Andrée Clark
- Empty Mansions
