= Copper King Mansion =

Historic house in Montana, United States

- W. A. Clark Mansion
- U.S. National Register of Historic Places
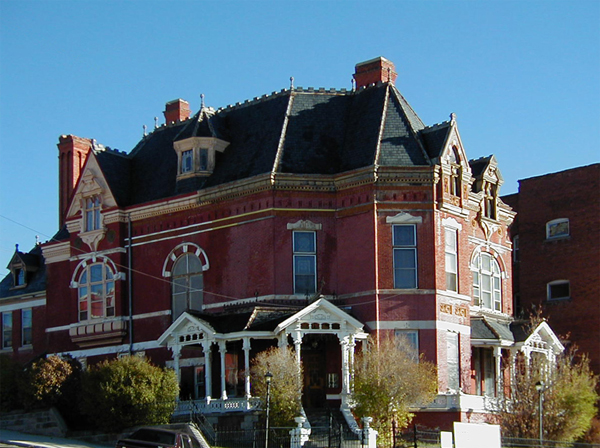
- Exterior view of Copper King Mansion from southwest, May 2002

- Location within Montana Location within the United States
- Location: 219 W Granite, Butte, Montana
- Coordinates: 46°0′52″N 112°32′21″W
- Area: 1 acre (0.40 ha)
- Built: 1884-1888
- Architectural style: Late 19th And 20th Century Revivals, Modern Elizabethan Architect = C.H.Brown
- NRHP reference No.: 70000366
- Added to NRHP: October 6, 1970

The Copper King Mansion, also known as the W. A. Clark Mansion, is a 34-room residence of Romanesque Revival Victorian architecture that was built from 1884 to 1888 as the Butte, Montana, residence of William Andrews Clark, one of Montana's three famous Copper Kings. The home features fresco painted ceilings, elegant parquets of rare imported wood, gas and electric chandeliers, ornate hand-carved fireplaces and stairways, and stained-glass windows. The mansion was added to the National Register of Historic Places in 1970.

The Copper King Mansion has been privately owned, operated, and occupied by the Cote family since 1953. The home is operated as a bed and breakfast. Guided tours are available during the summer tourist season or by appointment during the winter months. The home underwent restoration in 2012.

The building of the Copper King Mansion is described in the bestselling biography of Clark's daughter, Huguette, Empty Mansions: The Mysterious Life of Huguette Clark and the Spending of a Great American Fortune by Bill Dedman and Paul Clark Newell, Jr.
