= William Gowers =

William Gowers may refer to:

- William Frederick Gowers (1875–1954), British colonial administrator
- William Gowers (neurologist) (William Richard Gowers, 1845–1915), British neurologist
- Timothy Gowers (William Timothy Gowers, born 1963), British mathematician
- Patrick Gowers (William Patrick Gowers, 1936–2014), an English composer

== See also ==
- Gowers, a surname
- William Gower (born c. 1662), English Member of Parliament
- William B. Gower (1873–1937), English-American businessman
- Billy Gowers (born 1996), Australian rules footballer
