= Bellosguardo Foundation =

American charitable organization

Coordinates: 34°25′7″N 119°39′40″W

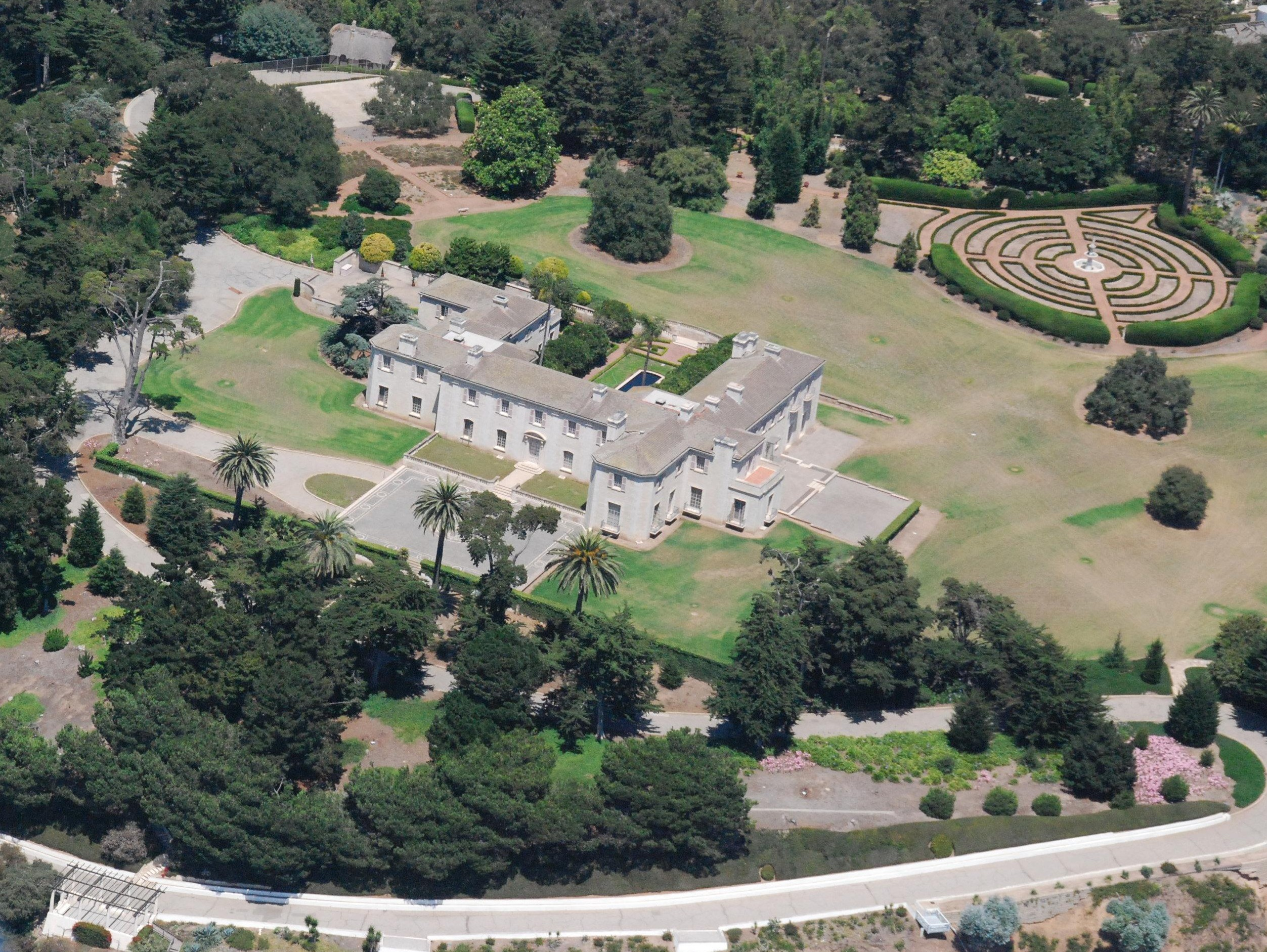
- Founded: 2014
- Founder: Huguette Clark
- Type: Charitable organization (IRS exemption status): 501(c)(3)
- Purpose: arts
- Location: 1407 East Cabrillo Boulevard, Santa Barbara, California, 93108
- Key people: Dick Wolf (chair of the board); Jeremy Lindaman (president)
- Revenue: $1,938,567 (2024-2025)
- Expenses: $1,765,688 (2024-2025)
- Employees: 8
- Volunteers: 35
- Website: http://www.bellosguardo.org/
- Note: Revenue includes $556,600 in unrelated business revenue from event space rental.

The Bellosguardo Foundation is a charitable organization for the arts located at the oceanside estate in Santa Barbara, California, known as Bellosguardo, one of the empty mansions of the reclusive copper heiress Huguette Clark.

Registered in the State of New York, the arts foundation was formed to administer the Bellosguardo property according to the provisions in the will of Huguette Clark, who died in 2011 at age 104. Well known in her youth as an heiress, and again in her later years for being a recluse, she was an artist, art collector, and philanthropist, the youngest child of Senator William A. Clark.

The great home sat furnished but unvisited by Huguette Clark and her mother after about 1951. The staff was under orders to keep the home as it was, and automobiles remained in the carriage house with 1949 license plates.

The story of Bellosguardo and the Clarks figures prominently in the bestselling nonfiction book Empty Mansions, which is being developed into a television series by HBO.

Scheduled docent-led tours of the home began in 2023. At first, because of city restrictions, tours were limited to supporters. Now tours are open to anyone. Visitors sign up for free on the foundation's website to receive notifications of tour dates. The foundation in 2025 received approval of permits from the city of Santa Barbara allowing tours for the public.

The foundation hosted an inaugural fundraiser at the mansion on October 13, 2018, with more than 500 people paying $1,500 or more to attend. Public musical events have been held, such as a flamenco dance presentation during Santa Barbara's Old Spanish Days Fiesta.

The foundation's annual tax return lists its mission as: "Bellosguardo Foundation fosters and promotes the arts by offering docent-led tours of the house and gardens with an emphasis on the architecture, decorative and fine art collections, and gardens. The foundation hosts musical performances, lectures and other events at the property to further the arts and open the home to interested visitors." Formed as a private foundation, its five-year transition to a public charity with the required substantial public support was completed with the filing of an IRS Form 990 in May 2024.

== Estate history ==
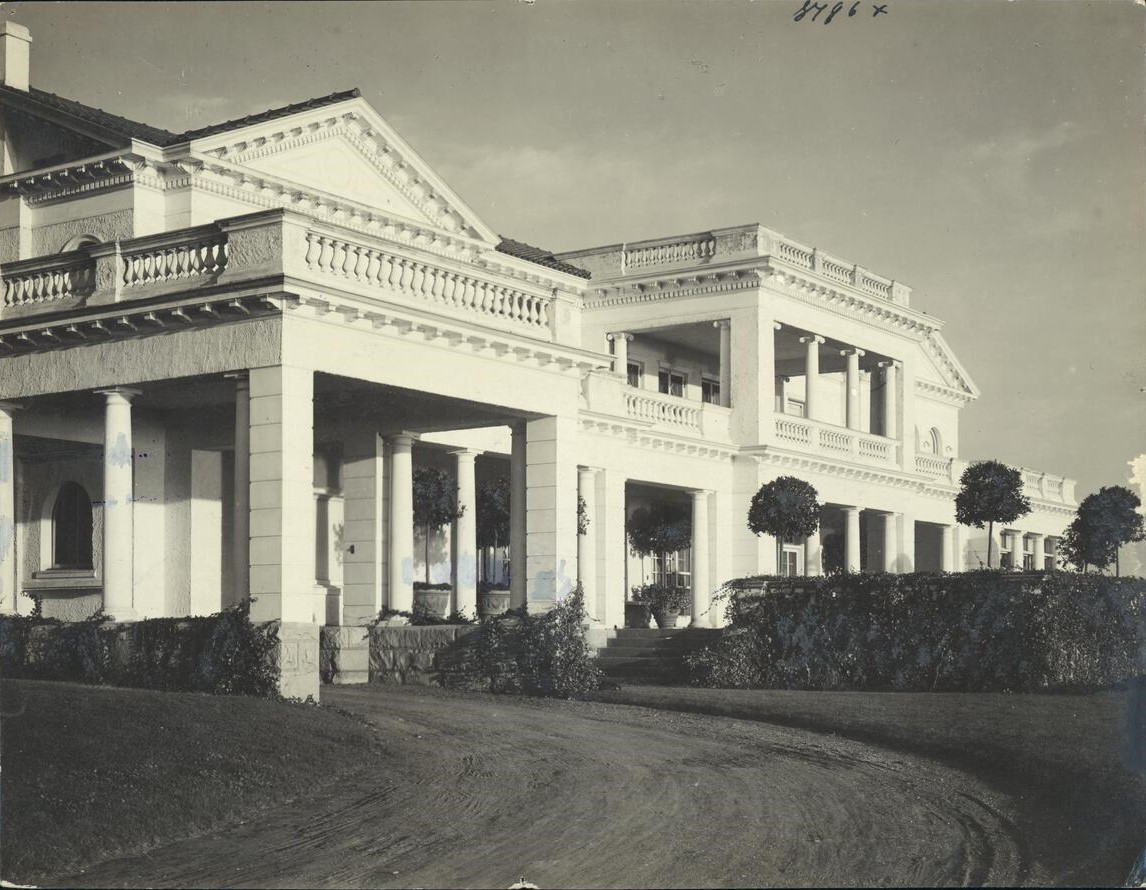
Exterior view of the Graham residence in Santa Barbara, c. 1920

A sprawling estate on more than 23 acres overlooking the Pacific Ocean, Bellosguardo was the Clark summer home. It was named Bellosguardo, meaning "beautiful lookout" in Italian, by the previous owners, the William Miller Graham family. The Clark family bought the property and its Italianate mansion in 1923, two years before Senator William Clark died. After the 1925 Santa Barbara earthquake damaged the home, his widow, Anna Clark, Huguette's mother, had a new 22,000-square-foot mansion built in a French style, designed by Reginald Davis Johnson, completed in 1933. The property has 1,000 feet (304.8 m) of ocean frontage.

In 1928, Huguette Clark was married at the original Bellosguardo mansion in a private ceremony. Her husband, William Gower, was a Princeton graduate and the son of William Clark's top accountant. They were divorced in 1930.

Huguette also was instrumental in cleaning up the 42-acre saltwater marsh across East Cabrillo Boulevard from Bellosguardo, now a lake known as the Andrée Clark Bird Refuge. The refuge is named for Louise Amelia Andrée Clark, Huguette's older sister, who died of meningitis in 1919, a week before Andrée's 17th birthday. In 1928, Huguette donated $50,000 to the city of Santa Barbara to excavate a pond and create an artificial freshwater lake. She donated more funds in 1930 and 1989. Andrée is also remembered on the Bellosguardo property with a rustic thatched-roof cottage, built by the Grahams, that was renamed Andrée's Cottage.

Huguette inherited Bellosguardo from her mother in 1963, issuing two instructions to staff: keep everything in first-class condition, and make no changes.

== Organization ==
Huguette Clark died in New York in 2011 at the age of 104, and in her will directed that the property be given to a new Bellosguardo Foundation for the fostering and promotion of the arts. The nonprofit foundation, which was formed after a contest over the will with the help of the New York Attorney General's Charitable Division Bureau, determined to open the property for public tours and arts events.

It was 2018, seven years after Clark died, before her Bellosguardo property was transferred to the foundation, after settlement of the dispute over her will as well as negotiations with the Internal Revenue Service about gift taxes due.

In addition to the property and any furnishings and art in the home, Bellosguardo received Clark's extensive doll collection (with most of the collection auctioned off at nearly $2 million, and selected dolls kept by the foundation). A public auction was held in January 2020 to sell the dolls for the benefit of the foundation, with a few dolls to remain on display at Bellosguardo.

== Leadership ==
The legal settlement of the Clark estate called for one board member to come from the Clark relatives who challenged Huguette's will, and one from the former Corcoran Gallery of Art in Washington supported by the Clark family, and one from her attorney in Santa Barbara. The rest of the initial trustees were nominated by the mayor of Santa Barbara, and chosen by the New York attorney general. The first family representative on the board was Ian Devine, a great-grandnephew of Huguette Clark.

As of June 2025, the trustees are:

- Dick Wolf, film and television producer, chair of the foundation
- Sandi Nicholson, community philanthropist, secretary of the foundation
- Stephen Clark, vice president and general counsel, J. Paul Getty Trust
- Josh Conviser, author/film producer
- Jim Hurley, retired attorney for the late Huguette Clark in Santa Barbara
- Robert L. Lieff, of counsel/founder, Lieff Cabraser
- Charles Patrizia, former Corcoran Gallery of Art, representative
- Joan Rutkowski, retired opera singer/community philanthropist
- Gary Tobey, president, Haworth Marketing & Media Co.

The foundation's president is Jeremy Lindaman, who was a political consultant to former Santa Barbara mayor Helene Schneider, who nominated most of the original board of trustees. The trustees were then chosen by the New York attorney general's office.
