= William Miller Graham =

American oil tycoon (1860–2930)

William Miller Graham (December 14, 1860 – February 20, 1930) was an oil tycoon known as the "California Oil King".

== Early life ==
Graham was born on December 14, 1860, in Cornplanter, Pennsylvania, where his father was an engineer at the oil wells. He had at least three sisters and four brothers.

He was a graduate of the United States Military Academy at West Point.

== Career ==
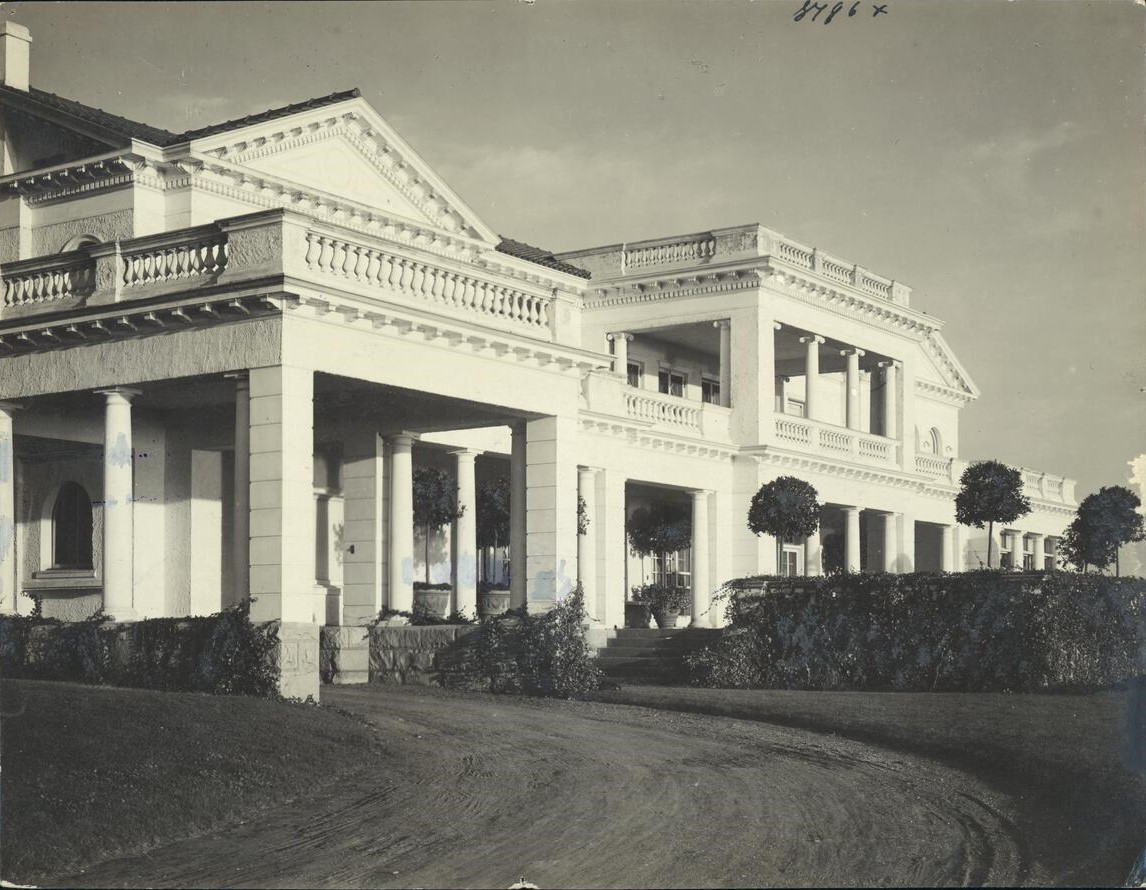
Exterior view of the Graham residence in Santa Barbara, c. 1920

Graham, who moved from Pennsylvania to Tulsa, Oklahoma, made his fortune in petroleum holdings in Carter County, Oklahoma. He later started California Oilfields Limited, took leases in the Coalinga Oil Fields, then sold the company to Royal Dutch-Shell in 1913. He served as president of the Graham Oil and Gas company. In 1910, he traveled to New York to close a deal "that contemplates supplying California oil for consumption by trans-Atlantic steamers."

By the mid-1920s, Graham was having serious financial problems. His fortune, at one time well over $20,000,000, had shrunk to $150. When he filed a voluntary bankruptcy in the District Court of Los Angeles in 1925, his debts were in excess of $1,643,000 against assets totaling $1,706. His largest creditor was the Prairie Oil and Gas Company of Oklahoma, whom he owed $600,000.

=== Society life ===
In 1903, Graham purchased more than 23 ocean-side acres in Santa Barbara from George Booth where Booth had built a simple Victorian home. The Grahams hired architect Francis W. Wilson who designed them a grand 25,000 square foot Italian villa featuring a 26-foot-wide veranda. The named the new house, Bellosguardo. After their divorce, his wife sold Bellosguardo to Senator William A. Clark for $300,000. Following the 1925 Santa Barbara earthquake which badly damaged the home, Clark's widow rebuilt a new house which their daughter, Huguette Clark, owned until her death in 2011.

The Grahams became prominent in society throughout the United States and abroad, particularly in London. They attended balls at the Savoy Hotel and were boxeholders at Convent Gardens. In 1910, they rented a house in Grosvenor Square, (Note: His wife had tried to rent Stafford House, the London townhouse of the Duke of Sutherland but was rebuffed.) where she threw a party with Russian dancers Anna Pavlova and Mikhail Mordkin as the entertainment. Among the guests was Lady Paget, Lord Kintore, Priscilla, Lady Annesley; Lord and Lady Knaresborough, the Danish Minister, Lord Grimthorpe, Ogden Reid, and William Phillips of the American Embassy, Lady Ross, Mrs. Hope Vere, Mrs. Rudolph Spreckels and Francis Carolan of San Francisco, Sheldon Cosby, Mrs. de Grasse Fox, Moncure Robinson, Robin Grey, Creighton Webb, Lady Wilton, Mr. and Mrs. Harold Baring, Mr. and Mrs. Glasgow, and Mrs. Chauncey.

He was also an ardent polo fan and was reported to have owned "quite a stable at one time."

== Personal life ==
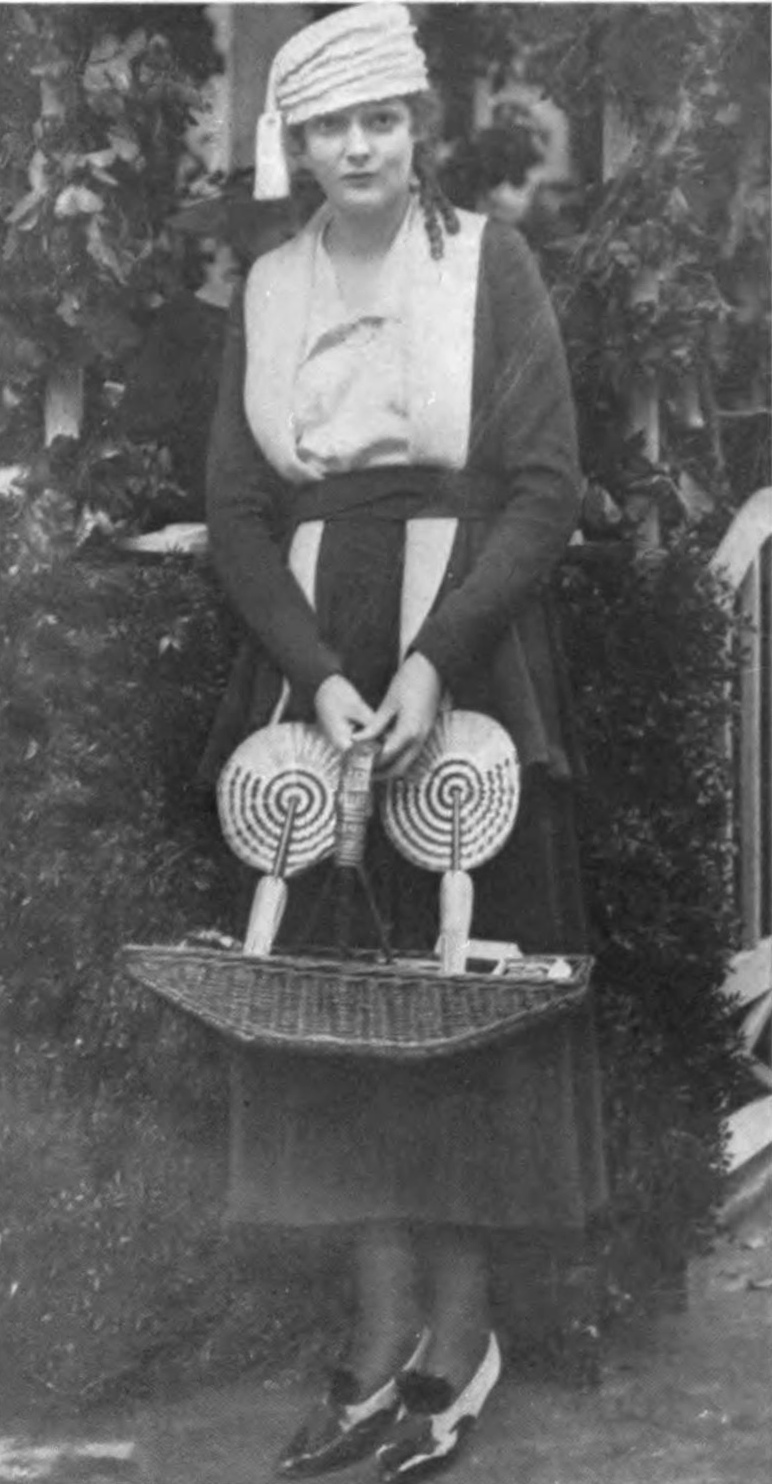
Photograph of his daughter, Geraldine, selling U.S. fans at the MacDougal Alley Fiesta, a benefit for the Red Cross, June 1917

In 1889, Graham was married to Lee Eleanor "Birdie" Pollock (1870–1944). Originally from Paris, Kentucky, her family moved to Philadelphia, where she met Graham at a church social. After they married, they moved to Oklahoma where he struck oil and made a fortune. They came east after that and were prominent in society, both in New York City and in Newport, Rhode Island. Before Birdie obtained a divorce from Graham in Tulsa in January 1921, they were the parents of:

- William Earl Graham (1890–1949), who married Genevieve Tallant, a daughter of George Payne Tallant and Melita Isabel (née Robinson) Tallant, in 1928. They divorced and she married Cecil Irwin Smith in 1932 and he married Olivia Pillsbury (née Gibson) Tubbs, divorced wife of Tallant Tubbs, the former Republican senator, in 1935.
- Geraldine Pollock Graham (1901–1976), who was engaged to Whitney Warren Jr., son of architect Whitney Warren, in 1920. Their engagement was called off in 1921, and she married Charles William Dabney Jr., son of Charles William Dabney, in 1925. After his death in 1938, she married Juilliard McDonald Jr. After his death in 1945, she married Disney art director James Spalding Bodrero.

Their daughter made her formal début at Bellosguardo during the season of 1919. When the Prince of Wales visited California. he met and danced with Geraldine, and was quoted as saying that she was "the most beautiful girl in America." Reportedly, his wife received $20,000,000 in their divorce as well as Bellosguardo. In November 1921, his ex-wife, who became known as Mrs. Pollock Graham, was reportedly engaged to James J. Van Alen (widower of Emily Astor, daughter of Caroline Schermerhorn Astor), but the two did not marry before his death in London in 1923.

After their divorce, he married Lillian Hansen (1890–1981). Graham died at his home, 424 North Harvard Boulevard, in Los Angeles on February 20, 1930, and was buried at Hollywood Memorial Park. His first wife died in San Francisco in September 1944, and his widow, Lillian, outlived both of his children, dying in Los Angeles in 1981.
