= Student Life (newspaper) =

Student-run newspaper of Washington University in St. Louis

- "The independent newspaper of Washington University in St. Louis since 1878"
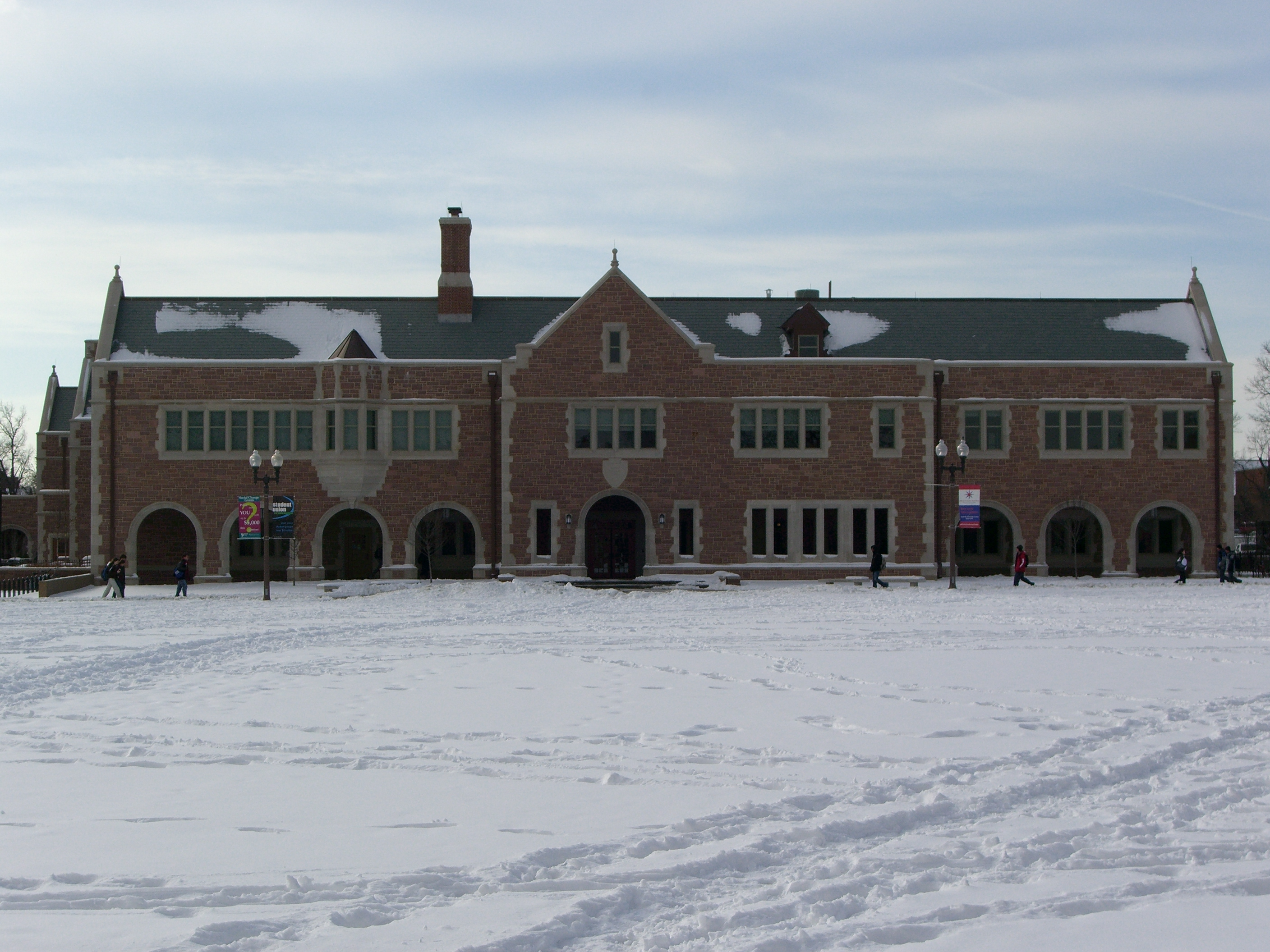
- The Danforth University Center, which houses Student Life offices
- Type: Weekly college newspaper
- Format: 21" print, web
- School: Washington University in St. Louis
- Owner(s): Washington University Student Media, Inc.
- Founded: 1878
- Headquarters: 1 Brookings Drive #1039 St. Louis, MO 63130
- Circulation: Print: 6,000 / Web: 200,000 per month
- Website: studlife.com

Student Life (StudLife) is the independent student-run newspaper of Washington University in St. Louis. It was founded in 1878 and incorporated in 1999. It is published by the Washington University Student Media, Inc. and is not subject to the approval of the University administration, thus making it an independent student voice.

It is published regularly every Thursday. Special issues include orientation and commencement issues, an April Fool's Day issue (called Student Libel); and a Valentine's Day issue centered on sex (called Student Love). It has won multiple National Pacemaker Awards, recognizing the best college newspapers in the country, most recently in 2011.

It is an affiliate of UWIRE, which distributes and promotes its content to their network.

== Sections ==
- News is the largest section in Student Life, appearing in each issue. This section reports on events pertaining to the Washington University community, St. Louis news, and national news.
- Forum also appears in each issue and consists of columns written by the regular Forum editors and staff columnists. Contributions are also accepted from the University community. Forum also publishes a staff editorial written by the newspaper's Editorial Board. The Editorial Board is led by the Senior Forum Editor, and it consists of the Forum Editors, Editor-in-Chief, Managing Editor(s) and Senior Editors. Letters to the Editor and Editorial Cartoons are also published in Forum.
- Sports appears in every issue and provides the latest scores in Bears games as well as profiles of the players.
- Scene is the lifestyles section in Student Life. It runs in every issue and focuses on campus trends and the activities of students and faculty. Scene covers a broad range of topics. Scene also runs an advice column called “Save Me, Scene!”
- The Photo section occasionally publishes photo essays ranging in topic from engineering antics to profiles of homeless people.

== Awards ==
- National Pacemaker Award (2000, 2005, 2009, 2011)
- Online Pacemaker (2011)
- Missouri College Media Association — Sweepstakes cumulative winner, with points awarded and tallied from individual categories (2009, 2010, 2013, 2018, 2025)

== Alumni ==
- Ken Cooper — former national editor for The Boston Globe
- Bill Dedman — Pulitzer Prize-winning investigative reporter and author of the bestselling biography Empty Mansions
- Jonathan Greenberger — ABC News Washington bureau chief and executive producer of This Week with George Stephanopoulos
- Michael Isikoff — chief investigative correspondent for Yahoo! News, formerly of NBC News, Newsweek
- Sarah Kliff — healthcare journalist for The New York Times, formerly with The Washington Post and Vox
- Jeff Lean — investigative editor at The Washington Post
- James T. Madore — business reporter at Newsday
- Lorie Cranor — former chief technologist for the Federal Trade Commission and computer science professor at Carnegie Mellon University
- Laura Meckler — national education correspondent for The Washington Post, former White House reporter for The Wall Street Journal
- Mike Peters — winner of the 1981 Pulitzer Prize for Editorial Cartooning and creator of Mother Goose & Grimm
- Perry Stein — national Department of Justice reporter for The Washington Post
