= John J. Creedon =

American businessman (1924–2020)

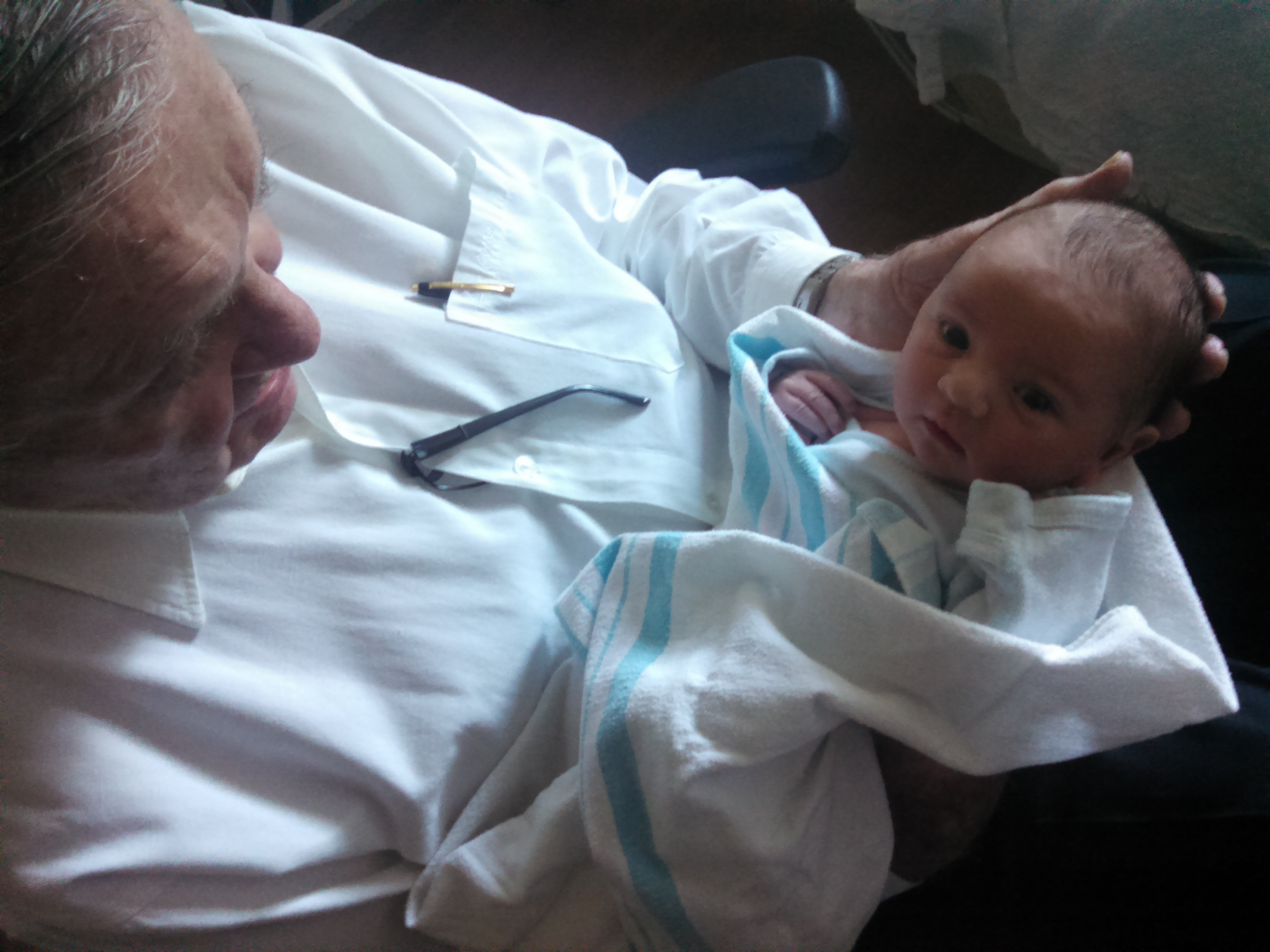
John J Creedon with his 10th grandchild Zara.

John Joseph Creedon (August 1, 1924 – October 11, 2020) was an American businessman who served as the president and chief executive officer of Metropolitan Life Insurance Company.

== Early life ==
Creedon was the son of Bartholomew and Emma Glynn Creedon. He received his higher education at New York University undergraduate and law schools, where he was awarded a B.S. degree in 1952, magna cum laude, and an LL.B. and LL.M in 1955 and 1962, respectively. On October 21, 1987, Creedon was awarded an honorary doctor of laws degree by the Board of Regents of The University of the State of New York.

== Career ==
Creedon began his career in MetLife's group department. After high school, in 1942, he took time out for three years of naval service during World War II. He served on the USS Caliente (AO-53). After returning to MetLife from naval service, he attended New York University's college and law school in the evening. In 1955 he became an attorney on MetLife's legal staff. He became senior vice-president and general counsel in 1973, and executive vice-president in 1976. In 1980, he became president, and in 1983 he was named chief executive officer. He retired in 1989, and served as a director of MetLife until 1996, and as a member of MetLife's Advisory Council until 2006.

Creedon served on the Boards of Directors of various business corporations over the years including ArvinMeritor, Melville, Nynex and New York Telephone Company, Praxair, Rockwell International, Sonat, St. Regis Paper and Union Carbide and on the Advisory Board of the Firemark Global Insurance Fund. Creedon was a member of the Advisory Board of a number of funds of Centre Partners Management LLC.

During President Reagan's tenure, he served as a member of the Presidential Commission on Executive, Judicial and Legislative Salaries and on the President's Commission on the HIV Epidemic. In 1987, Creedon served as chairman of the American Council of Life Insurance and as national chairman of the U.S. Savings Bonds campaign. He was also general chairman of the Greater New York Blood Program campaign for 1986 and 1987.

Creedon was also a trustee of New York University and New York University's Law Center Foundation. He served as an adjunct professor of law at New York University School of Law from 1962 to 1973, and was a trustee of the Practicing Law Institute from 1968 to 1981. He has also served as a director or trustee of a number of other non-profit organizations, including the National AIDS Fund and the French-American School of New York in Larchmont, where he served as Chairman. He was a member of the New York Bar and the Bar of the Supreme Court of the United States. Mr. Creedon was president of the American Bar Foundation from 1980 to 1982 and chairman of the Business Law Section of the American Bar Association in 1975 - 1976.

In the early 1970s, he served as Editor of the Business Lawyer, the pre-eminent legal periodical for business lawyers in the United States. He also served as a member of the Committee which prepared the Model Debenture Indenture and the Commentaries on its Provisions, a landmark project of the American Bar Foundation. Creedon wrote numerous articles published in the Business Lawyer and other legal publications.

He was president (1977–78) of the Association of Life Insurance Counsel, chairman (1981) of the Life Insurance Council of New York and the Business Council of New York State (1987).

In 1988, Creedon was made an honorary Girl Scout, and the Girl Scout Outdoor Education Center, a national training laboratory in outdoor education, was named the John J. Creedon Camp of Tomorrow in his honor. It is now known as John J. Creedon Education Center and is part of the Edith Macy Conference Center complex.

Creedon served as a consultant to the U.S. House Committee on Post Office and Civil Service from 1991 through 1994, assisting the Committee in the analysis of proposals to reform the Federal Employees Health Benefits Program.

== Personal life ==
Creedon was married to Diane Ardouin, with whom he had twins—Jean-Philippe Creedon and Genevieve Creedon. He had four children—Juliette Kvernland, Michele (Wenzler) Fox, John Creedon and David Creedon—by his previous marriage to the late Vivian Elser. His six children gave him twelve grandchildren and four great grandchildren.

Creedon resided in Larchmont, New York for nearly 30 years and was a member of the Larchmont Yacht Club, USS Caliente (AO-53) Association, and the Blind Brook Club.

Creedon died in October 2020 at the age of 96.
