= Charles W. Clark (businessman) =

American businessman (1871–1933)

- Born: November 3, 1871; Deer Lodge, Montana, US
- Died: April 3, 1933 (aged 61); New York City, US
- Resting place: Woodlawn Cemetery (Bronx, New York)
- Occupation: Businessman
- Spouses: Katherine Quinn Roberts; Celia Tobin
- Parent(s): William Andrews Clark Sr. Katherine Louise Stauffer
- Relatives: Huguette Clark (half sister) William Andrews Clark Jr. (brother)

Charles Walker Clark, also known as "C. W. Clark" or "Charlie Clark" (November 3, 1871 – April 3, 1933), was an American businessman and the eldest son of William Andrews Clark Sr., one of the Copper Kings.

== Early life ==
Clark was born on November 3, 1871, in Deer Lodge, Montana. His father, William A. Clark (1839–1925), was a Montana copper magnate and later a United States Senator for Montana. His mother, Katherine Louise Stauffer (1844–1893), was a socialite.

== Education and career ==
Charlie was provided elite schooling in New York City and throughout Europe, and graduated from Yale University in 1893. He could read Greek and French, and played the violin. He served as the manager and later as chairman of the United Verde Copper Company in Jerome, Arizona. Together with his father and his brother, he was also a partner in a bank in Butte, Montana.

== Personal life ==
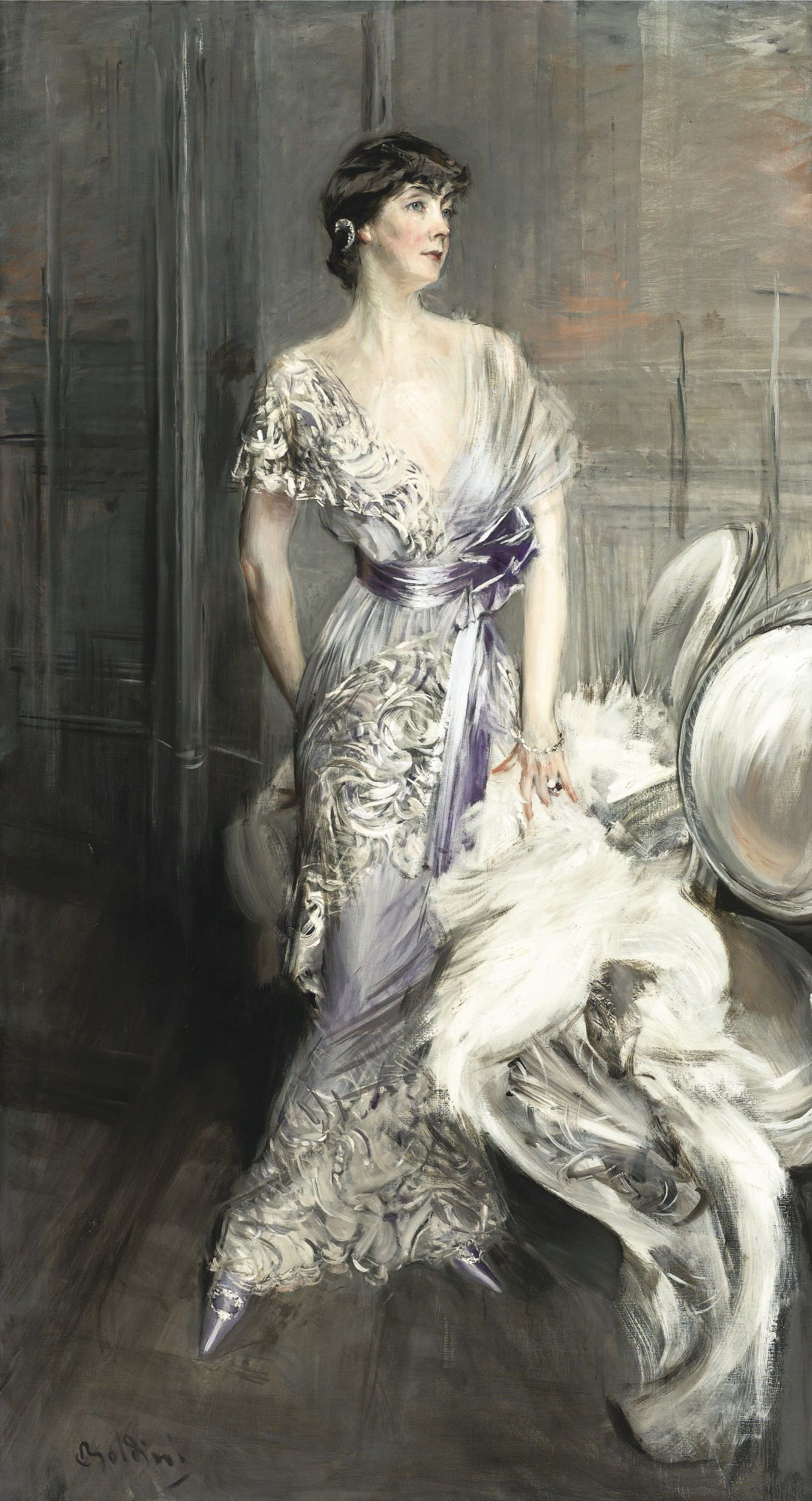
Portrait Of Celia Tobin Clark (Charles's second wife) by Italian artist Giovanni Boldini

In 1896, Charles Clark married Katherine Quinn Roberts, who died in New York City in January 1904. Later that year, he married Cecelia "Celia" Tobin (1874–1965), a member of San Francisco high society, who came from one of San Francisco’s founding families, who opened and grew its Hibernia Bank and were patrons of numerous civic causes. She had been trained as a pianist and in equestrianism. They divorced and she later moved into a home in Hillsborough, California, which became known as the Tobin Clark Estate. Charlie and Celia had four children, three daughters and a son. Following his divorce to Celia becoming official on July 23, 1925, Charlie married his third wife, Elizabeth Wymond Judge in August of that year and they remained married until Charlie's death

According to Pulitzer winner Bill Dedman, Clark had "the longest private railcar ever built, which he sold to Howard Hughes." He was prone to heavy drinking and gambling.

He collected rare books. In 1917, the Book Club of California presented an exhibition of 66 incunabula from his collection at the Hill Tolerton Gallery, San Francisco.

== Mansions and estates ==
Charlie and his various wives held properties throughout the country. The Clark Chateau on Broadway Street in Butte was owned with his first wife, and was his first major mansion with 26 rooms and over 13,000 square feet, located on Broadway Street in Butte, Montana A fan and participant in equestrian sports, Clark resided at his "El Palomar" estate in San Mateo, California, a property he purchased in 1902 which had a polo field and race track. The owner of Thoroughbred racehorses, among his successful runners was United Verde, a horse named for his mining company. United Verde won several stakes races including the 1920 Bashford Manor Stakes and the 1922 Ben Ali Handicap. With his second wife, a Pebble Beach villa was constructed from 1919 - 1925 and featured an Italianate home built around a central courtyard with fountain on a cliff providing sweeping views of the Pacific Ocean. With his third wife, he held a country estate in Aiken, South Carolina.

== Death ==
Charles Clark died of pneumonia on April 3, 1933, in New York City. He was buried in the Clark family mausoleum Woodlawn Cemetery in the Bronx, New York City.
