= William Andrews Clark Jr. =

American philanthropist (1877–1934)

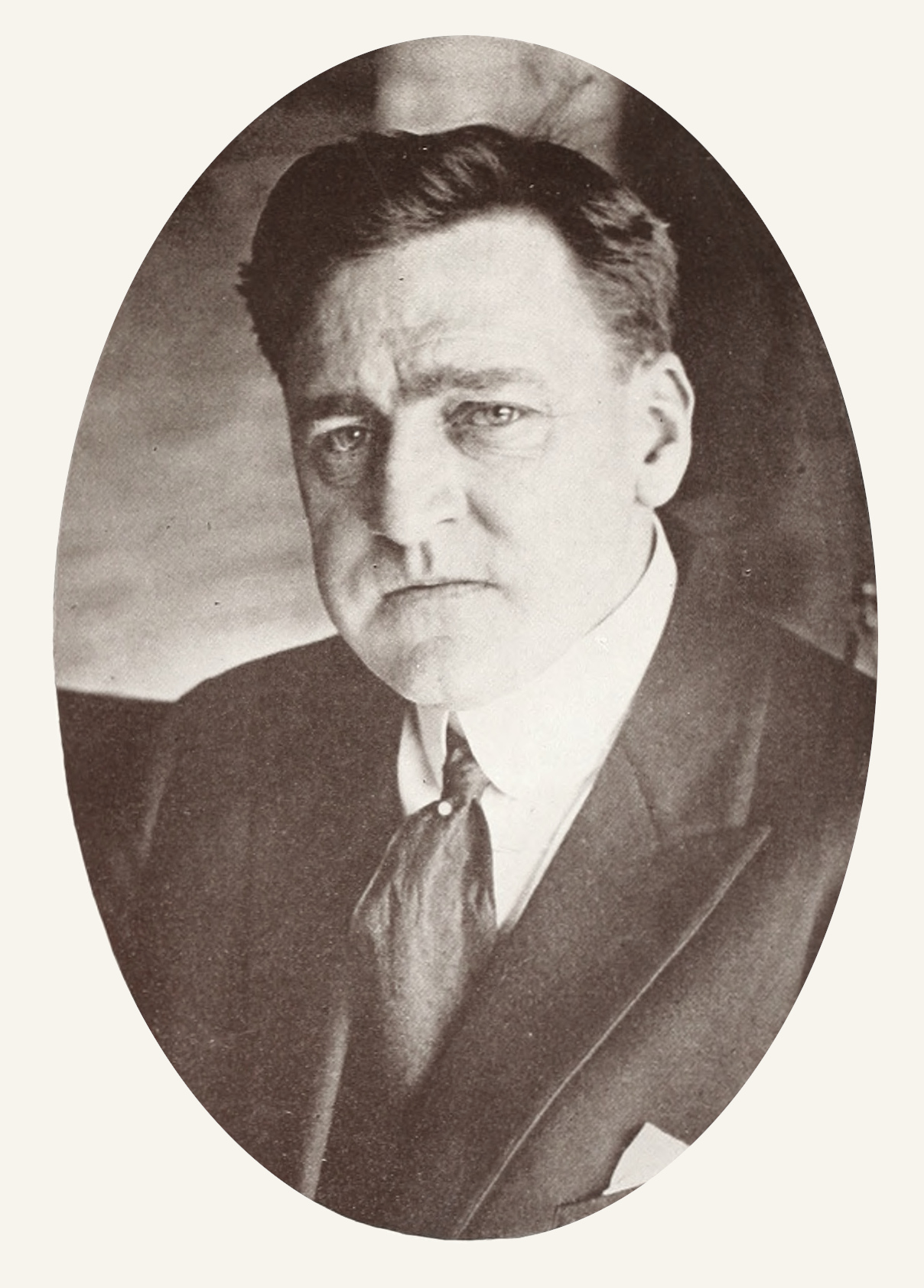
- Born: March 29, 1877; Deer Lodge, Montana, US
- Died: June 14, 1934 (aged 57); Salmon Lake, Montana, US
- Occupations: Businessman, lawyer, book collector, philanthropist
- Spouses: Mabel Duffield Foster (m. 1902; died 1903) Alice McManus (m. 1907; died 1916)
- Partner: Harrison Post
- Children: William A. Clark III
- Parent(s): William A. Clark; Katherine Louise Stauffer
- Relatives: Huguette Clark (half-sister) Charles Walker Clark (brother)

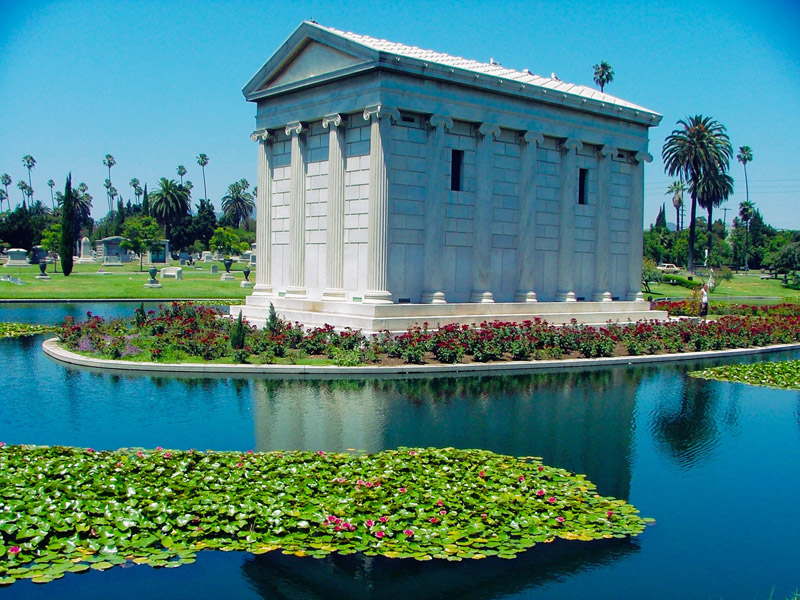
Tomb of philanthropist William A. Clark Jr., Hollywood Forever Cemetery

William Andrews Clark Jr. (March 29, 1877 – June 14, 1934) was an American philanthropist and book collector who founded the Los Angeles Philharmonic and the William Andrews Clark Memorial Library. He was the youngest surviving son of mining magnate and U.S. senator William A. Clark.

== Early life ==
Clark was born on March 29, 1877, in Deer Lodge, Montana, the son of William Andrews Clark Sr. and Katherine Louise Stauffer. He was educated in France and in the New York area and graduated from the University of Virginia with a bachelor's degree in law in 1899.

== Career and hobbies ==
Clark was a partner in the law firm Clark & Roote in Butte, Montana. He also served on the boards of several of his father's mining and industrial concerns.

=== Book collection ===
In the mid-1910s, he began collecting antiquarian and fine press books as a serious hobby (he had dabbled in book buying previous to this). In 1919, he hired bibliographer Robert E. Cowan to consult on book-buying purchases and to help with the compilation of a printed library catalog. The first volume of this was printed in 1920 by San Francisco printer John Henry Nash.

=== Philanthropy ===
He founded the Los Angeles Philharmonic, which debuted in the Trinity Auditorium in 1919, and bequeathed his library of rare books and manuscripts, the William Andrews Clark Memorial Library, to the University of California, Los Angeles upon his death in 1934. He also helped to fund the construction of the Hollywood Bowl.

== Personal life ==
In 1902, he married Mabel Duffield Foster (1880–1903), who died of sepsis following the birth of their son William Andrews Clark III ("Tertius") (1902–1932), who died in a plane crash in Arizona in 1932.

In 1907, he married Alice McManus (1883–1916), a native Nevadan, and they moved their permanent home to Los Angeles in the early 1910s (Clark County, Nevada is named for his father). Their house at Adams Boulevard and Cimarron Street occupied the grounds that the Clark Library is now located.

Clark also had romantic relationships with men. Notable among his lovers was Harrison Post, who co-transcribed Clark's collection of Oscar Wilde's letters to Lord Alfred Douglas. Clark also put Post in charge of the interior decoration of the Clark Library. According to library staff, the thirteen naked men painted on the library's ornate ceiling all have Post's face. Post lived in a mansion across from Clark's on Cimarron Street and inherited a substantial trust fund on Clark's death.

=== Death ===
He died on June 14, 1934, at Salmon Lake, Montana. He is entombed in the family mausoleum which he built on the island in Sylvan Lake at the Hollywood Forever Cemetery. Both of his wives and his son are also in the mausoleum.
