= 1989 DC Prostitute Expulsion =

1989 attempted expulsion of suspected sex workers from Washington, D.C.

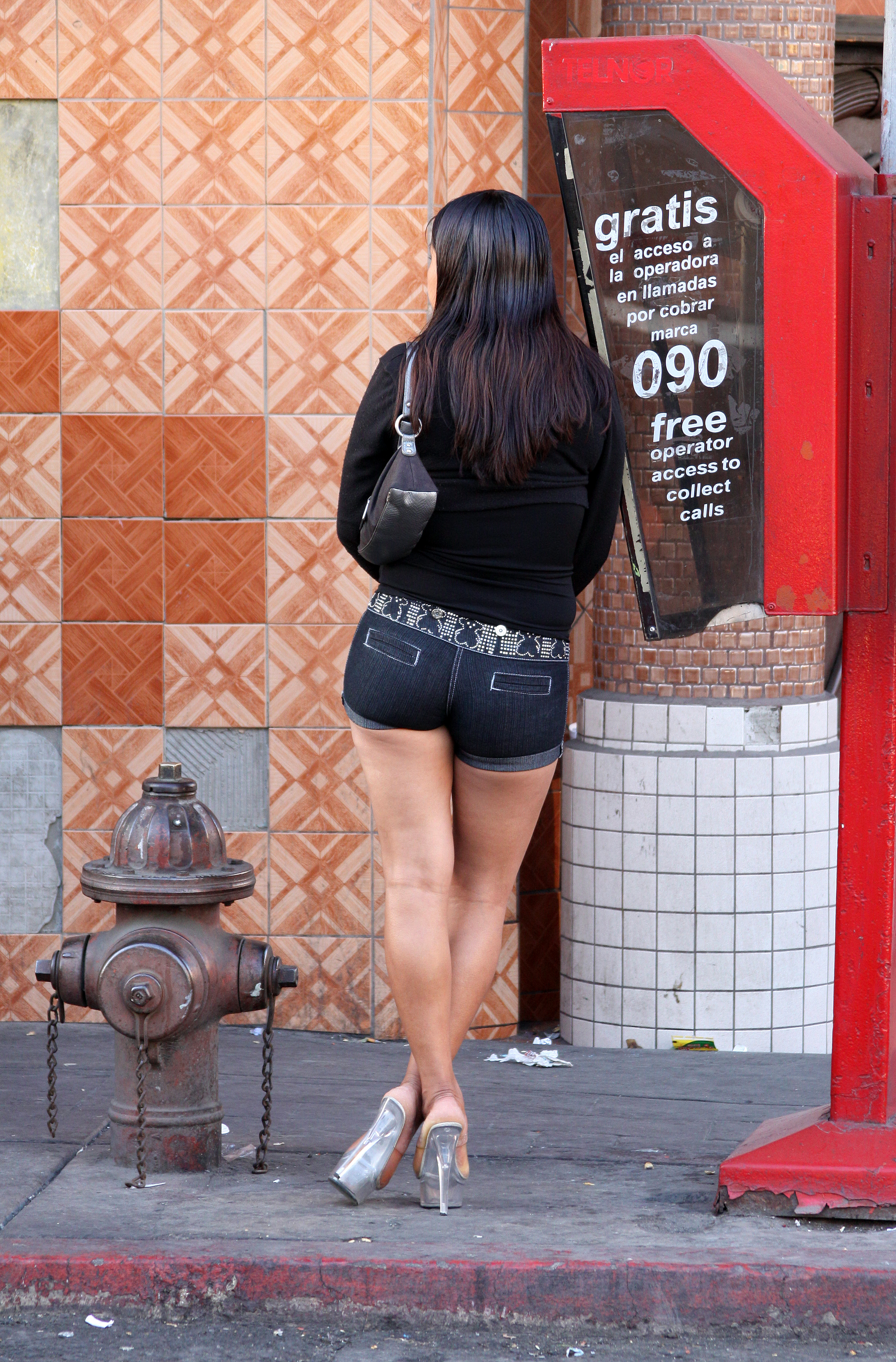
Prostitution arrests saw a significant rise in Washington DC in 1989

The 1989 DC Prostitute Expulsion was the attempted forced removal of a group of suspected sex workers in Washington, D.C., by members of the D.C. police in the early morning of July 25, 1989. Police officers, frustrated by inability to clean up the prostitution problem in D.C.'s 14th Street red-light district, where several police districts came together and prostitutes could easily avoid enforcement efforts by crossing the street, ordered a group of around twenty-four scantily clad women to march from the Thomas Circle area, down 14th Street toward Arlington County, Virginia, via the 14th Street Bridge.

As the group passed the Washington Monument at about 1:30 in the morning, Washington Post reporter Bill Dedman happened by in a taxi on his way home from the Post newsroom, and began interviewing the women and police officers. He ran to the Agriculture Department building across the Mall to use a pay phone to ask the Post metro desk to send a photographer. Before a photographer could be sent, Post photographer Stephen Jaffe also happened by on his way home from another assignment. Post police reporter Jeffrey Goldberg soon arrived. Jaffe began taking photos, causing the police officers to flee.

The women never crossed the bridge, but photos of the parade on the bridge's approach ramp demonstrated the police officers' intent to make them march into Virginia. The women had been marched over a mile down 14th Street. After the police left, the women were driven back to Thomas Circle by men in vans, who had been following the parade at a distance, and most were back on street corners within half an hour.

On the front page of The Washington Post the next day, Dedman and Goldberg recounted the events:

District police have started a new push on prostitution – all the way to Virginia.

Beginning about 1:30 a.m. yesterday at 14th and M streets NW, officers rounded up 24 women from downtown street corners and ordered them on a forced march to the state line.

The angry line of women, many of whom were dressed in leather miniskirts and brightly colored tube tops, ambled 1.4 miles down the left lane of 14th Street, through the business district and across the Mall, grumbling and carrying their spiked-heel shoes all the way.

A police scout car with flashing blue and red lights led the procession and another brought up the rear.

"They said they were taking us to Virginia, that we could work over there," said a woman who identified herself as Toni. "They said we'd go to jail if we stopped."

The next day, Goldberg and Dedman reported that Arlington County police officers admitted having sent homeless people and the mentally ill across the Arlington Memorial Bridge into D.C. in the past. Virginia politicians expressed outrage at the D.C. police action. Congressman Stanford Parris, who represented Virginia's 8th congressional district, complained "We get all the sludge, all the garbage, most of the prisoners, and now their prostitutes." A trade union for prostitutes threatened a lawsuit against the city. In an editorial, The Washington Post lamented, "It is a demeaning spectacle to have human beings herded like cattle in the middle of the night. It is cynical to push a problem into someone else's territory as if that were a solution."

The Post reported the next month that a top police official recommended discipline for a police sergeant who had ordered the march. No discipline was recommended for the four patrol officers in D.C.'s 3rd police district, who had followed the sergeant's orders to force the women to march. "Rules were broken," said Deputy Chief Edward J. Spurlock. "It was a breach of normal police procedure . . . It was not the crime of the century."
