= William B. Gower =

English-American businessman

William Bleckley Gower (1873 – August 30, 1937) was an English-American businessman and close associate of copper magnate William A. Clark.

== Early life ==
Gower was born in England in 1873. He was the son of William Bleckley Gower and Agnes (née Innes) Gower. Among his siblings were brothers Hugh Temple Gower and Edmund Innes Gower. His maternal grandparents were Robert Innes and Margaret (née Clapperton) Innes. His aunt, Margaret Clapperton Innes, married Scottish merchant Henry Forest Alexander. His father was a Cannon Street merchant who declared bankruptcy in July 1871 (together with Charles Arnold Bleckley), but was discharged in 1873.

He emigrated to the United States at the age of eighteen.

== Career ==
For thirty-five years, he was associated in the copper business with William A. Clark, who became a U.S. Senator from Montana, He was the general auditor and accountant for Senator Clark until his death in 1925. Gower served as comptroller of the United Verde Copper Company, of which Clark's son, Charles W. Clark, served as manager and chairman.

== Personal life ==
Gower was married to Helen Margaret Barrie (1875–1955) of Chicago. In New York, they lived at 1060 Fifth Avenue. He was a member of the Knickerbocker Club, the Whist Club, and the Lake Placid Club in Lake Placid, New York. Together, they were the parents of:

- Daisy Agnes Gower (1898–1981), who married Richard Martin Holsten. They divorced and she married Northrup Dawson.
- William MacDonald Levenson Gower (1905–1976), who married Huguette Clark, youngest daughter of Senator William A. Clark, in 1928. They divorced in 1930 and he married Cornelia McGhee (née Baxter) Tevis McKee, a daughter of the Governor of Wyoming Territory George White Baxter, in 1932. Cornelia was the widow of Hugh Tevis and Andrew Hartupee McKee.

Gower died at Garden Cottage at Lake Placid Club on August 30, 1937, at age 63, from the effects of a heart attack suffered a week earlier. He was buried at North Elba Cemetery in North Elba, New York, and left an estate valued at $308,389 gross and $286,309 net. His widow died at her home, 1001 Park Avenue, in 1955.
