= 907 Fifth Avenue =

Residential building in Manhattan, New York

- 907 Fifth Avenue
- Interactive map of the 907 Fifth Avenue area

General information
- Status: Completed
- Type: Residential
- Architectural style: Italian Renaissance
- Location: Fifth Avenue and 72nd Street, Manhattan, New York, United States
- Coordinates: 40°46′19.5″N 73°58′01″W
- Current tenants: 44 units
- Completed: 1915

Technical details
- Floor count: 12

Design and construction
- Architect: J. E. R. Carpenter

907 Fifth Avenue is a luxury residential housing cooperative in Manhattan, New York City, United States.

The 12-story, limestone-faced building is located at Fifth Avenue and 72nd Street on a site once occupied by the 1893 residence of James A. Burden, which had been designed by R. H. Robertson. The apartment block, built in 1916, was the first apartment building to replace a private mansion on Fifth Avenue above 59th Street. It was converted to a cooperative in 1955. J. E. R. Carpenter was the architect; he would be called upon to design many of the luxury apartment buildings that gave a new scale to Fifth Avenue in the 1910s and 1920s. The building won him the 1916 gold medal of the American Institute of Architects.

The building has the aspect of an Italian Renaissance palazzo, built around a central court. Its first four floors are lightly rusticated; deep quoins carry the rusticated feature up the corners to the boldly projecting top cornice. A strong secondary cornice above the fourth floor once made a conciliatory nod to the cornice lines of the private houses that flanked it, whose owners had fought its construction in court. When it opened, there were two 12-room apartments on most floors.

== Notable residents ==
- Samuel Barber (1910–1981), composer.
- Huguette M. Clark (1906–2011), the reclusive heiress, owned all of the eighth floor and half of the 12th.
- William C. Durant (1861–1947), pioneer of the US automobile industry; co-founded General Motors and Chevrolet, founded Frigidaire.
- Richard Gilder (1932–2020), philanthropist
- Rudolph J. Heinemann, art dealer.
- Tali Farhadian Weinstein (born 1974 or 1975), former US federal prosecutor
- J. Frederic Kernochan (1842–1929), attorney and socialite
- Herbert L. Pratt, a Standard Oil Company vice president, rented the largest apartment in the building, starting in 1916, at a rent of $30,000 a year, which occupied the entire top floor, with 25 rooms
- William H. Remick (1866–1922), president of the New York Stock Exchange.
- Boaz Weinstein, hedge fund manager and founder of Saba Capital Management, bought Clark's twelfth floor apartment, 12W, for $25.5 million in 2012.
