= Huguette Clark =

French-born American heiress and philanthropist

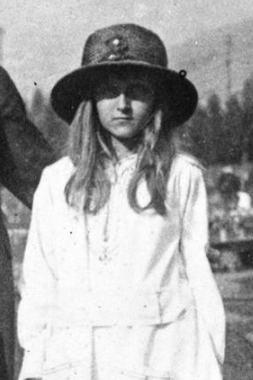
- Clark c. 1917 at Columbia Gardens
- Born: Huguette Marcelle Clark; June 9, 1906; Paris, France
- Died: May 24, 2011 (aged 104); New York City, U.S.
- Resting place: Woodlawn Cemetery, The Bronx, New York
- Education: Spence School
- Occupations: Painter; philanthropist
- Known for: Heiress to Clark copper fortune; recluse
- Spouse: William MacDonald Gower (m. 1928; div. 1930)
- Parent(s): William A. Clark; Anna E. LaChapelle
- Relatives: William Andrews Clark Jr. (half-brother) Charles Walker Clark (half-brother)

Huguette Marcelle Clark /uːɡɛt klɑːrk/ (June 9, 1906 – May 24, 2011) was an American painter, heiress, and philanthropist. She became well known again late in life as a recluse, living in hospitals for more than 20 years while her various mansions remained unoccupied.

The youngest daughter of Montana senator and industrialist William A. Clark, she spent her early life in Paris before moving with her family to New York City, where she was educated at the Spence School. After a short-lived marriage ended in 1930, Clark returned to her residence at 907 Fifth Avenue, a large twelfth-floor apartment that she expanded to occupying two floors. She also meticulously maintained Bellosguardo, a large familial estate in Santa Barbara, California, although she never returned to the property after the 1950s.

Clark spent much of her life outside of the public sphere, devoting her time to painting, the arts, and collecting various antiquities, primarily toys and dolls. In 1952, she purchased a property in New Canaan, Connecticut. She became increasingly reclusive after the death of her mother in 1963.

In 1991, she was admitted to Doctors Hospital in Manhattan to treat various basal cell cancer lesions on her face. Though she recovered, Clark remained a hospital resident for the following two decades.

Upon her death at 104 in 2011, Clark left behind a fortune of more than $300 million, most of which was donated to charity after a court dispute with her distant relatives.

The events surrounding her estate and last years of her life were covered extensively by Pulitzer Prize-winning investigative reporter Bill Dedman, who co-wrote a biography in 2013, Empty Mansions: The Mysterious Life of Huguette Clark and the Spending of a Great American Fortune. The film rights to Empty Mansions were optioned by Fremantle, which is developing a TV series with HBO, director Joe Wright, and screenwriter Ido Fluk. The book was optioned earlier by film and television director Ryan Murphy.

== Biography ==
=== 1906–1926: Early life and family ===
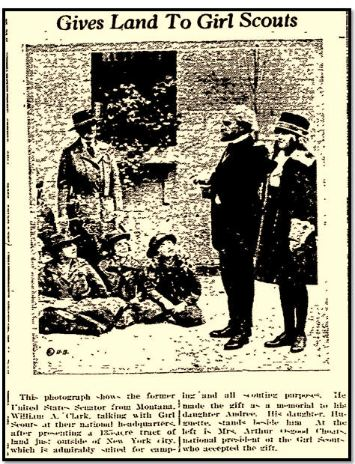
Clark (right) with her father in November 1920 as he donated 135 acres to the Girl Scouts, which was named Camp Andree Clark, after his daughter Andrée.

Huguette Marcelle Clark was born on June 9, 1906, in Paris, France. She was the second daughter of William A. Clark (1839–1925), from his second wife, Anna E. Clark (née LaChapelle; 1878–1963). Her father was a former U.S. Senator from Montana and businessman involved in mining and railroads, who had largely amassed a fortune in copper mining operations in Butte, Montana, and Jerome, Arizona. He was also a railroad magnate and one of the founders of Las Vegas. Her mother, the daughter of French-Canadian immigrants, was born and raised in Michigan, and was an aspiring singer and musician. Although the 2013 biography Empty Mansions stated that Anna and William met while Anna was living in a boarding house in Butte, contemporary newspaper coverage emphasized that Anna had been William's ward: after Anna's father's death, "Senator Clark extended financial assistance to the bereaved family, and finally induced them to allow him to make the girl his ward."

Clark was raised Roman Catholic, the faith of her mother, while her father was a Protestant.

In addition to her older sister, Louise Amelia Andrée Clark (1902–1919), she had five half-siblings from her father's first marriage to Katherine Louise Stauffer: Mary Joaquina Clark (1870–1939), Charles Walker Clark (1871–1933), Katherine Louise Clark (1875–1974), William Andrews Clark, Jr. (1877–1934), and Francis Paul Clark (1880–1896).

Clark spent her early life in France, living with her family at their apartment on Avenue Victor-Hugo in the 16th arrondissement. When she was five years old, she moved to New York City, where she was educated at the Spence School in Manhattan. The family lived in a six-story, 121-room mansion at 962 Fifth Avenue, the largest house in New York City at the time. After her father died in 1925, Clark and her mother moved from the mansion to a twelfth-floor apartment at 907 Fifth Avenue.

=== 1927–1987: Real estate and artistic endeavors ===
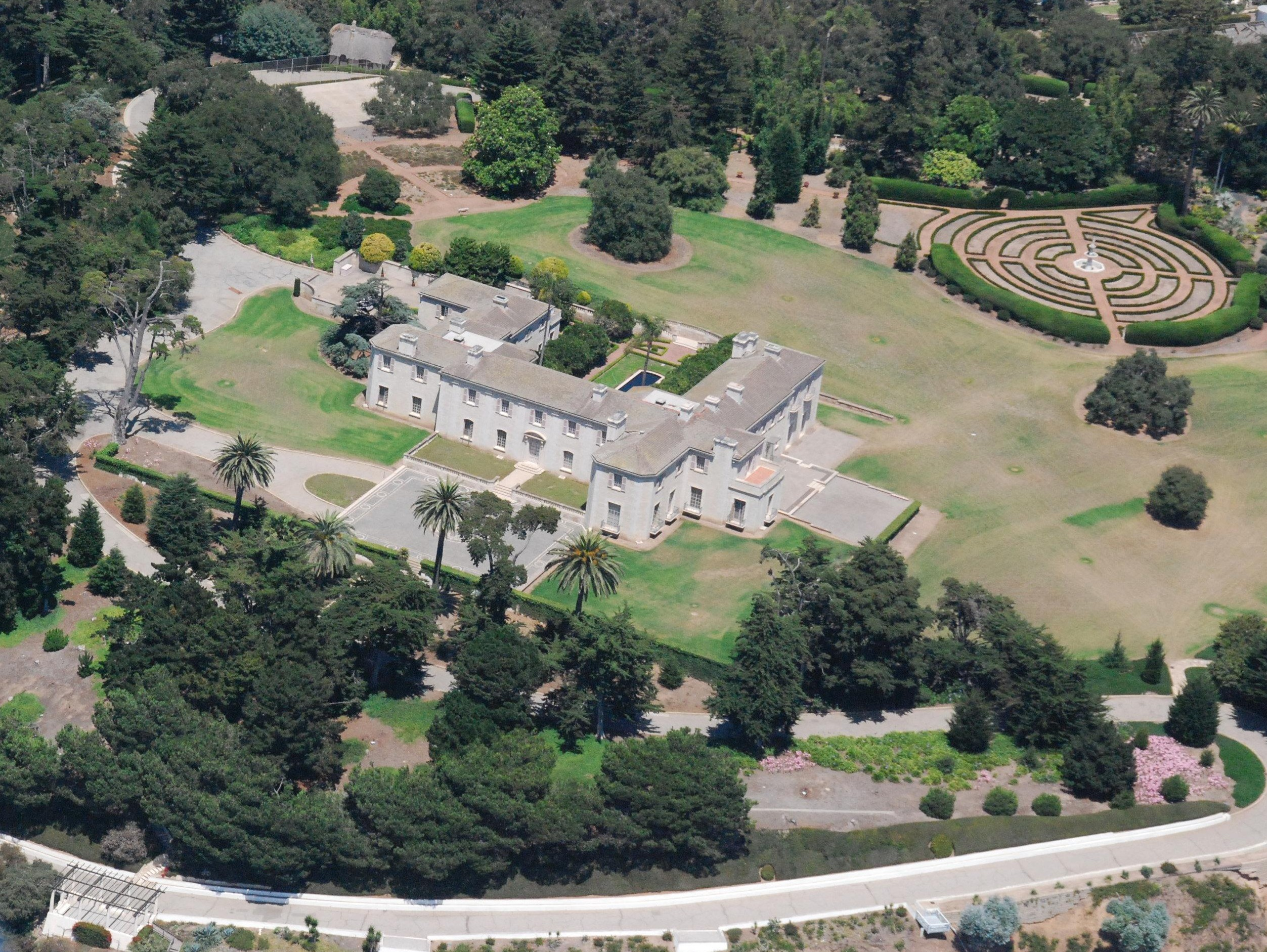
Bellosguardo estate in Santa Barbara, California

In December 1927, Clark announced her engagement to law student William MacDonald Gower, a Princeton University graduate who was a son of one of her father's business associates, William B. Gower. The two married on August 18, 1928, at Bellosguardo, her family's 23-acre (93,000 m^{2}; 9.3 ha) estate on the Pacific Coast in Santa Barbara, California. The same year, Clark agreed to donate $50,000 (equivalent to $938,000 in today's dollars) to excavate a salt pond and create an artificial freshwater lake across from Bellosguardo. She stipulated that the facility would be named the Andrée Clark Bird Refuge, after her sister, who had died of meningitis. Clark and Gower separated in 1929, one year after their marriage, and divorced in Reno, Nevada, on August 11, 1930.

After her divorce, Clark returned to the twelfth-floor apartment at 907 Fifth Avenue, where she had previously lived with her mother. Upon her return, Clark modified and expanded the apartment, so that it took up the entire eighth floor of the building, as well as half of the twelfth. The residence grew to a total of 42 rooms, including a 30-foot (9.1 m) library, 40-foot (12 m) drawing room, and 40-foot (12 m) living room.

According to architectural historian Andrew Alpern: "If you stood with your back to the fireplace in the library, you could see out to Central Park through the living room window that is almost 110 feet (34 m) away!" Clark and her mother continued to maintain Bellosguardo, and during the Great Depression had the original home torn down and rebuilt "just to give people jobs." Clark visited Bellosguardo regularly during this period, staying there with family and friends. There, she befriended Barbara Dorn, the daughter of one of the property's caretakers. An acquaintance recalled that Clark "hung out with rich daredevils who drove fast cars and flew rickety planes," but became close friends with Dorn, as both were shy and "hid in the garden."

Clark was also a musician and painter, and in 1929 exhibited seven of her own paintings at the Corcoran Gallery of Art in Washington, D.C. She possessed an enthusiasm for the arts and was an avid collector of visual art, as well as antique toys and dolls. She reportedly had a very small group of friends and was "skittish around strangers," spending much of her time in private, rarely leaving her residence. She occasionally attended Christian Dior fashion shows in New York City, but only to find inspiration for clothing to dress her dolls.

In 1952, she purchased a 52-acre (210,000 m^{2}; 21 ha) estate in New Canaan, Connecticut, referred to as Le Beau Chateau. After the death of her mother in 1963, she became even more reclusive. Her mother's death left Clark the sole owner of Bellosguardo. Although she never visited the estate after the 1950s, she continued to maintain it at a cost of $40,000 per month.

=== 1988–2009: Hospitalization and later life ===
As she aged, Clark began to develop a distrust of outsiders, including her family, because she worried they were after her money. She preferred to conduct all of her conversations in French so that others were unlikely to understand the discussion. By 1991, Clark had grown frail and had numerous cancerous lesions that disfigured her face, making it difficult for her to see or eat. On March 26 that year, she was admitted to the Upper East Side's Doctors Hospital for treatment. Physicians there noted that she was so thin she appeared like "an apparition ... like somebody out of a concentration camp." Clark successfully underwent surgery to remove basal cell tumors from her face, as well as reconstructive surgery to her lips, right cheek, and right eyelid. A nurse initially noted in Clark's chart that she behaved "like a homeless person – no clothes, not in touch with the world, had not seen a doctor for 20 years, and threw everyone out of the room."

After her treatment, Clark remained a resident of the hospital for the rest of her life, transferring to Beth Israel Medical Center after it merged with Doctors. Her doctor, Henry Singman, "had strongly urged that she go home," but Clark was "perfectly happy, content, to remain in the situation she was in." She had regular visitation from private nurses and medical staff throughout the day and was provided meals in the hospital, where her 11th-floor room overlooked Central Park. Clark paid a daily sum of $829 to stay in the hospital. There, hospital officials recalled her eccentric interests, noting that she would often change conversational topics to cartoons such as The Smurfs and The Flintstones.

Throughout her nearly two-decade stay, Clark became very close with her private nurse, Hadassah Peri. Over the years, Clark gave Peri and her family over $30 million in various properties, vehicles, medical expenses, cash gifts, and college tuitions. A neurologist visited Clark in 2006, and noted that she was "alert and cheerful, neurologically normal in every way ... She seemed cute as pie, perfectly content." While Clark had a net worth of over $300 million, she was cash-poor in her later life, selling properties in order to give large gifts to both friends and strangers—$10 million to her best friend, and $25,000 to hospital workers who once fixed the television in her room.

=== 2010–2011: Final years and media attention ===
In February 2010, Clark became the subject of a series of reports by Bill Dedman, an investigative reporter for NBC News. Dedman found that caretakers at her three residences had not seen her in decades, and that her palatial estates in Santa Barbara and New Canaan, Connecticut, had lain empty throughout that time, although the houses and their extensive grounds were meticulously maintained by their staff. He determined in 2010 that she was in the care of a New York City hospital, and that some of her personal possessions had been quietly sold. Some of the possessions sold include a rare 1709 violin called La Pucelle (or The Virgin) made by Antonio Stradivari, and an 1882 Pierre-Auguste Renoir painting entitled In the Roses.

In August 2010, the office of the New York County District Attorney began a probe into her affairs managed by her accountant, Irving Kamsler, and her attorney, Wallace Bock. A former paralegal for Bock's law firm, Cynthia Garcia, said that Bock received many lavish gifts from Clark, including a $1.5-million gift after the September 11 attacks in 2001, to build a bomb shelter in an Israeli settlement in the West Bank near the homes of his daughters. According to Garcia, Bock tried many times to get Clark to sign a will, including versions that included him as a beneficiary. Bock's spokesperson acknowledged that she had a will. In September 2010, in a one-paragraph ruling, Judge Laura Visitacion-Lewis turned down a request from a grand-half-nephew and two grand-half-nieces – Ian Devine, Carla Hall Friedman and Karine McCall – to appoint an independent guardian to manage Clark's affairs.

== Death ==
Clark died on May 24, 2011, at Beth Israel Medical Center in New York City, two weeks short of her 105th birthday. She had been moved a month earlier to an intensive-care unit and later to a room with hospice care; at the time of her death, Peri was by her side. Though Clark had long said she did not want a funeral or priests, a Catholic priest was summoned to give her last rites.

During this time, Clark had been living at Beth Israel under pseudonyms; the latest was Harriet Chase. Her room was guarded and she was cared for by part-time private nurses. Her room on the third floor had a card with the fake room number "1B" with the name "Chase" taped over the actual room number. A criminal investigation into the handling of her money was ongoing at the time of her death.

She was entombed on the morning of May 26, 2011, in the family mausoleum in section 85 of Woodlawn Cemetery, in The Bronx, New York City, before the cemetery gates were open to the public. Her attorney said she had specific instructions that no funeral service or Mass be held. In 2008, Clark's representatives obtained consent from other Clark family members to alter the mausoleum originally commissioned by her father. It was not until early 2011 that the mausoleum was altered to accommodate her entombment.

== Posthumous events ==
=== Estate settlement ===
Clark's last will and testament was filed on June 22, 2011, in New York Surrogate's Court. This will was made in 2005 and left seventy-five percent of her estate, about $300 million, to charity. The will provided that her longtime nurse, Hadassah Peri, would receive about $30 million; her goddaughter, Wanda Styka, would receive about $12 million; and the newly created Bellosguardo Foundation would get $8 million. Other employees who managed her residences and affairs would receive smaller sums totaling $2 million, while Beth Israel Hospital, where she resided for many years and where she died, received $1 million. Her attorney and accountant would receive $500,000 each. A Claude Monet painting, part of his series of 250 oil paintings known as the Water Lilies (Nymphéas), was bequeathed to the Corcoran Museum of Art; she had purchased the 1907 painting from Galerie Durand-Ruel in 1930. The will described Clark as a "reluctant heiress" who "possessed a large heart as well as a deep devotion to the arts." A portion of the will reads:

Given the world we inhabit today, it's hard for most of us to comprehend the choices Mrs. Clark made to sequester herself from all the trappings of wealth. The Will we have filed today is consistent with the way she chose to live her life – a person who knew what she owned, who cherished her privacy and intimate kinship, and who knew that this Will would be a statement of her love of the fine arts and her Santa Barbara home, and her attachment to those special people.

In October 2011, NBC News reported that an earlier will was signed six weeks before the second will; this earlier will left Clark's estate entirely to her family. A total of nineteen distant relatives of Clark—the last of whom saw her in 1957, and many of whom never met her—subsequently challenged the second will, citing her "obsession with high end, lifelike French and Japanese dolls, model castles, the Smurfs, her reclusiveness and tendency to give her money freely as evidence of mental illness." They also accused Peri, as well as her attorney and accountant, of defrauding her. While no one was charged with a crime, the accusations resulted in an investigation by the district attorney's office, who mandated that the will be settled before a jury trial.

On September 24, 2013, Clark's will was finally settled, with the majority of the distant relatives receiving a total sum of $34.5 million. Peri received nothing and agreed to return $5 million of the earlier $31 million in gifts made to her and her family. The bulk of the substantial remainder went to the arts, including the gift of her estate in Santa Barbara to a new foundation, called the Bellosguardo Foundation.

=== Reported theft of artwork ===
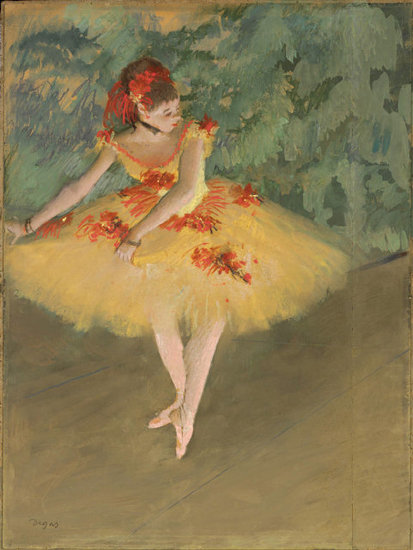
Danseuse Faisant des Pointes (1879–1880), a pastel drawing by Edgar Degas, was stolen from Clark's Fifth Avenue apartment

In March 2012, it was reported that shortly after Clark moved to a hospital in the early 1990s, a valuable pastel, Danseuse Faisant des Pointes (Dancer Making Pointes), by Edgar Degas, was stolen from her Fifth Avenue apartment. The painting was sold to Peter Findlay Gallery and later acquired in 1993 by H&R Block co-founder and art collector Henry W. Bloch. The Peter Findlay Gallery indicated that it acquired the piece from a "European gentleman, seemingly from a good family, who visited New York from time to time" and who claimed to have inherited the work. It was not until 2005 that the Federal Bureau of Investigation made Bloch aware that it was investigating the painting, and in 2007, they told Bloch that the painting had in fact been reported stolen from Clark.

Under an October 2008 deed of gift, Clark agreed to donate the pastel, valued at $10 million, to the Nelson-Atkins Museum of Art in Kansas City, Missouri, of which Bloch was a major benefactor. After making the gift, Clark made a request that the pastel be lent three times in 25 years to the Corcoran Museum of Art, that it be listed as from an anonymous donor, and that Clark personally receive a full-sized color photograph of the work. The museum kept the matter confidential, acknowledging ownership in a 2012 written exchange with NBC News.

=== Sale of residences and personal items ===
After her death, seventeen items from her personal jewel collection were auctioned off at Christie's on April 17, 2012. Buyers paid a total of over $20 million for the items, including a rare nine-carat pink diamond by Dreicer & Company that was purchased for over $15.7 million, which included a buyer's premium of 12 percent. The bulk of Clark's collection of art and antiquities were consigned to go on the auction block at Christie's in June 2014, over three years after her death.

In July 2012, one of Clark's three 907 Fifth Avenue apartments, the penthouse #12W, sold for a pre-emptive $25.5 million, $1.5 million above the listing price, to Boaz Weinstein, the hedge fund manager and founder of Saba Capital Management, which was the biggest sale of the week according to city records.

The Prime Minister of Qatar attempted to purchase both of Clark's apartments on the eighth floor, which comprised the entire eighth floor, and combine the two into one huge apartment. However, the building's board did not allow it. In November 2012, apartment #8W was sold for $22.5 million to financier Frederick Iseman. The unit was listed for $19 million, but the sale includes a piece of unit #8E, which was later sold in October 2013 for $6.8 million to David Luski, president and chief executive officer at DRA Advisors LLC, after originally being listed for $12 million. In total, the three apartments sold for a combined $54.8 million.

In April 2014, after sitting empty for more than 60 years, Clark's French-style chateau known as "Le Beau Chateau", which sits on 52 wooded acres in New Canaan, Connecticut, was sold to the fashion designer Reed Krakoff and his wife. They purchased the home for the reduced price of $14.3 million.

== See also ==
- List of American women artists
- List of painters
- List of people from New York City
- List of philanthropists

== Works cited ==
- Dedman, Bill; Newell, Paul Clark Jr. (2014). Empty Mansions: The Mysterious Life of Huguette Clark and the Spending of a Great American Fortune. New York: Ballantine Books. ISBN 978-0-345-53453-8.
- Wildenstein, Daniel (1999). Monet – or a Triumph of Impressionism. A Monet catalogue raisonné. Cologne, Germany: Taschen. ISBN 978-3-8228-8559-8.
