= Edith Macy Conference Center =

Conference and training facility of the Girl Scouts of the USA

Coordinates: 41.1600°N 73.8074°W

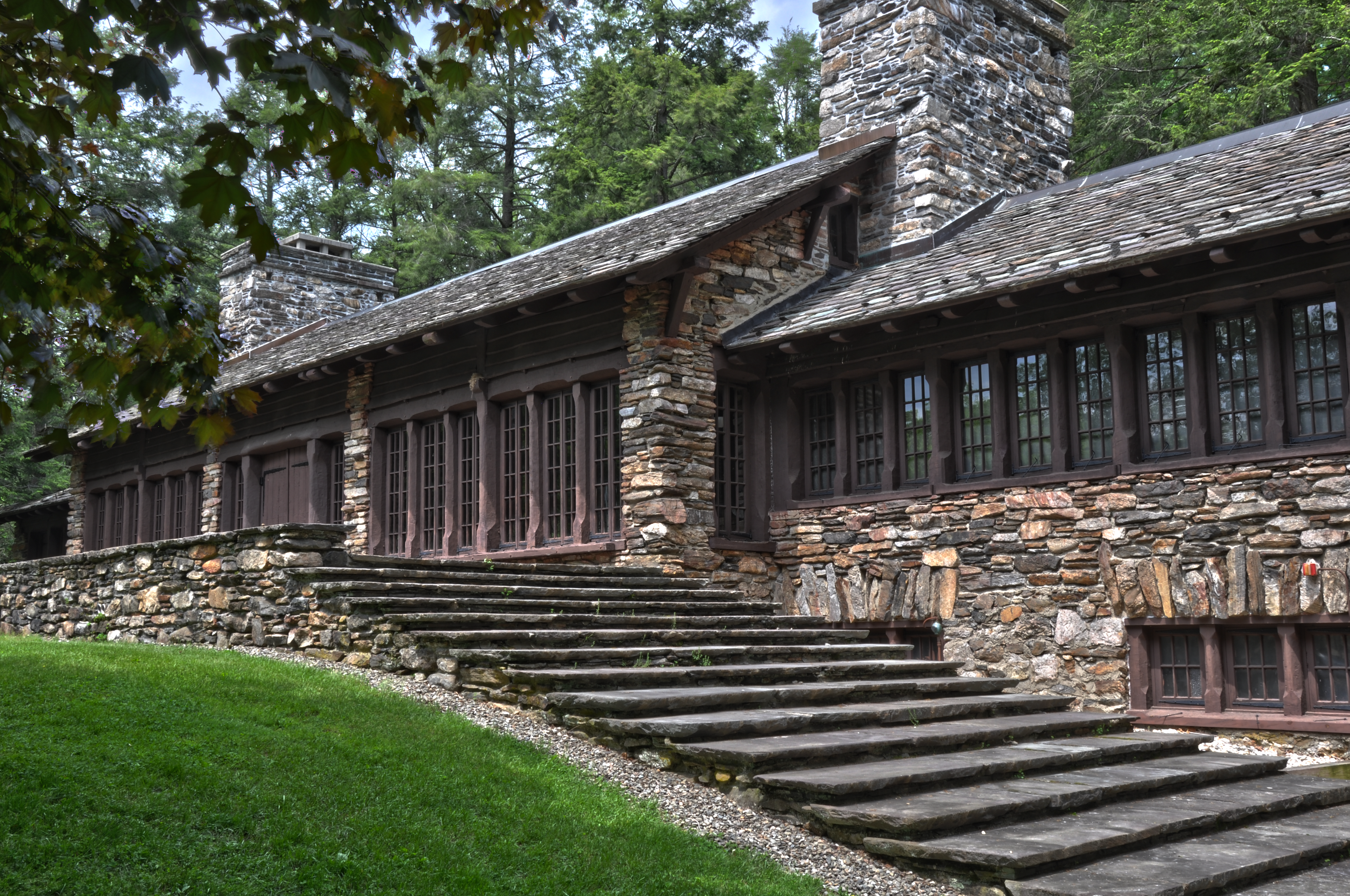
- The old Edith Macy training facility
- Owner: Girl Scouts of the USA
- Location: Briarcliff Manor, New York
- Country: United States
- Founded: 1926
- Founder: V. Everit Macy

Edith Macy Conference Center is a conference and training facility owned by the Girl Scouts of the USA (GSUSA) and is located in Briarcliff Manor, New York. The facility lies just outside Briarcliff Manor's boundaries, in the town of Mount Pleasant. The site has had four names: Camp Edith Macy (C.E.M.) - University In The Woods, Edith Macy Training School, Edith Macy Girl Scout National Center and since 1982, Edith Macy Conference Center. However, it is often simply referred to as Macy. The John J. Creedon Education Center and Camp Andrée Clark are part of the complex. In 1926, Macy hosted the Girl Guides and Girl Scouts Fourth International Conference.

== History ==
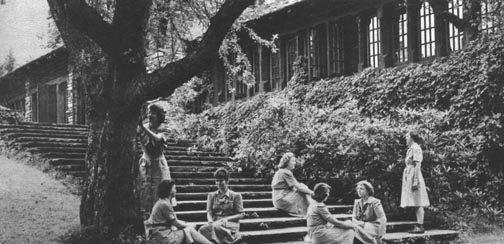
The training center, c. 1950s

Edith Macy was the chair of the Girl Scout National Board of Directors from 1919 to 1925 and dreamed of a permanent Girl Scout training center. In 1925, V. Everit Macy donated land to be used as a national training school in memory of his wife, who had died on February 1 that year. Camp Edith Macy (C.E.M.) -- University In The Woods opened in May 1926 with approximately 25 adult members. Later that year, the fourth World Conference of the Girl Guiding and Girl Scouting Movement (where World Thinking Day was created) was held there.

The school was known as the Edith Macy Training School around the 1950s, where educational courses included Girl Scout administration, outdoor skills, arts and crafts with related field work, and world friendship. Further on the facility became known as the Edith Macy Girl Scout National Center. Work on the conference center started in 1980 and Edith Macy Conference Center was opened in 1982, with a 200-seat amphitheater. The facility is open to all organizations.

== Location ==
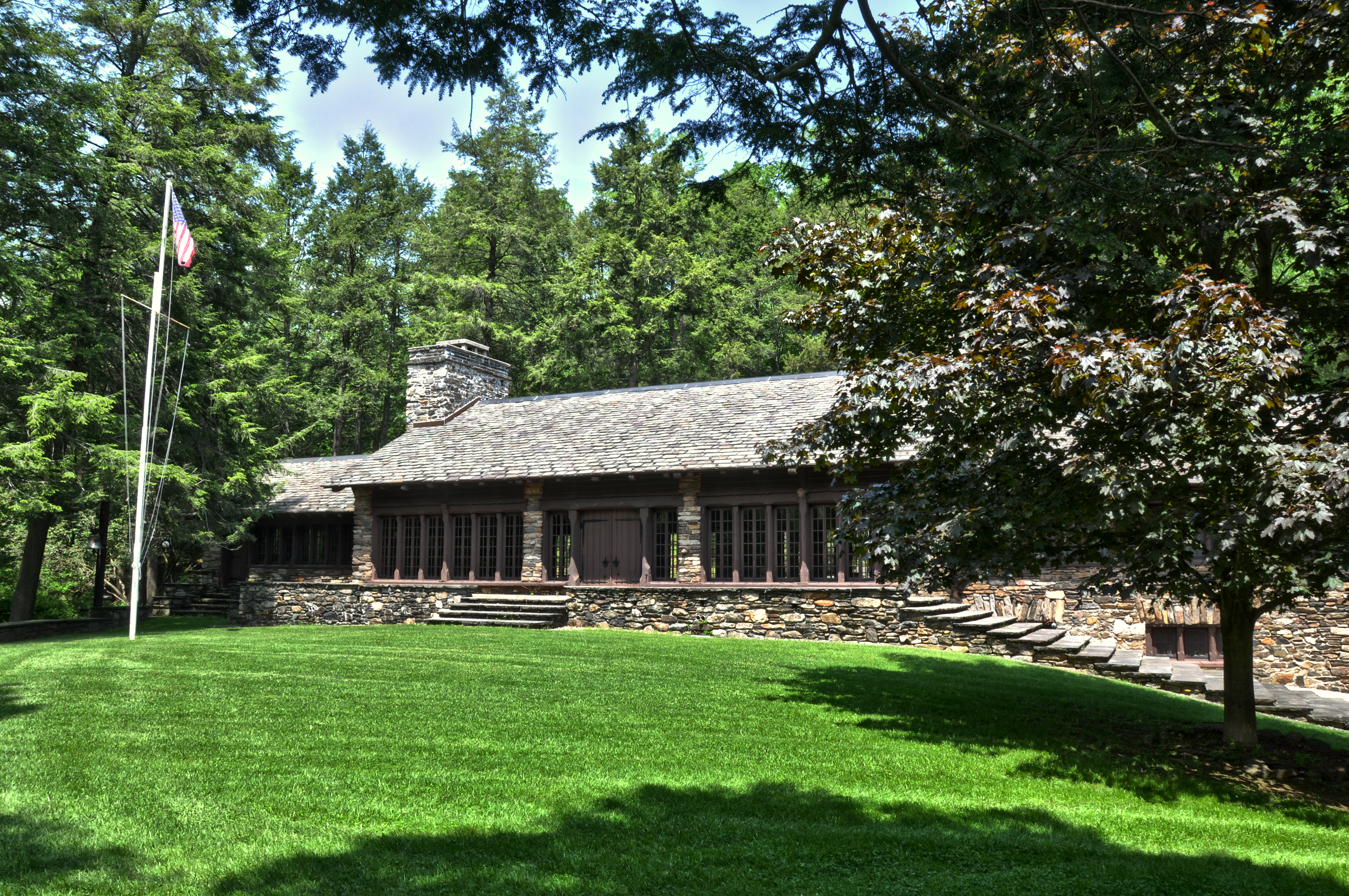
The old training facility

Edith Macy Conference Center consists of 265 acres (1.07 km^{2}) of woodlands and meadows with a variety of terrain. Girl Scout leaders have identified 51 kinds of trees, 15 kinds of ferns, 87 bird species, and over 200 varieties of flowers in the area.

== Camp Andrée Clark ==
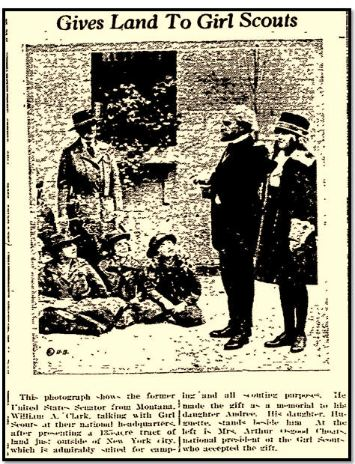
William A. Clark donates 135 acres to the Girl Scouts, November 26, 1920. His daughter Huguette is at right.

Camp Andrée Clark is operated by the G. S. Council of Greater New York, and has 140 acres (0.57 km^{2}) used by 1,000 Girl Scouts each year. Facilities at Camp Andrée Clark are for use by Girl Scout groups only, unlike the other facilities as part of the Macy complex. There are two winterized cabins, The Lin House and The Friedsam House for groups to stay in. There is a picnic area, hiking trails and a small lake called Kinderaugen (German: children's eyes), which was named for the laughing blue eyes of children.

The site of Camp Andrée Clark was donated in 1920 by former Senator and Mrs. William A. Clark in memory of their daughter, Louise Amelia Andrée Clark, who had been an enthusiastic Girl Scout until her death from meningitis one week before her 17th birthday in 1919. The camp opened two years later, in 1921, as a national camp. In 1937, an international camp was held at Camp Andrée Clark to celebrate the Silver Jubilee of GSUSA. Girls from 26 countries attended.

The First Juliette Low Western Hemisphere Encampment was held August 14–28, 1940 at Camp Andrée Clark. Thirteen countries and colonies from the Western Hemisphere were represented by a total of 22 Girl Scouts and Girl Guides. Only one other Juliette Low Western Hemisphere Encampment was held.

== John J. Creedon Education Center ==
Girl Scout Outdoor Education Center, a national training laboratory in outdoor education, opened in January 1988. In October 1988, its name changed to John J. Creedon Camp of Tomorrow. It is now called John J. Creedon Education Center. It is a group of five buildings. It has a meeting space, dining facility, a recreation center and accommodation.

== See also ==
- Foxlease
- Philmont Scout Ranch
- Scouting in New York
