= Bill Dedman =

American journalist

- Born: Chattanooga, Tennessee, U.S.
- Education: Baylor School, Chattanooga; Washington University in St. Louis (no degree)
- Occupations: Journalist, author
- Awards: Pulitzer Prize for Investigative Reporting; Peabody Award; George Polk Award; Edward R. Murrow Award; Investigative Reporters and Editors Award; National Press Club Award; Sigma Delta Chi Award; Worth Bingham Prize; Robert F. Kennedy Journalism Award
- Website: Power Reporting; Empty Mansions book

Bill Dedman is an American investigative reporter and author. He is best known for The Color of Money, his 1988 investigation of redlining of middle-income black neighborhoods by banks and other mortgage lenders. Dedman received the 1989 Pulitzer Prize for Investigative Reporting for his articles in The Atlanta Journal-Constitution.

Dedman is the co-author of the biography of reclusive heiress Huguette Clark and her family, Empty Mansions: The Mysterious Life of Huguette Clark and the Spending of a Great American Fortune, which was number one on The New York Times bestseller list and is being adapted into a television series for HBO.

Often relying on public records more than insider accounts, Dedman has reported and written influential investigative articles on racial profiling by police, illegal steering of customers to different neighborhoods by real estate agents based on the race of the customers, police officers who tried to stop abusive interrogations of detainees at the Guantanamo Bay detention camp,, and efforts to understand and prevent school shootings. His work includes one of the early examinations, in 1990, of the cover-up by the Roman Catholic Church of allegations of sexual abuse of minors by a priest.

== The Color of Money ==
In 1989, Dedman received the Pulitzer Prize for Investigative Reporting for The Color of Money, his series of articles in 1988 in editor Bill Kovach's The Atlanta Journal-Constitution on racial discrimination by banks and other mortgage lenders in middle-income black neighborhoods. The first stories in The Color of Money, published May 1–4, 1988, disclosed that Atlanta's banks and savings and loans, although they had made loans for years in even the poorest white neighborhoods of Atlanta, did not lend in middle-class or more affluent black neighborhoods. More than 60 articles followed. The focus moved to lenders across the nation with Dedman's January 1989 article, "Blacks turned down for home loans from S&Ls twice as often as whites."

As the Pulitzer committee wrote, Dedman's reporting "led to significant reforms.". In addition to raising awareness of redlining of minority areas, and leading Congress to expand disclosure of data allowing analysis of racial patterns in mortgage data, The Color of Money was an influential early example of computer-assisted reporting, now known more often as data journalism or data-driven journalism.

Prompted by The Color of Money, Congress expanded the federal Home Mortgage Disclosure Act to provide more information to the public on the pattern of activity by all mortgage lenders. The group Investigative Reporters and Editors published a guide for journalists on using HMDA data to analyze lending patterns.

The U.S. Justice Department responded to The Color of Money by focusing greater attention on unequal lending, suing a large savings and loan association in United States v. Decatur Federal Savings & Loan. In the first major case alleging a pattern or practice of racial discrimination in mortgage lending in the United States, the federal government alleged that Decatur Federal applied stricter underwriting standards to African-American applicants than to white applicants and devised ways to avoid dealing with African-Americans. In a consent decree, the bank agreed to pay $1 million to compensate 48 victims of discrimination and to take a series of corrective measures to ensure compliance with federal fair lending laws.

Banking regulators increased pressure on lenders to comply with the guidelines of the Community Reinvestment Act, which encourages deposit-holding financial institutions to make loans throughout their service areas. For the first time, regulators in 1989 denied an application for a bank merger on the grounds of poor performance under the Community Reinvestment Act.

Along with responses from lawmakers and regulators, Atlanta's largest banks agreed to lend $65 million at low rates to moderate-income borrowers, particularly on the city's black Southside.

== Life and career ==
Born in Chattanooga, Tennessee, Dedman grew up in neighboring Red Bank, Tennessee, and graduated from the Baylor School. He started in journalism at age 16 as a copy boy at the Chattanooga Times.

He attended Washington University in St. Louis, writing for the student newspaper Student Life and editing part-time for the St. Louis Post-Dispatch, but dropped out of college to work as the reporter at The Daily Star-Journal in Warrensburg, Missouri.

Dedman was a reporter for the Knoxville News Sentinel, The Atlanta Journal-Constitution, The Washington Post, and The Boston Globe. He was the first director of computer-assisted reporting for The Associated Press. He has covered news and sports part-time for The New York Times, including the home run record chase between Mark McGwire and Sammy Sosa in 1998 and 1999.

From 2006 to 2014, Dedman was an investigative reporter for NBC News and NBCNews.com, formerly known as msnbc.com, uncovering stories including firefighter deaths from faulty equipment, fraud in Pentagon efforts to identify war dead, widespread failures to inspect highway bridges, efforts by U.S. officials to hide the risk of earthquake damage to nuclear power plants, hidden visitor logs at the Obama White House, suppression of Hillary Rodham Clinton's college thesis at the request of the Clinton White House, and journalists making campaign contributions.

In 2014 he joined Newsday, the daily newspaper on Long Island, N.Y., as a senior writer, reporting investigative stories in print, online, and on television for Newsday and its sister cable television channel, News 12 Long Island. He was one of the four lead reporters on Newsday's 2019 undercover investigation of illegal racial steering by real estate agents, Long Island Divided. The investigation revealed that Long Island’s dominant residential real estate brokerages help solidify racial segregation. Realtors frequently directed white customers toward white areas, while directing minority buyers toward more integrated neighborhoods. They also avoided doing any business in communities with large minority populations.

Although not a college graduate, Dedman taught advanced reporting as an adjunct lecturer at Boston University, Northwestern University, the University of Maryland, and Stony Brook University, and served for six years on the board of directors of the association Investigative Reporters and Editors.

Dedman's investigative reporting is analyzed at length in two books: Custodians of Conscience, which examines the techniques and moral implications of investigative reporting, and the textbook The Ethical Journalist: Making Responsible Decisions in the Digital Age..

In addition to serious investigative reporting, Dedman has done quirky stories, including his account in The Washington Post of discovering the 1989 DC Prostitute Expulsion, when police officers attempted to force sex workers to march down 14th Street, past the Washington Monument and across the 14th Street Bridge toward Virginia.

== Empty Mansions and Huguette Clark ==
While working for NBC News as an investigative reporter, Dedman uncovered the case of the reclusive copper heiress Huguette Clark. He documented her life in a series of reports on NBCNews.com and The Today Show in 2010-2012. Dedman reported the Clark mystery first in an online slideshow, a series of 47 photos with 2,788 accompanying words in captions. The slideshow attracted more than 75 million page views, more than any story in the website's history.

Dedman and Clark's cousin, Paul Clark Newell, Jr. (1936–2016), co-wrote the 2013 nonfiction book Empty Mansions about Clark and her father, the Gilded Age industrialist William A. Clark.

Published September 10, 2013, by Ballantine Books, Empty Mansions debuted at number one on The New York Times bestseller list for e-books and number four for hardcover books for the week ending September 14, 2013. It was on the New York Times bestseller list for 13 weeks and the Los Angeles Times bestseller list for 37 weeks. Empty Mansions also appeared on bestseller lists from Publishers Weekly, IndieBound independent booksellers, National Public Radio, The Wall Street Journal, USA Today and Maclean's magazine in Canada. Empty Mansions has been published in translation in China, Brazil, and Italy, and in English in the U.S., Canada, the United Kingdom, and Commonwealth countries.

The film rights to Empty Mansions were optioned by Fremantle, which is developing a TV series with HBO, director Joe Wright, and screenwriter Ido Fluk. The book was optioned earlier by film and television director Ryan Murphy.

== Awards ==
Dedman has received the Pulitzer Prize for Investigative Reporting, the Investigative Reporters and Editors Award; the Worth Bingham Prize for national investigative reporting, the Robert F. Kennedy Journalism Award grand prize, the Society of Professional Journalists' Sigma Delta Chi Award, and awards from the National Press Club, Society for Advancing Business Editing and Writing, Society for News Design, and others. For the investigation Long Island Divided, his team at Newsday received The Peabody Award, the Edward R. Murrow Award, the George Polk Award in Journalism, the Sigma Delta Chi Award, an award from the News Leaders Association, and others.
