= Empty Mansions =

2013 book by Bill Dedman and Paul Clark Newell, Jr.

Empty Mansions: The Mysterious Life of Huguette Clark and the Spending of a Great American Fortune
- First edition
- Author: Bill Dedman and Paul Clark Newell, Jr.
- Language: English
- Genre: Nonfiction/Biography
- Publisher: Ballantine Books
- Publication date: September 10, 2013
- Publication place: United States
- Media type: Print (Hardback and Paperback), e-book, audio-CD
- Pages: 496 pp (Hardcover)
- ISBN: 978-0345534521 (Hardcover)
- Website: Empty Mansions, by Bill Dedman and Paul Clark Newell, Jr. | Official Website

Empty Mansions: The Mysterious Life of Huguette Clark and the Spending of a Great American Fortune is a non-fiction book by the American authors Bill Dedman and Paul Clark Newell, Jr., about the heiress Huguette Clark (1906–2011), daughter of the copper baron and United States Senator William A. Clark (1839–1925), one of the wealthiest men in the world at the time. The book chronicles the Clark family's involvement across much of American history, from a log cabin in Pennsylvania to mining camps during the Montana gold rush.

Empty Mansions debuted at number one on The New York Times bestseller list for e-books and number four for hardcover books for the week ending September 14, 2013. It was on the New York Times bestseller list for 13 weeks and the Los Angeles Times bestseller list for 37 weeks. Empty Mansions also appeared on bestseller lists from Publishers Weekly, IndieBound independent booksellers, National Public Radio, The Wall Street Journal, USA Today and Maclean's magazine in Canada.

The film rights to Empty Mansions were optioned by Fremantle, which is developing a TV series with HBO, director Joe Wright, and screenwriter Ido Fluk. The book was optioned earlier by film and television director Ryan Murphy.

== Overview ==
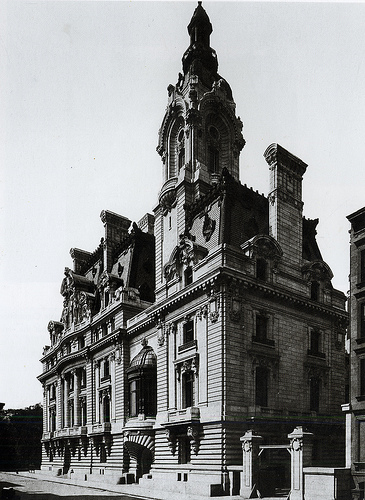
William A. Clark House in New York City

Empty Mansions chronicles the life of Huguette Clark, the daughter of the wealthy copper industrialist William A. Clark. Clark was a controversial senator, builder of railroads, namesake of Clark County, Nevada, and the founder of Las Vegas. Huguette grew up in the William A. Clark House at 962 Fifth Avenue, the largest house in New York City. She owned paintings by Edgar Degas and Renoir, a Stradivarius violin, and a vast collection of antique dolls. During her life, she used her wealth to buy gifts for friends and strangers alike while quietly pursuing her own calling as an artist and guarding the privacy she valued above all else.

The book weaves together Huguette's seemingly charmed life through her personal history including possession of a first-class ticket and stateroom on the second voyage of the Titanic to the anxiety nine decades later of the terror attacks on 9/11. During the last 20 years of her life, Huguette lived in hospitals in New York City despite owning multiple homes and having a fortune worth more than $300 million.

Huguette's intimate circle of family members, including her infamous father and publicity-shy mother; acquaintances like her nurse who received more than $30 million in gifts; and the relatives fighting to inherit Huguette's fortune. The book contains more than seventy photographs, many never before seen outside of the family. Empty Mansions tells the story of a woman who has been described as the "last jewel of the Gilded Age".

== Research ==
In 2009, Pulitzer Prize–winning journalist Bill Dedman was looking at real estate in New Canaan, Connecticut, and came across a listing for an expensive home that had been unoccupied but maintained for nearly sixty years. From there he began research that led him to Huguette Clark and into American history that was still being lived out. After publishing his initial story on NBC.com, Dedman was led to Paul Clark Newell, Jr., Huguette Clark's cousin and one of the few relatives who had any contact with her. Together, Dedman and Newell (1936–2016) collaborated, combining Dedman's findings with years of family research by Newell, telling the tale of a bright, talented woman born into a family of wealth and privilege who voluntarily removes herself from the outside world to live a life of relative seclusion.

== Reviews ==
- "One of those incredible stories that you didn't even know existed. It filled a void." — Jon Stewart, The Daily Show
- "An amazing story of profligate wealth . . . an outsized tale of rags-to-riches prosperity." — The New York Times
- "A fascinating investigation into the haunting true-life tale of reclusive heiress Huguette Clark." — People Magazine
- "An exhaustively researched, well-written account . . . a blood-boiling expose [that] will make you angry and will make you sad." — The Seattle Times
- "An evocative and rollicking read, part social history, part hothouse mystery, part grand guignol." — The Daily Beast
- "A childlike, self-exiled eccentric, [Huguette Clark] is the sort of subject susceptible to a biography of broad strokes, which makes Empty Mansions, the first full-length account of her life, impressive for its delicacy and depth." — Town & Country Magazine
- "A compelling account of what happened to the Clark family and its fortune . . . a tremendous feat." — St. Louis Post-Dispatch
- "Brilliantly researched, tough-minded, and fair . . . a fascinating read." — Santa Barbara Independent
- "Riveting . . . deliciously scandalous . . . a thrilling study of the responsibilities and privileges that come with great wealth." — Publishers Weekly
- "Empty Mansions is a dazzlement and a wonder. Bill Dedman and Paul Newell unravel a great character, Huguette Clark, a shy soul akin to Boo Radley in To Kill a Mockingbird—if Boo's father had been as rich as Rockefeller. This is an enchanting journey into the mysteries of the mind, a true-to-life exploration of strangeness and delight." — Pat Conroy, author of The Death of Santini: The Story of a Father and His Son
- "Empty Mansions is at once an engrossing portrait of a forgotten American heiress and a fascinating meditation on the crosswinds of extreme wealth. Hugely entertaining and well researched, Empty Mansions is a fabulous read." — Amanda Foreman, author of A World on Fire
- "In Empty Mansions, a unique American character emerges from the shadows. Through deep research and evocative writing, Bill Dedman and Paul Clark Newell, Jr., have expertly captured the arc of history covered by the remarkable Clark family, while solving a deeply personal mystery of wealth and eccentricity." — Jon Meacham, author of Thomas Jefferson: The Art of Power
- "Who knew? Though virtually unknown today, W. A. Clark was one of the fifty richest Americans ever—copper baron, railroad builder, art collector, U.S. senator, and world-class scoundrel. Yet his daughter and heiress Huguette became a bizarre recluse. Empty Mansions reveals this mysterious family in sumptuous detail." — John Berendt, author of Midnight in the Garden of Good and Evil
- "Empty Mansions is a mesmerizing tale that delivers all the ingredients of a top-notch mystery novel. But there is nothing fictional about this true, fully researched story of a fascinating and reclusive woman from an era of fabulous American wealth. Empty Mansions is a delicious read—once you start it, you will find it hard to put down." — Kate Alcott, bestselling author of The Dressmaker
- "More than a biography, more than a mystery, Empty Mansions is a real-life American Bleak House, an arresting tale about misplaced souls sketched on a canvas that stretches from coast to coast, from riotous mining camps to the gilded dwellings of the very, very rich." — John A. Farrell, author of Clarence Darrow: Attorney for the Damned

== Translations ==
Originally published in the United States and Canada, Empty Mansions has been translated and published in China, Brazil, and Italy, and also published in English in the United Kingdom and Commonwealth countries.
