= List of historic properties in Clarkdale, Arizona =

- Town
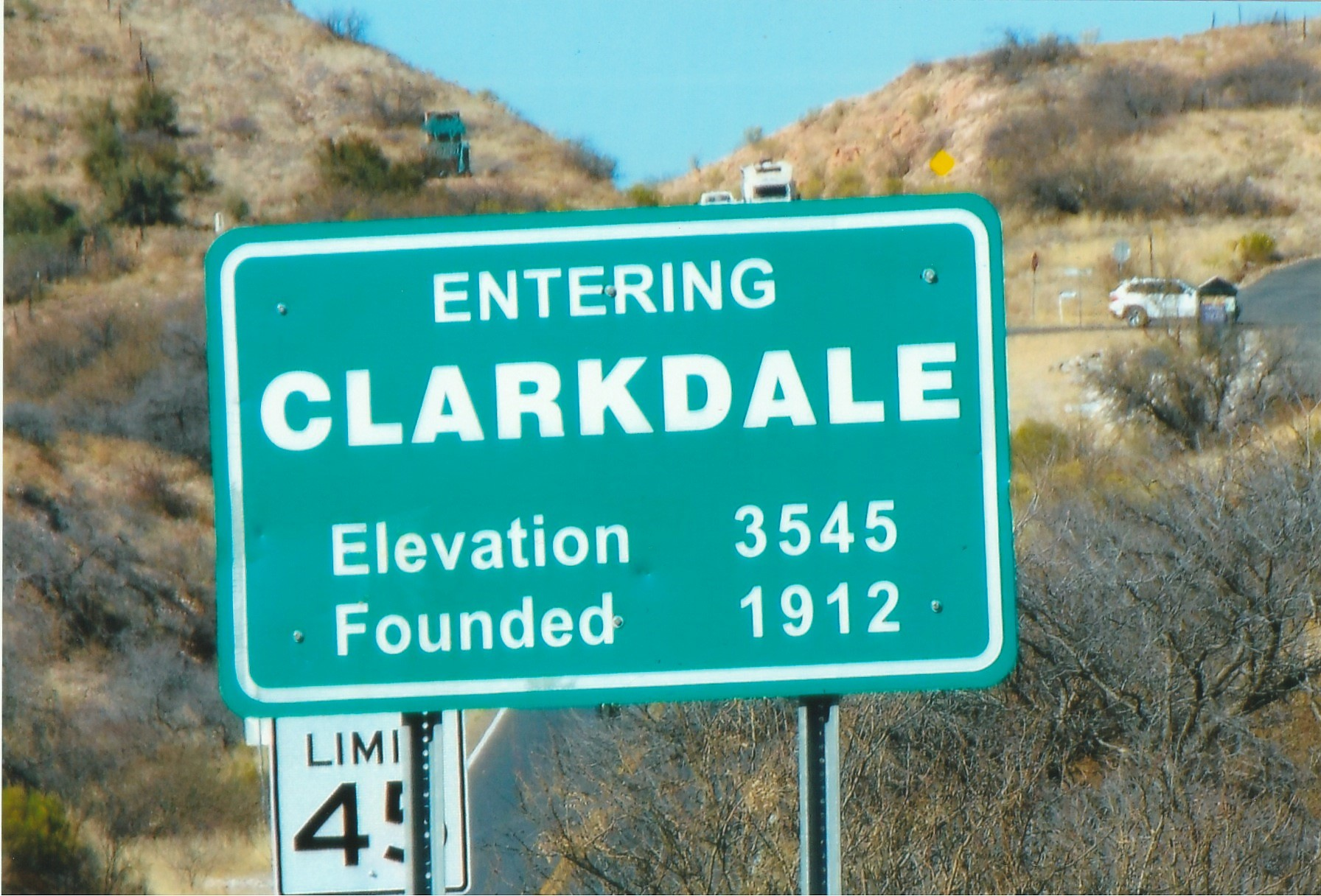
- Welcome to Clarkdale

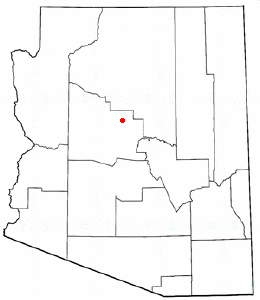
- Location of Clarkdale in Yavapai County, Arizona.

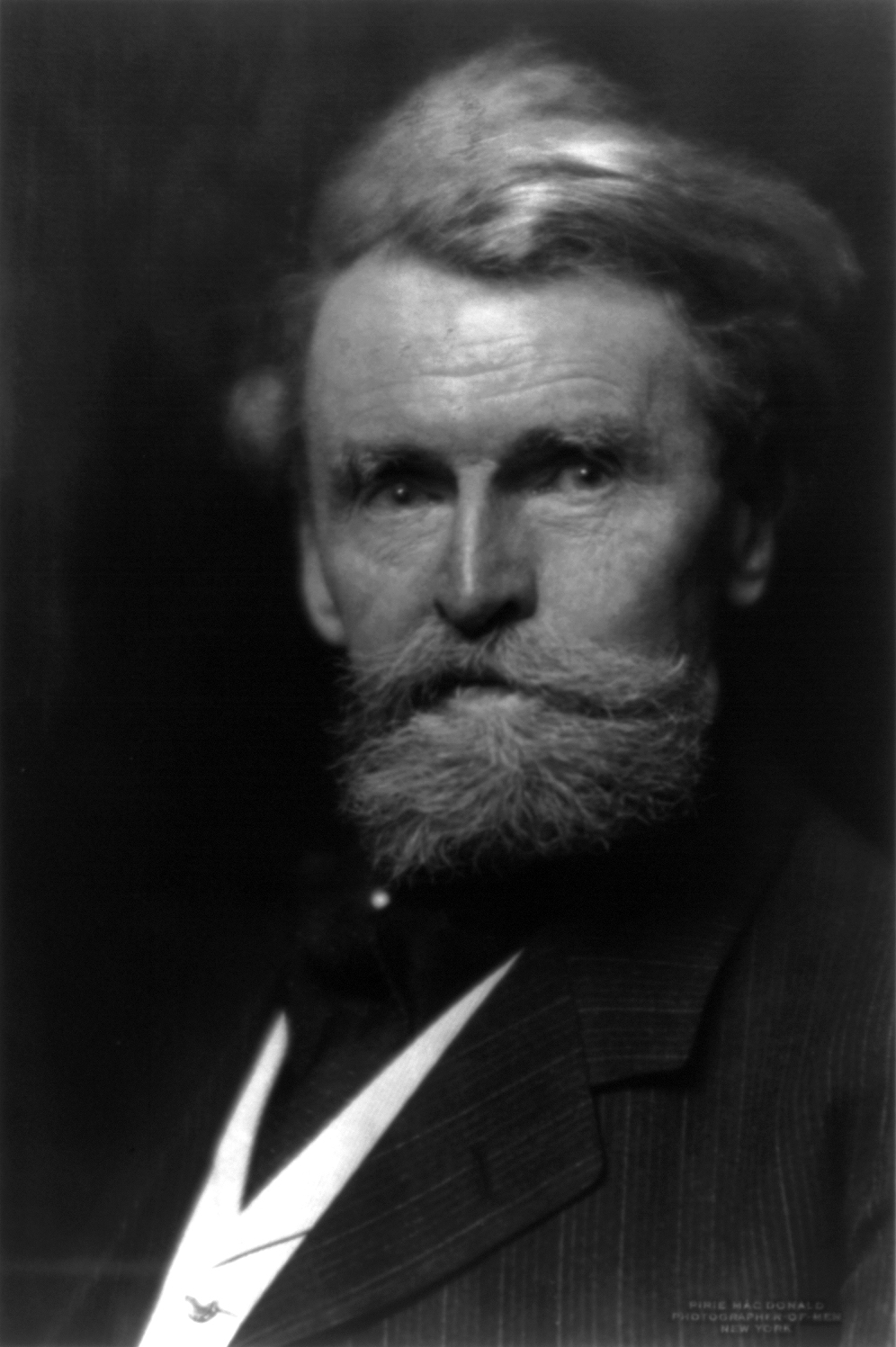
William Andrews Clark Sr.

This is a list, which includes a photographic gallery, of some of the remaining structures and monuments, of historic significance in Clarkdale, a former mining town in Yavapai County, Arizona, United States. Clarkdale was Arizona's first master-planned community. The town is located on the northwest boundary of the City of Cottonwood.

== Brief history ==
During the pre-Columbian era, the area was occupied by Sinagua people who built their dwellings in the cliffs of the Verde Valley Mountains between 1100 and 1425 AD. In 1583, Captain Antonio de Espejo and the Spanish conquistadors took possession of the Verde Valley.

In the 1860s settlers began to migrate into the Verde Valley to work in the mining industry. The United States Army established a minor post overlooking the farms which the settlers established in West Clear Water. A post called Camp Lincoln, which later was renamed Camp Verde, was established.

William Andrews Clark Sr. was born in Connellsville, Pennsylvania. He was a businessman who was involved with mining, banking, and railroads. In 1888, Clark bought the United Verde Copper Company mine in Jerome, Arizona. The mine was located in the Black Hills in the Verde Valley. He decided to move the smelter further down the hill in 1912.

Clark planned and built Arizona's first master-planned community for his employees. The town, which was named Clarkdale, had a population of 3,200 most of which were mine employees and their families. The town not only had residences, but it also had a business district, a hospital, schools, and a town park. By 1930, the United Verde Mining Co. had built 500 houses in Clarkdale

The original Clarkdale town site is recognized as an historic district on the National Register of Historic Places. It was listed as such in 1998, reference #97001586 as the "Clarkdale Historic District". Included are the buildings and residences along Main Street. The Clarkdale Historical Society and Museum is located at 900 First North St.

Clarkdale, however does not have the authority to deny a demolition permit. Therefore, the owner of a property, listed either in the National Register of Historic Places or considered historical by the Clarkdale Historical Society, may demolish the historical property in question if he or she so desires. According to Jim McPherson, Arizona Preservation Foundation Board President: "It is crucial that residents, private interests, and government officials act now to save these elements of our cultural heritage before it is too late.”

== The Clark Mansion ==
Clark's grandson William "Tersius" Clark, built a mansion over Peck's Lake in Clarkdale in the 1930s. The two-story mansion, which had seven bedrooms and five bathrooms, was built of bricks, steel and cement. The mansion was eventually abandoned and boarded up, but it remained a local landmark. In 2010, a fire, which the authorities considered suspicious, completely destroyed the historic mansion.

== The Hatalacva Ruin ==
The Hatalacva Ruin is in a restricted area. The area was listed in the National Register of Historic Places (NRHP) in 1974, reference #74000463. According to the NRHP the Area of Significance is Prehistoric, the Cultural Affiliation is Sinagua and the Period of Significance is 1499–1000.

== Properties pictured ==
The following is a brief description with the images of the historic properties listed in the National Register of Historic Places.

- Broadway Bridge – built in 1917 and located over Bitter Creek on Broadway Road. Listed in the National Register of Historic Places in 1988, reference #88001651.
- The Clark Memorial Clubhouse – built in 1926 and located at 19 N. 19th Street. It was listed in the National Register of Historic Places in 1982, reference #82001662.
Historic individual structures in Clarkdale
listed in the National Register of Historic Places.

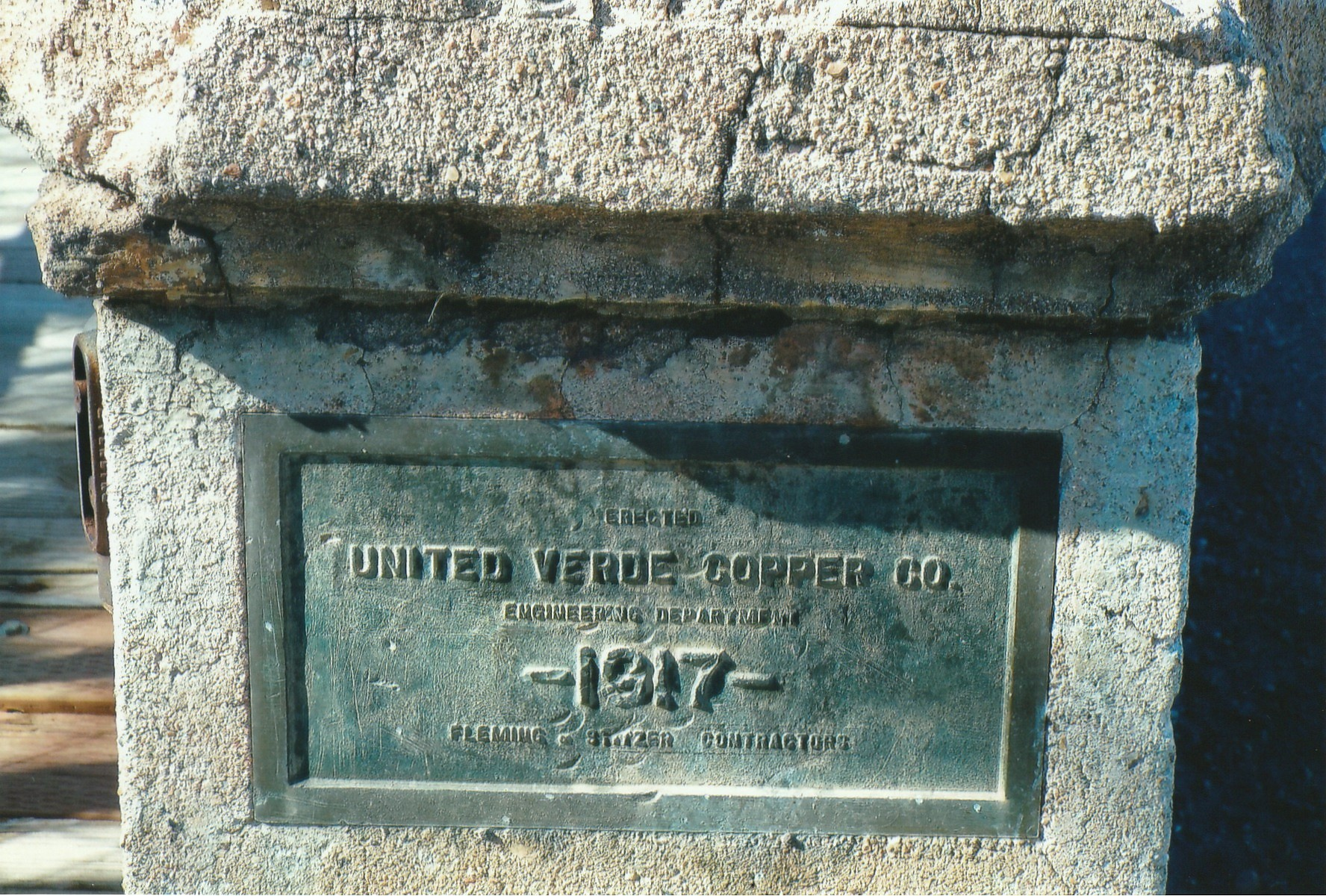
Historic marker on Broadway Bridge.

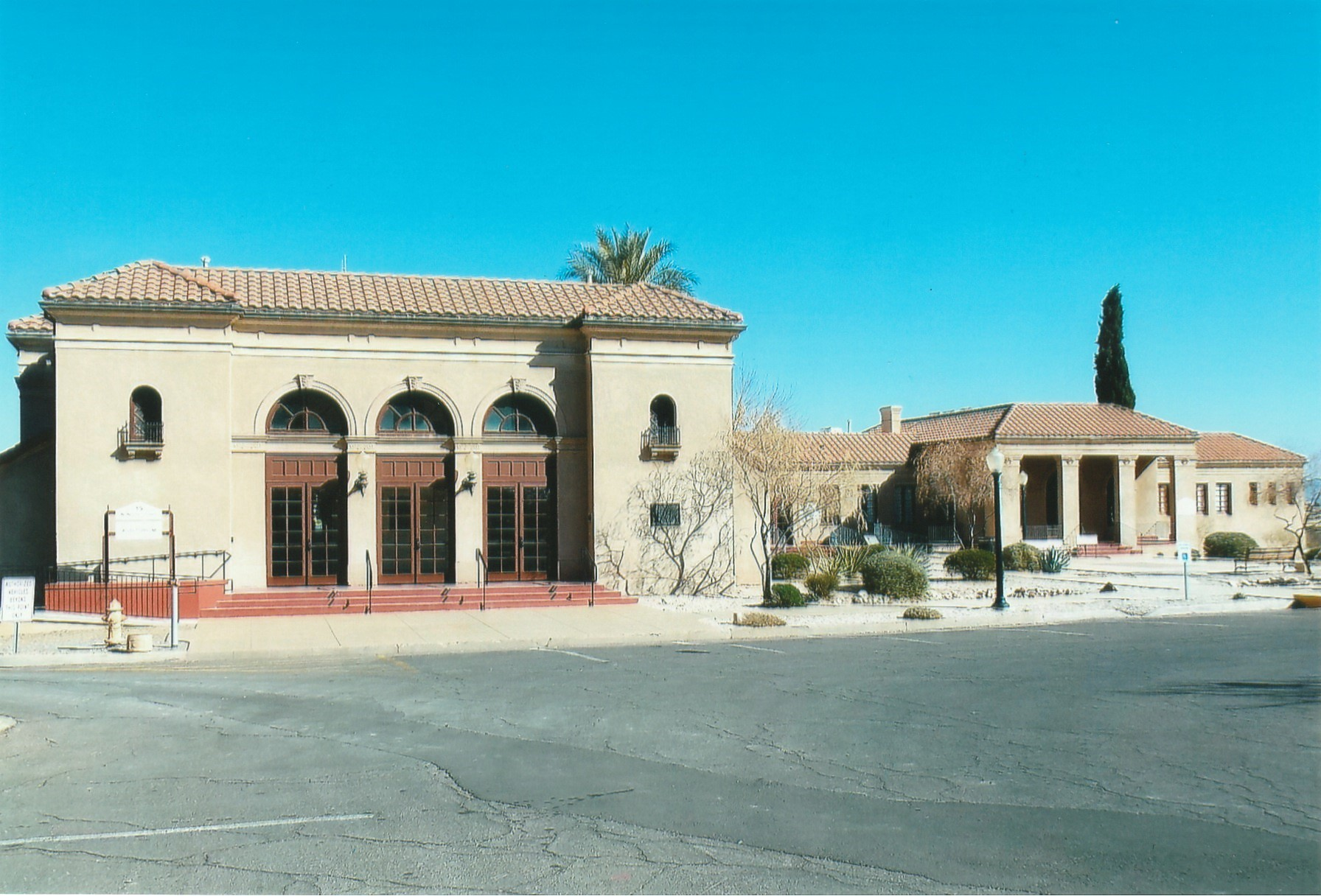
Clark Memorial Clubhouse.

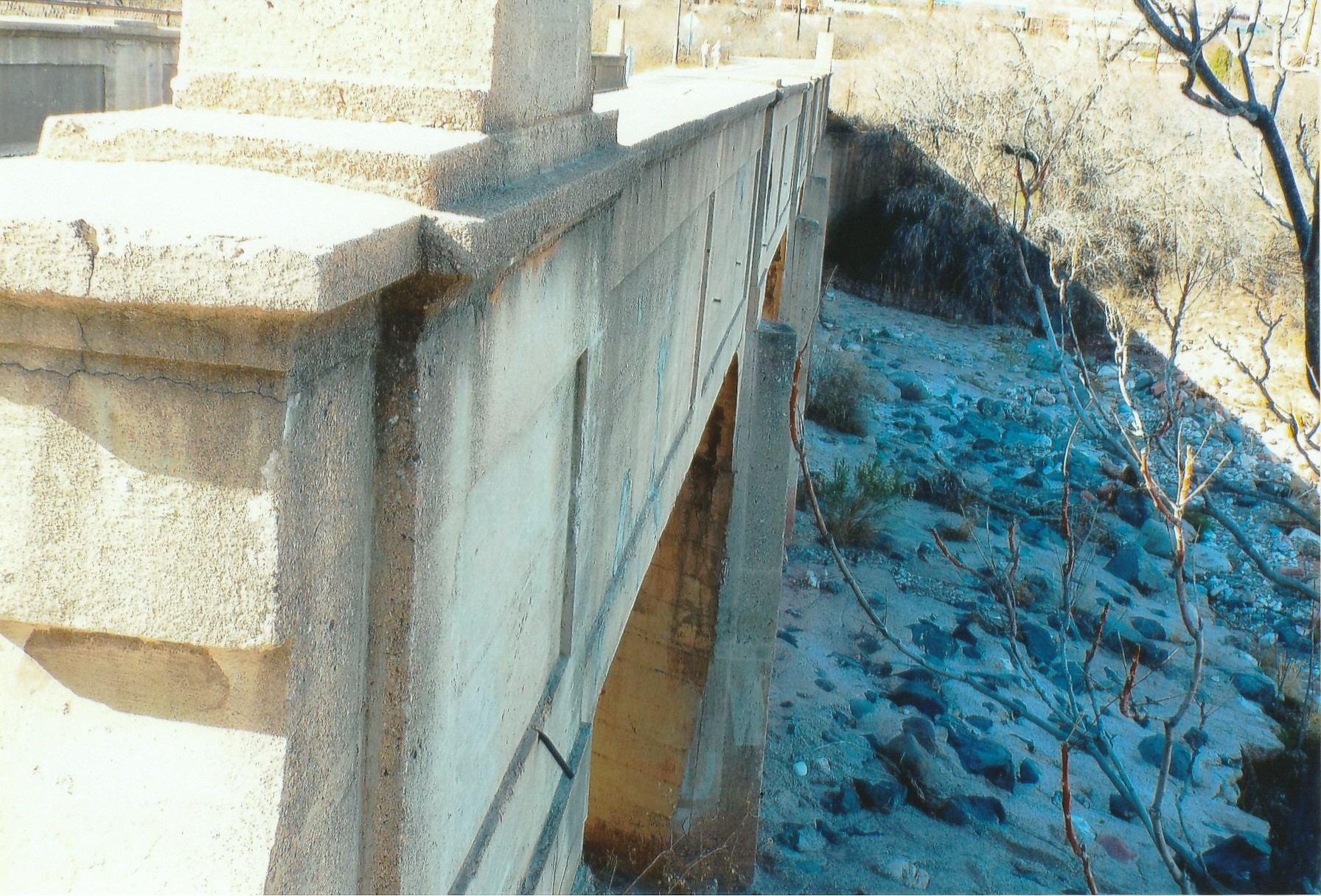
Broadway Bridge over Bitter Creek.

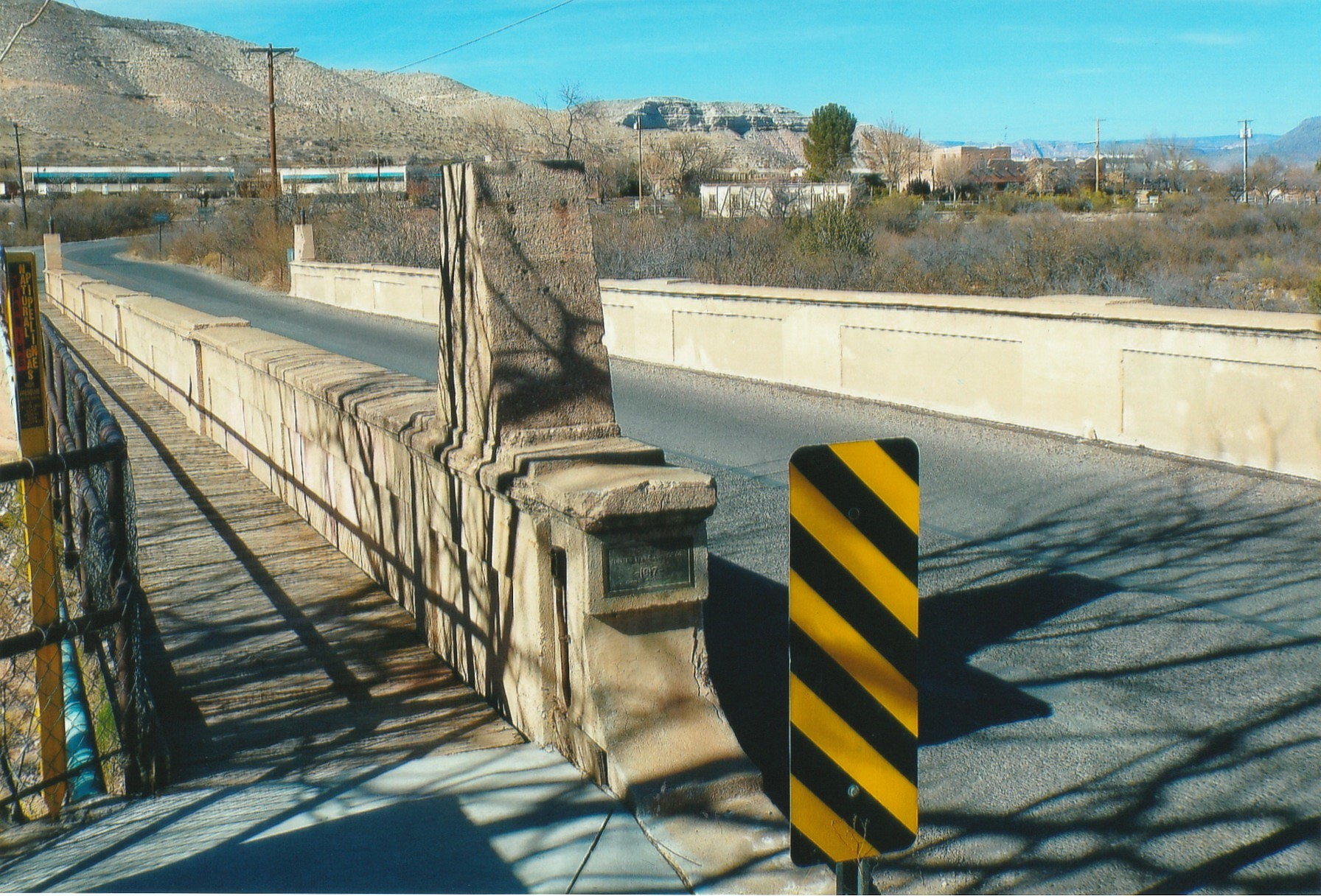
Different view of the Broadway Bridge.

== Clarkdale Historic District ==
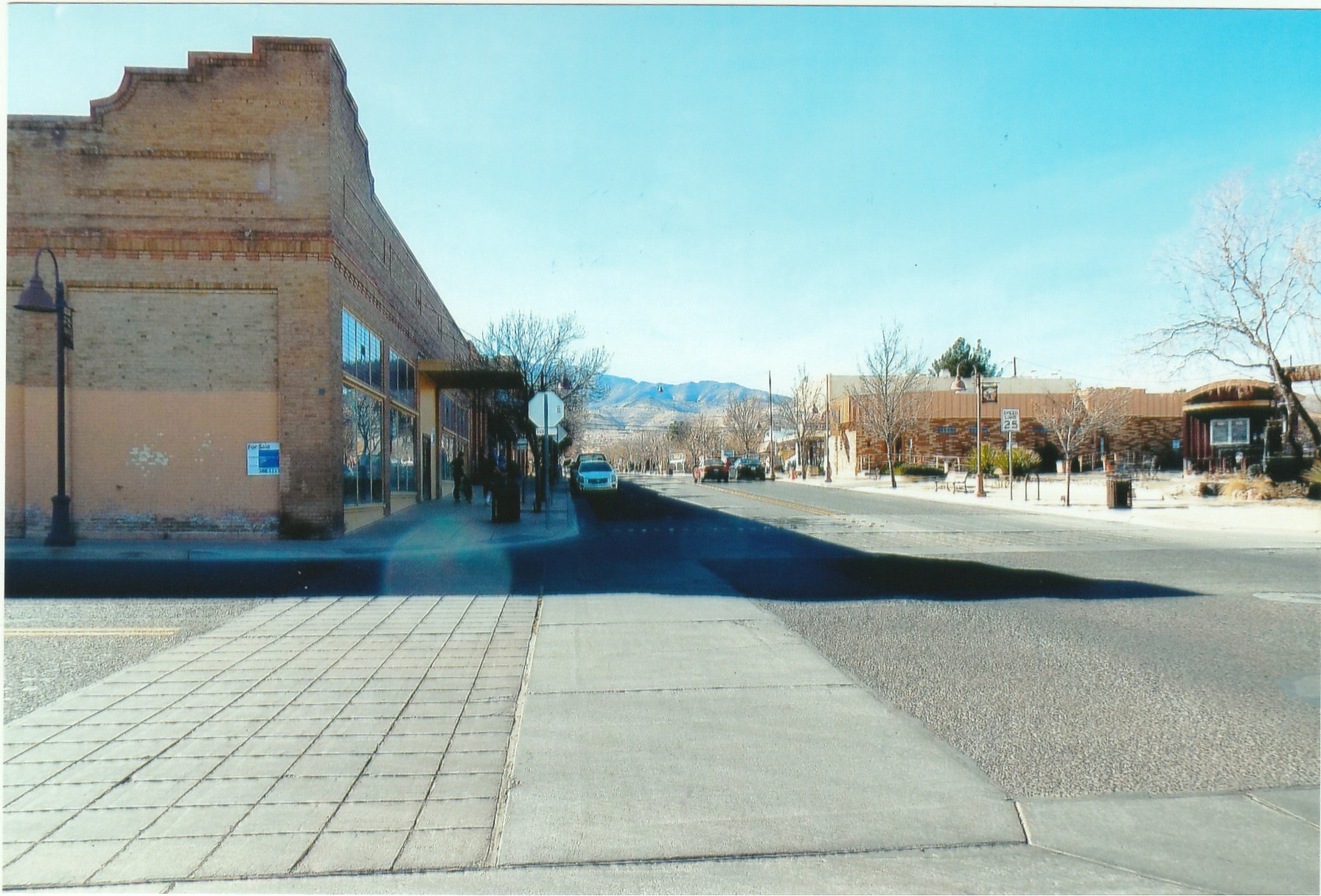
Clarkdale Historic District

The following is a brief description with the images and the original names of the historic properties located within the Clarkdale Historic District.

- The Clarkdale Public Works Building – located at 890 Main Street.
- Clarkdale High School – built in 1915 and located at 849 Main Street. It now houses the Copper Art Museum.
- Giant copper beer kettle – built in Belgium in 1931
- St. Cecilia Catholic Church – built in 1924 and located at 850 Main Street
- Copper Church Bell – located on the grounds of the Copper Art Museum on 849 Main Street.
- The Old Clarkdale Medical Clinic – built in 1918 and located at 900 First North St. Now the Clarkdale Historical Society and Museum.
- Old Elementary School – built in 1819 and located at 600 First North St.
- Brick Building – built in 1918 and located at 907 Main Street.
- The Grand Theatre – built in 1917 and located at 919 Main Street.
- Old Sidewalk Café – built in 1914 and located at 915 Main Street.

== Historic properties in Clarkdale's Historic District ==
Structures in the Clarkdale Historic District
listed in the National Register of Historic Places.

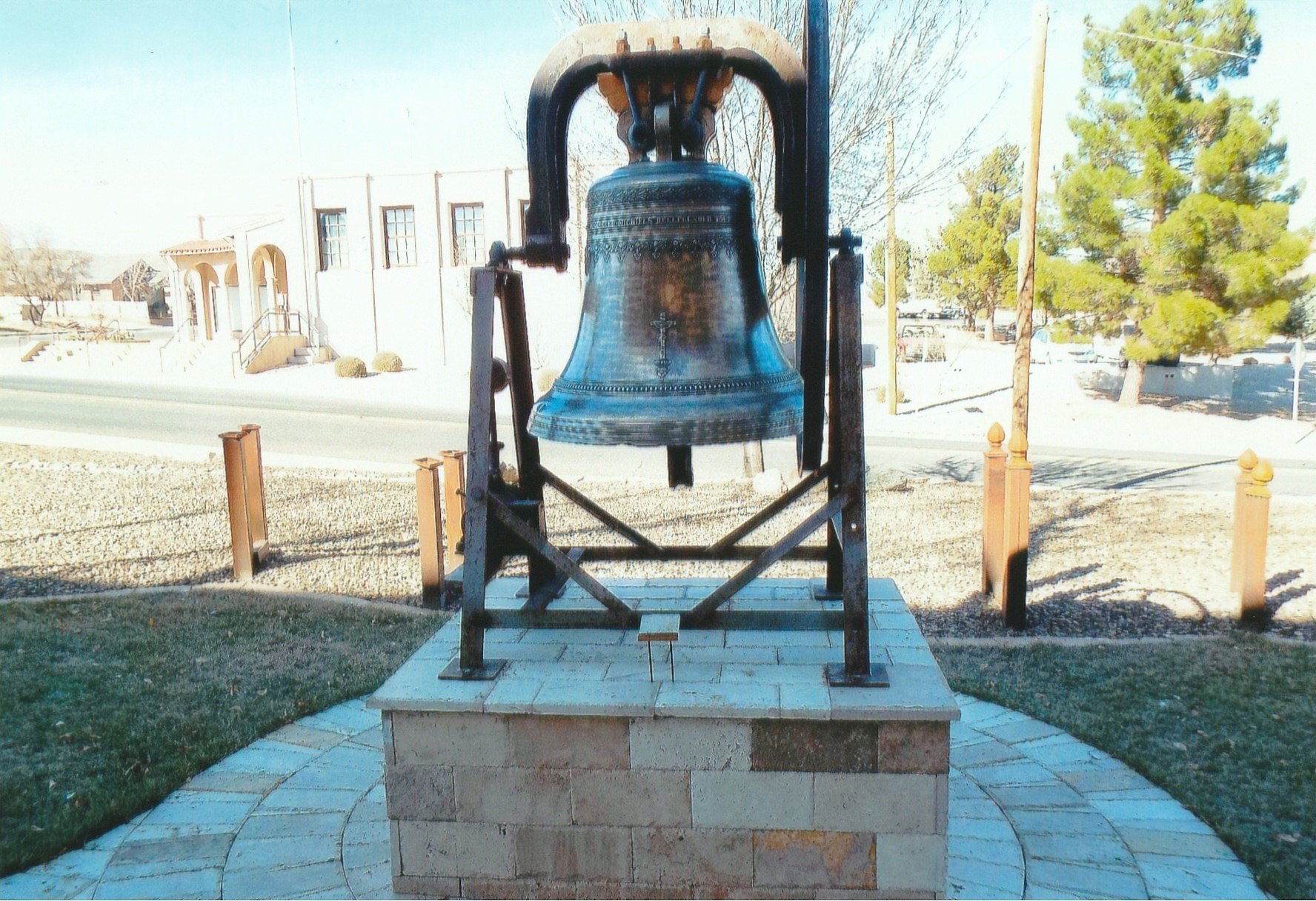
Copper Church Bell located in the Copper Art Museum.

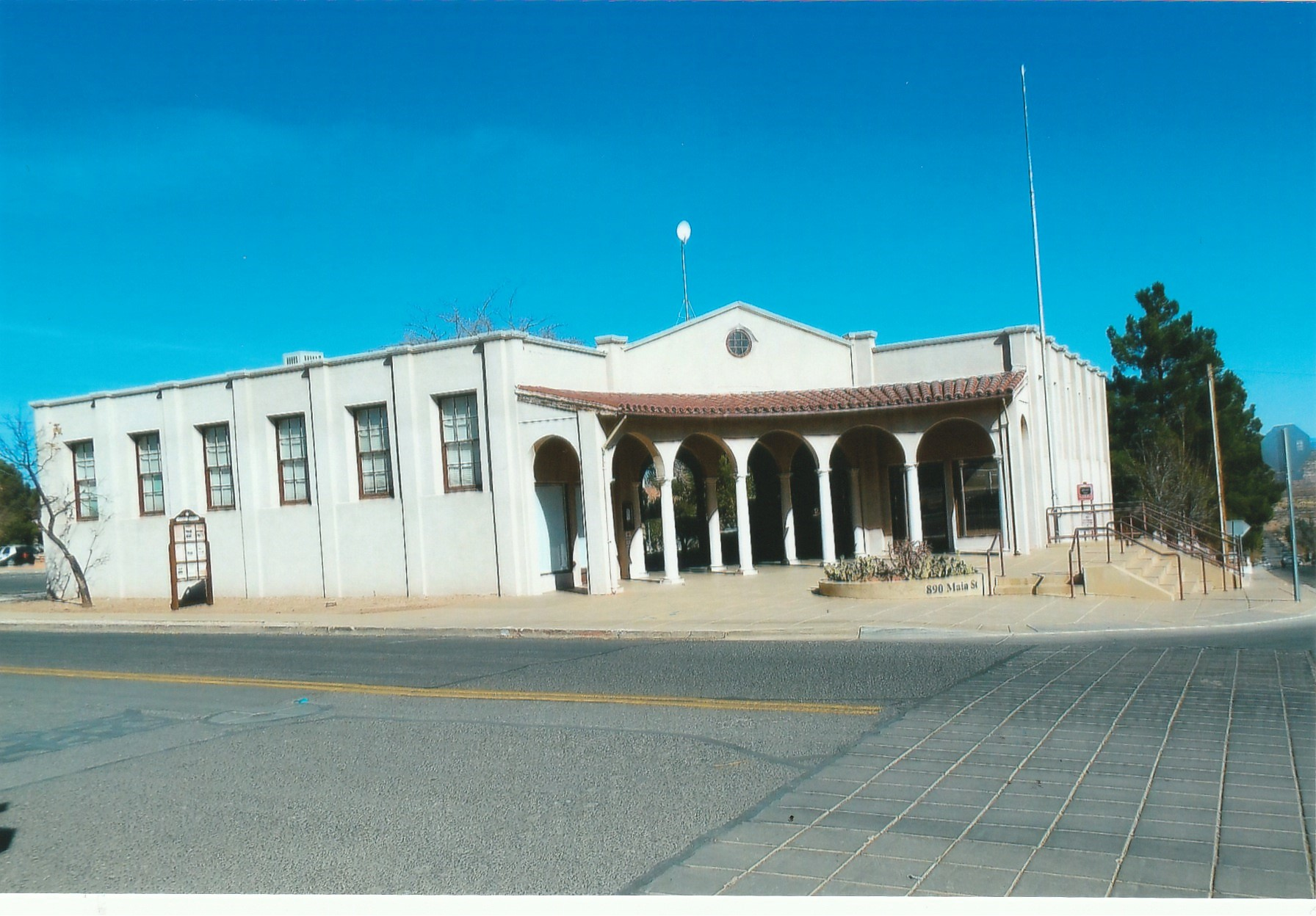
Clarkdale Public Works Building.

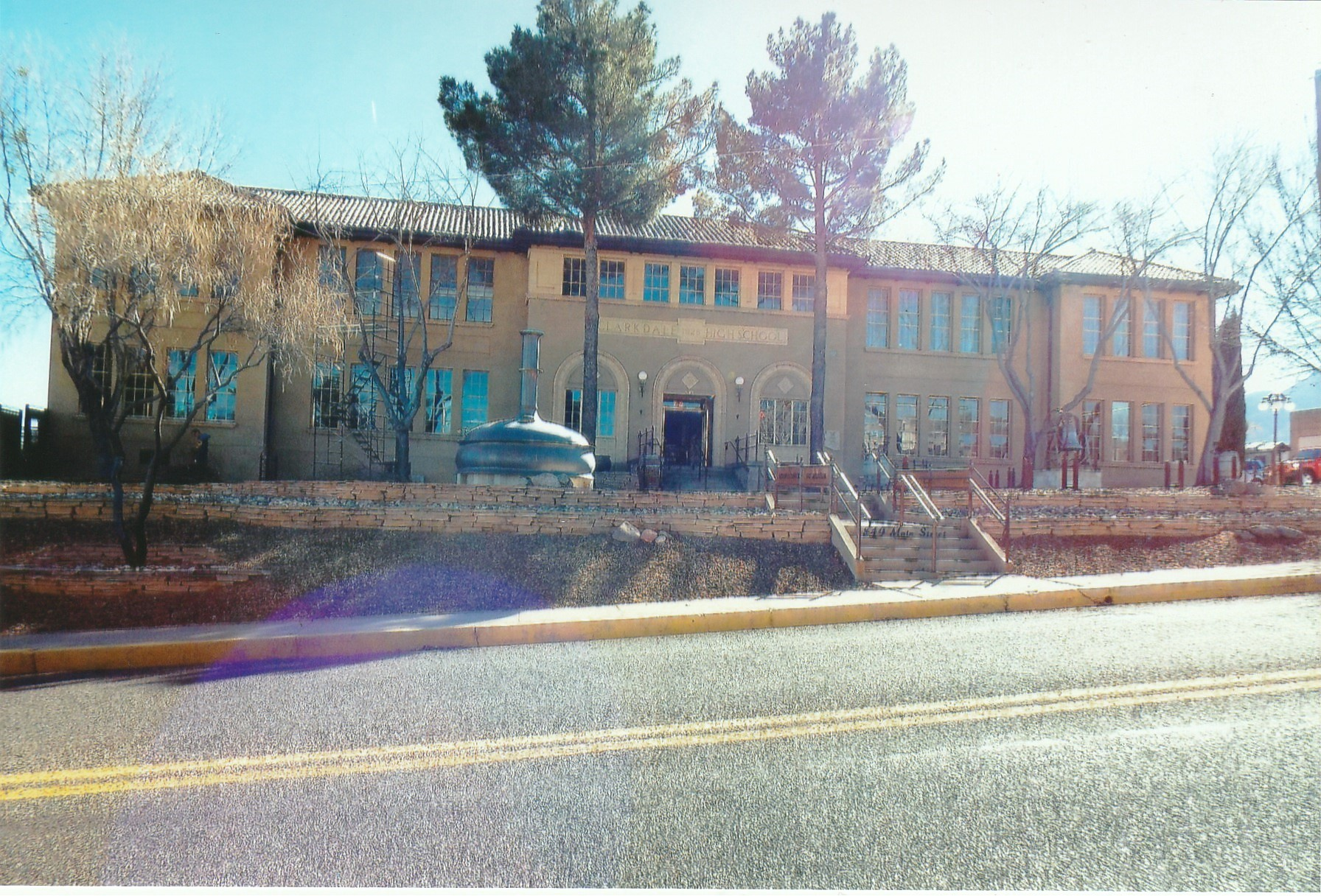
Clarkdale High School.

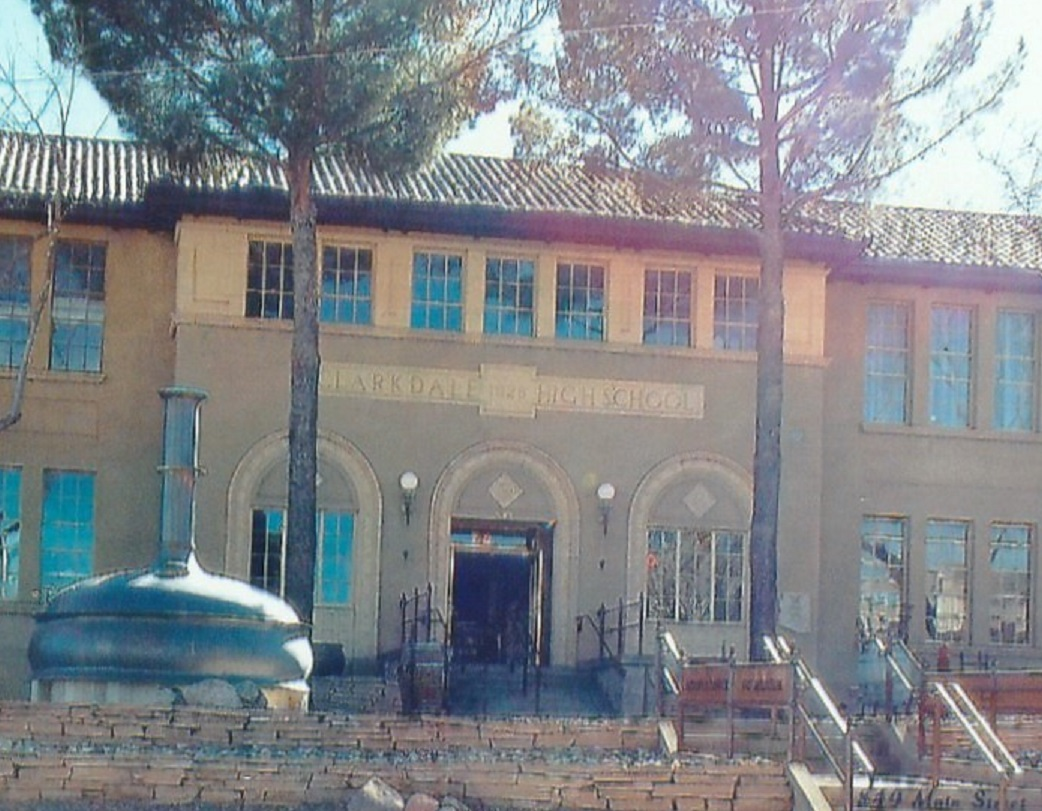
Different view Clarkdale High School

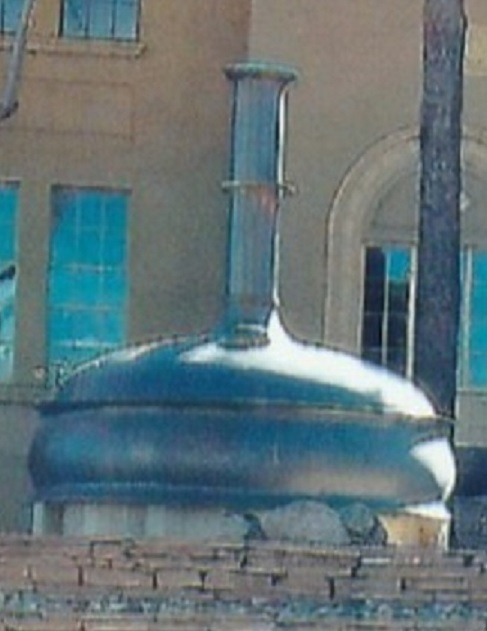
Giant copper beer kettle

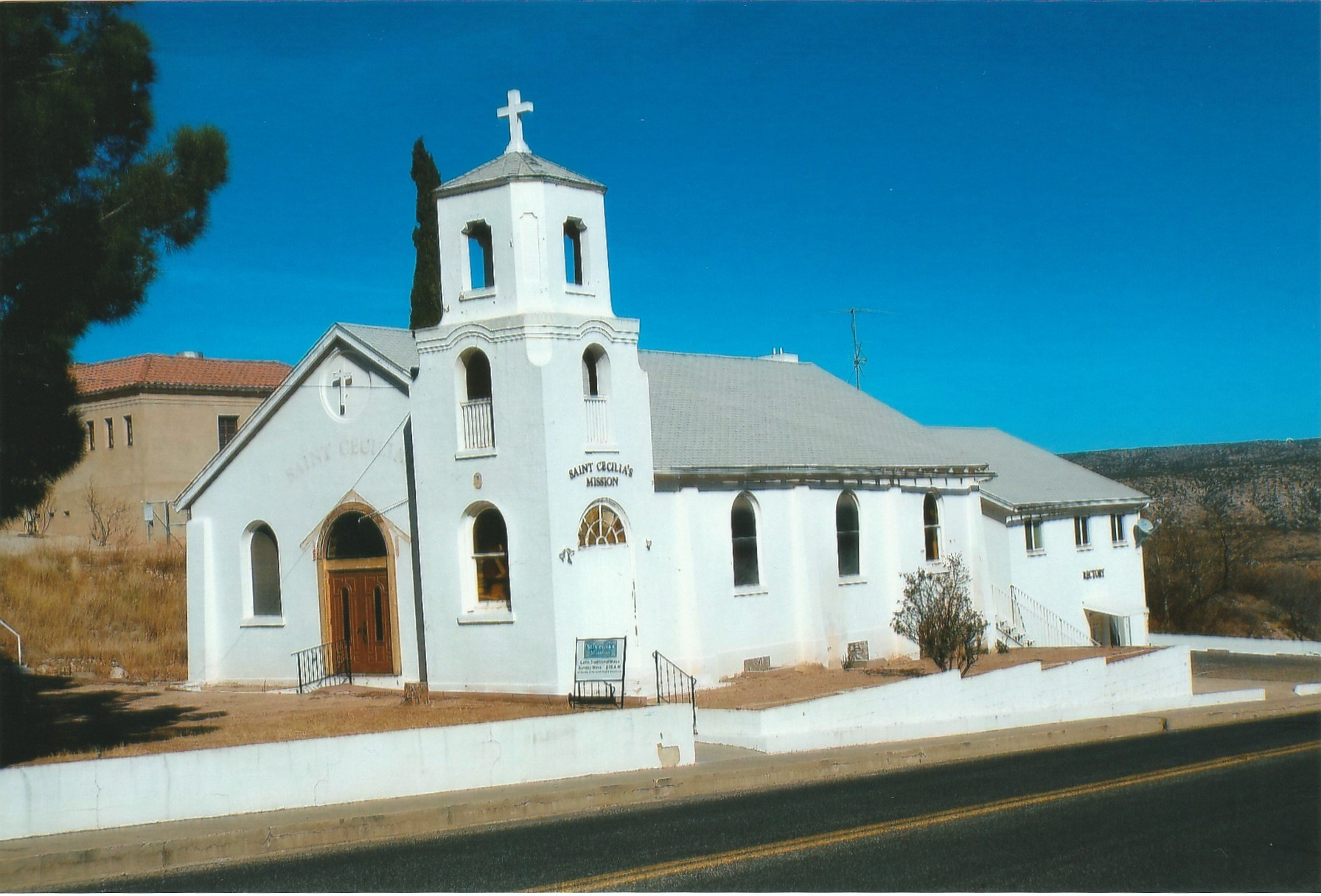
St. Cecilia Catholic Church.

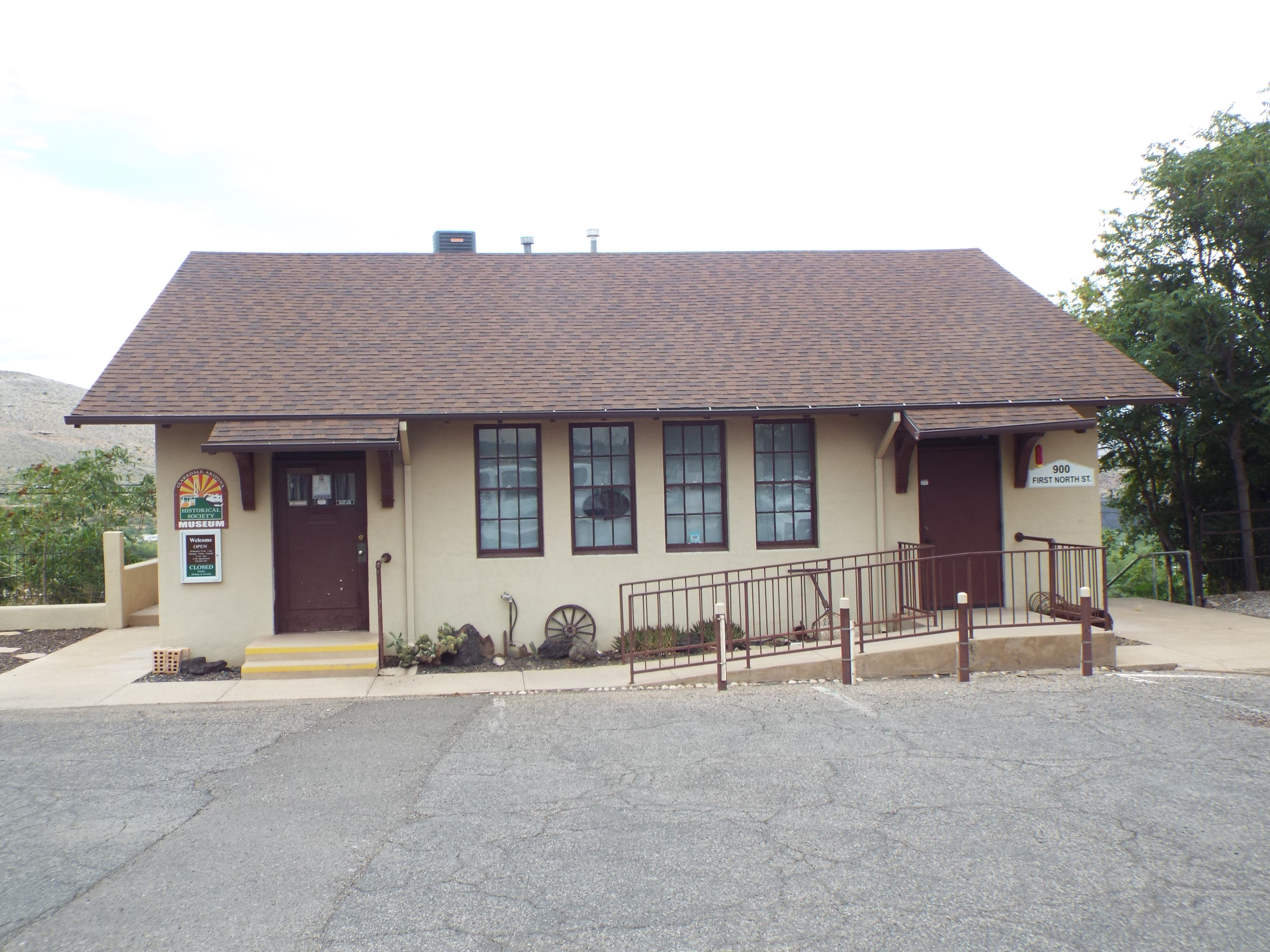
Old Clarkdale Medical Clinic

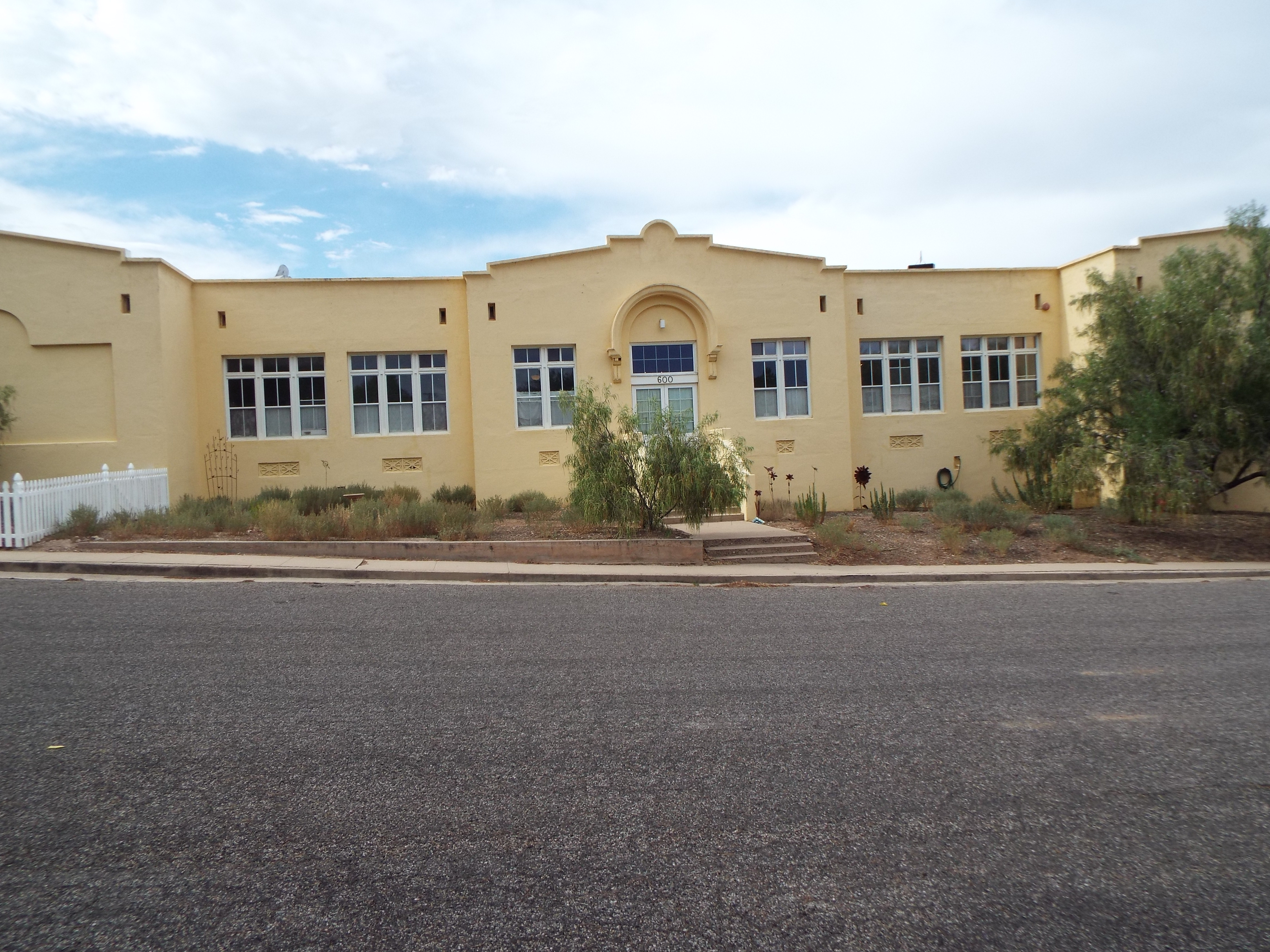
Old Elementary School

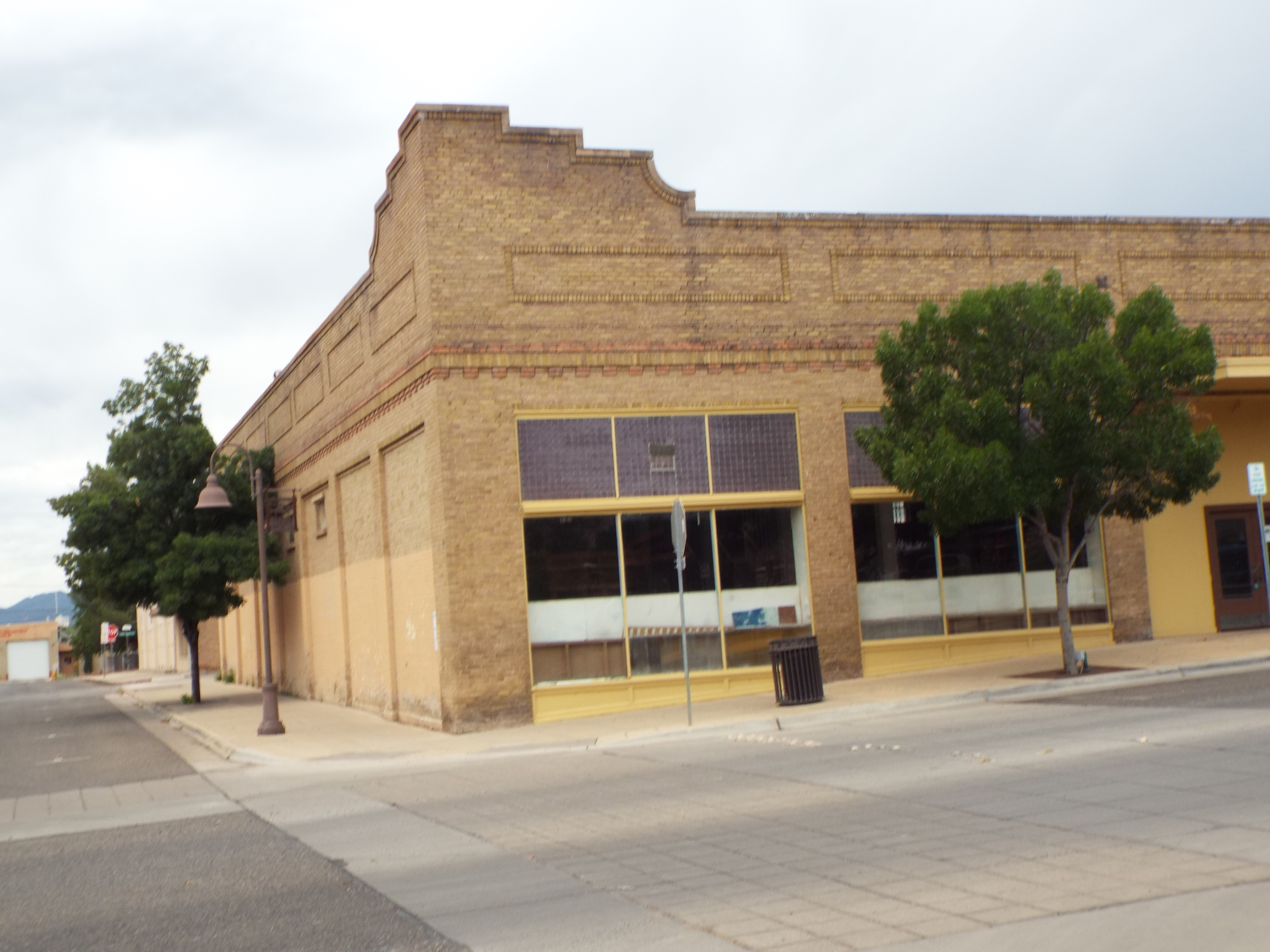
Brick Building

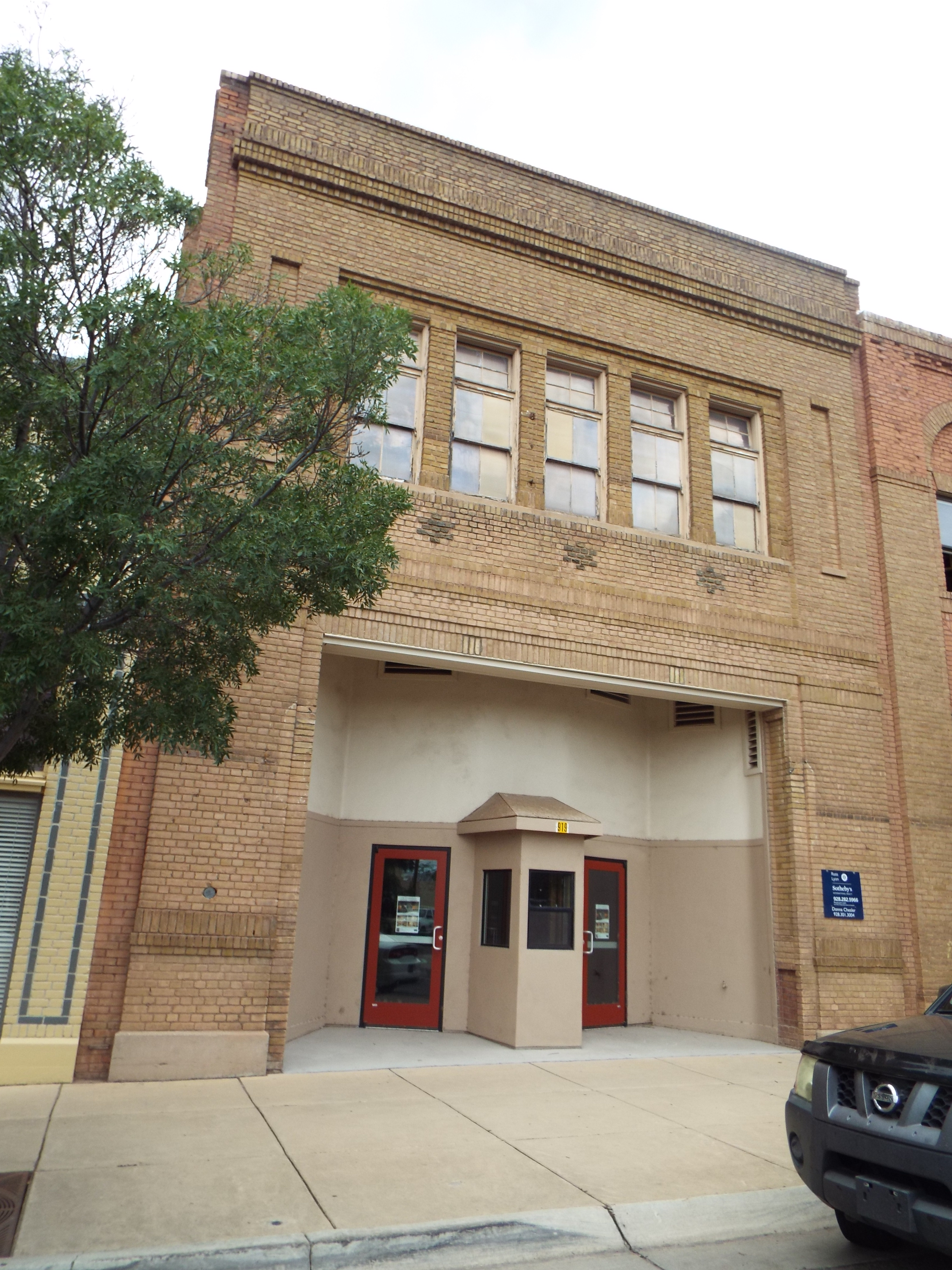
Grand Theatre

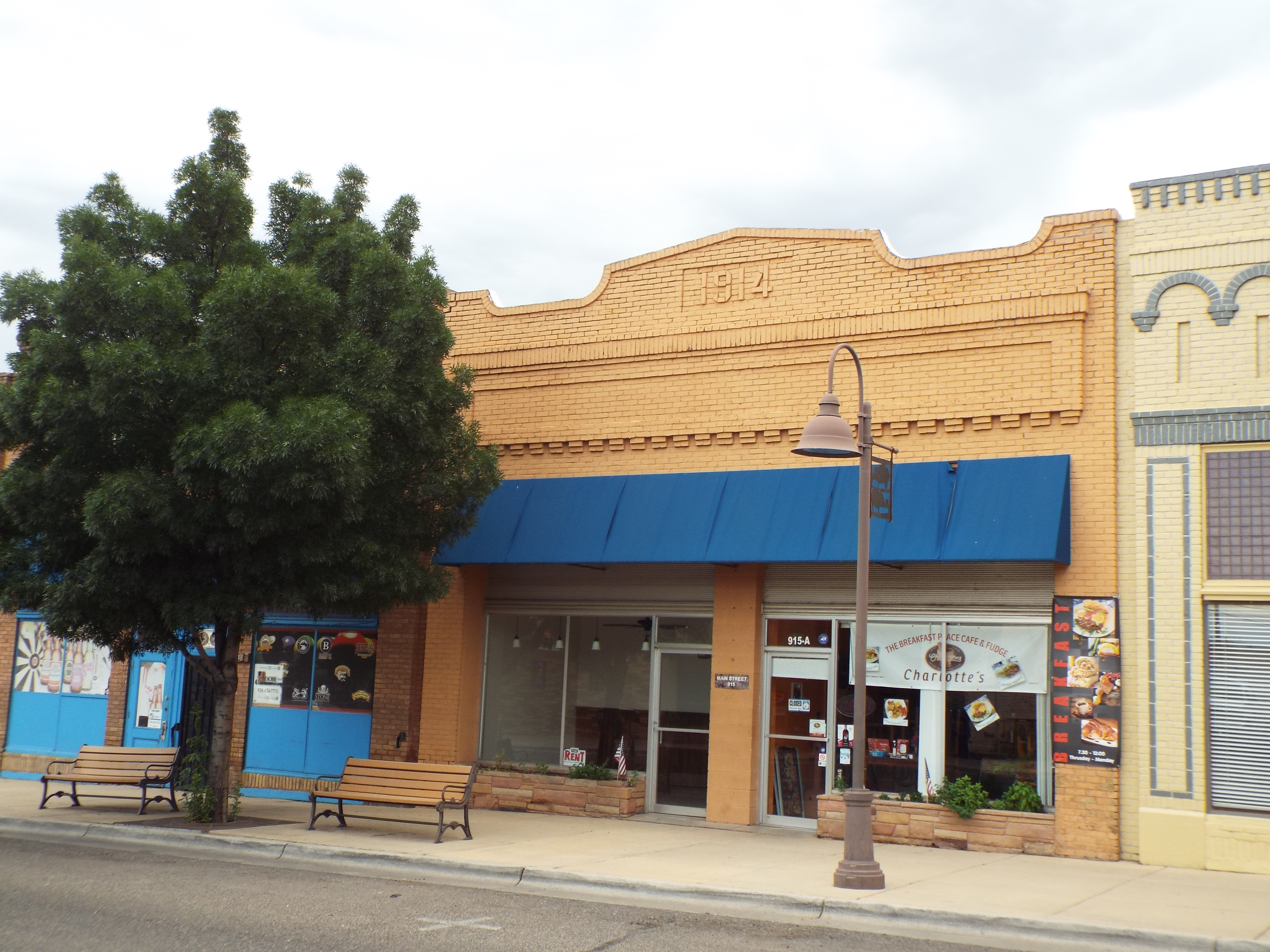
Old Sidewalk Café

== United Verde Copper Company Smelter ==
The following are structures related to the United Verde Copper Company Smelter complex:

- Smelter Machine Shop – built in 1913 and located on 250 Luke Lane.
- Smelter Superintendent House – built in 1916 and on located 351 Luke Lane.
- Santa Fe, Prescott and Phoenix Railway Roundhouse – built in 1900 and located on 250 Luke Lane.
- Old Clarkdale Santa Fe, Prescott and Phoenix Railway Depot ruins – built in 1895 and located by Miller Road.
- Abandoned Extension Santa Fe, Prescott and Phoenix Railway Trestle Bridge – built in 1896 over Bitter Creek.
- The Miller Wholesale Warehouse – built c.1920 and located below Upper Clarkdale near the smelter site.
United Verde Copper Company Smelter

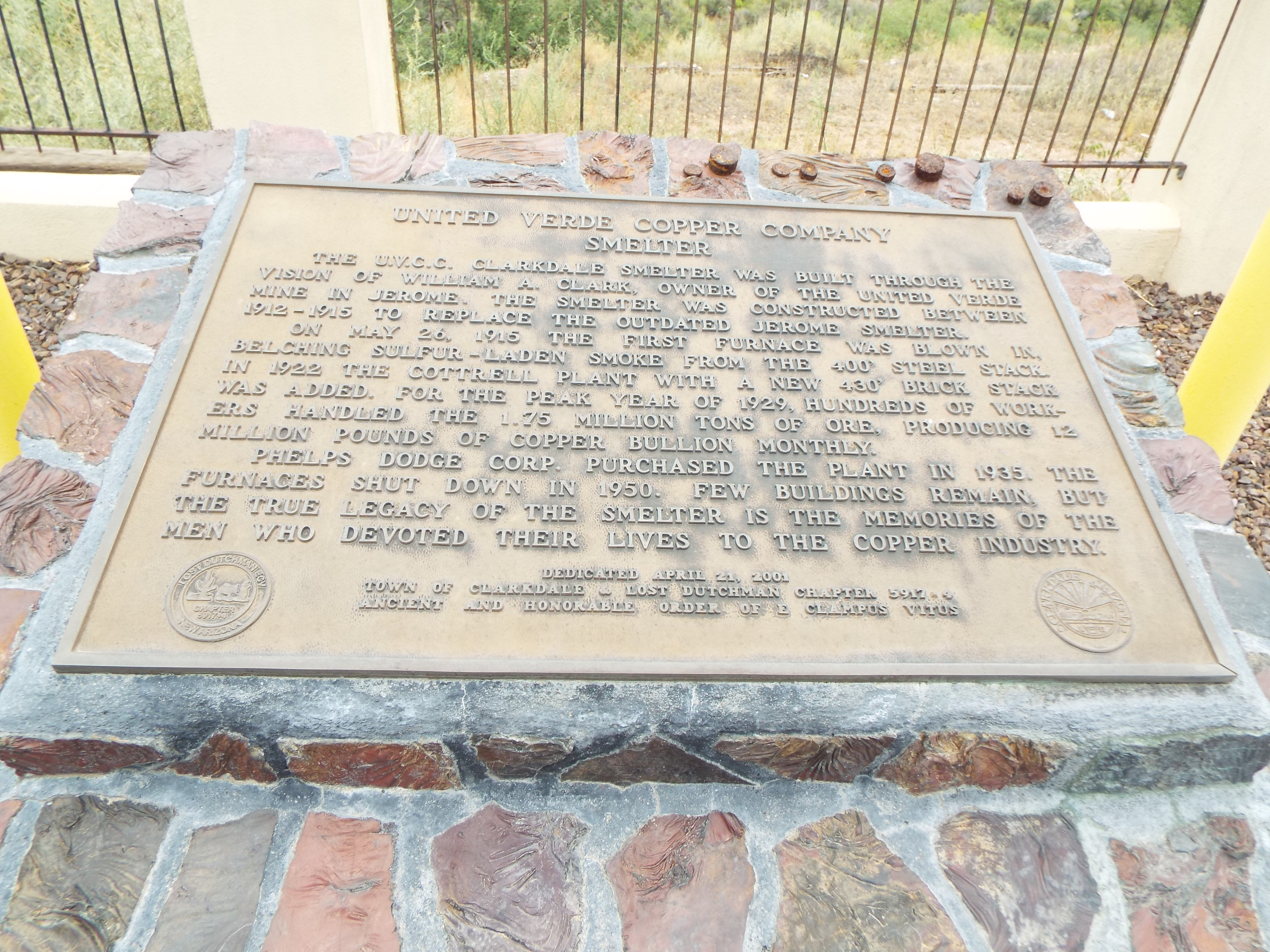
United Verde Copper Company Smelter marker

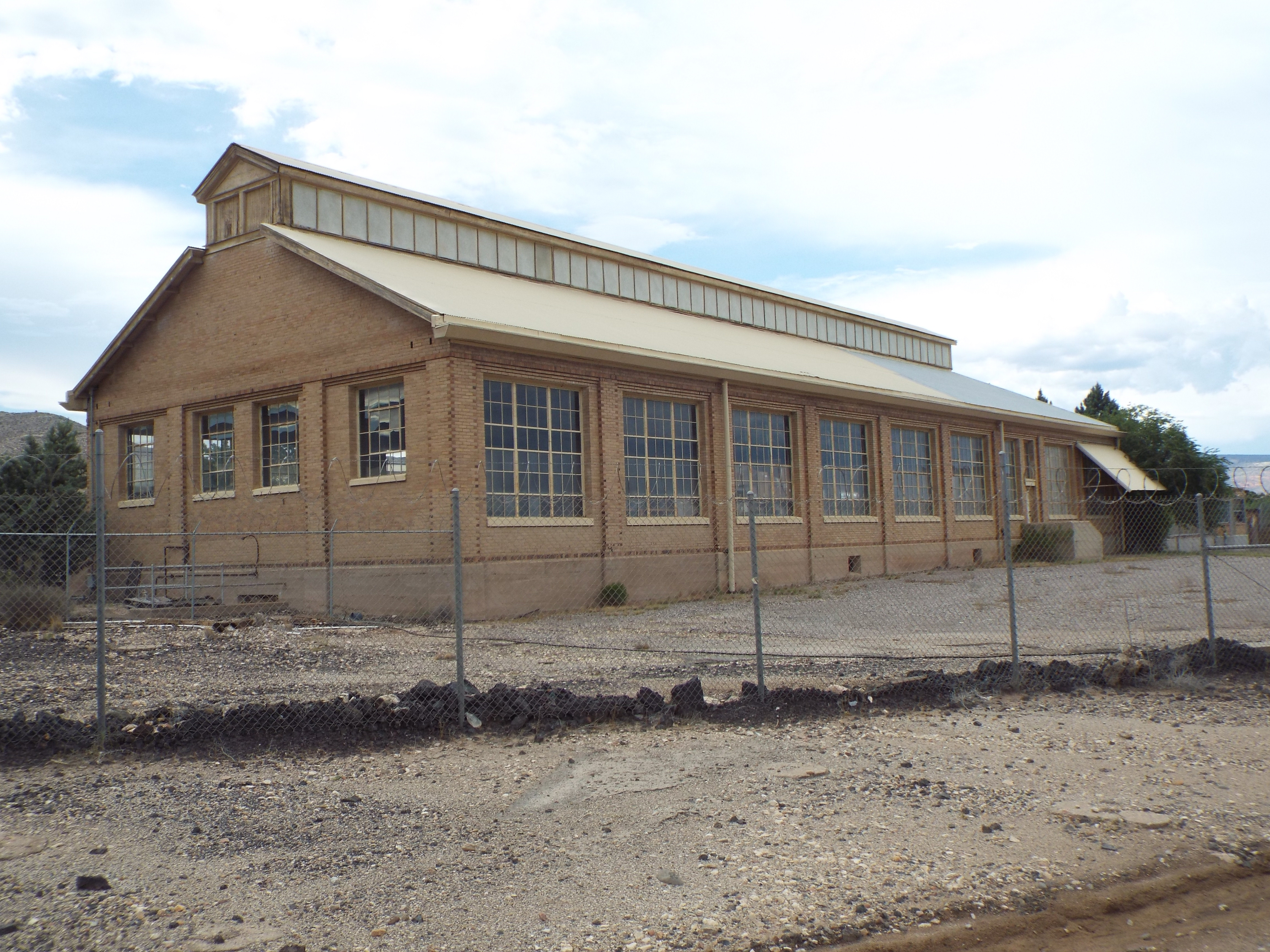
Smelter Machine Shop – 1913

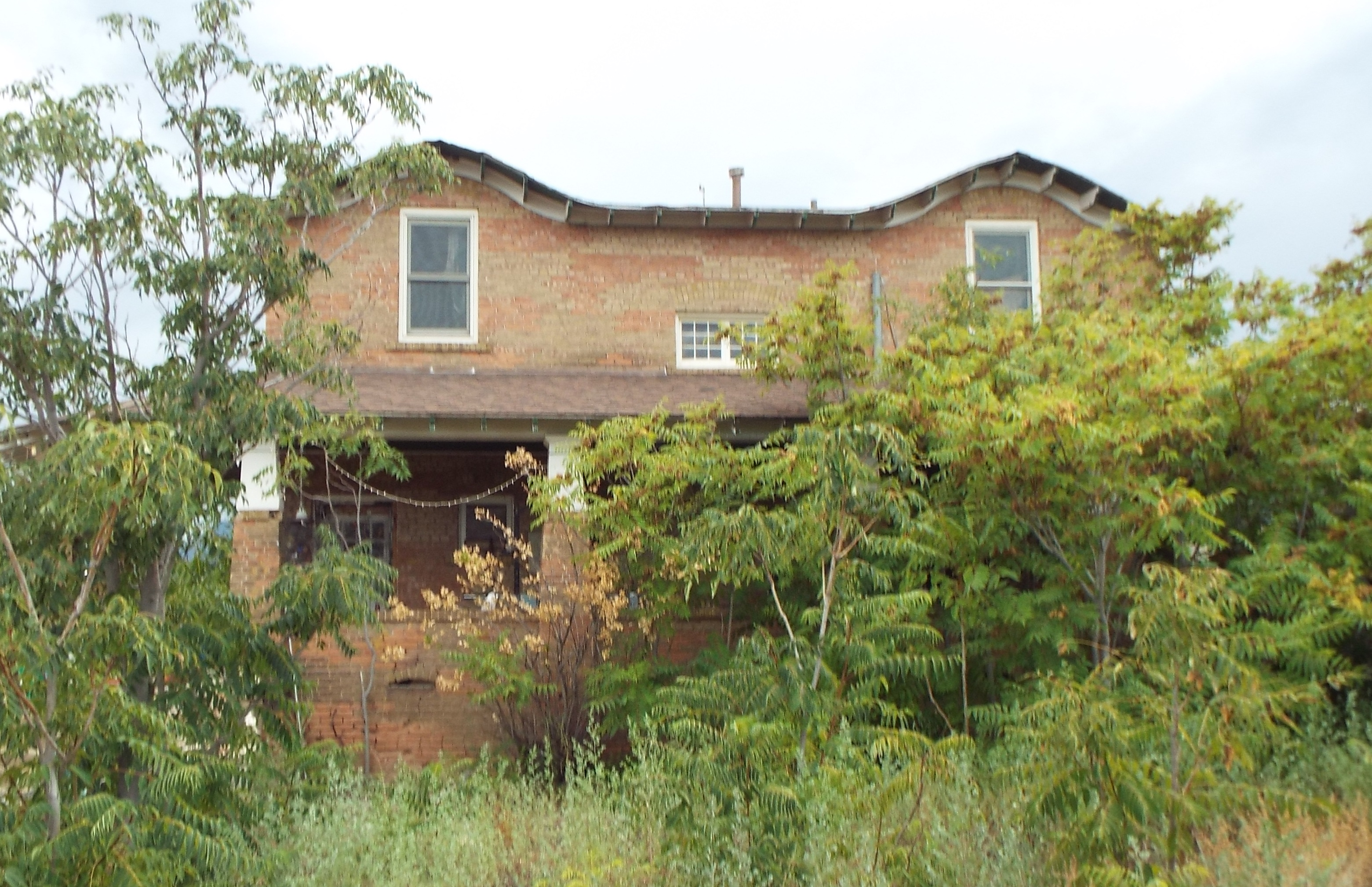
Smelter Superintendent House – 1916

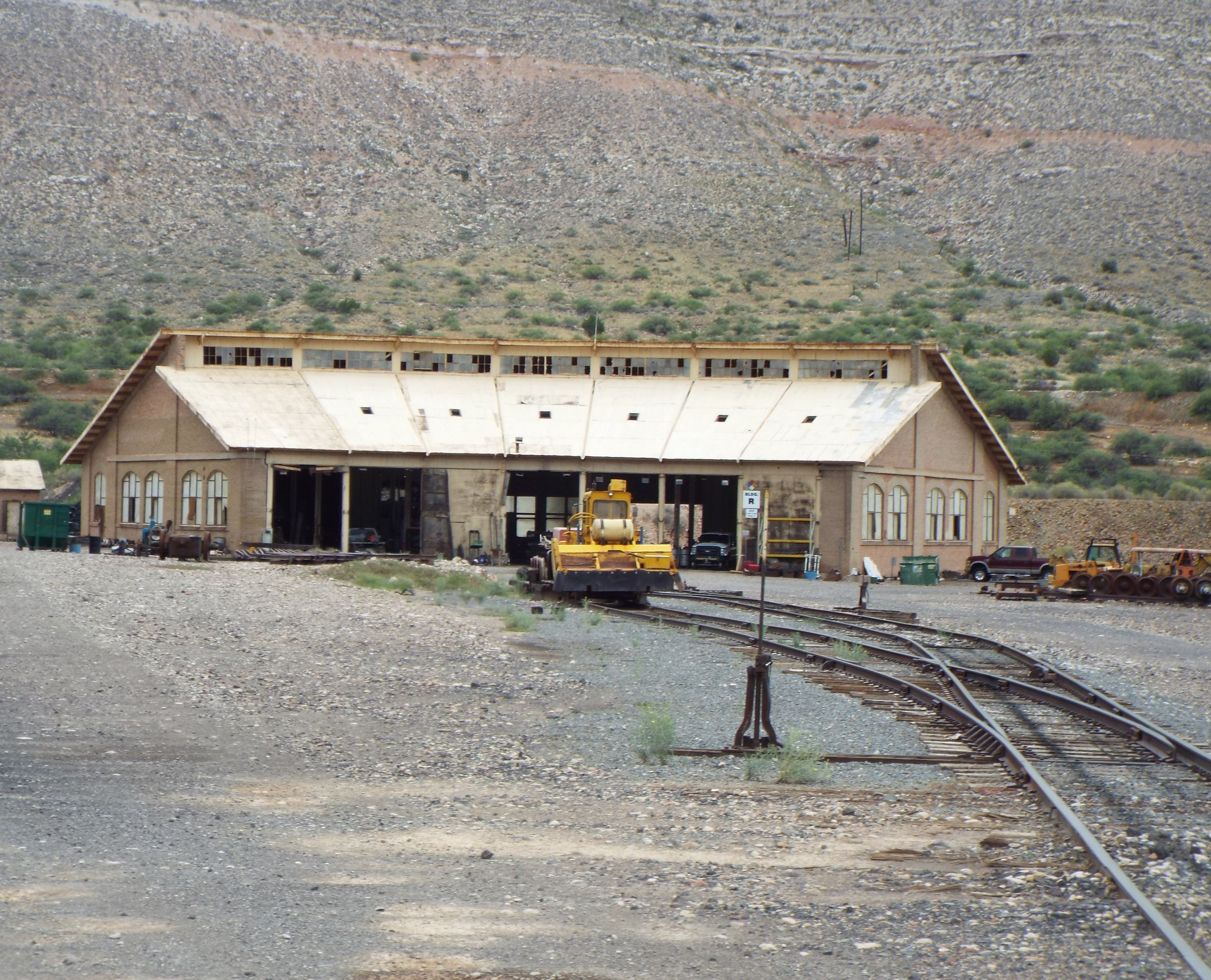
Roundhouse – 1900

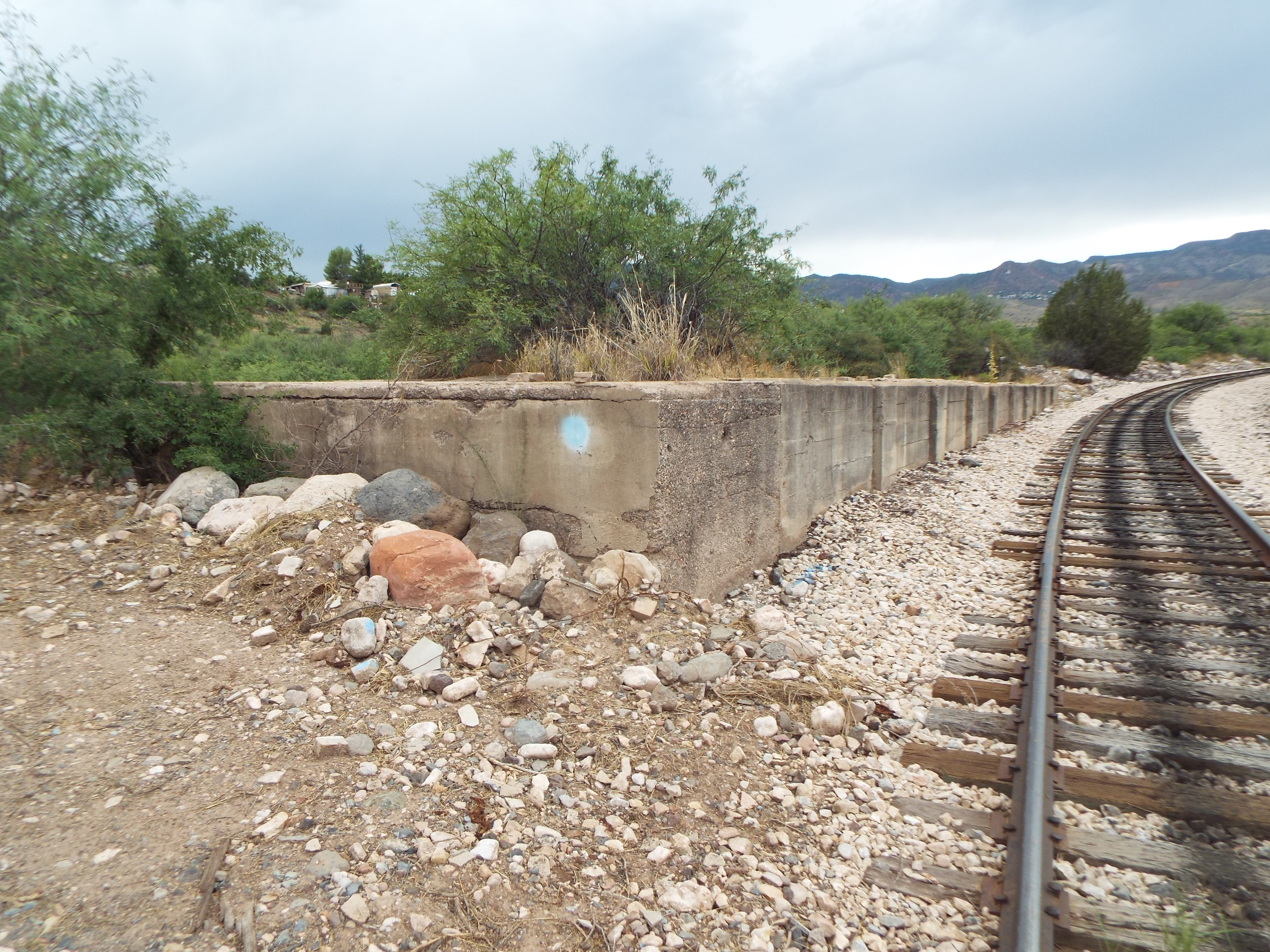
Depot ruins – 1895

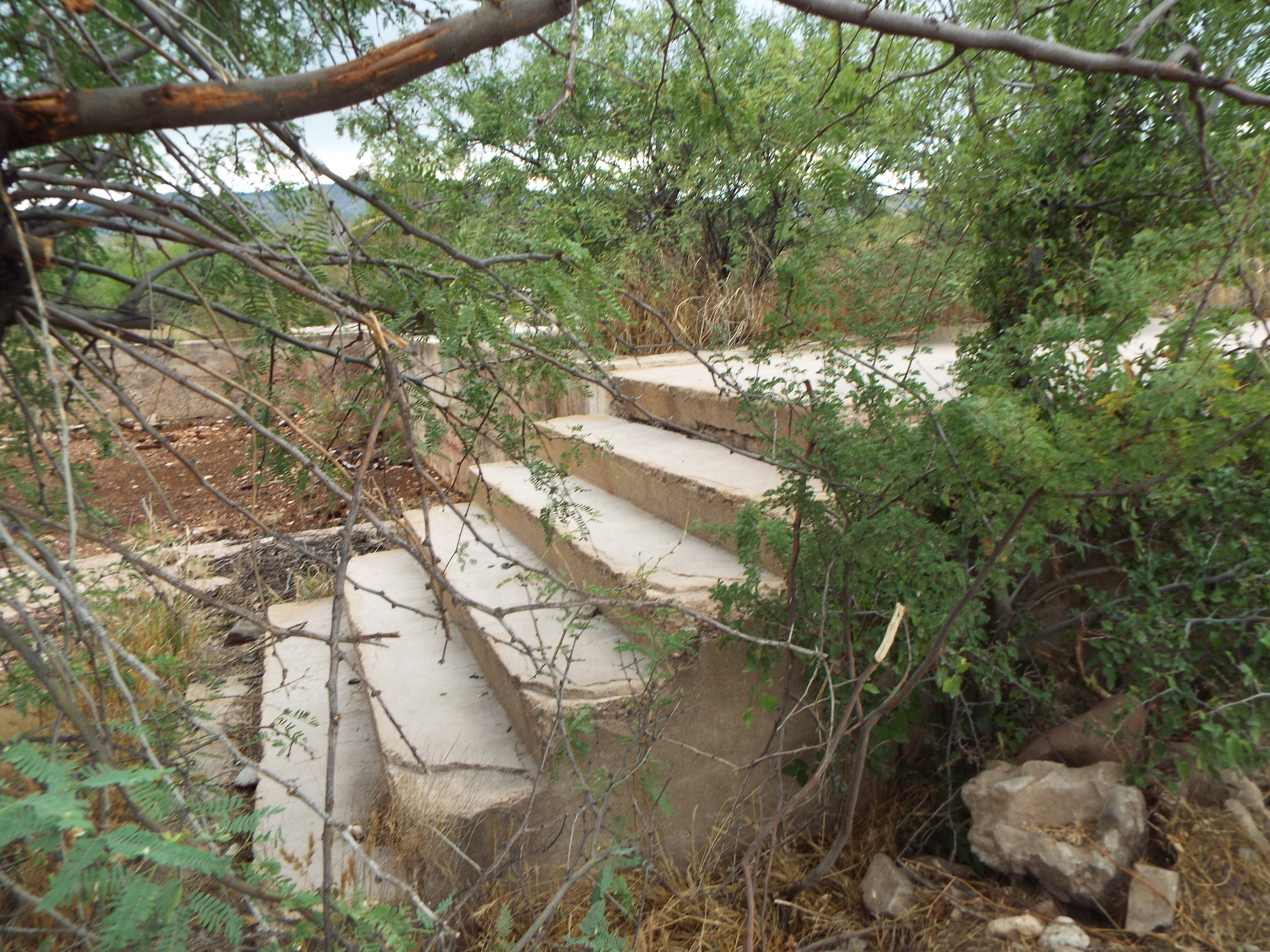
Depot ruins – 1895

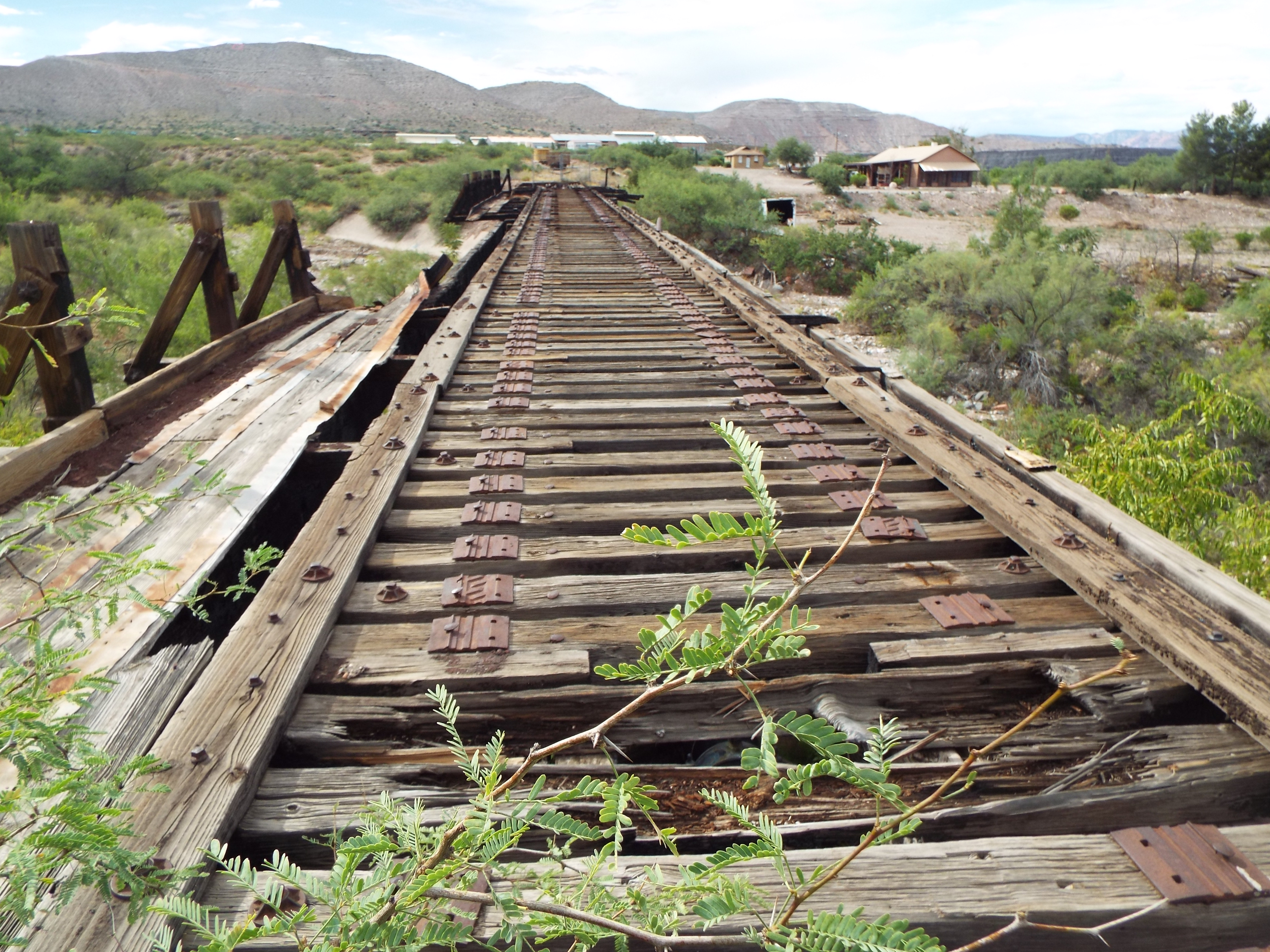
Trestle bridge – 1910

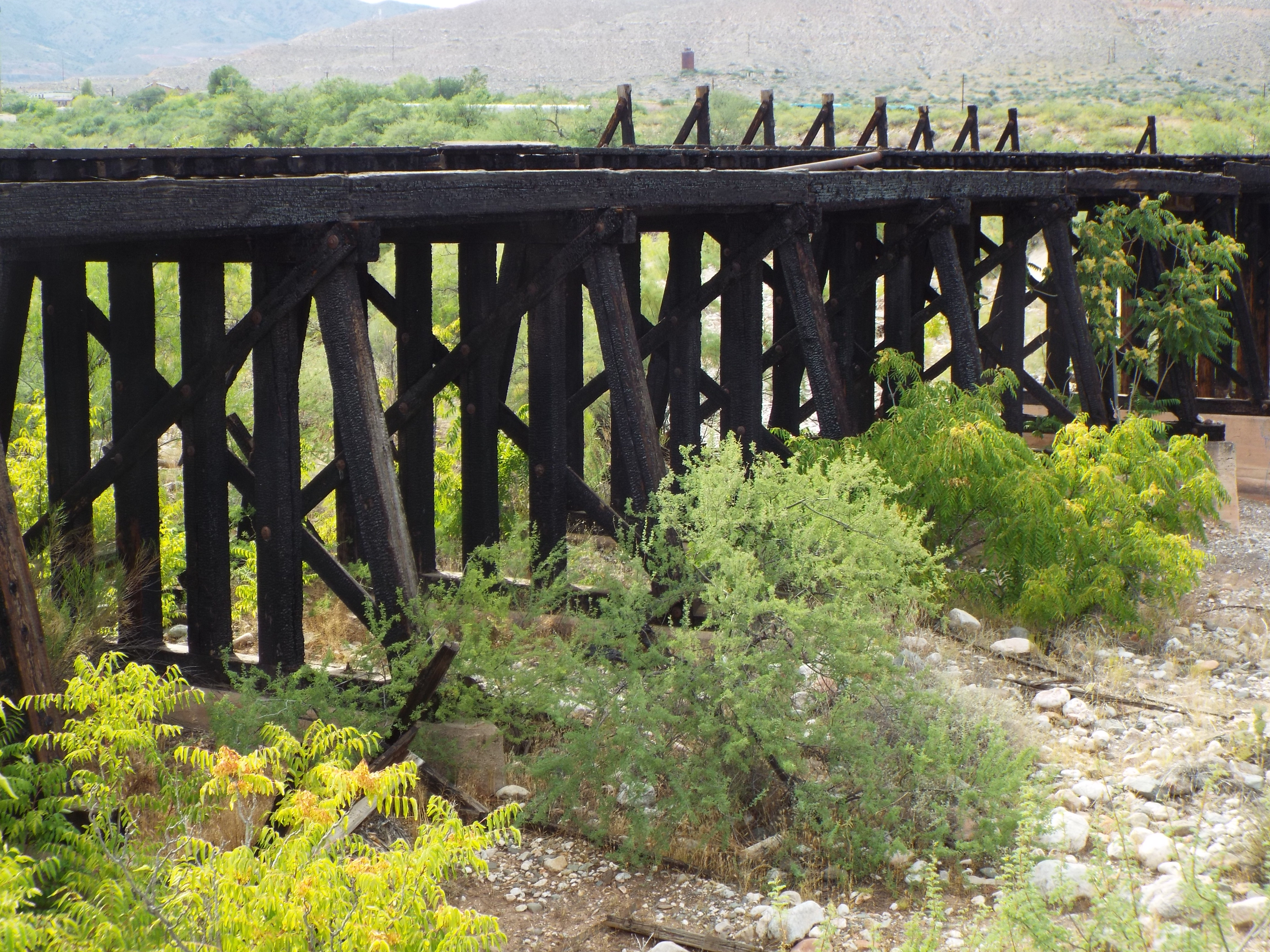
Trestle bridge – 1910

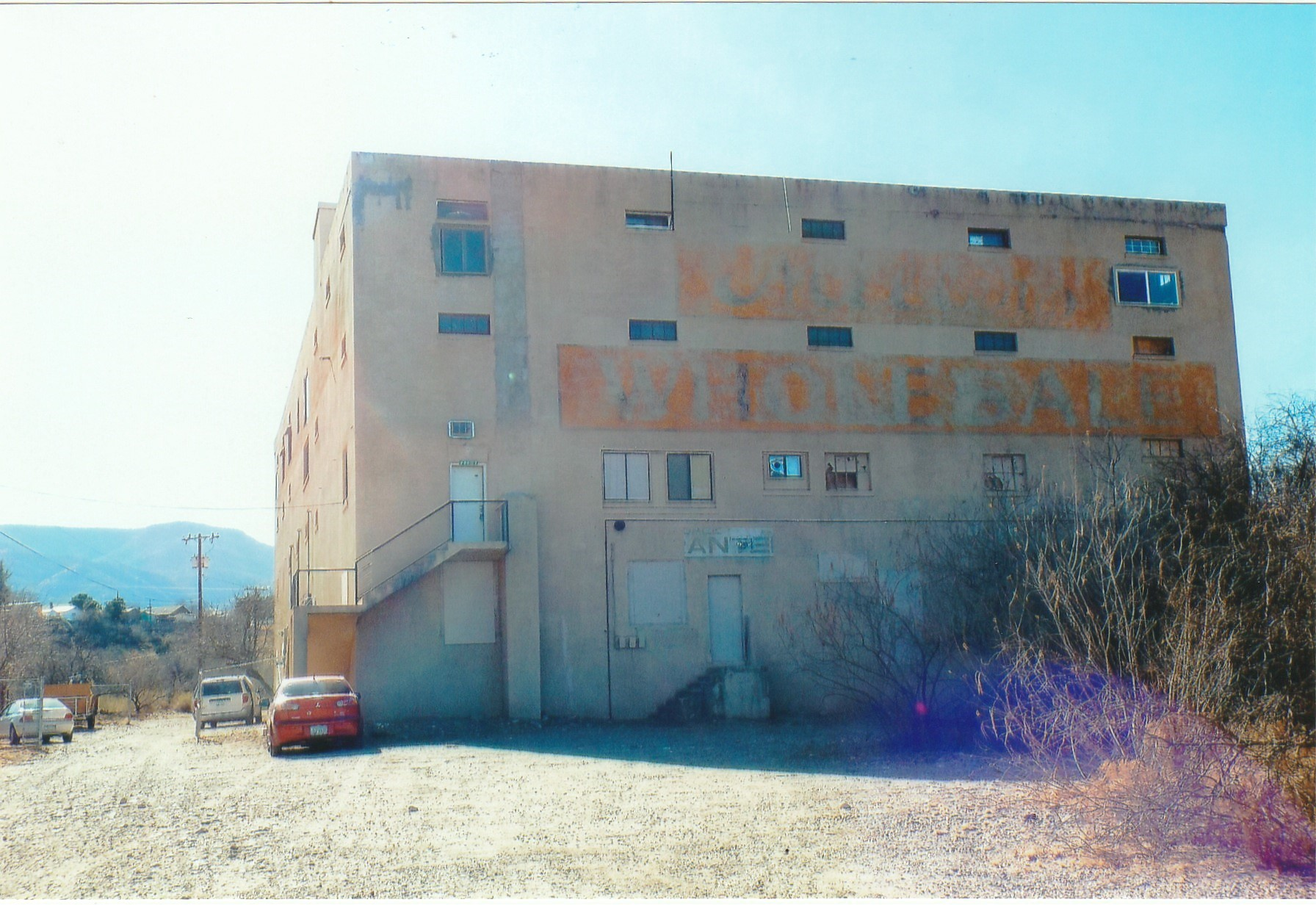
Miller Wholesale Warehouse building.

== Verde Canyon Railroad ==
Clark ordered the building of a railroad for his mining operations. The Santa Fe Railway owned and operated the branch line from 1912 to 1988. The tracks linked the copper smelter at Clarkdale and the copper mines at Jerome to the Santa Fe Railway tracks passing through Drake.

The Verde Canyon Railroad is a passenger excursion heritage railroad which runs between Clarkdale and Perkinsville. Both engines of the Verde Canyon Railroad are FP7 locomotives whose numbers are #1510 and #1512. They were built in 1953 in LaGrange, Illinois by the General Motors' Electro Motive Division. Both engines served the Alaska Railroad for 30 years. The historic engines are two of only 18 in existence in the U.S. today.

In 1966, songwriting duo Tommy Boyce and Bobby Hart wrote a song which was inspired by the Clarkdale railroad system. According to Hart:

"We were just looking for a name that sounded good. There's a little town in northern Arizona I used to go through in the summer on the way to Oak Creek Canyon called Clarkdale. We were throwing out names, and when we got to Clarkdale, we thought Clarksville sounded even better."

The song "Last Train to Clarksville" was released August 16, 1966 and was the debut single by The Monkees. The song topped the Billboard Hot 100 on November 5, 1966.

The John Bell Railroad Museum is located in the Clarkdale depot complex. The museum displays rail artifacts, photographs and sculptures many of which were from Bell's personal collection.

Verde Canyon Railroad

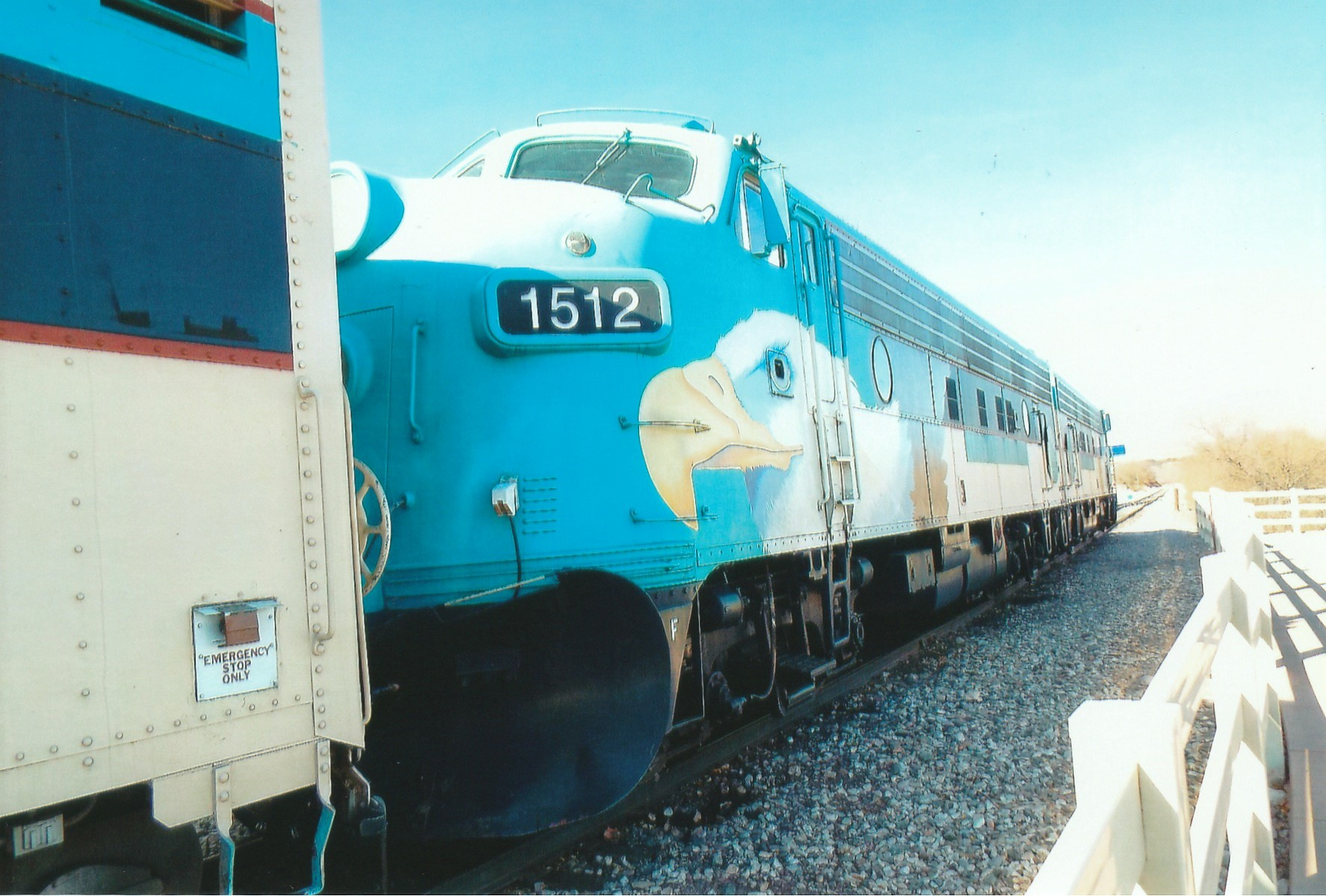
Verde Canyon Railroad engine #1512

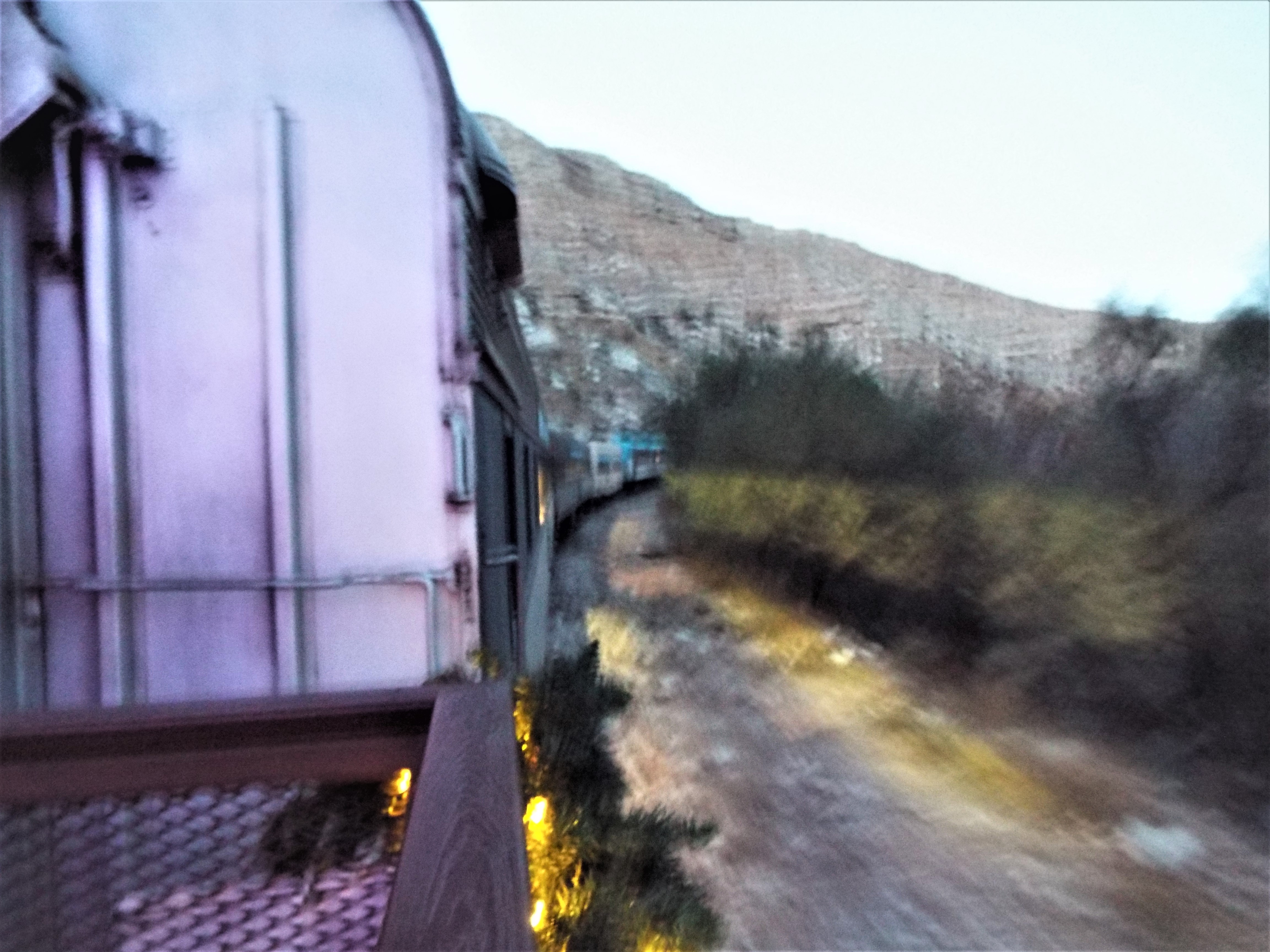
Verde Canyon Railroad on its way to Perkinsville

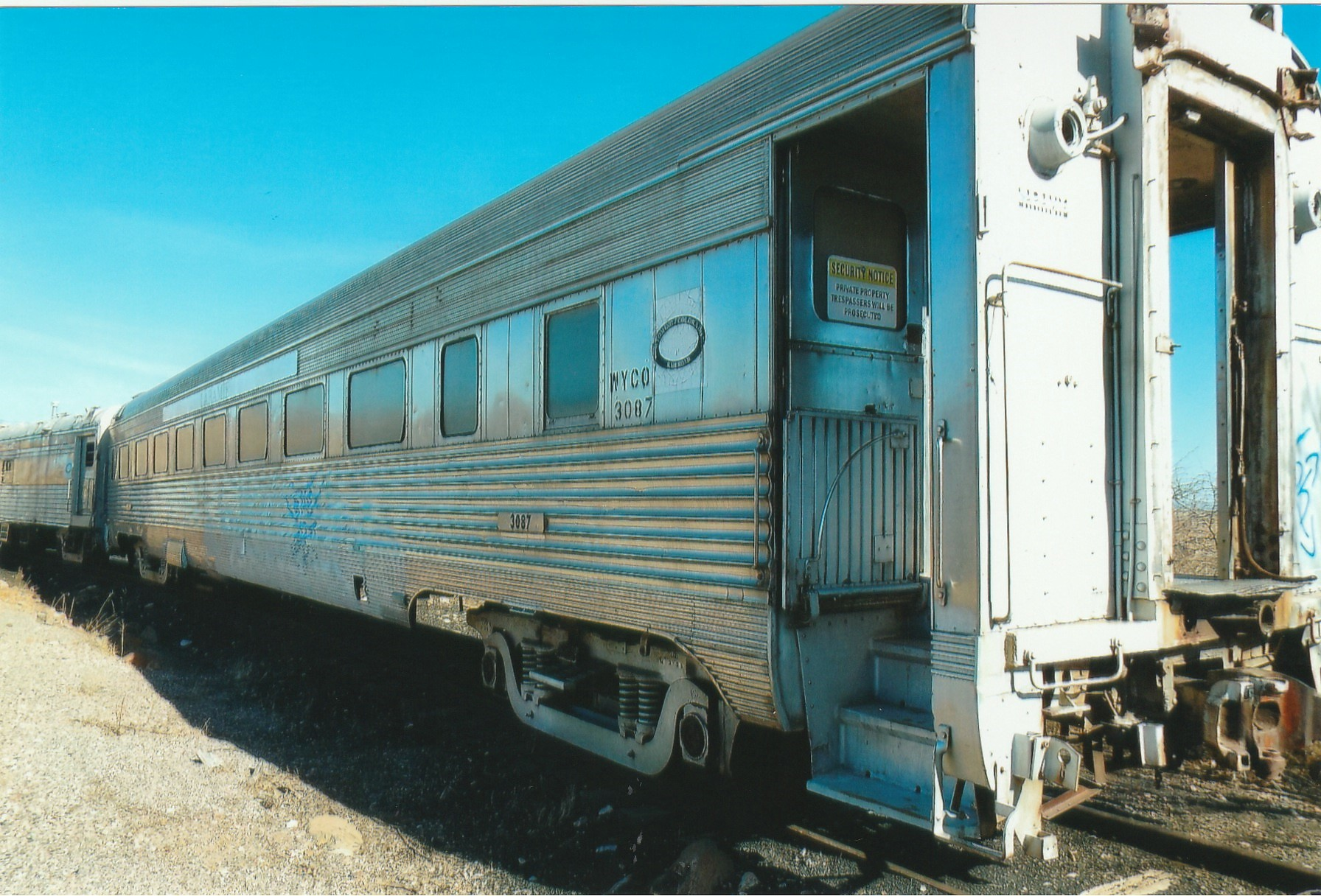
Abandoned Verde Railroad cars.

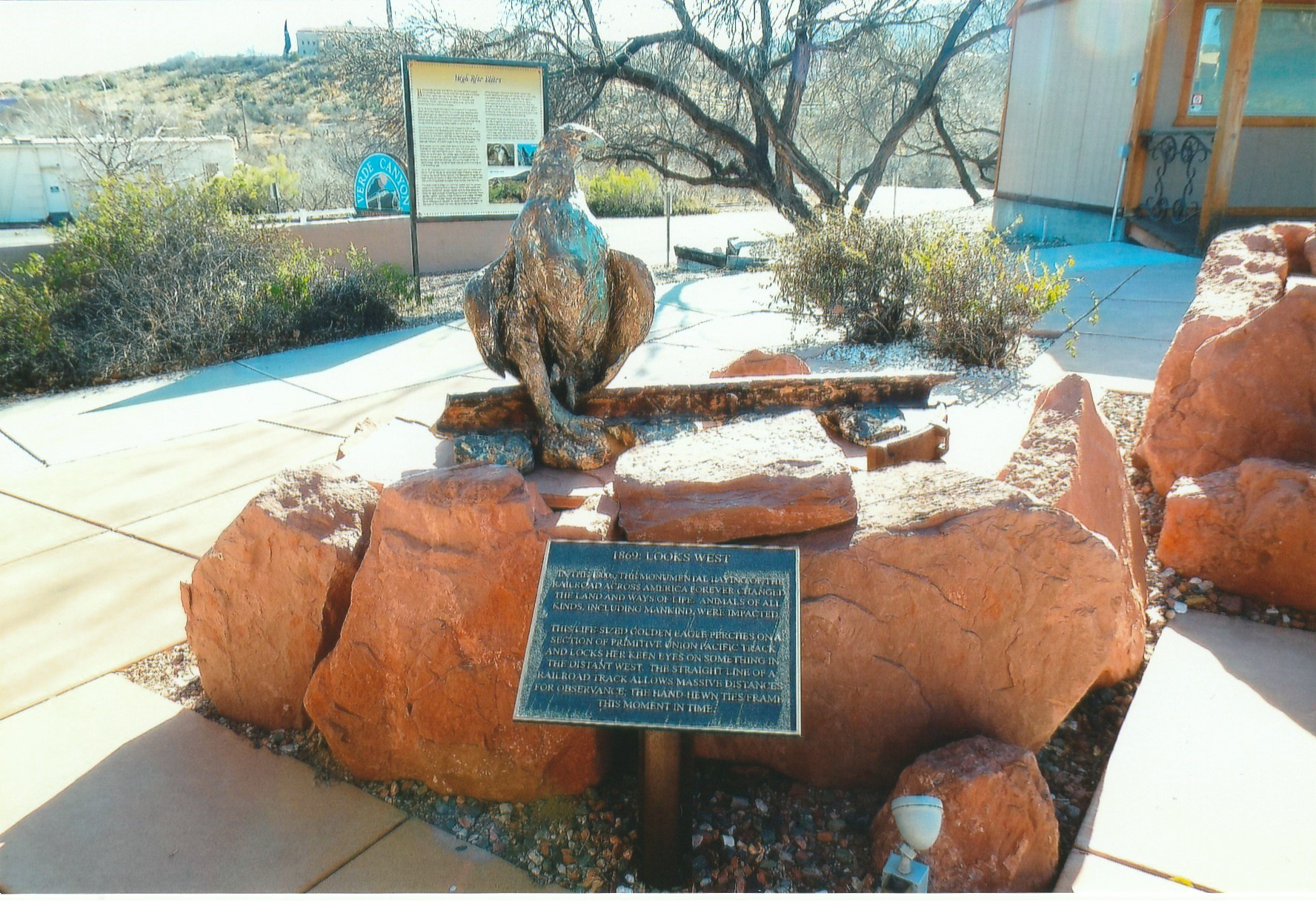
John Bell Railroad Museum's 1869 display "Looks West"

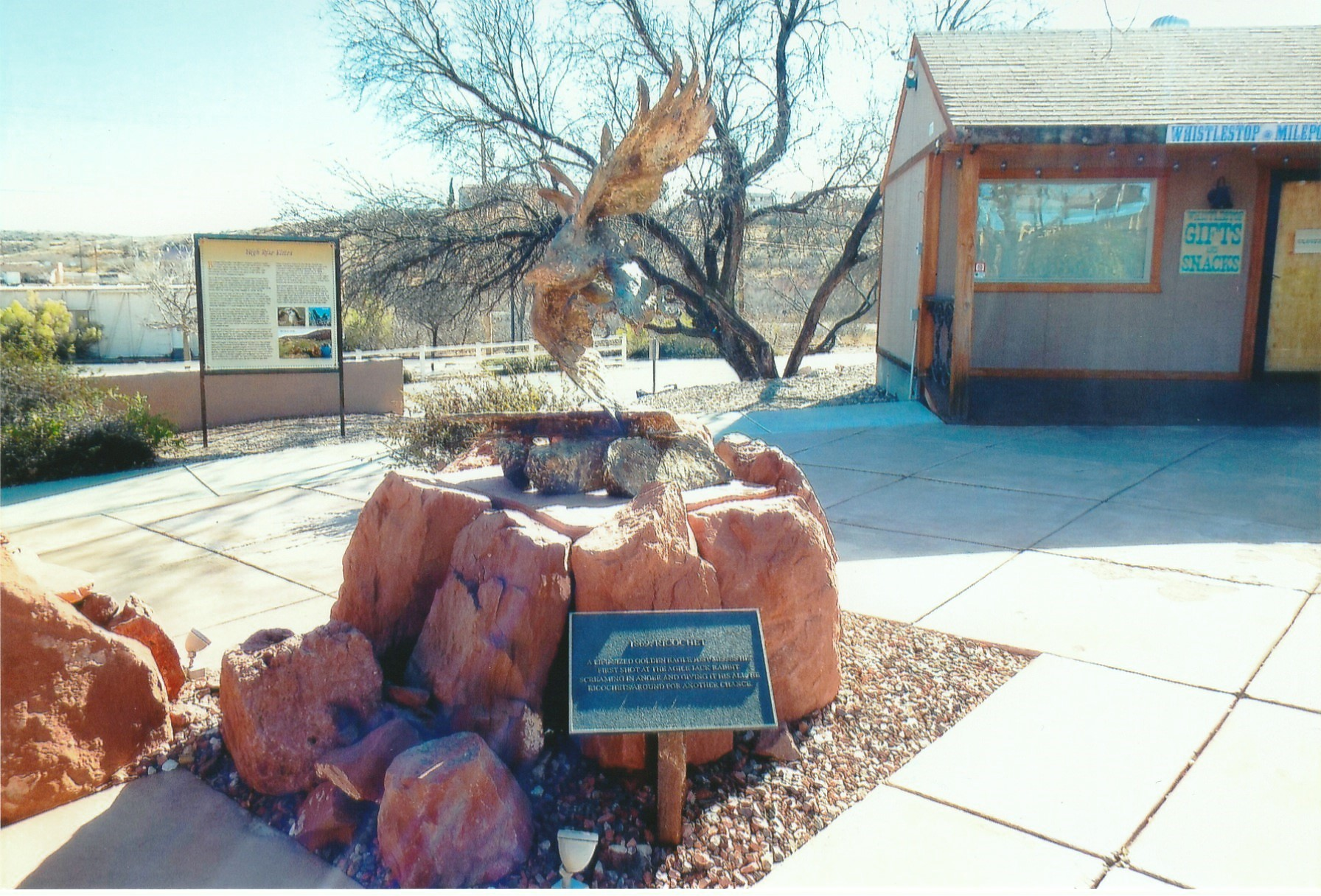
John Bell Railroad Museum's 1869 display "Ricochet"

== The Tuzigoot National Monument ==
The Tuzigoot National Monument is a small national monument where the remains of dwellings of the 12th century Sinagua Indians are preserved. The sandstone ridge where the cluster of the Sinagua buildings are located is close to the Verde River. The Tuzigoot National Monument has a small visitor center (museum) that contains a display of Indian artifacts which have been found on-site.

Tuzigoot National Monument

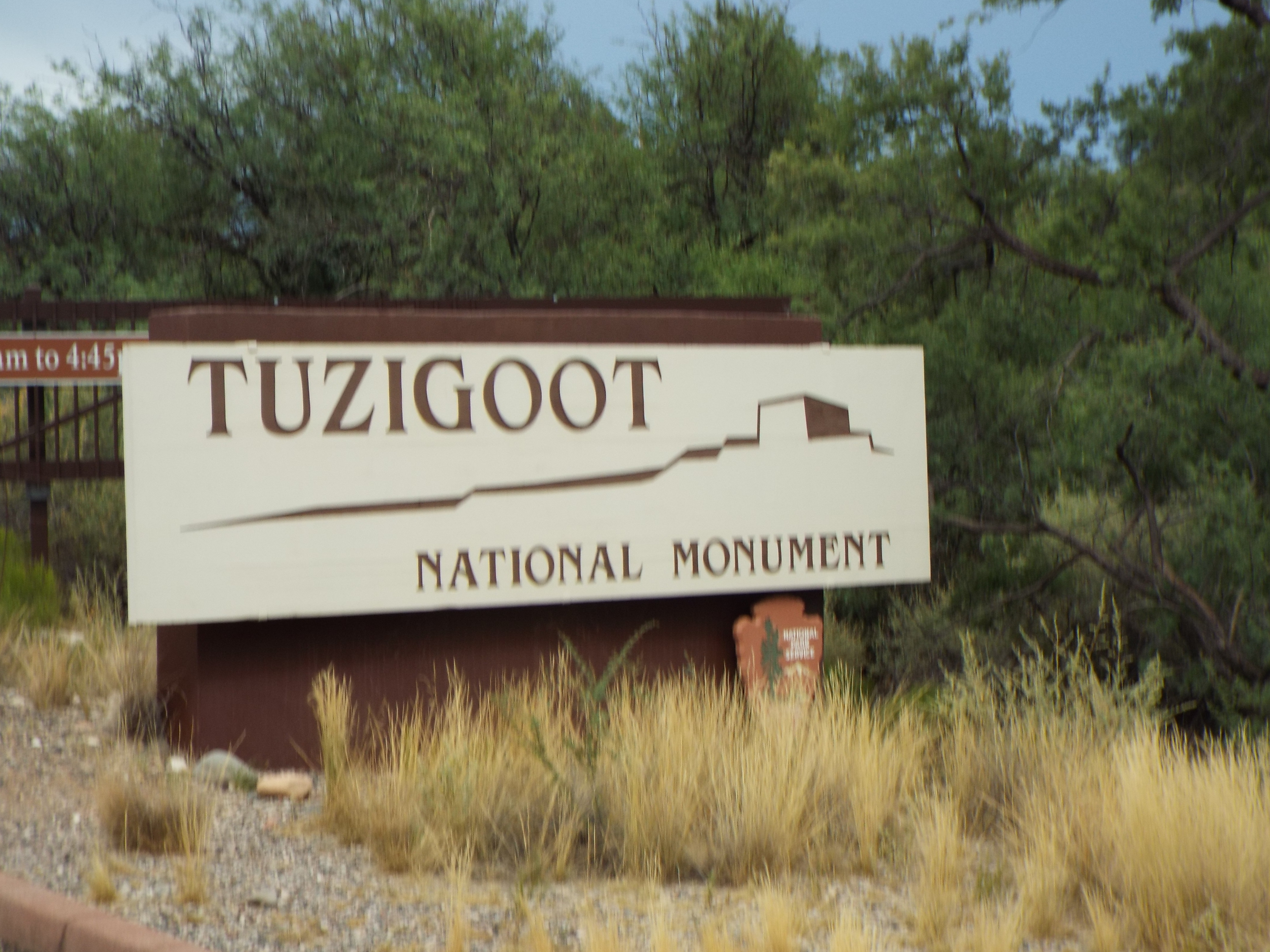
Tuzigoot National Monument

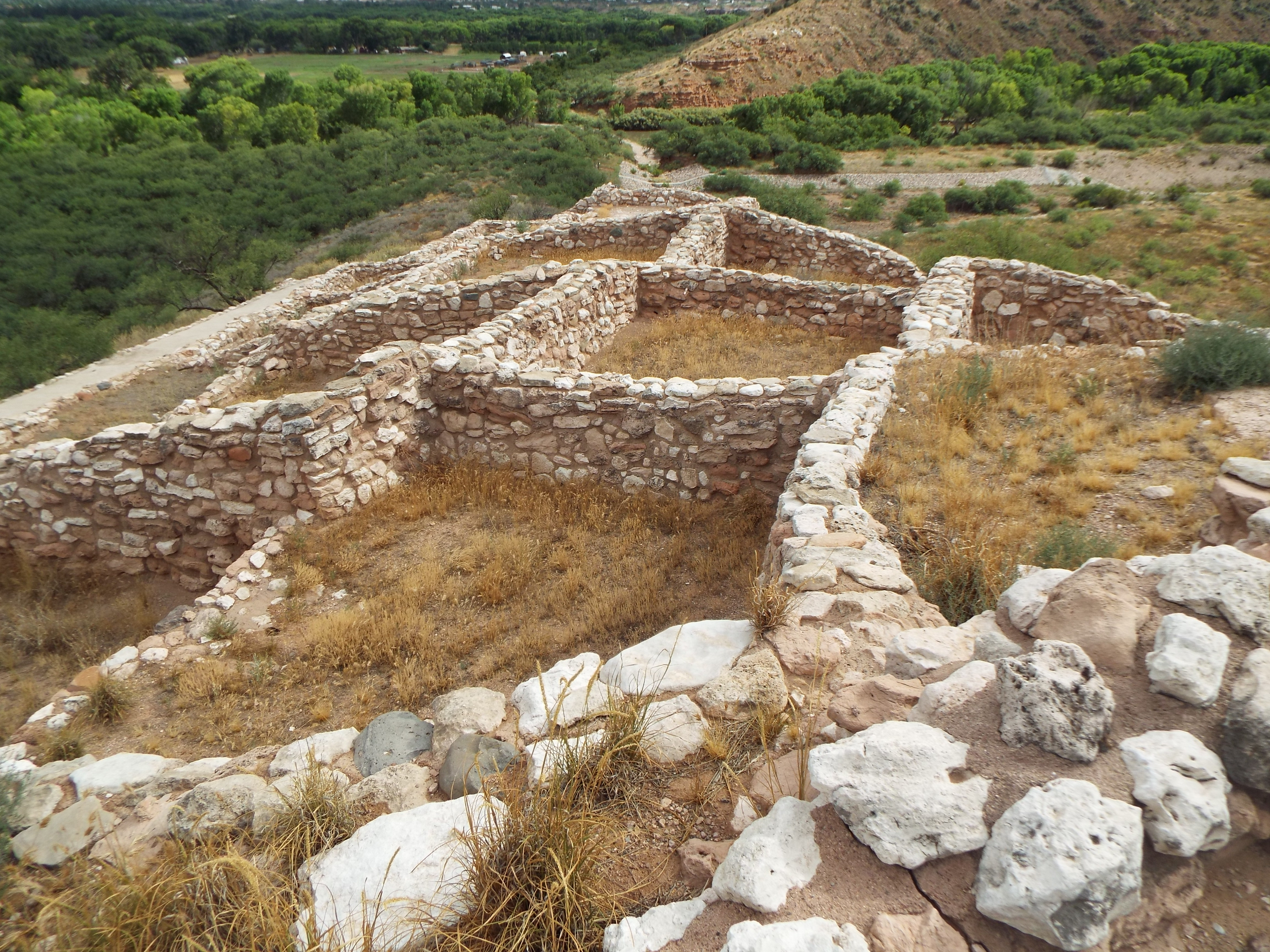

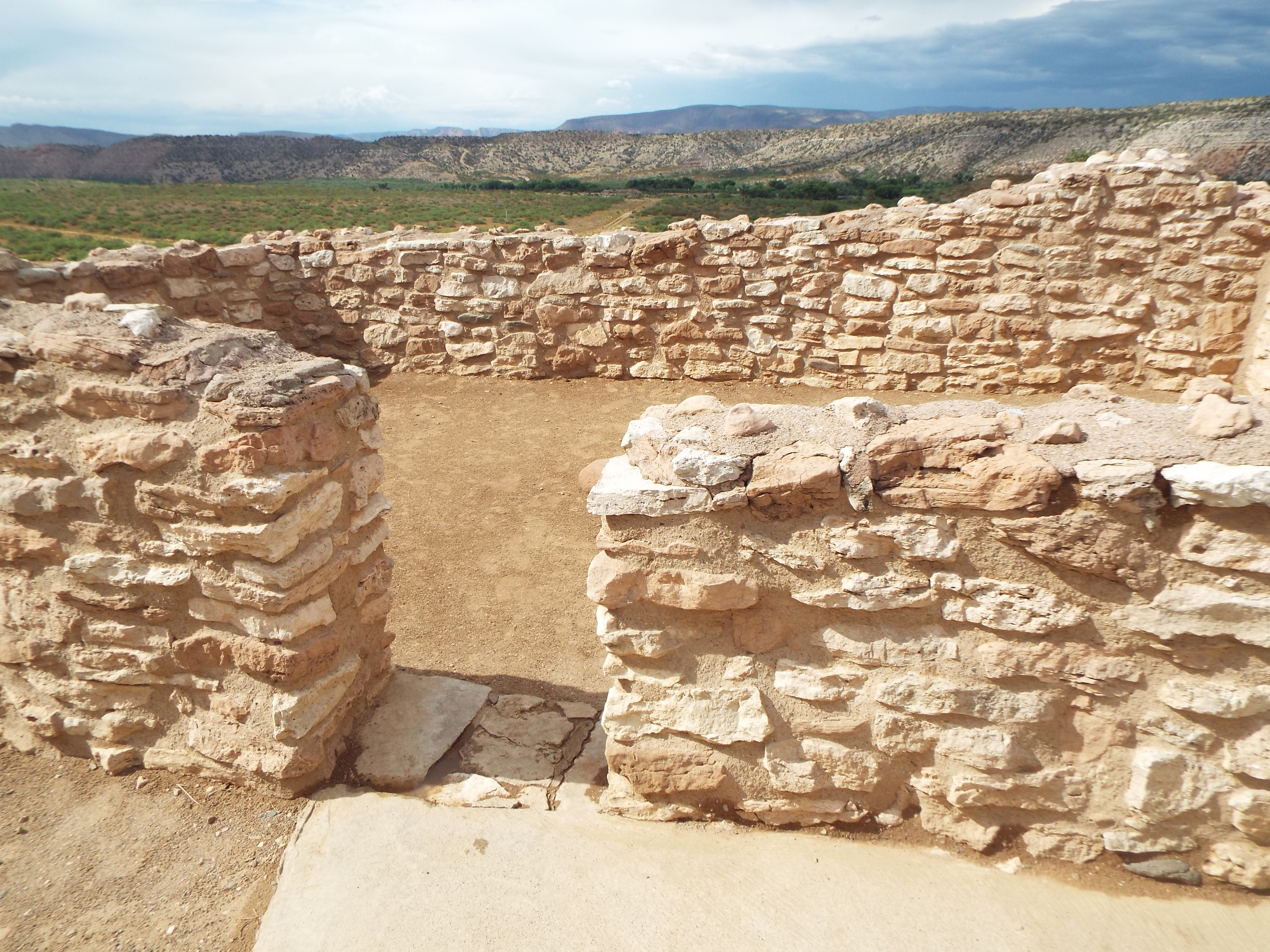

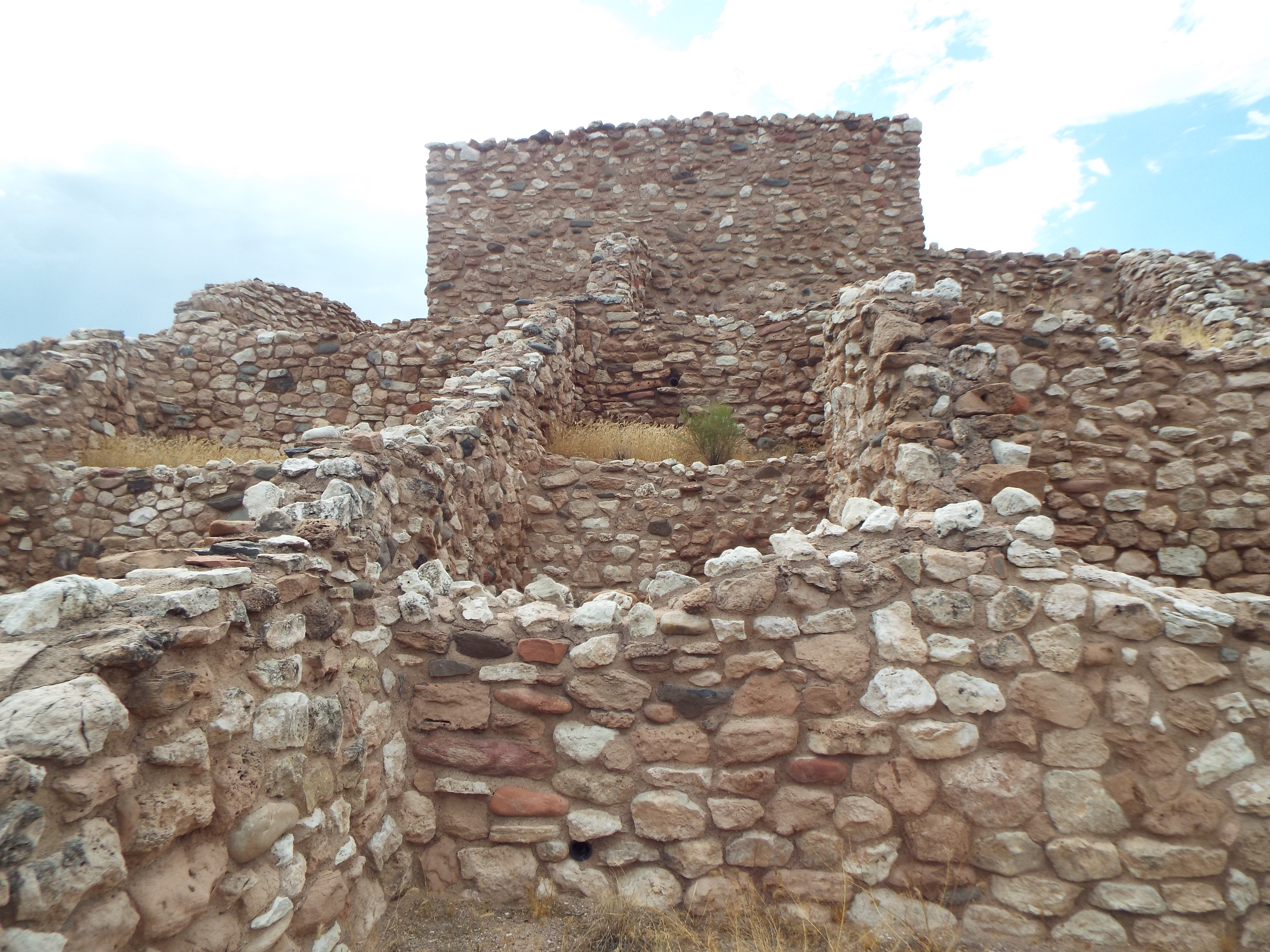

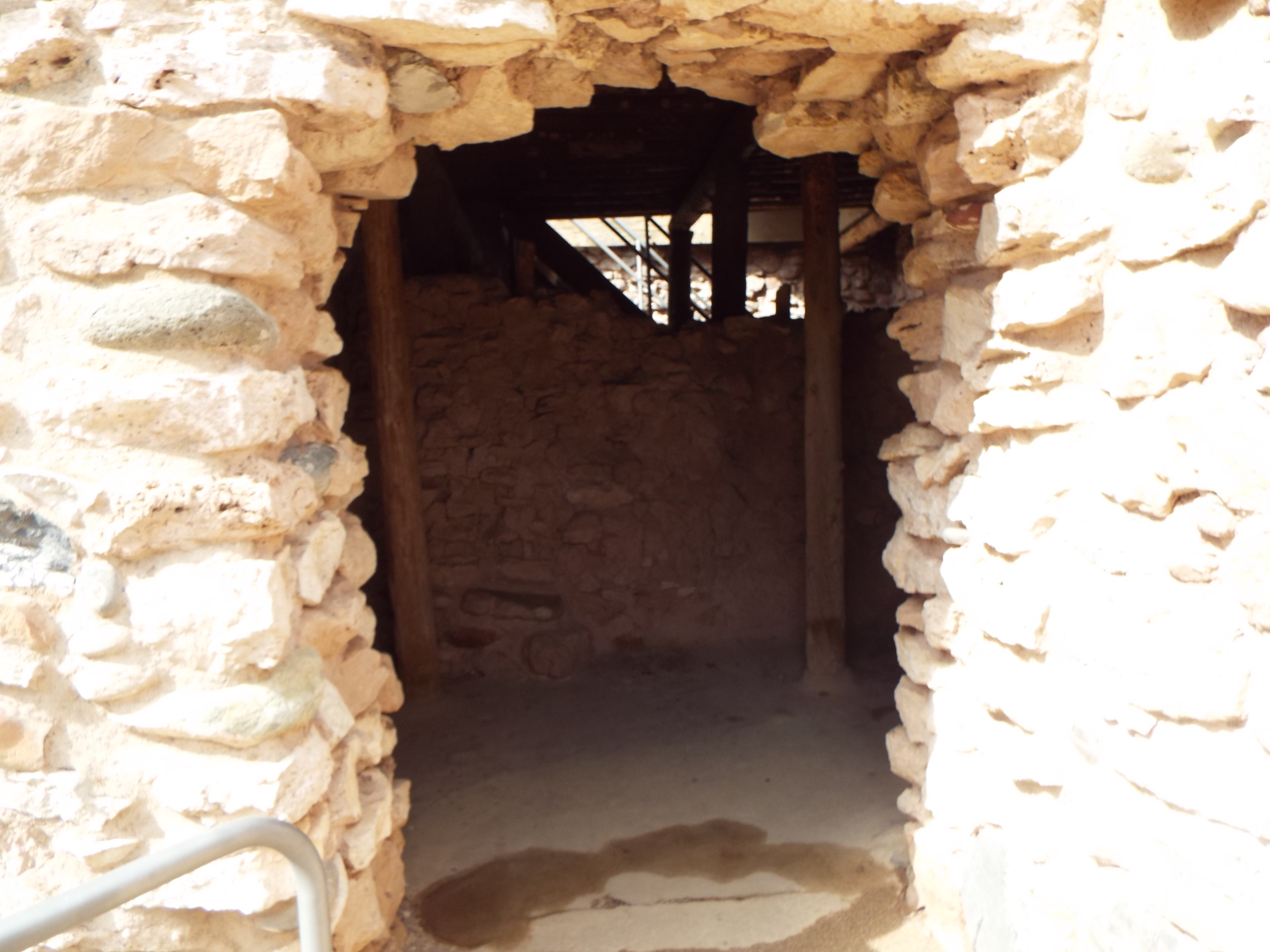

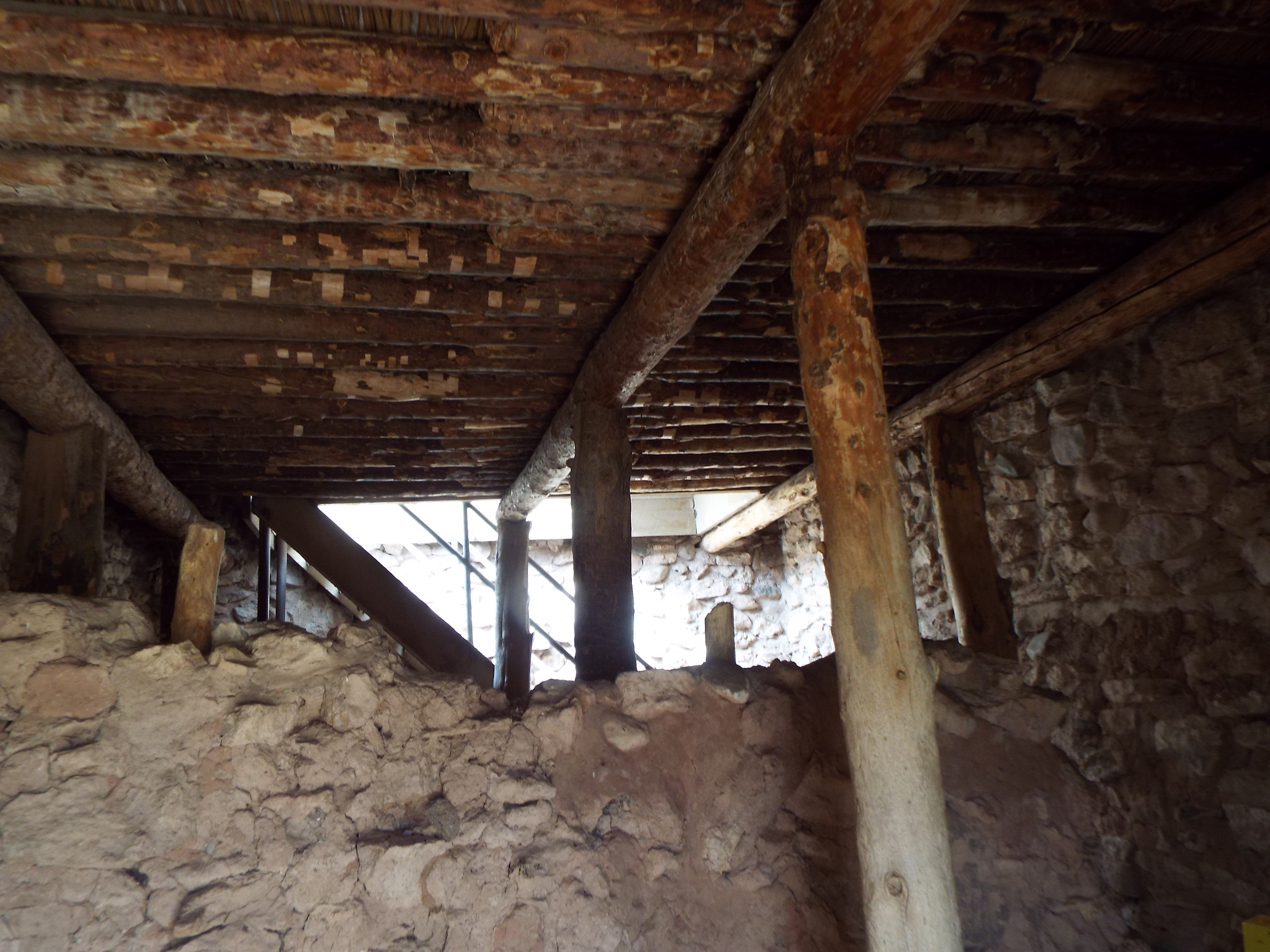

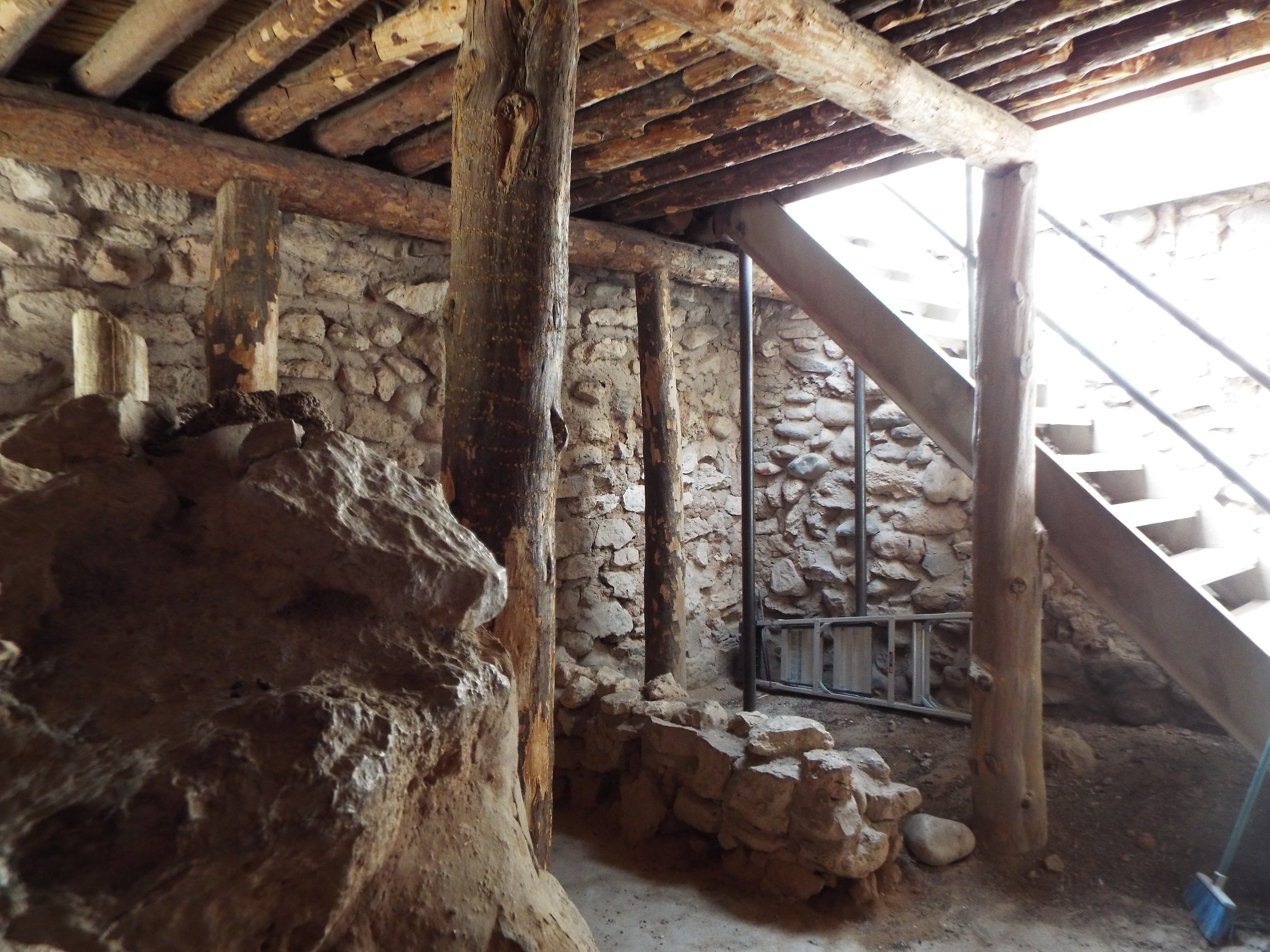

== See also ==
- Clarkdale, Arizona
- National Register of Historic Places listings in Yavapai County, Arizona
- Clarkdale Historic District (Clarkdale, Arizona)
