= Mi Sun Cho =

- Born: Seoul, South Korea
- Education: Lycée Français de Los Angeles; UCLA
- Board member of: YWCA Greater Los Angeles
- Spouse: Brian D. Johnson
- Children: 2
- Relatives: Gye-Jun Ryu (Great Grandfather) Paul K. Ryu (Great Uncle) Han-bin Lee Hwang Kyung Koh

Mi Sun Cho is a South Korean-born American. Cho has served as a spokesperson and activist for immigrant and women's rights in Los Angeles, California.

== Early life and education ==
Cho was born in Seoul, South Korea. She is the great-grand daughter of Gye-Jun Ryu and the grand-niece of Paul K. Ryu. Cho was educated in the United States at Lycée Francais de Los Angeles and University of California, Los Angeles where she received a degree in engineering.

== Career ==
Cho has been a member of the Board of Directors for the YWCA of Los Angeles, Vice Price of the Koreatown Youth and Community Center, and Executive Director of the Korean American Family Service Center in Los Angeles, California.

In 1986, Cho was appointed to the United Nations Commission on the Status of Women by Mayor Tom Bradley. The Commission, established in 1975, assists in assuring all women the opportunity for full and equal participation in the affairs of city government and promotes the general welfare of women in the Los Angeles community.
