= Han-bin Lee =

South Korean politician

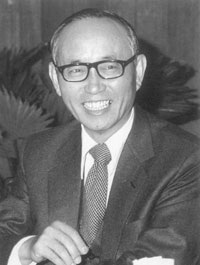

Acting Prime Minister of South Korea
- In office 5 December 1979 – 20 December 1979
- President: Choi Kyu-hah
- Preceded by: Choi Kyu-hah
- Succeeded by: Shin Hyun-hwak

Deputy Prime Minister of South Korea and Minister for Economic Planning Board
- In office 13 December 1979 – 22 May 1980
- President: Choi Kyu-hah
- Prime Minister: Shin Hyun-hwak
- Preceded by: Shin Hyun-hwak
- Succeeded by: Kim Won-ki

Personal details
- Born: 9 February 1926
- Died: 21 January 2004 (aged 77)
- Relatives: Hanju Lee; Paul K. Ryu; Hwang Kyung Koh; Mi Sun Cho
- Education: Seoul National University (BA, PhD); Harvard University (MBA)

Korean name
- Hangul: 이한빈
- Hanja: 李漢彬
- RR: I Hanbin
- MR: I Hanbin

Han-bin Lee (Note: Sometimes written Lee Han-bin or Hahn-Been Lee) (Korean: 이한빈) was a South Korean politician and diplomat who served as the deputy prime minister of South Korea from 1979 to 1980.

Lee served as South Korea's Ambassador to Switzerland from 1963 to 1965. During this time Lee was instrumental in establishing the Embassy of the Republic of Korea in Switzerland. In 1979, Lee became South Korea's 14th Deputy Prime Minister of the Fourth Republic of Korea. As Deputy Prime Minister and minister of the Economic Planning Board of Korea, Lee contributed to maintaining Korea's economic stability by leading the nation's economic policies.

The Lee Han-bin Hope Scholarship at Seoul National University provides student scholarships to the Graduate School of Public Administration.

== Works ==
- Administrative reforms in Asia
- A Handbook of Development Administration Curriculum
- A case of institution building on the foundation of a university technical assistance contract
- An application of innovation theory to the strategy of administrative reform in developing countries
- The role of the higher civil service under rapid social and political change
- Developmentalist time and leadership in developing countries
- Generating momentum toward a Pacific community
- Goals for the Pacific community in the 21st century
- A thematic approach to program development : the case of the East-West Technology Development Institute
- An Application of Innovation Theory to the Strategy of Administrative Reform in Developing Countries

== See also ==
- Prime Minister of South Korea
- List of prime ministers of South Korea
- Foreign relations of South Korea
