= Kim Sam-sun =

South Korean mycologist (1909–2001)

Kim Sam-sun (Korean: 김삼순; 1909–2001) was a South Korean mycologist. In 1966, she became the first Korean woman to earn a doctorate in agricultural science.

== Life and career ==
Kim was born in Damyang County. She studied botany at Hokkaido Imperial University, graduating in 1943, and received her doctorate from Kyushu University in 1966. Her doctoral research concerned the enzyme Taka-amylase A.

She became a professor at Seoul National University in 1946 and joined Seoul Women's University in 1968. Her research helped develop oyster mushroom cultivation in South Korea. In 1972, she founded the Korean Society of Mycology and became its first president.

Kim retired in 1974 but continued her research in Damyang. In 1990, she and Kim Yang-seop published an illustrated guide to 325 species of Korean mushrooms.
