= Paul K. Ryu =

South Korean-American legal scholar (1915–1998)

- 劉基天
- Born: July 5, 1915
- Died: June 27, 1998 (aged 82)
- Education: University of Tokyo; Yale Law School
- Occupations: President, Seoul National University; Dean, Seoul National University Law School
- Spouse: Helen Silving-Ryu
- Relatives: Gye-Jun Ryu (Father) Mi Sun Cho (Grand Niece); Whitney Noelle Mogavero (Great Grand Niece); Han-bin Lee (Brother-In-Law) Hwang Kyung Koh (Sister-In-Law)

Paul K. Ryu (also known as Ryu Kichyun and Ki-chʻŏn Yu) is a South Korean-American legal scholar. Ryu served as the ninth president of Seoul National University and the sixth dean of Seoul National University School of Law.

The name Paul K. Ryu is included in the Encyclopedia of World Intellectuals.

== Education ==
Ryu Kicheon was born in 1915 to a devout Protestant family in Pyongyang. Ryu was the fourth son of six children. After the Liberation of Korea, Ryu laid the foundation for legal education in Korea as Dean and President of Seoul National University.

In 1958, Ryu became the first Korean to obtain a Doctor of Jurisprudence (SJD) degree from Yale University.

== Career ==
Ryu served as the sixth dean of Seoul National University Law School from July 1962 to August 1965. Through Ryu's leadership as SNU's Law School Dean, SNU's Graduate School of Law (today known as the Judicial Research and Training Institute) was established to directly connect the legal education at SNU Law School and the education for the members of the judiciary. On August 27, 1965, Ryu was named president of Seoul National University. .

On August 27, 1965, Ryu was named president of Seoul National University.

Ryu was a libertarian and fought for a free society at a time when South Korea was in turmoil. Ryu's relationship with South Korean President Park Chung-hee turned sour after he became a vocal critic of the dictatorship. Ryu left Korea for the United States in 1972 fearing persecution from Korea's spy agency for his public criticism of Park. After the assassination of President Park Chung-hee in October 1979 Ryu returned to Seoul and resumed his teaching job at Seoul National University . Ryu's return to Seoul was cut short after military dictator Chun Doo-hwan ascended to power through a military coup. Fearing the fallout of the political change, Ryu returned to California where he spent the rest of his life.

Ryu's body was returned to Korea after his death. Ryu and his wife, Helen Silving are buried in their family cemetery in Goyang, South Korea.

== Personal life ==
On January 3, 1959, Ryu married Helen Silving at the home of New York University's chancellor, George D. Stoddard. Silving and Ryu met while teaching at Harvard University.

== Major publications ==
- Paul K. Ryu, Helen Silving (1964). Nullum Crimen Sine Actu
- Paul K. Ryu (2014).세계혁명(개정판)(양장본 HardCover)
- Paul K. Ryu, Helen Silving. International Criminal Law — A Search for Meaning
- Paul K. Ryu (1958). Causation in Criminal Law
- Paul K. Ryu, Helen Silving. The Foundations of Democracy - Its Origins and Essential Ingredients
- Paul K. Ryu, Helen Silving. ERROR JURIS: A COMPARATIVE STUDY.
