= Clark Memorial Library =

Clark Memorial Library may refer to:

- William Andrews Clark Memorial Library, a library affiliated with the University of California, Los Angeles
- Clark Memorial Library, a library in Richmond, Rhode Island
