= Hollywood studios =

Hollywood studios may refer to:

- Cinema of the United States, collectively referred to as "Hollywood", referring to an area of Los Angeles, California
- Universal Studios Hollywood, a production facility and theme park in Hollywood
- Disney's Hollywood Studios, a theme park within Walt Disney World in Bay Lake, Florida
- Hollywood Studio Symphony
- Hollywood Studio Club
- Hollywood Center Studios
