= YWCA Greater Los Angeles =

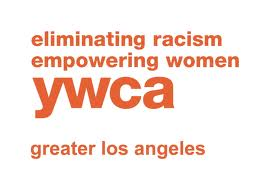
- Established: 1894
- Location: Los Angeles, California, US
- Staff: Sharon Shelton, Interim CEO
- Website: www.YWCAGLA.org

YWCA Greater Los Angeles is a charitable organization with a focus on addressing issues of poverty, homelessness, domestic violence and skills training for the community.

== Description ==
The Los Angeles YWCA has operated for more than one hundred years with programs in community advocacy, Child development services, Sexual Assault Crisis Counseling program", the Empowerment Project for Senior Citizens, Youth Education and recreation training as well as the L.A. Job Corps program.

== History ==
Founded in 1894, the YWCA Greater Los Angeles serving the needs of women and their families in the Los Angeles community is modeled after the national Young Women's Christian Association which is a membership movement dedicated to the concept of empowering women by creating opportunities for growth, leadership and eliminating racism.

In 1913 the Mary Andrews Clark Memorial Home began serving as an Institution of "Comfort and Uplifting", which served as an affordable residence for working girls until 1987. In 1918 the YWCA took control of The Hollywood Studio Club a hotel residence for aspiring actresses.

In 1953 the Compton development Center was established with programs designed for teens. In the late 1950s, the YWCA Greater Los Angeles began operation of a transient hotel for women and in 1965 the first Los Angeles Job Corps Center opened. By the late 1960s the YWCA established both the East Los Angeles and the Angeles Mesa Activity Centers.

By the late 1970s, the Infant Learning Center at San Fernando High School was opened in 1975 as the L.A. Job Corps program continued to grow and expand when it moved into the Hollywood Studio Club. In the early 1980s, the YWCA began child development and lLtchkey Services in thirteen area elementary schools within the Los Angeles Unified School District. In 1985 the Compton Center began counseling programs for women who were survivors of sexual assault which continued until the building was sold in 1993.

The YWCA became the lead agency for the "LA Bridges After School Program" at L.A.'s John Muir Middle School in 1998. The YWCA Greater Los Angeles was granted an extended five-year contract in 2000 for the operation of the LA Job Corps program from the Department of Labor.

In 2001, the organization created an Urban Campus Project focused on housing, health and medical services, charter high school, and vocational services. They also founded the Society of Benefactrix, which was launched in support of the YWCA's philosophical ideals and programs. In 2003, the Union Pacific Child Development Center in East Los Angeles was opened.

In 2009, the first "Jeans 4 Justice" event was held. On April 1, 2012, the YWCA Greater Los Angeles moved into their Urban Campus Building at 1020 Olive Street, Los Angeles along with the LA Job Corps

== Phenomenal Woman of the Year ==
The YWCA Greater Los Angeles each year presents its award for Phenomenal Woman. The 2011 honoree was actress/model Kathy Ireland and local politician Jan Perry. The 2012 award went to SEIU - Butler United Long Term Care Workers' Union President, Laphonza Butler.
