= William A. Clark =

American mining magnate and politician (1839–1925)

William Andrews Clark
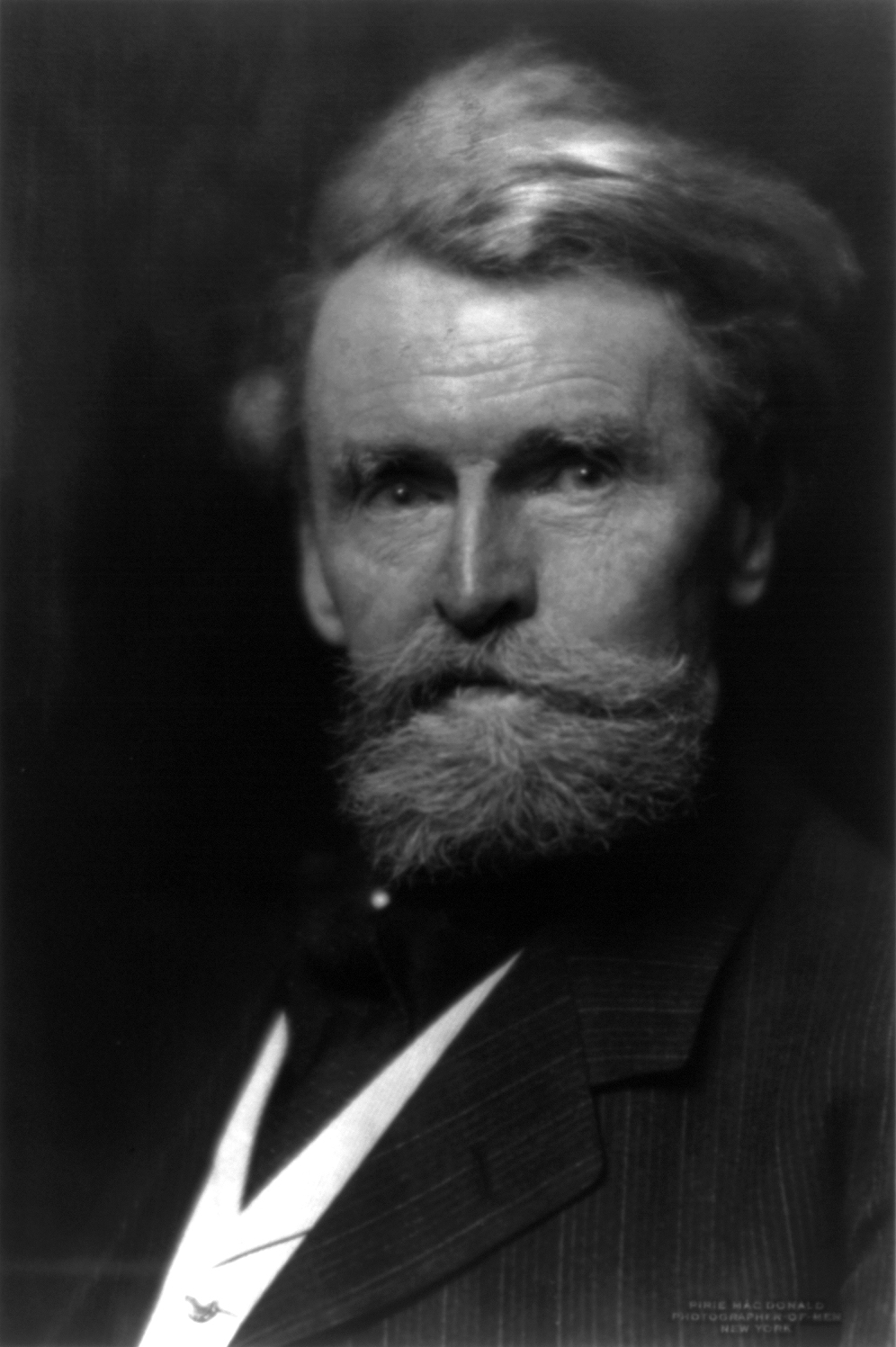
- Clark in 1917

United States Senator from Montana
- In office March 4, 1901 – March 3, 1907
- Preceded by: Thomas H. Carter
- Succeeded by: Joseph M. Dixon
- In office March 4, 1899 – May 15, 1900
- Preceded by: Lee Mantle
- Succeeded by: Paris Gibson

Personal details
- Born: January 8, 1839 Connellsville, Pennsylvania, U.S.
- Died: March 2, 1925 (aged 86) New York City, U.S.
- Resting place: Woodlawn Cemetery
- Party: Democratic
- Spouses: Katherine Stauffer (m. 1869; died 1893) Anna LaChapelle (m. 1901)
- Children: 9, five lived to adulthood: Mary Joaquina, Charles, Katherine Louise, William, Huguette
- Education: Iowa Wesleyan University Columbia University

William Andrews Clark Sr. (January 8, 1839 – March 2, 1925) was an American mining magnate, entrepreneur and politician who was known as one of Montana's Copper Kings alongside Marcus Daly, and F. Augustus Heinze. He was a U.S. Senator from Montana from 1901 to 1907.

== Biography ==
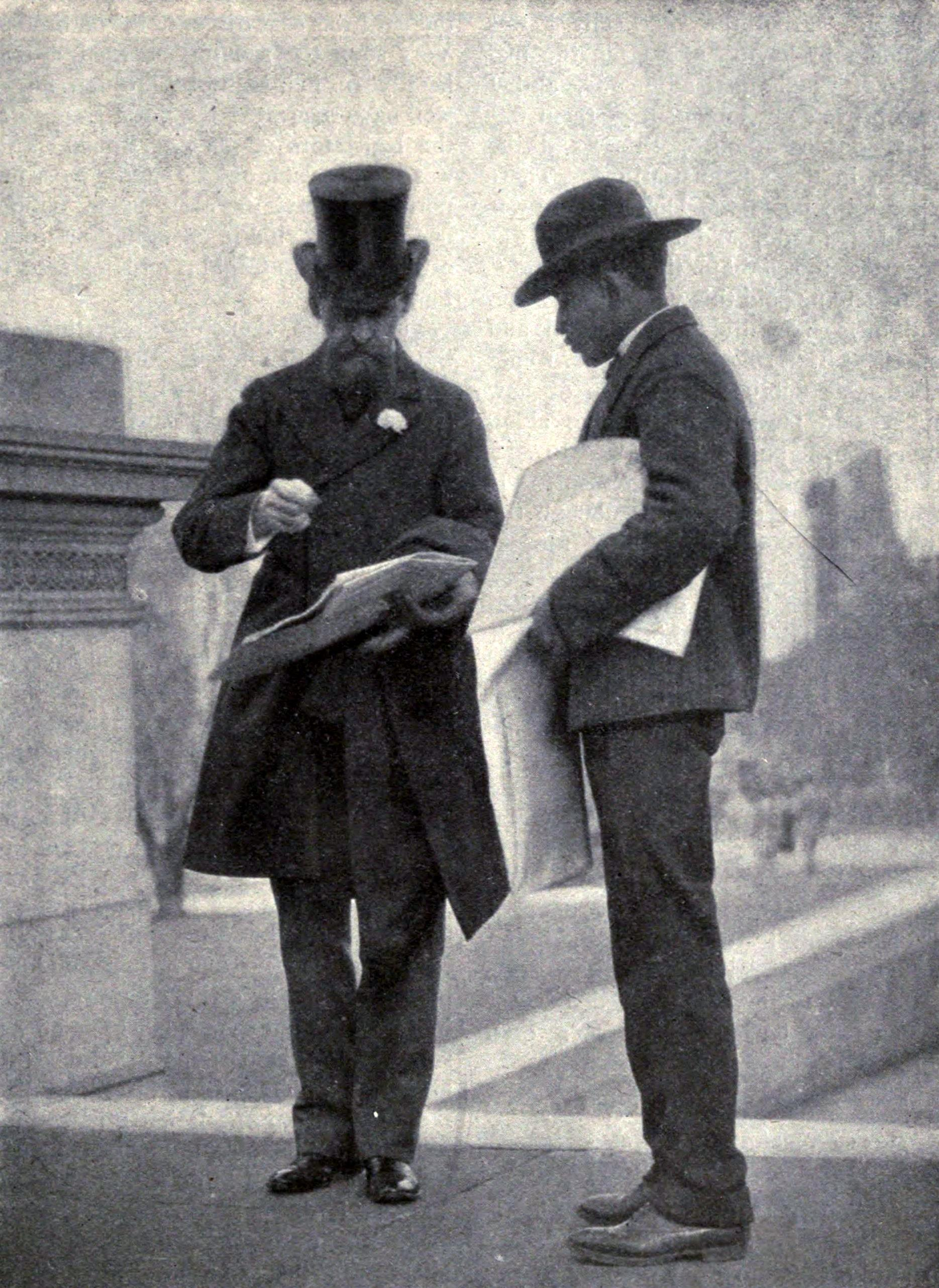
Clark buying a newspaper, c. 1906

Clark was born in Connellsville, Pennsylvania, in 1839 to John Clark and Mary Andrews, both of Scotch-Irish descent; his mother also claimed a strain of Huguenot ancestry. He moved with his family to Iowa in 1856 where he taught school and studied law at Iowa Wesleyan College. In 1862, he traveled west to become a miner. After working in quartz mines in Colorado, Clark made his way to new gold fields in 1863 to find his fortune in the Montana gold rush.

He settled in the capital of Montana Territory, Bannack, Montana, and began placer mining. Though his claim paid only moderately, Clark took on additional grunt work and invested his earnings in becoming a trader, driving mules back and forth between Salt Lake City and the boomtowns of Montana to transport eggs and other basic supplies. He undertook mail carrying contracts and ferried post from Walla Walla, Washington, to Missoula, Montana, for three years with his brothers.

Clark moved to and expanded into banking in Deer Lodge, Montana. His bank foreclosed on many properties during the mineral busts, and he became more and more invested into mining. He continued to expand his mercantile businesses during this time as well.

Clark took his young family to New York City in the 1870s, and studied mining and mineralogy at what is now Columbia University. He travelled extensively in all areas between coasts of the United States and Hawaii, and made trips to Europe once or twice a year. He made a fortune with copper mining, smelters, electric power companies, newspapers, railroads (trolley and rail lines around Butte and other parts of Montana and the San Pedro, Los Angeles and Salt Lake Railroad from Salt Lake City to San Pedro and Los Angeles, California), banking, land development, commercial sales, agriculture and timber enterprises, and railroads. He became known as one of three major "Copper Kings" of Butte, Montana, along with Marcus Daly and F. Augustus Heinze.

The November 1903 Congressional Directory inaccurately claimed that Clark "was a major of a battalion that pursued Chief Joseph and his band in the Nez Perces invasion of 1877." In reality, Clark had led a medical relief mission after the battle.

== Political career ==
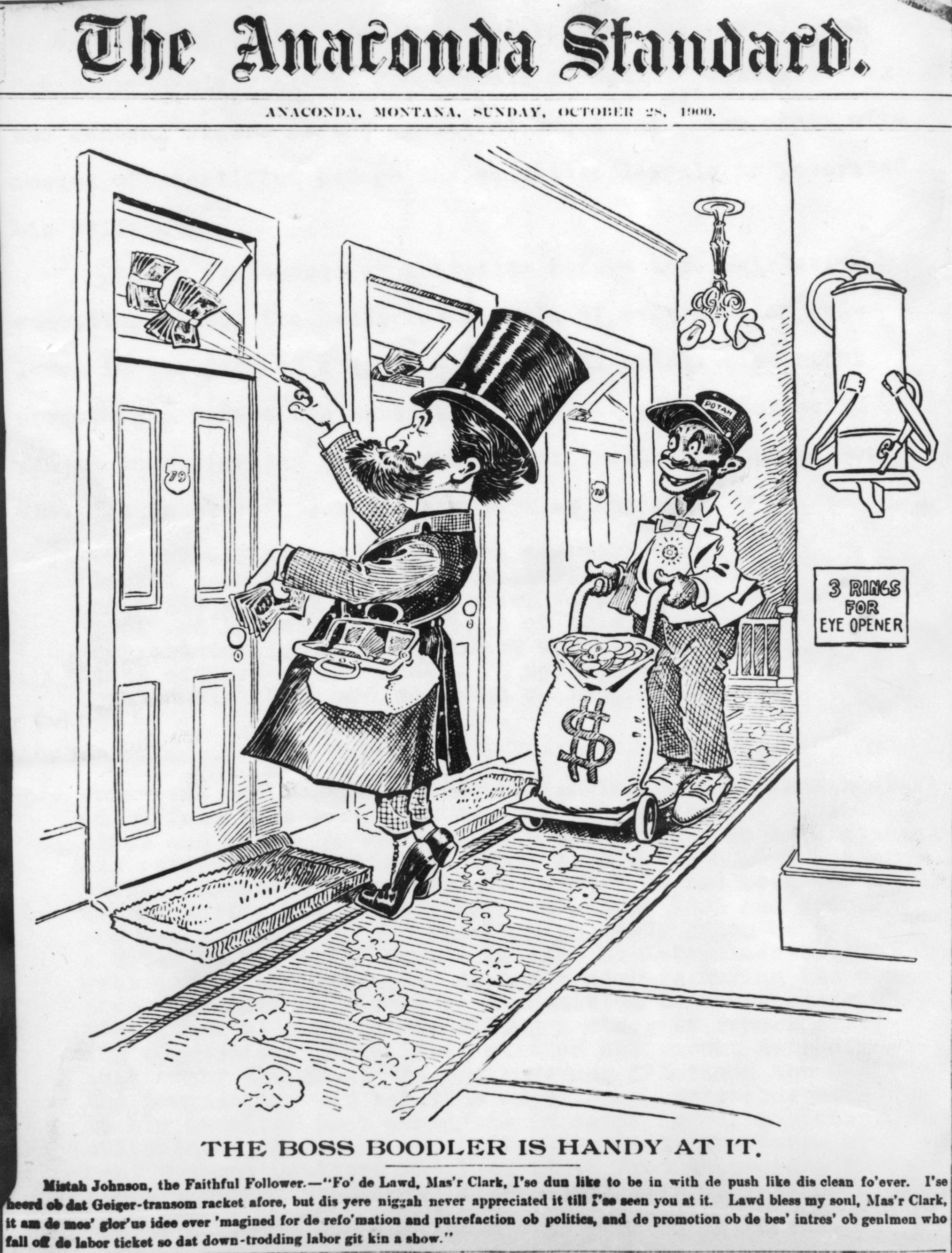
Political cartoon depicting Clark bribing state legislators, October 1900

Clark was twice named president of Montana Constitutional Conventions, in 1884 and 1889. He yearned to be a statesman, and used his newspaper, the Butte Miner, to push his political ambitions. At this time, Butte was one of the largest cities in the West. He gained popularity in Helena, Montana, by campaigning for its selection as the state capital instead of Anaconda. This battle for the placement of the capital had subtle Irish vs. English, Catholic vs. Protestant, and non-Masonic vs. Masonic elements.

Clark's longstanding dream of becoming a United States senator resulted in scandal in 1899 when it was revealed that he had bribed members of the Montana State Legislature in return for their votes. At the time, U.S. senators were chosen by their respective state legislatures. The corruption of his election contributed to the passage of the Seventeenth Amendment. The U.S. Senate and a Republican Congress refused to seat Democrat Clark due to the 1899 bribery scheme. When Montana's governor left the state temporarily to transfer a mining claim in San Francisco, the lieutenant governor surreptitiously appointed Clark to fill the Senate vacancy, but on the governor's return, Clark's hoped-for appointment was fully quashed. A later senate campaign was successful, and he served a single term from 1901 to 1907. In responding to criticism of his bribery of the Montana legislature, Clark is widely reported to have said, "I never bought a man who wasn't for sale."

Clark died at the age of 86 in his New York City mansion. His estate at his death was estimated to be worth $300 million (equivalent to $4.38 billion in 2025), making him one of the wealthiest Americans ever.

In a 1907 essay, Mark Twain, who was a close friend and also benefactee of Clark's rival, Henry H. Rogers, an organizer of the Amalgamated Copper Mining Company, portrayed Clark as the very embodiment of Gilded Age excess and corruption:

He is as rotten a human being as can be found anywhere under the flag; he is a shame to the American nation, and no one has helped to send him to the Senate who did not know that his proper place was the penitentiary, with a ball and chain on his legs. To my mind he is the most disgusting creature that the republic has produced since Tweed's time.

Clark served a full term without much particular distinction, though he was active as a senator, particularly in issues that were important to his business, including land use and irrigation.

== Death ==
Clark died of pneumonia on March 2, 1925, at his lavish 121-room mansion on Fifth Avenue in New York City. He was 86. According to reports at the time, he had contracted a cold just a few days prior but succumbed suddenly while surrounded by his family. Clark died as one of the richest men in this gilded era, and is interred at Woodlawn Cemetery in the Bronx, New York City.

== Family ==
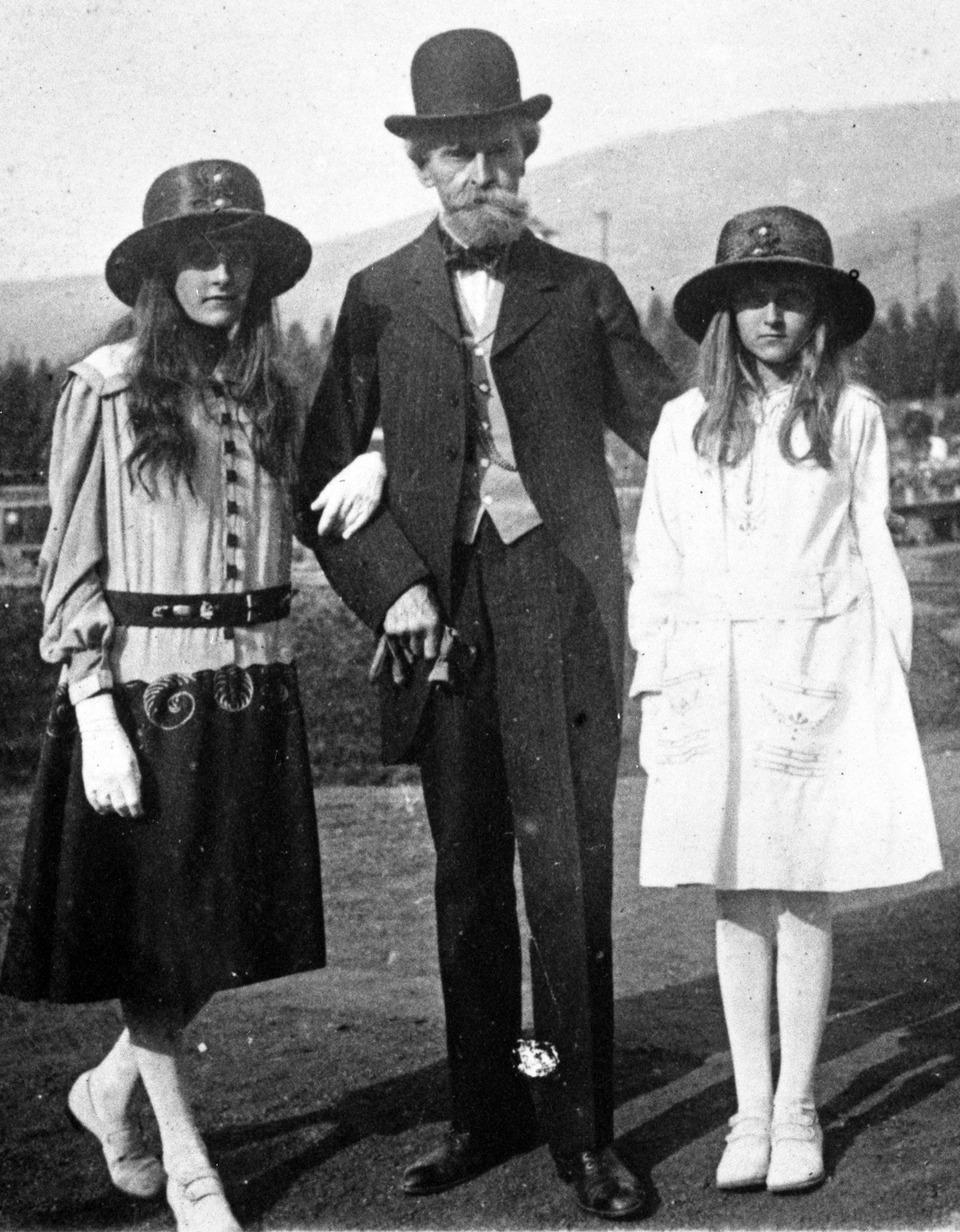
Clark with his daughters Andrée (left) and Huguette (right), c. 1917 at Columbia Gardens

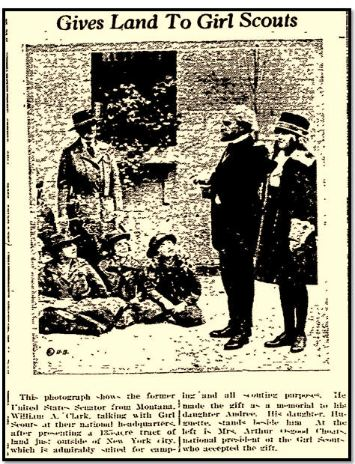
Clark in November 1920 with his daughter, Huguette, donating 135 acres to the Girl Scouts after the death of his daughter Andrée, which was named Camp Andree Clark

Clark was married twice. His first marriage was to Katherine Louise "Kate" Stauffer whom he knew from Connellsville in 1869, they were married until her death in 1893. Together, they had seven children:

- Mary Joaquina Clark (1870–1939)
- Charles Walker "Charlie" Clark (1871–1933)
- Infant Clark (1874–1874)
- Jessie Clark (1875–1878)
- Katherine Stauffer Clarks (1875–1974)
- William Andrews Clark Jr. (1877–1934)
- Francis Paul Clark (1880–1896)

After Kate's death in 1893, William married his second wife, the woman who had been one of many teenage wards of Clark, Anna Eugenia LaChapelle (March 10, 1878, Michigan – October 11, 1963, New York). They claimed to have been married in 1901 in France. Anna was 23 and William was 62. They had two children:

- Louise Amelia Andrée Clark (August 13, 1902, Spain – August 6, 1919, Rangeley, Maine)
- Huguette Marcelle Clark (June 9, 1906, Paris, France – May 24, 2011, New York City)

In early 1946, Anna commissioned the Paganini Quartet, and acquired the four famous Stradivarius instruments once owned by Niccolo Paganini for their use.

=== Mary Joaquina Clark de Brabant ===
Clark's firstborn child was born in Helena, Montana in 1870. She married Dr. Everett Mallory Culver in 1891 in New York City, Charles Potter Kling in 1905 in New York City, and Marius de Brabant in 1925 in Los Angeles. Her first marriage produced her only child who survived to adulthood, Katherine Calder Culver. Mary had a mansion estate called "Plaisance" next to William Kissam Vanderbilt II's at Centerport Long Island, a New York City townhouse on 51st Street, and other estates throughout the country. She loved theatrics and music, and was the life of many parties, debutantes, and soirees that she hosted or attended as a prime socialite. Mary was philanthropically minded and among many hundreds of causes, she provided major gifts and endowments to many churches (including St. Thomas in New York City, St. John's Episcopal in Butte, and St. Thomas Episcopal in Clarkdale, Arizona), musical gifts to Carnegie Hall, the Emerald-Hodgson Hospital in Tennessee, the New York Diet Kitchen Association, the American Society for the Prevention of Cruelty to Animals, Berry College in Georgia, and the Women's Committee for the Repeal of the 18th Amendment. She died in 1939.

=== Charles W. Clark ===
Clark's firstborn son was born in Deer Lodge, Montana in 1871. He graduated from Yale University in 1893. He married Katherine Quinn Roberts in 1896, Celia Tobin (heiress of Tobin banking concerns) in 1904, and Elizabeth Wymond Judge in 1925. He had four children in his marriage with Celia Tobin, three daughters and a son. He was known mostly as "Charlie" and served in many substantial capacities for his father's business, political, and personal affairs in Arizona, California, and Montana. Like his younger brother though to a lesser extent, he collected rare books and manuscripts. He was quite prone to both heavy drinking and gambling. Like all his siblings, Charlie held many estates, including what would become known as the Clark Chateau in Butte; Charlie's "El Palomar" estate in California, with polo fields and race tracks; an Italianate mansion on Pebble Beach; New York City apartments; and other substantial properties.

=== Katherine Louise Clark Morris ===
Clark's second daughter was born in Helena in 1875. She married Dr. Lewis Rutherfurd Morris in 1900. He was the great-great-grandson of Lewis Morris. They had one child, Katherine Elizabeth Morris, who would marry John Hudson Hall. Catherine and Dr. Morris had a large apartment in New York City, the extensive Morris Manor Farm estate in upstate New York, and a South Carolina Plantation among other property holdings throughout the country. Much like her half-sister Huguette, she tended toward being reclusive particularly after her husband died in 1936. Catherine died at the age of 99, in 1974.

=== William Andrews Clark Jr. ===
Junior was born in Deer Lodge in 1877. He studied at University of Virginia and earned a degree in law. He was closely associated with Clark's major business interests in Butte and Arizona. In addition to being a primary funder for the Hollywood Bowl, Junior was founder of the Los Angeles Philharmonic in 1919 and its largest donor for many years. He left his library of rare books and manuscripts to the regents of the University of California, Los Angeles. Today, the William Andrews Clark Memorial Library specializes in English literature and history from 1641 to 1800, materials related to Oscar Wilde and his associates, and fine printing. Clark also provided buildings to the University of Virginia Law School Clark Hall (University of Virginia) and University of Nevada Reno. He had mansions and stables in Butte, Montana, a large cabin retreat property on Salmon Lake in Montana, and his largest mansion and mausoleum in Los Angeles. His Los Angeles property spanned more than a city block and included the exquisite library building, a large observatory building, elaborate guest housing, and manicured lawns and gardens.

=== Huguette Clark ===
Huguette (pronounced oo-GETT), born in Paris, France, in June 1906, was the youngest child of Clark with his second wife, Anna Eugenia LaChapelle. She married once, but divorced less than a year later. She led a reclusive life thereafter, seldom communicating with the public nor with her extended family. For many years, she lived in three combined apartments, with a total of 42 rooms, on New York's Fifth Avenue at 72nd Street, overlooking Central Park. In 1991, she moved out and for the remainder of her life lived in various New York City hospitals.

In February 2010, she became the subject of a series of reports on NBC News after it was reported that the caretakers of her three residences (including a $24 million estate in Connecticut, a sprawling seaside estate in Santa Barbara, California and her Fifth Avenue apartments valued at $100 million) had not seen her in decades. These articles were the basis for the 2013 bestselling book Empty Mansions: The Mysterious Life of Huguette Clark and the Spending of a Great American Fortune. by investigative reporter Bill Dedman and Paul Clark Newell, Jr.

Her final residence was a relatively small hospital room at Beth Israel Medical Center, where she died on the morning of May 24, 2011, age 104. Huguette's extraordinary collection of arts and antiquities were consigned to go on the auction block at Christie's in June 2014, over three years after her death.

=== J. Ross Clark ===
The youngest brother of Clark, James Ross Clark was an instrumental figure in Clark's empire, particularly in California and Las Vegas but also in Butte and Arizona. J. Ross married Miriam Augusta Evans, who was the younger sister of Clark's rival Marcus Daly's wife. J. Ross had a minor mansion in Butte and a mansion on West Adams in Los Angeles. He was President of the Los Angeles Chamber of Commerce and held many smaller governmental posts.

=== Joseph Kithcart Clark ===
Joseph was Clark's nearest brother in age and was born in 1842. He helped Clark with stores and mail operations, as well as various mining operations. He was elected to the first legislative session of the State of Montana and served honorably. Joseph had a mansion in Portland.

=== Walter Clark ===
Clark's nephew, Walter Miller Clark, son of James Ross and Miriam Augusta (Evans) Clark, along with Walter's wife, Virginia (McDowell) Clark, were passengers on the RMS Titanic. They were on their honeymoon. He was among the 1,514 who died on April 15, 1912, after the ship struck an iceberg at 2:20 a.m. Walter's wife, Virginia, was rescued by the RMS Carpathia, and arrived in New York City a widow.

Some of Clark's personal items were retrieved in the debris field during an expedition to the site of the sinking in 1994. They were identified by engraved initials. They included shaving soap, toiletry items, cuff links, and gambling chips.

== Legacy ==
Clark served twice as president of the Montana Constitutional Convention, presiding over efforts to turn the territory toward statehood. He was an active member of Montana's Society of Pioneers and contributed to their annual meetings and activities. Clark's extensive art collection was donated to the Corcoran Gallery in Washington, D.C., after his death. The Clark donation also included the construction of a new wing for the Corcoran, now known as the Clark Wing. He left the Columbia Gardens to Butte, and the Paul Clark home to the orphaned children of Butte with an endowment for its long-term operations. Clark helped fund and start the Collegiate Institute of Montana in Deer Lodge. He also left a bank building in Deer Lodge and contributed heavily to the Masonic Lodge buildings in both Deer Lodge and Butte.

In his mother's name, Clark gave the Mary Andrews Clark home in Los Angeles for working women, and funded an endowment for its ongoing upkeep. Monlaco Road in Los Angeles is named after the Montana Land Company that Clark and his brother J. Ross formed, which was associated with extensive farming and refining of sugar beets in the region. He provided initial and ongoing endowment funds for a kindergarten in New York City in honor of his first wife.

Clark further donated 135 acres to the Girl Scouts in honor of his elder daughter (by his second wife), Louise Amelia Andrée (who died at age 16 of meningitis). The Girl Scout camp in Briarcliff Manor was named Camp Andree Clark.

=== Clark County, Nevada ===
The township of Las Vegas was established as a maintenance stop for Clark's San Pedro, Los Angeles and Salt Lake Railroad. He subdivided 110 acres (45 ha) into 1200 lots, some of which on the corner of Fremont Street in Las Vegas sold for as much as $1750. The Las Vegas area was organized as Clark County, Nevada, in Clark's honor. His involvement in the founding of Las Vegas is recounted in a decidedly negative light by Chris Romano in the "Las Vegas" episode of Comedy Central's Drunk History, with Rich Fulcher portraying Clark.

=== Clarkdale, Arizona ===
Clarkdale, Arizona, named for Clark, was the site of smelting operations for Clark's mines in nearby Jerome, Arizona. The town includes the historic Clark Mansion, which sustained severe fire damage on June 25, 2010. Clarkdale is home to the Verde Canyon Railroad wilderness train ride, which follows the historic route that Clark had constructed in 1911 and home to the Copper Art Museum. Nearby, Jerome had a hospital and many other buildings built by Clark.

Clark's namesake son also provided the William Andrews Clark Library complex to UCLA in his father's name.

=== Mansions ===
Between 1884 and 1888, Clark constructed his first mansion, a 34-room, Tiffany-decorated home on West Granite Street, incorporating the most modern inventions available, in Butte, Montana. This home is now the Copper King Mansion bed-and-breakfast, as well as a museum. In 1899, Clark vastly improved upon Columbia Gardens for the children of Butte. It included flower gardens and greenhouses, a dance pavilion, an amusement park, a zoo, a lake, and picnic areas. An evening scene between characters Arline Simms (played by Anne Francis) and Buz Murdock (played by George Maharis) from the Route 66 television series 1961 episode "A Month of Sundays" was shot on location at Columbia Gardens where she emotionally falls into his arms on the grand staircase.

In 1899, Clark bought the famous Stewart's Castle in Washington, D.C., intending to build a larger mansion on the land. He razed the building while living next door at 1915 Massachusetts Avenue NW while he was a U.S. Senator. He never completed his planned D.C. mansion, and sold the property in 1921.

Like many Clark family members, Senior Clark also had his own custom built private railcar, completed toward the end of 1905. Dubbed "the Palace on Wheels" the special Pullman car was 82 feet long with frescoed ceilings, plush carpeted floors, and built of steel to be "wreck proof". It contained a kitchen, pantry, formal dining room that could seat twelve, 1500-year-old carved wood, his (in vermillion) and hers (in oak) sleeping apartments, tiled bathing room, an office, servant's sleeping quarters, a trunk room and closets, and an observation compartment. It was electrified, had its own speedometer so Clark could calculate time of arrival himself, and had a Pintsch gas system. W.A.C. was emblazoned on the sides.

To keep up with his contemporaries—the Rockefellers, Vanderbilts, Astors, Fricks, and Carnegies—Clark built a larger 121-room mansion on Fifth Avenue in New York City, the William A. Clark House. His plans grew in scope significantly from the time he purchased the land in 1895 until its ultimate completion in 1911. To provide for the materials needed for the structure, Clark bought an entire stone quarry in Maine and a bronze factory in New York among other company acquisitions. The mega-mansion was positioned across from Central Park and featured a tower rising 163 feet above the street, fifth floor ballrooms, five art gallery rooms full of mostly European paintings with most of these rooms multi-storied with skylights and one of them a full 95 feet long, several library rooms, Victorian Turkish baths and spa rooms, a wine cellar, interior driveway with garage and carport, 26 guest suites and rooms, 31 white marble bathrooms (many with ceilings of Faience marble), a free-standing circular Maryland marble staircase with extensive bronze and gold plate railing and ornamentation, two-story stone caryatids, a 36-foot marble rotunda with a dome of colored mosaics leading into 30-foot conservatory room which showcasing enormous glass panels ensconced in two-story bronze supports, a Tennessee marble fountain with carved marble mermaids, a theater stage with hydraulic lifts, an elevator that could fit 20 people, a main dining room with a 15-foot Numidian marble fireplace held up by life-sized carved figures of Diana and Neptune and quarter-sawn oaks imported directly from the Sherwood Forest, the world's largest private organ, and multiple quarantine rooms in case of a pandemic. A fireplace from a 16th Century Normandy castle, stained-glass panels from a French 13th Century Cathedral, and the Salon Dore an 18th Century French period room were brought form Europe and placed in the home among dozens of other imported pieces. Clark packed so much art into the home that when it the art was donated to the Corcoran Museum (after the Metropolitan Museum of Art declined the bequest) through his will, the family had to create an entire museum multi-story wing just to display portions of the collection. Seven tons of coal was brought in daily to keep the mansion operations going, brought in on Clark's own private rail line to the home.

In Santa Barbara in 1923, Clark bought the William Miller Graham mansion on a 23-acre estate with stunning views and beachfront on the Pacific Ocean. This mansion was razed and his widow Anna built her own mansion on the property in the early 1930s, now the home of Bellosguardo Foundation.

The Montana Hotel in Jerome, Arizona was built by Clark's United Verde Copper Company and housed suites for him and his family. In current times, there are many dozens of mansions and buildings associated with Clark and his family in most U.S. states, including Arizona, California Bellosguardo Foundation Mary Andrews Clark Memorial Home, Connecticut, Florida, Maine, Massachusetts, Montana, New Jersey, New York William A. Clark House, Oregon and South Carolina, and Paris, France.

== See also ==
- Andree Clark Bird Refuge, Santa Barbara, California
- Atlantic Cable Quartz Lode
- List of historic properties in Clarkdale, Arizona
- Mary Andrews Clark Memorial Home – a landmark Los Angeles home for women built by Clark as a memorial for his mother

== Sources ==
- Dedman, Bill; Newell, Paul Clark Jr. (2013), Empty Mansions: The Mysterious Life of Huguette Clark and the Spending of a Great American Fortune, New York: Ballantine Books, ISBN 978-0-345-53452-1
- NBCNews.com: Huguette Clark, the reclusive heiress, and the men managing her money, an NBCNews.com special report
- United States Congress. "William A. Clark (id: C000454)". Biographical Directory of the United States Congress.
- Hopkins, A.D.; Evans, K.J. (2000), The First 100, Las Vegas: Huntington Press, ISBN 0-929712-67-6
- Mangam, William (1941), The Clarks An American Phenomenon, New York, NY: Silver Bow Press, OCLC 390214

U.S. Senate
Preceded by Norris Cotton	U.S. Senator (Class 1) from Montana; 1899–1900; Served alongside: Thomas H. Carter	Succeeded by Paris Gibson
Preceded by Thomas H. Carter	U.S. Senator (Class 2) from Montana; 1901–1907; Served alongside: Paris Gibson, Thomas H. Carter	Succeeded by Joseph M. Dixon
