= Helen Silving-Ryu =

First female law professor in the United States

- Born: 8 March 1906
- Died: 1993
- Education: University Vienna, (Ph.D, JD); Columbia University
- Occupations: Legal Scholar and Professor of Law
- Spouse: Paul K. Ryu

Helen Silving-Ryu (8 March 1906, Kraków, Poland-1993) was the first female law professor in the United States

Silving-Ryu was the only female scholar mentored by Austrian philosopher and jurist, Hans Kelsen. Silving-Ryu and Kelsen collaborated extensively during her time at Harvard University.

== Personal life ==
Helen was born on March 8, 1906, in Kraków. Daughter of Szaje Chaim and Sara vel Salomea (Bauminger) Silberpfennig. Came to the United States, 1939.

On January 3, 1959, Silving married Paul K. Ryu at the home of New York University’s chancellor, George D. Stoddard.

Silving met Ryu during her time at Harvard University. They intellectually collaborated over the course of their life together on publicational works on the topics of law, freedom, and justice.

== Major publications ==
- Silving, Helen (1948). Immigration Laws of the United States. Oceana Publications.
- Silving, Helen (1967). Constituent elements of crime. Thomas.
- Silving, Helen (1968-01-01). Sources of law. W. S. Hein. ISBN 9780930342227.
- Silving, Helen (1956). Nationality in Comparative Law.
- Silving, Helen (1961). In Re Eichmann: A Dilemma of Law and Morality. American Society of International Law.
- Ryu, Helen Silving (1955). The Twilight Zone of Positive and Natural Law.
- Silving, Helen (1999). The Lasting Value of Kelsenism. University of Tennessee.
- Ryu, Paul K.; Silving, Helen (1964). Nullum Crimen Sine Actu.
- Silving, Helen (1967). Essays on mental incapacity and criminal conduct. Thomas.
- Silving, Helen (1971). Criminal justice. W. S. Hein. ISBN 9780930342197.

== Literature ==
- Miriam Gassner, Austrian Jurists in US-exile – Jurisprudence as a Door Opener to US Law Schools, in: Journal of Austrian American History 10/1-2 (2026) p. 193-214
- Miriam Gassner (ed.): Helsen Silving-Ryu - Der Aufstieg einer jüdischen Migrantin aus Wien zur First Lady of US-Criminal Law. Wien: Manz 2026, 224 pages.
