= William Andrews Clark Memorial Library =

UCLA-associated library of rare books and manuscripts

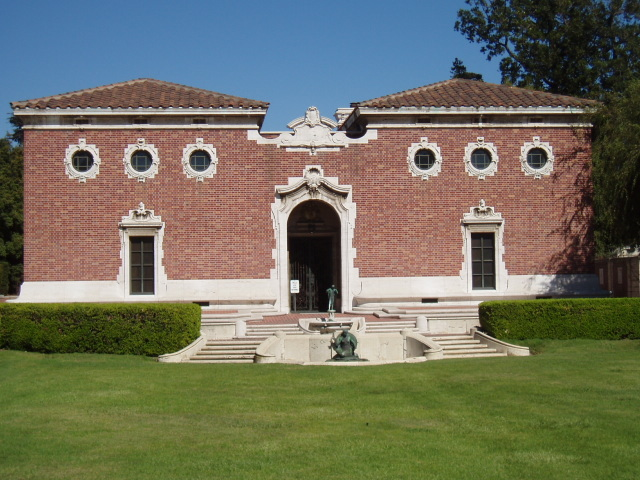
- 34.03303°N 118.31426°W
- Location: 2520 Cimarron St, Los Angeles, California 90018
- Established: 1924
- Branches: N/A

Collection
- Size: 110,000 (rare books); 22,000 (rare manuscripts) (2007)

Access and use
- Circulation: Library does not circulate

Other information
- Budget: US$30 million (total endowment)
- Director: Helen Deutsch
- Employees: 6 (FTE)
- Website: clarklibrary.ucla.edu

Los Angeles Historic-Cultural Monument
- Designated: October 9, 1964
- Reference no.: 28

The William Andrews Clark Memorial Library (Clark Library), is a library affiliated with the University of California, Los Angeles. It holds books and manuscripts with particularly many regarding English literature and history from the 17th-19th century, Oscar Wilde and the fin de siècle, and fine press printing. It is located about 10 mi (16 km) southeast from UCLA, in the West Adams district of Los Angeles, and 2 mi (3.2 km) west of the University of Southern California. It is administered by UCLA's Center for Seventeenth- and Eighteenth-Century Studies, which offers several long- and short-term fellowships for graduate and postdoctoral scholars to use the Library's collections. However, any reader with an interest in the collection is able to study.

== History ==
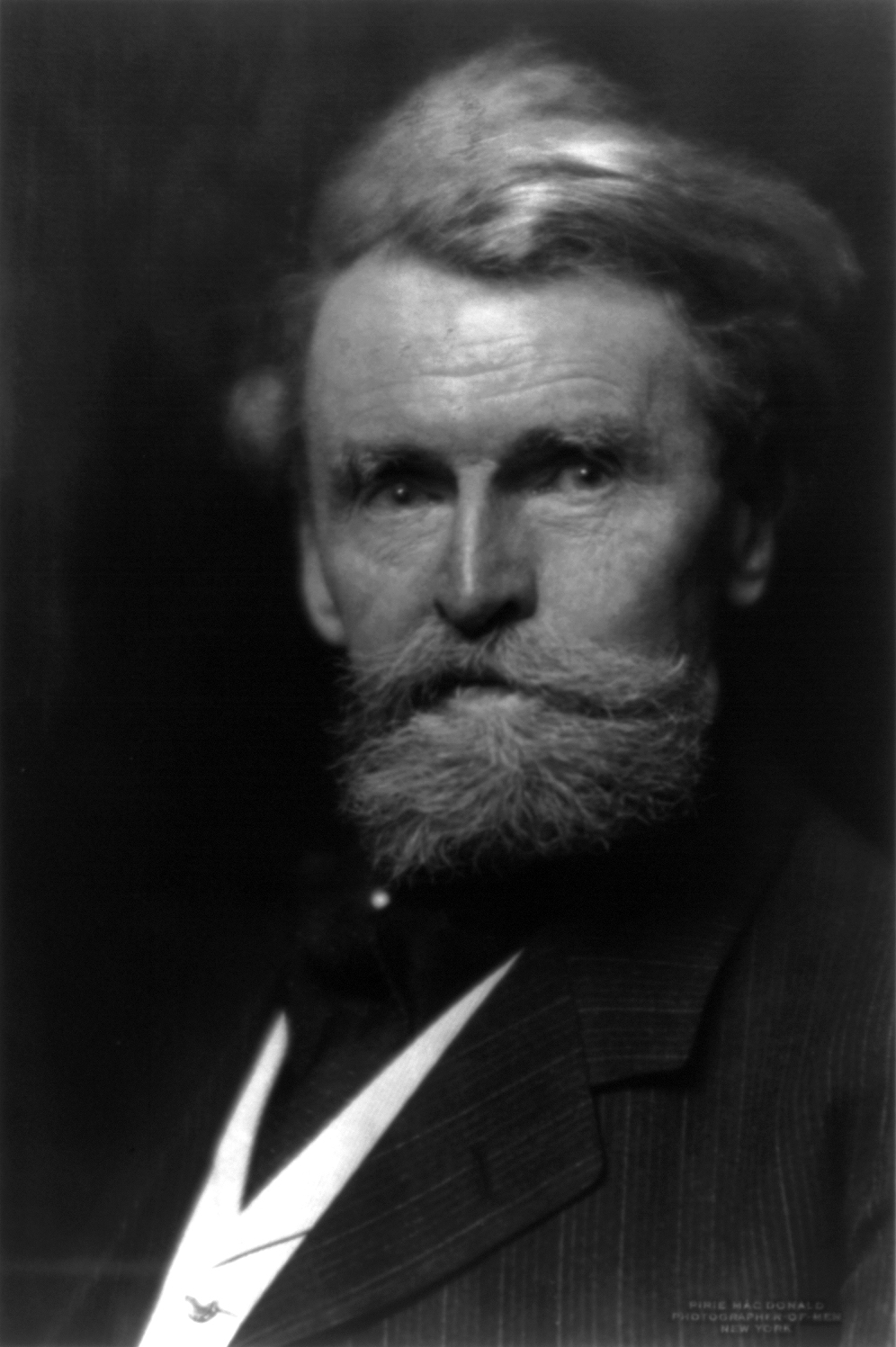
William Andrews Clark, Sr. (1839–1925)

Located in the West Adams district, the library and its collections were built by William Andrews Clark Jr., and named after his father, U.S. Senator William Andrews Clark Sr. who gained his fortune by copper mining. The library was designed by architect Robert D. Farquhar. The land on which the library stands was previously the house of Clark Jr.. The house was demolished in the 1870s and the library was constructed from 1924 to 1926 on the same property.

Clark Jr. was a book collector and a philanthropist. After the library's construction Clark Jr. announced his intent to donate the collection (then around 13,000 books), the buildings and the square-block property to the Southern Branch of the University of California. An endowment of $1.5 million was also transferred to the Southern Branch of the University of California upon his death in 1934. It is still one of the most generous donations in the university's history.

In 1985, the Clark Library's administration was transferred to the center for 17th and 18th Century Studies. This Organized Research Unit, within UCLA's College of Humanities organizes academic and cultural programs related to early modern materials at the library, which is also used as a venue for conferences, lectures, and concerts developed by the center.

== Collections ==
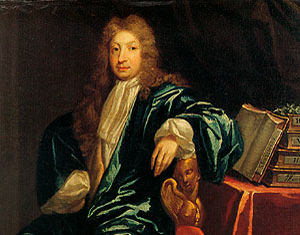
John Dryden (1631–1700)

The early 20th century ushered in a heyday of American book collecting. William Andrews Clark Jr., along with other wealthy bibliophiles such as J. Paul Getty, Henry E. Huntington and Henry Clay Folger, first began forming his library during this period.

Initially, Clark collected a broad array of English imprints. His library included the four Shakespeare folios; important editions of Chaucer, Ben Jonson, Byron, Dickens, and Robert Louis Stevenson; works illustrated by George Cruikshank and William Blake; French literature from Pierre de Ronsard to Émile Zola; autograph letters and manuscripts by authors, statesmen, and musicians; and materials relating to the exploration of the American West. In time, Clark began to concentrate his collecting on English literature of the 17th and 18th centuries, particularly in the Restoration, which defines the strengths of the Clark Library today. Eventually, Clark also developed a large collection of Oscar Wilde books and manuscripts.

Clark also took an interest in fine printing within the Arts and Crafts tradition, which is represented by complete runs of the books printed by the Kelmscott Press and Doves Press, the two greatest influences on the revival of printing in England at the turn of the 20th century. The library also has a substantial collection of American fine presses in the Arts and Crafts Movement, particularly Californian printers, as well as the library and papers of printer and sculptor Eric Gill and Los Angeles artist Paul Landacre. The library continues to collect in this field.

In 2009, nuclear physicist Paul Chrzanowski donated a collection of seventy-two Shakespeare books, published between 1479 and 1731, to the Clark Library.

As of 2006, the collection contains over 110,000 rare books and 22,000 manuscripts, in addition to an extensive reference collection of modern books, periodicals and microfilm.

=== 17th and 18th centuries ===
The Clark Library is one of the most extensive for British literature and history from the English Civil War through the reign of George II (1641–1761). Many of its collections are only rivaled by the British Library, especially its literary collections, which include literary giants John Dryden, John Milton, Daniel Defoe, Jonathan Swift, Alexander Pope, Henry Fielding, and Aphra Behn. The Clark Library also has substantial collections of music books and songs, scores, and musicology printed before 1750; ballad and comic operas; the edited works of Purcell, Handel, and their contemporaries in England; and a choice collection of manuscript anthems, hymns, and incidental music assembled by Theodore Finney.

Among its most valuable collections are the scientific works of Isaac Newton, Robert Boyle, Edmond Halley, John Evelyn, and Sir Kenelm Digby. The Library also holds theological and philosophical collections of Thomas Cartwright, Protestant theology, Thomas Hobbes, John Locke, and David Hume.

=== Oscar Wilde Collection ===
Oscar Wilde

Perhaps the Library's most valuable and extensive collection is the work by and relating to Oscar Wilde. It is considered the most comprehensive collection of its kind in the world. Clark originally purchased Wilde manuscripts from Wilde's son, Vyvyan Holland, among others. Today, the collection includes photographs, original portraits, caricatures, playbills, and news cuttings. Most of the important Wilde studies in recent years have drawn heavily upon the Clark's resources. The Clark has also taken to collecting books and manuscripts of Wilde's literary circle and the decadent and modernist movements of the 1890s, including the most important editions of William Butler Yeats and many others.

== Fellowships ==
Clark Library logo

Several types of fellowships are offered for graduate and postdoctoral scholars to study at the Clark Library. Among the most prestigious are the Ahmanson-Getty Fellowship, Clark Dissertation Fellowship, American Society for Eighteenth-Century Studies /Clark Fellowship, Kanner Fellowship in British Studies, Kenneth Karmiole Endowed Graduate Fellowship, and Clark Bibliographical Fellowship.

All fellowships are administered by UCLA's Center for Seventeenth- and Eighteenth-Century Studies. Each fellowship varies in stipend, duration, and qualification. All of the fellowships require that the recipient make use of the Clark Library's collections.

== Architecture ==
The library is set on a walled block in the West Adams neighborhood near Downtown. A grandly conceived garden pavilion, the two-story building is lavishly detailed inside and out. Designed by Robert D. Farquhar, one of California's most eminent romantic architects, its paired cubic reading rooms resemble the Villa Lante, a dual Italian Renaissance composition attributed to Vignola. In keeping with the collection, its brick and stone facades overlay an English baroque mode similar to that employed by Wren at Hampton Court. The brickwork is very fine, subtly dappled in five colors and set in lavender-tinted mortar.

The Library occupies the former yard of a large house built in the early 20th century. Unusual for its time, the property was surrounded by a brick wall. This feature may have been part of the property's appeal for Clark who, after buying it, bought and removed eleven neighboring houses, extended the wall around the entire block, and engaged landscape architect, Ralph D. Cornell to develop plans for a public park. That project was never completed. Willed to UCLA in 1934 with the stipulation that no structure ever rise within one hundred feet of the library, the building stood for the next sixty years in an unfinished landscape gradually emptied by the removal of the house and an observatory.

In 1988, the Los Angeles architectural firm of Barton Phelps & Associates (Barton Phelps, FAIA, 1946 - ) was commissioned to prepare a master plan for the site. In response to the restrictions of Clark's gift, it proposes a major research facility surrounding a below-grade garden at its center. Initial funding from the Getty and Ahmanson Trusts was conveyed to the library by former UCLA Chancellor, Dr. Franklin Murphy.

The first of phase construction accommodates library support facilities in a linear building conceived as a two-story, extendable wall. Its four modules are separated by courtyards to form what has been called a range, an 18th-century term borrowed from Jefferson's plan for the University of Virginia. The North Range stretches two hundred and seventy feet along the north side of the block. It houses editorial offices, conference and food service facilities, and guestrooms. It leaves the center of the site open and, in its form and color, it relates more closely to the red brick fence than to the library.

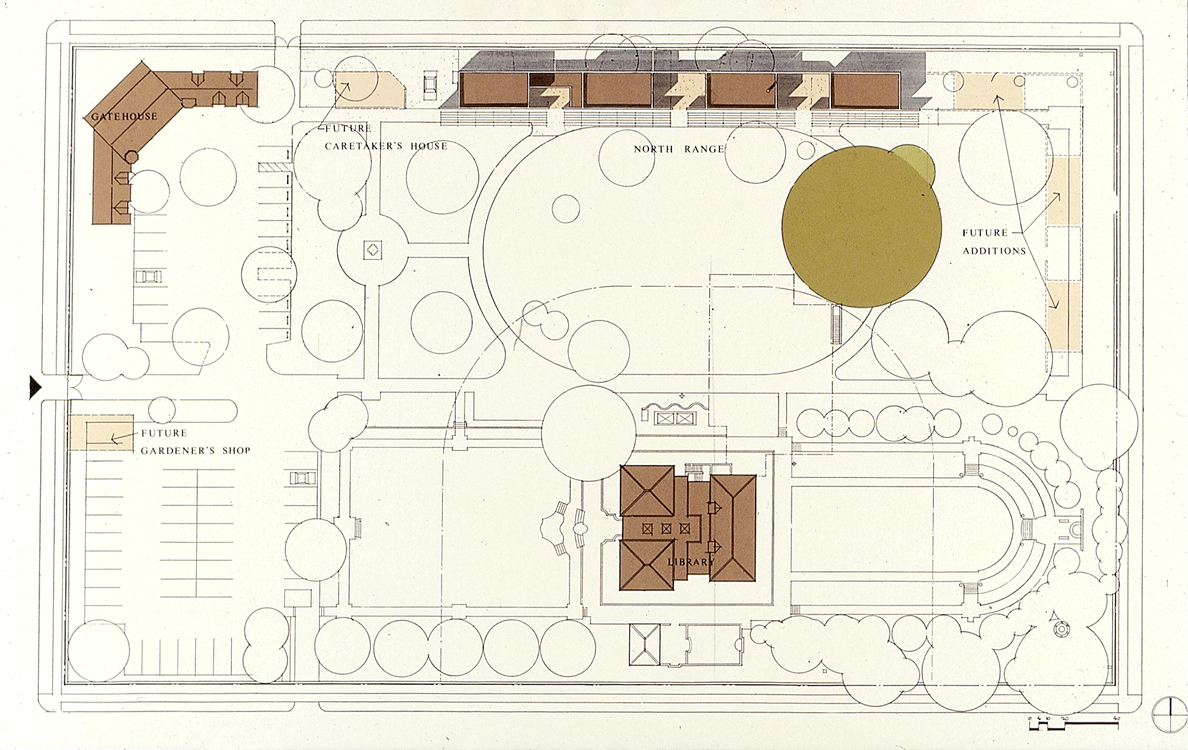
Site Plan

Vase

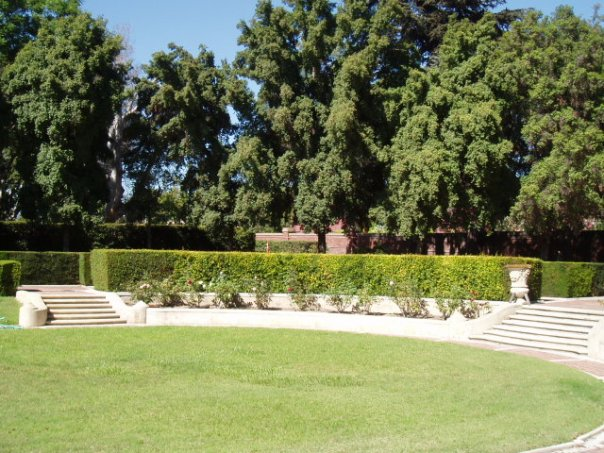
East lawn

North lawn

Sculpture

Ceiling of the drawing room

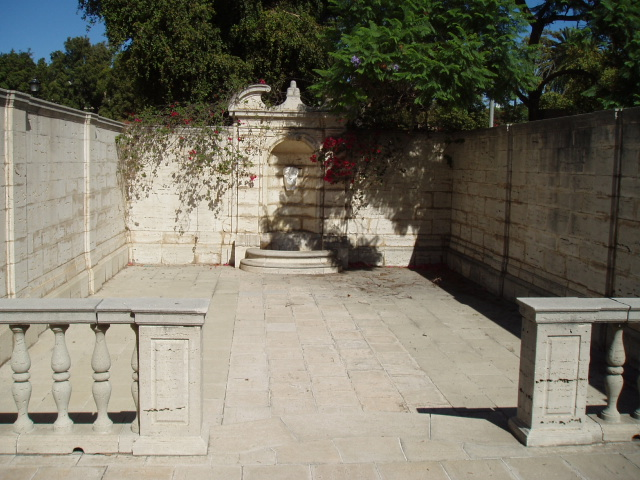
Outdoor reading room

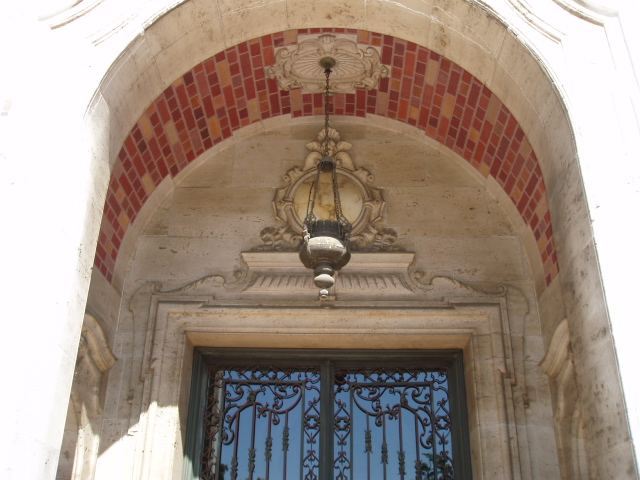
Front entrance

Ceiling of foyer featuring murals by Allyn Cox<ref>Architectural History. UCLA William Andrews Clark Memorial Library. Retrieved March 8, 2024.

Fountain statue

Rear facade

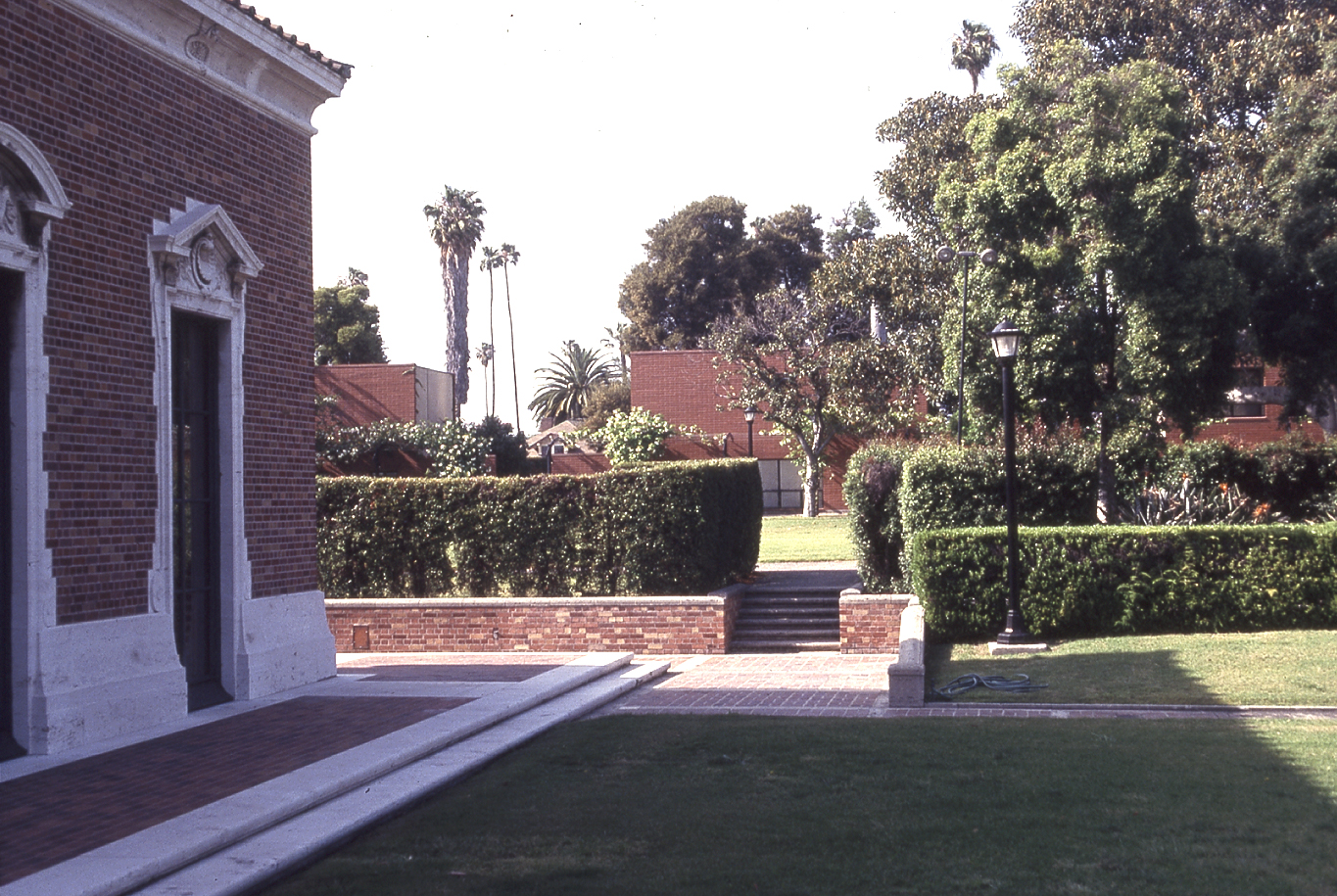
View Towards North Range

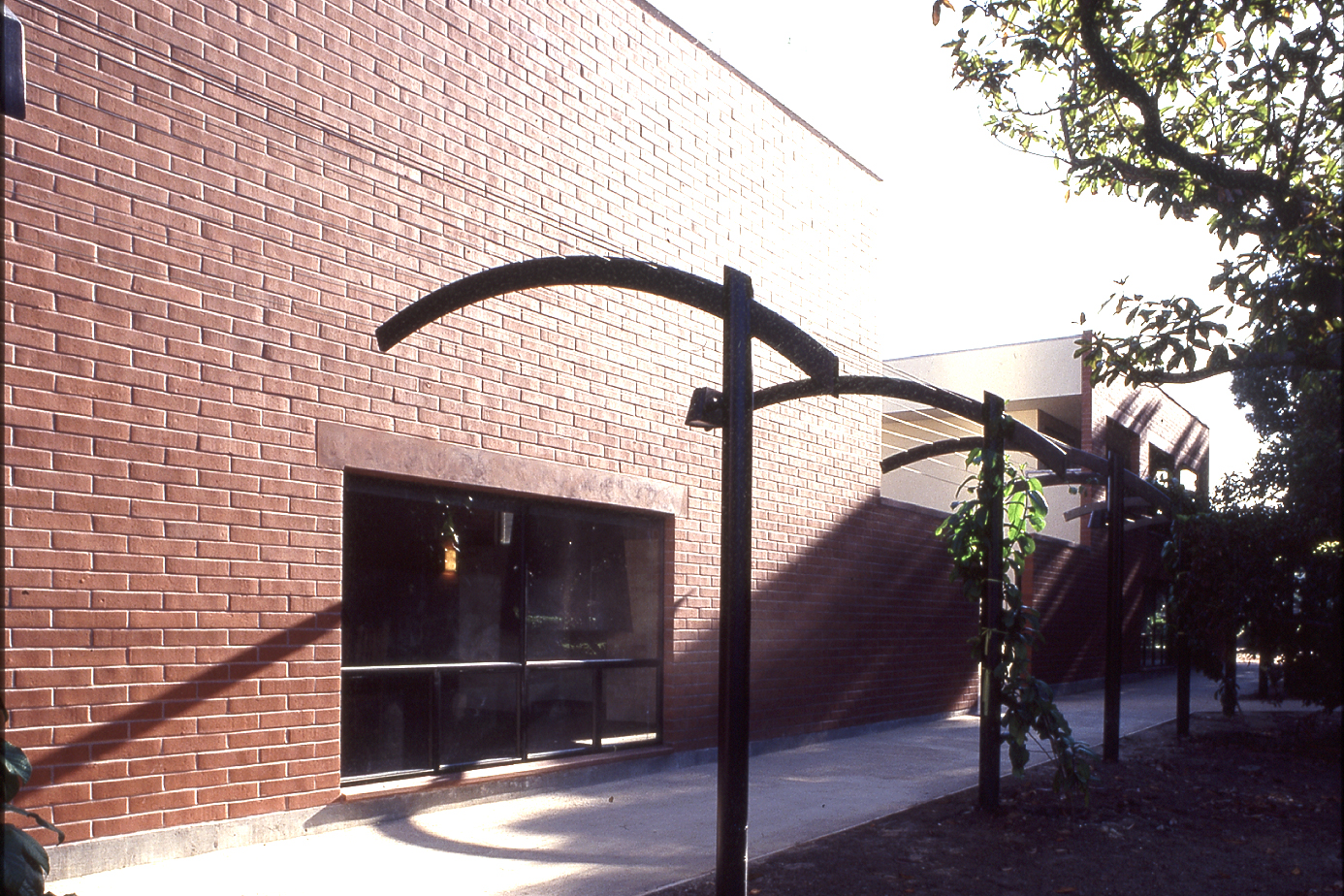
North Range, Trellis

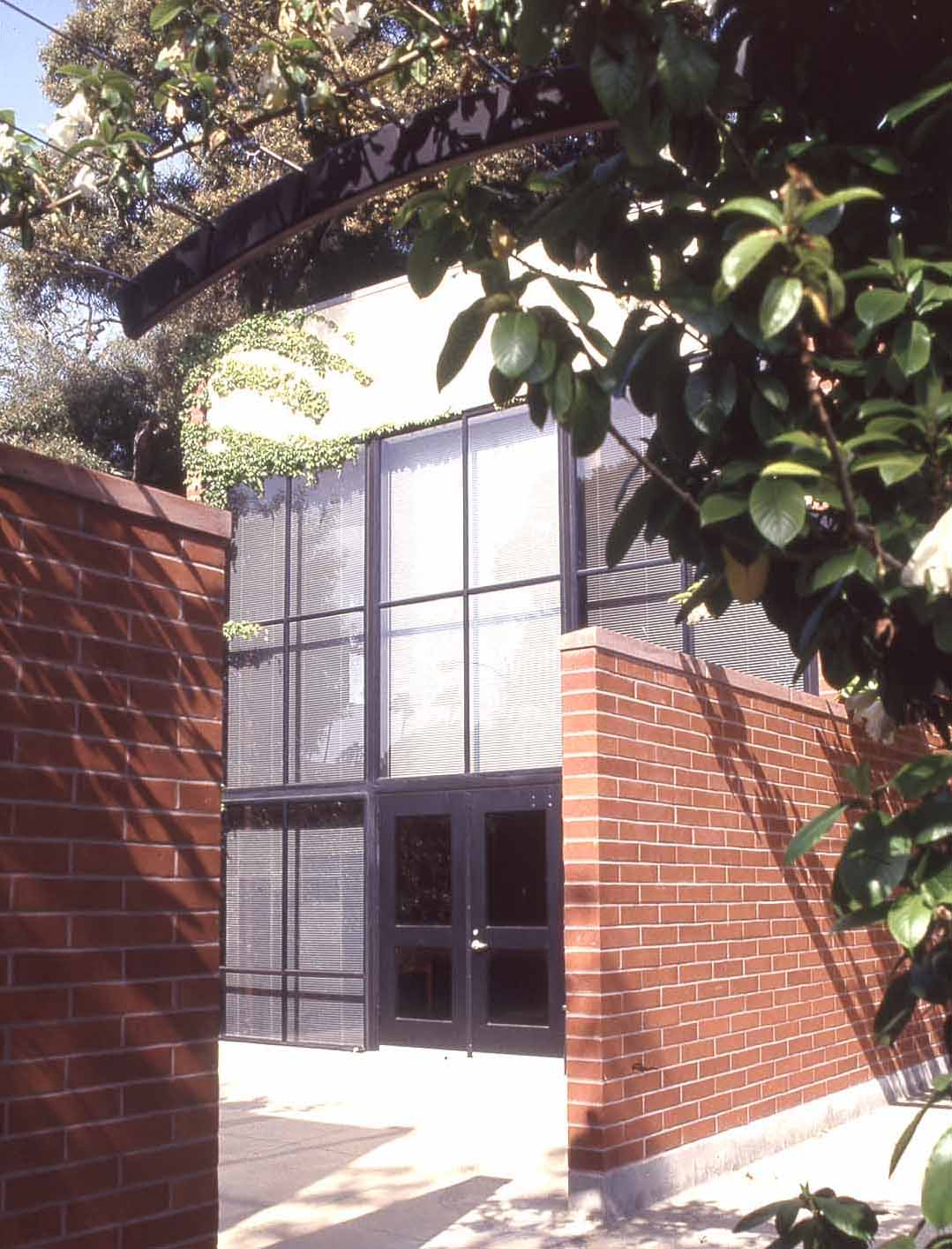
North Range, Courtyard

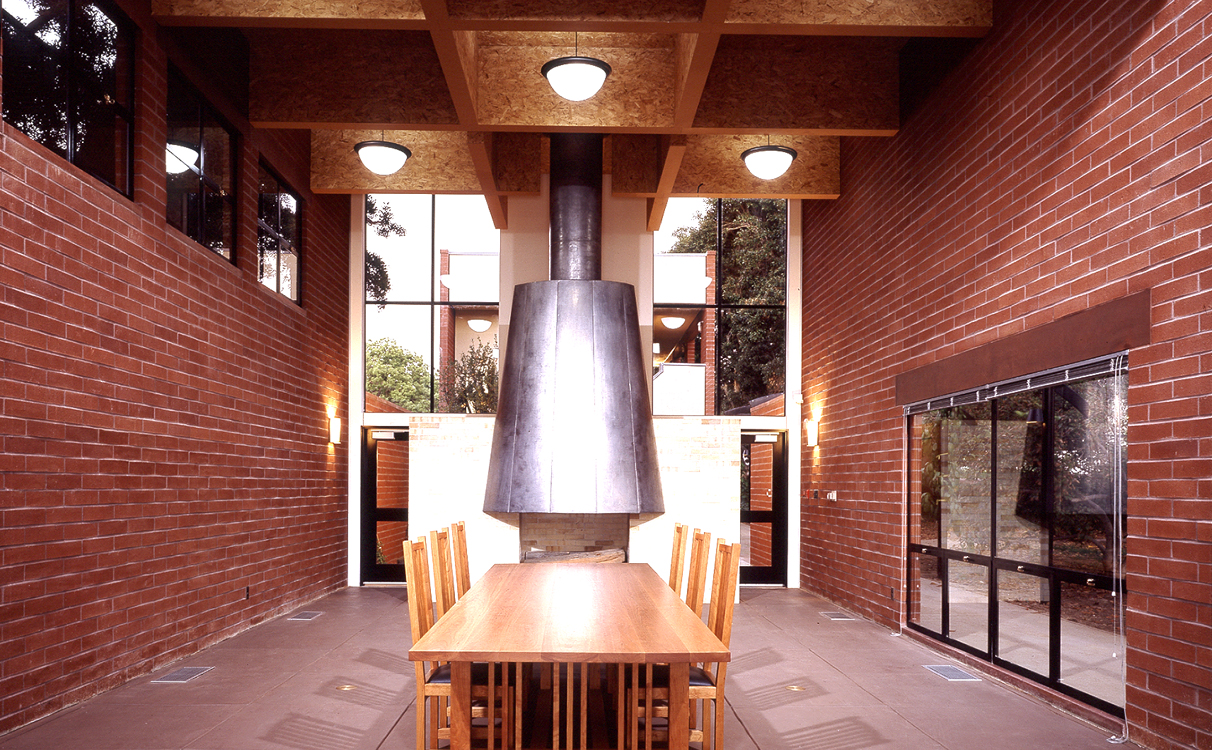
North Range, Commons

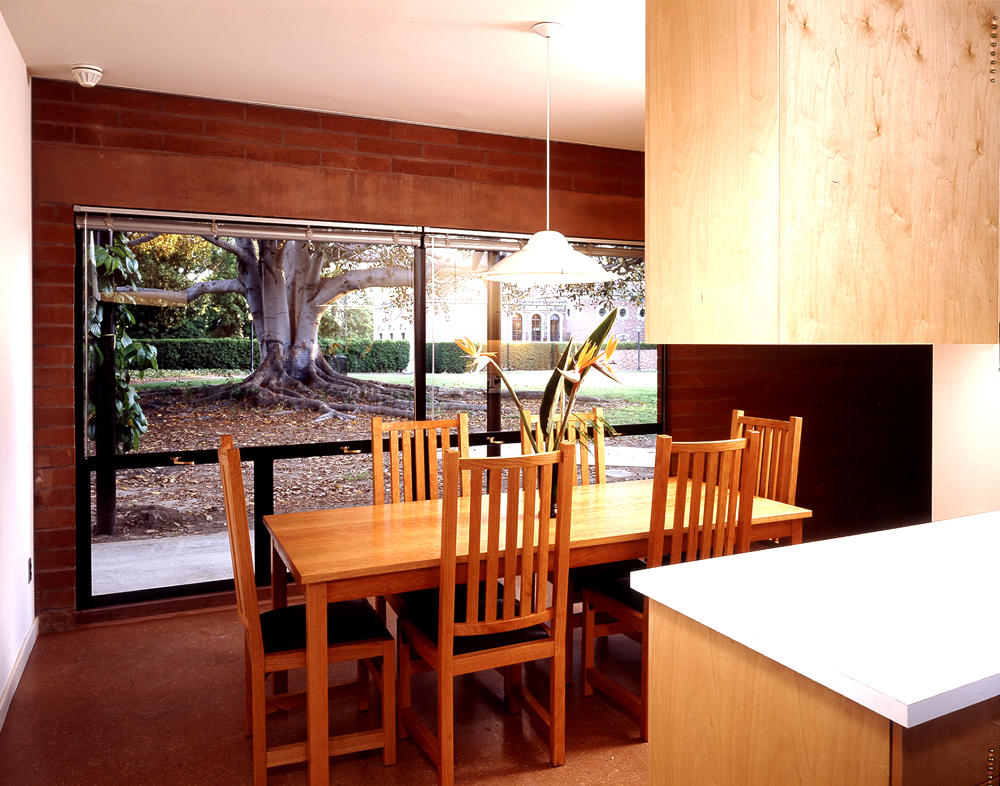
North Range, View Towards Library

== See also ==
- List of Los Angeles Historic-Cultural Monuments in South Los Angeles
- UCLA Library
- Mary Andrews Clark Memorial Home
- Huntington Library
