= Seoul Women's University =

University in South Korea

Coordinates: 37.628°N 127.090°E

- 서울여자대학교
- Former name: Seoul Women's College
- Type: Private
- Established: 1960; 66 years ago
- Religious affiliation: Christian
- President: Lee Yoon Sun (이윤선)
- Academic staff: 239
- Administrative staff: 246
- Students: 8,338
- Location: Seoul, South Korea
- Campus: Suburban
- Website: www.swu.ac.kr

Korean name
- Hangul: 서울여자대학교
- Hanja: 서울女子大學校
- RR: Seoul yeoja daehakgyo
- MR: Sŏul yŏja taehakkyo

Seoul Women's University (SWU; Korean: 서울여자대학교) is a private women's university in Nowon District, Seoul, South Korea. The university comprises five colleges and is a doctorate degree-granting institution.

== History ==
The school was founded in December 1960 by the Presbyterian Church of Korea. The original concept was born in the 1920s, but the Japanese governor at the time refused to grant permission. In the late 1950s, the Presbyterian Church of Korea secured US$150,000 by raising funds at an American conference. In its first few years, Seoul Women's University only had two main buildings. Dr. Hwang Kyung Koh served as the first president of the university.

== Campus today ==
The university now boasts 5 colleges, with 31 majors for undergraduate students, 25 departments for master's degree students, and 13 departments in 2 divisions for students pursuing doctoral degrees.

== International opportunities ==
Through various partnerships and exchange programs with universities in the United States, Canada, France, Germany, Great Britain, New Zealand, Vietnam, China, and Japan, Seoul Women's University offers many chances for people from many countries to interact. Korean students are offered short-term cross-cultural exchange programs, and international students are offered internships after finishing their studies. Korean students also have the chance to spend a year abroad in the United States, Canada, Australia, New Zealand, France, Great Britain, Germany, Vietnam, China, or Japan. Other opportunities include the SWELL English program, and the Bahrom International Program.

== SWELL English ==
The SWELL program stands for Seoul Women’s University English Language License. It is one of the unique programs at Seoul Women’s University. This program has two types: regular classes during semesters or an intensive program in the summer and winter vacations. The main goal of these two programs is exactly the same: improving English skills of all three areas: writing, speaking, and listening. However, the characteristics are different.

A regular class during the semester is only for Seoul Women's University students, whereas the intensive program is for anyone who is willing to study English intensively. In a regular SWELL class, students commute from their home. The class starts at 7:15 am. However, students can take regular SWELL courses between classes, so not just the early birds can participate in the program. All classes are small and taught by an English speaker, mostly American and Canadian professors. On the other hand, in the intensive SWELL program, students live in dormitory for six weeks. The most remarkable feature of this program is that participants should speak only English. Therefore, a lot of students of Seoul Women's’ University, as well as other well-known university students in Korea, join this program to advance their English skills.

The Intensive SWELL program is not only a demanding course, but has various enjoyable activities such as banquet day, sports days, a singing contest, and a field trip. In other words, Swellers (a term for participants in the intensive SWELL program) attain more active English from different activities rather than passively learning from only English textbooks. The two SWELL programs have different resident styles, run at different periods of time, and include different events. However, both programs are valuable in terms of enhancing English skills.

== Bahrom International Program ==
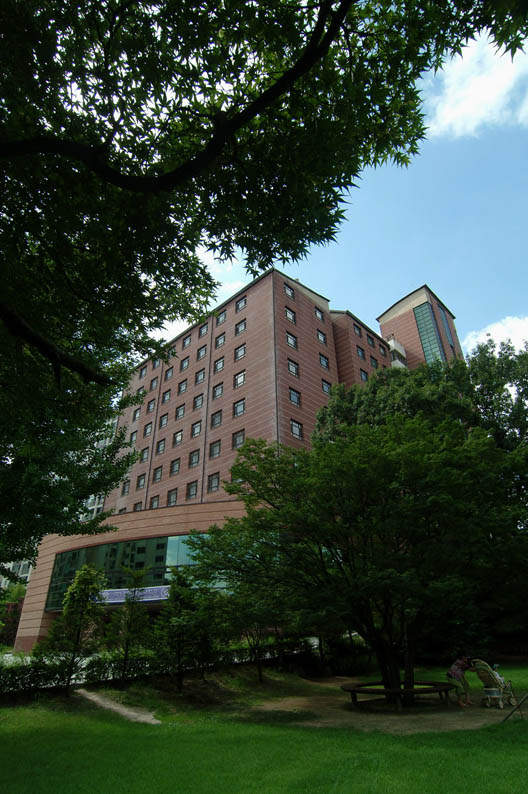
The Bahrom buildings

The Bahrom International Program strives to invite foreign students from the university's sister colleges in Canada and the United States to learn about and experience Korean culture. Exchange students of Seoul Women's University who are attending these sister colleges in the following semester participate in this program.

According to a division of International Relations in Seoul Women's University, participants will learn about Korean lifestyle, historical and religious background, the economic issues, politics, North/South tension, Korean pop culture and Korean language through lectures and hands-on experiences such as field trips and group activities. For four weeks of the program, participants live in the Bahrom Education building. In each room, two Korean students and one foreign student stay together. Fostering closer relationships between Korean students and foreign students enables foreign students to learn more about Korea. Korean students receive ongoing guidance from the foreign students who are from the sister colleges that they will be attending the next semester as exchange students.

== Notable alumni ==
- Han Ji-min, actress
- Kim Ji-ho, actress
- Lee Bo-young, actress
- Go Youn-jung, model and actress
- Min Hee-jin, art director and graphic designer
- Baek Ji-heon, singer (Fromis_9)

== See also ==
- Education in South Korea
