= Hollywood Studio Club =

- U.S. National Register of Historic Places
- Los Angeles Historic-Cultural Monument
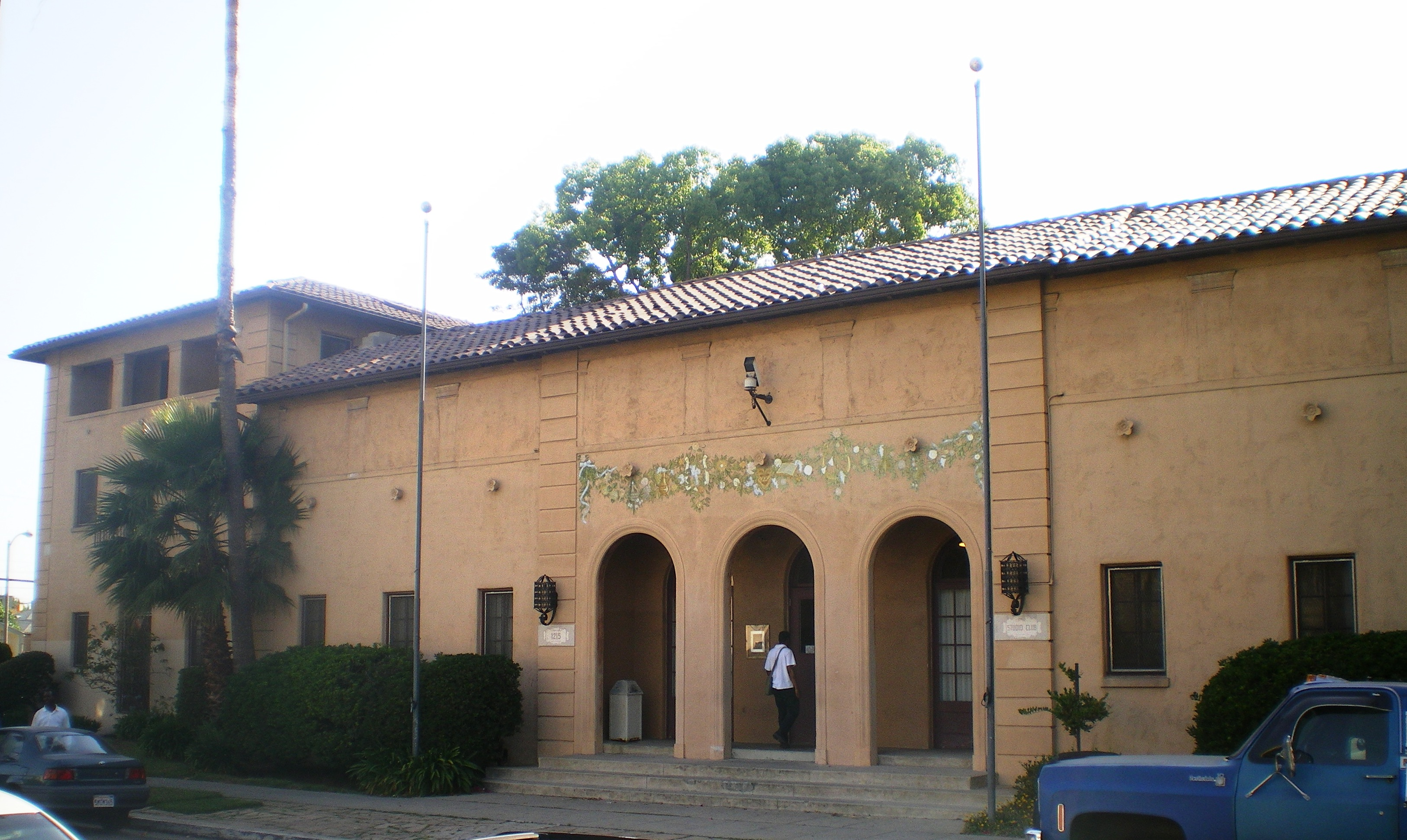
- Hollywood Studio Club, May 2008
- Location: 1215–1233 Lodi Place, Hollywood, Los Angeles, California
- Coordinates: 34°5′34″N 118°19′25″W
- Built: 1925
- Architect: Julia Morgan
- Architectural style: Italian Renaissance Revival
- NRHP reference No.: 80000806

Significant dates
- Added to NRHP: November 25, 1980
- Designated LAHCM: May 4, 1977

The Hollywood Studio Club was a chaperoned dormitory, sometimes referred to as a sorority, for young women involved in the motion picture business from 1916 to 1975. Located in the heart of Hollywood, Los Angeles, California, the Studio Club was run by the YWCA and housed some 10,000 women during its 59-year existence. It was the home at various times to many Hollywood celebrities, including Marilyn Monroe, Ayn Rand, Donna Reed, Kim Novak, Maureen O'Sullivan, Rita Moreno, Barbara Eden, and Sharon Tate. The building was designed in the Italian Renaissance Revival architectural style by noted California architect Julia Morgan, who also designed Hearst Castle. The Studio Club closed in 1975, and the building was used as a YWCA-run Job Corps dormitory until April 30, 2012. It was listed in the National Register of Historic Places in 1979 and remains the property of the YWCA Greater Los Angeles.

== Formation of the Studio Club ==
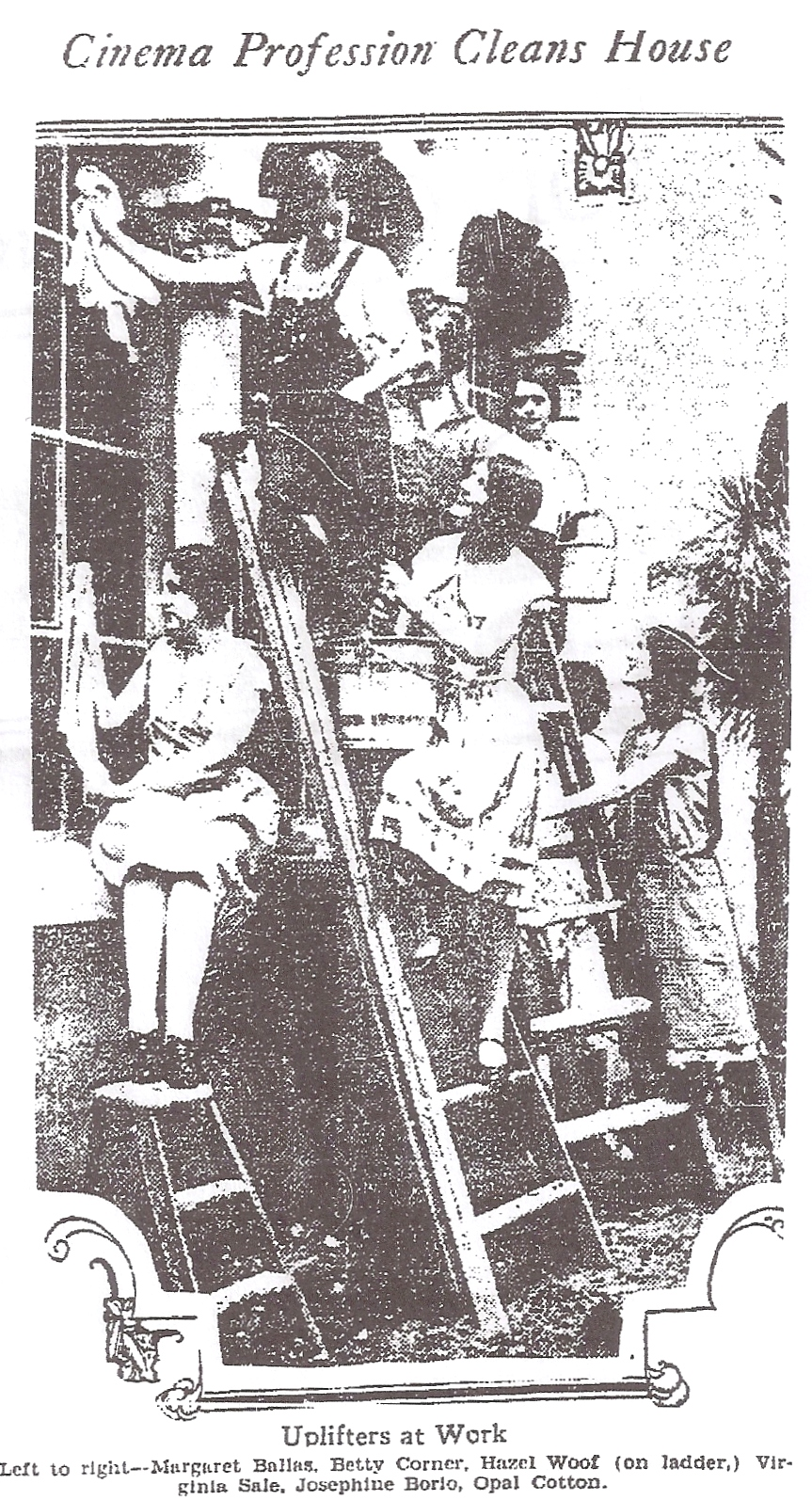
Photograph of Studio Club residents cleaning house, Los Angeles Times, 1927

The Hollywood Studio Club was formed in 1916. It began with a group of young women trying to break into the movies who gathered in the basement of the Hollywood Public Library to read plays. A librarian, Mrs. Eleanor Jones, worried about the young women living in cheap hotels and rooming houses with no place to study or practice their craft. Mrs. Jones solicited help from the local YWCA, and a hall was established as a meeting place. Hollywood studios and businessmen donated money to rent an old house on Carlos Avenue with space for 20 women. Mrs. Cecil B. DeMille and Mary Pickford were active in the club's operations, and Pickford later recalled, "Mrs. DeMille spent every day doing something for the club. And the motion picture industry supported us." A newspaper article in 1919 described the club this way:

The club is more of a sorority, with delightful picture 'atmosphere,' than anything else, and the same happy atmosphere will pervade the new home. A dominant note is the refining touch of home life and sense of protection, with assurance of assistance, not only in material way when need arises, but in one's work, as well. Financially, many desperate cases among young women have been tided over by the Hollywood Studio Club.

== The "Studio Girl" ==
In the early 1920s, Hollywood became embroiled in scandals, including the 1921 case involving Fatty Arbuckle and his role in the death of young actress, Virginia Rappe. The image of the "extra girl", the pretty young girl who had traveled across the country to make it in the movies only to find herself the victim of exploitation, became a public relations problem for Hollywood. One industry observer wondered if extra work would ever be anything other than "an alibi for prostitution." In order to change this negative reputation, the Hollywood studios, led by Will Hays, enacted reforms including the formation of the Central Casting Bureau in 1925 and the construction of a large new home for the Hollywood Studio Club in 1926. By opening a large "chaperoned, elite dormitory" for Hollywood's young women, the studios hoped to replace the image of sad, bedraggled and exploited "extra girl" with the image of the new "studio girl"—a smartly dressed, graceful, and genteel woman tutored in etiquette as well as the performing arts. Hays told The New York Times that he sought to "make the motion picture business ... a model industrial community, complete with recreation facilities, community centres, dormitories [and] matrons."

== Architecture and construction ==
Between 1923 and 1925, a widely publicized fundraising campaign was held to build the new Hollywood Studio Club. Contributions were received from Famous Players–Lasky ($10,000), Metro Goldwyn and Carl Laemmle ($5,000 each), Warner Bros. ($3,000), and Christie Comedies ($2,000). (Note: $25,000 (the sum of the aforementioned amounts) in 1923 equates to approximately $472,000 in 2025, according to calculations based on the consumer price index in the United States measure of inflation.) In March 1923, aviator and movie star Andree Peyre conducted an aerial acrobatic exhibition and airplane race over Hollywood to help raise funds for the new home. In February 1925, a final $5,000 donation from silent screen star Norma Talmadge allowed the group to begin construction. (Note: $5,000 in 1925 equates to approximately $92,000 in 2025, according to calculations based on the consumer price index in the United States measure of inflation.) The organization hired architect Julia Morgan to design the new building, and a ground-breaking ceremony took place in June 1925 with Mary Pickford and Morgan in attendance.

The new Hollywood Studio Club opened in May 1926, having been built at a cost of $250,000. (Note: $250,000 in 1926 equates to approximately $4,547,000 in 2025, according to calculations based on the consumer price index in the United States measure of inflation.) The building was opened at a ceremony attended by 2,500 people, "including many of the celebrities of the motion picture world," with dedication ceremonies in the afternoon and "dancing at midnight."

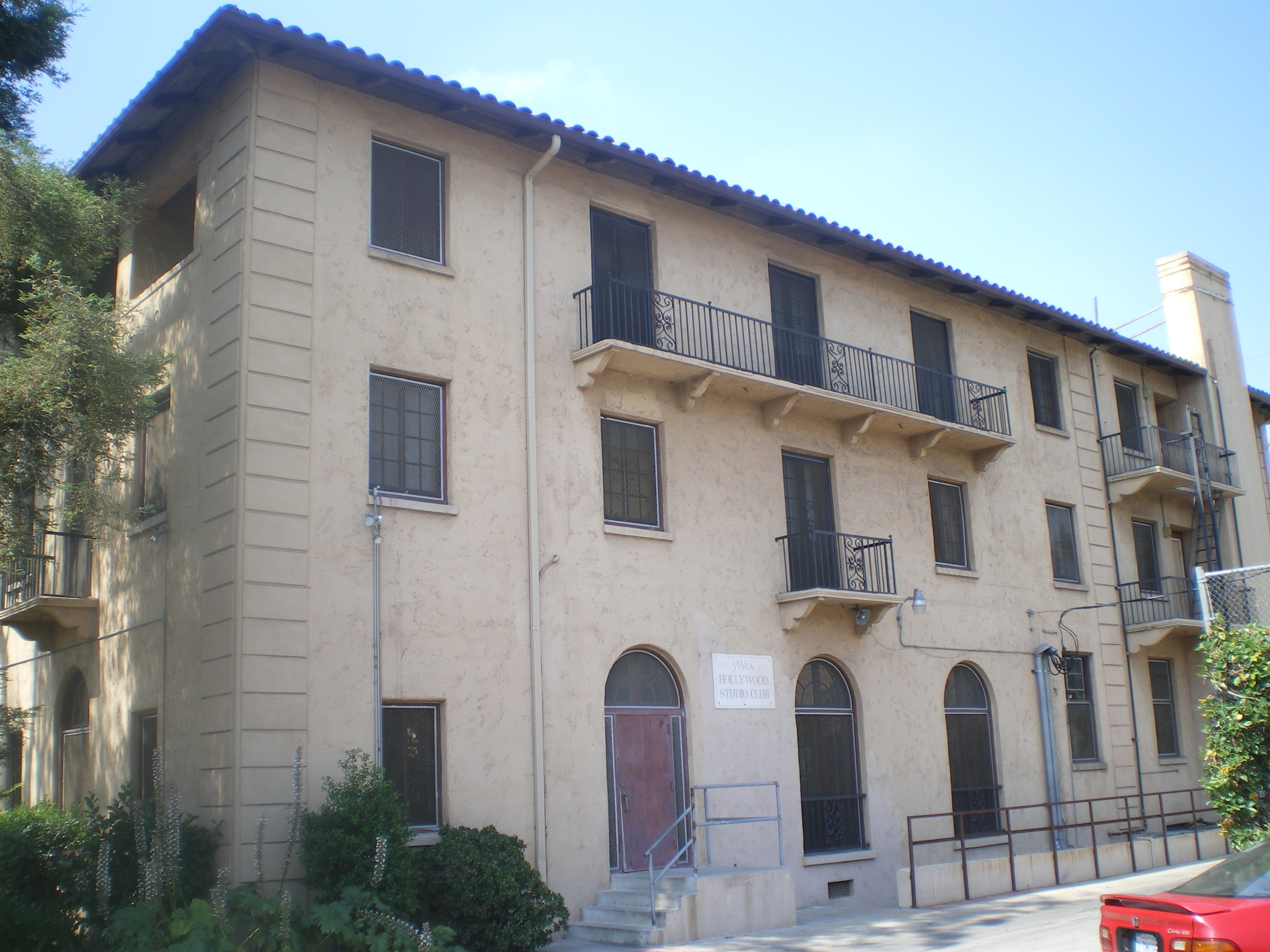
North wing of the Studio Club

Julia Morgan designed the Studio Club in a Mediterranean style with interiors decorated in "pistache green, rose coral, and tan." The large building has three sections—a central section with connecting wings on each side. The entrance to the center section is marked by a loggia, three archways with decorative quoins. There is also a painted frieze above the main entrance. The building includes several recurring elements from Morgan's Mediterranean style buildings, including full-length arched windows, balconies with iron balustrades, and decorative brackets. A writer in California Graphic said "this beautiful and spacious new building is but one more jewel in the crown of Achieved Results which this progressive and cultural little city is wearing so proudly and shows its ever increasing desire to give unstinted moral and financial support to every progressive endeavor."

The rooms at the Studio Club had nameplates on the doors identifying individuals who made subscriptions of at least $1,000 to the building fund. (Note: $1,000 in 1926 equates to approximately $18,000 in 2025, according to calculations based on the consumer price index in the United States measure of inflation.) There were rooms named for Douglas Fairbanks, Howard Hughes, Gloria Swanson, Jackie Coogan, and Harold Lloyd.

== Operation ==
"Map of Hollywood" from Jan. 1927 Photoplay article showing directions to studios from Hollywood Studio Club

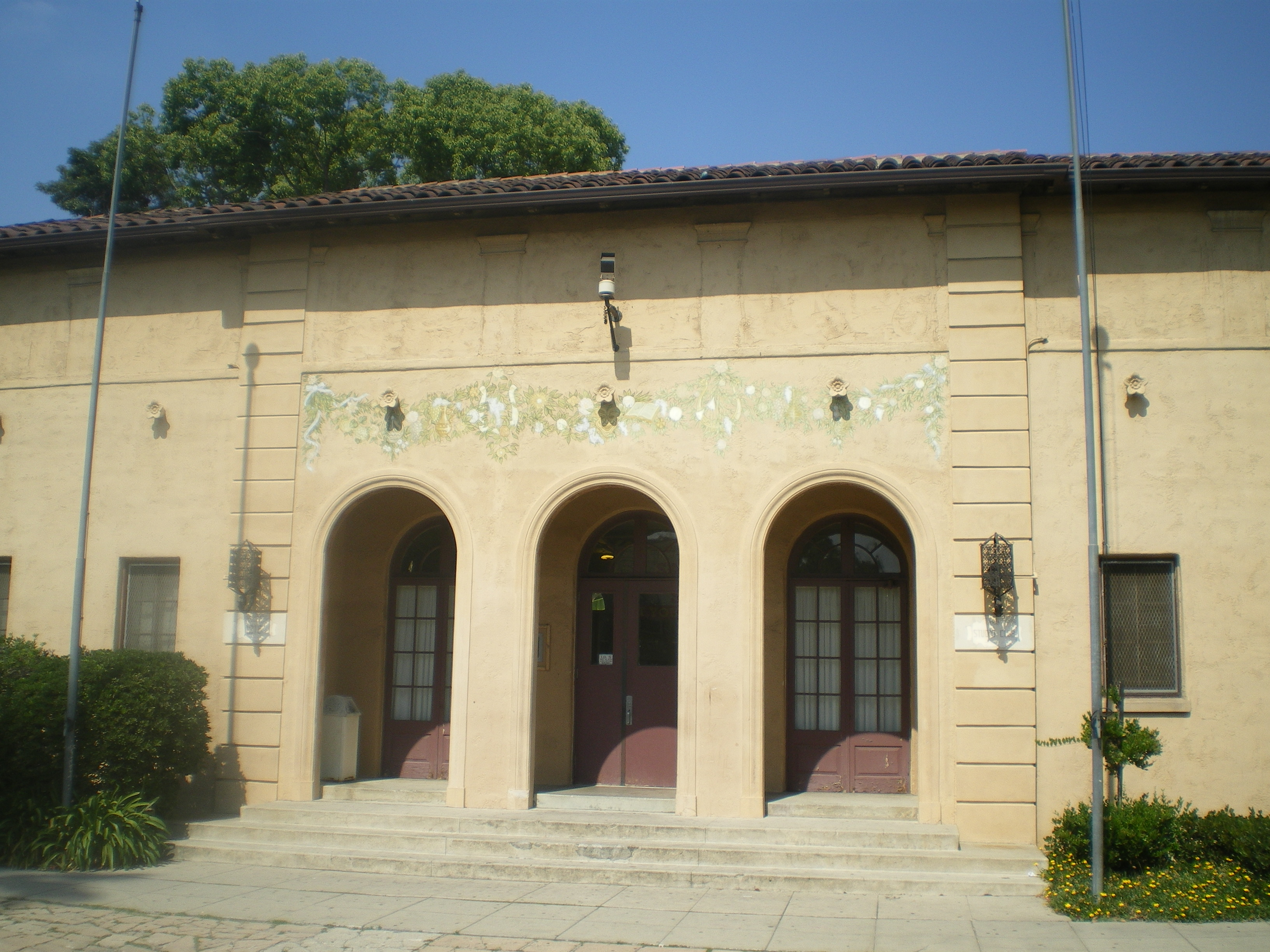
Front entrance, 2008

The only qualification needed for admittance to the Studio Club was that the applicant had to be seeking a career in the motion picture business, whether as an actress, singer, script girl, cutter, writer, designer, dancer or secretary. Some referred to it as a sorority, and the Studio Club also offered classes in various aspects of the performing arts, as well as hosting dances, teas, dinners and occasional plays, fashion shows and stunt nights. The club also provided residents with two meals a day, sewing machines, hair driers, laundry equipment, typewriters, theater literature, practice rooms, stage and sundeck. Former resident Rosemary Breckler recalled, "At the Studio Club, when we had a date, he waited anxiously and almost reverently downstairs, and then, dressed like princesses, we floated down those gorgeous stairs." A newspaper article in 1946 described the club this way: "The Hollywood Studio Club has been thought by the unknowing to be a house filled with glamour girls constantly receiving boxes of long-stemmed roses. On the other hand it has been classified as a rescue home for wayward girls. It is neither of these. The club is a comfortable sorority house possessing many of the freedoms and comforts of a man's club. It has grown in 24 years from the home for 22 girls and a white mouse into the home of 100 girls with another 100 servicewomen equally at home in the adjoining guest house." In postwar 1947, residents paid weekly rates of $12-17 (breakfast and dinner included), but were required to demonstrate an income of at least $25 weekly. The young women enjoyed access to “pianos and practice rooms…typewriters…telephones and message service, sewing machines…a large library…washing machine, irons, clothes dryers, a kitchenette and a sun deck.” A 1959 article referred to the club as a "colony" of students and described the atmosphere this way: "You may hear the wail of a clarinet, the vocal exercise of a balladeer ... and seen in a quiet corner, the silent gestures of a rehearsing ingenue with a script. But most of all there are clustered groups recounting their day – of pounding pavements, hearing of jobs, lamenting and blessing their luck and philosophizing." In 2000, Susan Spano wrote in the Los Angeles Times: "The handsome Italianate building, designed in 1926 by architect Julia Morgan (of Hearst Castle fame), still evokes the good old days when a mother could send her daughter to Hollywood to become a star without worrying that her offspring would go astray." However, the Studio Club was not free from scandal. Actress and former Studio Club resident Virginia Sale recalled, "One woman, older than the rest of us, was murdered in front of the club by a boyfriend. He was an ex-serviceman or something like that. And he then killed himself."

== Closure ==
By the mid-1960s, times had changed, and the idea of a chaperoned dormitory had become dated. In 1964, the club expanded its membership to include studio secretaries, dancers, models and others working broadly in the talent field. The club was losing money, and the YWCA Greater Los Angeles considered using it for executive offices or selling it until a petition drive by residents persuaded the YWCA to keep the facility open. By 1971, the club was forced to open its doors as a regular hotel for transient women and stopped serving meals, but it still lost money. Changes in the fire code also took a toll, as modifications needed to bring the structure up to fire code were estimated at $60,000. (Note: $60,000 in 1975 equates to approximately $359,000 in 2025, according to calculations based on the consumer price index in the United States measure of inflation.) In 1975, the Studio Club closed its doors. At the time of the closure, the Los Angeles Times wrote:

They are tales of happier times, when the Studio Club was a haven for all those young girls – nearly 10,000 of them – who had come to Hollywood from little towns across the country to seek fame in the motion picture business. Some of them made it. Most of them didn't. While they were here, though, the club tried to be what it said it was, a substitute home for the one each had left. Today, the Studio Club is gone. The building on Lodi Place just a few blocks from Sunset and Vine closed last week, a victim of changing times and new fire codes. 'It's out of vogue to live in a club atmosphere,' said actress Dorothy Malone, a Studio Club alumna from the mid-'40s. 'They never allowed men in the rooms and girls didn't live with their boyfriends then,' she explained.

The city of Los Angeles began using it in 2018 as a 64-bed crisis housing facility for women.

== Famous residents ==
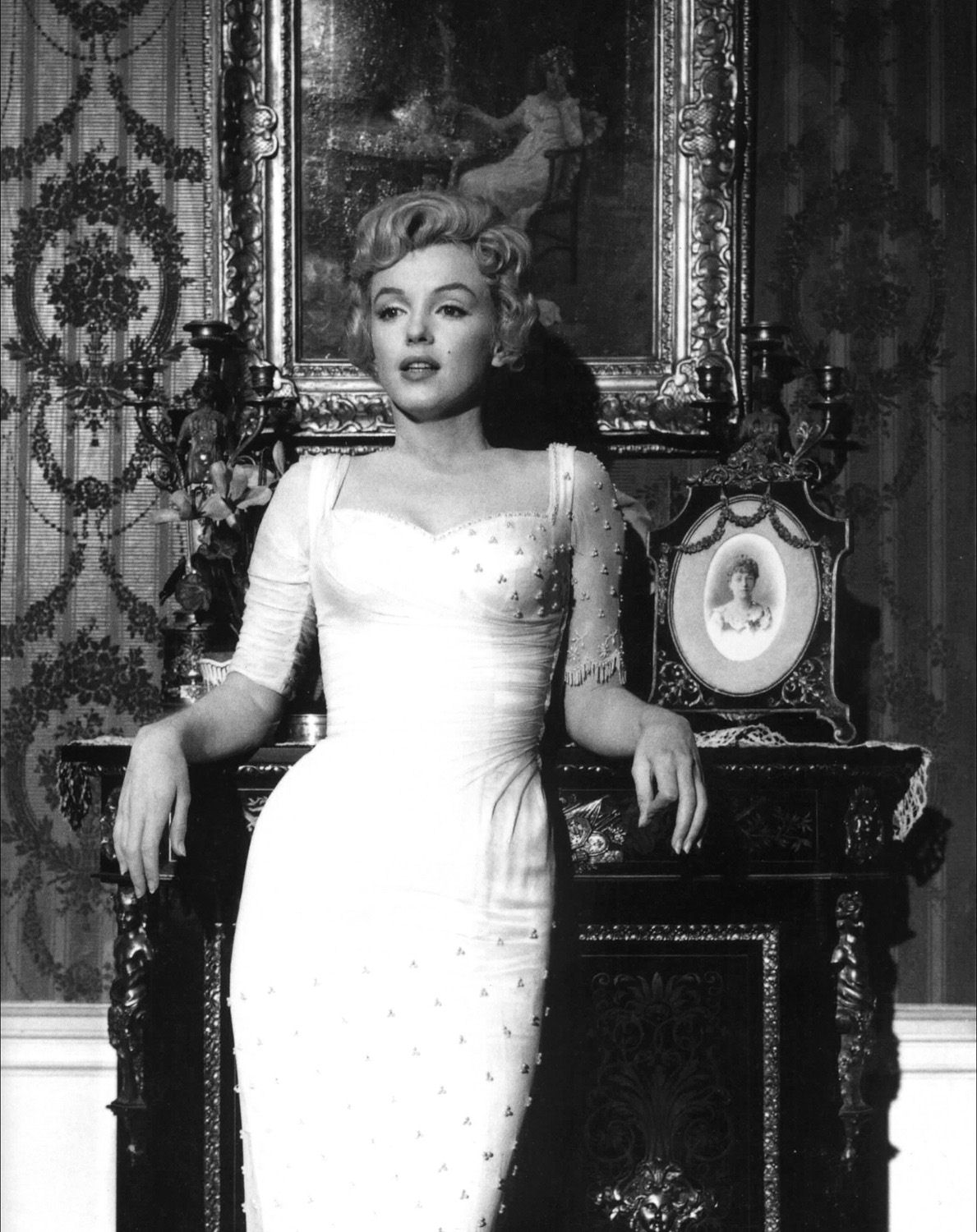
Marilyn Monroe posed nude to earn $50 for rent money at the Studio Club.

Over the years of its operation, the Studio Club was home to many budding starlets and others trying to make it in show business. Those residing at the club included:

- ZaSu Pitts – Pitts, the star of Erich von Stroheim's 1924 masterpiece, Greed, was one of the first stars to come out of the Studio Club. Von Stroheim called Pitts "the greatest dramatic actress." Pitts later noted that "without the club I should have been a village dressmaker all my days."
- Ayn Rand – When Ayn Rand arrived in Hollywood in 1926 to become a screenwriter, she lived at the Studio Club. Though her heavy accent and plain Russian clothes made her an "odd apparition" to the pretty, fresh actresses of the Studio Club, Rand was welcomed into the sorority. She was hired initially as an extra, at a salary of $7.50 a day, (Note: $7.50 in 1926 equates to approximately $136 in 2025, according to calculations based on the consumer price index in the United States measure of inflation.) leaving the Studio Club before dawn each day to arrive at the studio at 6 a.m. for makeup and dress. While staying at the Studio Club, she met both Cecil B. DeMille and her future husband, Frank. A club resident later recalled the following story about Rand:

We all had money problems, but the funniest story I ever heard was about Ayn Rand, the author. She apparently had terrible financial problems and owed money to the club. Almost everybody did at one time or another. Anyhow, a woman was going to donate $50 to the neediest girl in the club, and Miss Williams (Marjorie Williams, the revered director of Studio Club from 1922 to 1945) picked out Ayn. Ayn thanked them for the money, went out and bought a set of black lingerie.

- Maureen O'Sullivan – Actress Maureen O'Sullivan, who played Jane in the Tarzan movies of the 1930s and early 1940s and starred in The Devil Doll, took up residence at the Studio Club when her mother brought her to Hollywood from Ireland.
- Virginia Sale – Sale, who went on to have more than 150 film and television credits, also started at the Studio Club. Years later, Sale recalled her friendship with Ayn Rand at the club in the 1920s. Though Rand largely kept to herself, Rand encouraged Sale in her writing of skits. "She (Rand) did the sound effects for me backstage and that was really where my one-woman show got started, right at the club. Over the years on tour I gave 3,000 performances." (Sale is one of the women in the picture above shown "cleaning house.")
- Diana Dill – Diana Dill was an actress living at the Studio Club when she met Kirk Douglas, whom she married in 1943.
- Marie Windsor – Windsor, who found a niche in film noir and became known as "Queen of the B's", won two beauty pageants in Utah before driving to Hollywood to become a star. She lived at the Studio Club when she arrived in Hollywood, stayed for three years (the maximum stay period) and later returned for six more months after World War II.
- Dorothy Malone – Malone, who later received an Academy Award for her role in Written on the Wind, lived in the Studio Club in the 1940s after moving to Hollywood from Texas. She later recalled that the Studio Club was already famous as a home for aspiring young actresses. She said, "You had to have references and a letter from your parents just to get in. There was a long waiting list from the beginning." She dated Mel Torme while living at the club and recalled being discovered by Alan Ladd while playing a Spanish girl in a showcase at the club; but when she reported to the studio without the black hair, they did not believe she was the same person.
- Marilyn Monroe – Monroe lived at the Studio Club from 1948 to 1949. She later recalled that it was to raise $50 to pay rent at the Studio Club that she posed for the famous nude photographs. (Note: $50 in 1949 equates to approximately $680 in 2025, according to calculations based on the consumer price index in the United States measure of inflation.) She said, "Funny how shocked people in Hollywood were when they learned I'd posed in the nude. At one time I'd always said no when photographers asked me. But you'll do it when you get hungry enough. It was at a time when I didn't seem to have much future. I had no job and no money for the rent. I was living in the Hollywood Studio Club for Girls. I told them I'd get the rent somehow. So I phoned up Tom Kelley, and he took these two colour shots—one sitting up, the other lying down. ... I earned the fifty dollars that I needed." Monroe stayed in Room 334.
- Kim Novak – Kim Novak was the biggest star to live at the Studio Club in the 1950s. When Harry Cohn, president of Columbia Pictures, signed Novak to a studio contract, he required that she not date anyone during the week and posted a studio guard outside the Hollywood Studio Club, where he required her to live. Novak moved into the Studio Club in 1953 and stayed on at the club even after she became a movie star. Another resident at the time recalled, "She was very neat and clean. Nobody could look more glamorous in a man's white shirt and Levi's. I remember she just couldn't bear to leave. In those years we had raised the limit of time to five years."
- Barbara Eden – In the 1950s, before landing her role on I Dream of Jeannie, Eden lived at the Studio Club. Other club residents later recalled that Eden would look at the club's bulletin board and apply for every show business job available, even those that she was advised would "ruin" her career.
- Sharon Tate – Tate, who was murdered by the Manson Family in 1969, lived at the Studio Club when she began her career in Hollywood in 1963. When her aggressive roommate at the Club made lesbian advances, Tate requested a new room.
- Joanne Worley – Worley, who went on to fame in Laugh In, lived at the Studio Club in the 1960s. She recalled, "I remember it was a wonderful place. ... It was inexpensive, had good food and 24-hour telephone service. And on Sundays the best coffee cake I ever ate."

Other residents of the Studio Club included Donna Reed (star of It's A Wonderful Life, The Donna Reed Show, and Oscar winner for From Here to Eternity); Rita Moreno (winner of an Academy Award in 1961 for West Side Story, a Grammy Award in 1972, a Tony Award in 1975, and the Presidential Medal of Freedom in 2004); Linda Darnell (star of Forever Amber, Unfaithfully Yours, and A Letter to Three Wives in the late 1940s); Nancy Kwan (star of The World of Suzie Wong, and Flower Drum Song in the early 1960s); Barbara Rush (Golden Globe winner for It Came from Outer Space and star of The Young Philadelphians); Janet Blair (movie star in the 1940s in films including Three Girls About Town, Broadway, and Gallant Journey); Elvia Allman (voice of Clarabelle Cow in 28 Disney cartoons, the homely woman pursuing Bob Hope in Road to Singapore, Cora Dithers in the Blondie radio series, and the aggressive forelady in the chocolate candy conveyor belt episode of I Love Lucy who yells, "Speed'er up a little!"); Barbara Britton (star of Captain Kidd and The Virginian in the mid-1940s); Gale Storm (star of the 1950s television series My Little Margie, The Gale Storm Show, and singer of the hit song Dark Moon); Joan Blackman (actress in Blue Hawaii); Evelyn Keyes (Scarlet O'Hara's younger sister in Gone with the Wind and real-life spouse of Charles Vidor, John Huston, and Artie Shaw); Ann B. Davis (two-time Emmy Award winner as "Schultzy" in The Bob Cummings Show and housekeeper Alice in The Brady Bunch); Sally Struthers (Gloria from All in the Family); and Farrah Fawcett, (four-time Primetime Emmy Award nominee and six-time Golden Globe Award nominee who rose to international fame when she played a starring role in the 1976 first season of the television series Charlie's Angels).

== Recognition as historic site ==
The Hollywood Studio Club has been recognized as a building of significant historic importance at both the local and national level. In 1977, the Studio Club was designated a Historic-Cultural Monument (No. 175) by the City of Los Angeles. And in 1980, it was listed in the National Register of Historic Places.

In 1994, an episode of Visiting... with Huell Howser featured a tour of the Hollywood Studio Club and reminiscences of several women who lived there.

== See also ==
- List of YWCA buildings
- List of works by Julia Morgan
- List of Registered Historic Places in Los Angeles
- List of Los Angeles Historic-Cultural Monuments in Hollywood
