= Mary Andrews Clark Memorial Home =

- U.S. National Register of Historic Places
- Los Angeles Historic-Cultural Monument
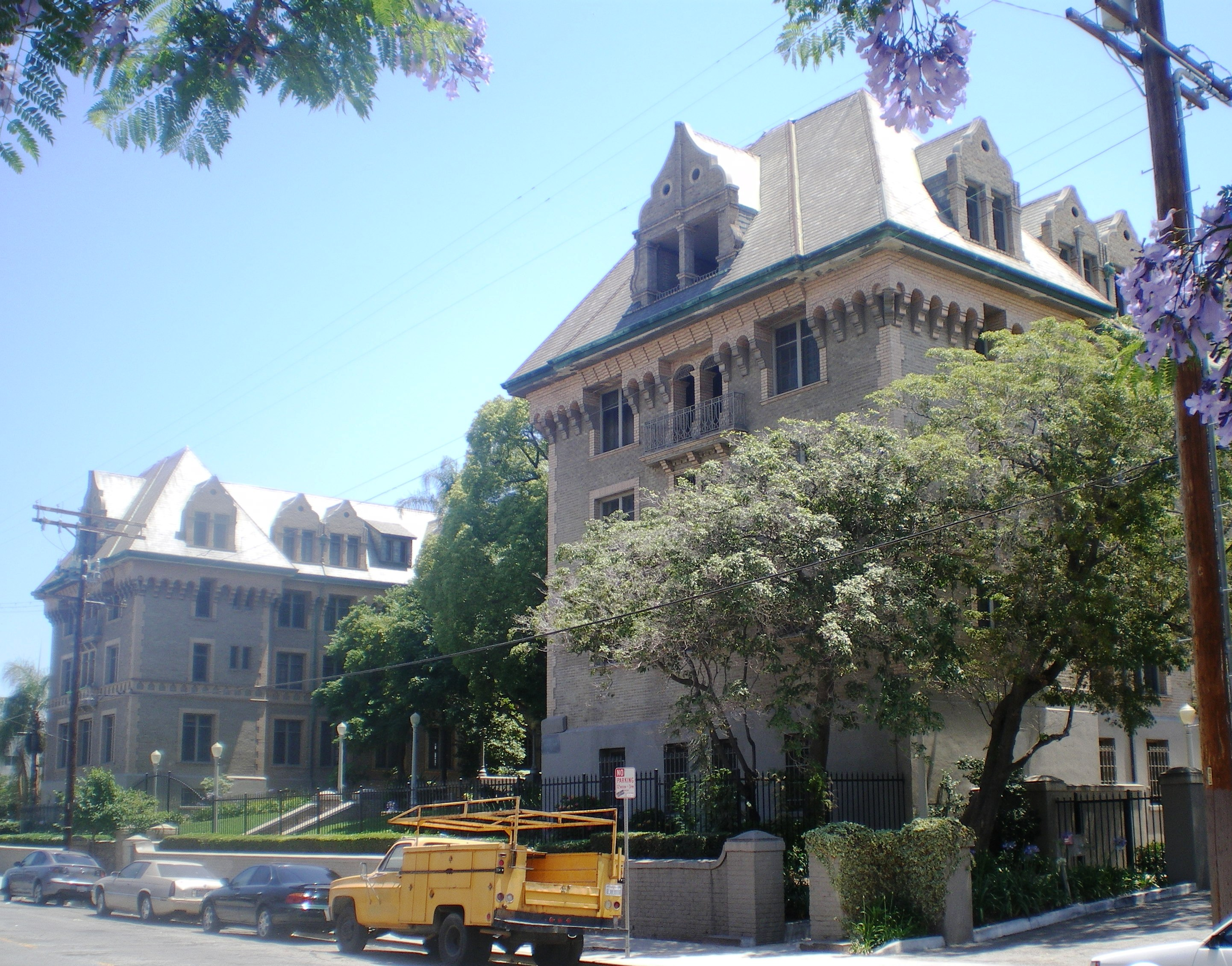
- Mary Andrews Clark Memorial Home

- Location within the Los Angeles metropolitan area Location within California Location within the United States
- Location: 306–336 S. Loma Dr., Los Angeles, California
- Coordinates: 34°3′36″N 118°15′51″W
- Built: 1912
- Architect: Benton, Arthur Burnett; Whyte, George H.
- Architectural style: Châteauesque, Late 19th and 20th Century Revival
- NRHP reference No.: 95001152
- LAHCM No.: 158

Significant dates
- Added to NRHP: October 5, 1995
- Designated LAHCM: 1976-07-07

Mary Andrews Clark Memorial Home is a four-story, 76,000-square-foot (7,100 m^{2}) "French Revival Chateauesque" brick structure in the Westlake neighborhood of Los Angeles near downtown. It was built in 1913 as a YWCA home for young working women.

The house was built by William A. Clark (1839–1925), the copper magnate after whom Clark County, Nevada, was named, as a memorial to his mother Mary Andrews Clark (1814–1904). The home was operated by the YWCA from 1913 to 1987, when it was closed as a result of damage sustained in the Whittier Narrows earthquake. The building reopened in 1995 as housing for low income single workers. The building has been designated a Los Angeles Historic-Cultural Monument, and is listed on the National Register of Historic Places.

== Construction and dedication ==
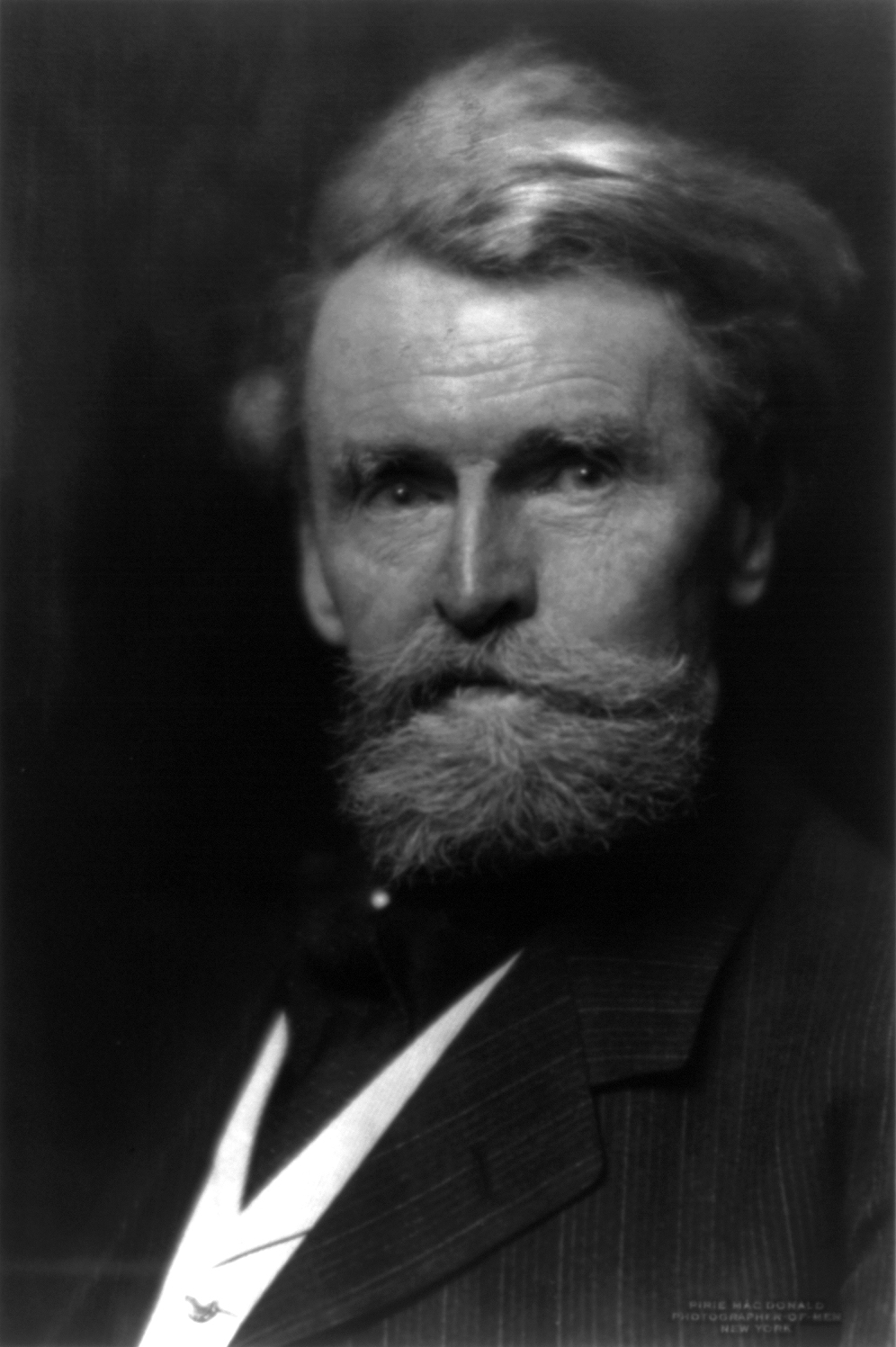
Portrait of Sen. William A. Clark

The Mary Andrews Clark Home was built by former U.S. Senator and Montana copper magnate William A. Clark, "as a perpetual memorial" to his mother, who died in Los Angeles. Clark announced the gift in 1910 after acquiring a 350 by 180-foot (55 m) lot on top of Crown Hill, a short distance west of Downtown Los Angeles. Clark said the structure to be built on the site would be a home for young women who work for a living, "where they can live in delight and comfort at a price which every woman can afford." It was "four stories and basement. 190 x 132 feet, built around a court. ... exterior facing of pressed brick and roof of tile or slate. In addition to the parlors, assembly room, dining room, library, etc., there will be 130 living rooms, each of which will have lavatory and toilet.... cost $150,000."

On seeing the architectural plans for the new home, the Los Angeles Times reported: "The home, beautiful architecturally and ideal in its conception, will rank as one of the finest in the country." The building, described at the time as a French chateau type building, was dedicated in February 1913 "as a memorial not only to his own mother but as a shrine where thousands of young women in the coming years may worship the memory of their good mothers."

The building, designed by Arthur Burnett Benton (1858–1927), with many gables, cupolas, turrets and balconies, was turned over to the YWCA, having been built and furnished at a total cost of $500,000. Not less than 3,000 persons visited the home for the first public reception in May 1913, and the Los Angeles Times described the building, lawns and rose garden as a "Visitors' Mecca."

== Operation as a home for young working women ==
The home's first annual report was issued in February 1914. It noted that the average price paid for board was $5.05 a week, which included a room, two meals a day (three on Sundays and holidays), and free use of laundry and sewing machines. The home at that time offered a literary club, Bible study, a library, dancing, tennis courts, bowling lanes, and a gymnasium. The boarders at the time included 66 stenographers, 28 "instructors," 27 "office helpers," 20 saleswomen, 16 bookkeepers, 10 dressmakers, 6 nurses, 5 artists, 5 manicurists, 4 milliners, 4 secretaries and 2 librarians.

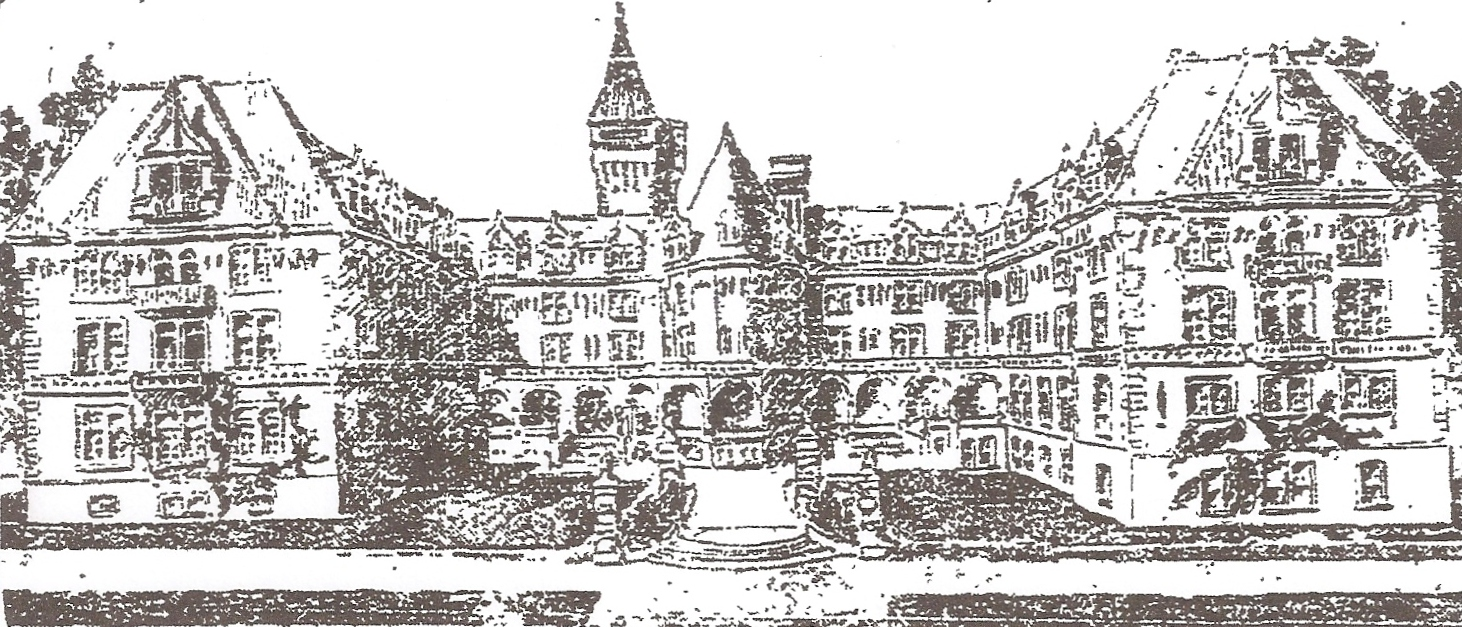
Drawing of planned Mary Andrews Clark Home, 1911

By 1923, more than 200 "girls" were on the waiting list for entrance into the home. In 1926, the Times described the Clark Home as a haven for "the great influx of feminine workers" into the booming Los Angeles metropolis:

It could accommodate 200 in its beautiful old gray stone French chateau which in appearance suggests anything else but a home for working girls. In fact, its immaculately kept lawns, wide verandas and inviting lawn-tennis court seem more in line with the advantages that are usually associated with the residence of a family of wealth and position than the home of girls who find it necessary to work for a living.

Even in 1938 it was described as "one of the show places of the city."

The home's popularity continued in the years after World War II. In 1948, the home housed women between 18 and 30 years old in either single or double rooms, each room was equipped with a lavatory, and with tubs and showers located on each floor. Residents were permitted at that time to have the company of male friends in small sitting rooms or the game room, with one staff member noting that the place "literally swarms with young men" on the weekends. If a resident took advantage of this freedom, she was "taught through counseling that she must do nothing to disturb the other inmates or to give Clark Residence a bad name in the community."

== Lawsuit by Clark heirs ==
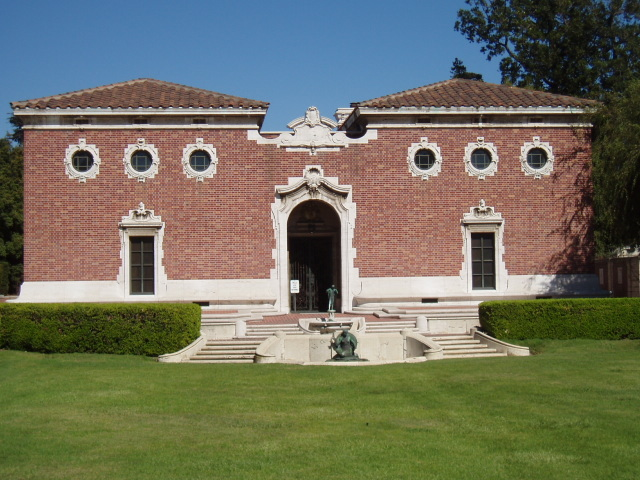
The William Andrews Clark Memorial Library in West Adams is another Los Angeles landmark built by the Clark family.

In 1954, heirs of Senator Clark sued the YWCA over its alleged violation of the terms of the agreement under which the home was deeded to the YWCA. The suit alleged that the YWCA had improperly depleted the home's trust fund, terminated Clark's niece as chairman of the home's management committee, and adopted new by-laws under which it assumed the right to appoint a chairman of the management committee. For 35 years, the home had been managed by a committee composed of women members of the Clark family and others of their choosing; however, in 1949, the YWCA asserted the right to take complete control by appointing committee members independently. The suit also expressed concern that the national YWCA had allegedly been infiltrated by communists and its board had balked at signing loyalty oaths "declaring their loyalty to this nation." The suit was settled in 1955, with the YWCA assuming full control of the home and the old management committee acknowledging that its term of office had expired.

== Operation from 1960s through 1980s ==
Even as social rules loosened in the 1960s and 1970s, the Clark Home continued to operate under strict rules for its residents. In 1963, the Los Angeles Times reported: "Clark girls today live much as the first Clark residents did – in private rooms, taking their meals in a well-appointed dining room (slacks and curlers are not permitted at dinner) and twice weekly they dine by candlelight."

All ages of women were living at Clark Residence and the home otherwise continued to operate under strict rules: no alcohol on the premises; no men upstairs; and no wearing shorts in the recreation room. House director, Mildred Arnold, said the rule on male visitors was strictly enforced: "One violation and a girl would be out. They know the rules." A Los Angeles Times reporter noted that the upper floors had been made "nearly impregnable", and the building director was reluctant even to allow a Times photographer to take pictures of a room. Despite the strict rules, residents enjoyed the added security provided by the home, with staff patrolling the home during the day and a watchman at the door through the night. Residents were also attracted by the low rent and amenities; residents in 1982 paid about $280 per month for a private room, including two meals a day and weekly maid and linen service.

== Closure and conversion to low-income housing ==
The home was operated by the Y.W.C.A. until 1987, when damage caused by the Whittier Narrows earthquake required the building to be closed. In 1990, the YWCA sold the building for $3 million to the Los Angeles Community Design Center, a nonprofit group, and Crescent Bay Co., a Santa Monica developer. The new owner renovated the building and reopened it in 1995 as housing for low income single workers making less than $17,650 per year. In order to preserve the building's original materials, woodwork, tiles and other materials "were marked, removed for restoration, then puzzled back together." The total cost of the renovation was $16 million in combined public and private funds.

== Historic designation ==
The Clark Home was recognized as a Los Angeles Historic-Cultural Monument (HCM #158) by the Los Angeles Cultural Heritage Commission in 1976, and was listed on the National Register of Historic Places in 1995.

== Use as shooting location ==
The house has been used as a shooting location for many television and motion picture productions, including "Eleanor and Franklin: The White House Years" (1977), "Winds of War" (1983), "Whiz Kids" (1983), "The Twilight Zone" (1985), "Twins" (1988), "The Rocketeer" (1991), "Mr. Saturday Night" (1992), “American Pie 2” (2001), "Raise Your Voice" (2004), Teen Wolf (2014), The Cable Guy (1996), Ouija (2014), Annabelle (2017) and Brooklyn Nine Nine (2018), Westworld (2022)

== See also ==
- List of Los Angeles Historic-Cultural Monuments in the Wilshire and Westlake areas
- National Register of Historic Places listings in Los Angeles
- William A. Clark
- William Andrews Clark Memorial Library
