= Hwang Kyung Koh =

South Korean physician (1909–2000)

- Born: 1909; Hansŏng, Korean Empire
- Died: 2000 (aged 90–91)
- Occupations: Founder and First President of Seoul Women's University

Korean name
- Hangul: 고황경
- Hanja: 高凰京
- RR: Go Hwanggyeong
- MR: Ko Hwanggyŏng

Art name
- Hangul: 바롬
- RR: Barom
- MR: Parom

Hwang Kyung Koh (Korean: 고황경; Hanja: 高凰京; 1909–2000) was the founder and first President of Seoul Women's University. She is also known by her art name Bahrom, which means "to live right".

Koh's father was a physician and professor at Severance Medical College (now the medical school of Yonsei University). She studied at Ewha Womans College and Doshisha Women's College in Japan before completing her doctorate at Michigan State University.

Koh established Seoul Women's University in 1961 to provide educational opportunities to the women of Korea.
