= List of historic properties in Clifton, Arizona =

- Town
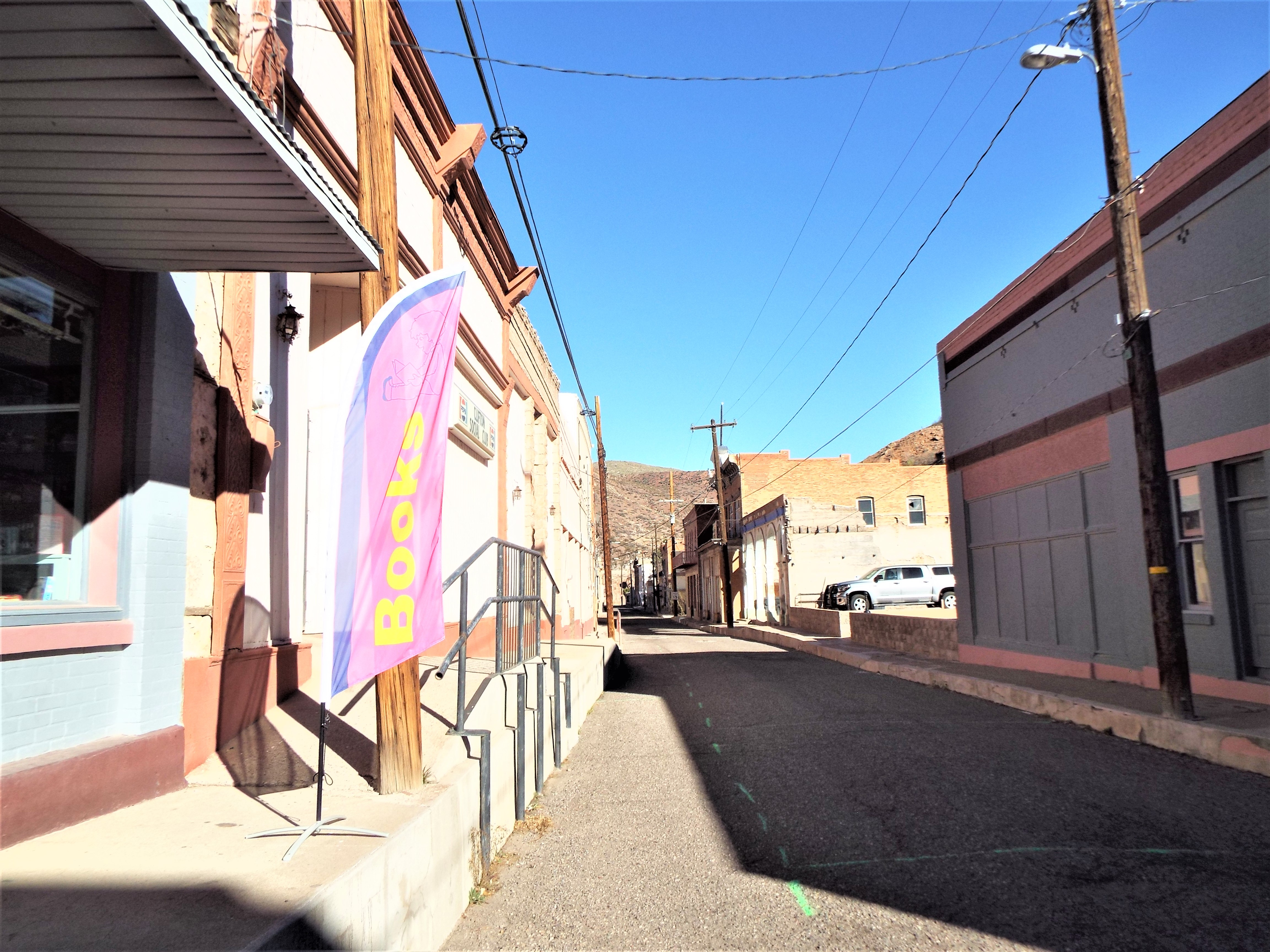
- Historic Chase Creek Street

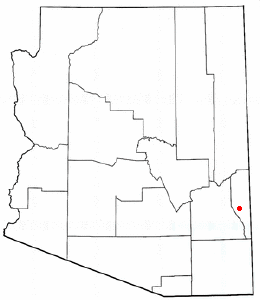
- Map of Clifton in the Greenlee County of the state of Arizona

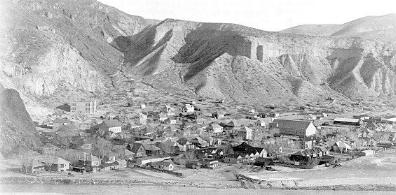
Clifton in 1903

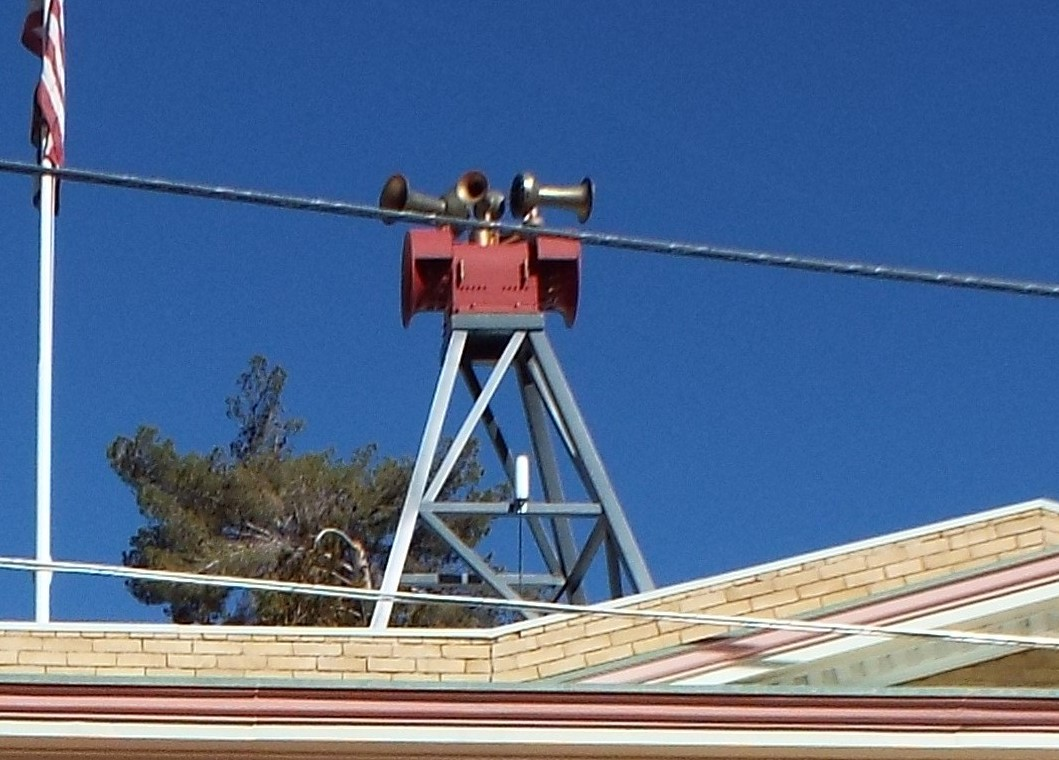
Flood alarm system

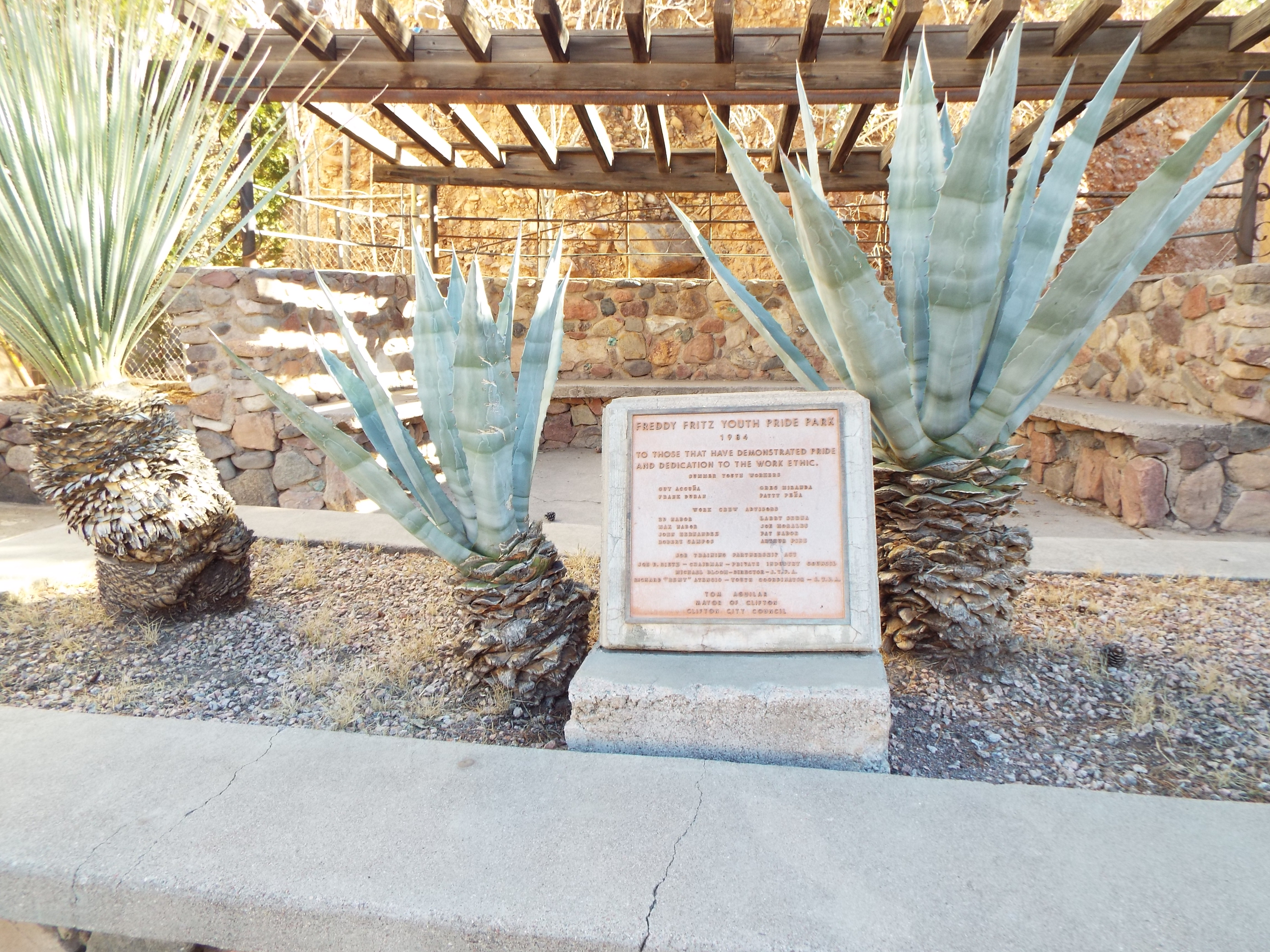
Freddy Fritz Youth Park established in 1984

This is a list, which includes a photographic gallery, of some of the remaining historic buildings, houses, bridges, structures and monuments in the mining town of Clifton, which is located in Greenlee County, Arizona. The Clifton Townsite Historic District is a historic district that covers 37 acres (15 ha) and was listed on the National Register of Historic Places on March 1, 1990, reference: #90000339. Some of the structures are within the historic Chase Creek Commercial District. There are some structures which are located on Coronado Trail and Park Avenue. Also, included in this list are photographs of the town's flood gates, built to protect South Clifton from flooding, the Clifton Cliff Jail and the Baby-gauge “Number 8” locomotive used in the mines.

== Brief history ==
The specimens of pottery and stone implements found in the cliff dwellings along the San Francisco River by archaeologists are indications of the existence of an advanced ancient native-American civilization, such as the Anasazi, in the area hundreds of years before both Fray Marcos de Niza and Francisco Vasquez de Coronado passed through the area.

=== New Spain ===
The mission of the Spanish explorers led by Vázquez de Coronado was to find the Seven Golden Cities. Vázquez de Coronado at the time was serving as governor of a province in New Spain (in Mexico). When he heard reports of the legend of the Seven Golden Cities, which he believed were located north of Mexico's western coast, he organized an expedition which eventually passed through the area where Clifton is currently located. The two main tribes of Native Americans who eventually lived in the area called themselves Dineh, "the people”. The Navajo stayed in northern Arizona, and those in the south became known as Apaches, or "enemies”. The Apaches, who became the dominant force, were hunters, gatherers, and raiders of the more sedentary groups they found here.

=== New Mexico ===
In 1821, Mexico became independent from Spain. The territory that includes present-day New Mexico and Arizona was designated as "New Mexico”. Hats made from the fur of beavers were very popular in the 1800s. There was a team of mountain men and trappers that were led by James Ohio Pattie in 1824 and 1825. They searched the San Francisco River edges for beavers in the area where Clifton is currently located.

In 1845, Mexico severed its relations with the United States because of the annexation of Texas by the United States. United States President James K. Polk declared war against Mexico in what became known as the Mexican–American War. The Mormon Battalion was among the troops which entered the area. Arizona north of the Gila River was taken by the United States under the terms of the Treaty of Guadalupe Hidalgo at the end of the war.

=== Arizona Territory ===
The California volunteers pursuing the Apaches in 1856 discovered the first minerals of the Clifton area. Conflicts between the Apaches and the advancing Anglo settlers resulted in a war known as the Apache Wars. The conflict with the Apaches lasted 26 years. Mining for gold and silver began in 1864, followed by copper in 1872.

The booming mining town of Clifton was officially founded in 1873. In 1874 the Longfellow Copper Mining Company, founded by Henry & Charles Lesinsky, built a smelter where Chase Creek emptied into the San Francisco River. Among the other mining companies that would be created in the area were the Arizona Copper Company and the Detroit Copper Company. In 1881, the Lesinsky brothers hired stonemason Margarito Varela to build the Clifton Cliff Jail. In 1882, the Lesinsky brothers sold their mining business to the Arizona Copper Company.

The town also had its share of outlaws as it continued to grow. Among the outlaws of Clifton was Kid Louis and his gang. Kid Louis and his gang robbed many of the local businesses and participated in many shoot-outs. He was always acquitted of his crimes. In 1882, he decided to rob the Detroit Copper Company's office in the town of Morenci and beat William Church, the manager, with his gun until Church opened the company's safe. He relieved him and the Detroit Copper Co. of all available currency. After the heist, Kid Louis and his gang went into town to celebrate. While celebrating he accidentally shot his girlfriend and he sent for the doctor. The doctor did not show up, and his girlfriend died. Kid Louis went looking for the doctor with the intention of killing him. On the same day in Ward's Canyon there was a posse of well-armed Mexicans, organized by a Mexican rancher who had had some of his cattle stolen, in search of the cattle-thieves. Kid Louis and two of his men ran into the posse, and shooting commenced between the two groups. It ended with the death of Kid Louis.

Greenlee County was created in 1909 and named for Mason Greenlee who was an early settler in the Clifton area. With the creation of Greenlee County on March 10, 1909, Clifton was chosen as its seat.

=== Abduction of orphan children ===
In 1904, Catholic nuns from New York City sent forty Irish orphans to Clifton by way of the railroad with the intention that they be adopted by Catholic families. As it turned out, most of the Catholic families in Clifton were Mexican. When the Anglo residents of the town found out, they became furious and kidnapped the children because they considered this an “interracial” transgression and claimed that placing a white child with a Mexican family was the same as child abuse. The group of vigilantes almost lynched the nuns and priest. The courts, including the U.S. Supreme Court, ruled against the Catholic Church, who claimed that the children should be returned, and ruled in favor of the vigilantes.

Lives and properties were lost as a result of the 1903 flood in Clifton. Thunderstorms with heavy rain created torrents of water which converged on the junction of Chase Creek and the San Francisco River, forming a crest that ripped through the length of Clifton. In 1906, there was an accident in one of the mining shafts, which gave way, and thousands of tons of rock and waste poured down upon three Mexican workers, who were instantly killed. In 1913, a devastating fire occurred on Chase Creek Street, killing five people and causing approximately $200,000 in property damage. Among the properties which were affected was the Cascarelli building, which at the time was Chase Creek's only three-story building. The new building is two-story and was built from the bricks of destroyed one. The reason that so many buildings (25) were destroyed by the fire was that there was no water available to help fight it.

== Greenlee County Historical Society ==
The Greenlee County Historical Society is located in the Eagle Hall building, now the Greenlee Historical Museum Building, built by Antonio and Ambrose Spezia in 1913, 299 Chase Creek Street. According to the Greenlee County Historical Society, their mission is the following: "The mission of the Greenlee County Historical Society shall be: to collect, preserve, interpret and disseminate relevant and historically significant materials pertaining to Greenlee County and Arizona and to develop and maintain ethical, effective and efficient professional standards in carrying out these endeavors for the benefit of present and future generations."

Jim McPherson, Arizona Preservation Foundation board president, has stated the following:

It is crucial that residents, private interests, and government officials act now to save these elements of our cultural heritage before it is too late.

Two individual structures are listed in the National Register of Historic Places (NRHP). They are:

- The Park Avenue Bridge (Zorilla Street Bridge) listed on September 30, 1988, reference: #88001661 and
- The Clifton Casa Grande listed on June 26, 1979, reference: #79003445.

On March 1, 1990, the National Register of Historic Places declared Clifton's Townsite a historic district; reference: #90000339. According to the NRHP, Clifton's historic significance is information potential, architecture/engineering, event and includes the periods of significance of 1850 to 1949. The district designation covers the confluence of Chase Creek and the San Francisco River

== Historic properties ==
=== Chase Creek Street ===
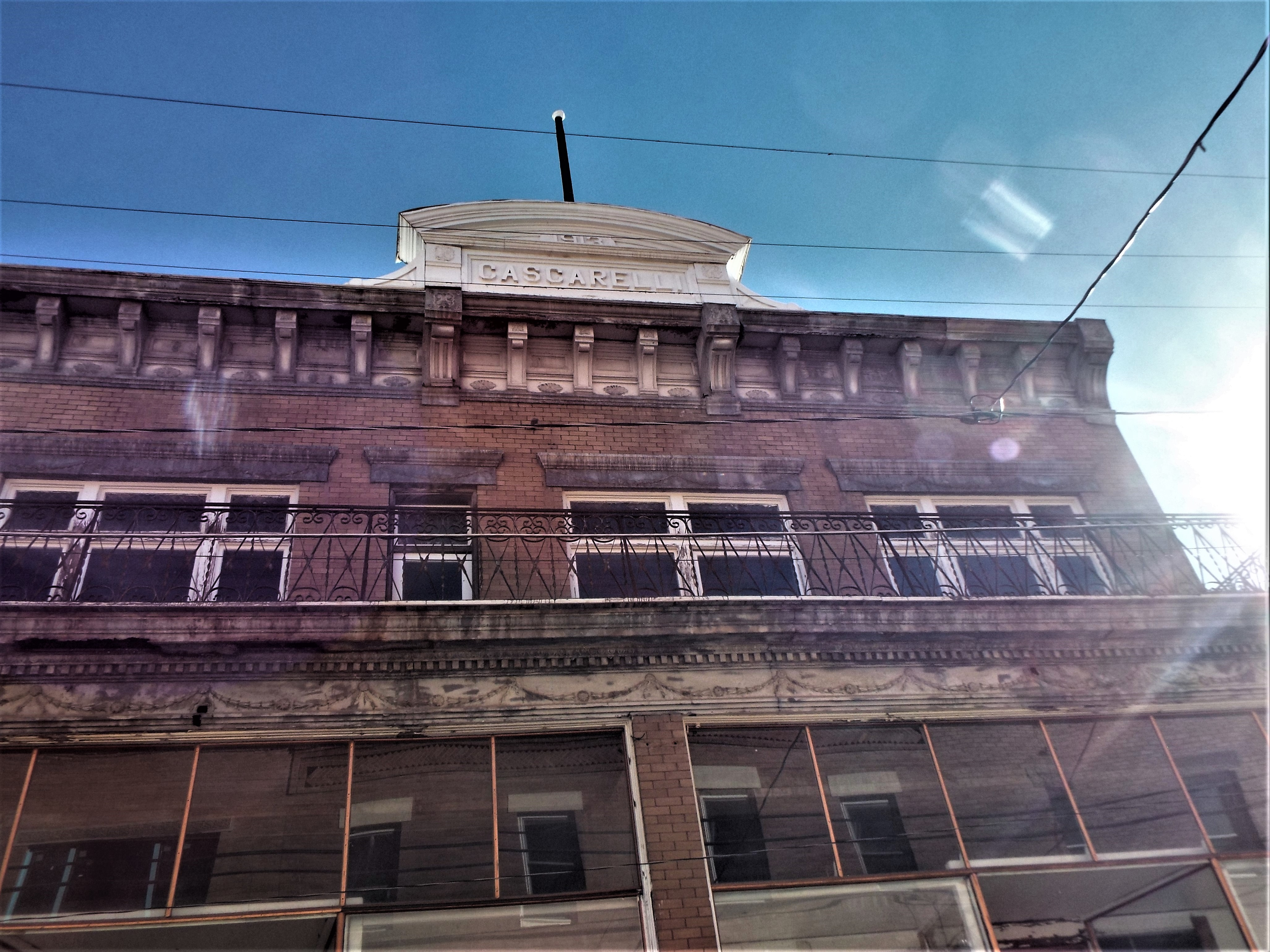
Cascarelli Building

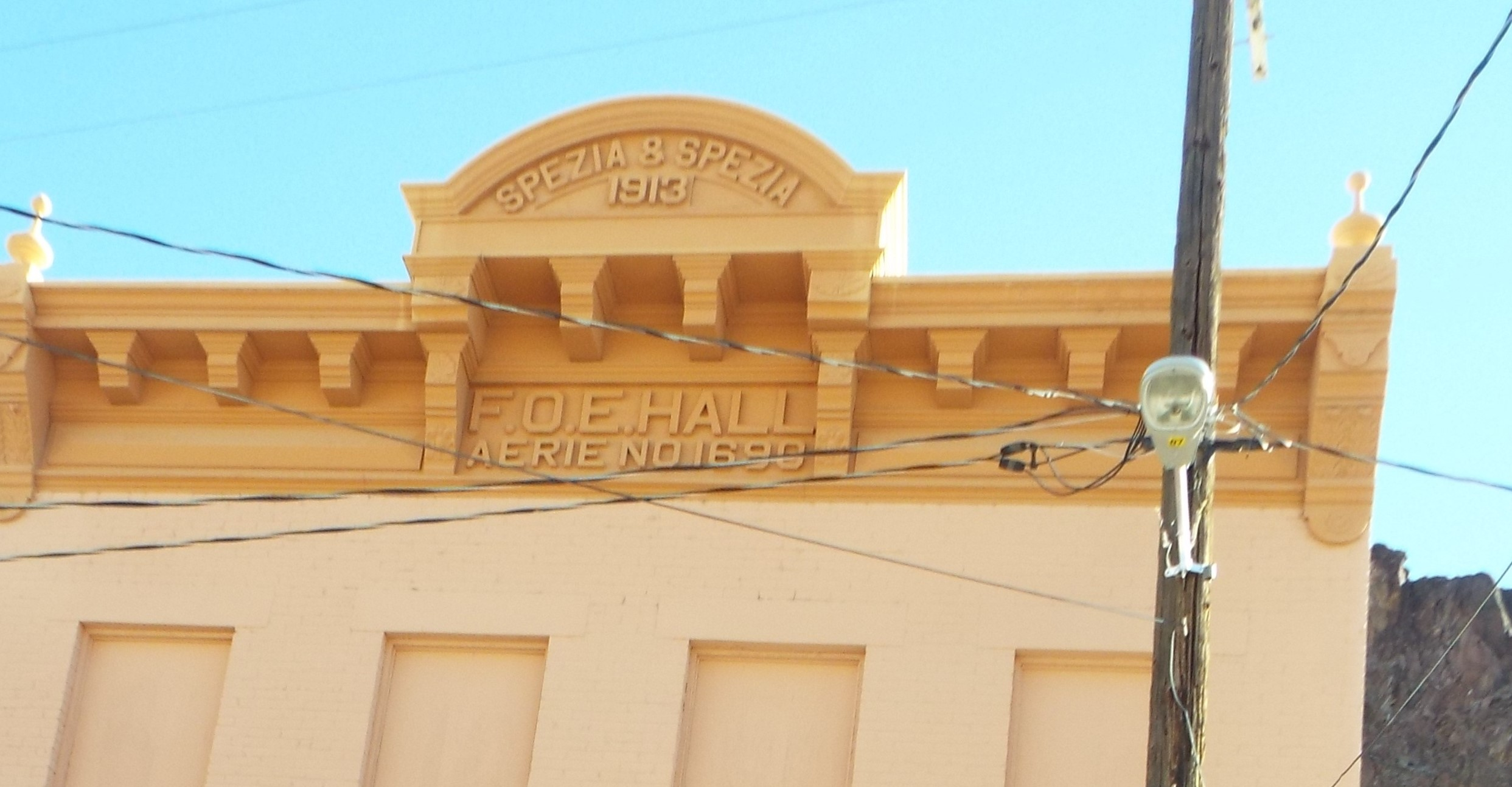
Eagle Hall

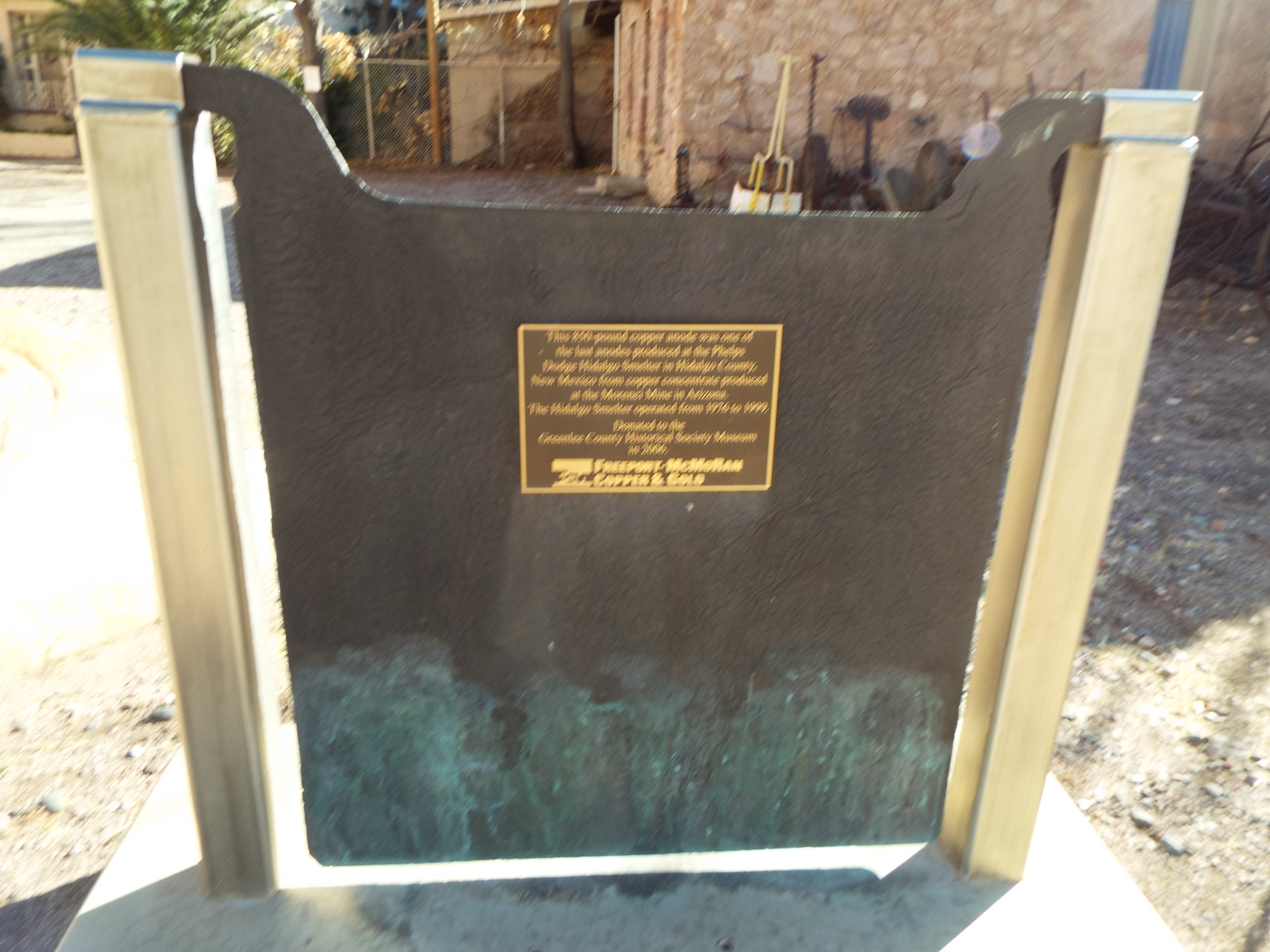
180 pound copper sheet in Case Creek Street

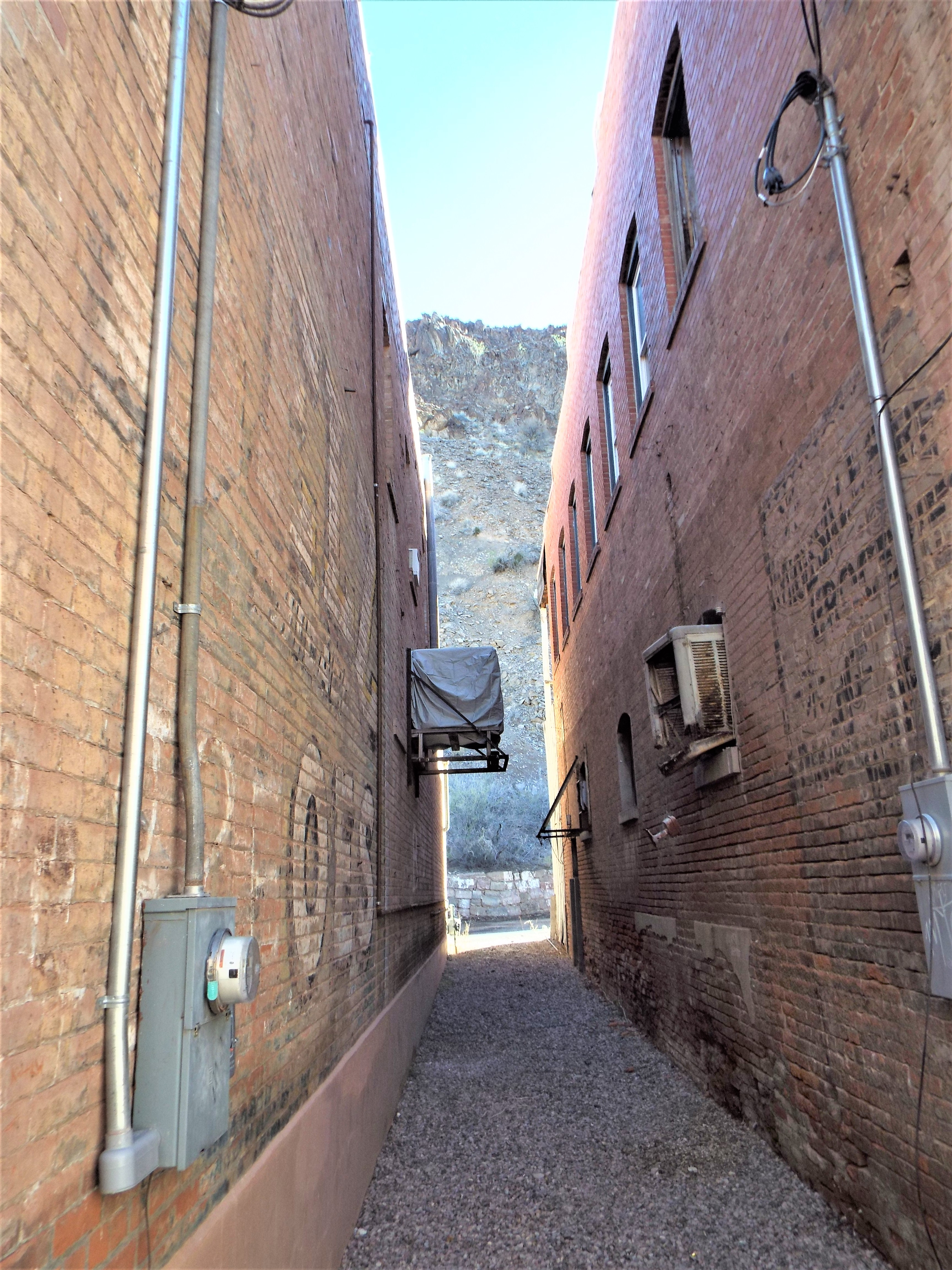
Alley between Chase Creek Street and Palacio Dr.

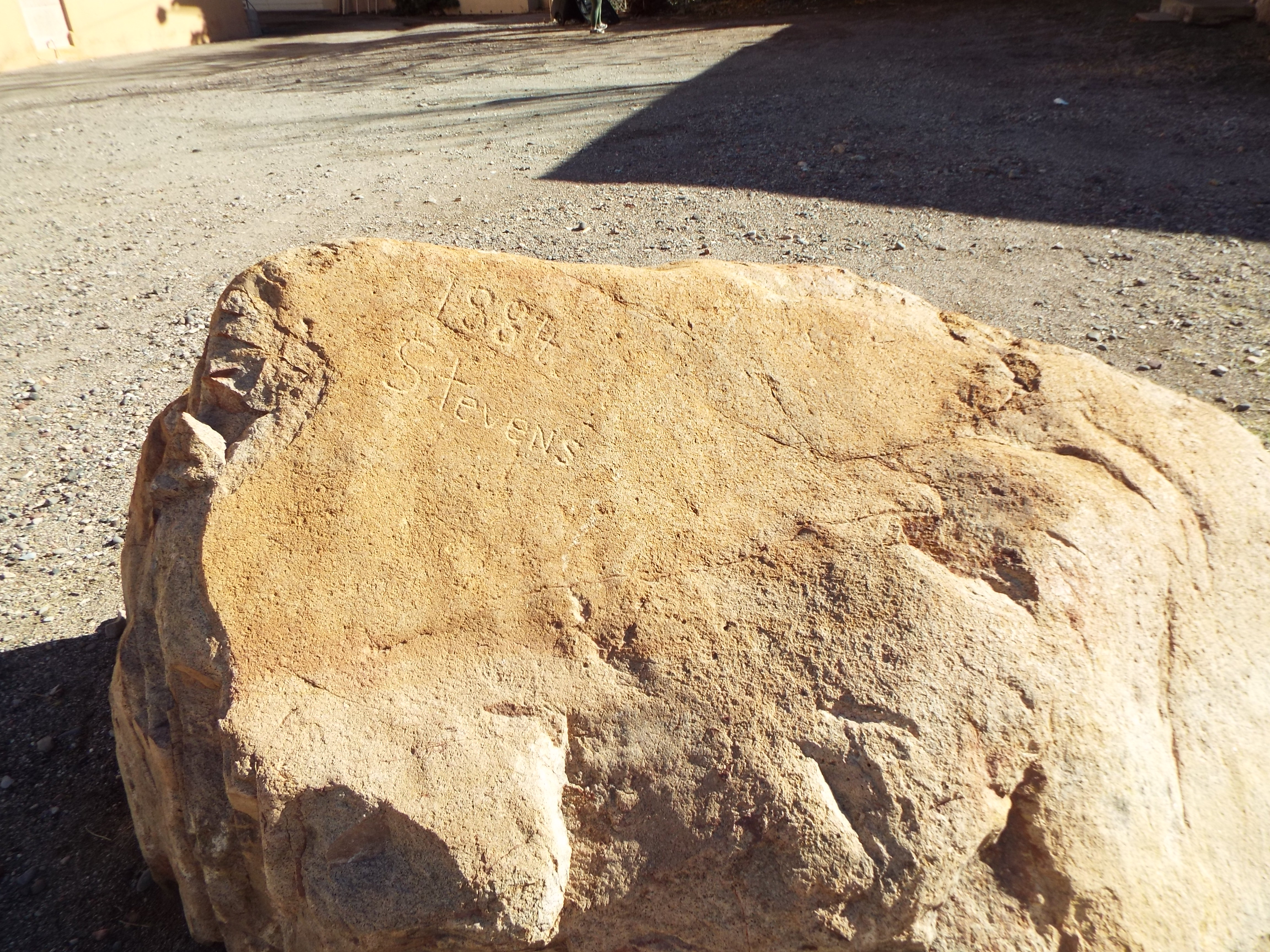
Stone where Ike Stevens, a friend of Mason Greenlee, chiseled "1884 Stevens"

The following historic business structures are listed as contributing factors within the Historic Chase Creek Street District The original name of the street was Copper Avenue. The names posted are the original names used when first built and address. The address in parentheses is the current new address. Included is the Palacio House located on the adjacent Palacio Loop.

- Granny's Attic – built in 1930 – 243 Chase Creek Street
- Restaurant/Shoe Repair – built in 1910 – 211 Chase Creek Street
- Woodmen of the World building – 1910 – 250 Chase Creek Street.
- Chase Creek Marketplace – built in 1890 – 215 (251) Chase Creek Street – It was originally the one-story Hoeye Barber Shop
- The Hollywood Shop – built in 1950 – (255) Chase Creek Street
- Zorrilla's Meat Market – built in 1893 – 221 (259) Chase Creek Street – This building was built by two brothers, Jesus and Manual (Lolo) Zorilla. The brothers established a meat market in the lower floor of the building.
- Billiard Hall/Brothel – built in 1893 – 225 (263) Chase Creek Street – This building now houses the Headframe Apothecary "
- La Feria – Rafael Valdz – built in 1906 – 229 (269) Chase Creek Street
- Saloon – built in 1913 – 235 (271) Chase Creek Street
- Jewelry Store – built in 1904 – (273) Chase Creek Street
- J.C. Penney Store – 251 – (275) Chase Creek Street
- Dry Goods Store/Farmer's Market – 253 (283) Chase Creek Street
- Gatti Meat Market Building – built in 1914 and located on 286 Chase Creek Street.
- The Cascarelli Building – built in 1913 – (295–297) Chase Creek Street – This building once belonged to Ippolito Cascarelli, an Italian immigrant. Before the fire of 1913, the Cascarelli building was Chase Creek's only three-story building.
- The Lyric Theater ruins – (299) Chase Creek Street – A century ago, the arches (pictured) are the remains of the façade of the Lyric Theater. The superstructures started to warp and sag, after 20 years of expansion and contraction, and eventually the roof caved in.
- ABC Market – (291) Chase Creek Street
- Eagle Hall-Greenlee Historical Museum Building – built in 1913 – 299 Chase Creek Street – built by the Spezia Brothers. The upper floor was originally used for meetings and for periodic dances. The upper floor was also used for offices of the city's police court, with justice of the peace Matt Danenhauer serving as judge. The lower floor was occupied by J. Alvarez's Meat Market.
- Villesca's House – built in 1918 321-325 Chase Creek Street – Romulo Villescas had an open-air vegetable market directly in front of the house.
- Zappia Bakery flour warehouse – the flour warehouse of Rocco Zappia's Bakery. Zappia made an apartment there so that he could rest after finishing his baking
- Picken-Anderson Overland Car Agency – 345 Chase Creek Street
- Antonio Spezia's Hay & Grain Store – built in 1913 – 325-327 Chase Creek Street
- Laundromat/Drug Store – built in 1913 – Chase Creek Street
- Sacred Heart Catholic Church – built in 1917 – 329 Chase Creek Street
- Claude Hooker House – built in 1896 – 389 Chase Creek Street. Claude Hooker who lived in this house was a Chase Creek attorney.
- Antonio Spezia House – built in 1918 – 399 Chase Creek Street. This house belonged to Antonio Spezia. Antonio (1865–1940) and his partner Ambrose (Buffo) Spezia were the most prominent entrepreneurs of Chase Creek.
- Ambrose Spezia's "Cave Bar" – built in 1911 – 527 Chase Creek Street. it was originally a whiskey warehouse for the Old Buffet Saloon, but later, after the end of Prohibition in 1933, it was opened as a bar.
- Doctor Harle's Office/Mexican Consulate – built in 1918 – 312 Chase Creek Street. In 1903 Dr. Harle was arrested for murder. Harle served 10 years of a 20-year sentence, and was eventually freed by Pancho Villa after his occupation of Chihuahua City and served in the rebel army as Villa's personal physician during his campaigns. Harle returned to the US and opened his office in this building.
- Clifton Social Club – built in 1913 – 270 Chase Creek Street. This building originally served as the Gabadon dry goods store
- Clifton Union Hall – built in 1916 – 289 Chase Creek Street. It is one of the few documented places where Cesar Chavez is known to have spoken on behalf of a union other than this own.
- Drug Store/Law Office – built in 1913 – (280–292) Chase Creek Street.
- Old Buffet Bar – built in 1897 – 270 Chase Creek Street. this building was a saloon, adjacent to the passage that once led to a bridge over Chase Creek to the smelter.
- Greenlee Restaurant – built in 1907 – (266–268) Chase Creek Street. Originally this building housed a tailor and barber shop and later the Greenlee Restaurant.
- Jim Sing's Chop House – built in 1907 – 234 Chase Creek Street
- Storefront and living quarters – built in 1906 on Chase Creek Street.
- Freddy Fritz Youth Park – established in 1984 – Chase Creek Street.
- Clifton Cliff Jail – built in 1881 – Clifton Cliff Jail was blasted from solid rock and built into the side of the cliff in 1881. The first inmate in it was Margarito Verala, the miner who built the jail. After he was paid for building the jail, Verala went to a saloon in town where he had some drinks and became drunk. As a result, he started shooting his gun wildly and ended up in the jail.
- Palacio House – built in 1917 – 300 Palacio Loop – Fermin Palicio was hired by the Arizona Copper Company in Spain because he was a trained blacksmith and graduate of a technical school. The garages of the Palicio House are the former classrooms of Clifton's third Catholic Church, destroyed in a flood.
Historic Chase Creek Street buildings

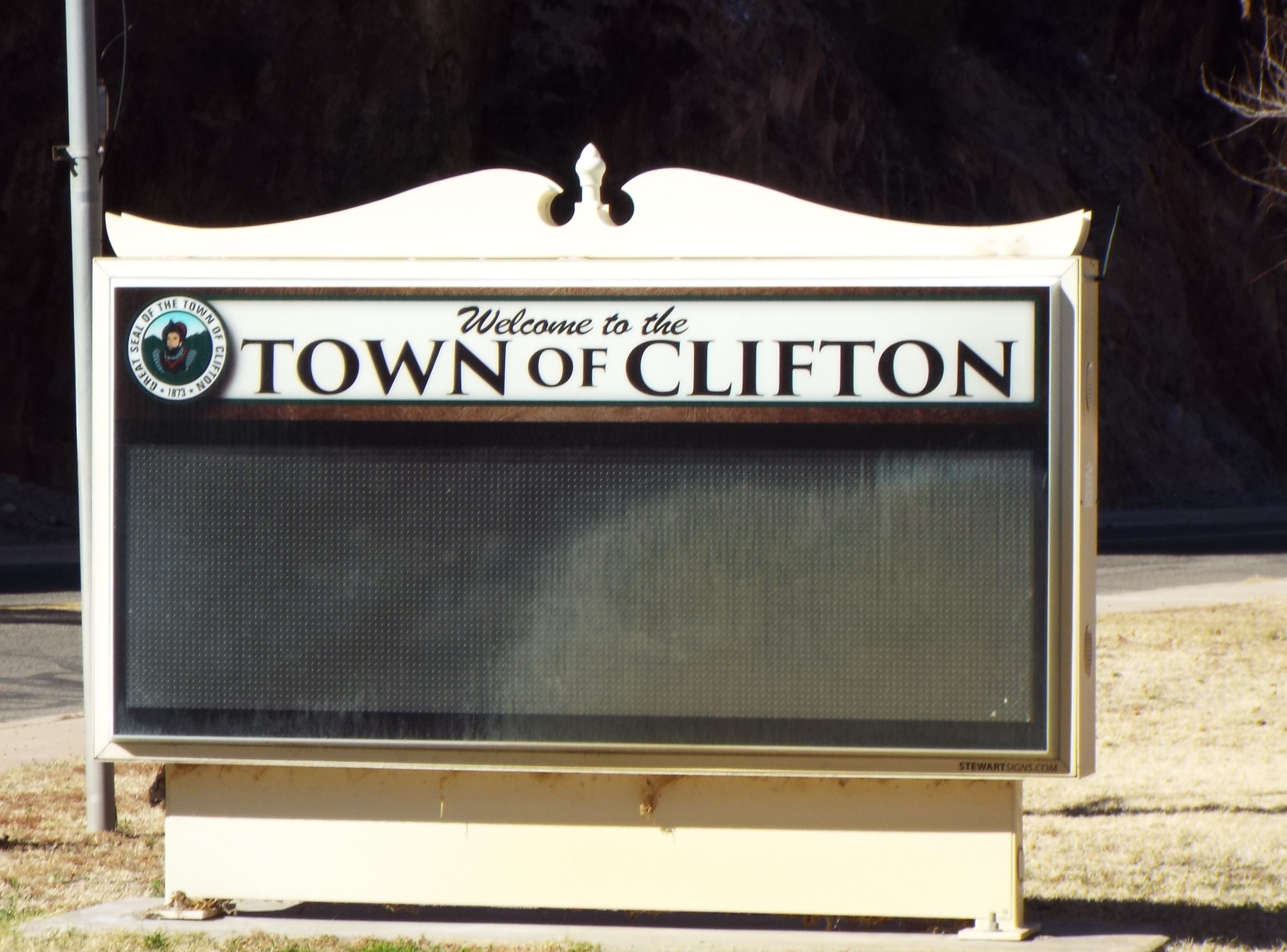
Welcome to Clifton, Arizona –

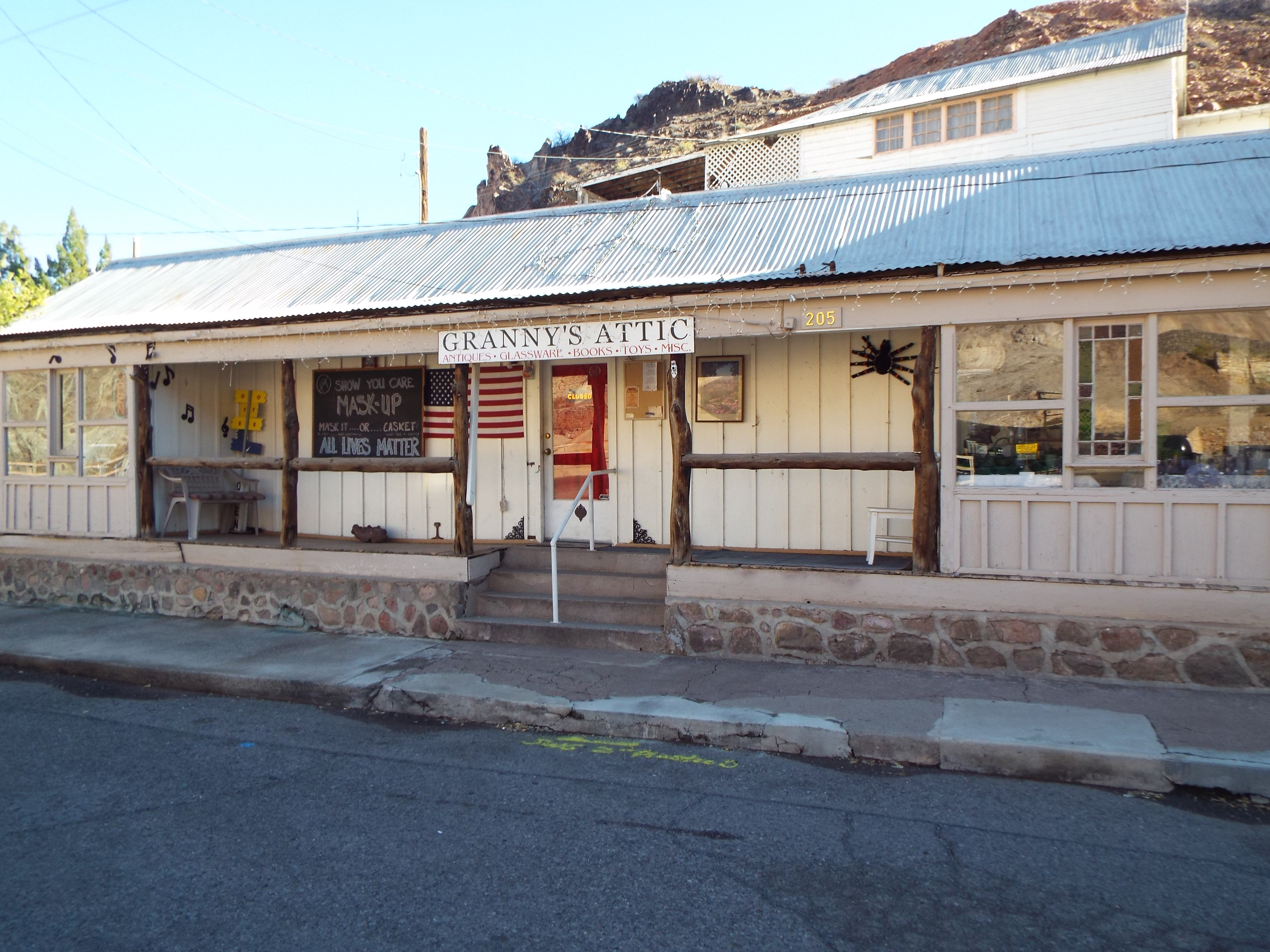
Granny's Attic – 1930

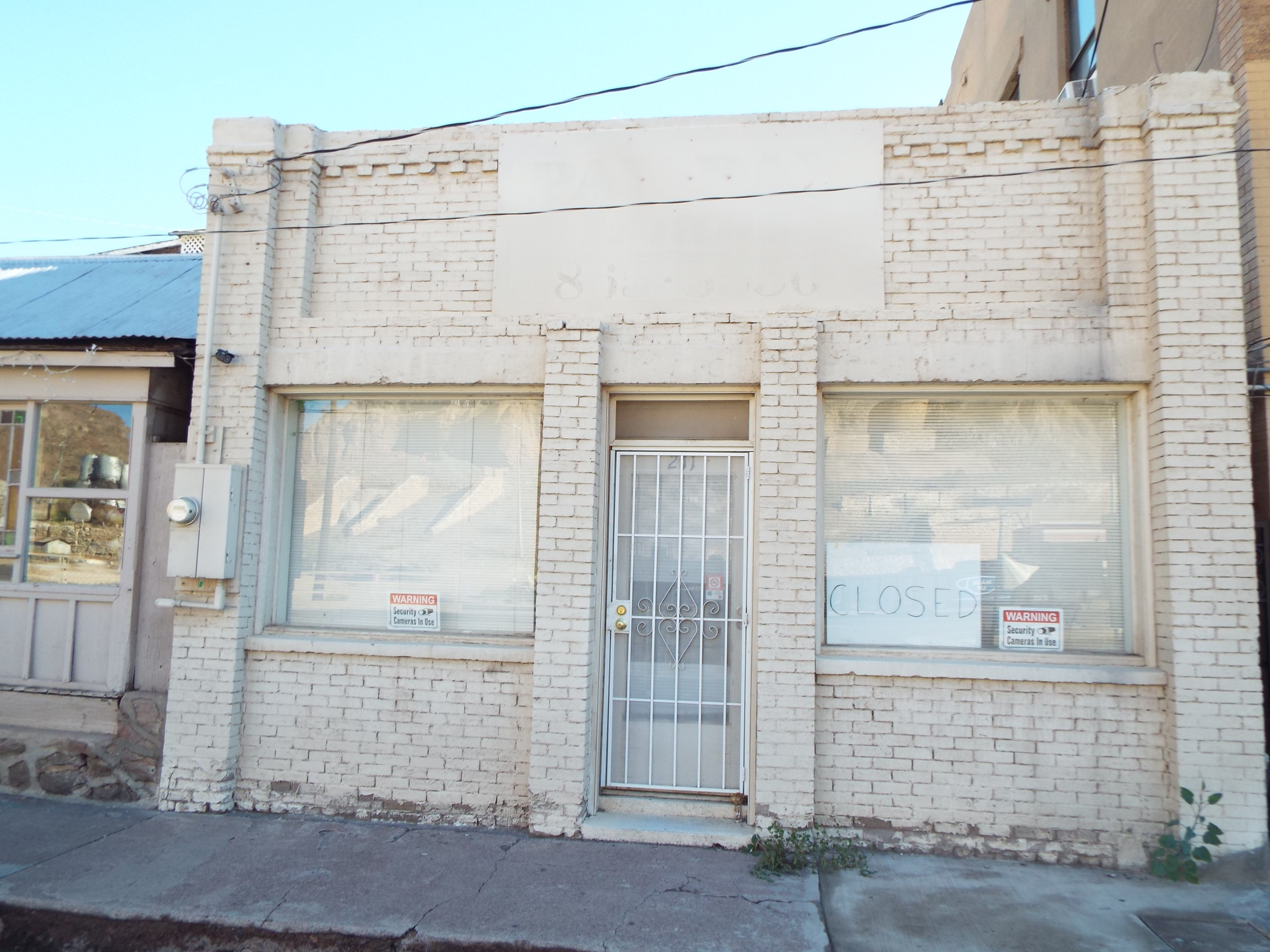
Restaurant/Shoe Repair – 1910

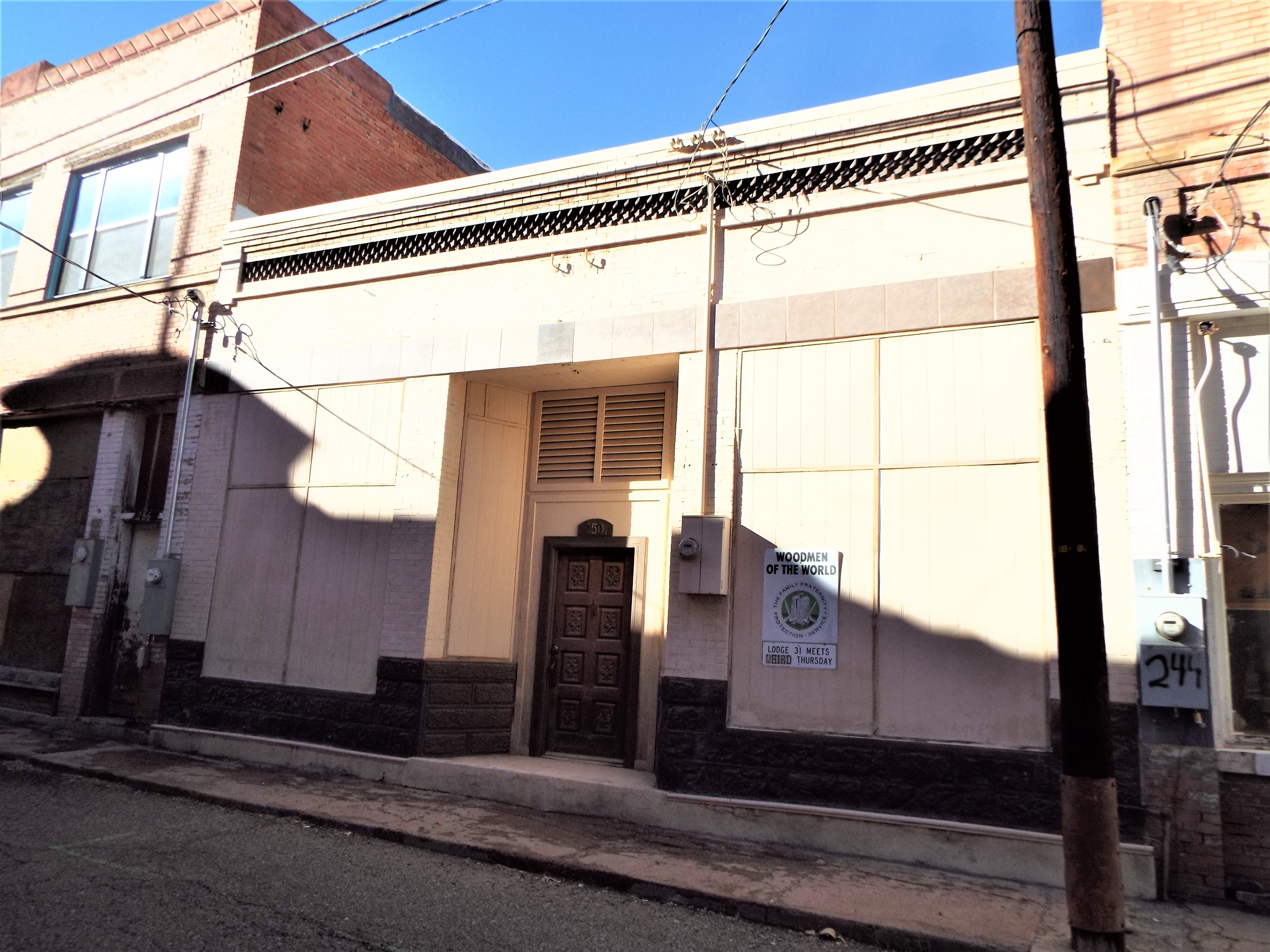
Woodmen of the World building – 1910

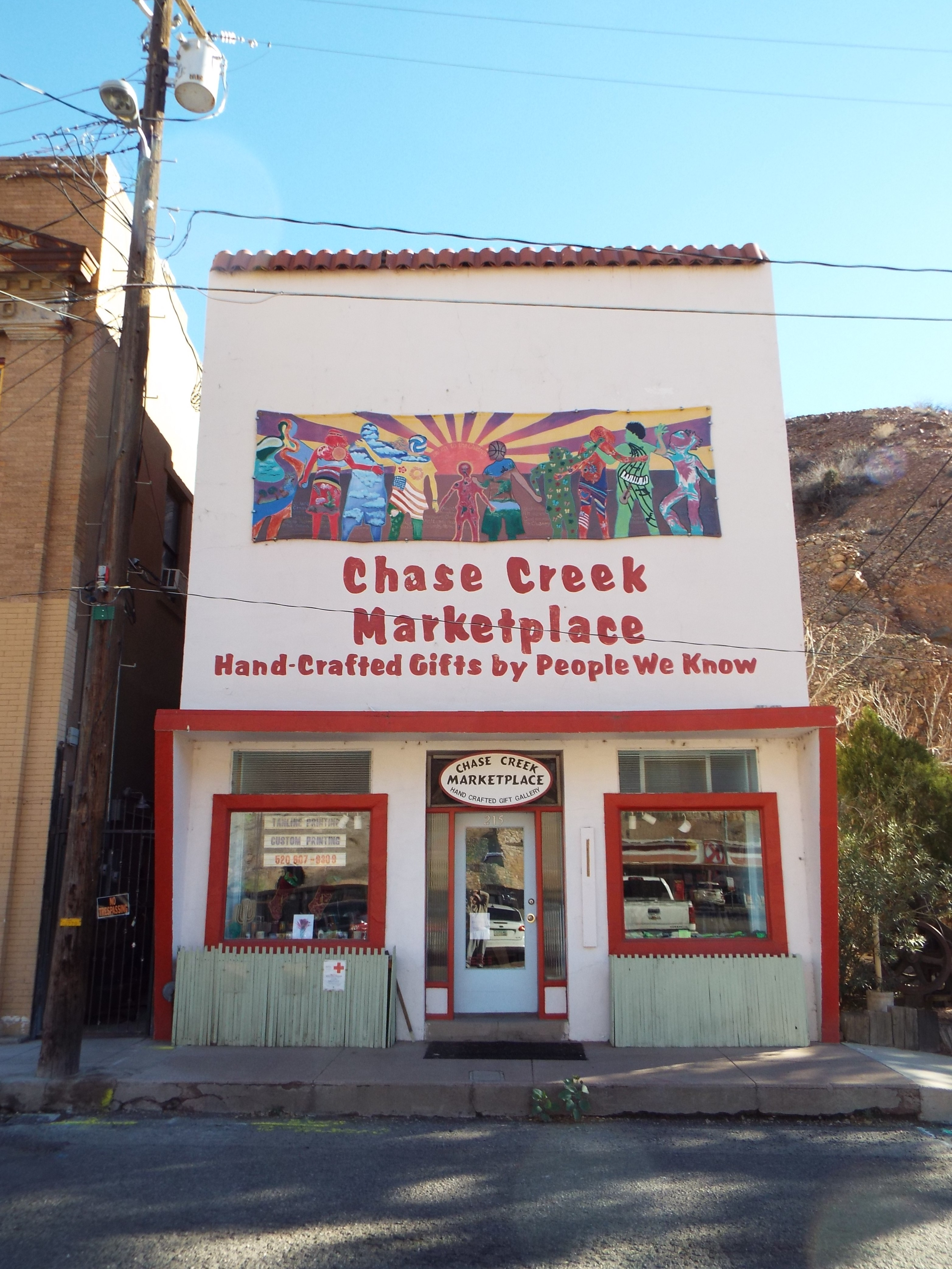
Chase Creek Marketplace – 1890

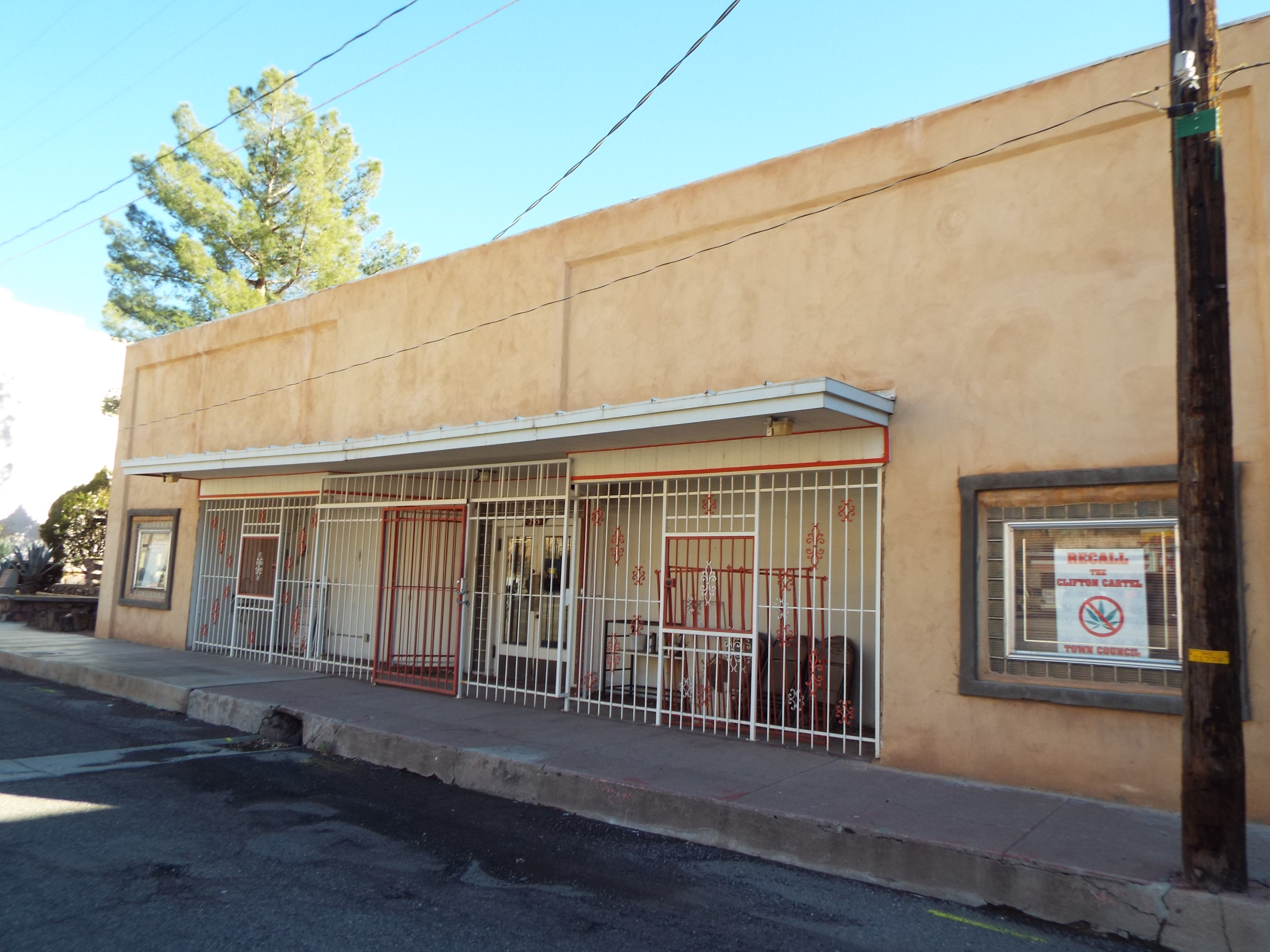
The Hollywood Shop – 1950

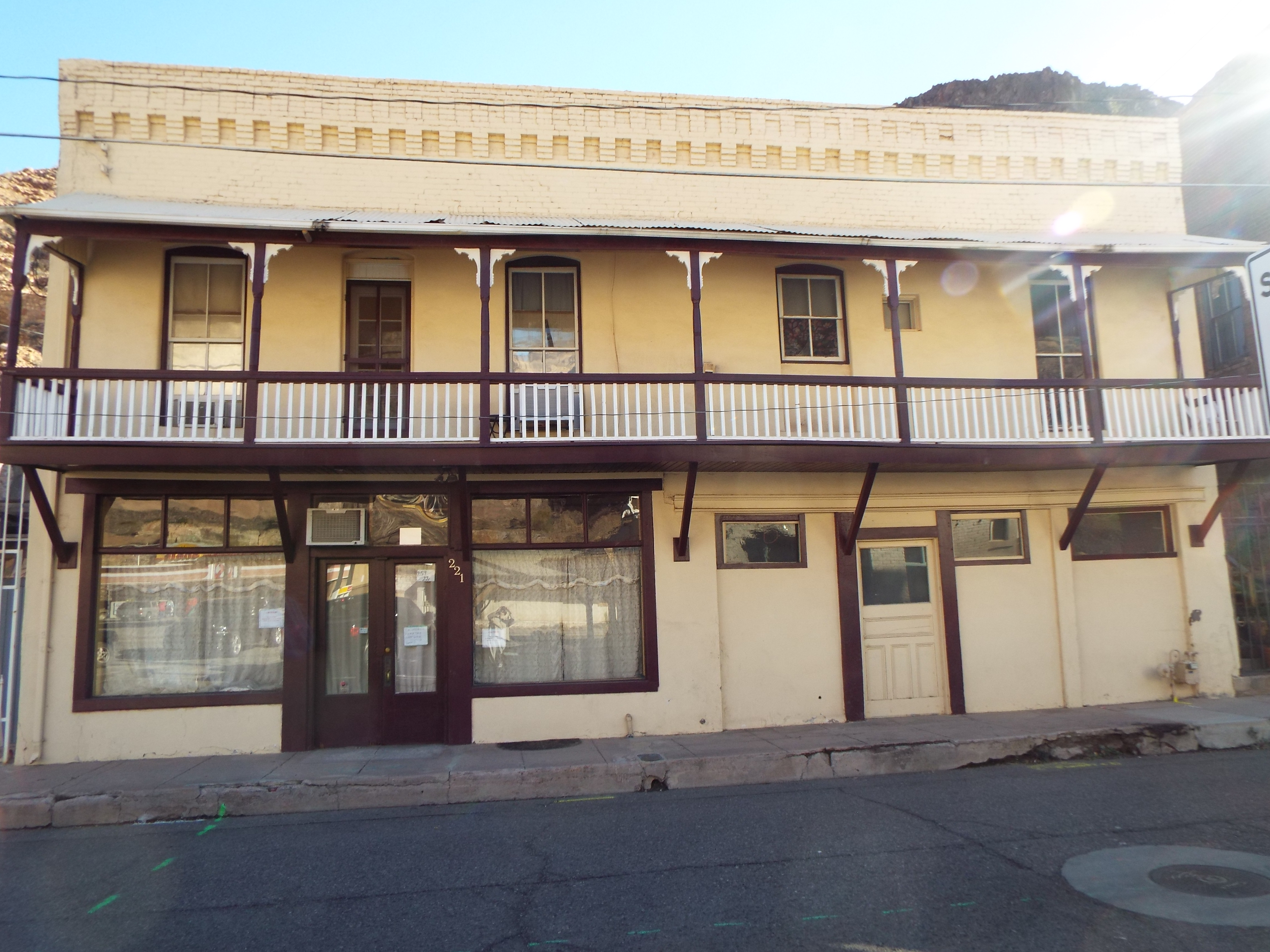
Zorrilla's Meat Market – 1893

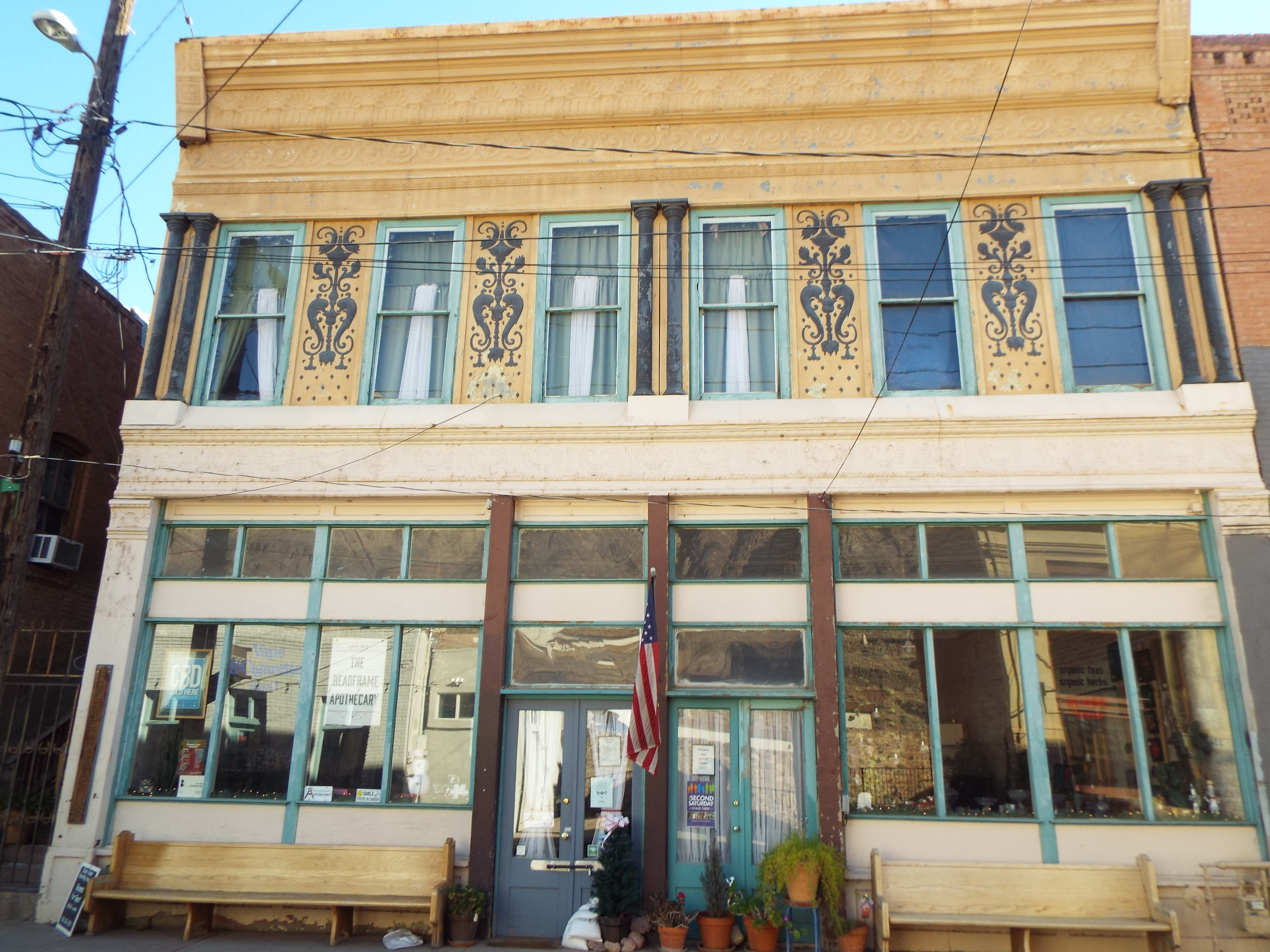
Billard Hall/Brothel – 1893

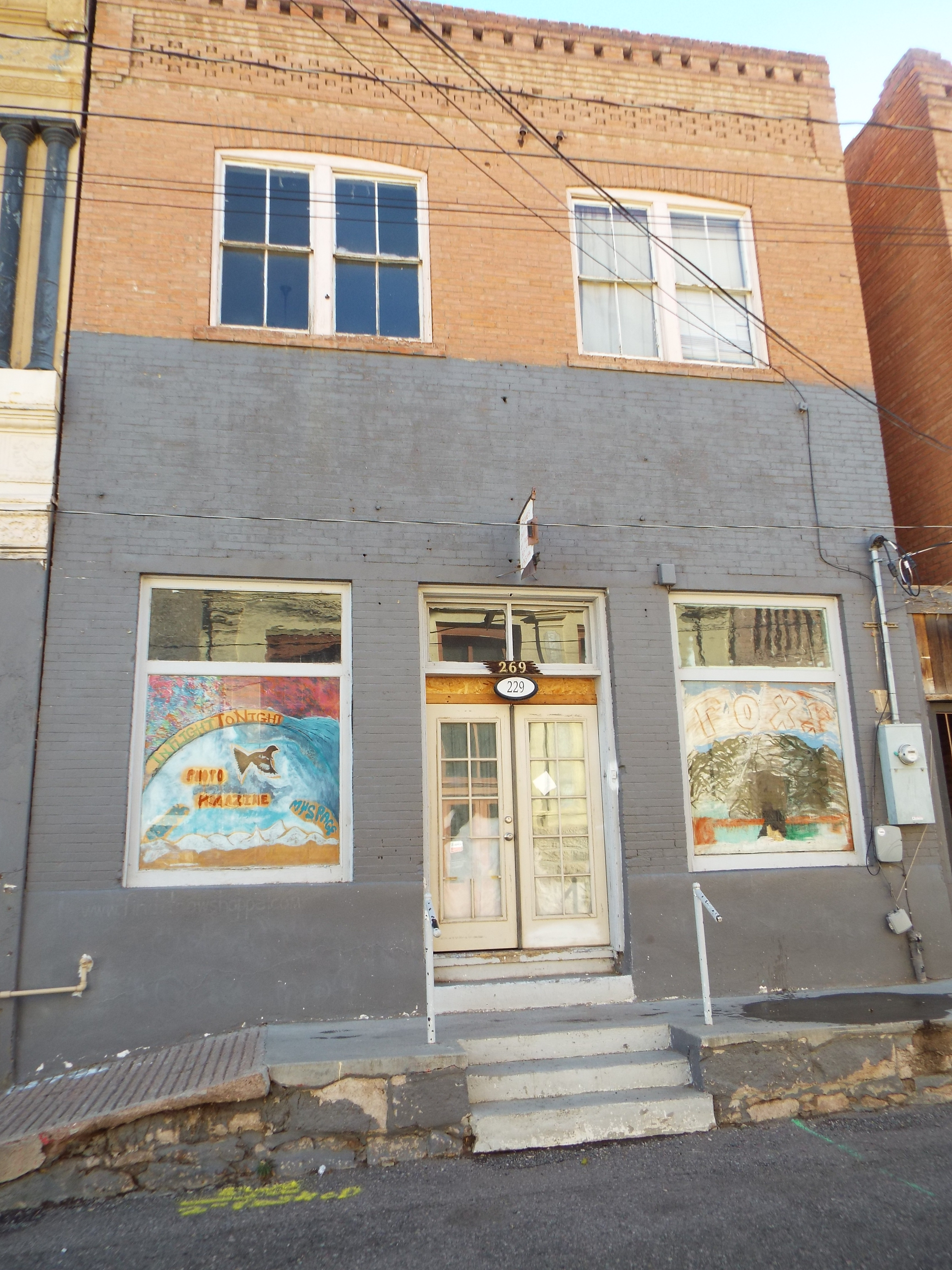
La Feria – Rafael Valdz – 1906

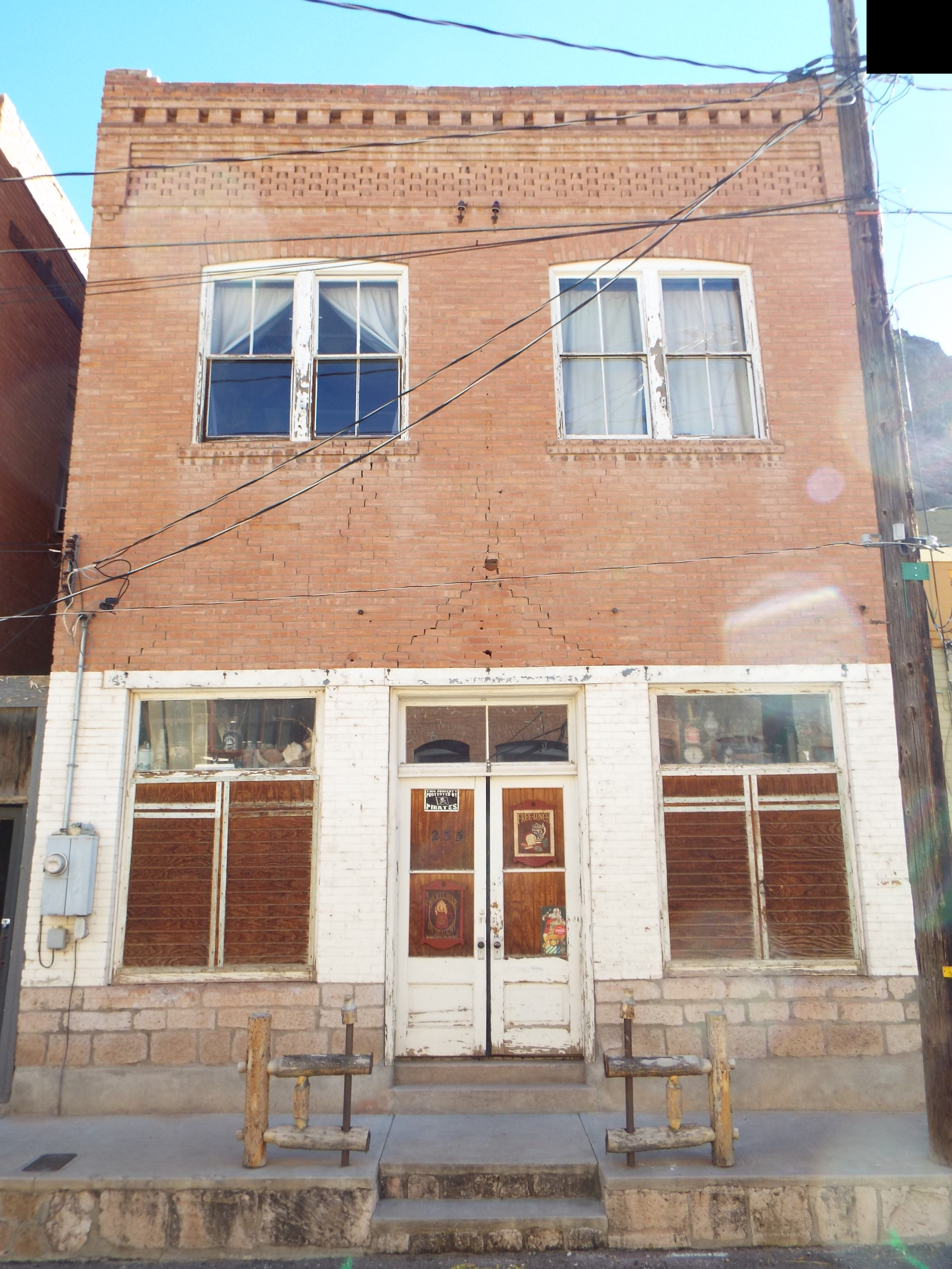
Saloon – 1913

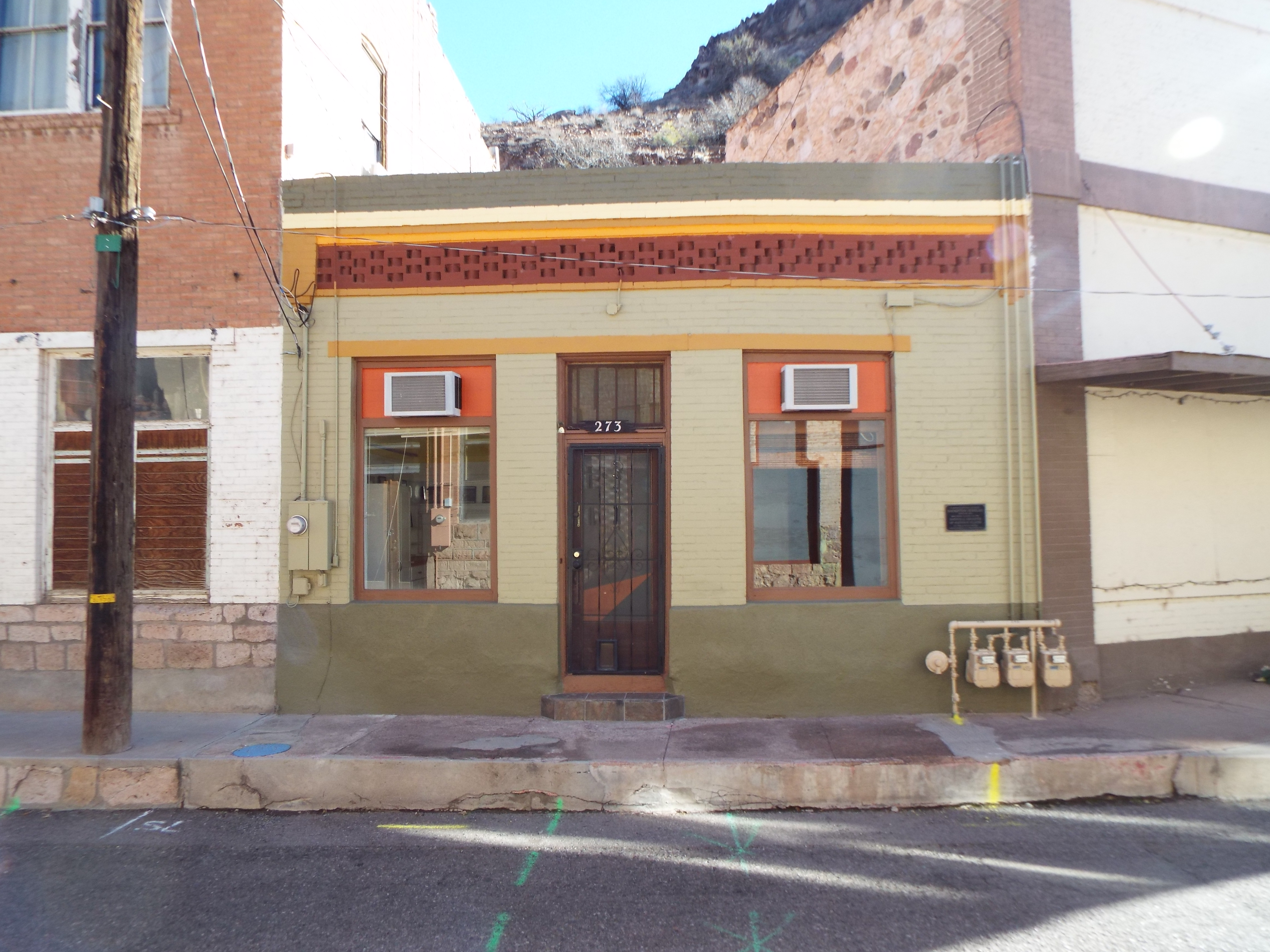
Jewelry Store – 1904

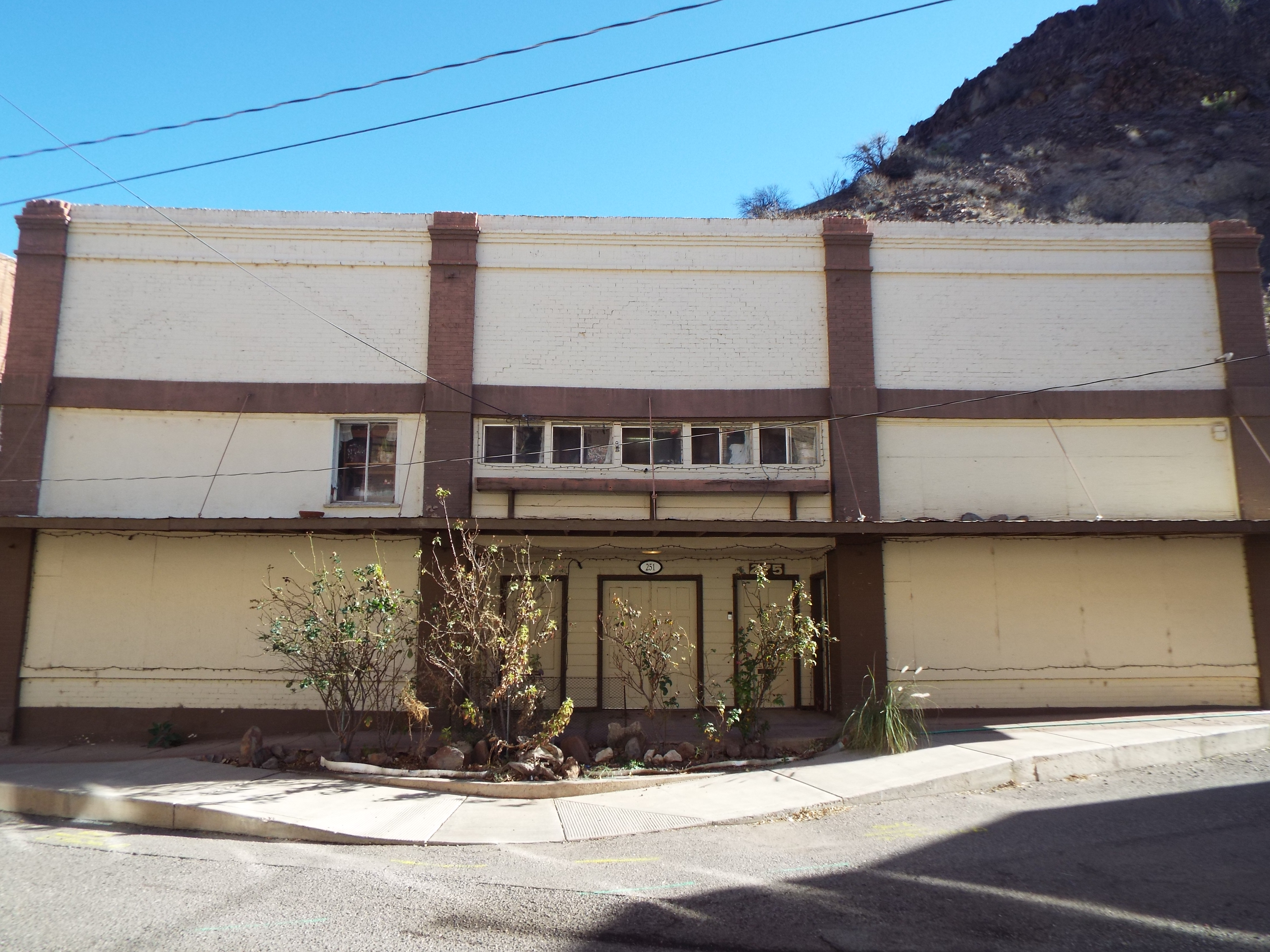
J.C. Penney Store

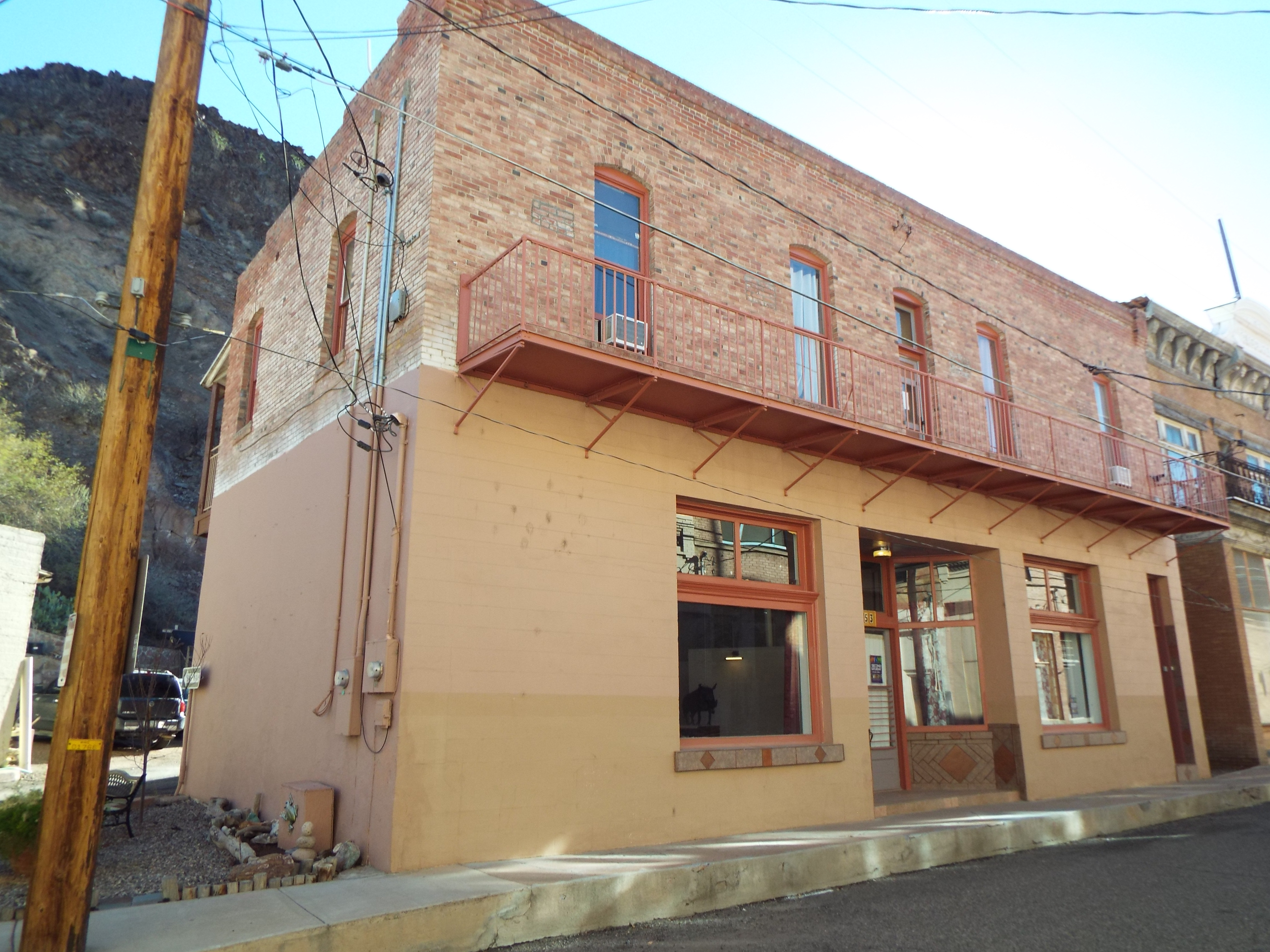
Dry Goods Store/Farmer's Market

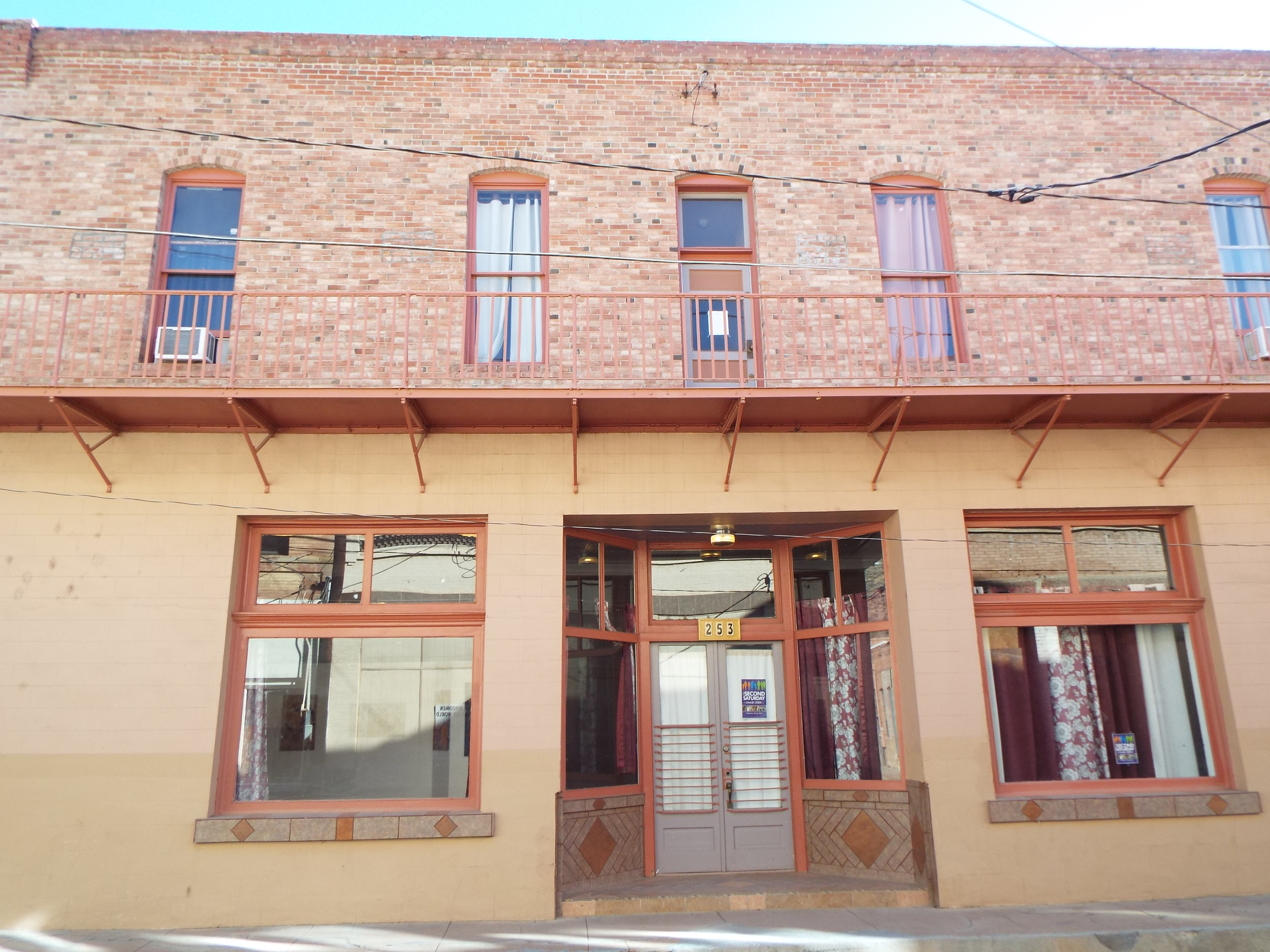
Front view of the Dry Goods Store/Farmer's Market

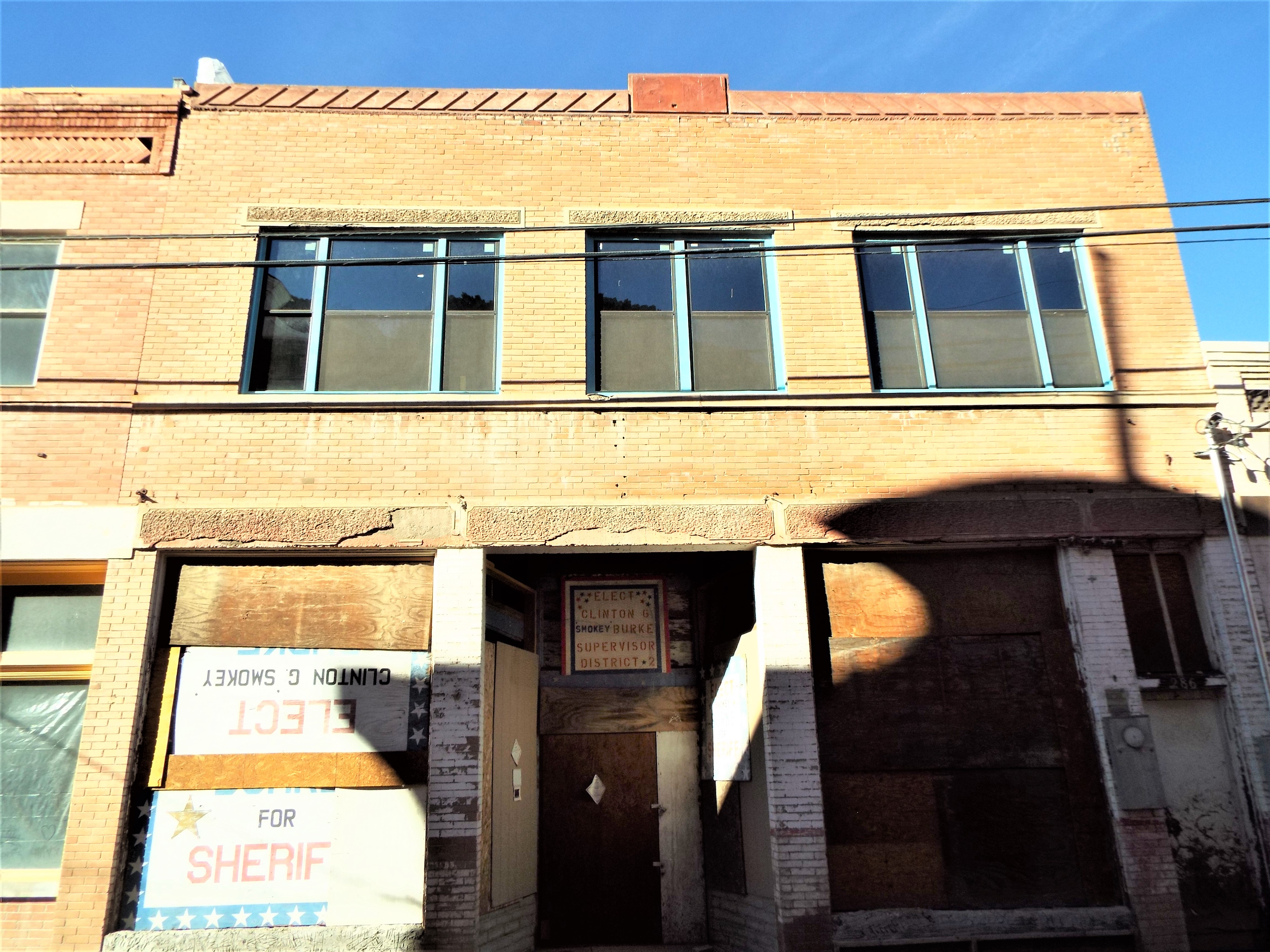
Gatti Meat Market – 1914

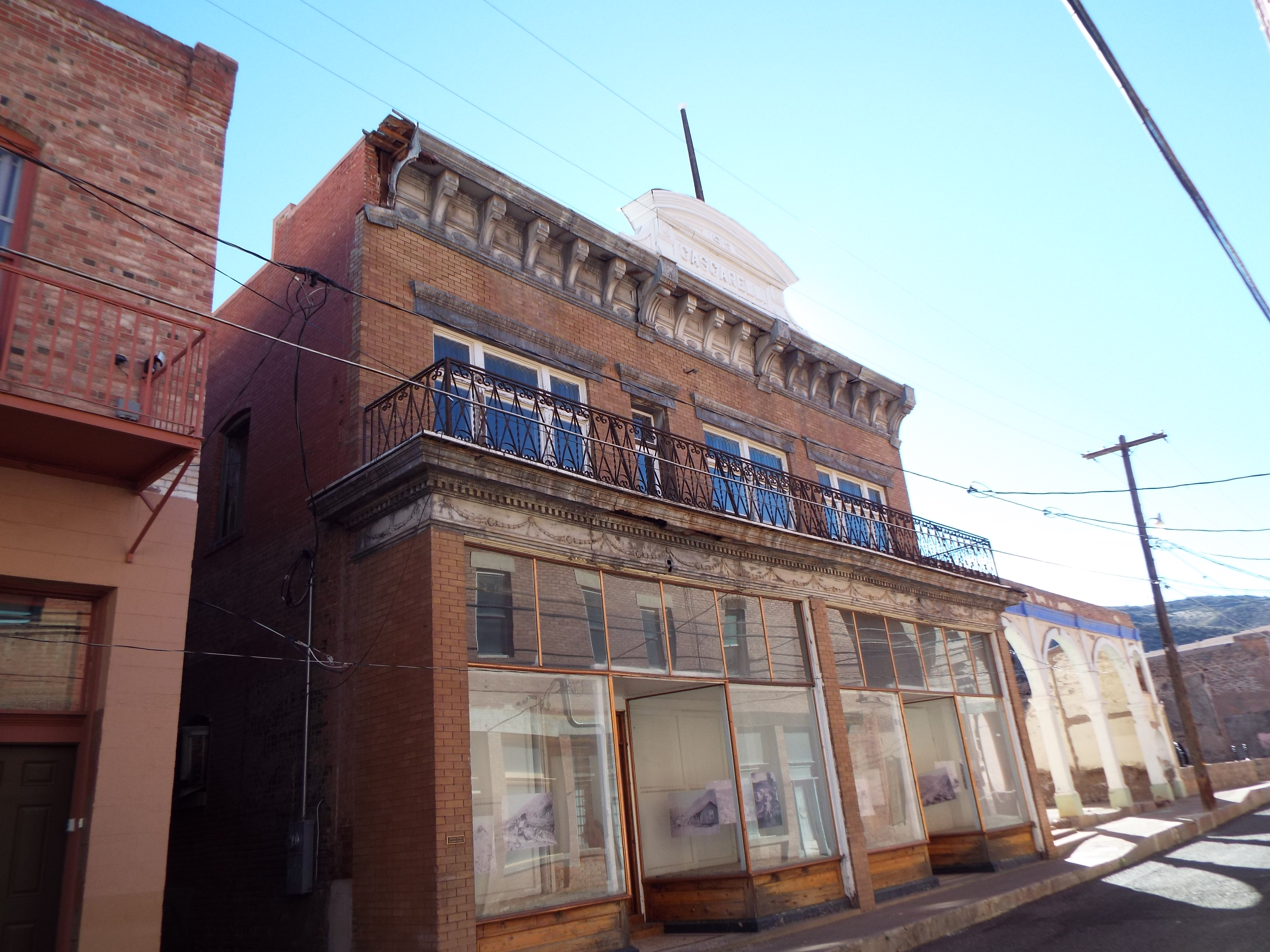
Cascarelli Building – 1913

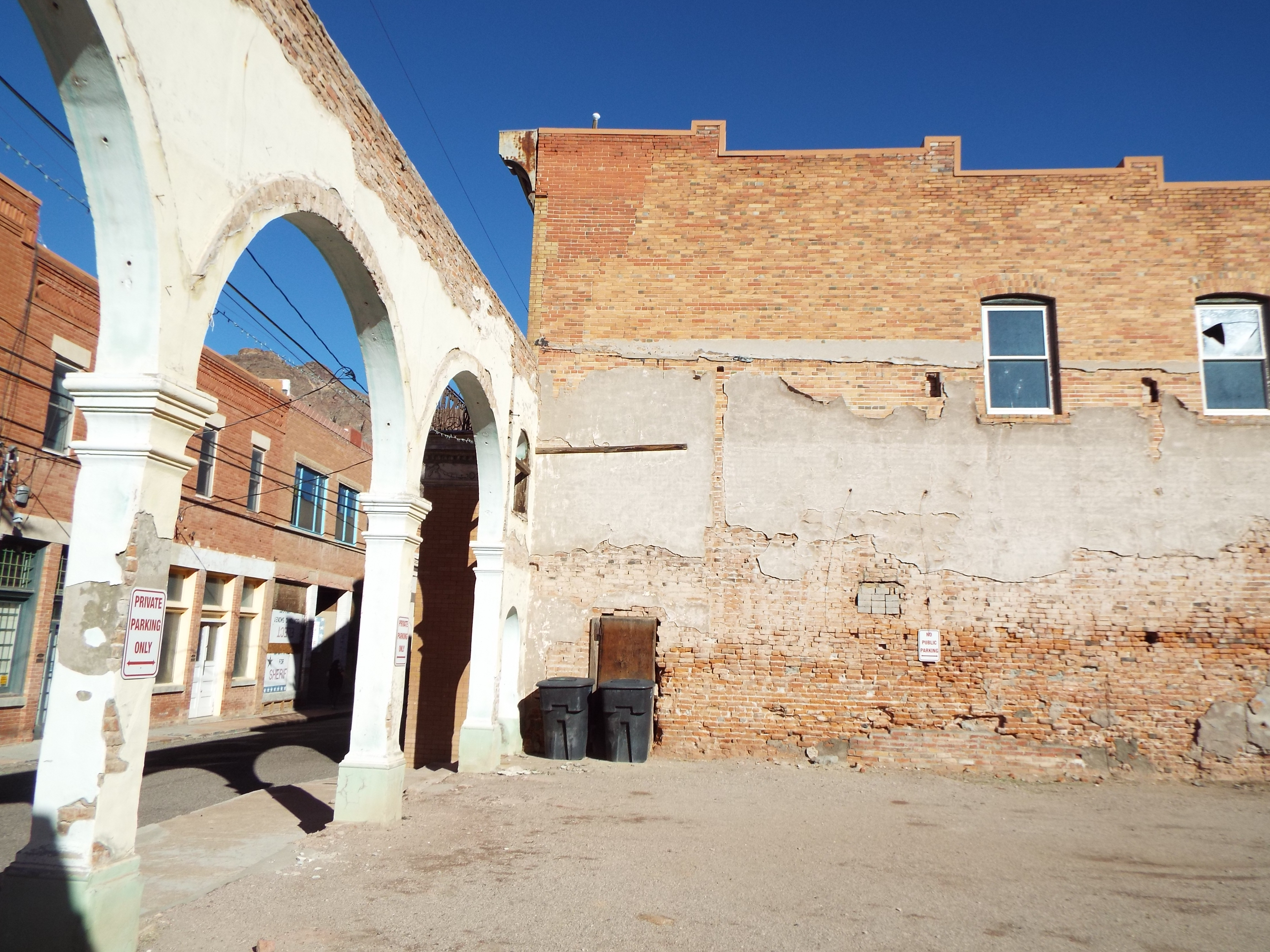
Lyric Theater ruins

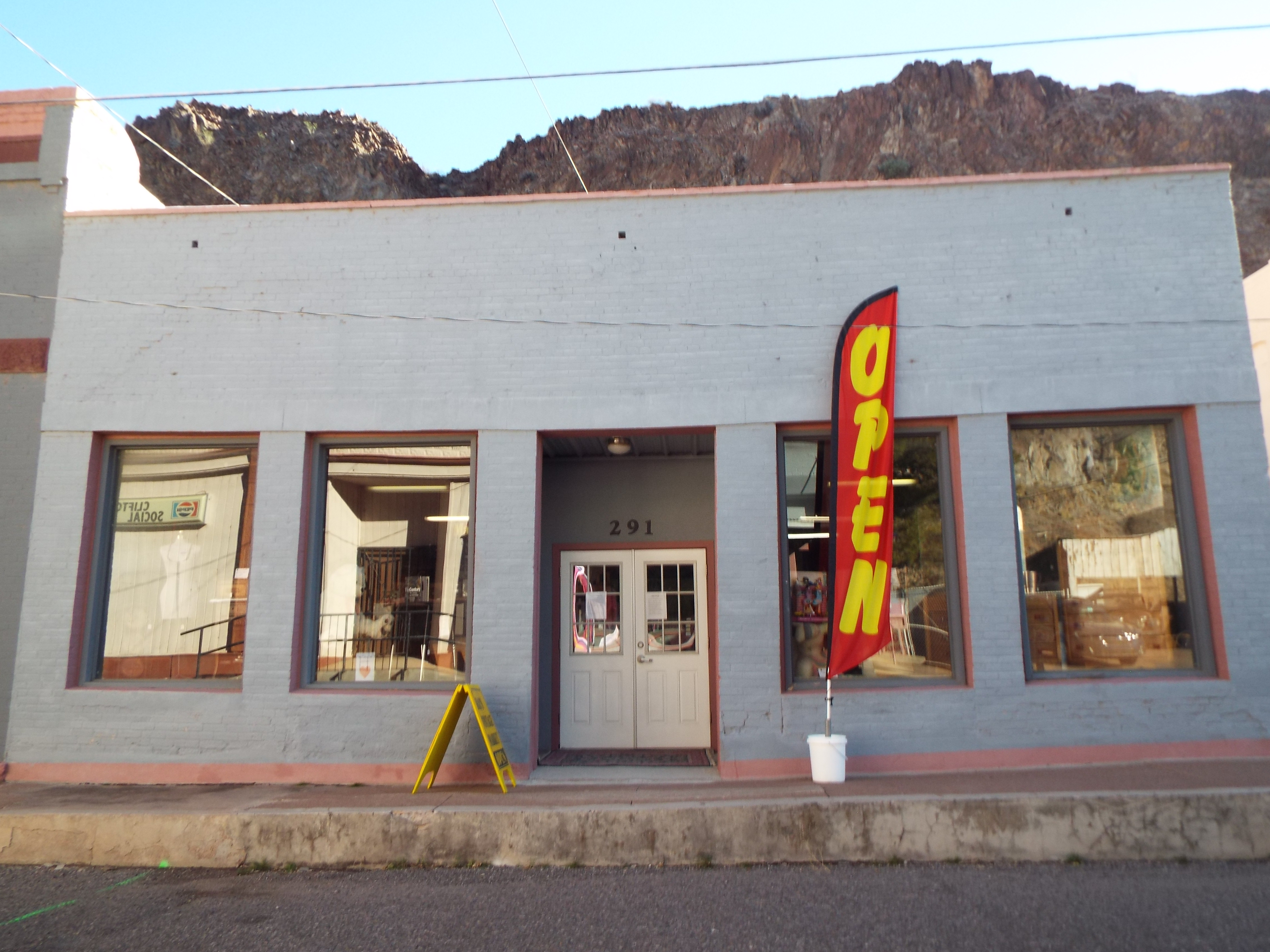
ABC Market

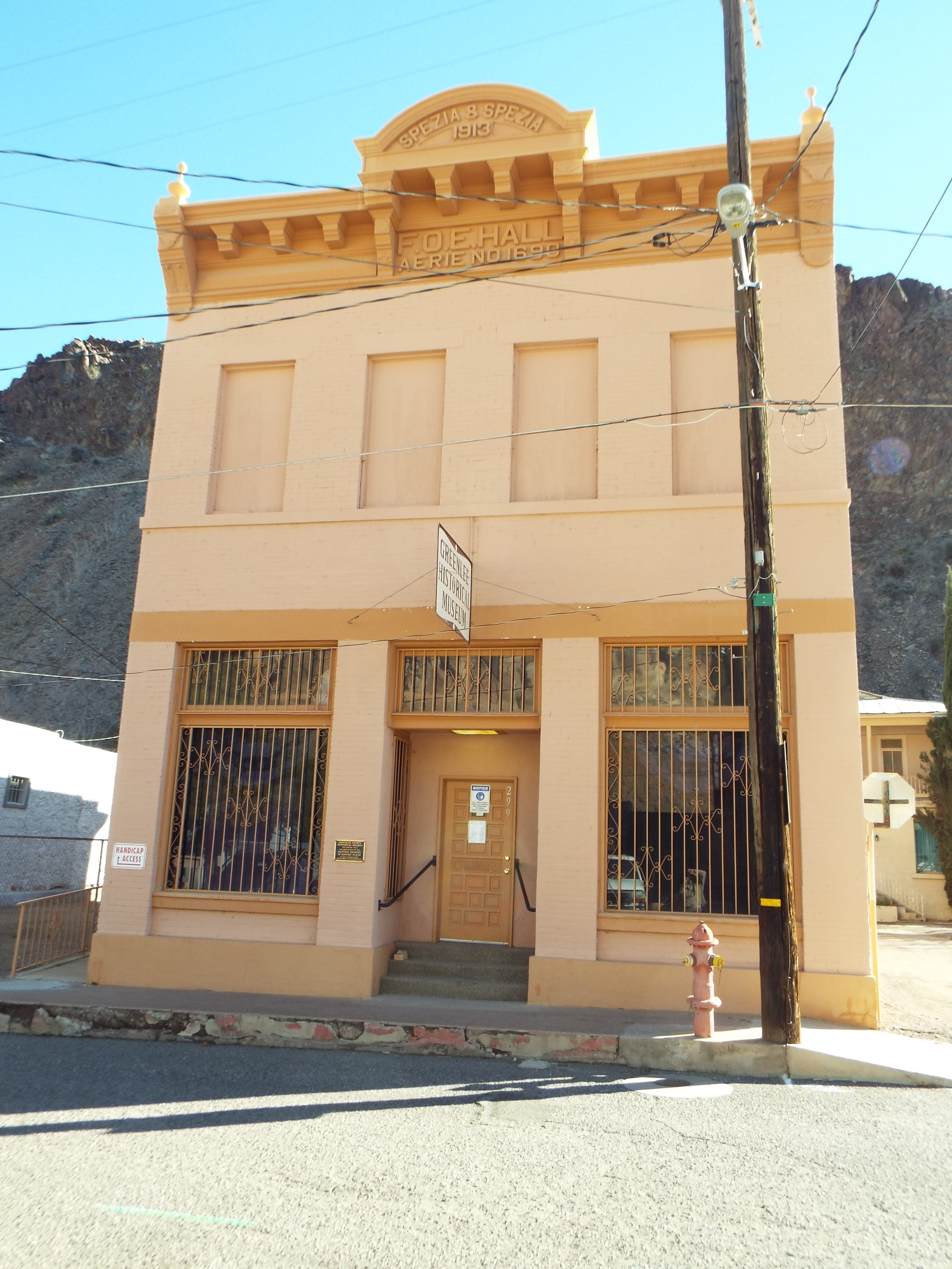
Eagle Hall-Greenlee Historical Museum Building – 1913

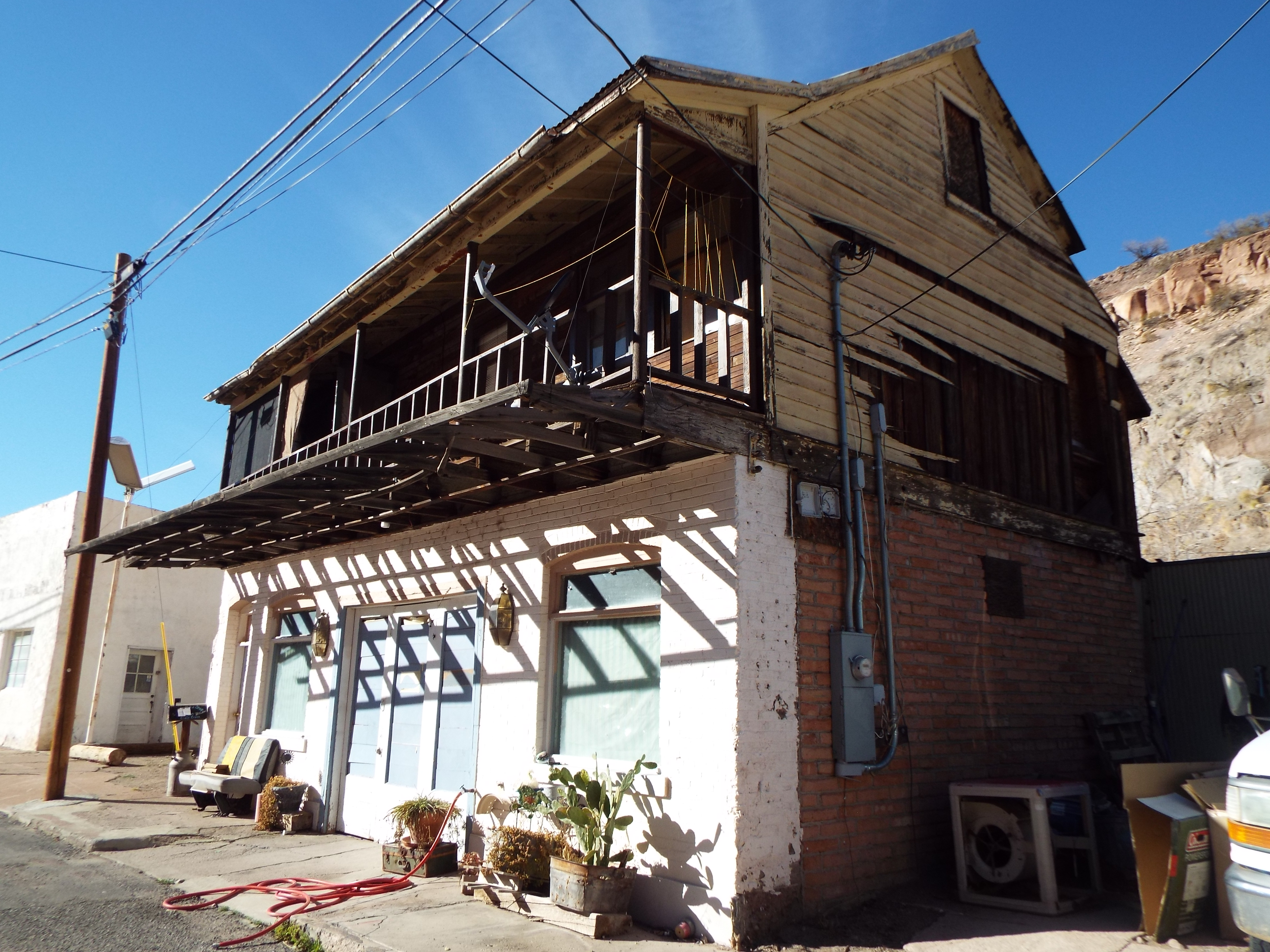
Villesca's House – 1918

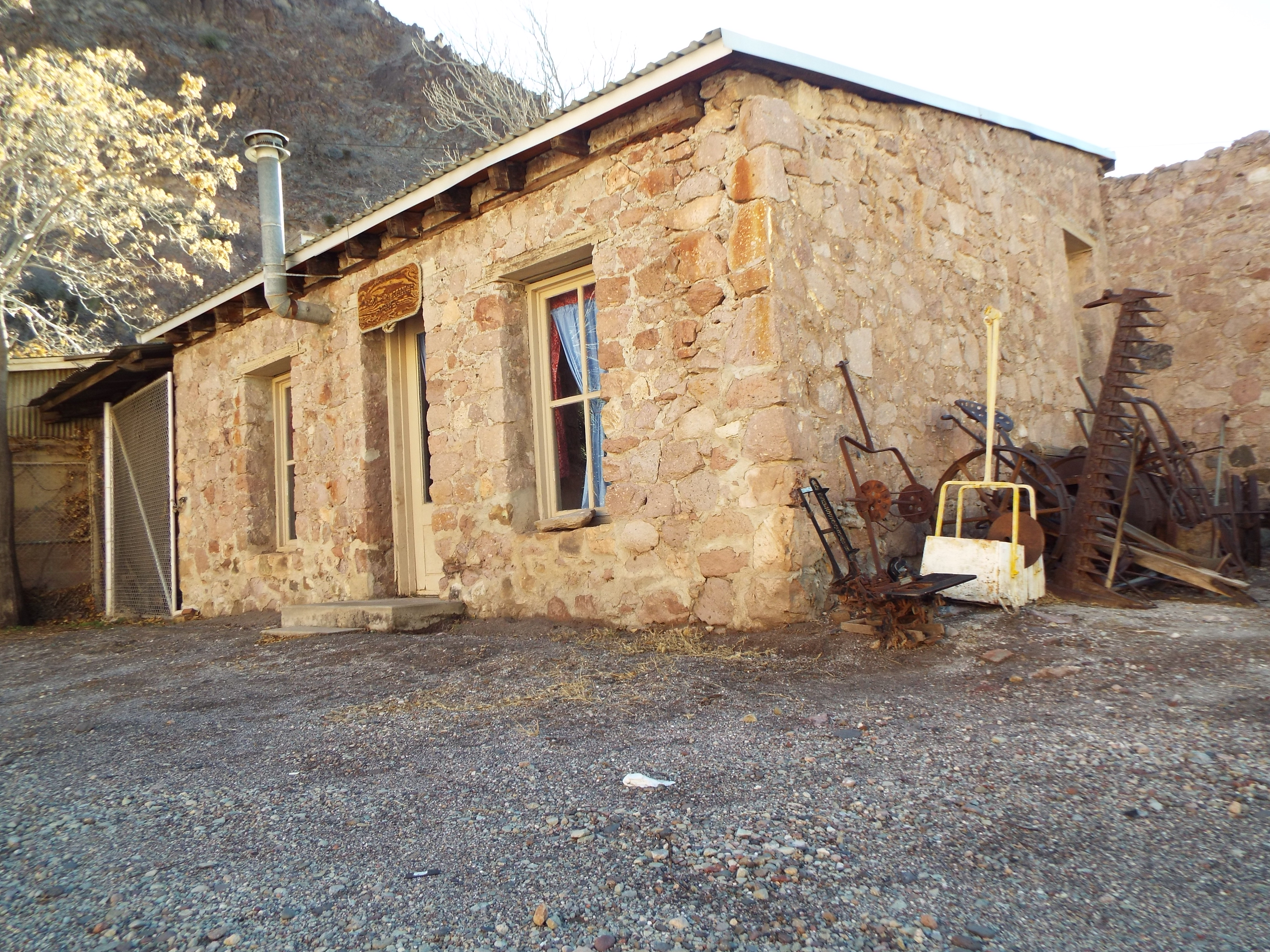
Zappia Bakery flour warehouse

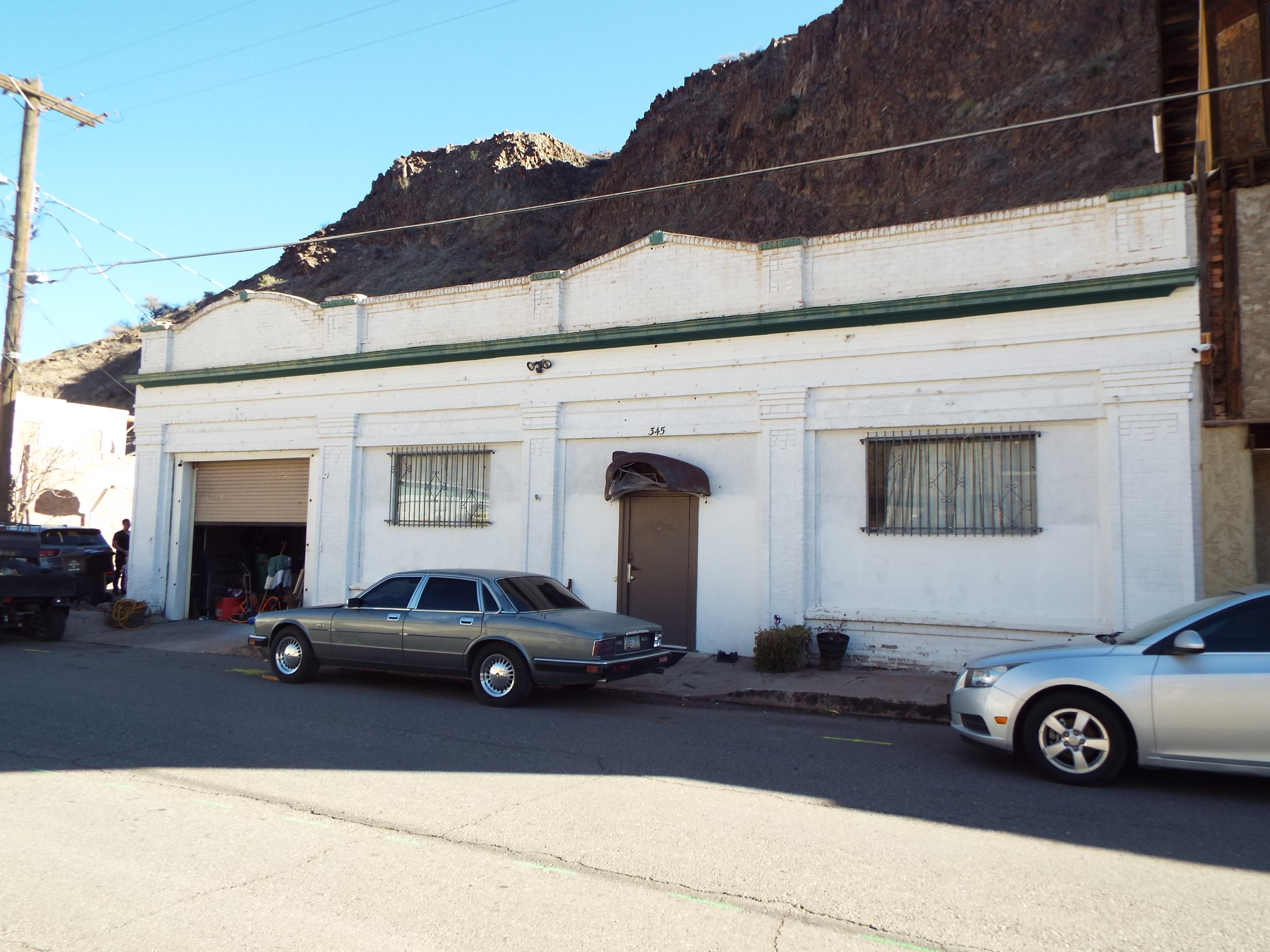
Picken-Anderson Overland Car Agency

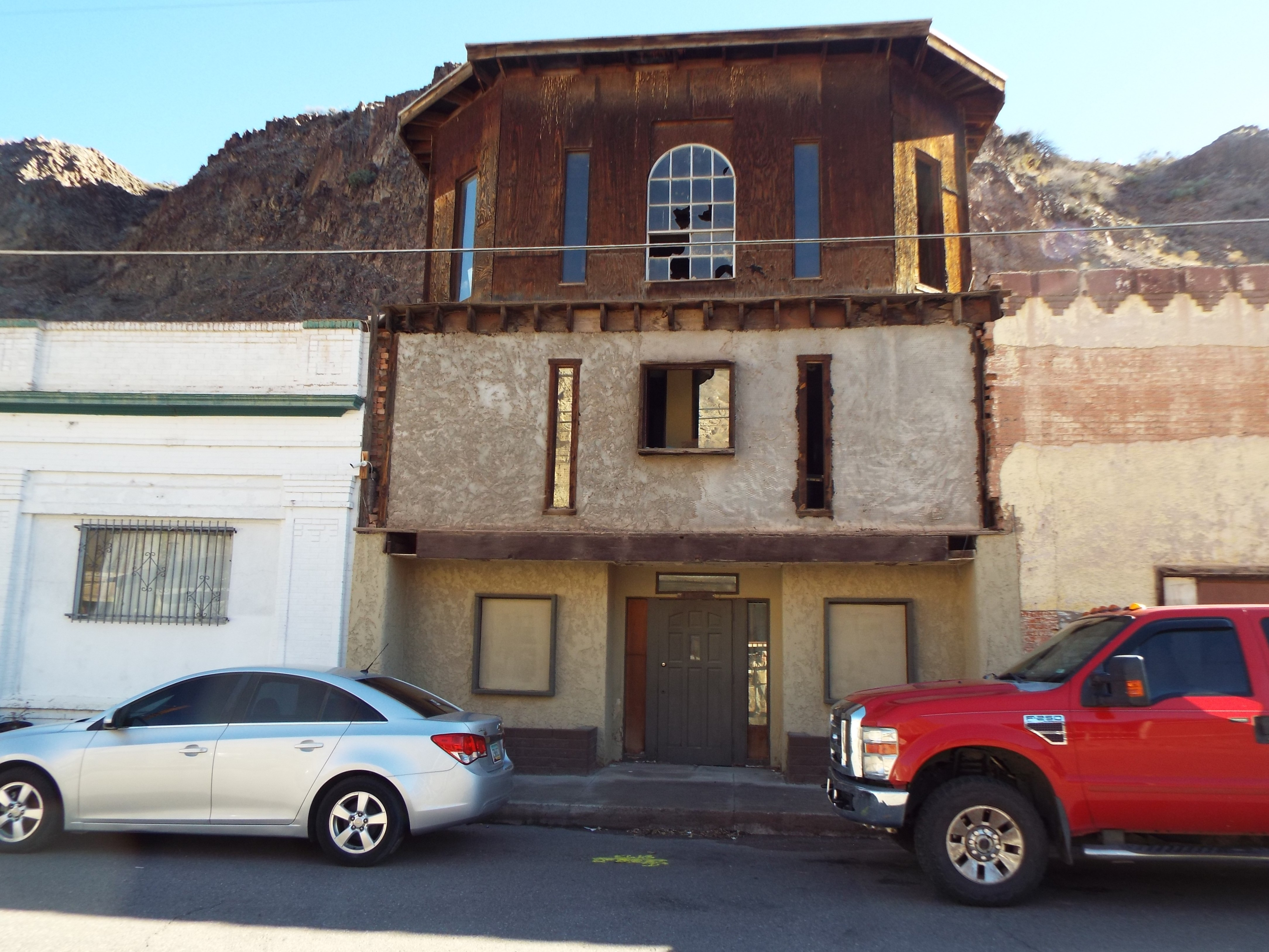
Antonio Spezia's Hay & Grain Store – 1913

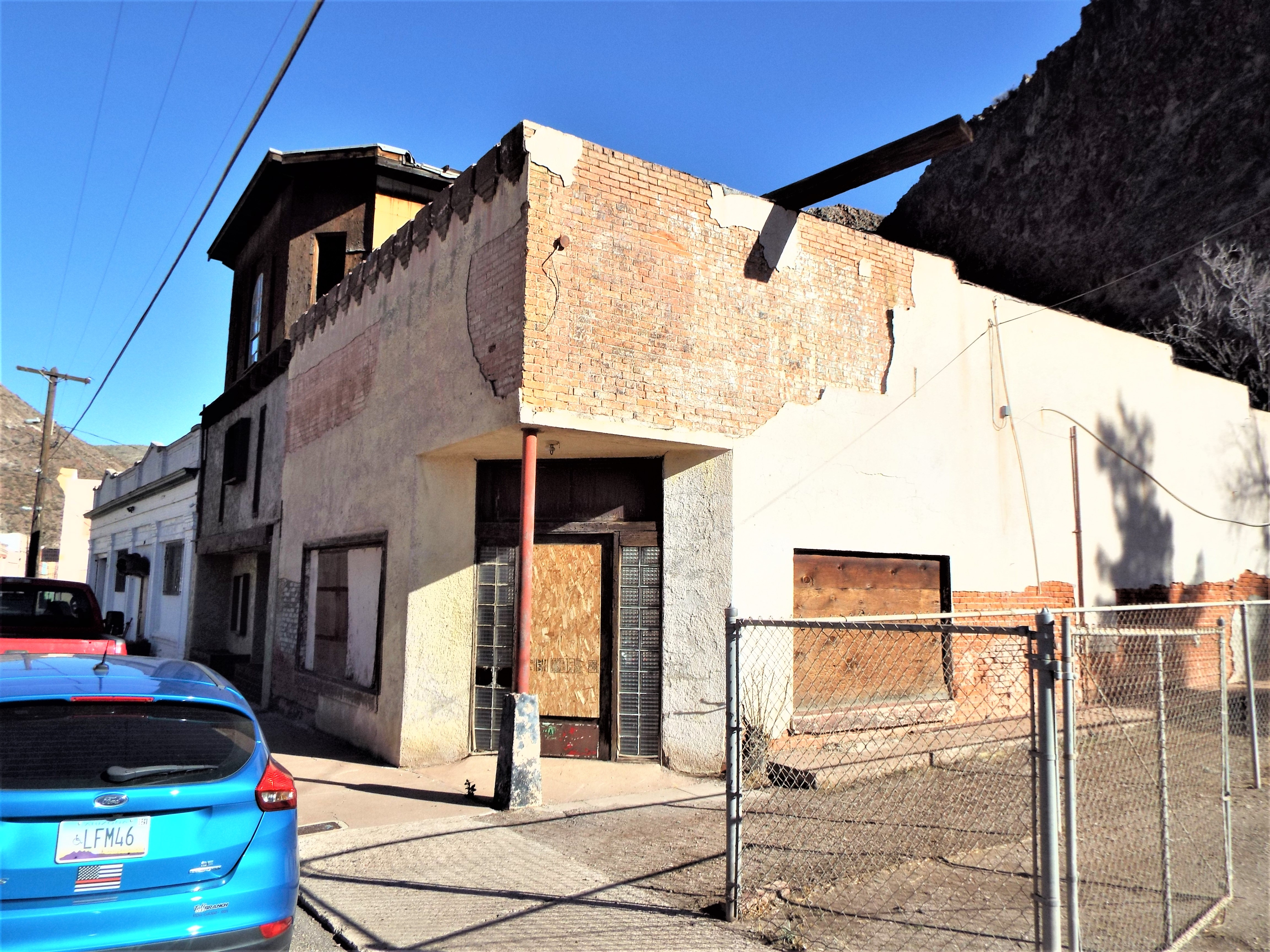
Laundromat/Drug Store – 1913

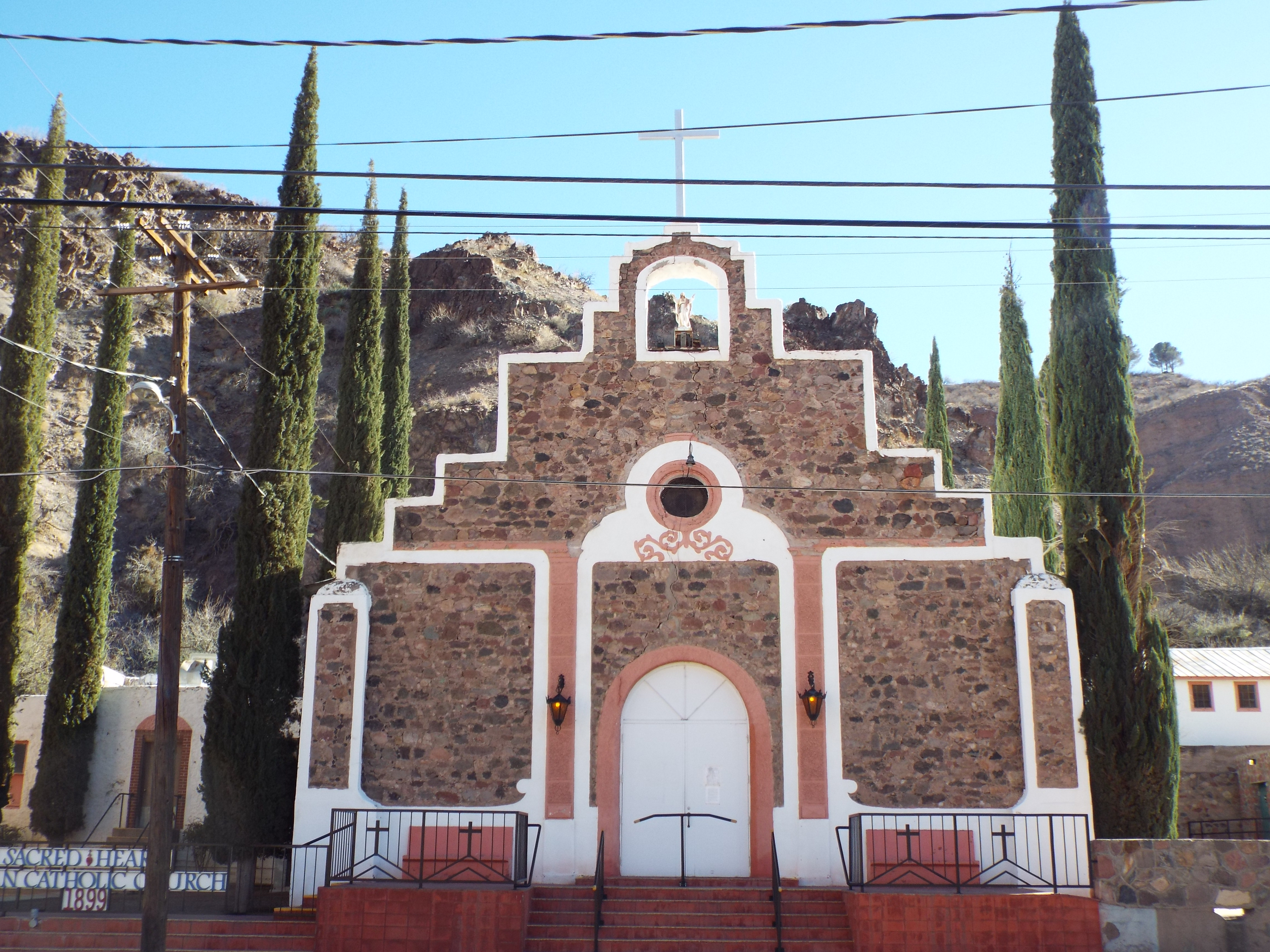
Sacred Heart Catholic Church – 1917

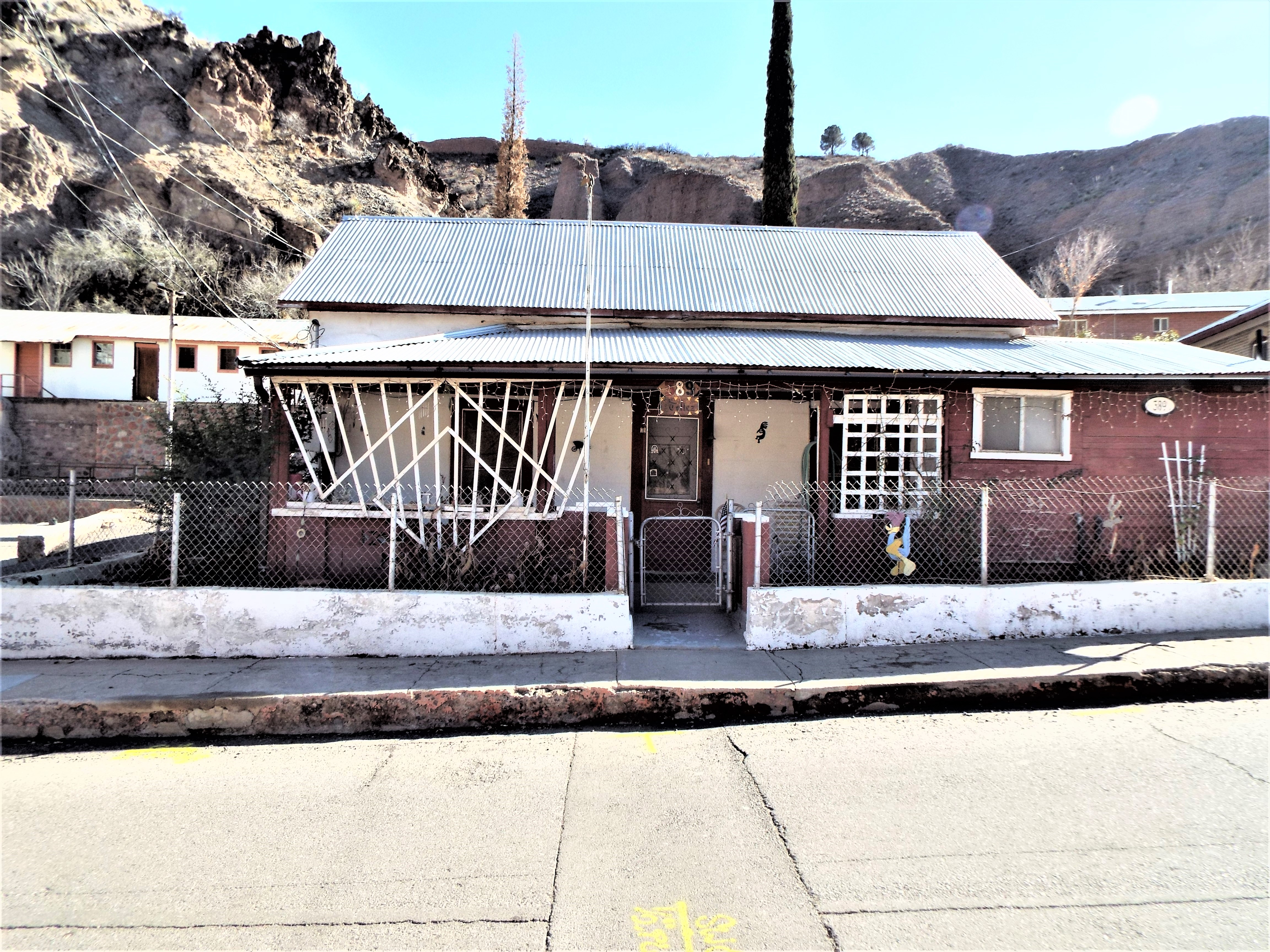
Claude Hooker House – 1896

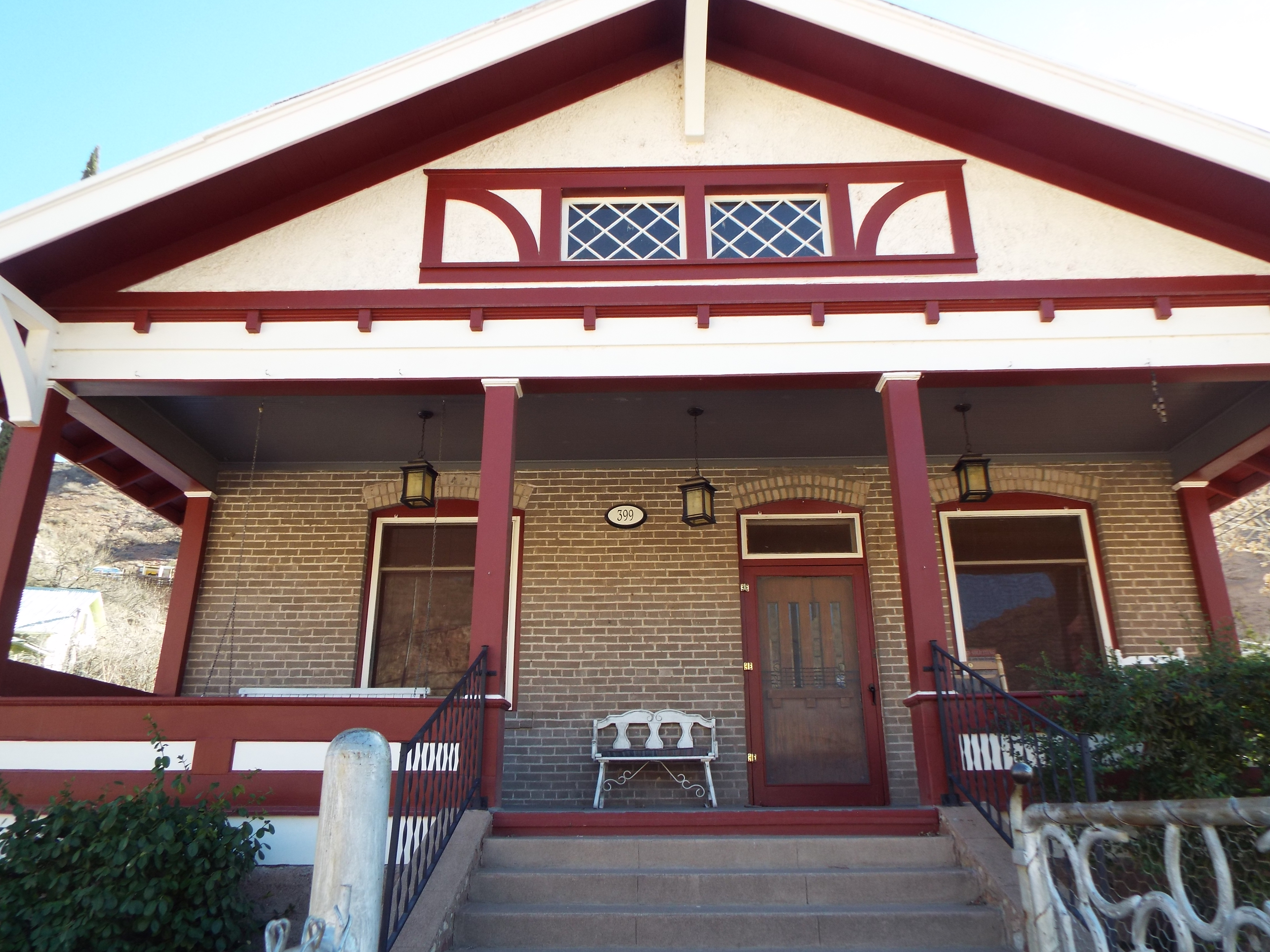
Antonio Spezia House – 1918

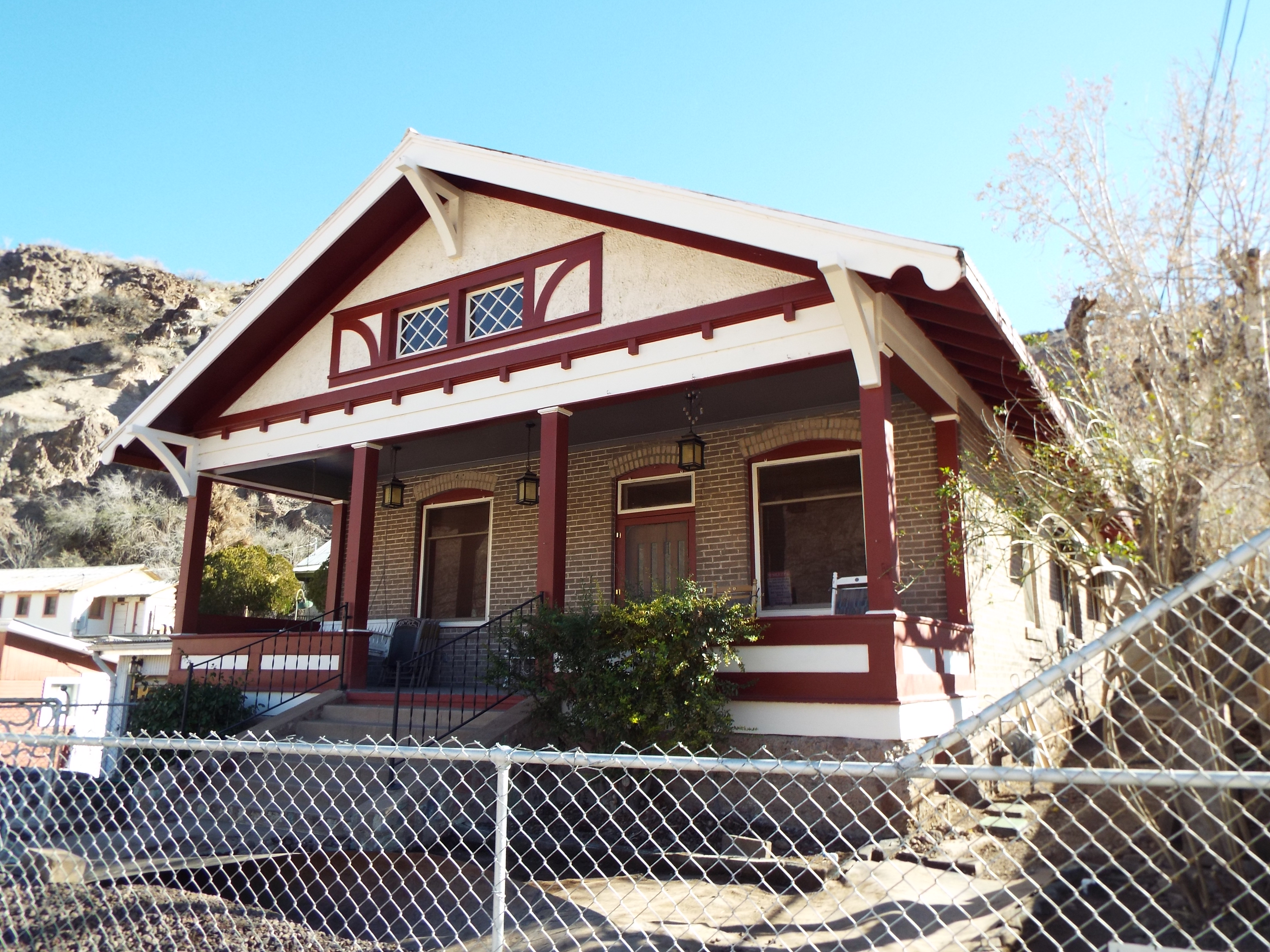
Different view of the Antonio Spezia House – 1918

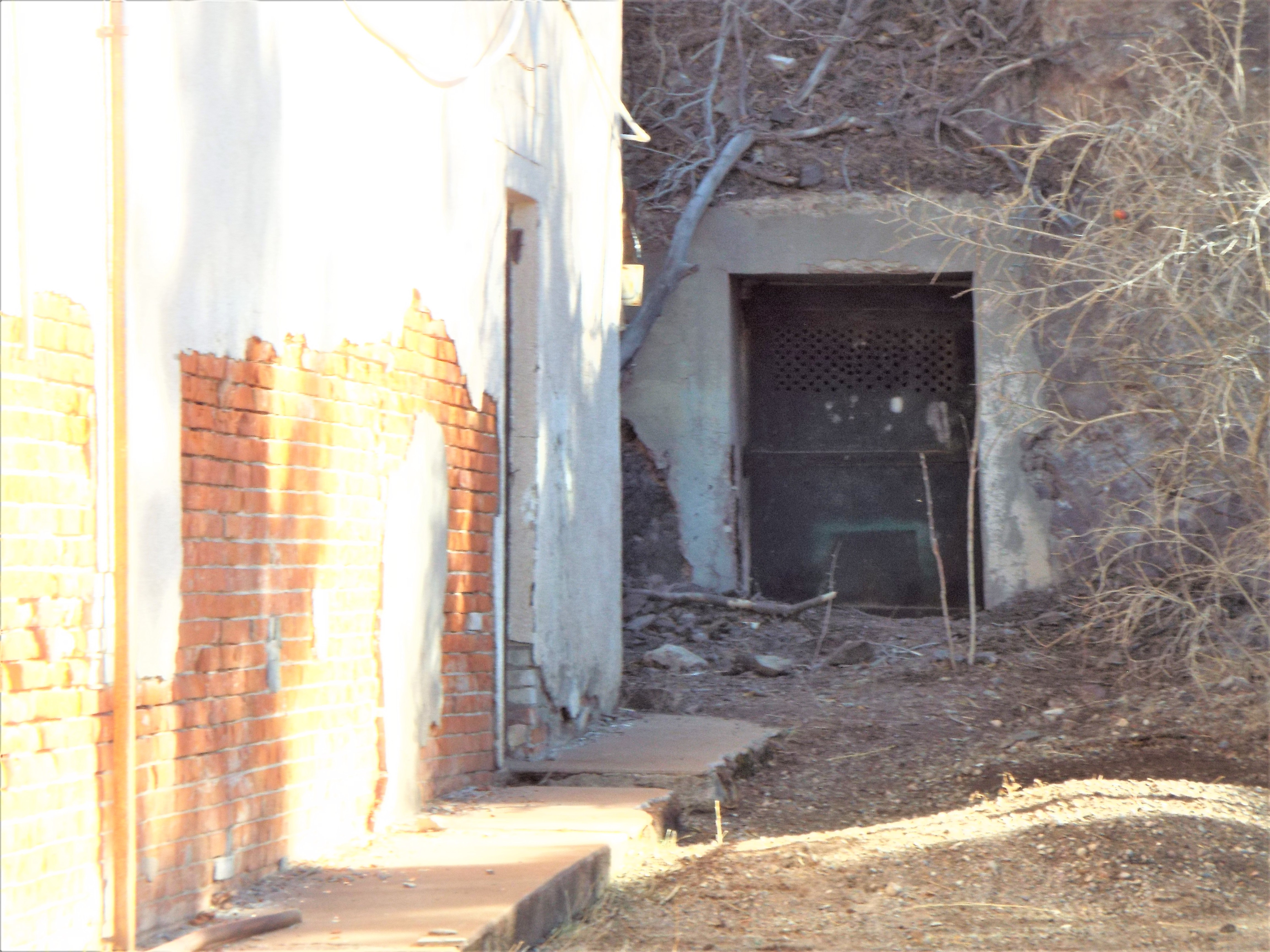
Ambrose Spezia's "Cave Bar" – 1911

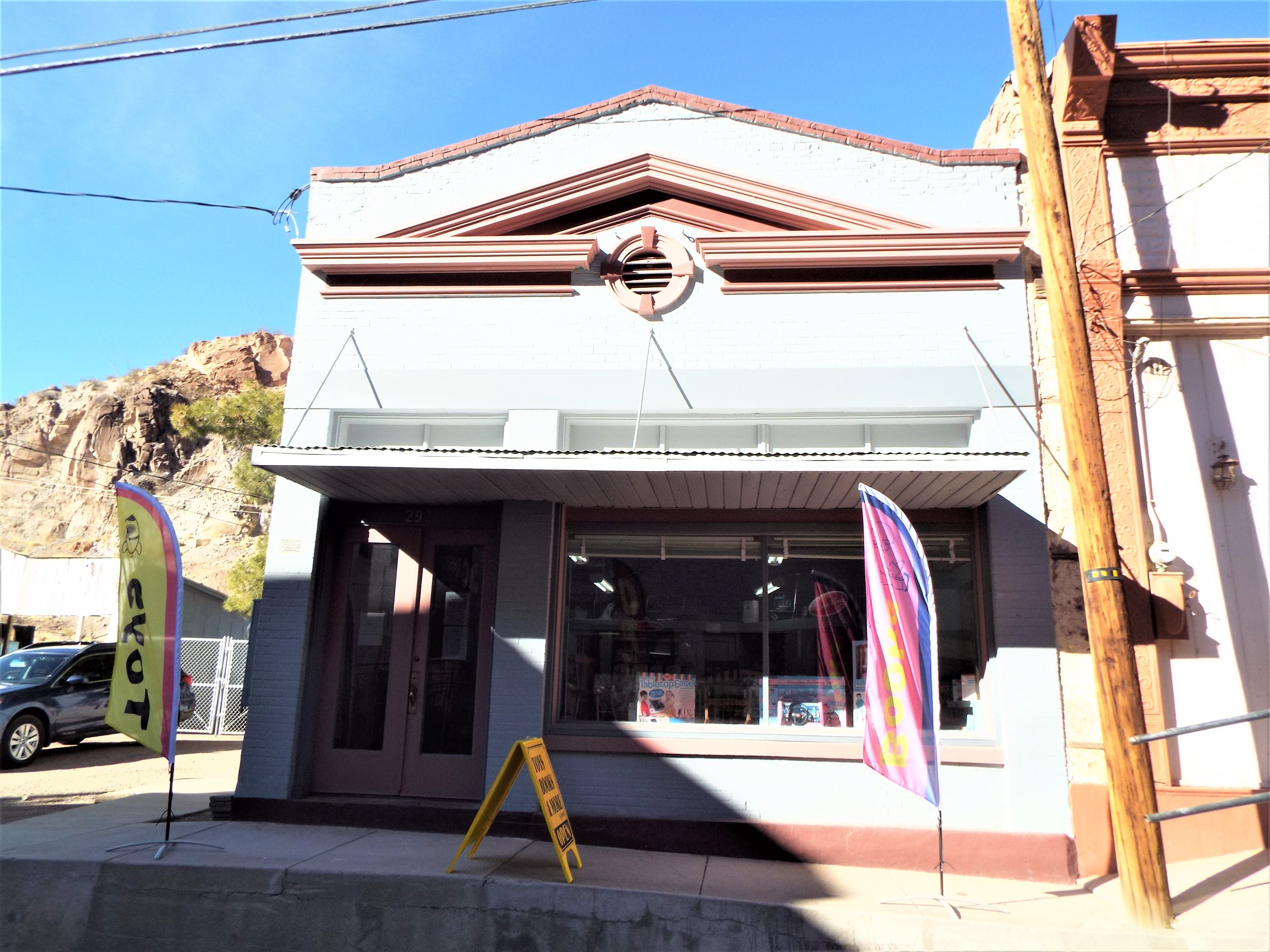
Doctor Harle's Office/Mexican Consulate – 1918

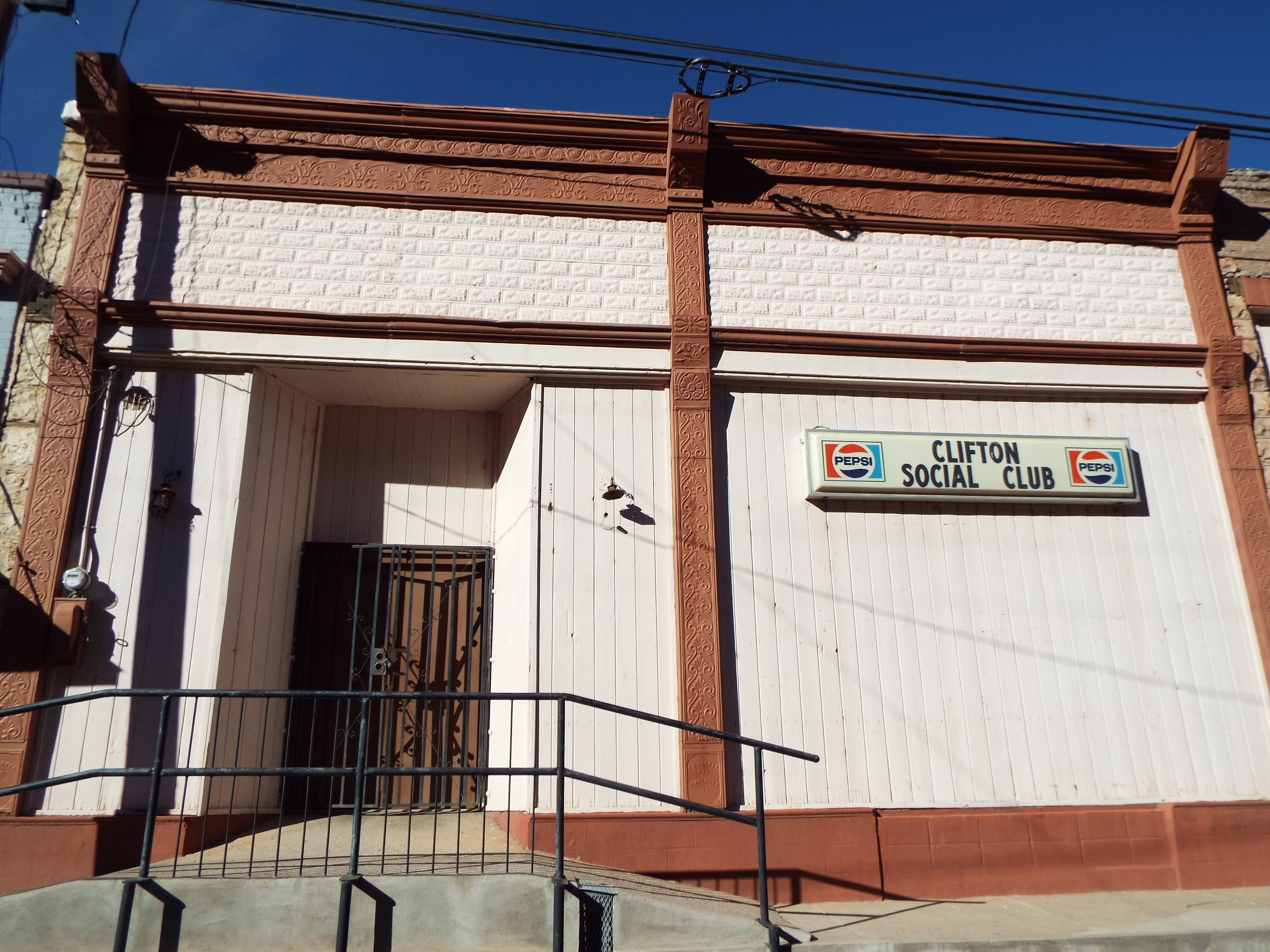
Clifton Social Club – 1913

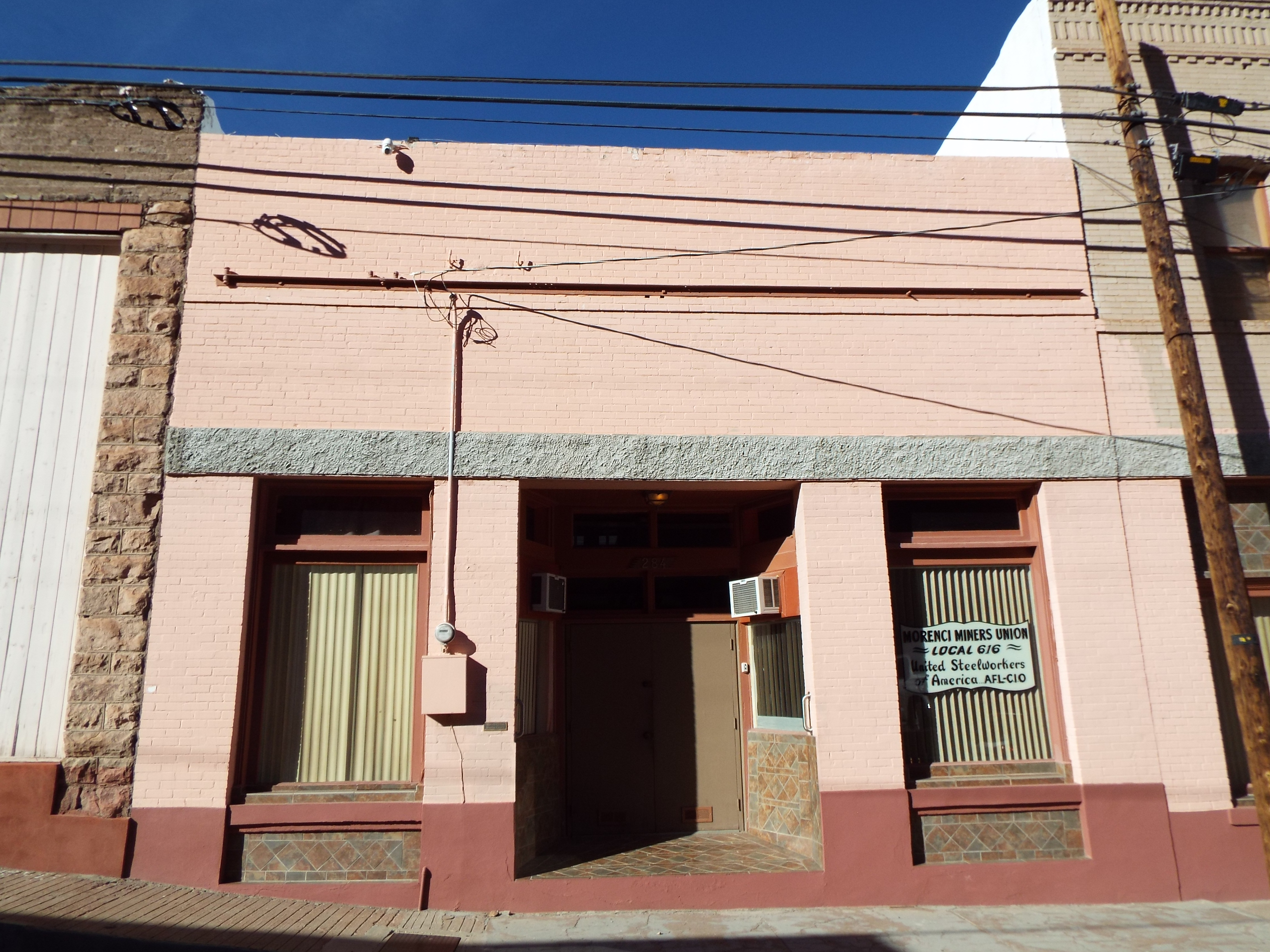
Clifton Union Hall – 1916

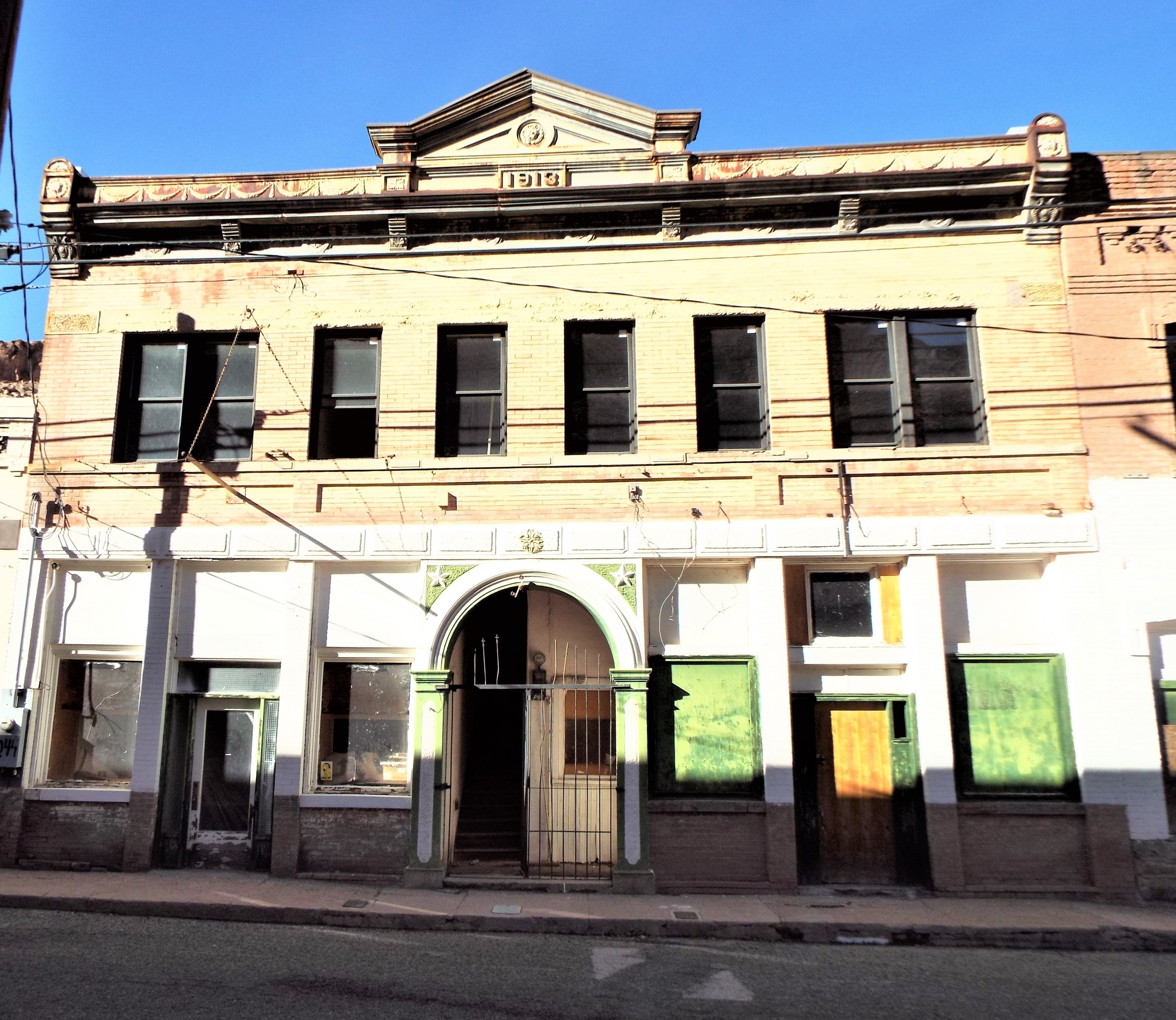
Drug Store/Law Office – 1913

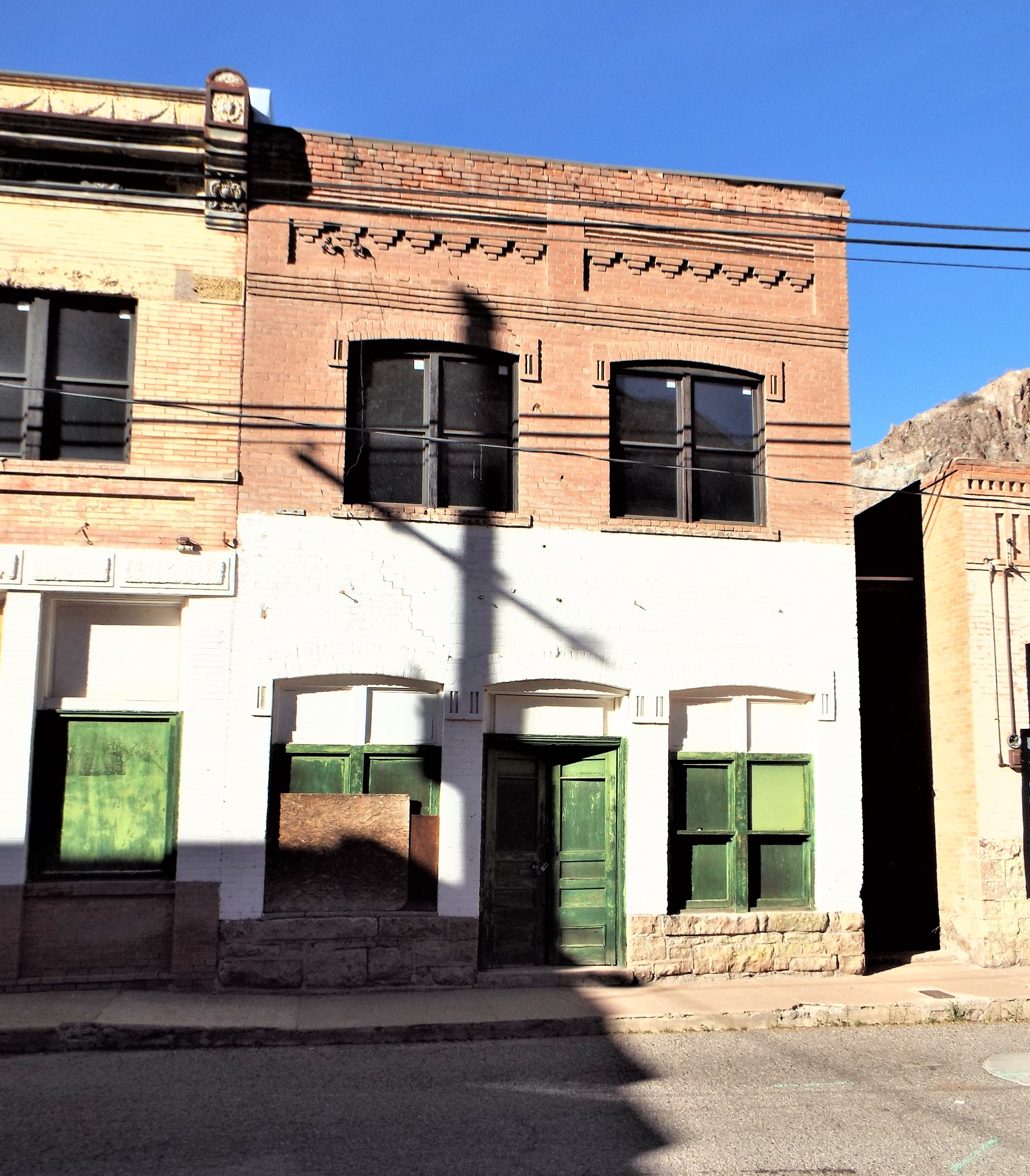
Old Buffet Bar – 1897

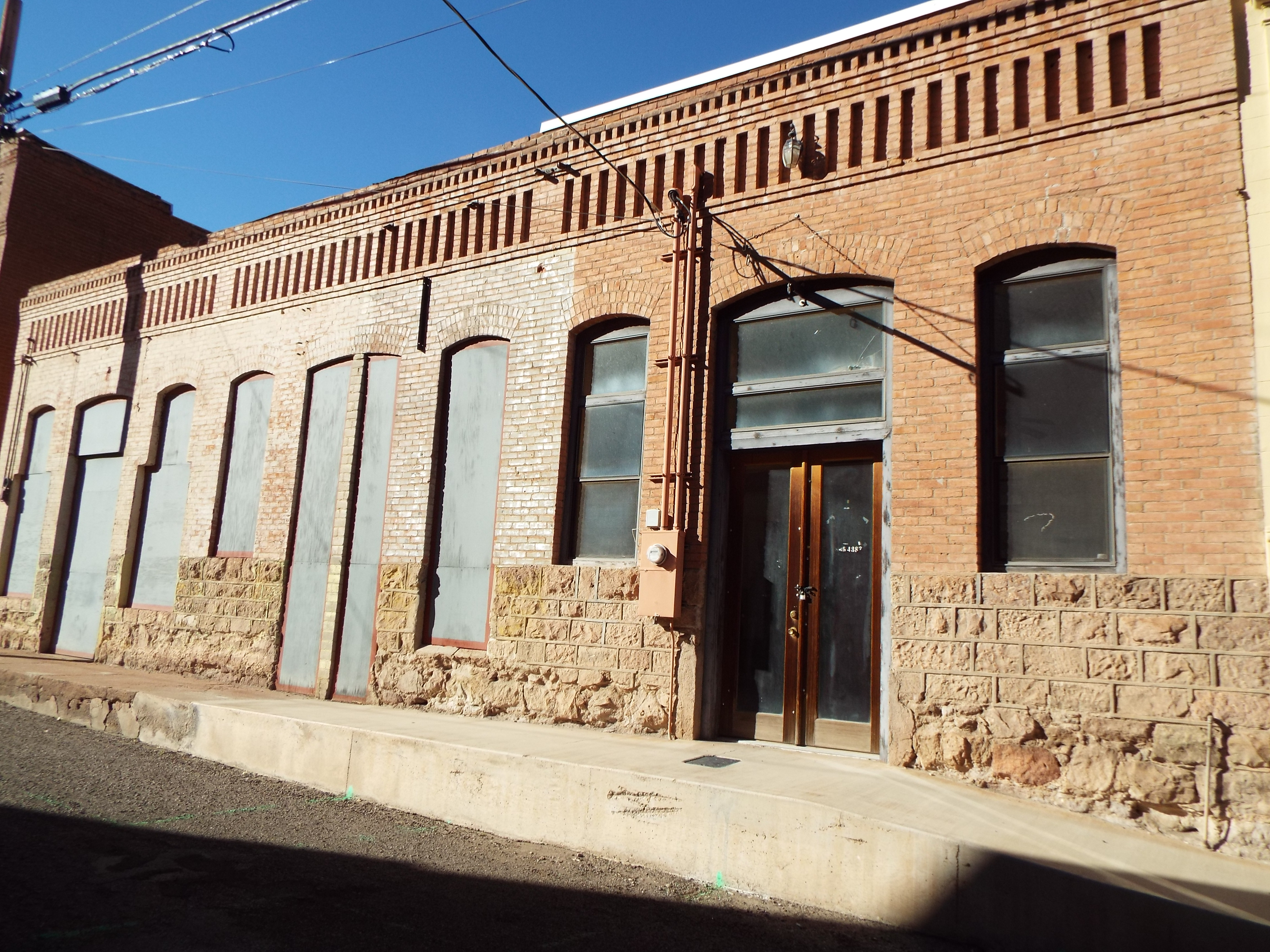
Greenlee Restaurant – 1907

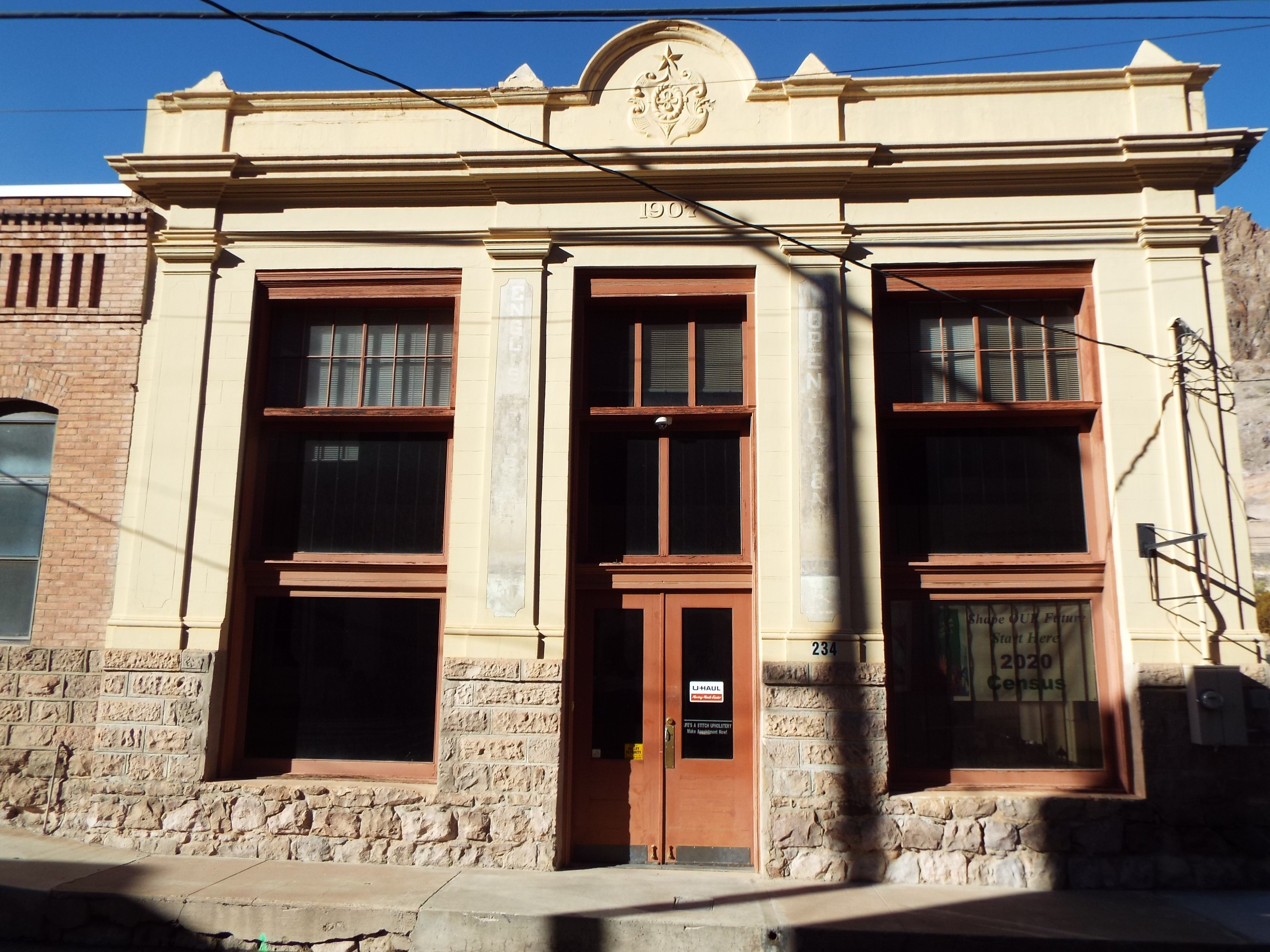
Jim Sing's Chop House – 1907

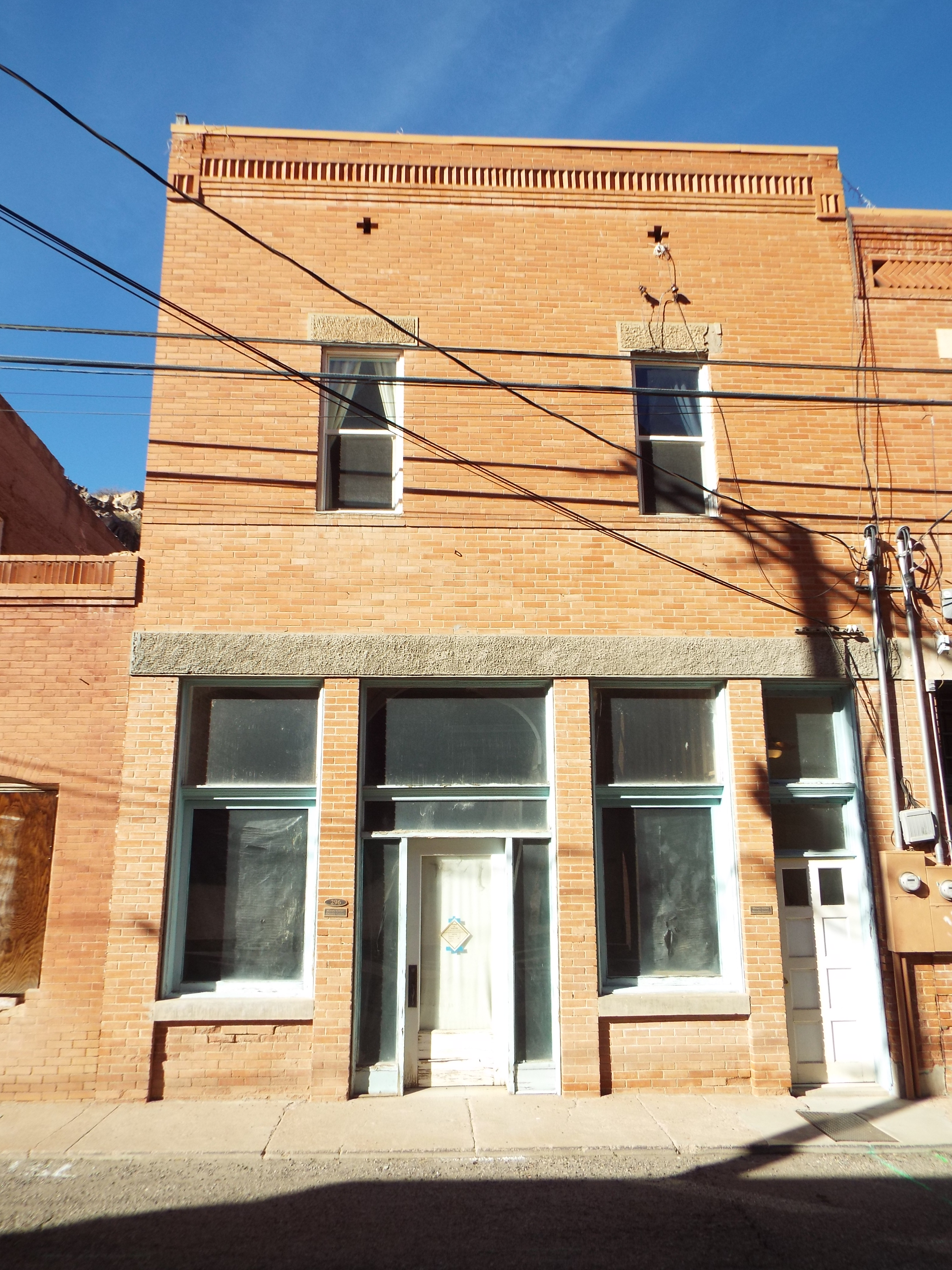
Storefront and living quarters – 1906

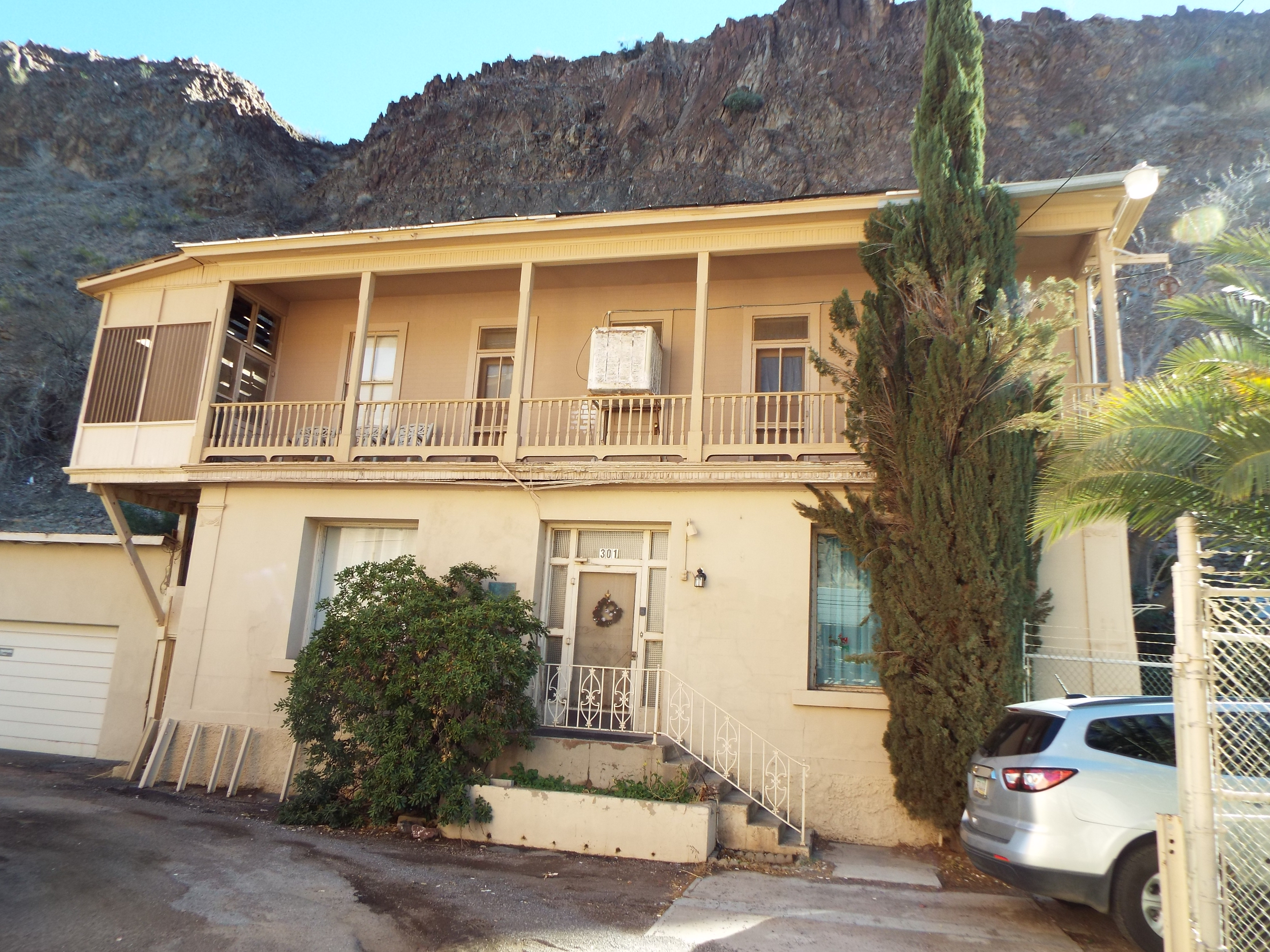
Palacio House – 1917

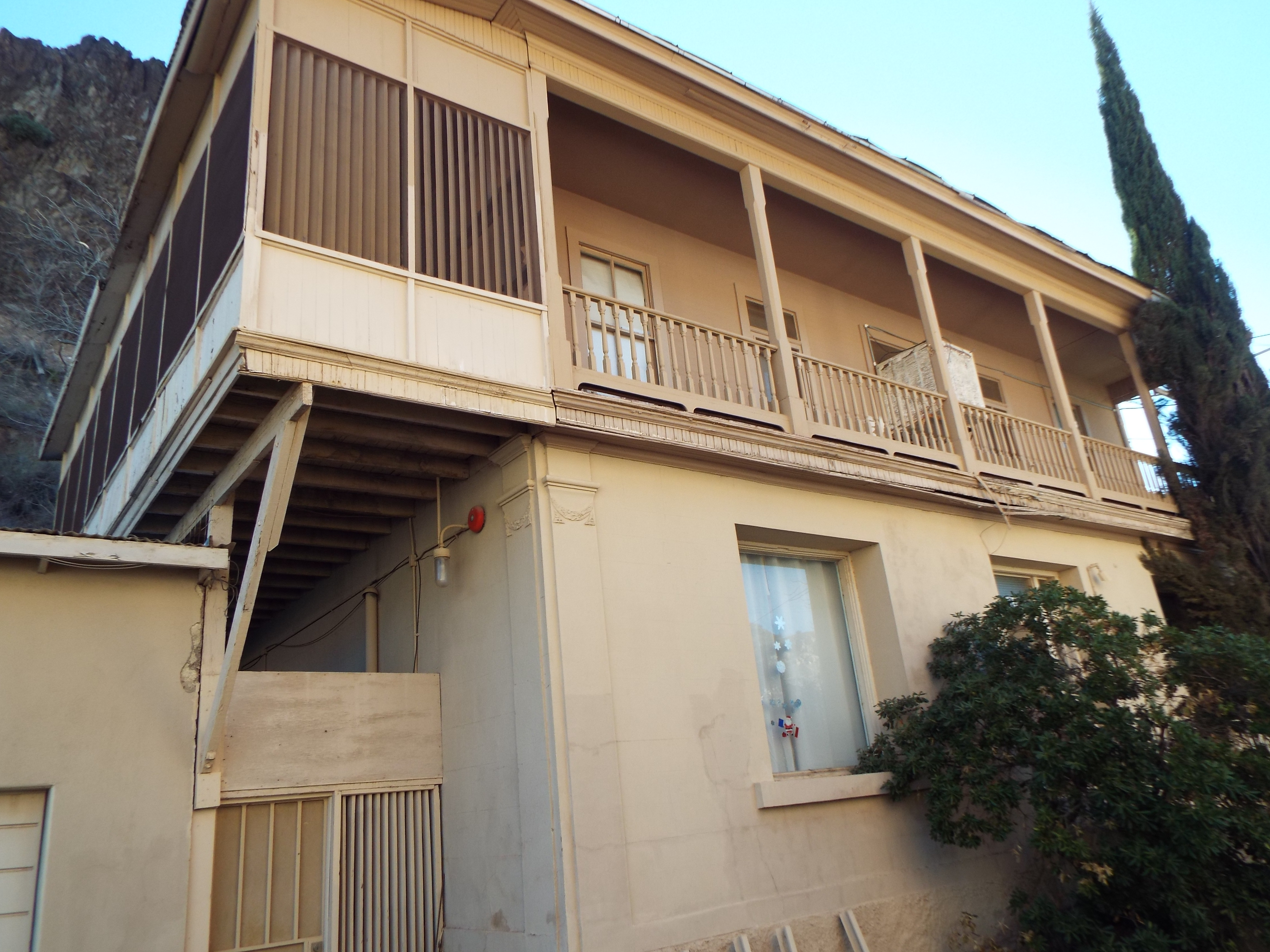
Different view of the Palacio House

Note: The first inmate in the Clifton Cliff Jail was Margarito Verala, the miner who built the jail.

Historic Clifton Cliff Jail

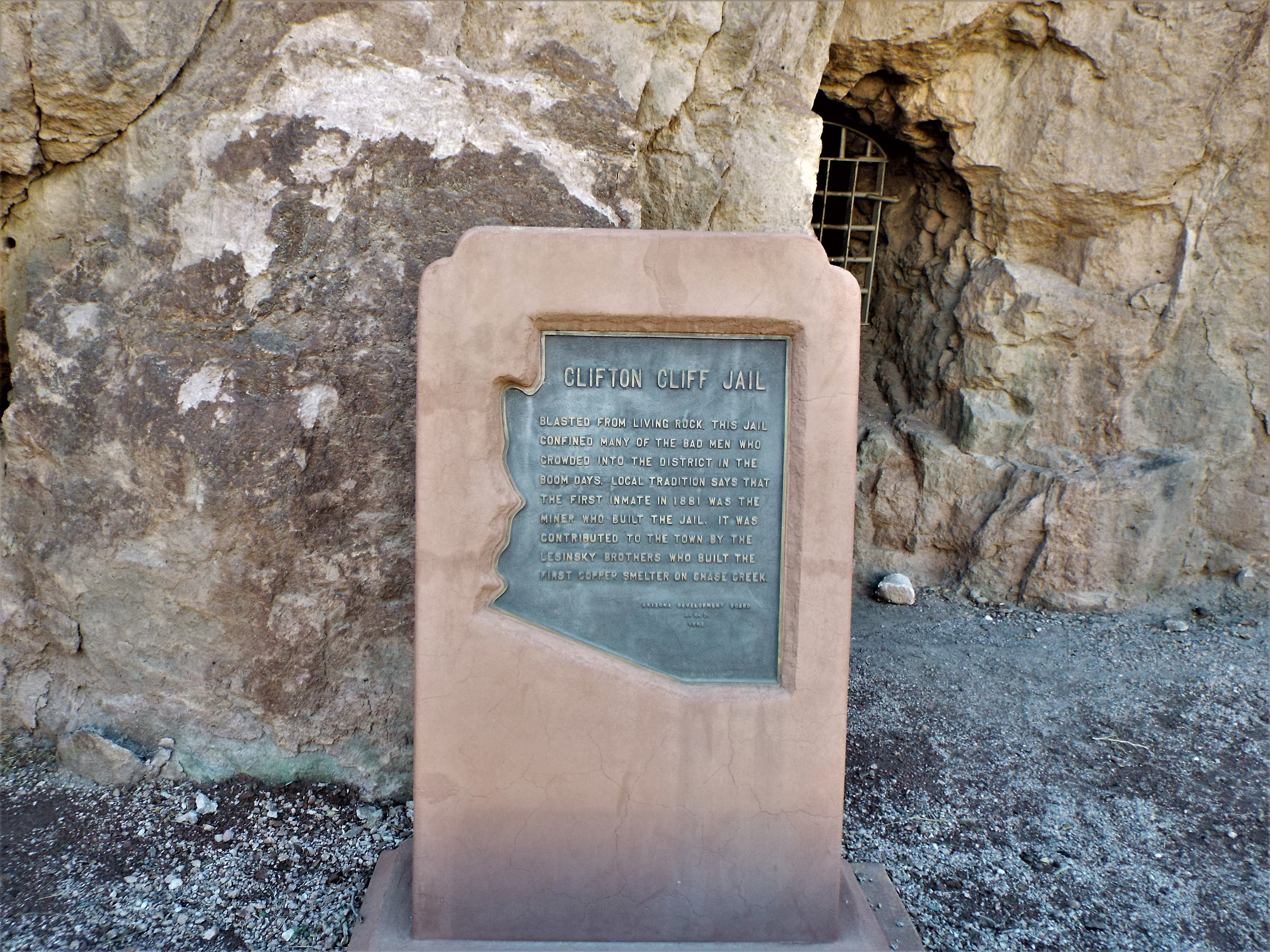
Clifton Cliff Jail marker

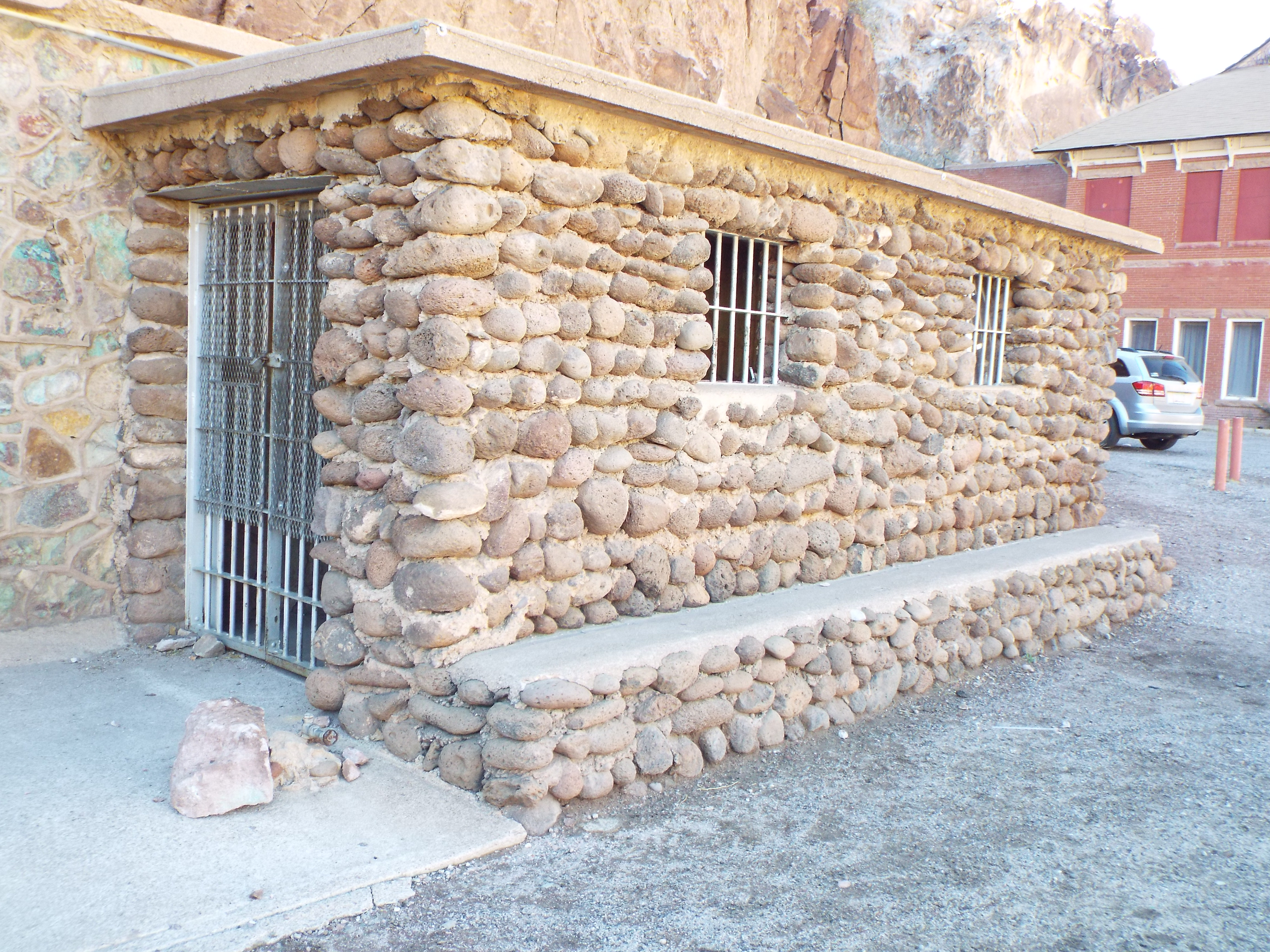
Jail main entrance

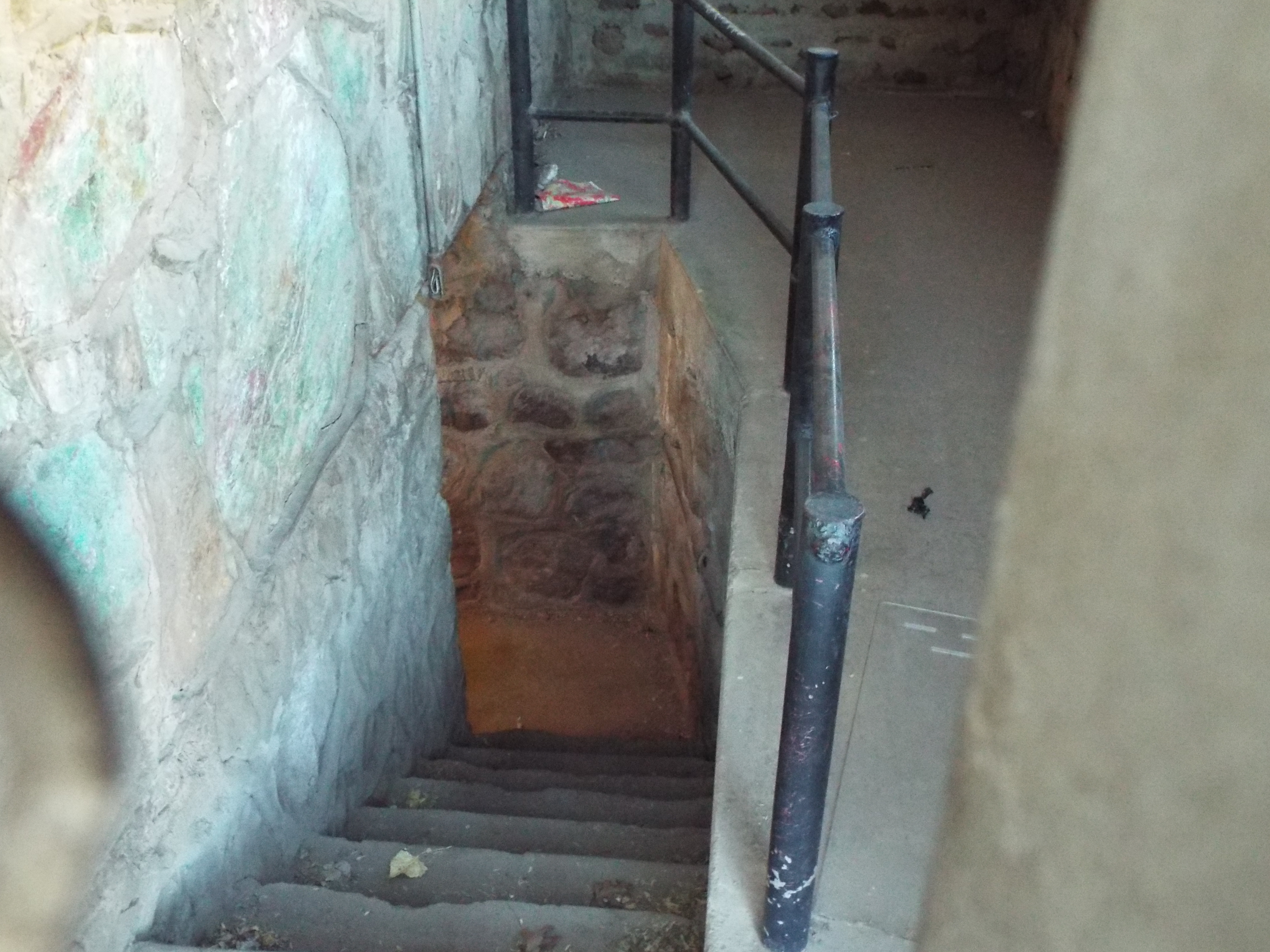
inside the jail main entrance

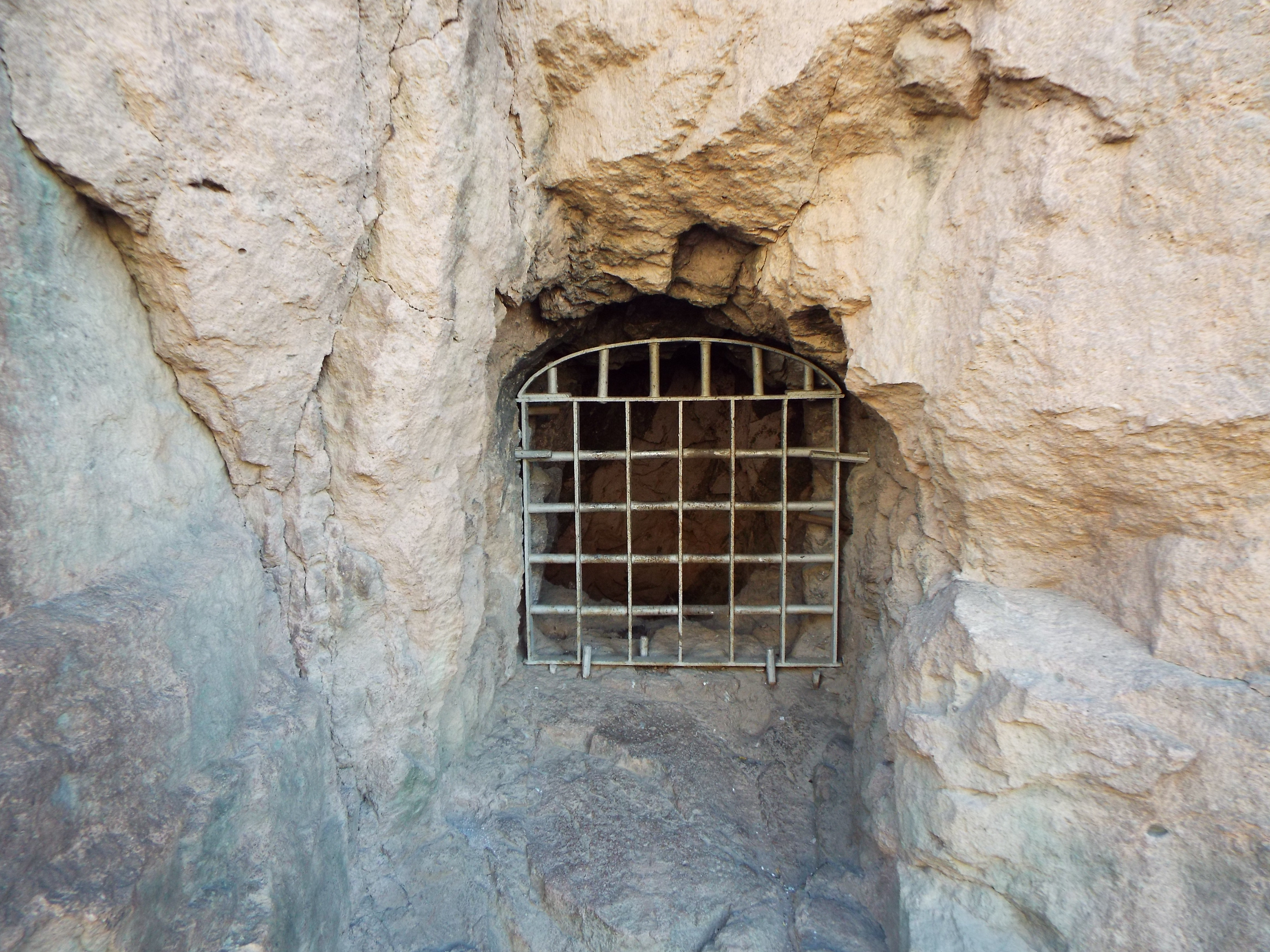
Clifton Cliff Jail Air hole

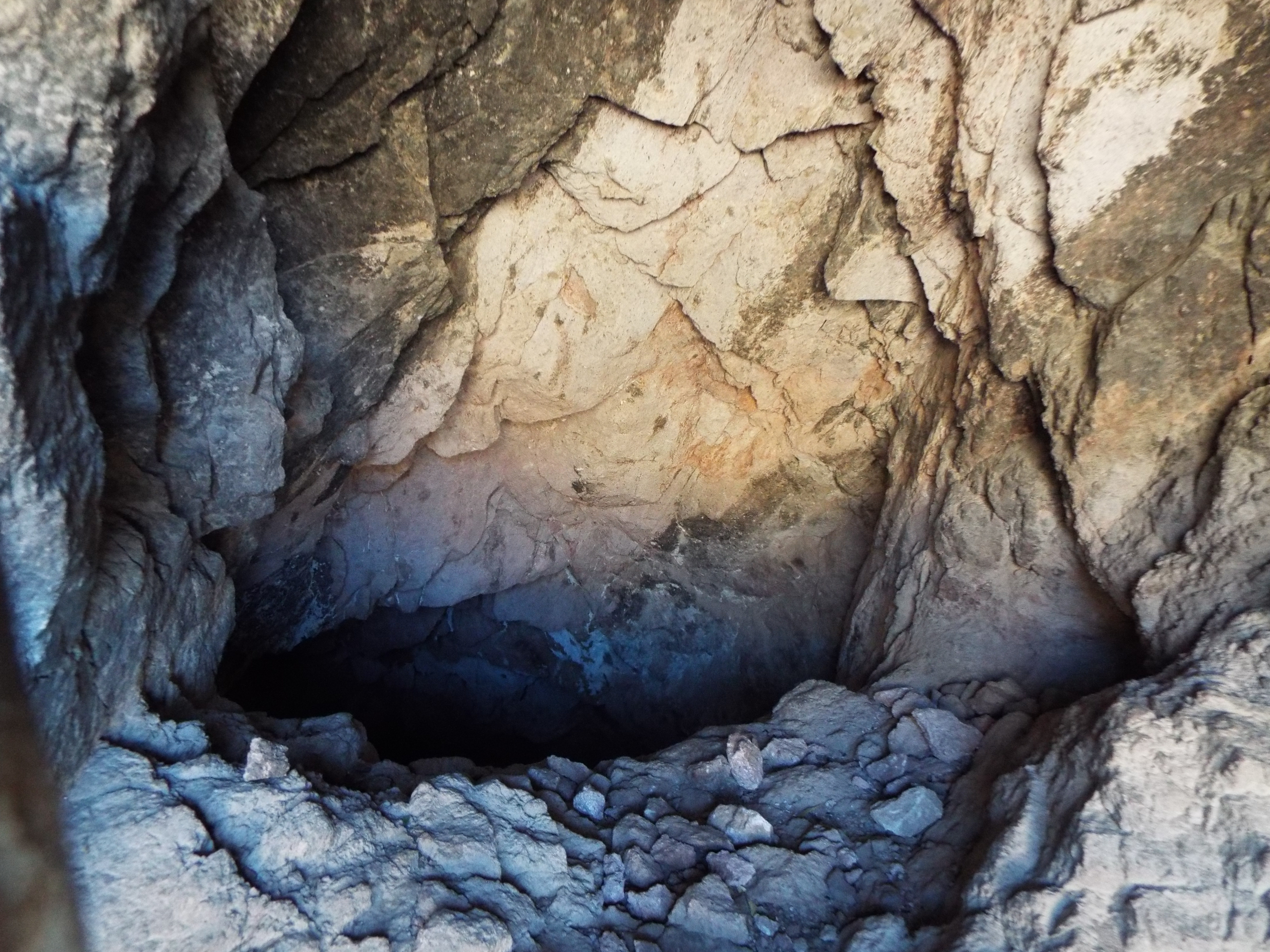
View inside the air hole

=== Park Avenue ===
The following historic business structures are located in Park Avenue. Park Avenue was originally called Conglomerate Avenue. The names and addresses posted of the structures are the original ones used when they were first built.

- Clifton Railroad Bridge of the Clifton Railroad – built in 1901 over the San Francisco River on Park Ave.
- Park Avenue Bridge (Zorilla Street Bridge) – built in 1918 on Zorilla Street over the San Francisco River. It is a steel Parker truss with a wood plank bed and concrete abutments. NRHP September 30, 1988, reference: #88001661.
- Clifton Smelter ruins – The first smelting was made in 1873 by the Lesinsky Brothers. The foundations and other elements which remain in this area are known to be a part of the 1884–1914 smelter.
- Clifton Smelter Cave – built in 1800s. Smelter employees used this cave to go to town after working hours.
- Clifton Casa Grande – built in 1874 – 8 Park Ave. NRHP June 26, 1979, reference: #79003445. This house was built by Henry Lesinsky
- The Blue Door Sanctuary – built in 1912 – 112 Park Ave. – the Blue Door Sanctuary was originally a Presbyterian church and later a Masonic lodge.
- Town Hall – built in 1920 – The Clifton Town Hall on Park Ave. is significant as the center of Clifton town government from 1920 to 1979.
- Clifton Amphitheater – built in 1913 and located on Park Ave.
- Hampton Block Building – built in 1890 – 53 Park Ave. – The building was named for brothers Wade and John Hampton, who were prominent businessmen. The building at one time housed the county offices before the courthouse was built. The first county board of supervisors meeting was held there in January 1911.
- Pascoe Undertaking and Funeral Parlor – built in 1917 – 167 Park Ave,
- Clifton Hotel – built in 1881 – 163 Park Ave. the first hotel built by Jake Abrahams
- Clifton Hot Springs & Spa – built in 1929 on Park Ave.
- James Colquhoun House – built in 1900 and located on Park Ave. Colquhoun was the president of the Arizona Copper Company. The house was originally across the San Francisco River near the train depot.
- P & H Model 1800 Excavator Shovel #11 – built in 1959 – The Mining Shovel Display on Park Ave. is a heavy-duty mechanical shovel that was state of the art decades ago
Historic Park Avenue

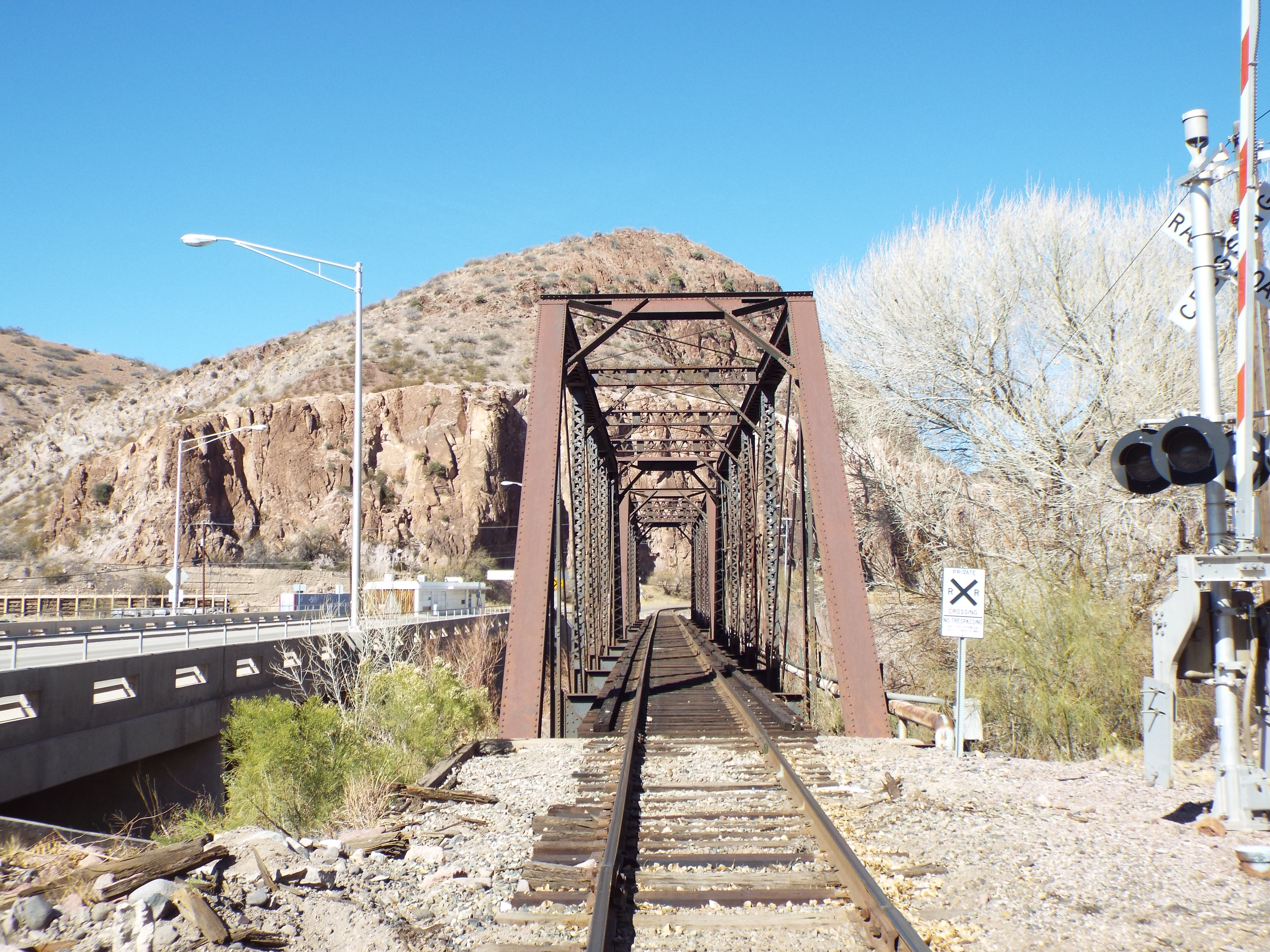
Clifton Railroad Bridge

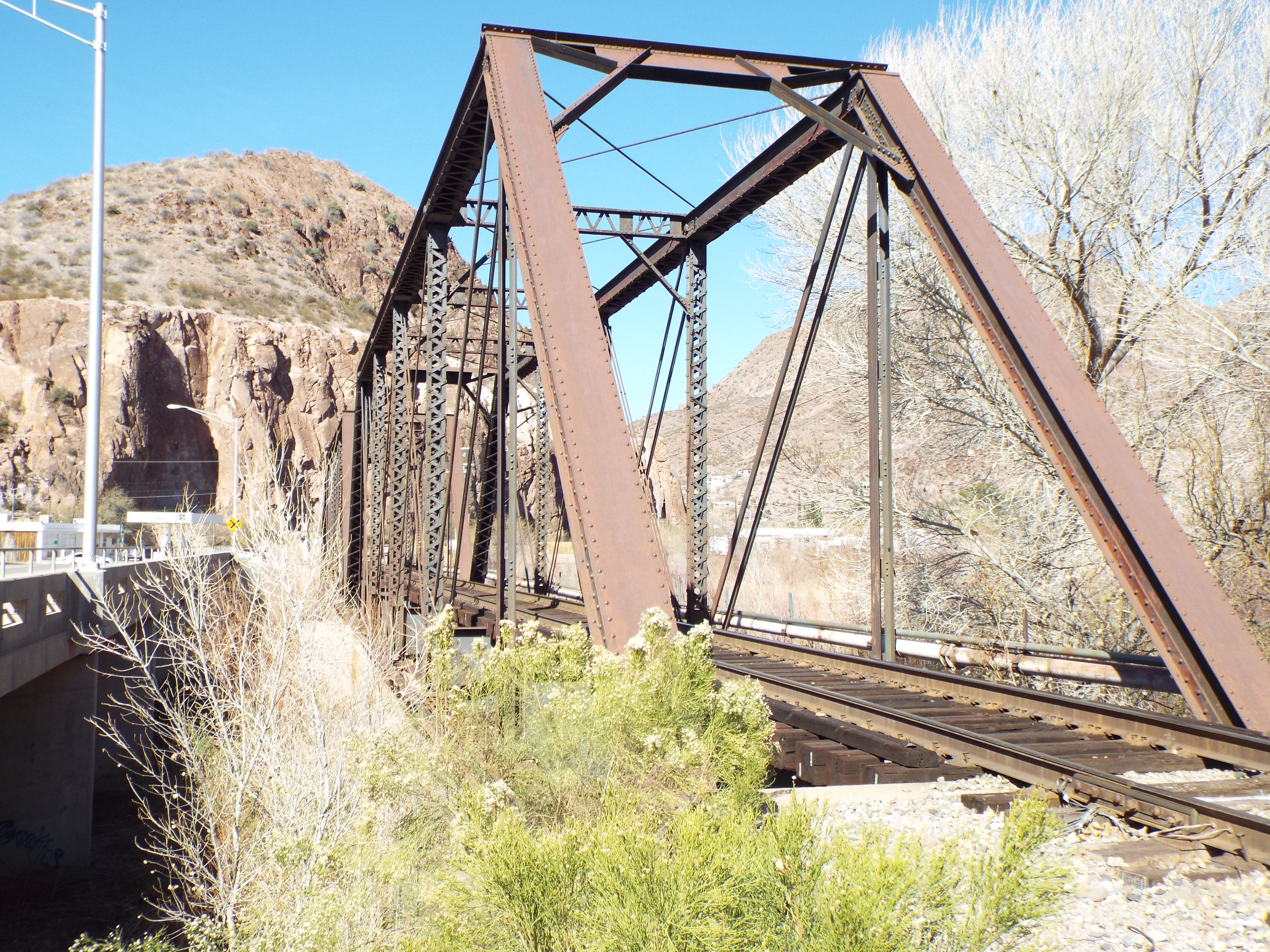
Railroad Bridge – 1901

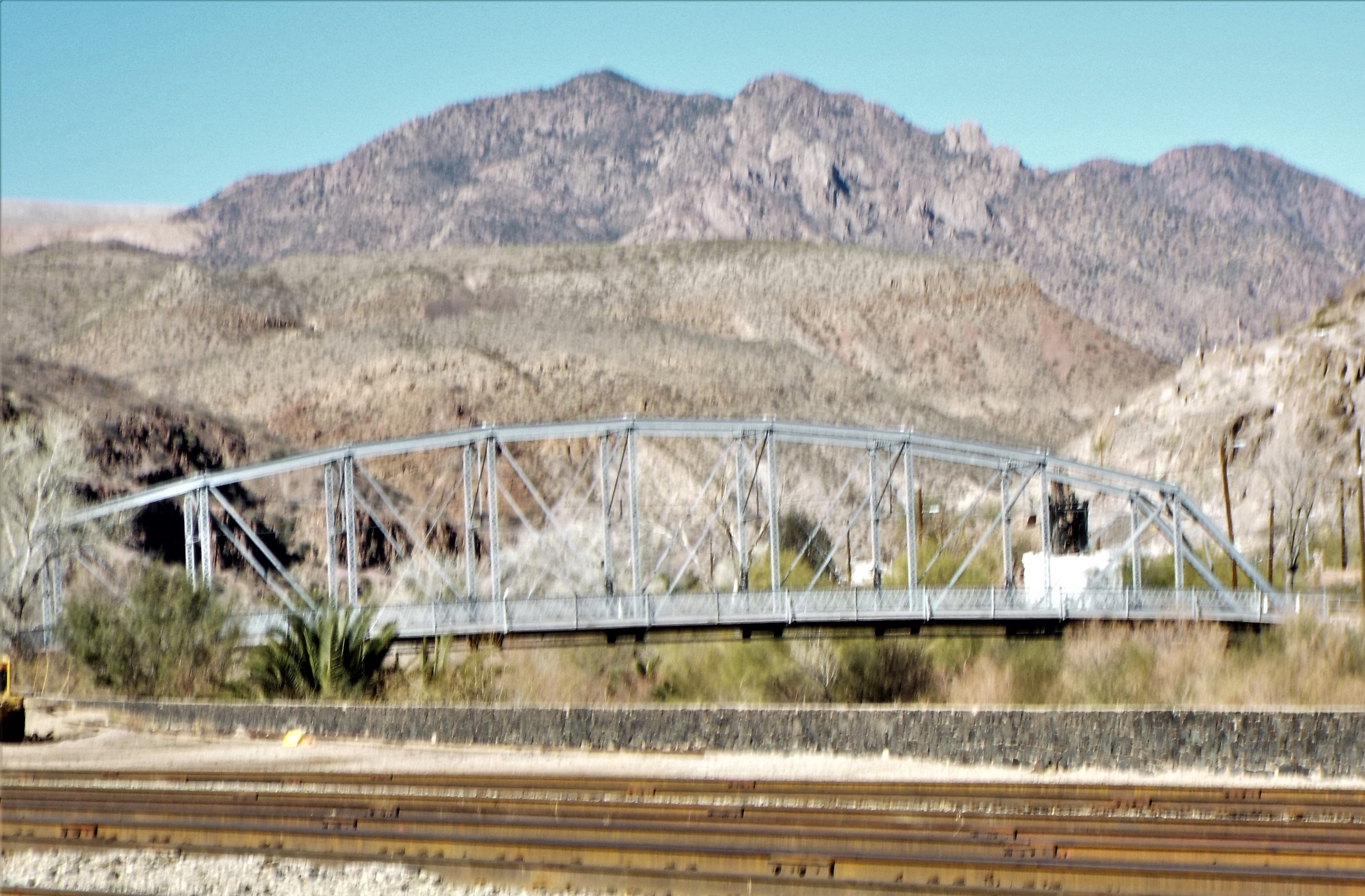
Park Avenue Bridge (Zorilla Street Bridge) – 1918

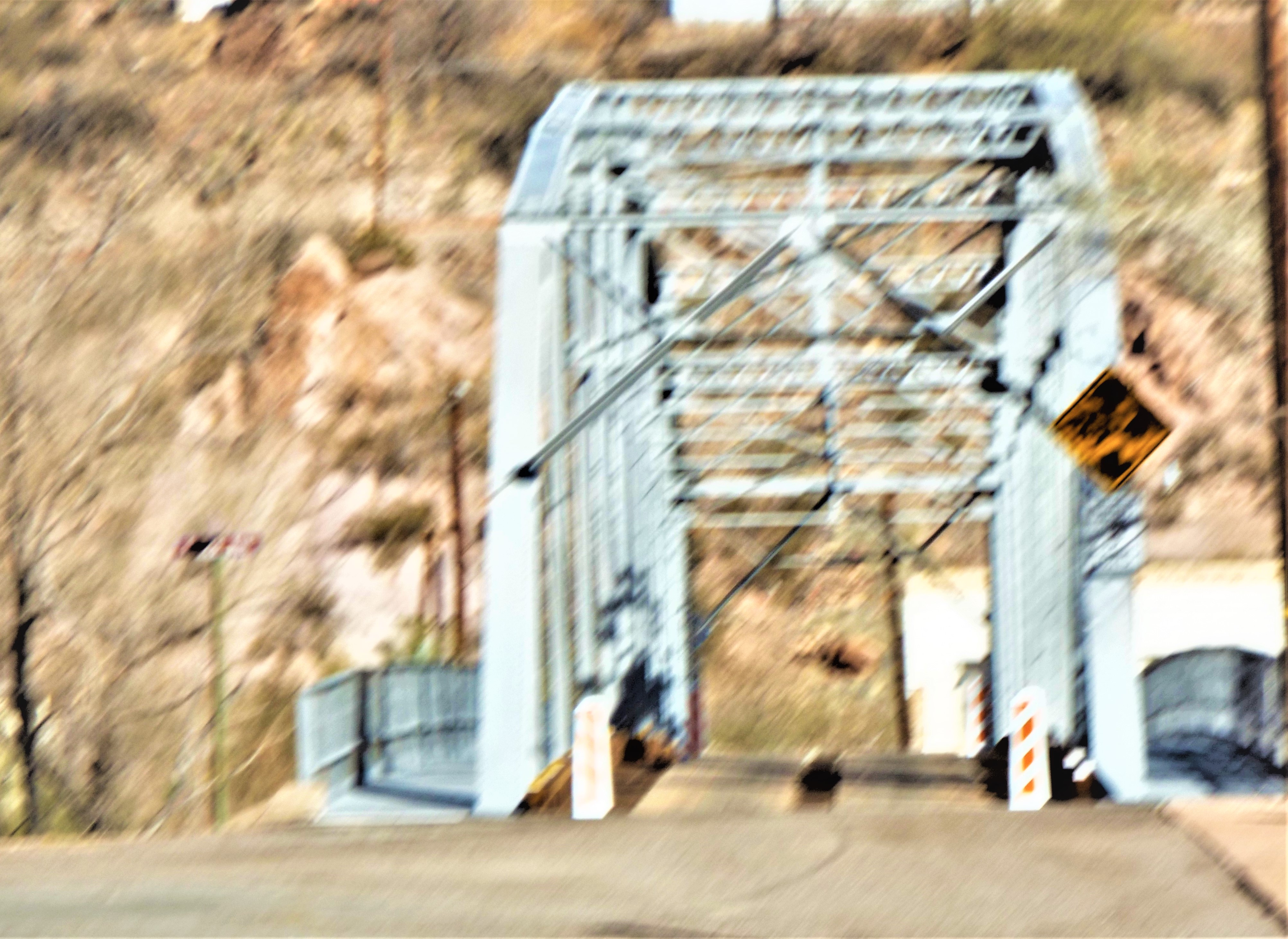
Different view of the Park Avenue Bridge (Zorilla Street Bridge)

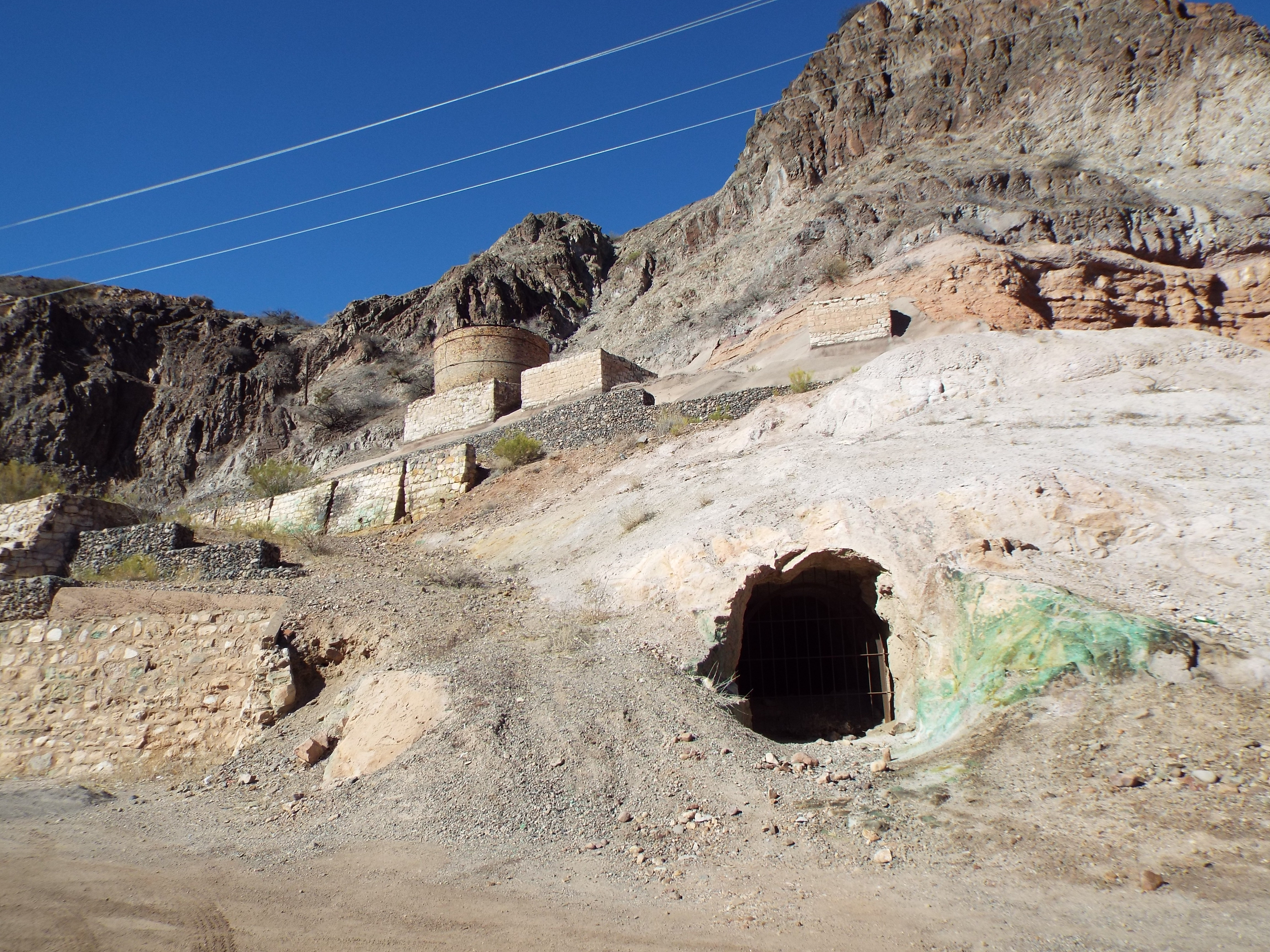
Clifton Smelter ruins and Cave

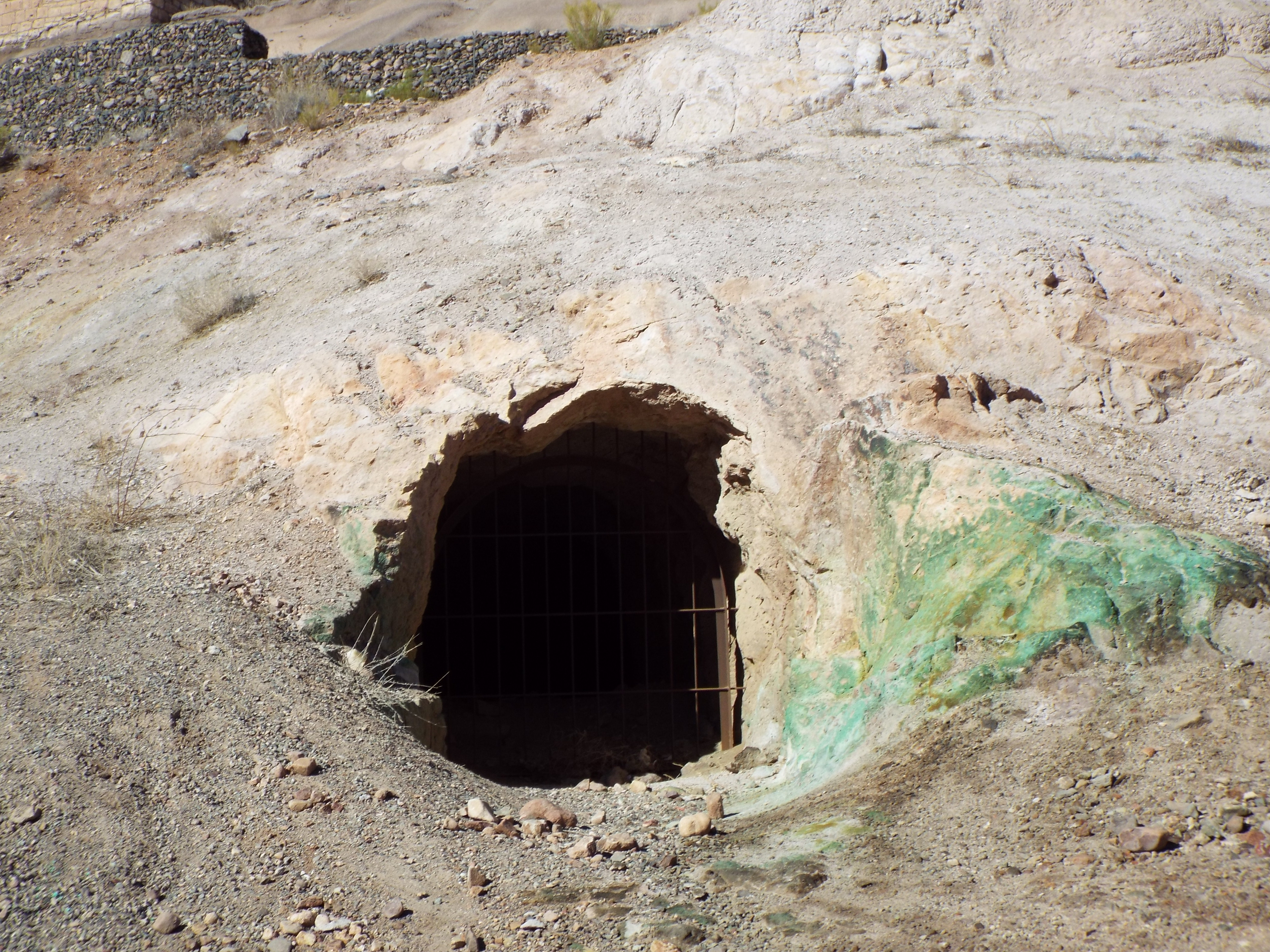
Clifton Smelter Cave

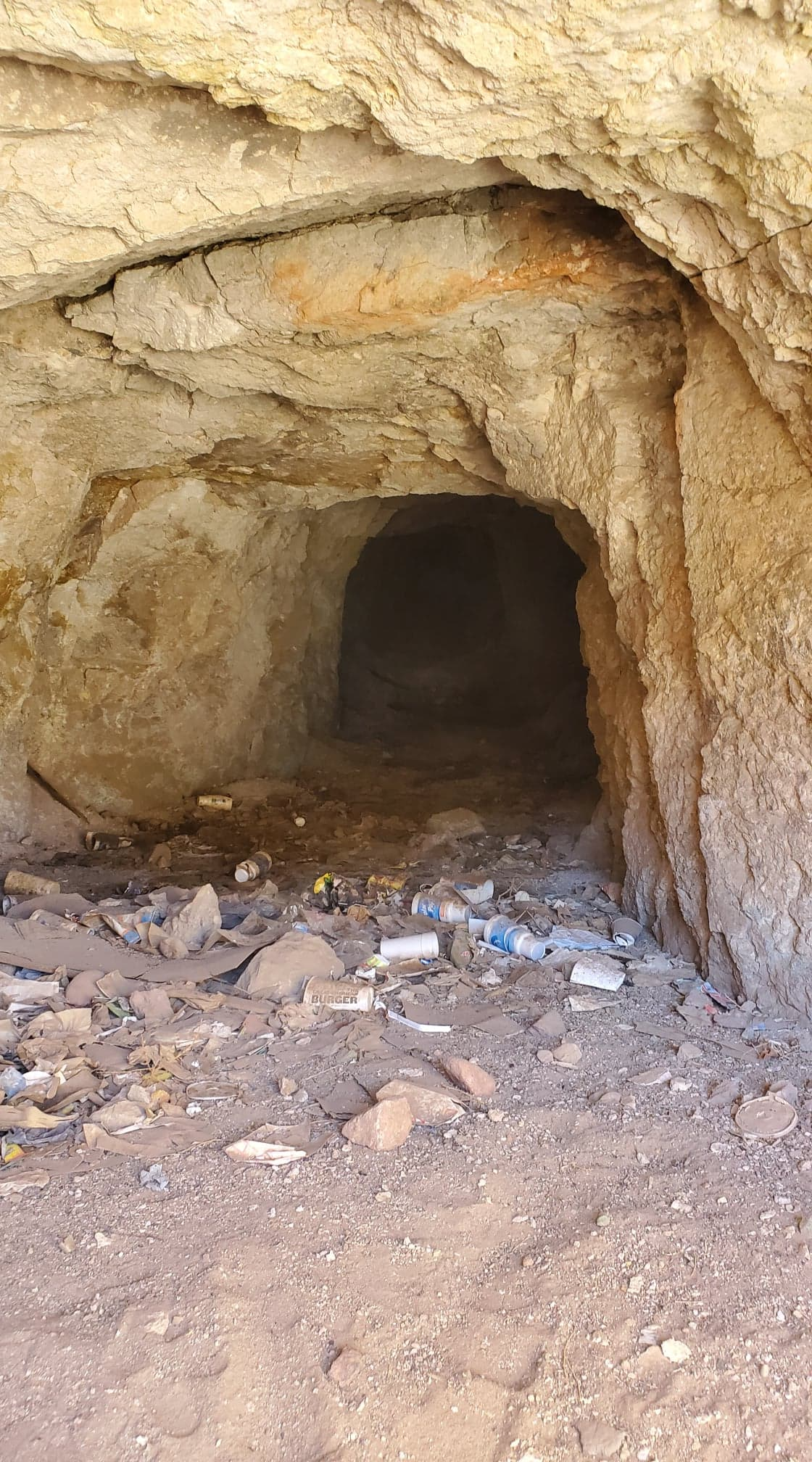
Inside the Clifton Smelter Cave

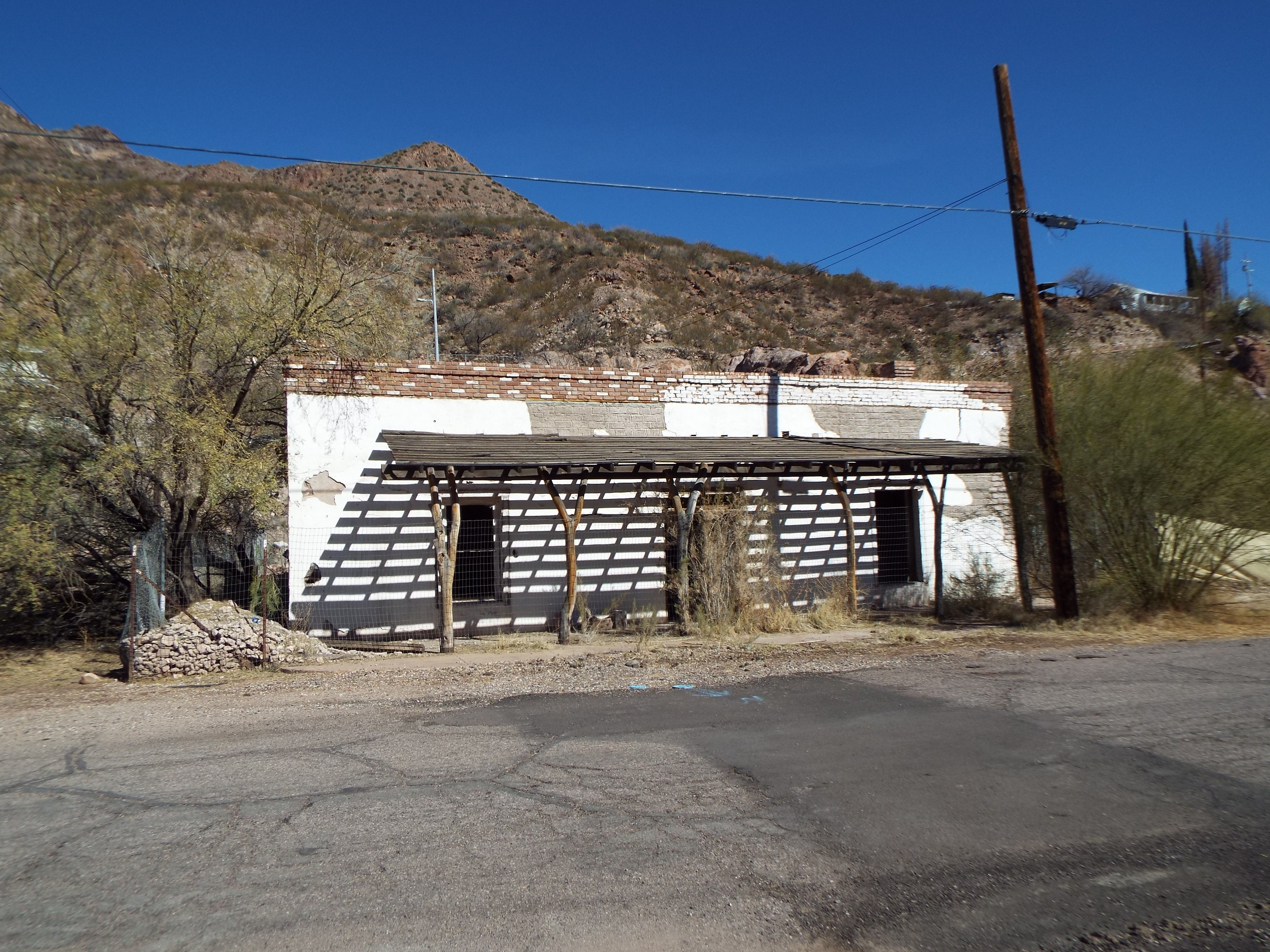
Clifton Casa Grande – 1894

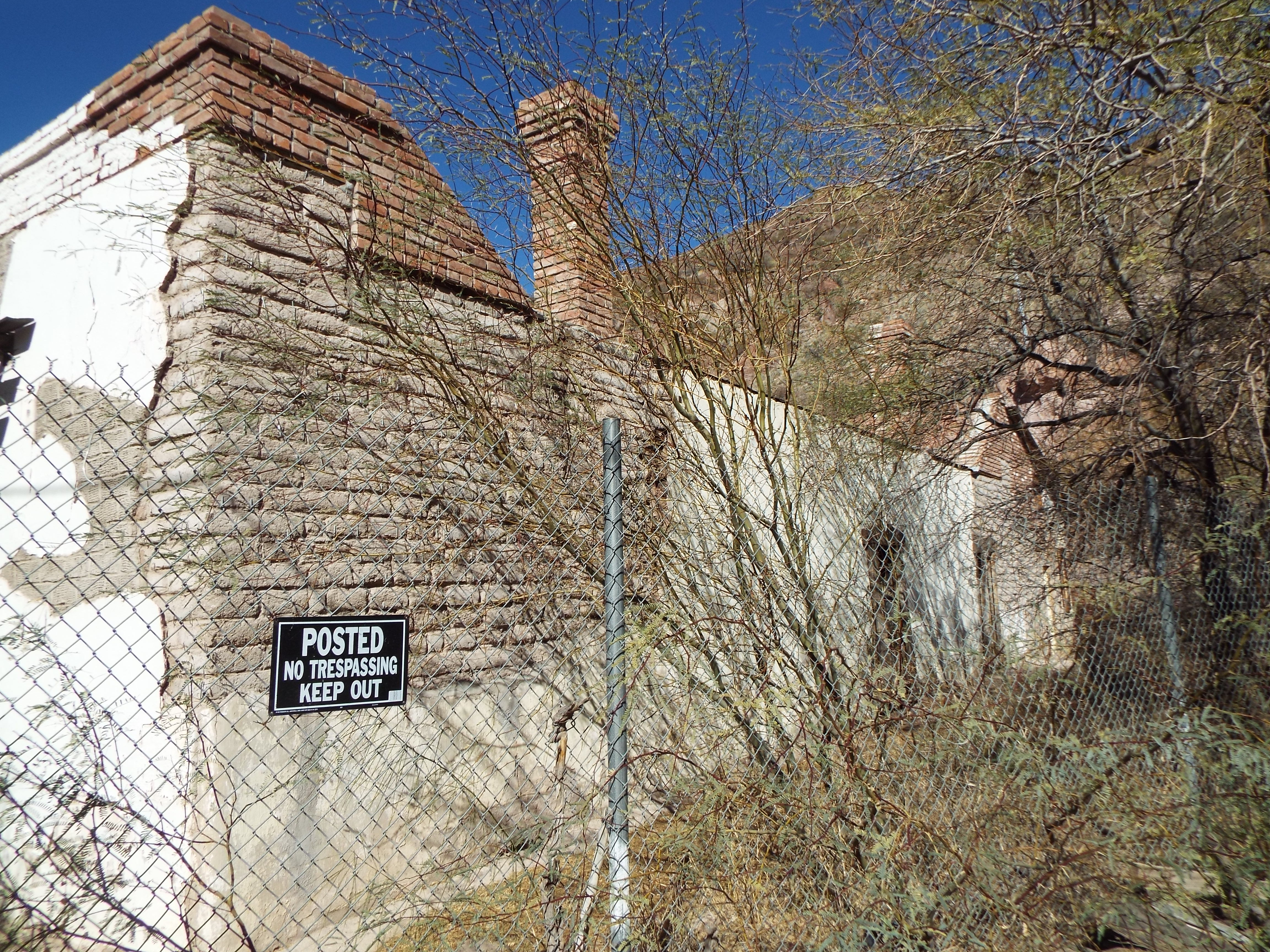
Side view of the Clifton Casa Grande

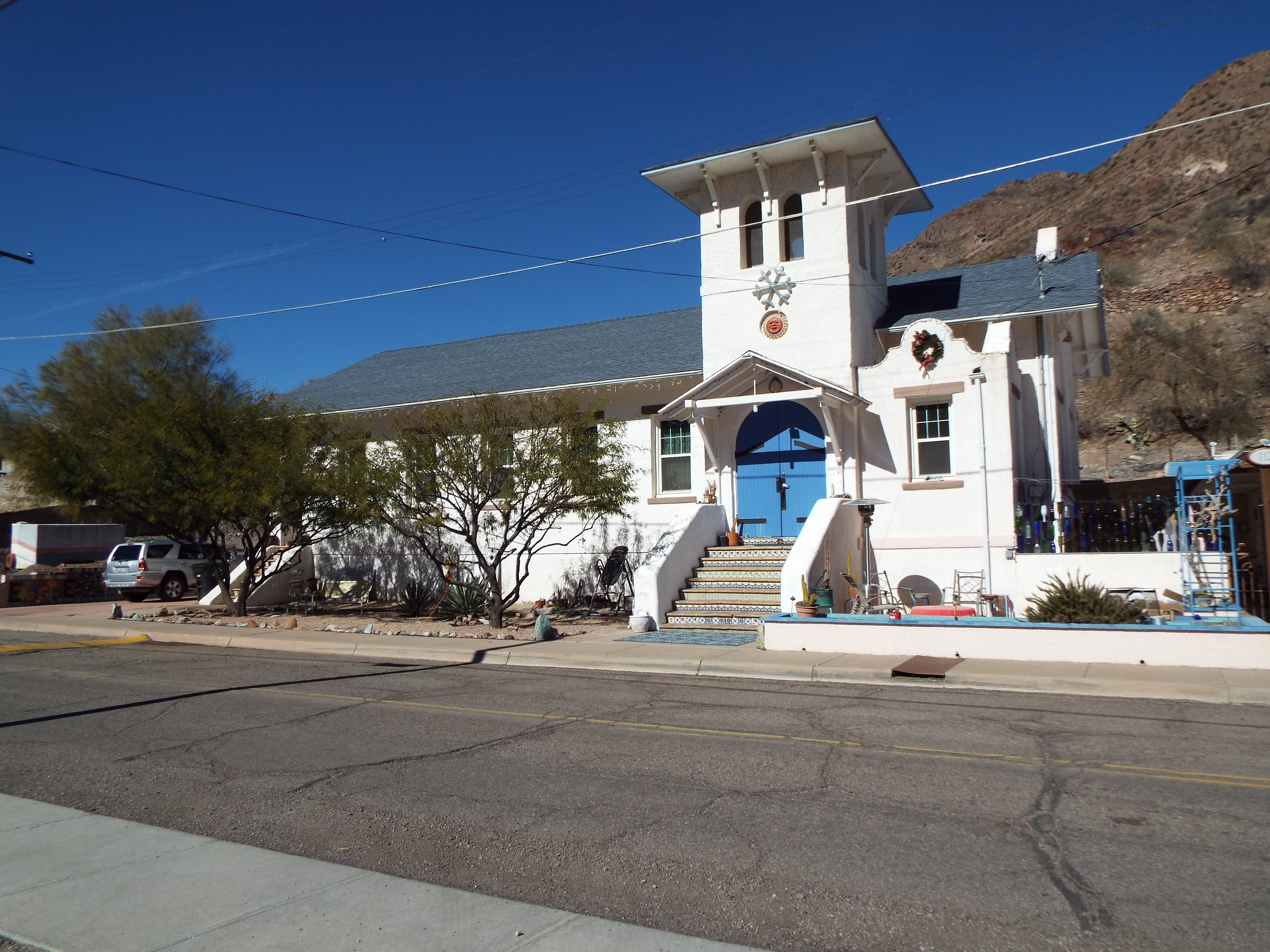
Blue Door Sanctuary – 1912

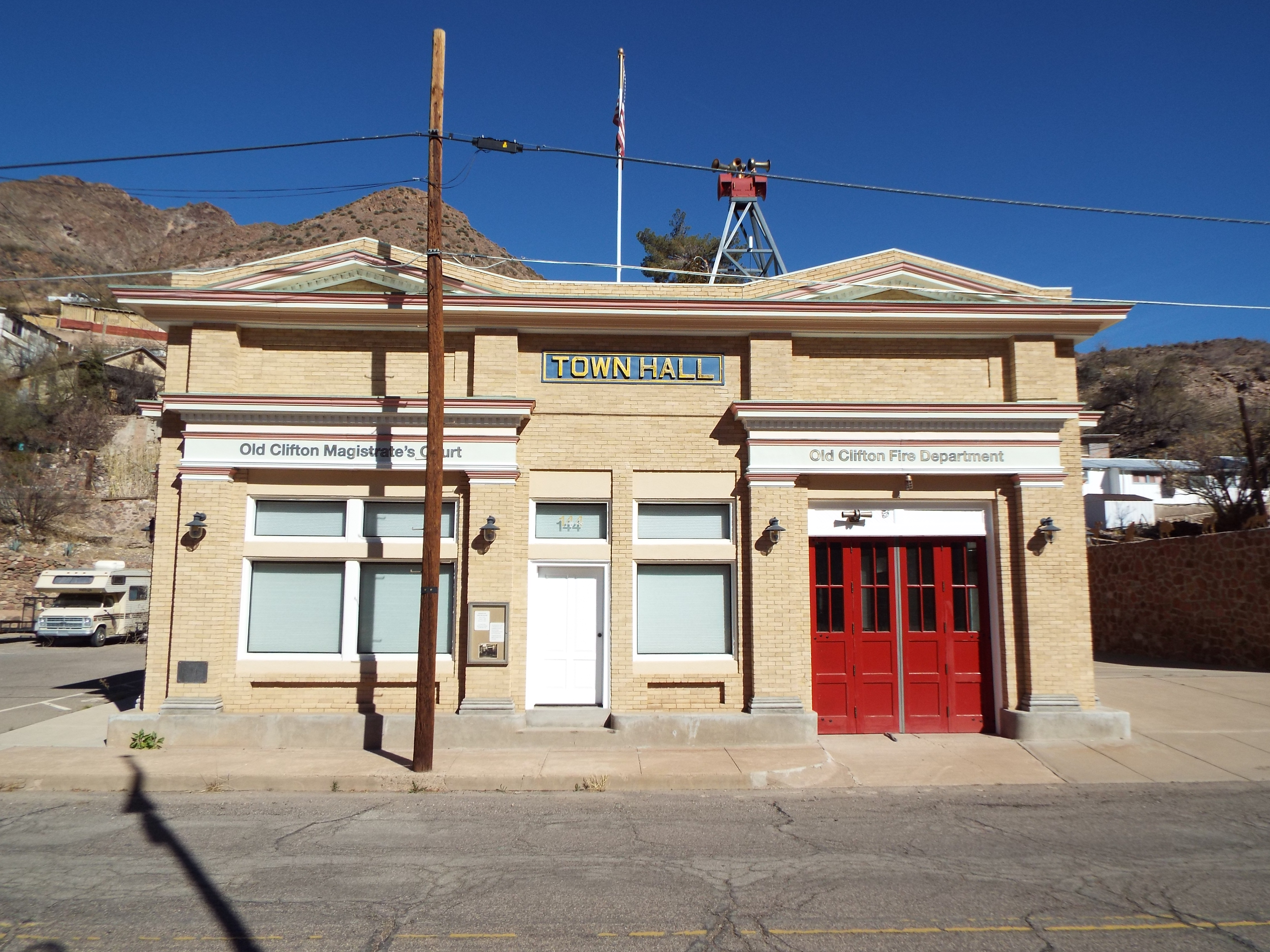
Town Hall – 1920

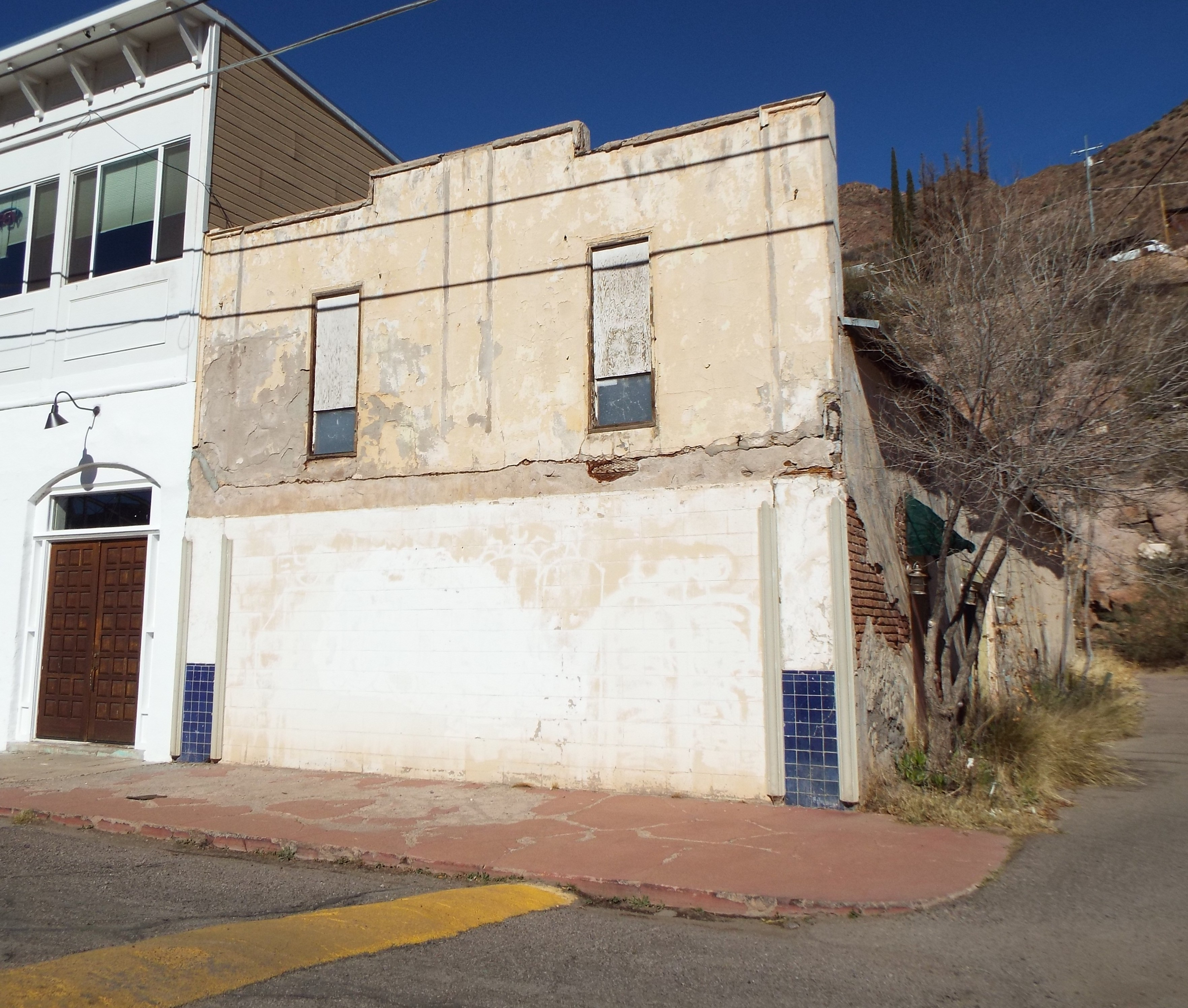
Clifton Amphitheater – 1913

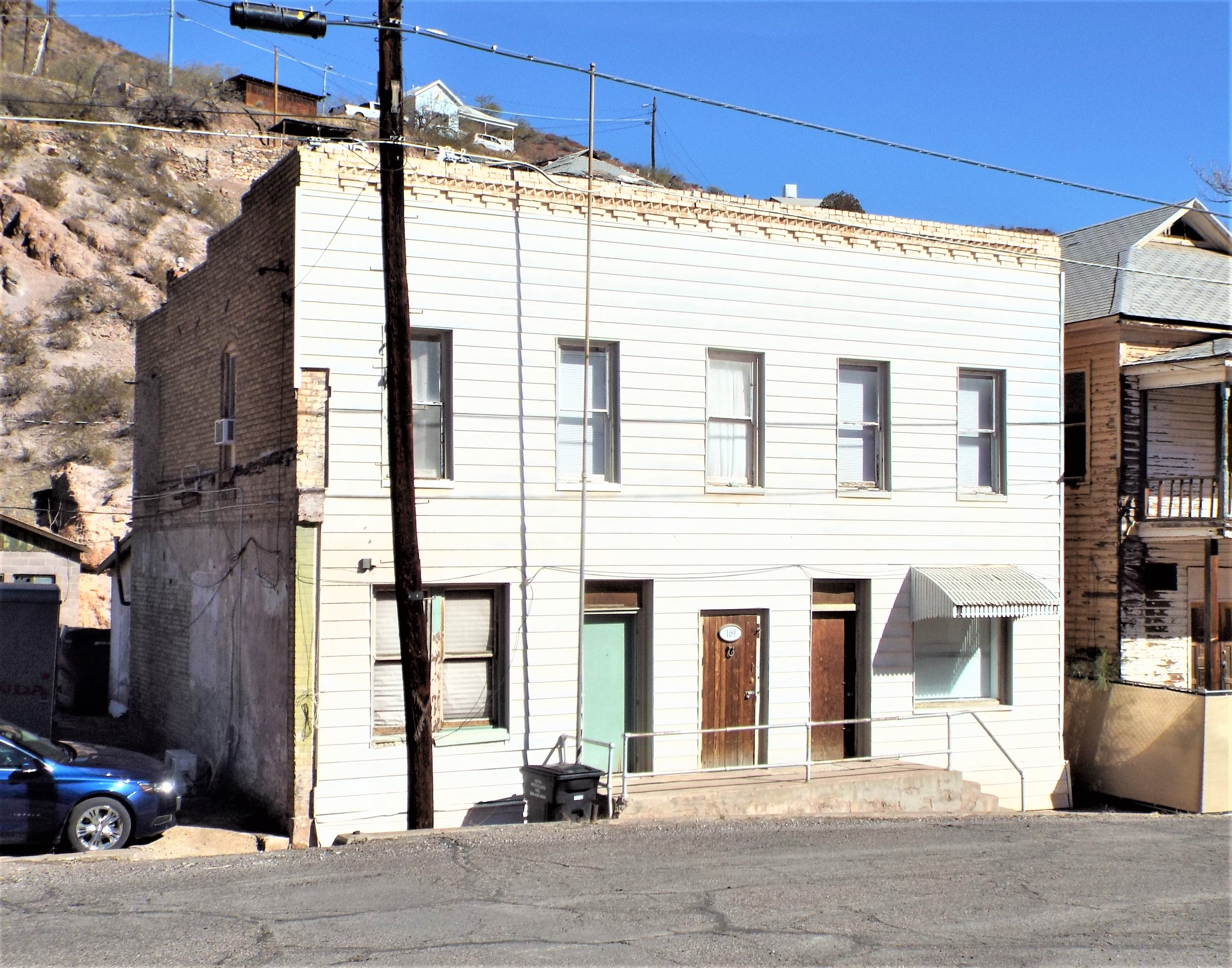
Hampton Block Building – 1890

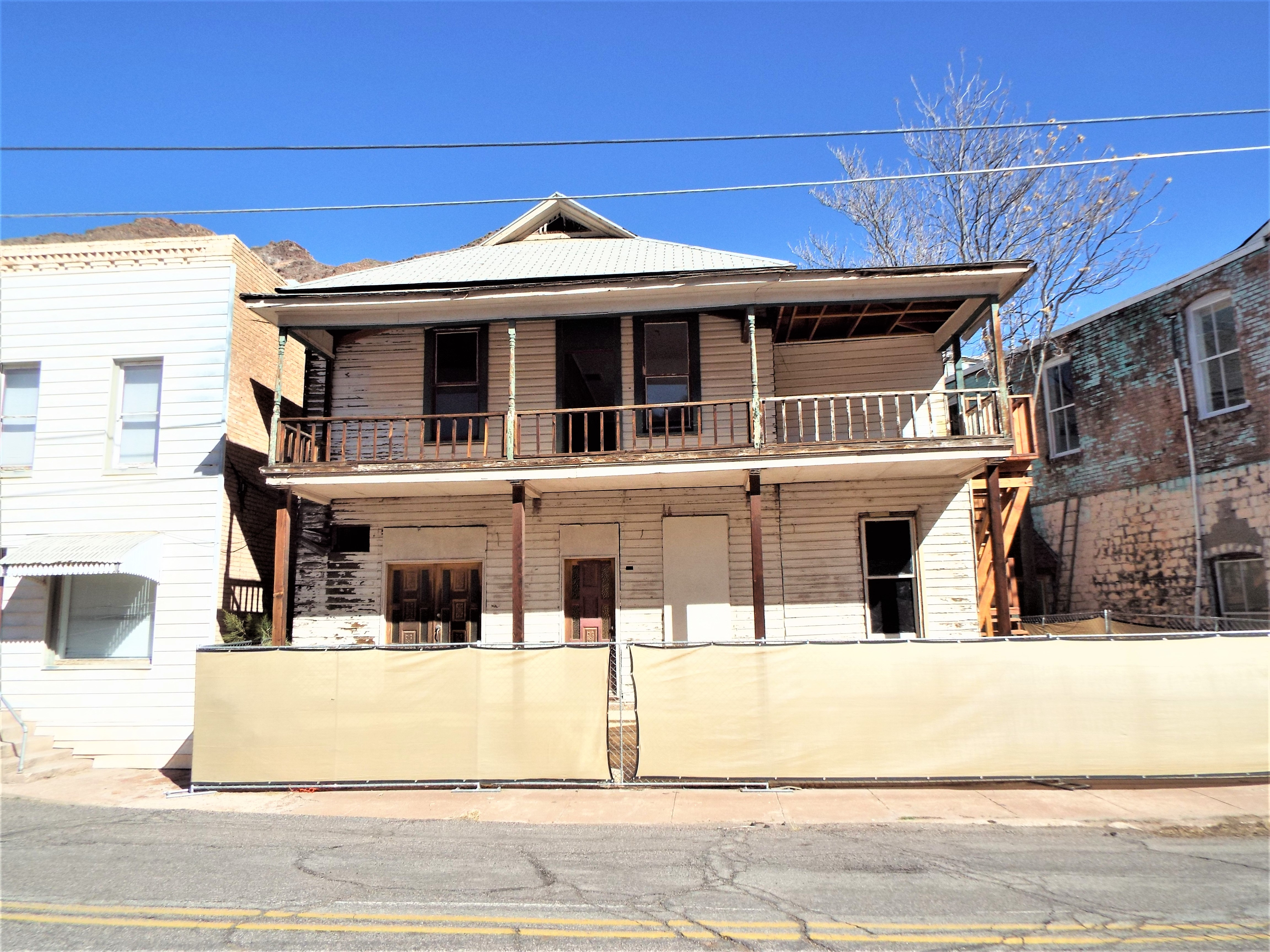
Pascoe Undertaking and Funeral Parlor – 1917

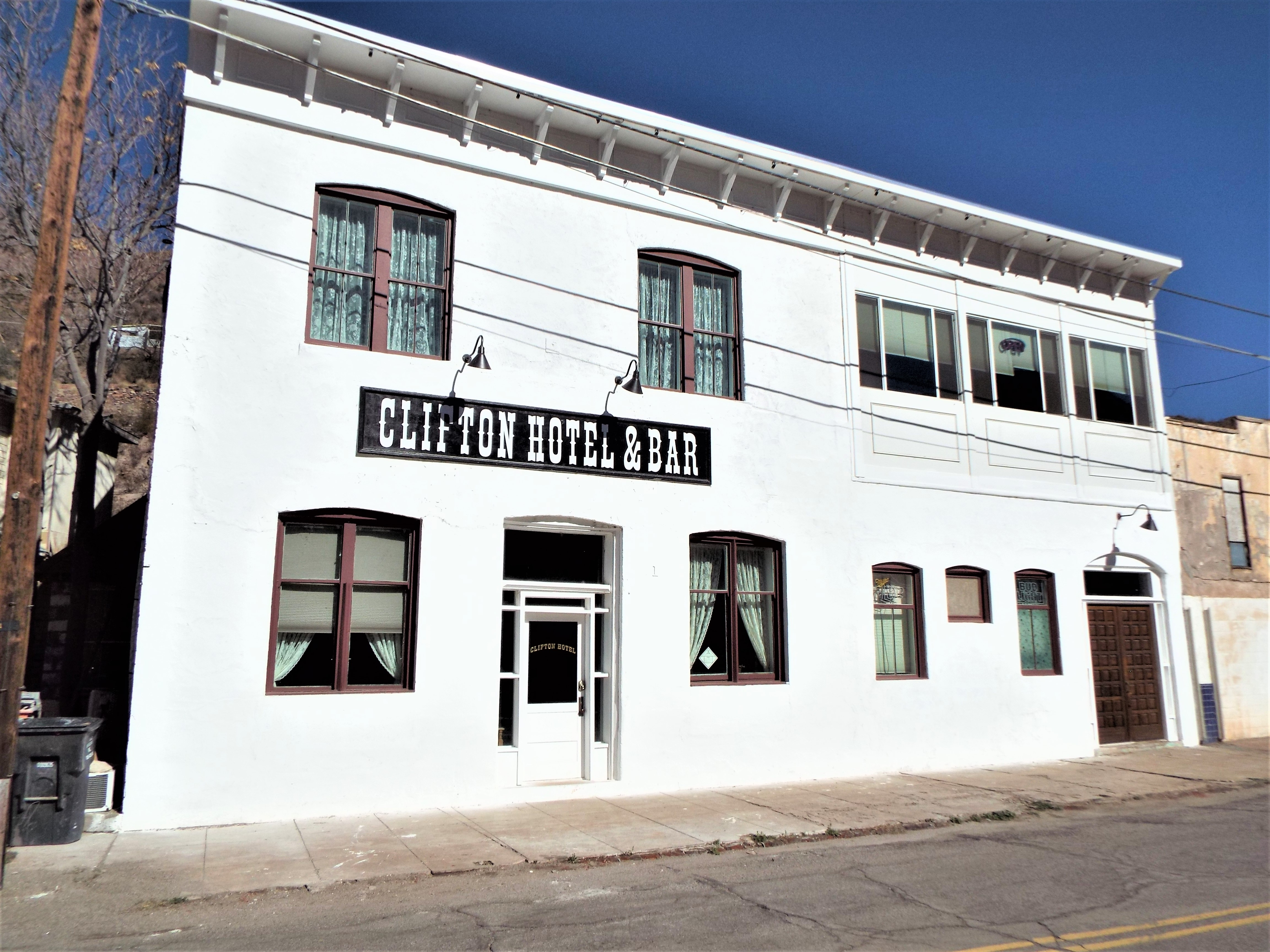
Clifton Hotel – 1881

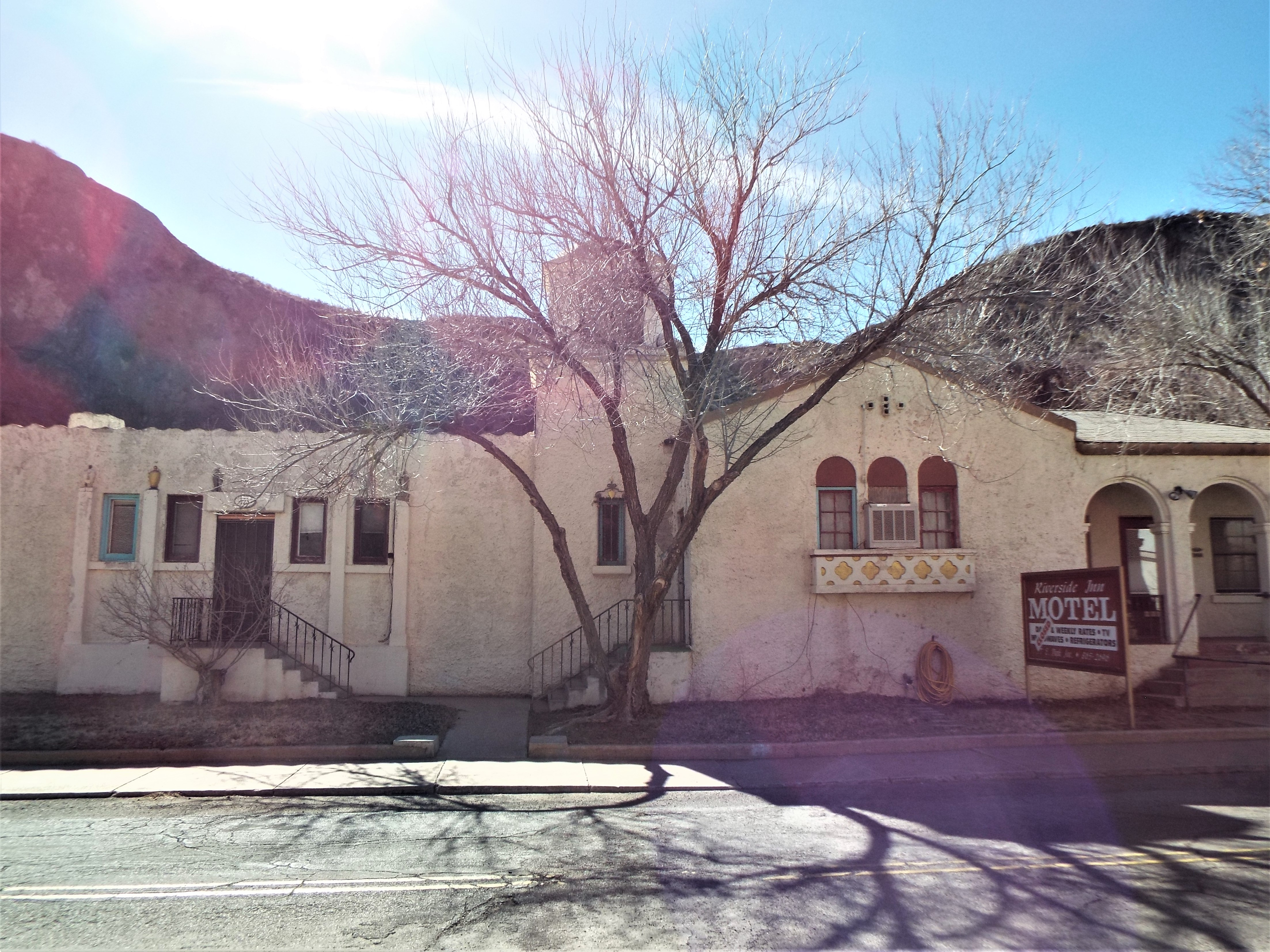
Clifton Hot Springs & Spa – 1929

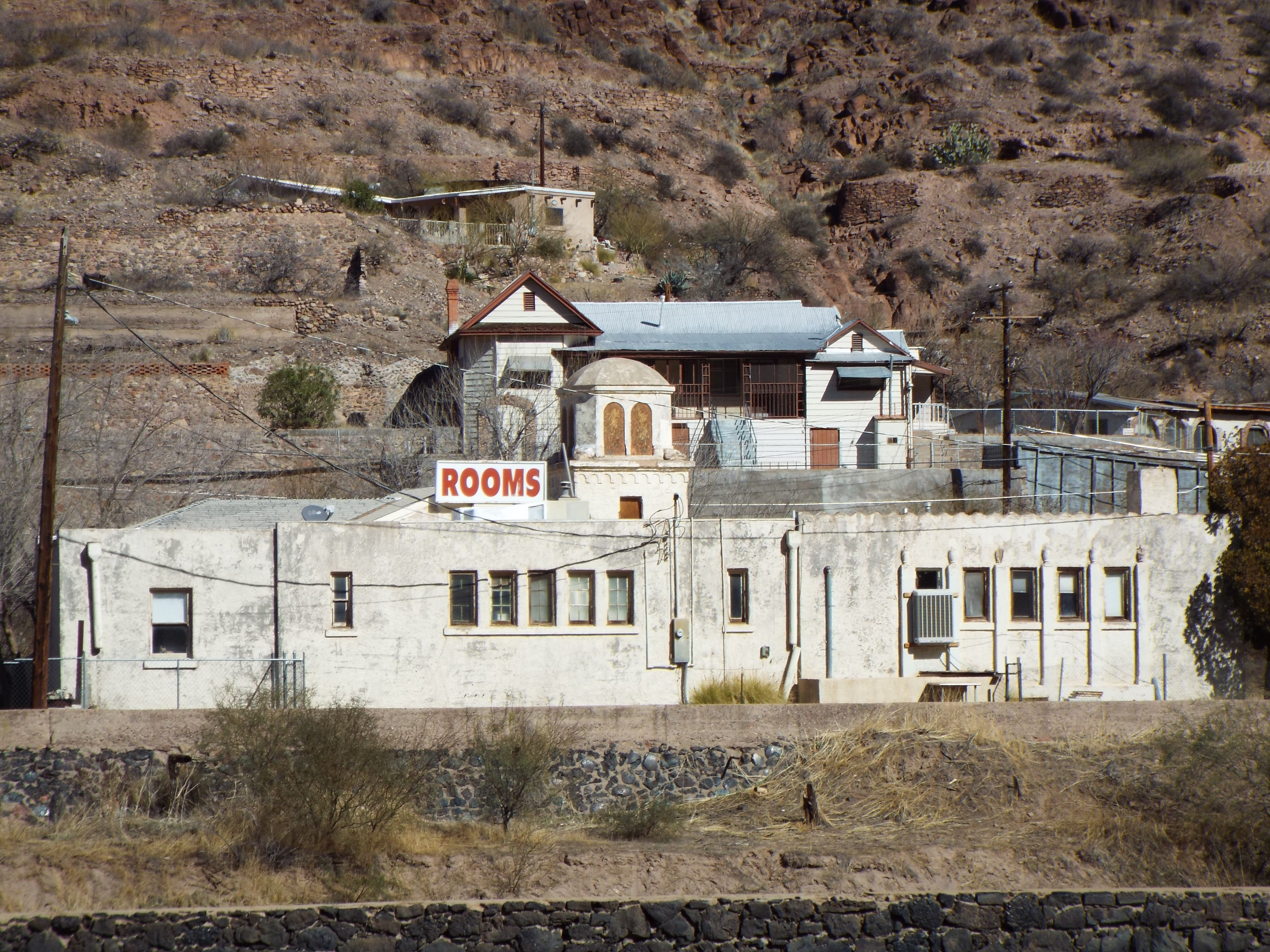
Rear view of the Clifton Hot Springs & Spa – 1929

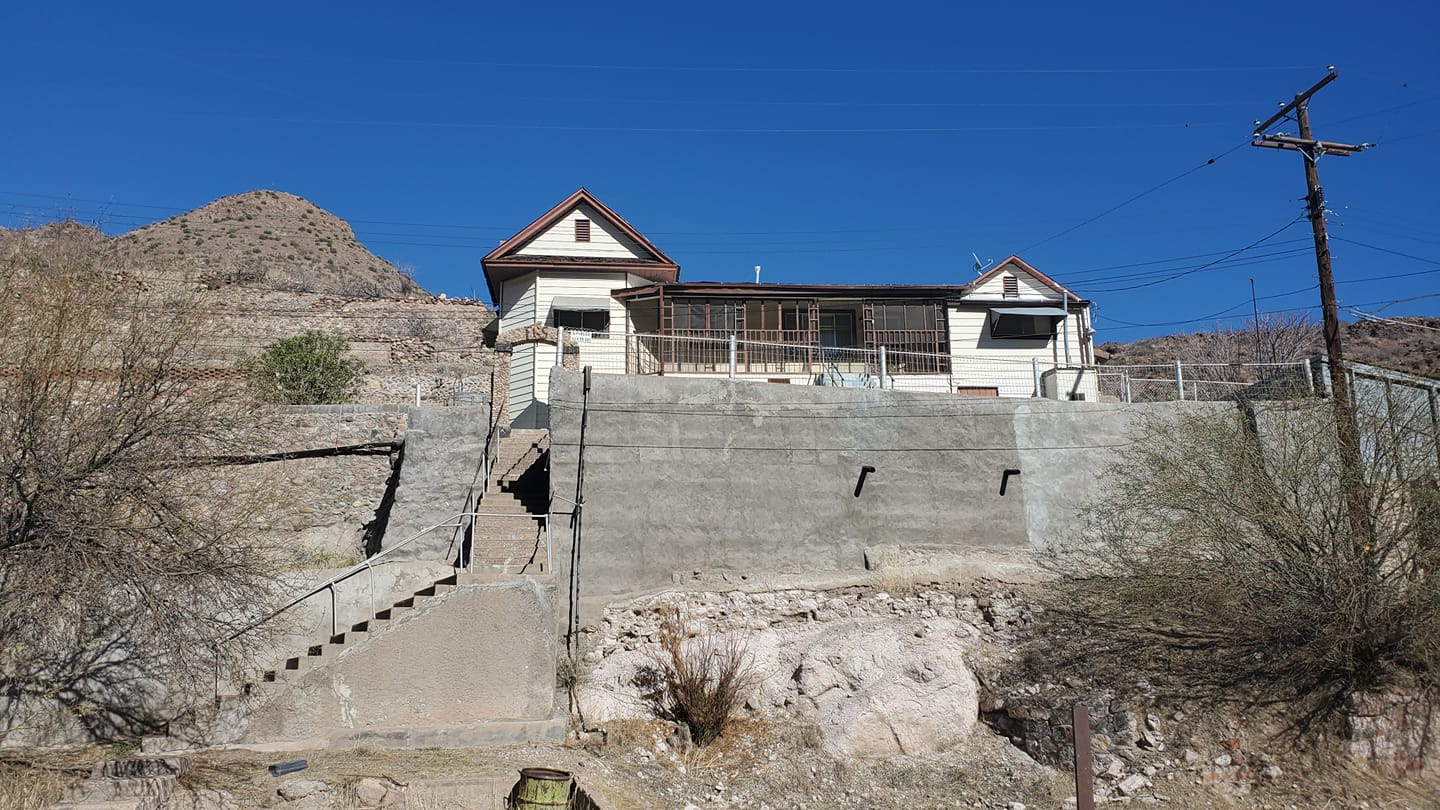
James Colquhoun House – 1900

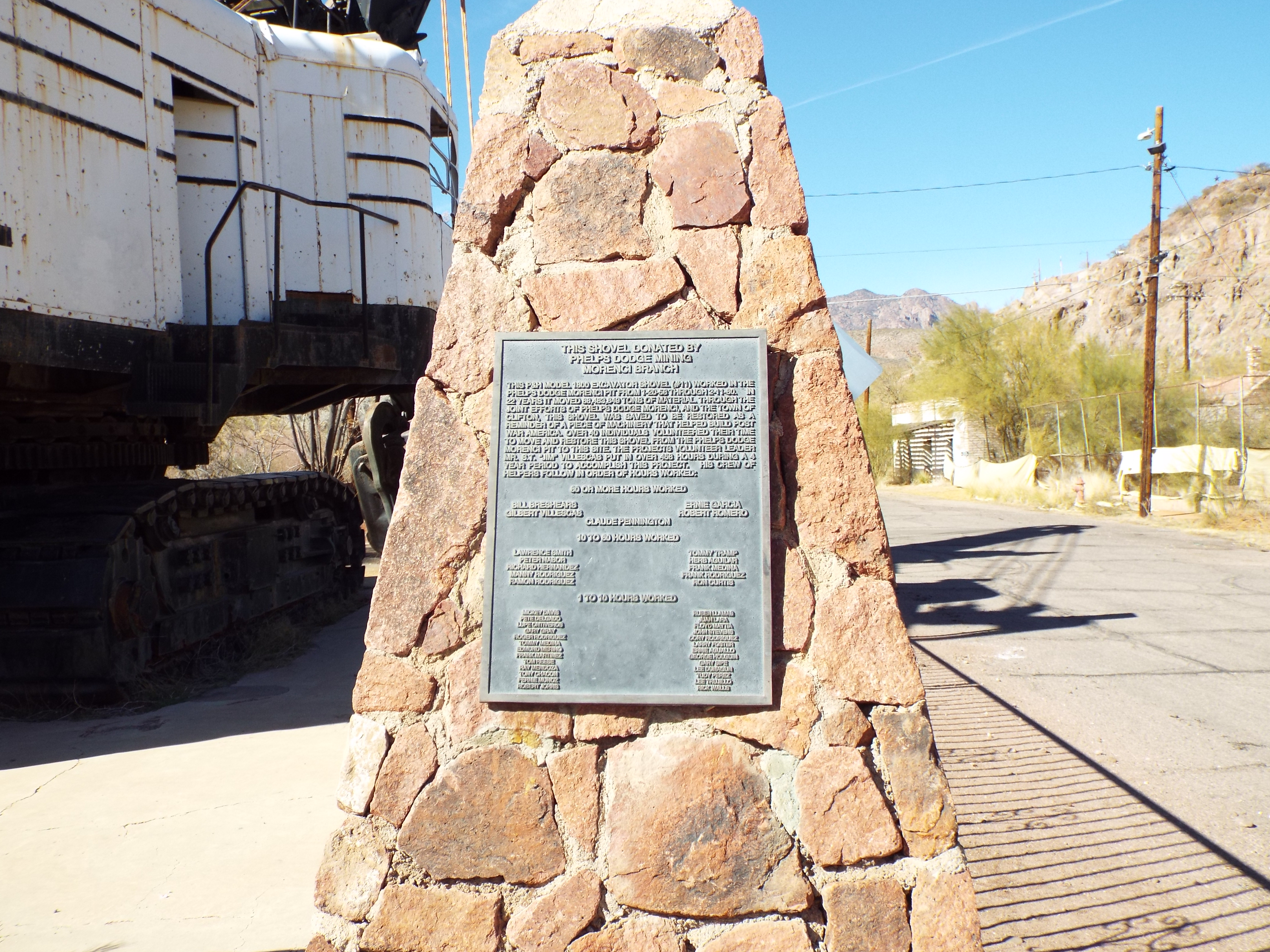
P & H Model 1800 Excavator Shovel #11 marker

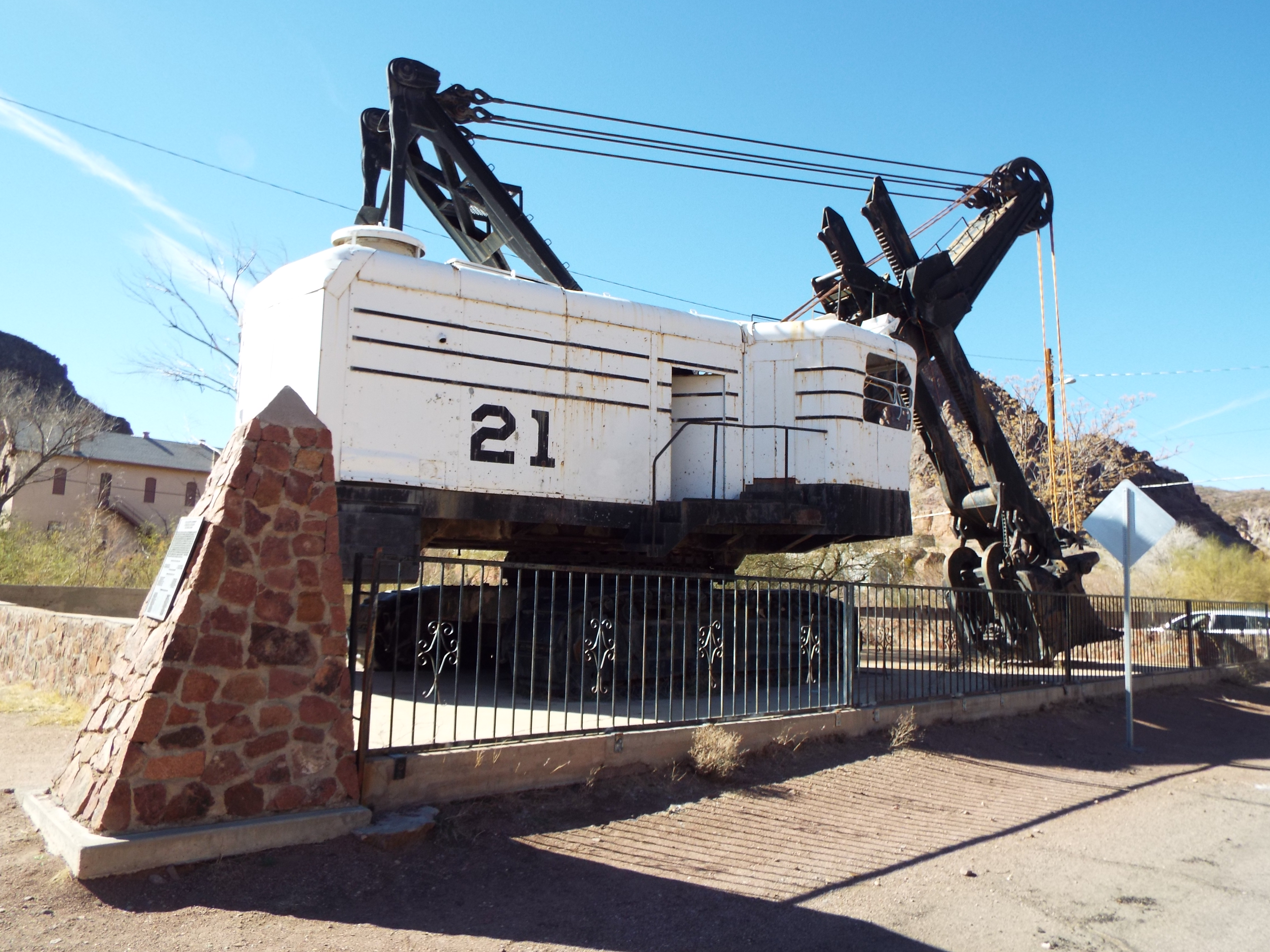
P & H Model 1800 Excavator Shovel #11 – built in 1959

=== Coronado Trail (Boulevard) ===
The following historic business structures are located in Coronado Trail, formerly route 666. The names posted are the original names used when first built and address.

- Flood Gates – The gates were built in the early 1990s to protect South Clifton from flooding,
- Clifton Railroad Depot – built in 1913 – 100 N. Coronado Trail. The depot now serves as Clifton's Visitor Center.
- People Bank and Trust – built in 1917 – 213 (247–249) Coronado Trail – The lower floor of this building currently serves as the Greenlee County Democratic Party Headquarters.
- Arizona Copper Company Offices – built in 1904 – Coronado Trail.
- Old House – built in 1910 – 544 S. Coronado Trail
- Hotel Reardon – built in 1913 – 202 S Coronado Trail.
Historic Coronado Trail

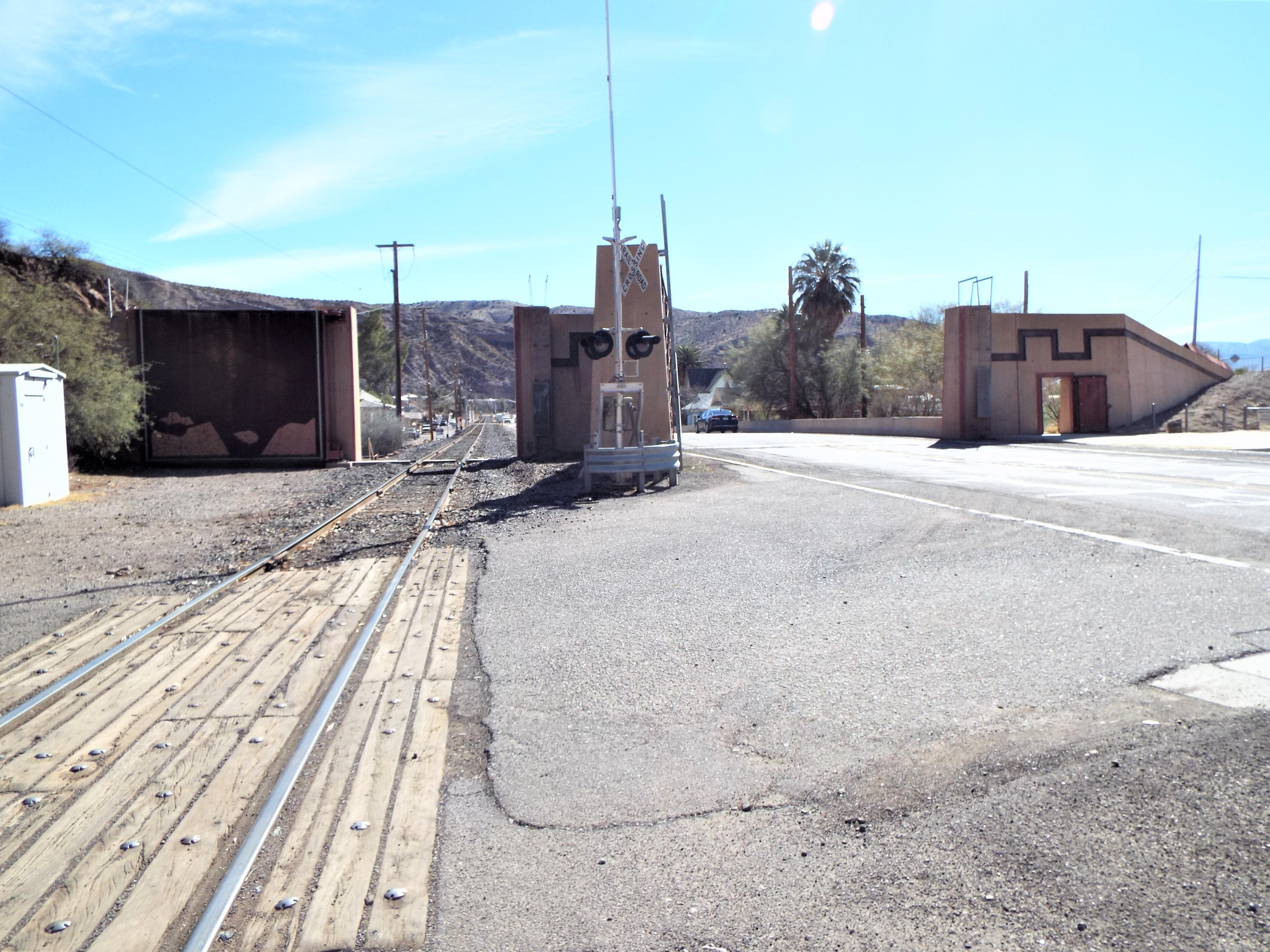
Flood Gates

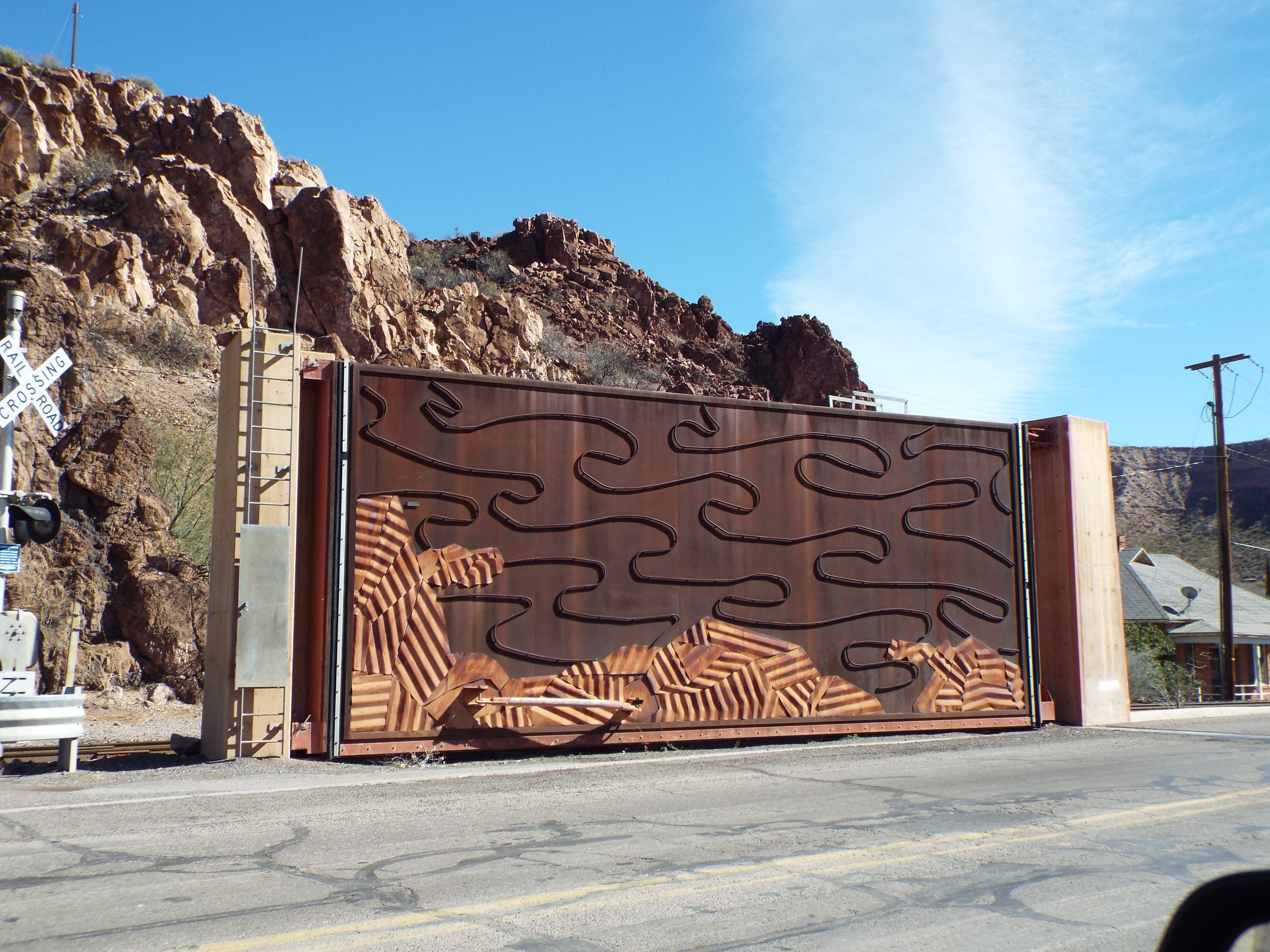
Flood Gates

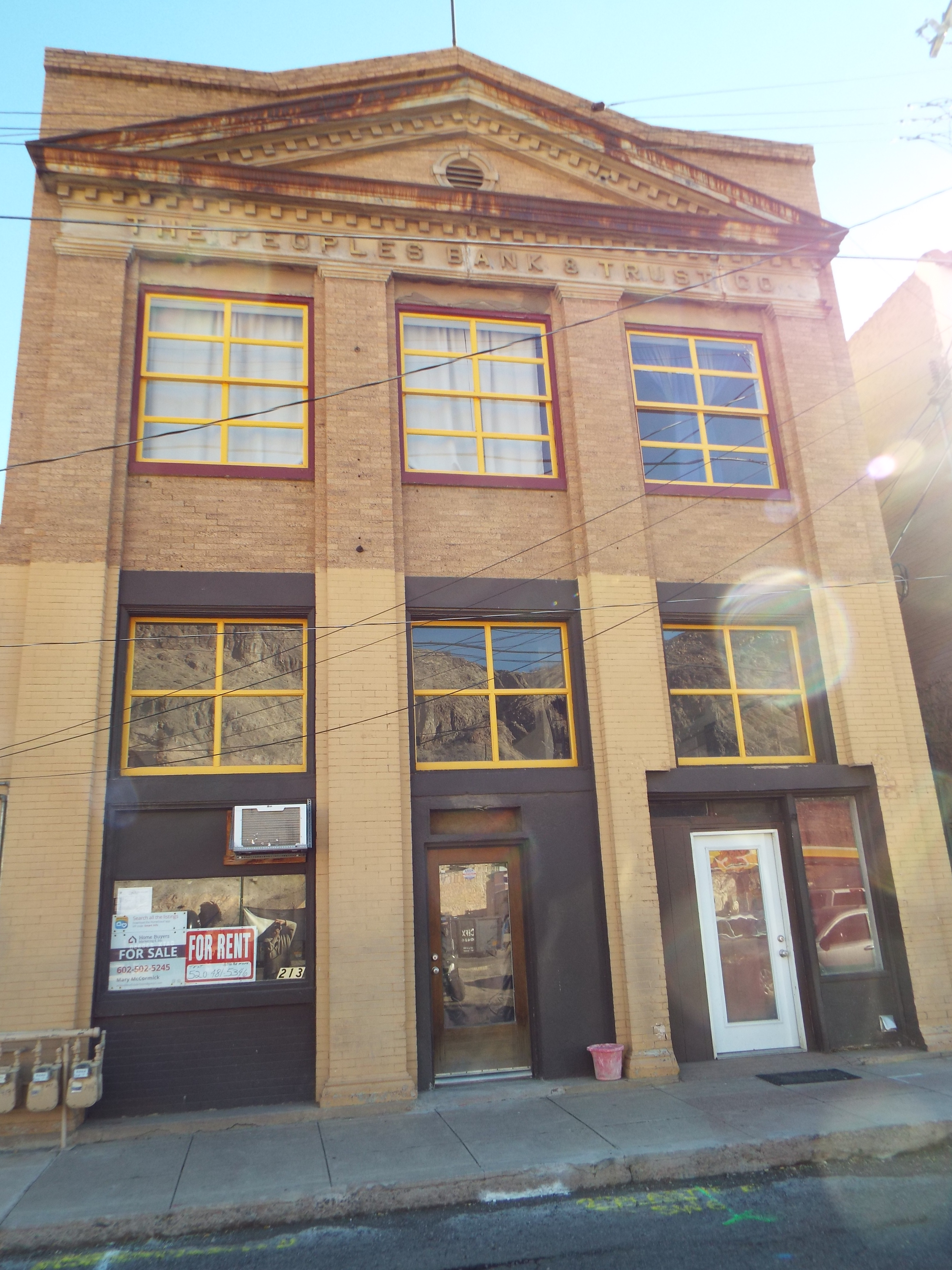
People Bank and Trust – 1917

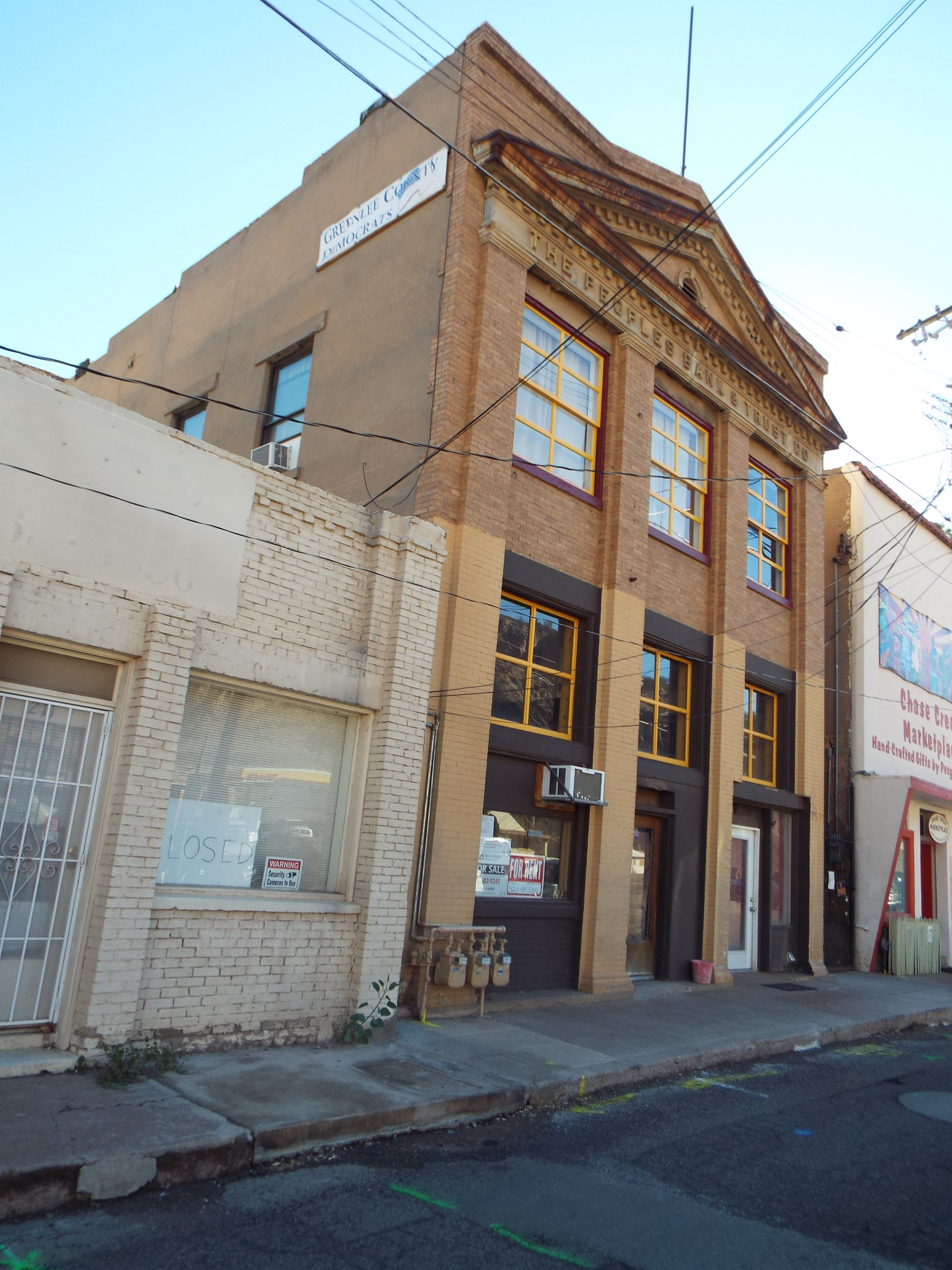
People Bank and Trust

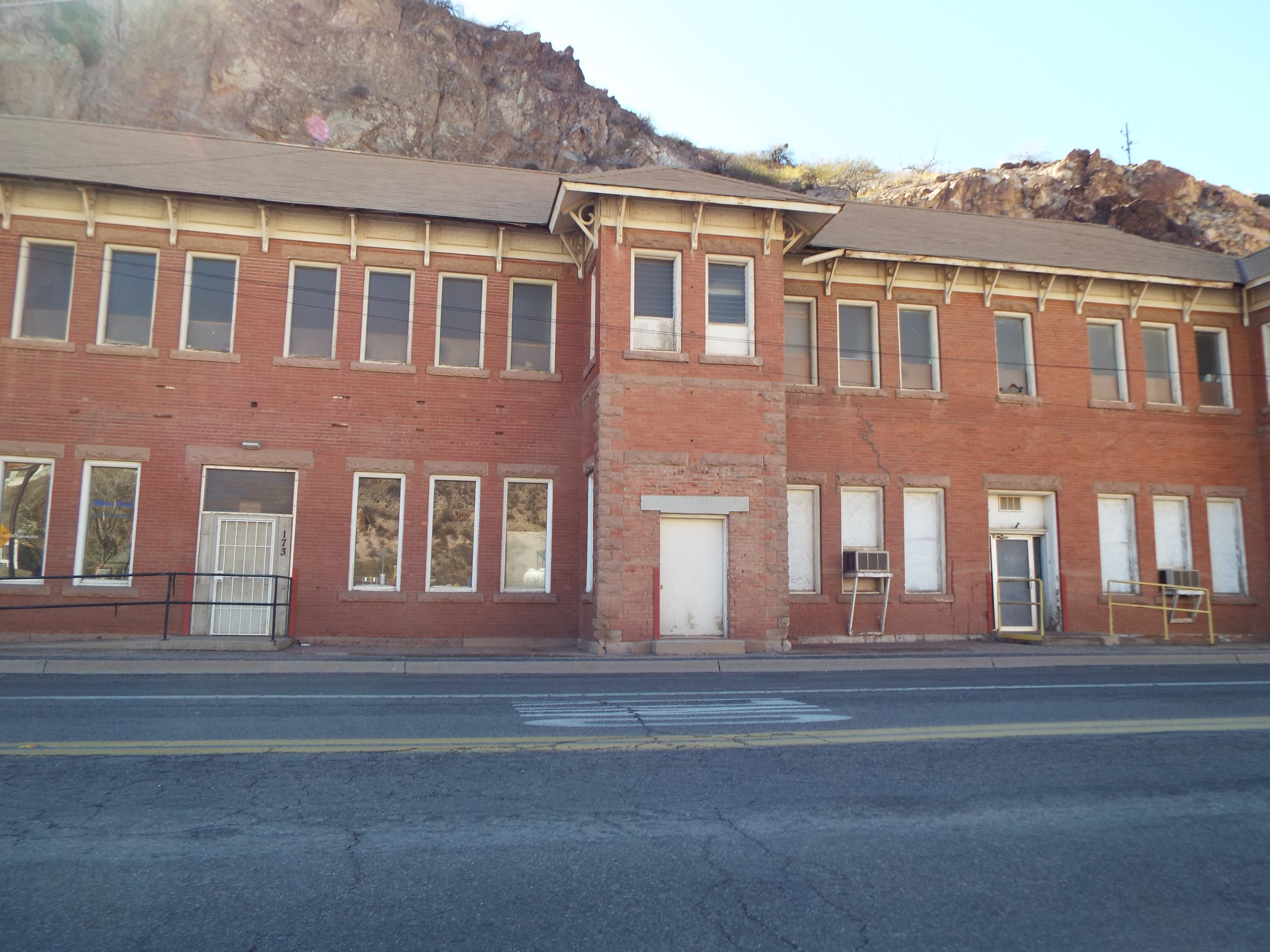
Arizona Copper Company Offices – 1904

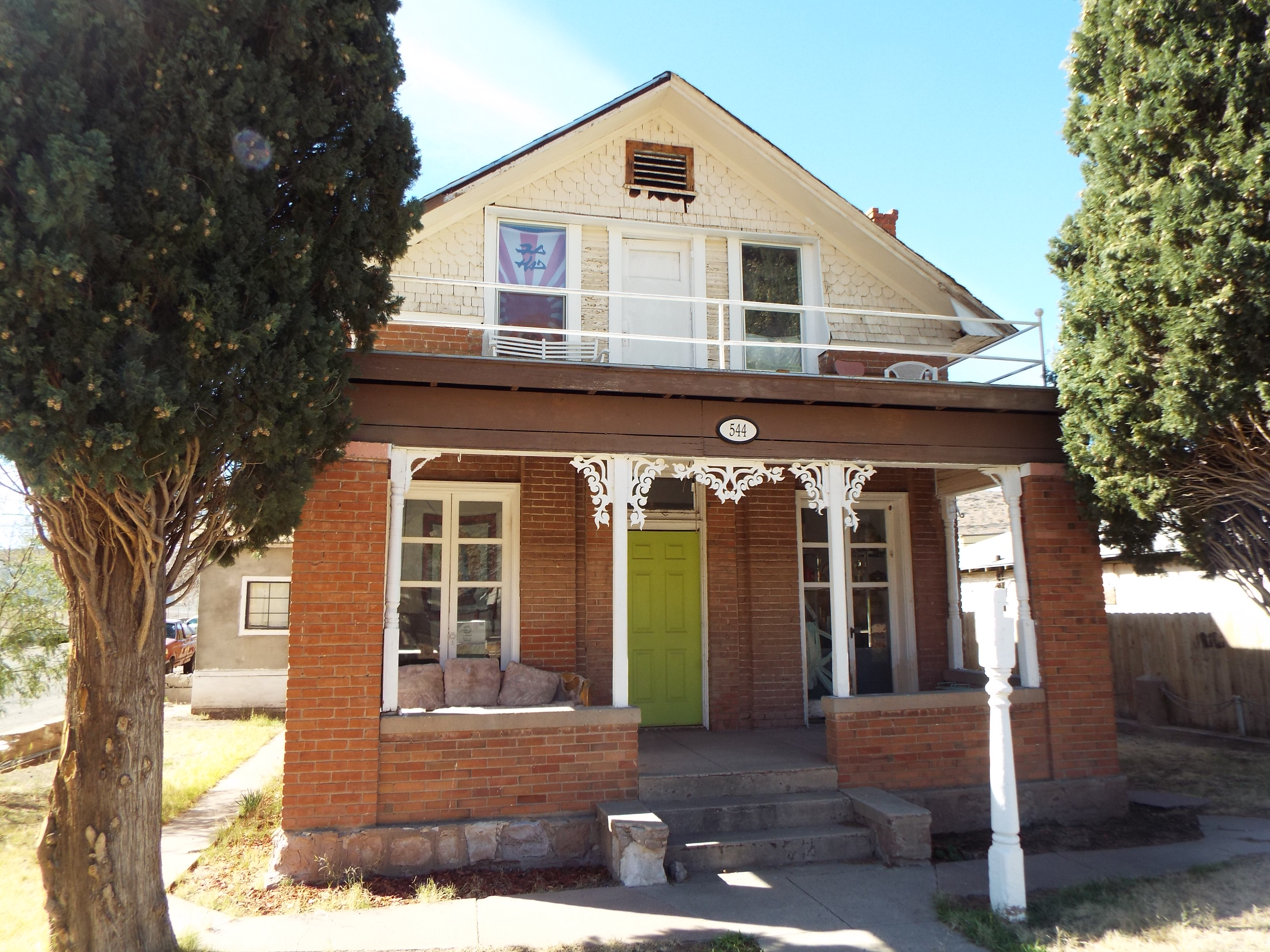
Old House – 1910

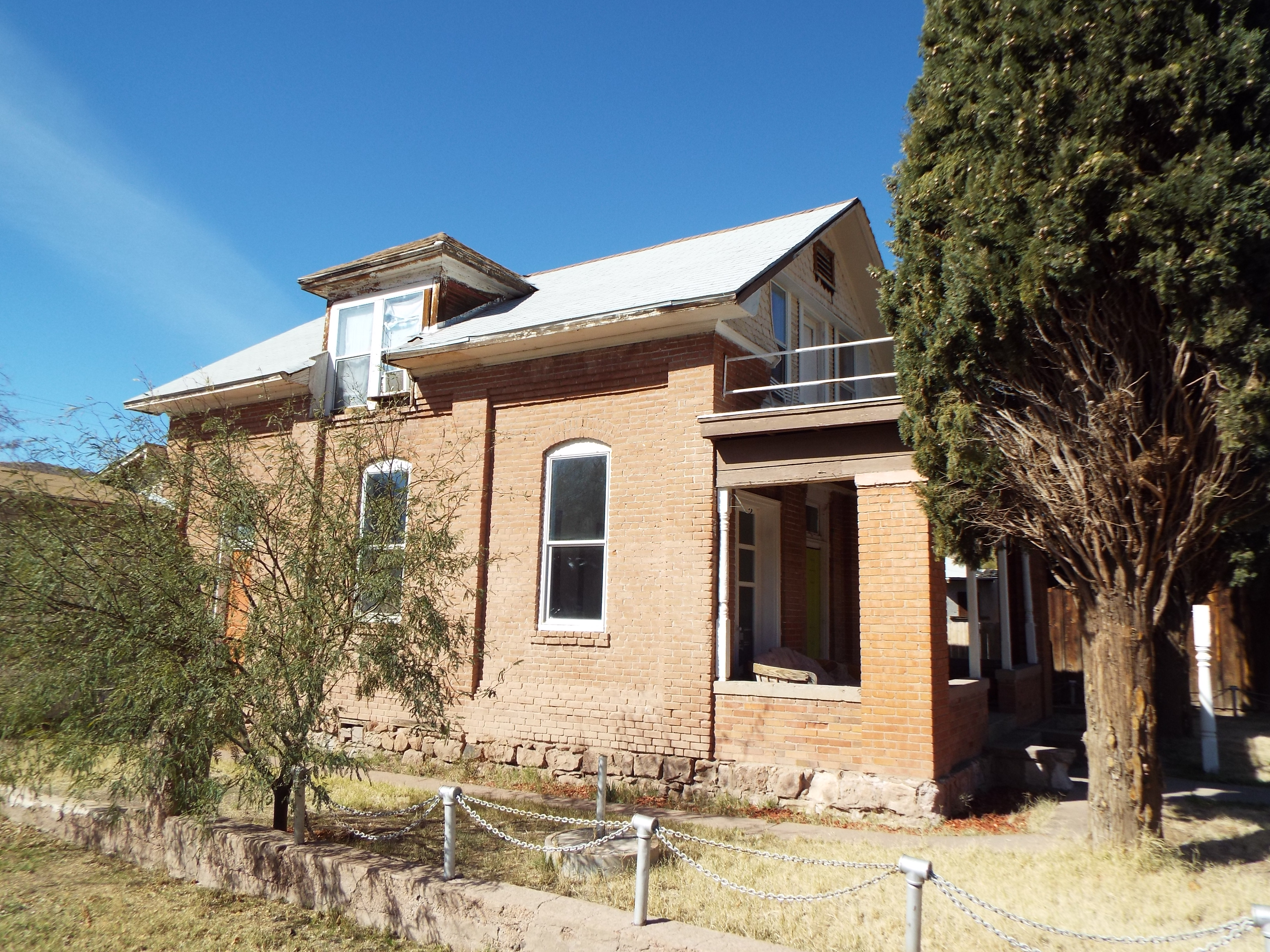
Different view of the Old House – 1910

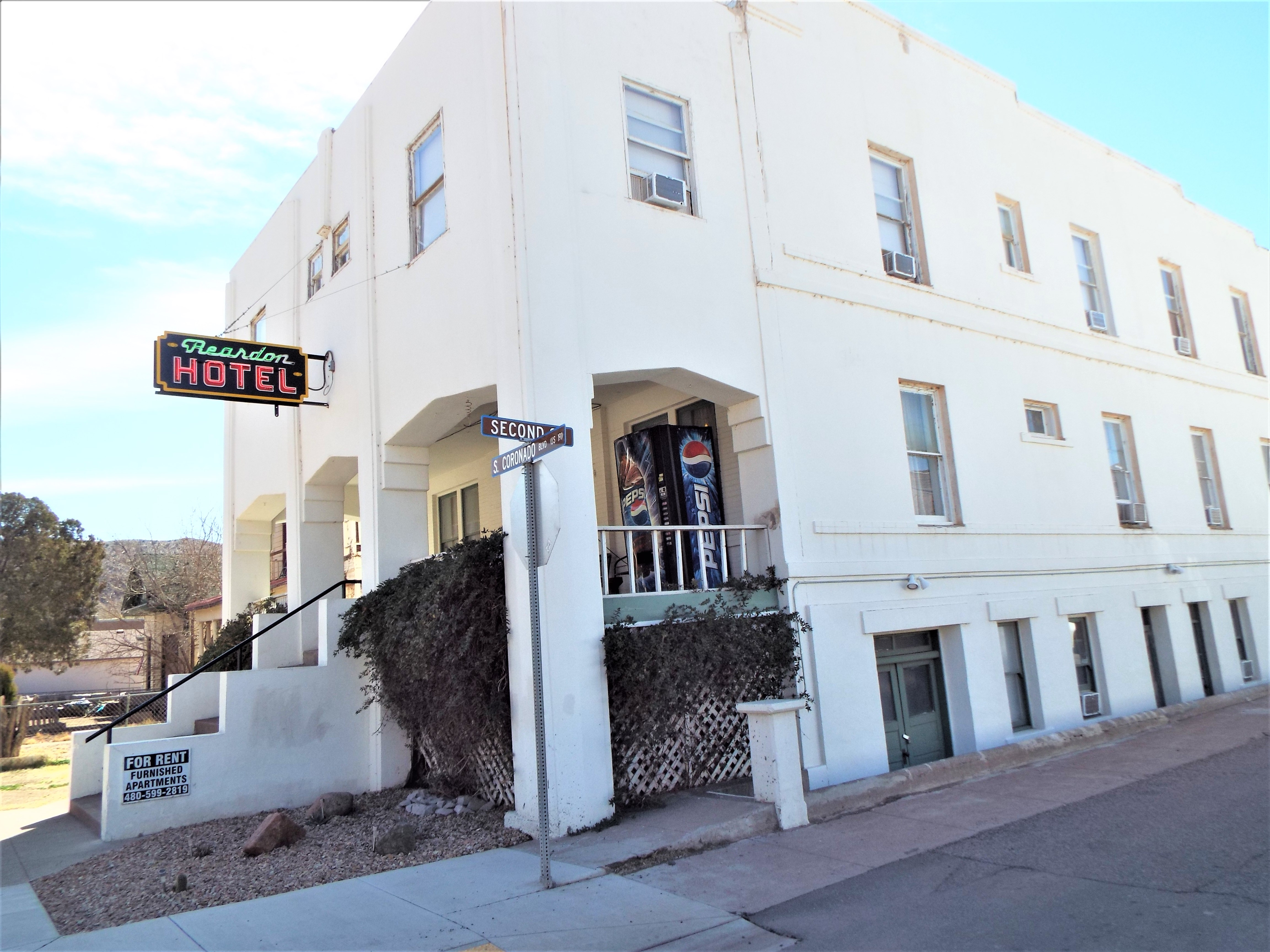
Hotel Reardon – 1913

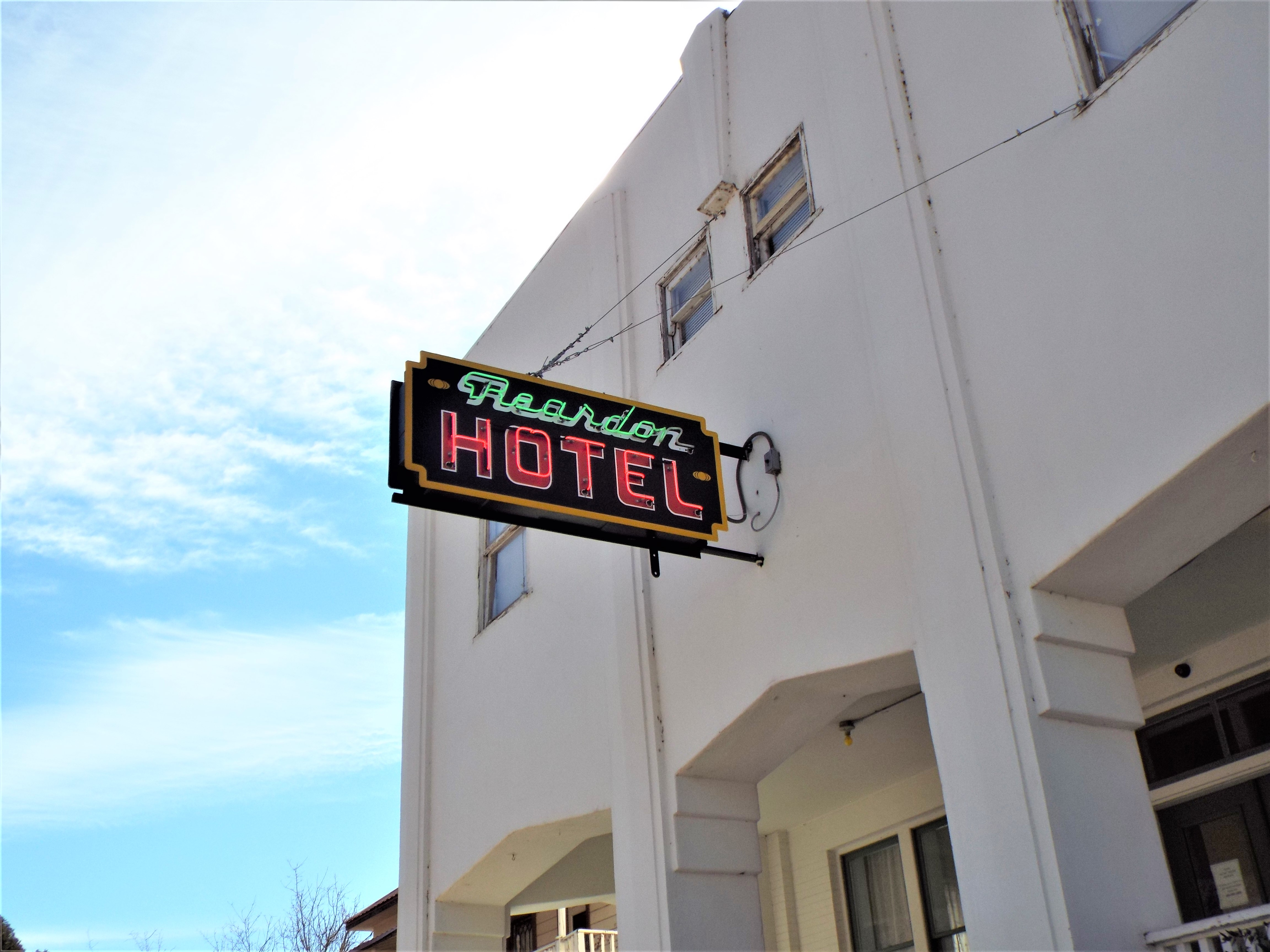
Hotel Reardon sign
Historic Clifton Railroad Depot

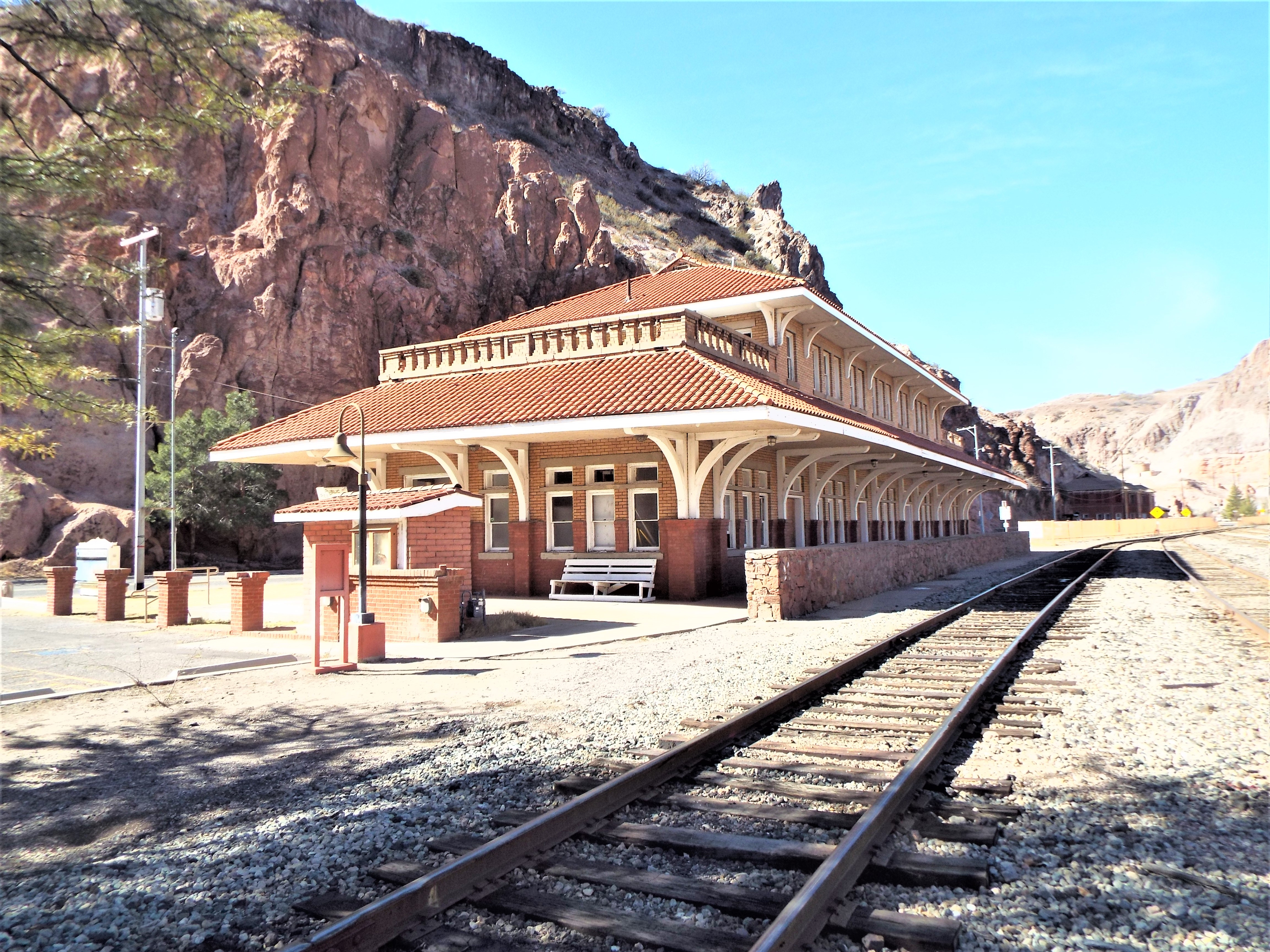
Clifton Railroad Depot

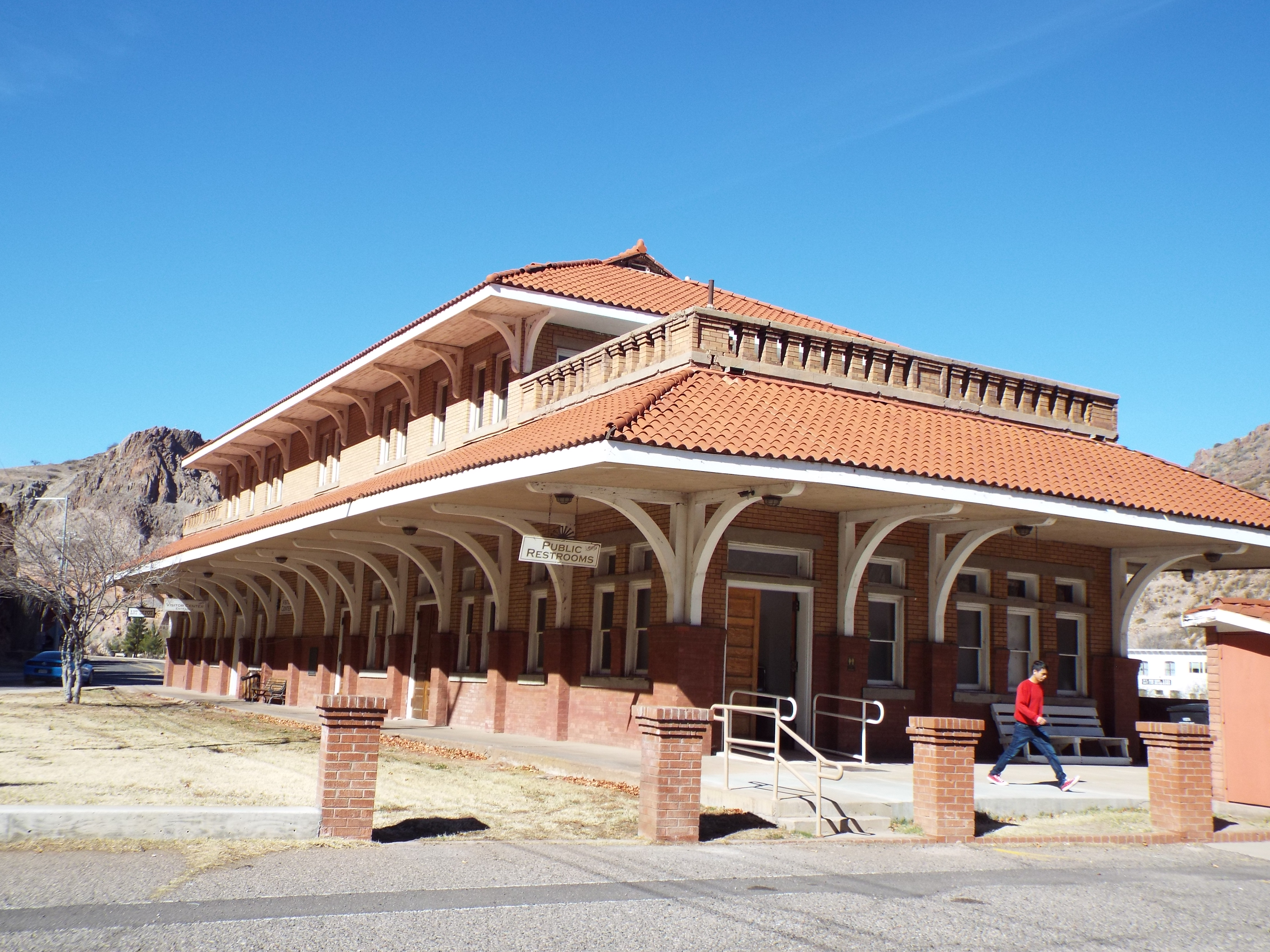
Clifton Railroad Depot – 1913

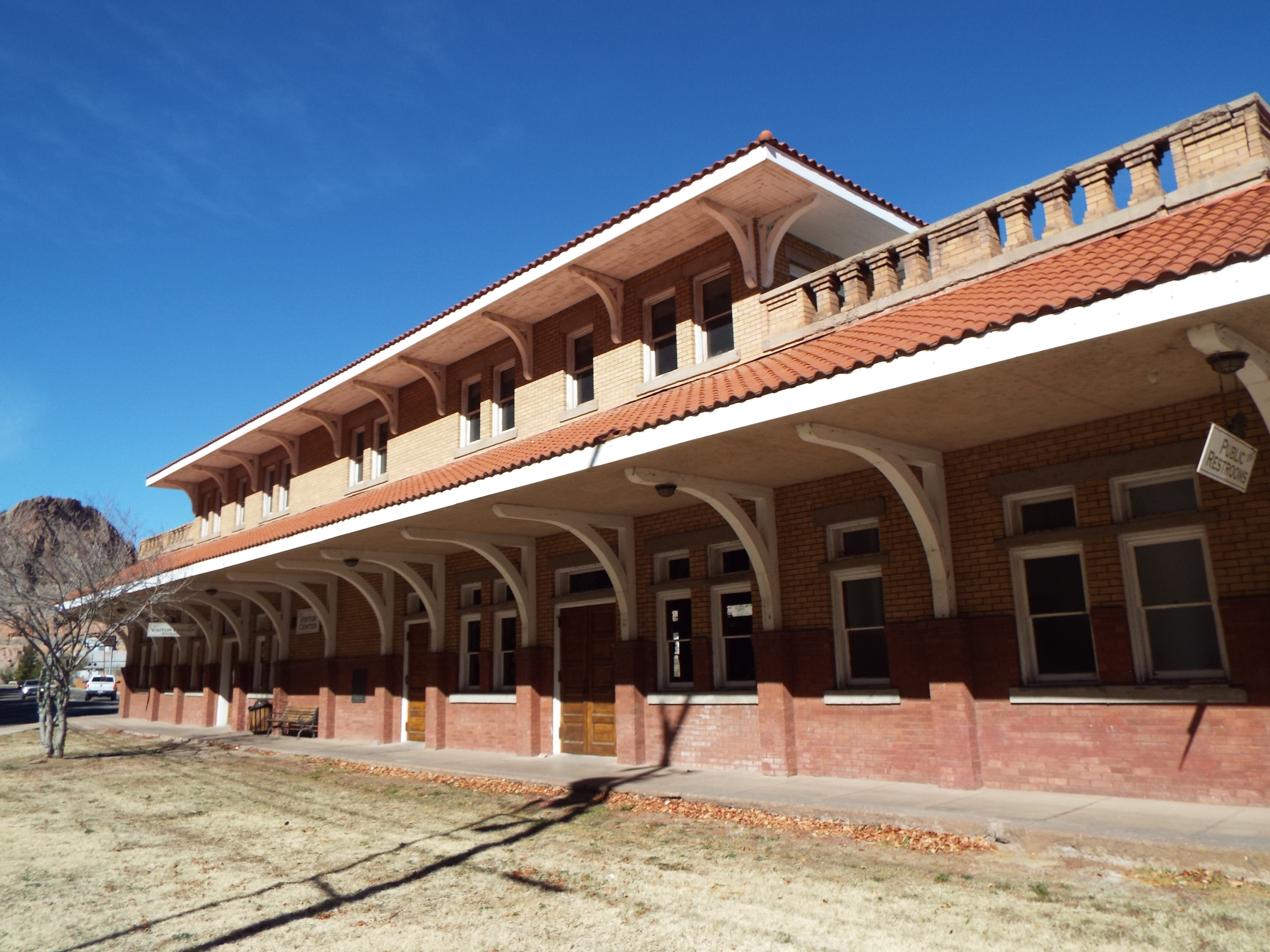
Clifton Railroad Depot – 1913

=== Other buildings and veterans memorial ===
Pictured are some the other historical buildings and Mares Bluff Veterans Memorial Flags

- Greenlee County Courthouse – built in 1912 – 223 5th St.
- Greenlee County Jail – built in 1912 – 223 5th St.
- Clifton High School Sports Complex – built in 1917 – 249 Leonard St. This building has a tennis court and a full-sized gym with tongue and groove hardwood floors and ceiling.
- Clifton Grocery Store – built in 1900 – 211 Hill Street
- Storage and Livery – built in 1890 – Hill Street
- Old Arizona Copper Co. Smelter Power House – built in 1897 on Frisco Ave. The old powerhouse is a contributing resource to the Clifton Townsite Historic District (NRHP District No. 90000339), which was added to the National Historic Register in 1990.
- Mares Bluff Veterans Memorial Flags – The memorial site in South Clifton. The memorial includes more than 2,000 replica dog tags representing combat and non-combat veterans from World War I, World War II, Korea, Vietnam, Afghanistan and Iraq and those who served in peace time.
Other historic buildings

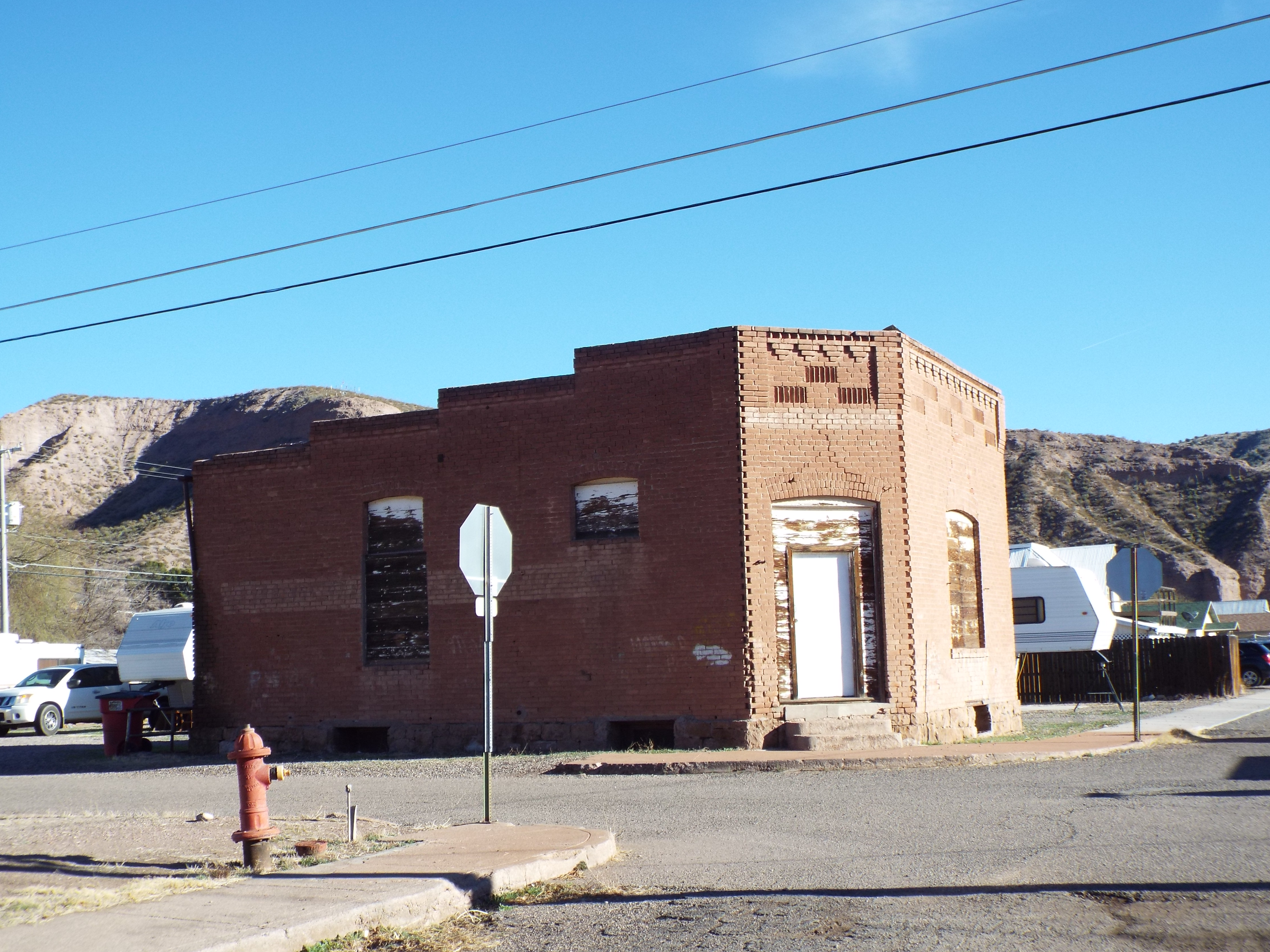
Clifton Grocery Store

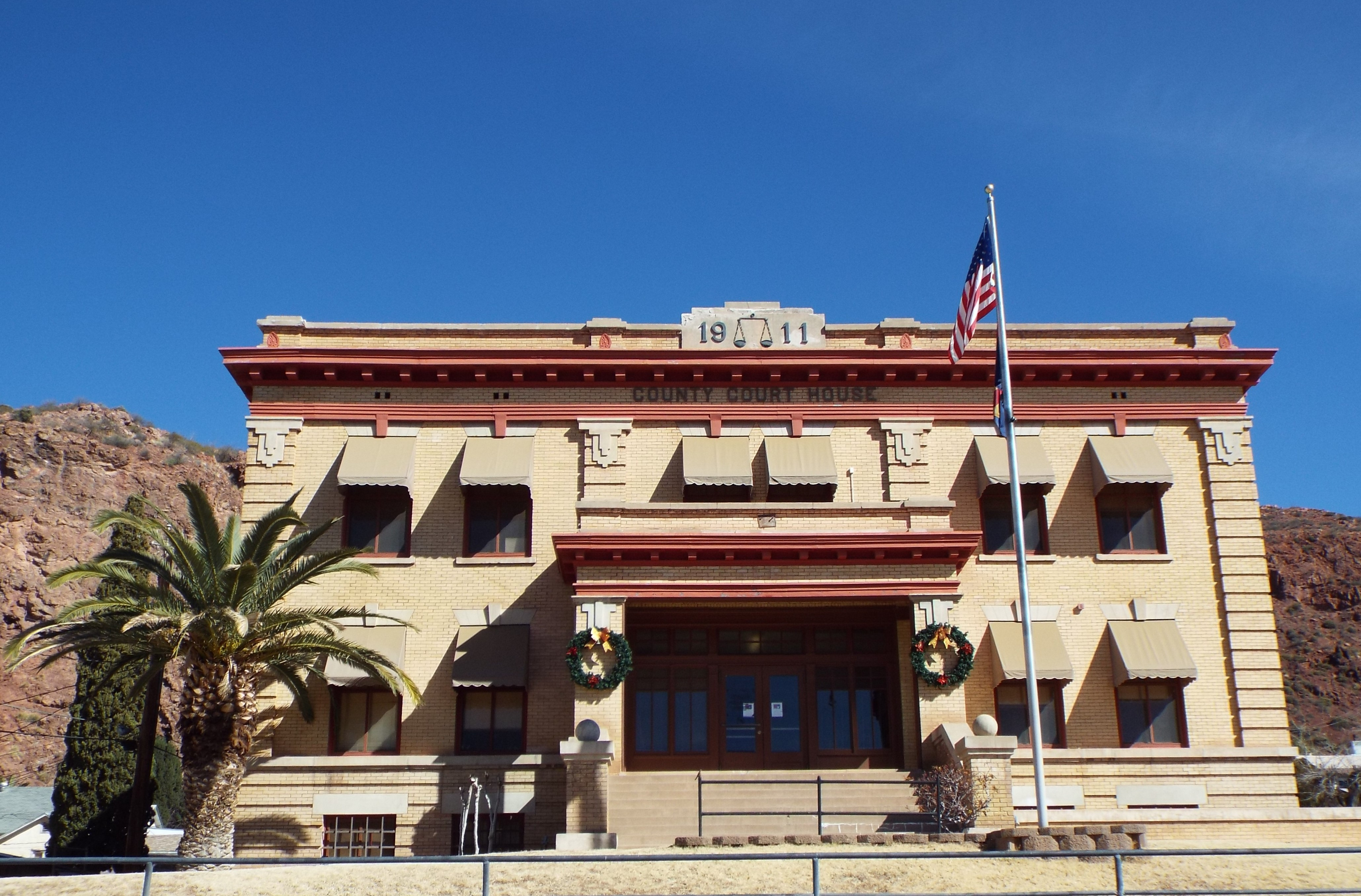
Greenlee County Courthouse – 1912

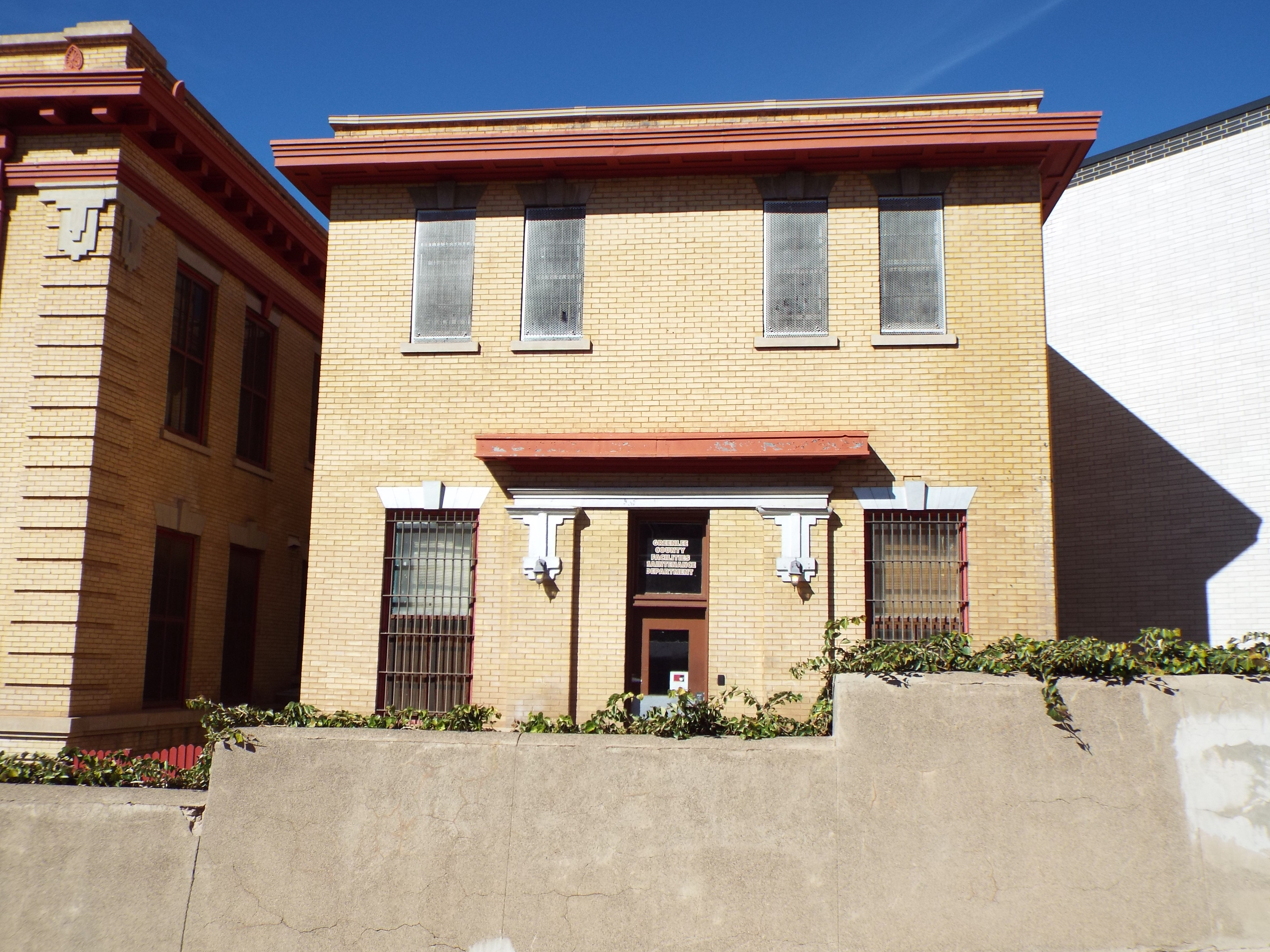
Greenlee County Jail – 1912

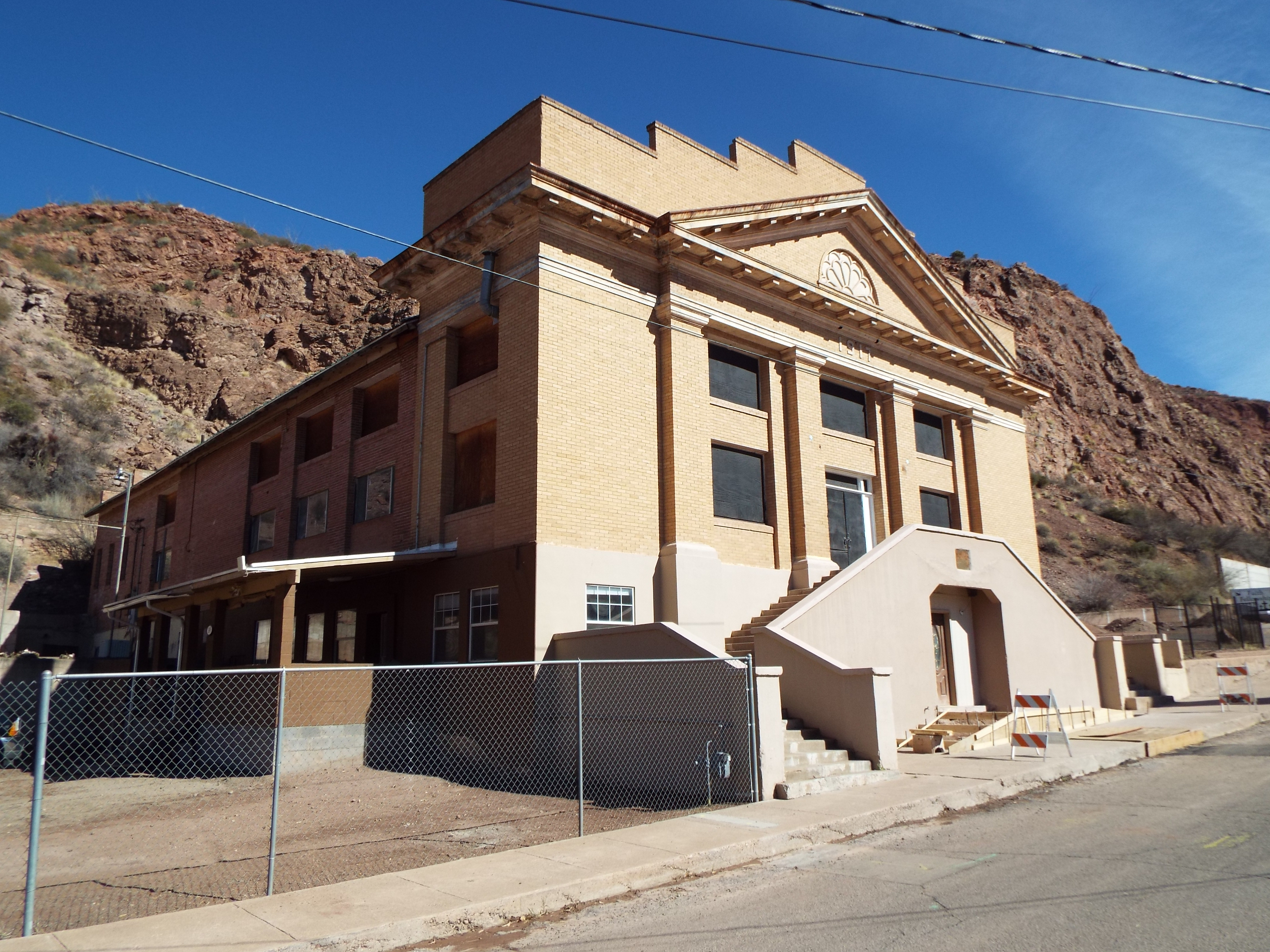
Clifton High School Sports Complex – 1917

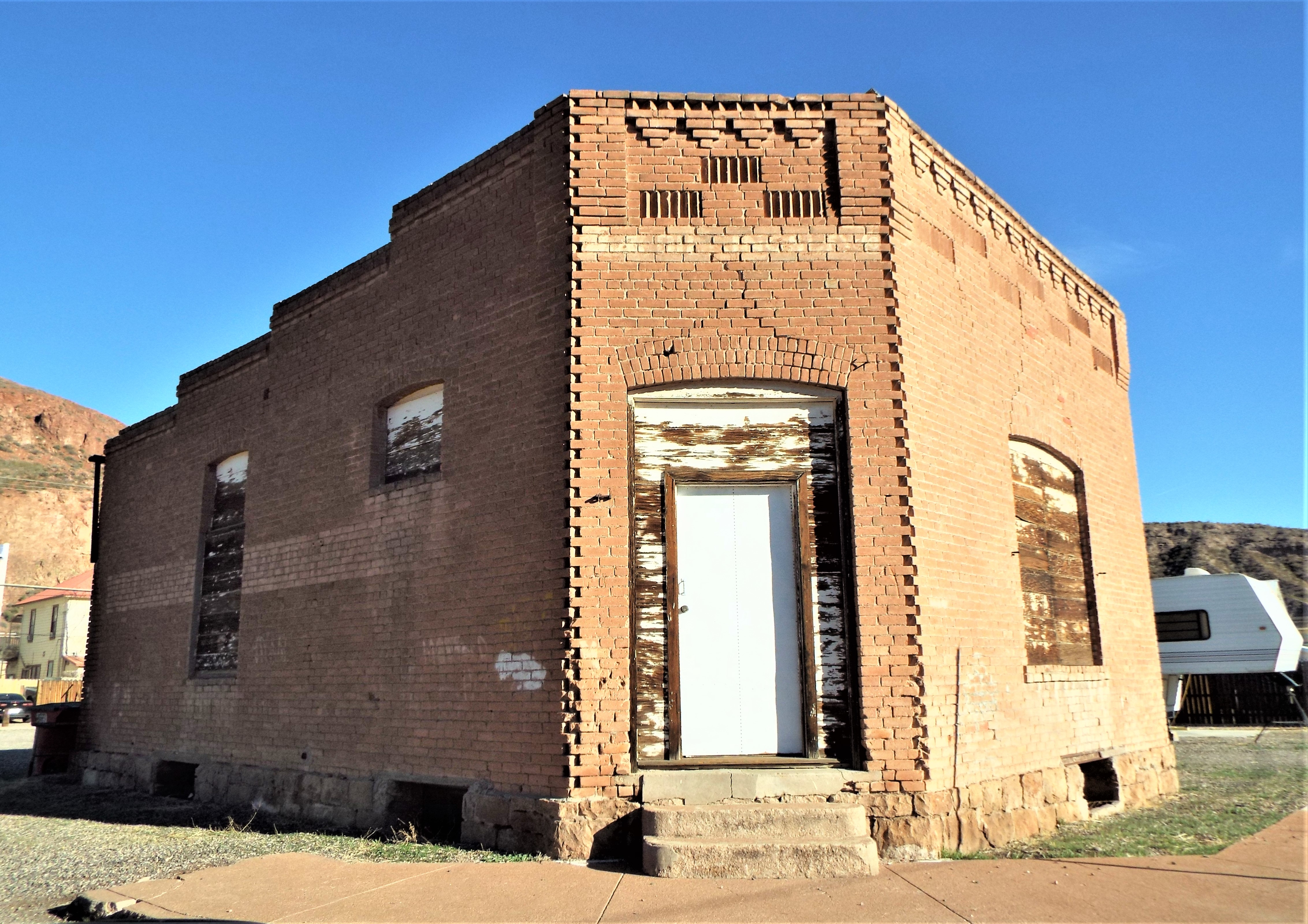
Clifton Grocery Store – 1900

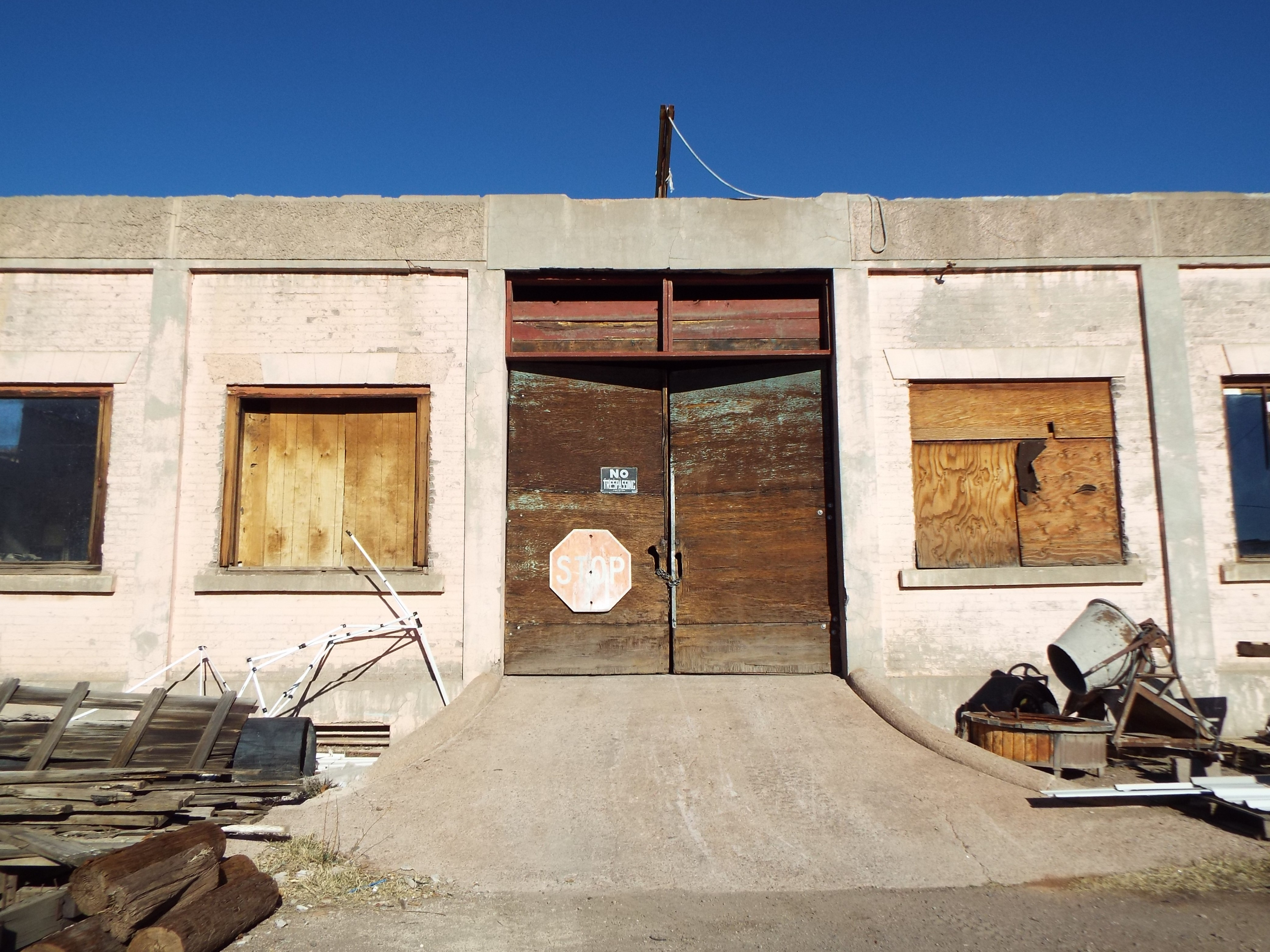
Storage and Livery – 1890

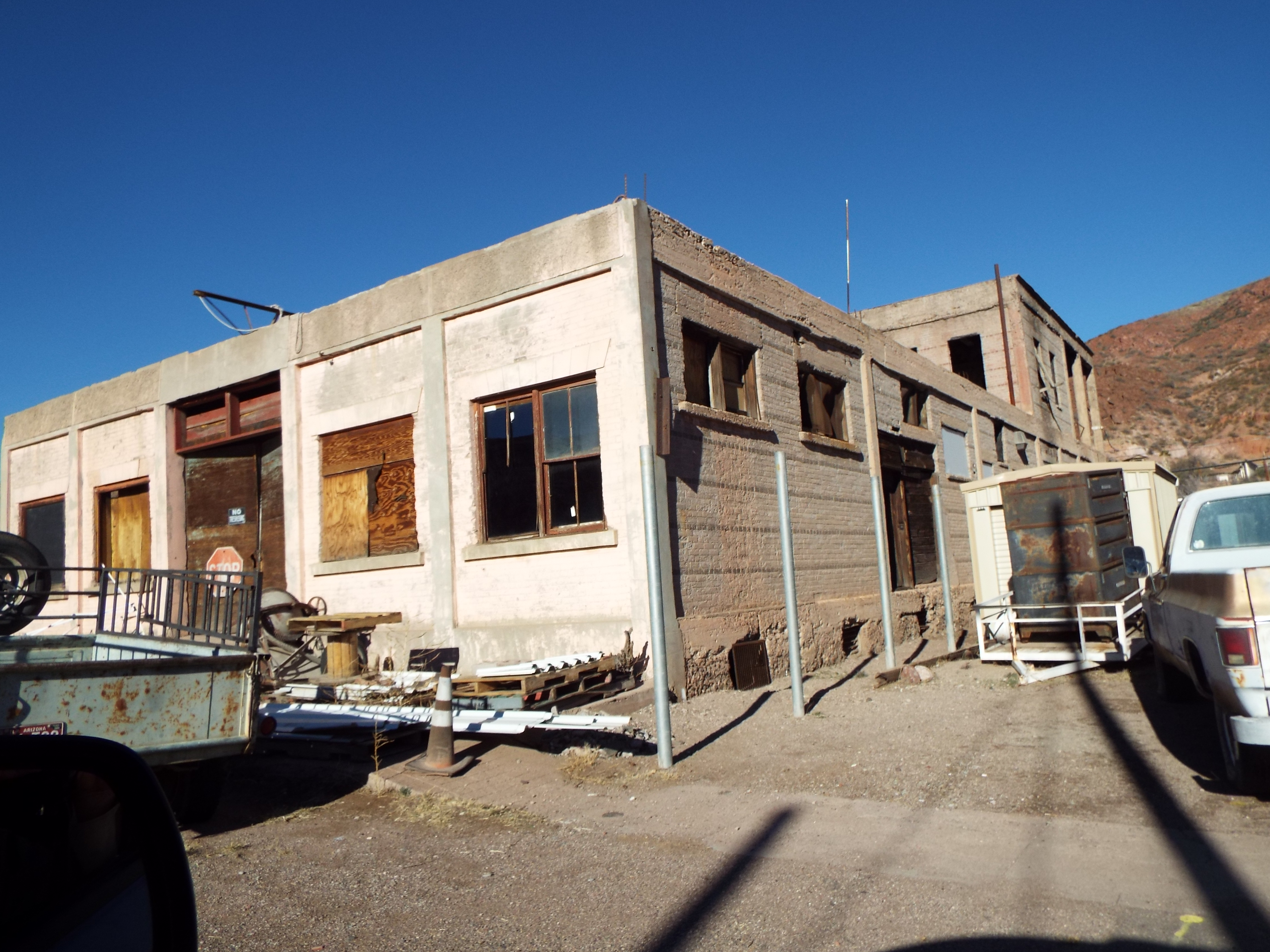
Different view of the Storage and Livery

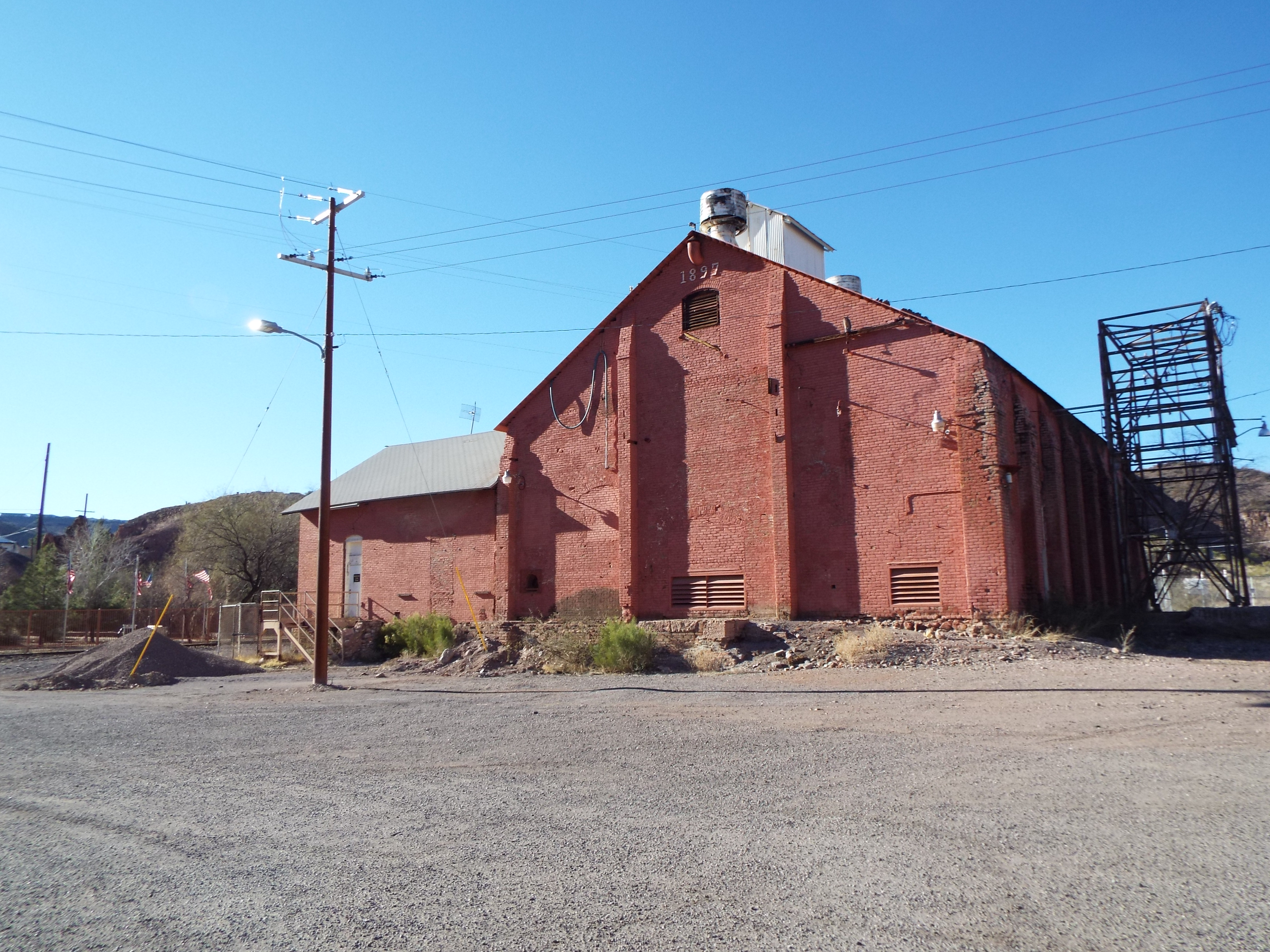
Old Arizona Copper Co. Smelter Power House – 1897

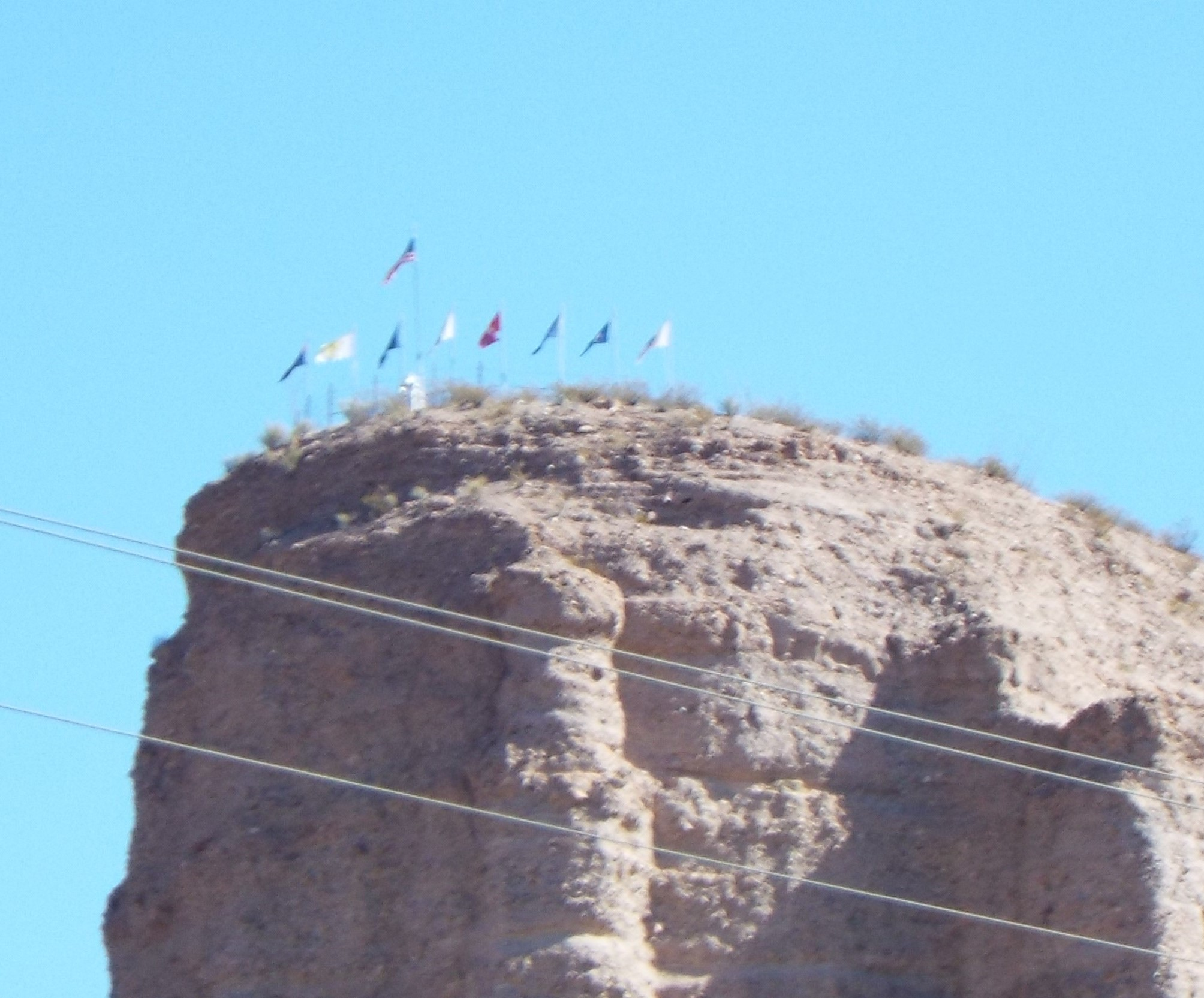
Mares Bluff Veterans Memorial Flags

=== Baby-gauge “Number 8” locomotive ===
The Baby-gauge “Number 8” locomotive, nicknamed “Copperhead”, was the first baby-gauge locomotive to arrive in Arizona in 1897, the same year it was built. It was called a “baby gauge” railroad because it was 20 in (508 mm) gauge, instead of 4 ft 8 1/2 in (1,435 mm) standard gauge. The locomotive once pulled ore trains from the Metcalf mines for the Arizona Copper Company. It was retired in 1922. Tommy Sidebotham, a Clifton resident and former train engineer, purchased and restored the locomotive, which is currently on display next to the Clifton Cliff Jail.

Historic Baby-gauge “Number 8” locomotive "Copperhead"
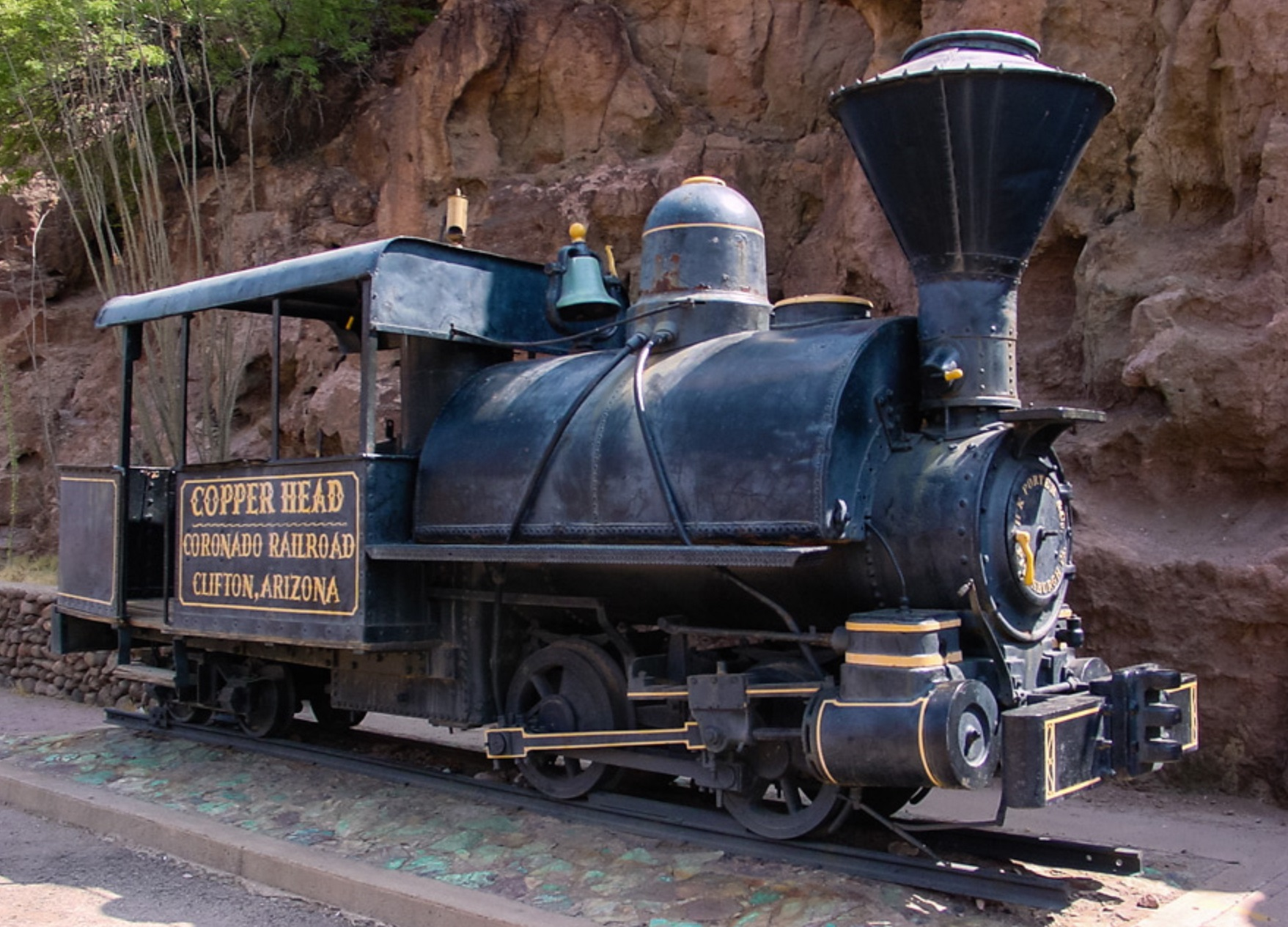
Copperhead “Number 8” locomotive – 1897

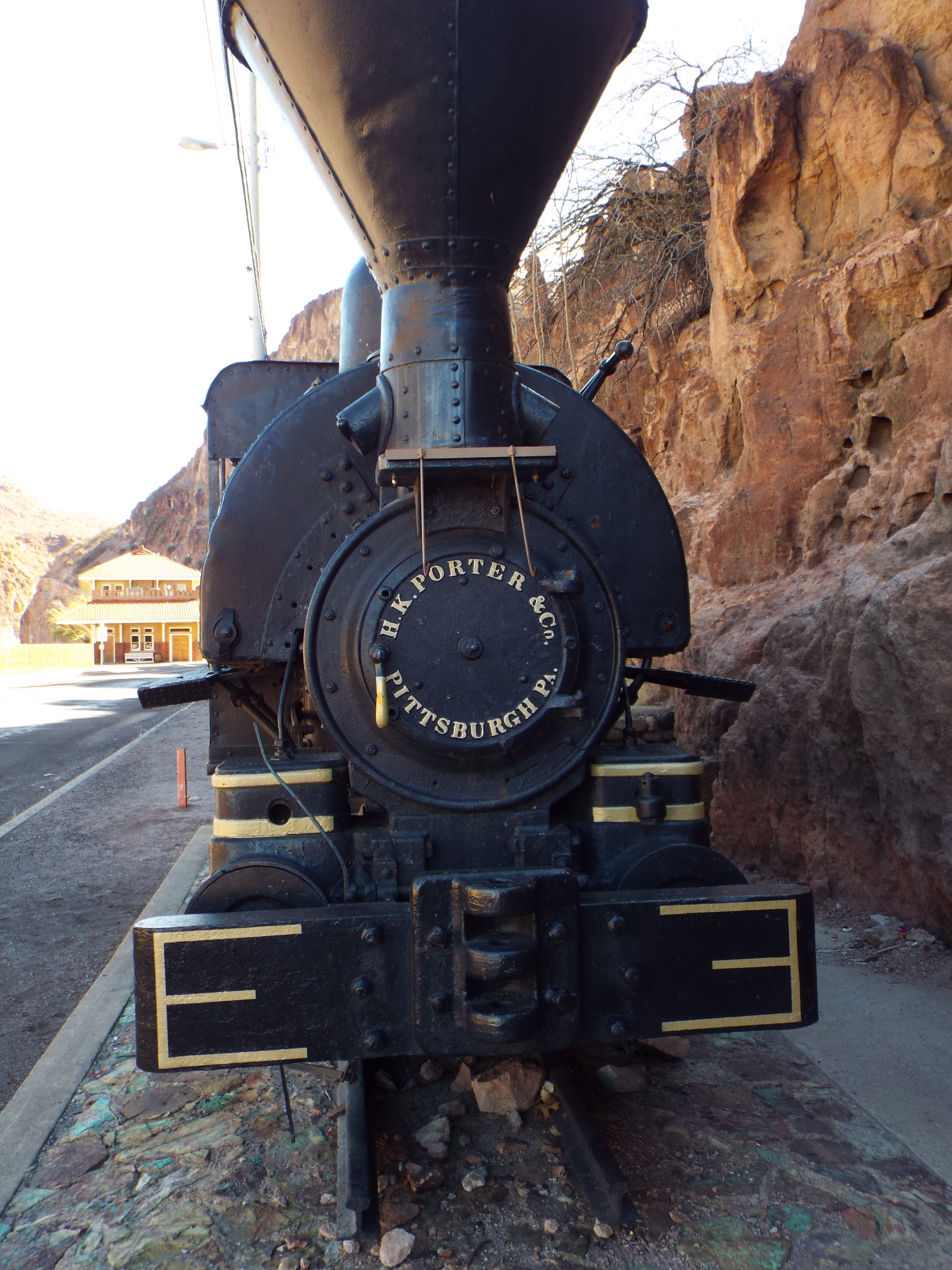
Front of Copperhead

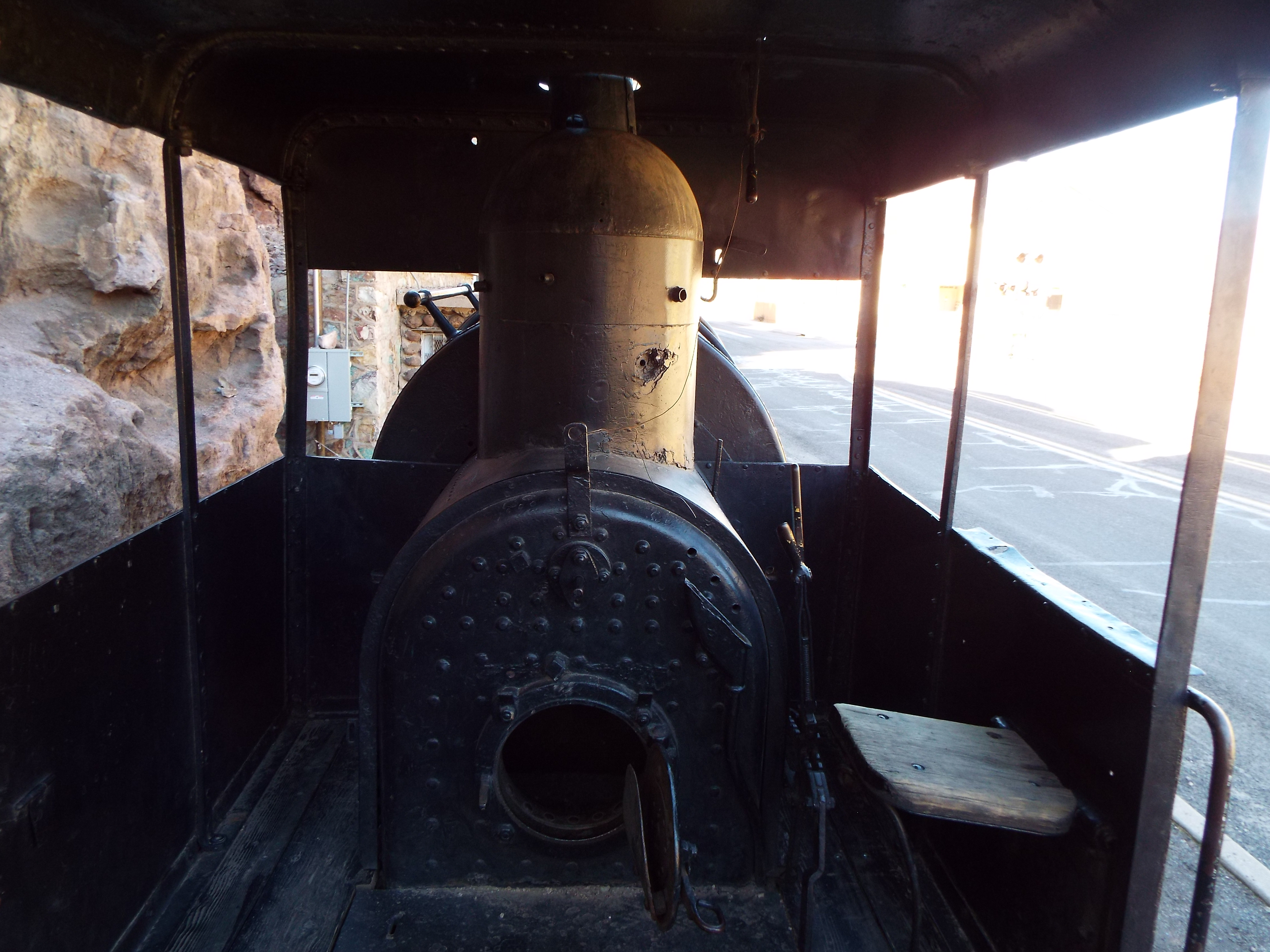
Inside Copperhead

== See also ==
- Clifton, Arizona
- National Register of Historic Places listings in Greenlee County, Arizona
